= Australian residential architectural styles =

Architectural styles

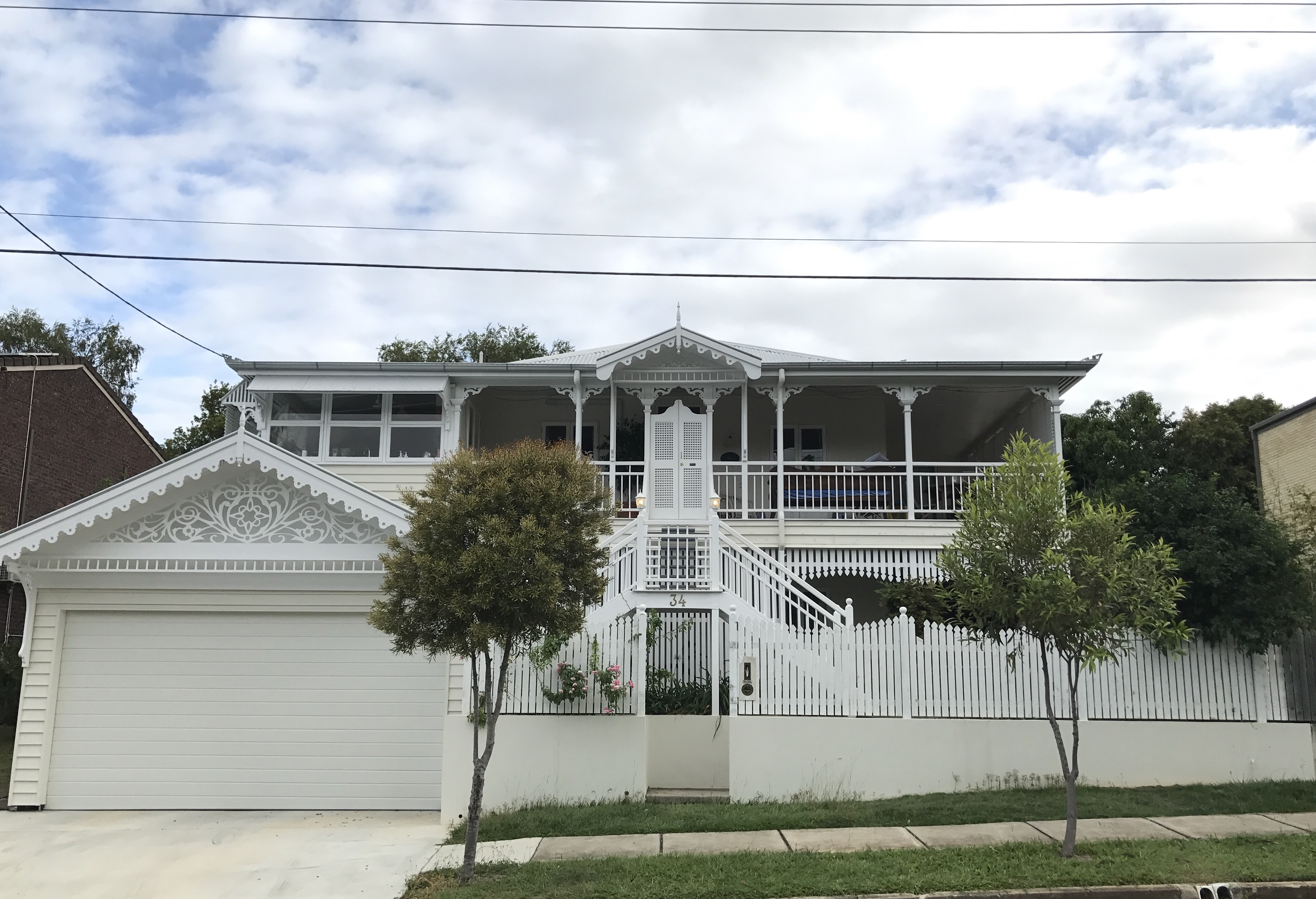
Home in the Queenslander style

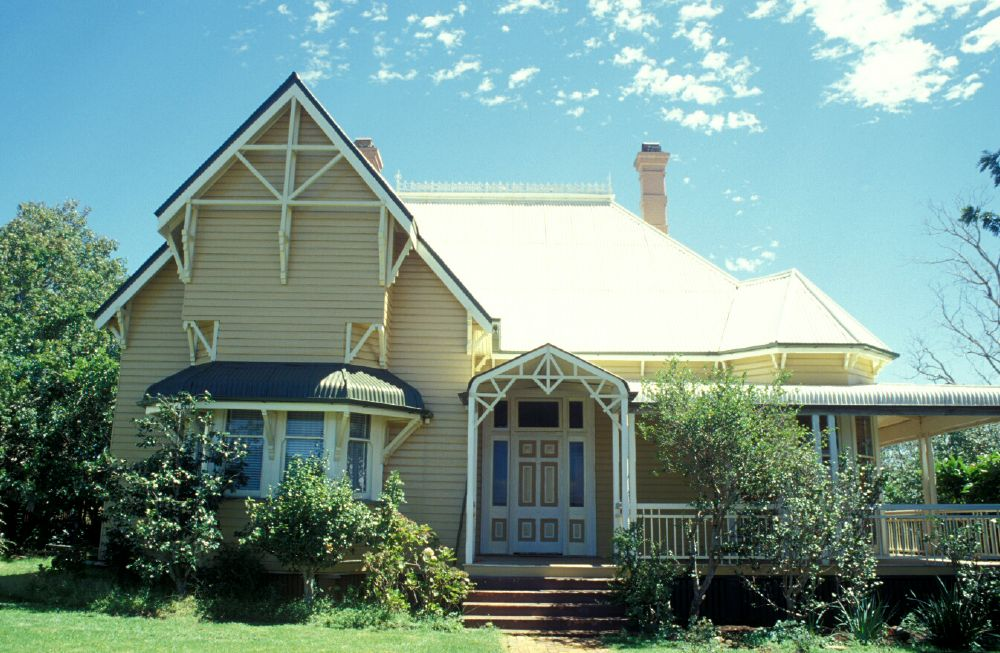
Heritage listed home "Oak Lodge" in Toowoomba, Queensland.

Australian residential architectural styles have evolved significantly over time, from the early days of structures made from relatively cheap and imported corrugated iron (which can still be seen in the roofing of historic homes) to more sophisticated styles borrowed from other countries, such as the California bungalow from the United States, the Georgian style from Europe and Northern America, and the Victorian style from the United Kingdom. A common feature of the Australian home is the use of fencing in front gardens, also common in both the United Kingdom and the United States.

Climate has also influenced housing styles, with balconies and verandah spaces being more prevalent in subtropical Queensland due to the mild, generally warm winters experienced in the state. For many years, Australian homes were built with little understanding of the Australian climate and were widely dependent on European styles that were unsympathetic to Australian landscapes. In recent times, modern Australian residential architecture has reflected the climatic conditions of the country, with adaptations such as double and triple glazing on windows, coordination considerations, use of east and west shade, sufficient insulation, strongly considered to provide comfort to the dweller.

Another aspect of Australian suburbia is that the suburbs tend to have a combination of both upper middle class and middle class housing in the same neighbourhood. In Melbourne, for instance, one early observer noted that "a poor house stands side by side with a good house." This is somewhat less common today, with home renovations, gentrification and the teardown ("knock down, rebuild") method becoming more and more common in affluent suburbs, giving a broader distinction between wealthy and lower class areas. However, the teardown technique has led to home buyers purchasing land or older homes in poorer metropolitan areas and building extravagant homes on the land, which look out of place and excessive, failing to match with the remaining houses in the street.

== Variation of styles ==
Because architectural styles have varied in Australia over the years (from villas to bungalows and brick renders), there is a slight inconsistency in the architectural flow of the suburban streets, with writer Troy Patrick noting that Australian housing styles tend to comingle and coexist awkwardly. This is less common in the United States of America and England, because most of the homes had been long established well into the 19th century and reflect a similar style in both regions. Residential architects in Australia have suggested adapting similar styles of new homes with the surrounding established homes to create a sense of uniformity.

In Australia, the artificial background of life is all highs and lows. A modernistic folly in multi-coloured brickwork may sit next door to a Georgian mansionette on one side and a sensible work of architectural exploration on the other.

— Robin Boyd, The Australian Ugliness

== History and styles ==
=== Pre-colonial period ~40,000 BCE – 1788 CE ===
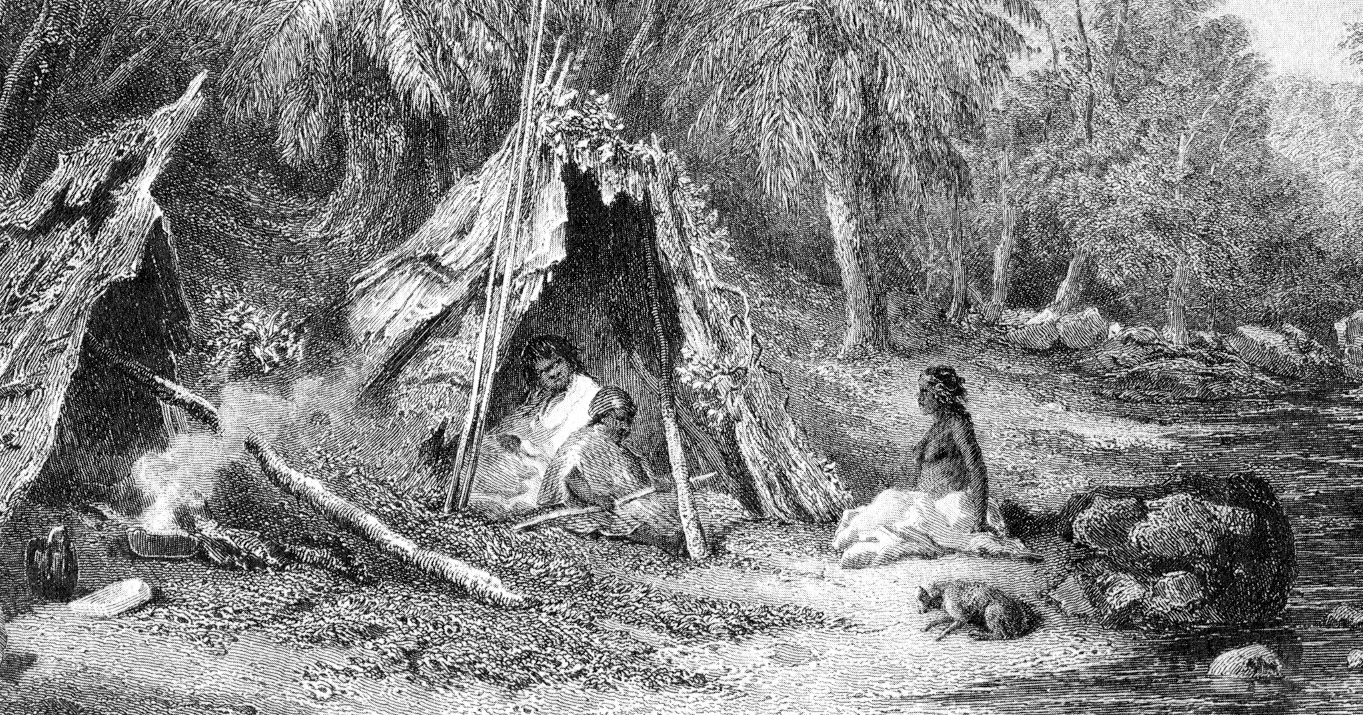
A 19th-century engraving of an indigenous Australian encampment, representing the indigenous mode of life in the cooler parts of Australia before the arrival of Europeans

Indigenous Australians are traditionally semi-nomadic, rotating between different areas in conjunction with the seasons to harvest and maintain food-producing areas. They managed the land through controlled burning practices involving a biennial burning-off which stunted forest growth and encouraged crop germination.

The housing of the Eora people first encountered by Europeans in the Sydney region were shelters constructed of a semicircle of stick, covered with large sheets of bark which could be conveniently stripped off Melaleuca trees which grew profusely along waterways. Other types of simple structures were seen including lean-tos and in tropical regions raised sleeping platforms. Grass, leaves and reeds were used as a thatch where suitable bark was not available.

There are instances of Indigenous peoples constructing partially using dry-stone wall techniques in Western Australia. The Aboriginal people also built dry-stone Fish Traps, of which the most extensive, ranging over 500 metres, is on the Barwon River at Brewarrina. Its age is unknown. It has been maintained and rebuilt after floods many times and is said traditionally to have been given to the local clans by the Creator Spirit.

It appears that in conjunction with such catchment schemes, there may have also been nearby sedentary settlements of people who maintained them. There is evidence at Lake Condah in Victoria of houses in conjunction with eel traps dating back about 8,000 years.

In January 2006 bushfires uncovered another nearby site of a village of stone houses that are large enough to have provided sleeping space for several families.

=== Old Colonial period 1788 – c. 1840 ===
Colonial architecture is the term used for the buildings constructed in Australia between European settlement in January 1788 and about 1840.

The first buildings of the British penal settlement in Sydney were a prefabricated house for the Governor and a similarly prefabricated Government Store to house the colony's supplies. Sydney was a tent settlement. Building anything more substantial was made unnecessarily difficult by the poor quality of spades and axes that had been provided and the shortage of nails.

The convicts adapted simple country techniques commonly used for animal shelters and the locally available materials to create huts with wattle-and-daub walls. So useful were the local acacia trees for weaving shelters that they were given the name Wattle. Some pipe clay was obtained from the coves around Port Jackson. Bricks were fired in wood fires and were therefore soft. Lime for cement was obtained by burning oyster shells.

The first imported roofing material was corrugated iron sheeting. Roofs of this type were to become part of the Australian vernacular. For many years imported roofing was in very short supply. Two local roofing materials were available- there were extensive reed beds near the Cook's river for thatching. There was also bark which could be peeled off a number of the indigenous trees in large sheets. Methods of heating and flattening the bark were used by the Aboriginal people and these were quickly assimilated by the convict builders.

The two most significant trees, both of which grew in the Sydney area, were the Melaleuca and the ironbark. The Melaleuca bark, having the texture of paper, could be peeled off the tree in layers up to 2 centimetres (0.79 in) thick, a metre long and perhaps half a metre wide without serious damage to the tree. Although not particularly durable as exterior roofing, the material provided excellent insulation and was used for ceilings and lining the walls.

The resilient bark from the ironbark tree was adapted as a major building material everywhere that such trees grew. It was widely used as a roofing material, was weatherproof, insulating and could last for thirty years. Houses of axe-hewn slabs with Iron-bark roofs continued to be built in rural Australia until WWII.

As better tools became available the Colonial builders became adept at working the extremely hard and durable timber of the native hardwood forests. The majority of houses were built of split logs rather than sawn timber. The technique employed for the construction of a wall was to chisel out a deep groove in a straight log, preferably of the local termite-resistant Cyprus pine which became the foundation. Split logs that had been adzed flat at the ends were then stood in the groove and another groove log was placed on top and slotted into place in a circular corner post. The gaps between the split logs were either packed with clay and animal hair or had narrow strips of metal cut from kerosene tins tacked over them. The interior could be plastered with clay, lined with paperbark or papered with newspaper, wrapping paper or calico. Cards, photographs, news clippings and commemorative items were often stuck directly onto the walls.

The technique of making durable hardwood roofing shingles was also developed. Where these shingles have been applied to brick houses, they have sometimes survived to the 21st century, covered by subsequent corrugated iron roofs.

In the earliest houses windows were usually small, and multi-paned with cylinder glass. When the cost of glass put it beyond reach of the home-owner, blinds of oiled calico were tacked across window openings in the winter months.

Types of buildings

The simplest houses were of a single room, which, if the bread-winner prospered, became the kitchen to a more substantial residence, or conversely, became the living room with a lean-to kitchen added. Houses that grew piecemeal were generally asymmetrical, with the door leading into the original room.

Houses that were planned were generally symmetrical, and very simple, usually containing 2 to 4 rooms around a central hallway. The kitchen was frequently detached and entered from a rear verandah or covered breezeway where pantry or scullery might also be located. Fireplaces projected outwards from the walls of the house. Except in the case of some small inner-city Georgian row houses built of brick, houses generally had a verandah added to them, often on three sides.

One class of people who maintained the tradition of wattle and daub, with a bark roof was the squatters who did not have title to their land, and potentially had to move on every two years.

Very few 19th-century houses of wattle and daub or split timber have survived. A small number of split-timber cottages which later became kitchens may be seen adjacent to more substantial homes, generally painted to match the house and barely recognizable.

Most buildings erected in the first 50 years of Australian settlement were simple and plain. Convict huts, marine barracks, government stores and houses for officials were simple rectangular prisms covered with hipped or gabled roofs often with verandahs supported on wooden columns in the Classical manner. They were influenced in particular by the regulation British military buildings in India and other tropical locations.

At the time of the first settlement, Georgian architecture was the architectural vernacular in Britain. Craftsmen, including carpenters and plasterers were trained in the classic proportions associated with the Palladian style fashionable across Europe. Palladian ideals reveal themselves in some of the few larger homes of the Regency period such as Elizabeth Bay House. Neoclassism incorporating not only Greek but also sometimes Ancient Egyptian motifs, beginning in Europe about 1760, also influenced Australian architectural style. "Fernhill" at Mulgoa with its wide colonnaded verandah shows the influence of Neoclassicism. As the Australian economy developed and settlements became more established, more sophisticated buildings emerged.

==== Old Colonial Georgian ====
The vernacular style of the Old Colonial period. Buildings of this period were often rudimentary compared with British architecture at the time, but Georgian ideas of orderliness still influenced their shape and scale. Buildings built in this style often featured symmetrical facades, rectangular and prismatic shapes, and were well-proportioned. Similar to other British colonies in hot climates, the verandah became a common way to protect a house from the sun, and on single storey houses the Georgian verandah is usually a lower pitched extension of the main roof.

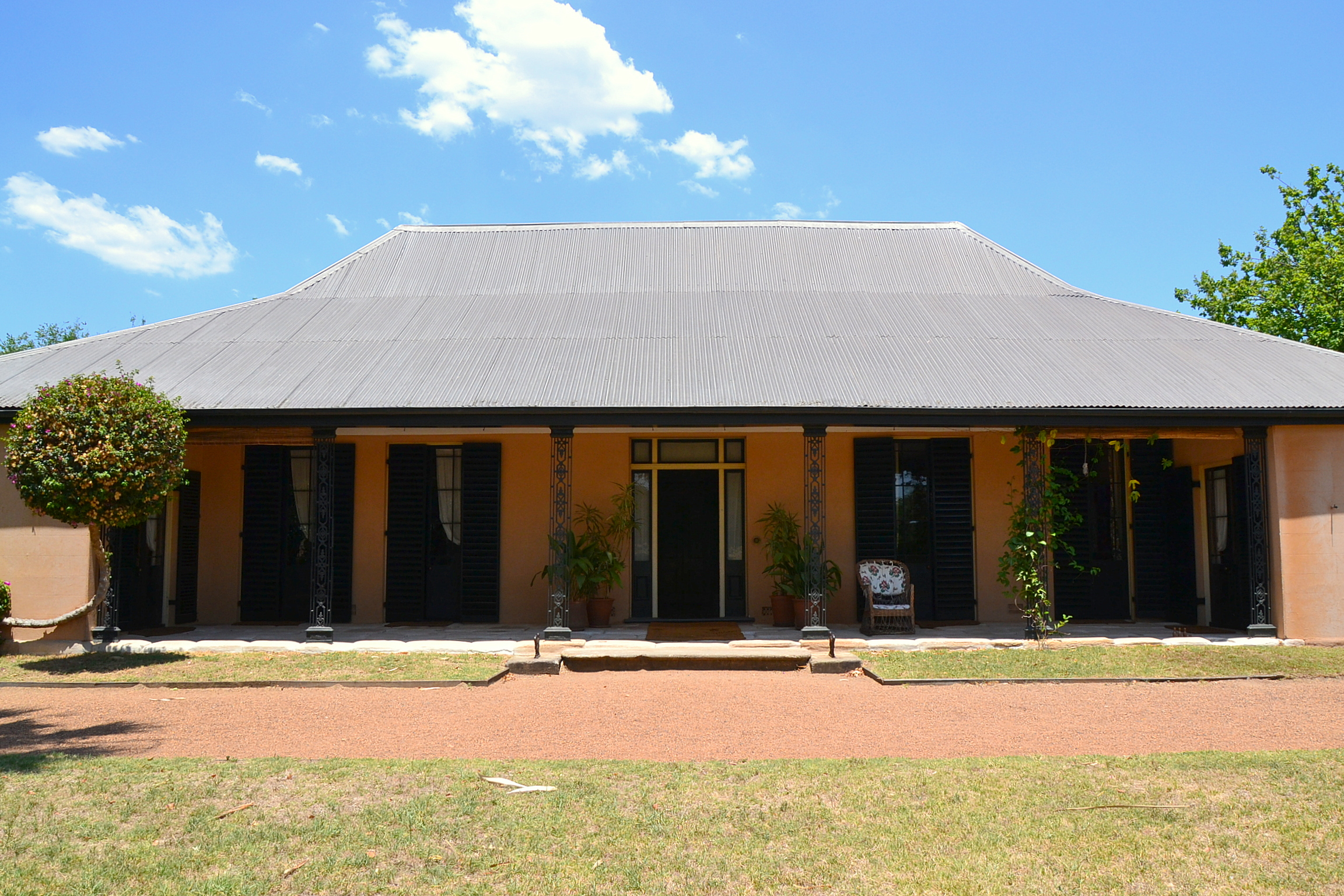
Elizabeth Farm Cottage, Rosehill; completed 1793; one of the oldest surviving residences in Australia

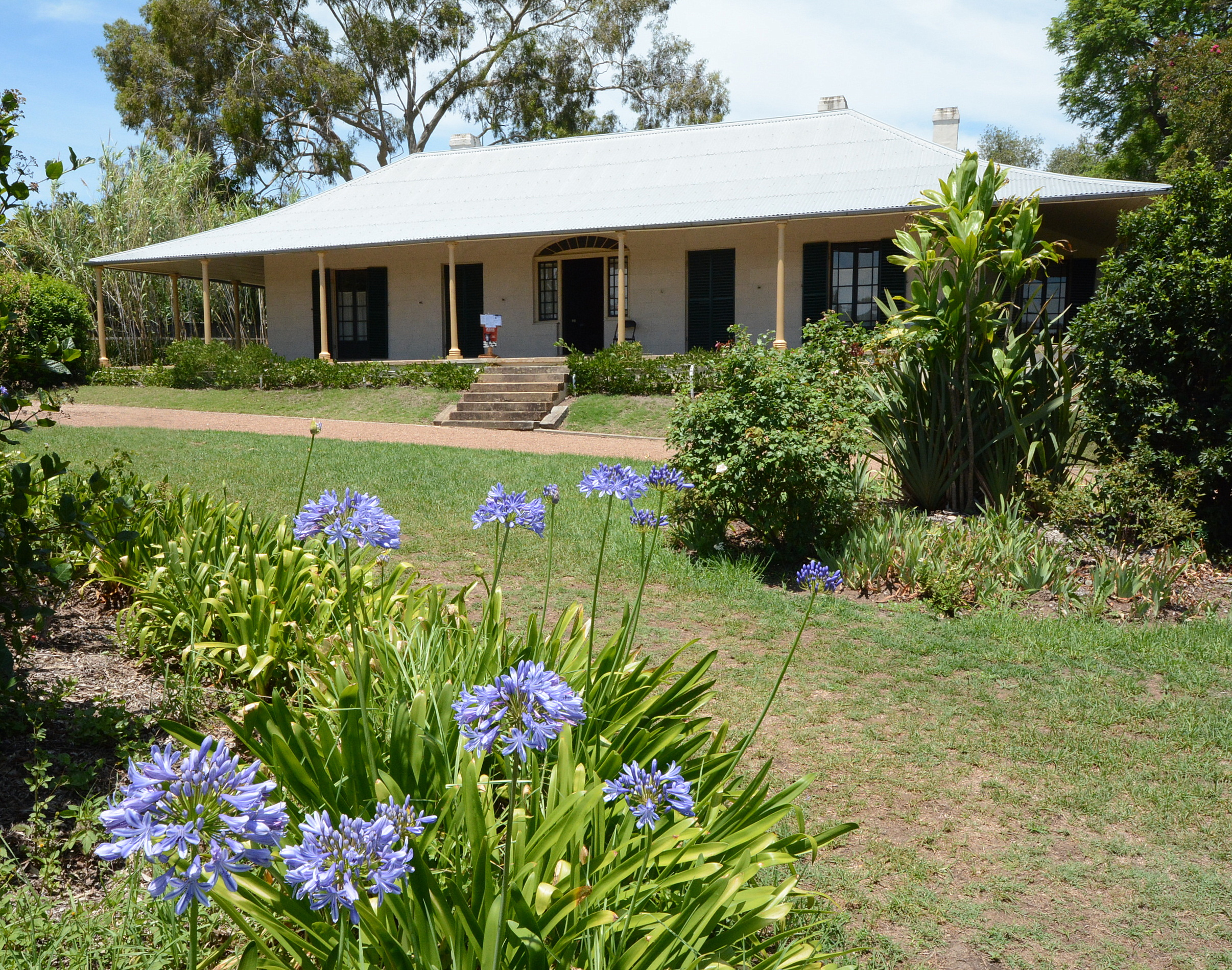
Experiment Farm Cottage, Harris Park; completed 1795

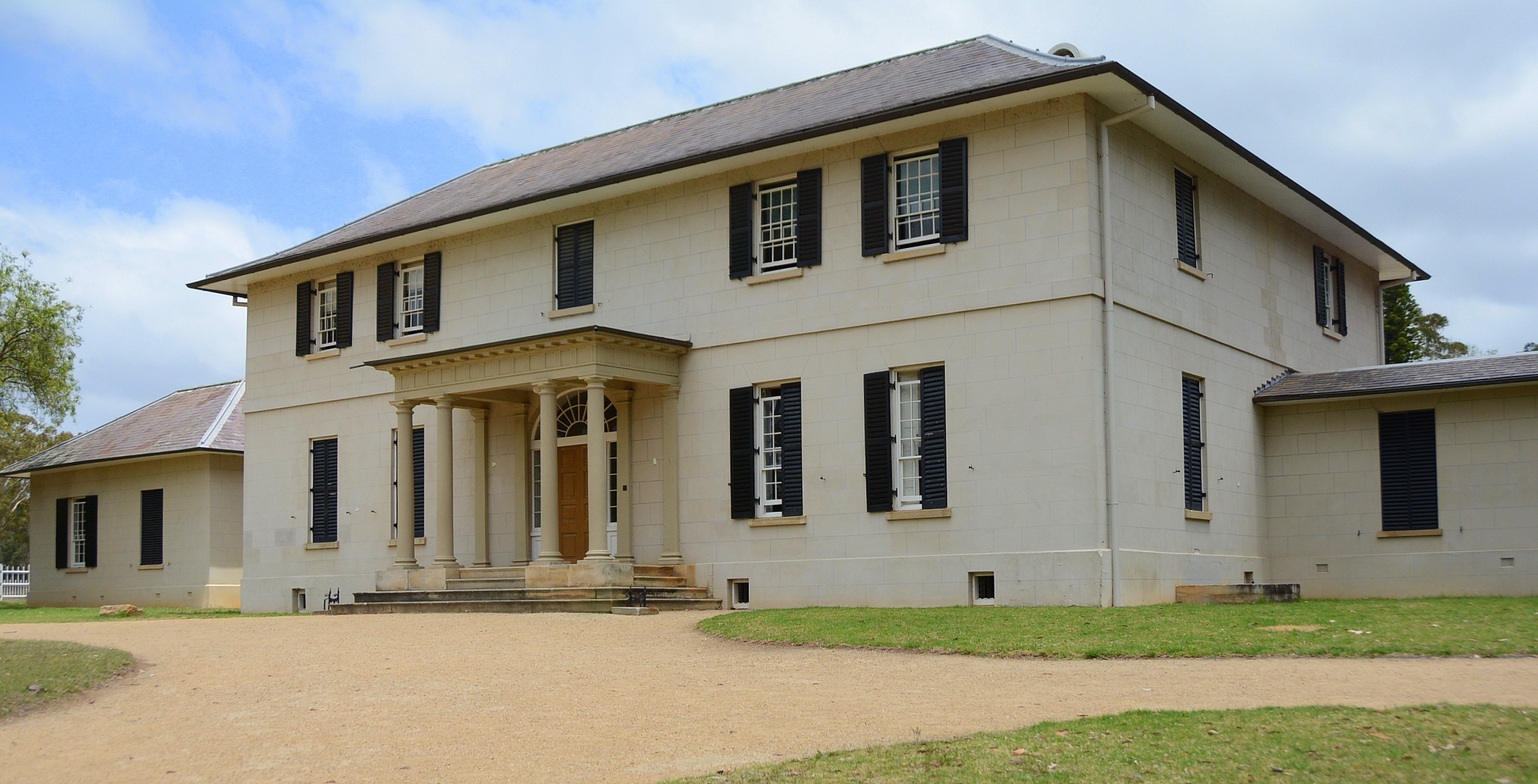
Old Government House, Parramatta; completed between 1799 and 1820

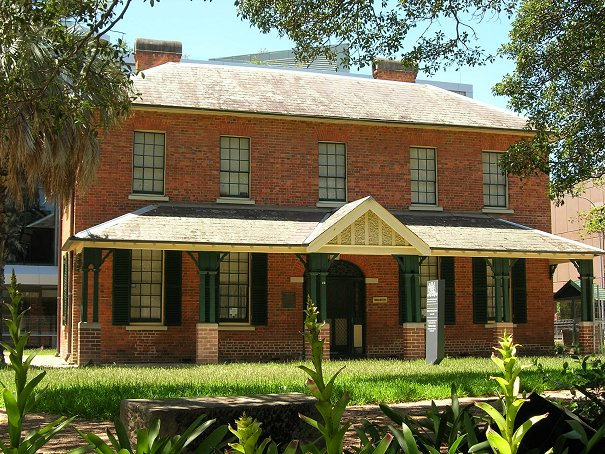
Brislington, Parramatta; completed 1821

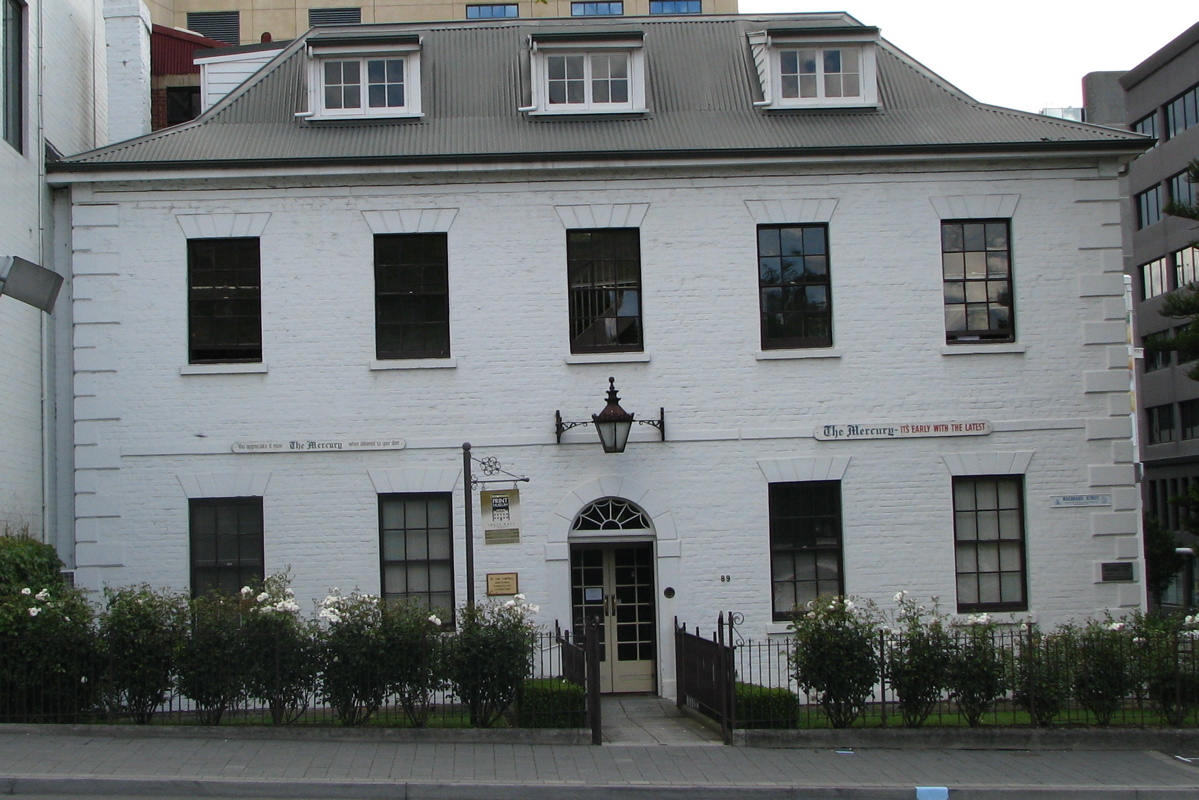
Ingle Hall, Hobart; completed 1814

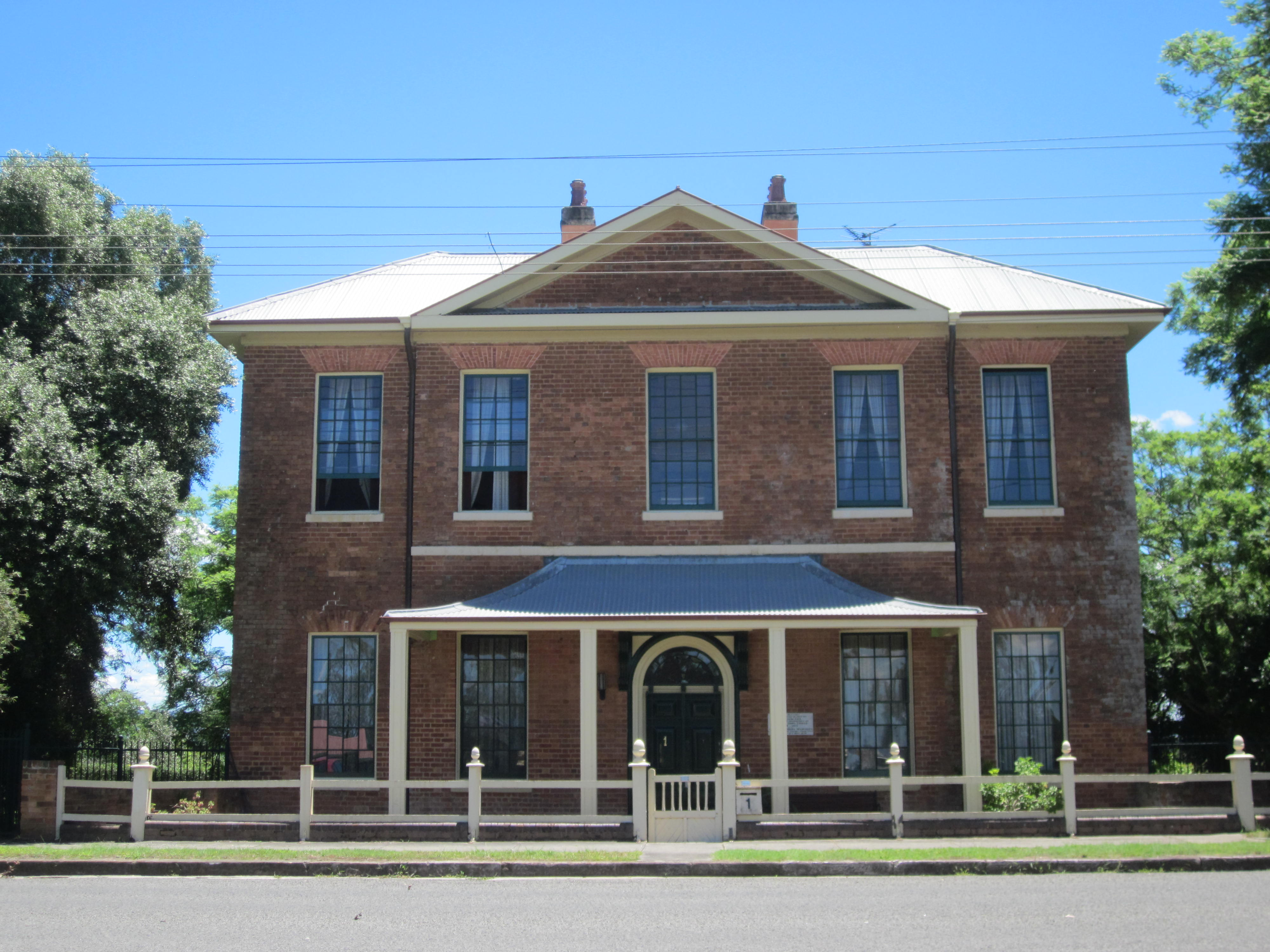
St Matthew's Anglican Church, Windsor; completed c.1822

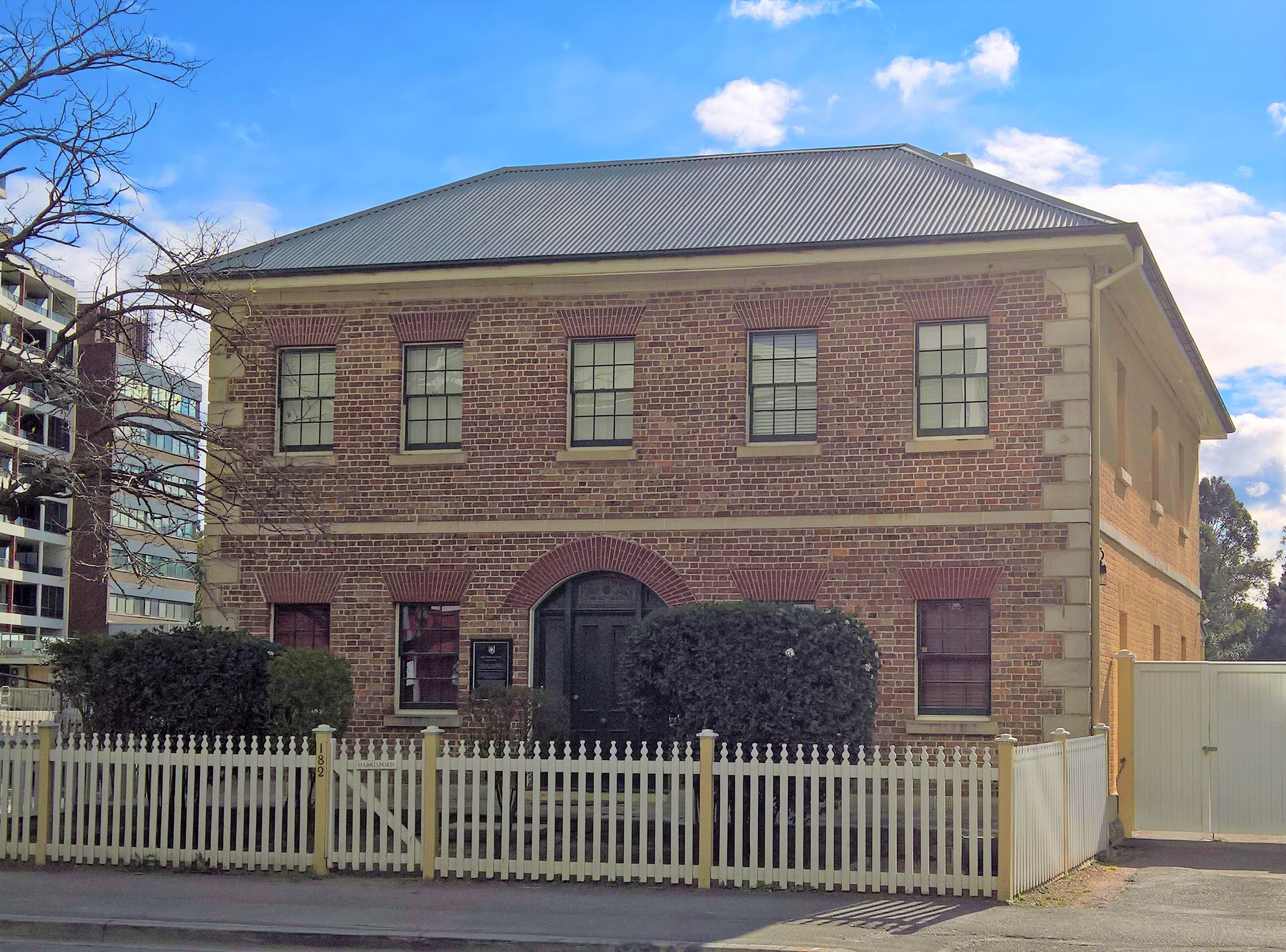
Harrisford, Parramatta; completed 1820s

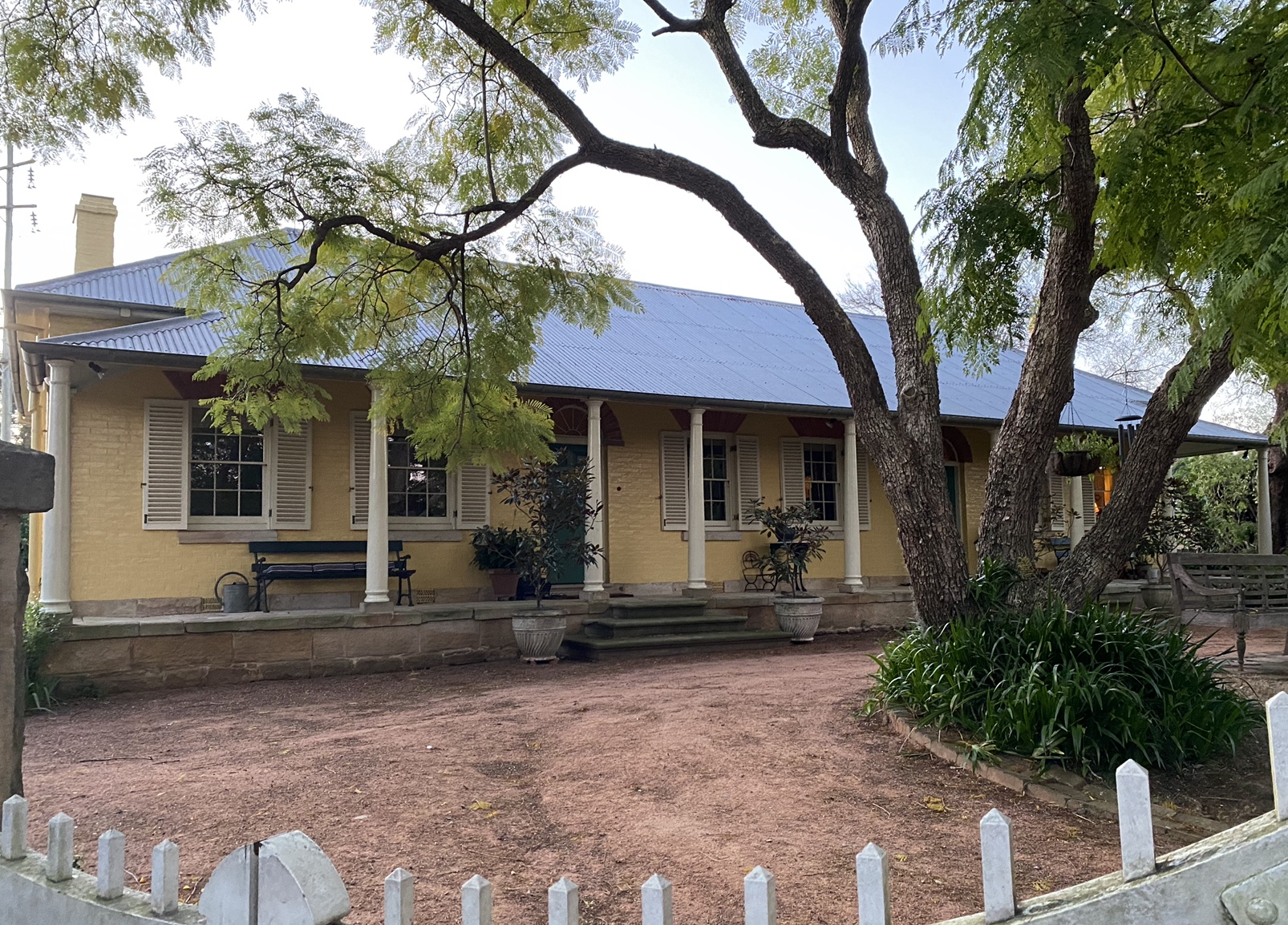
Joyce Farmhouse, Baulkham Hills; built 1794, rebuilt after fire in 1804

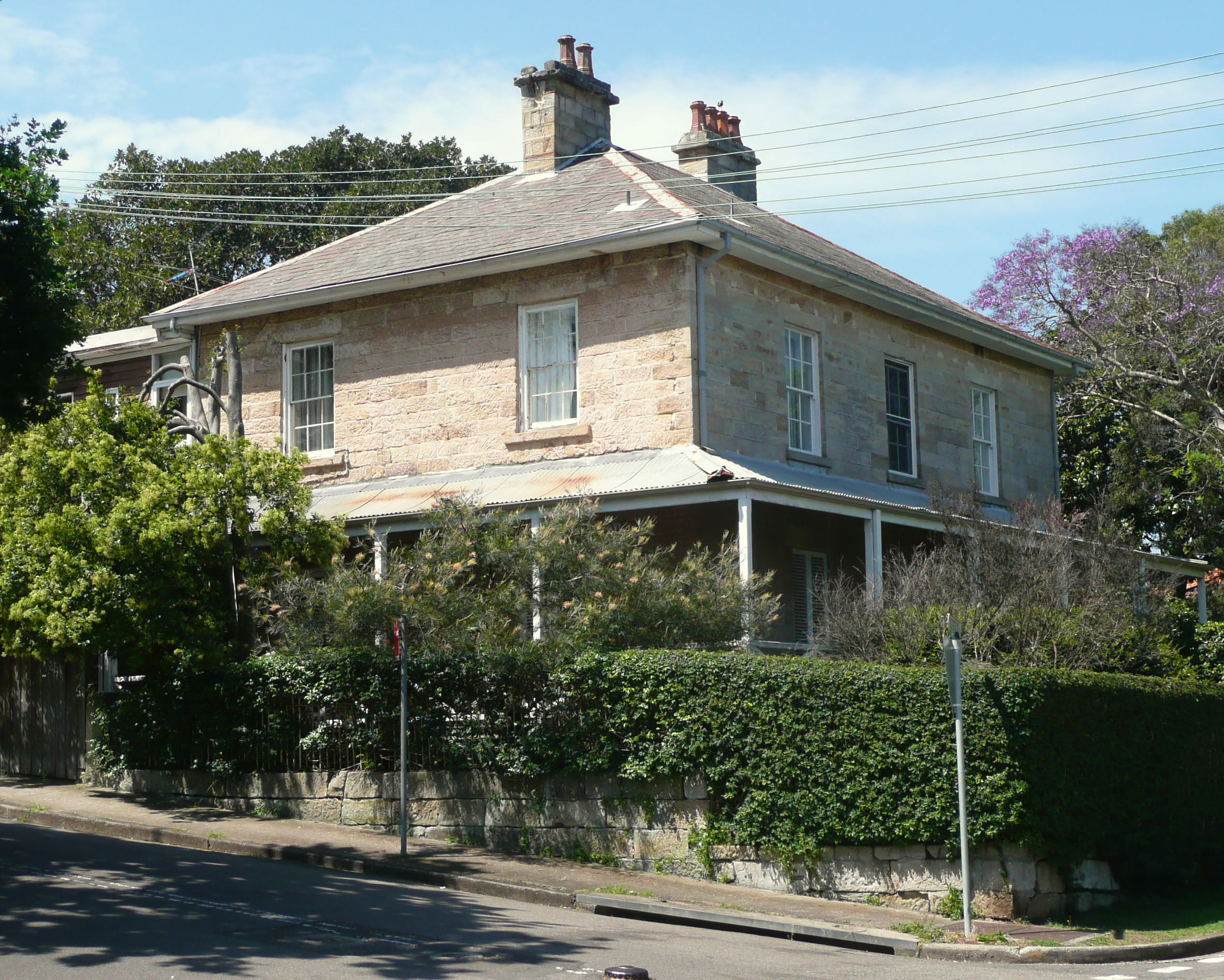
Greenwich House, Greenwich; completed 1836

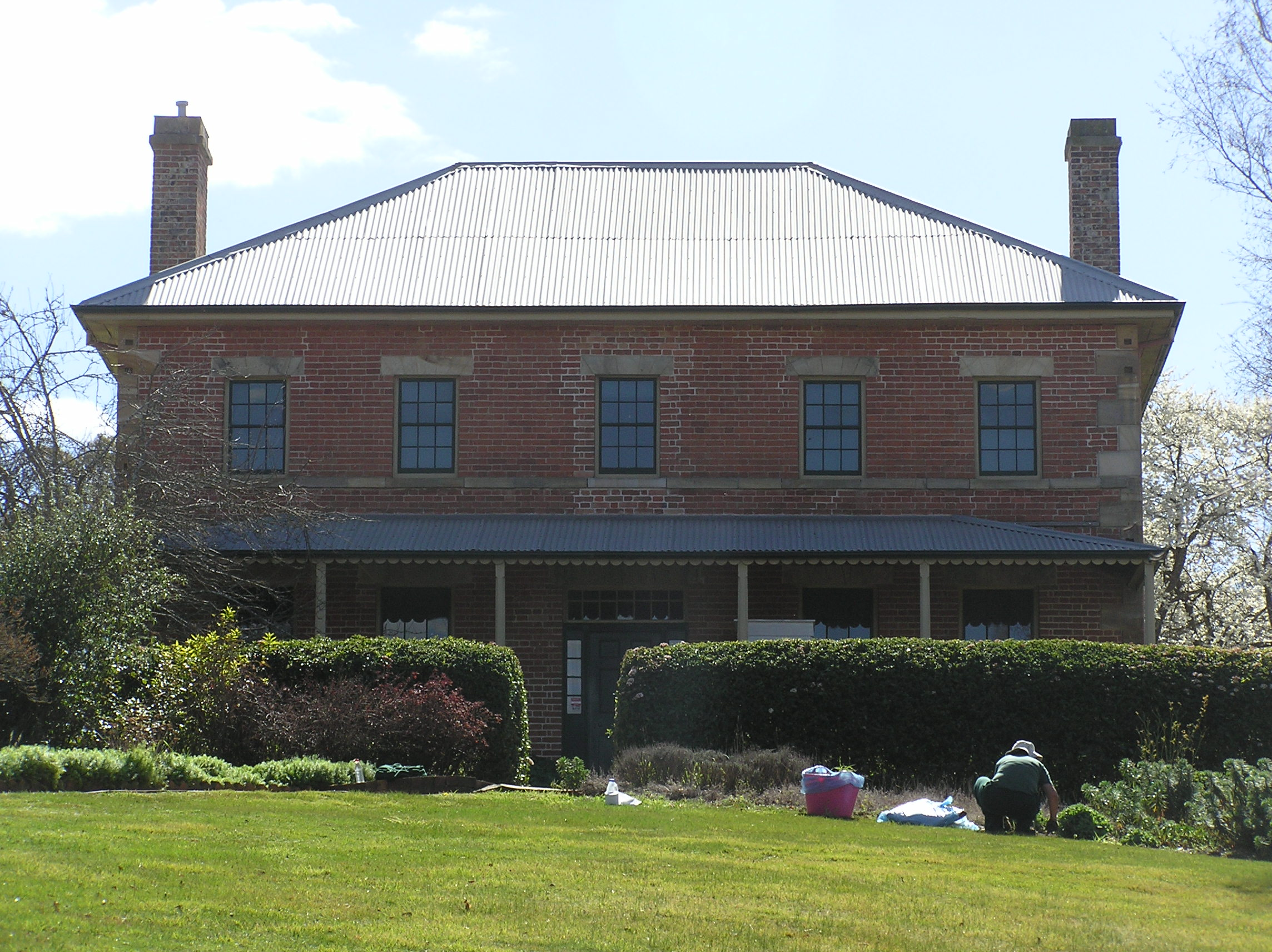
Harper's Mansion, Berrima; built 1834-44

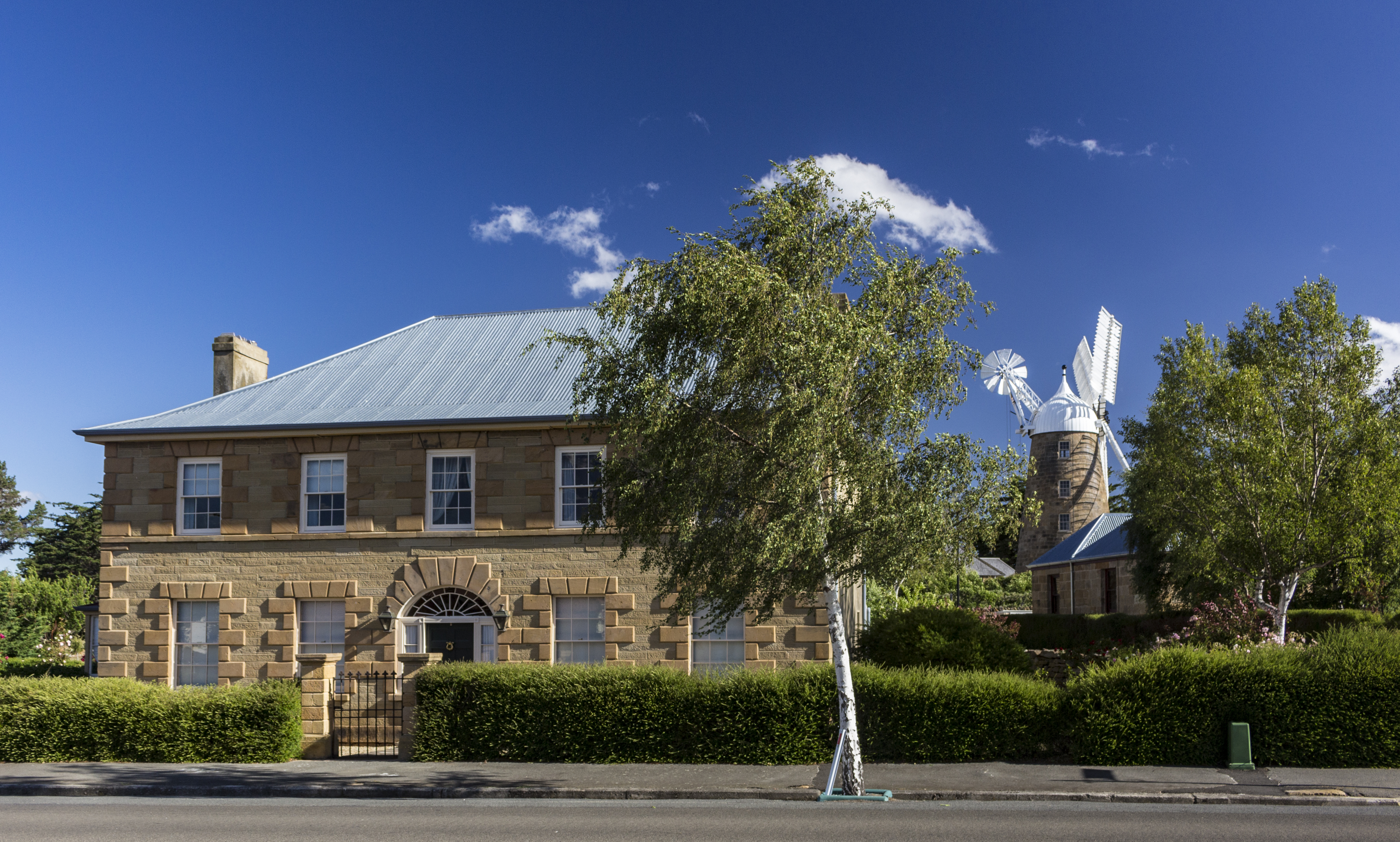
Oatlands Coach House, Oatlands

==== Old Colonial Regency ====
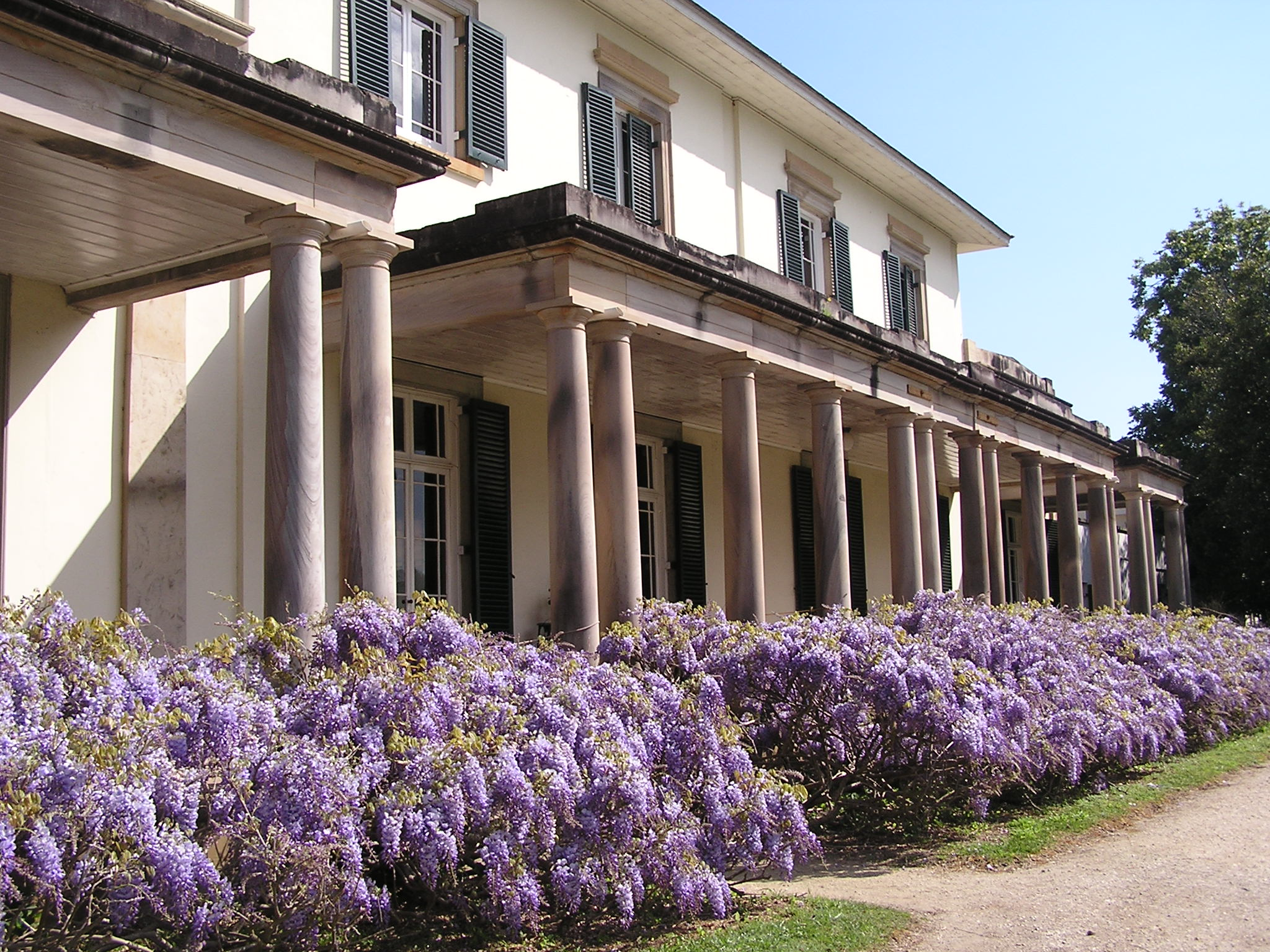
Camden Park House, Menangle; completed 1831; designed by John Verge.

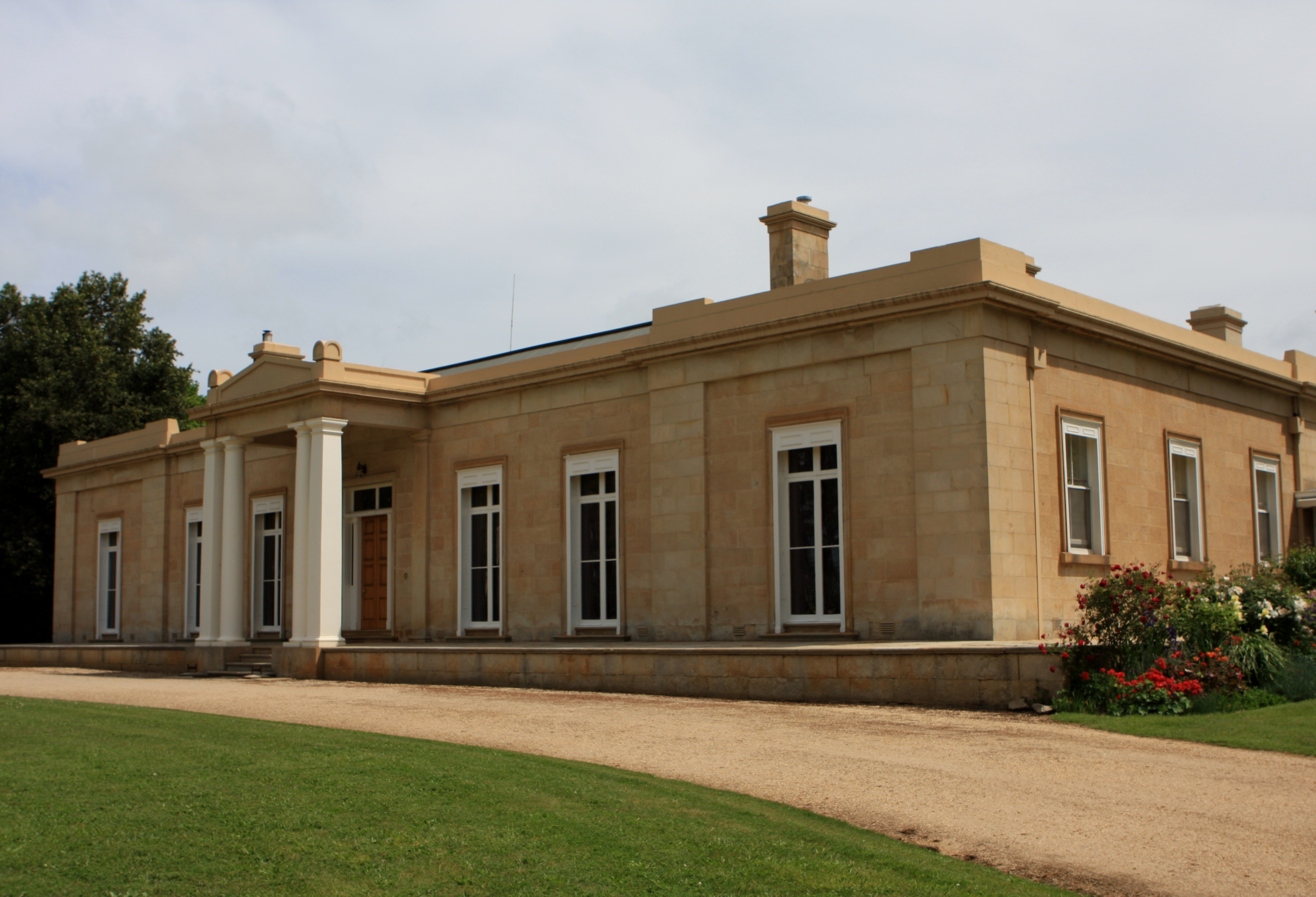
Panshanger, near Longford. Completed 1831.

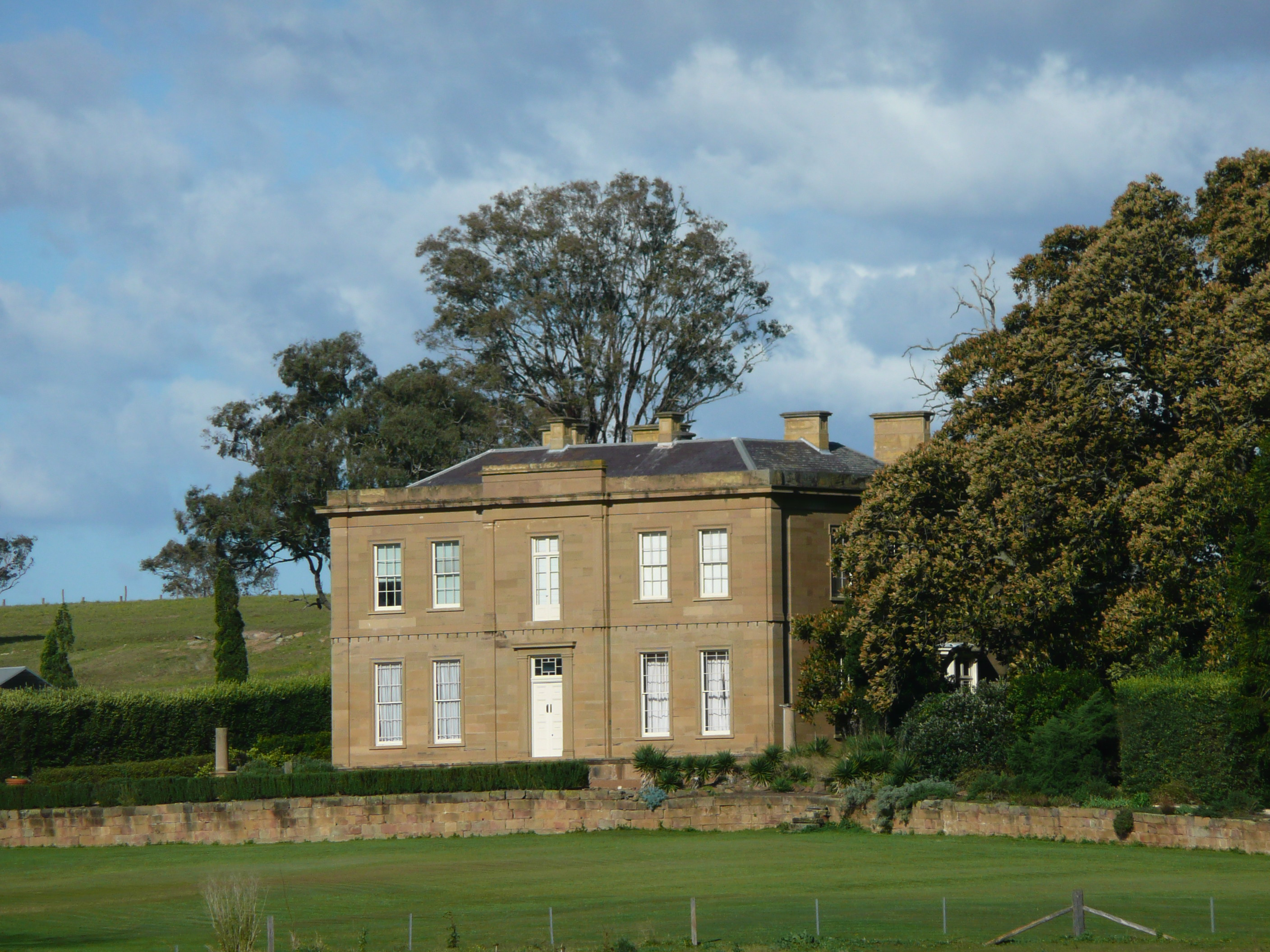
Aberglasslyn House, Maitland. Completed between 1840 and 1842

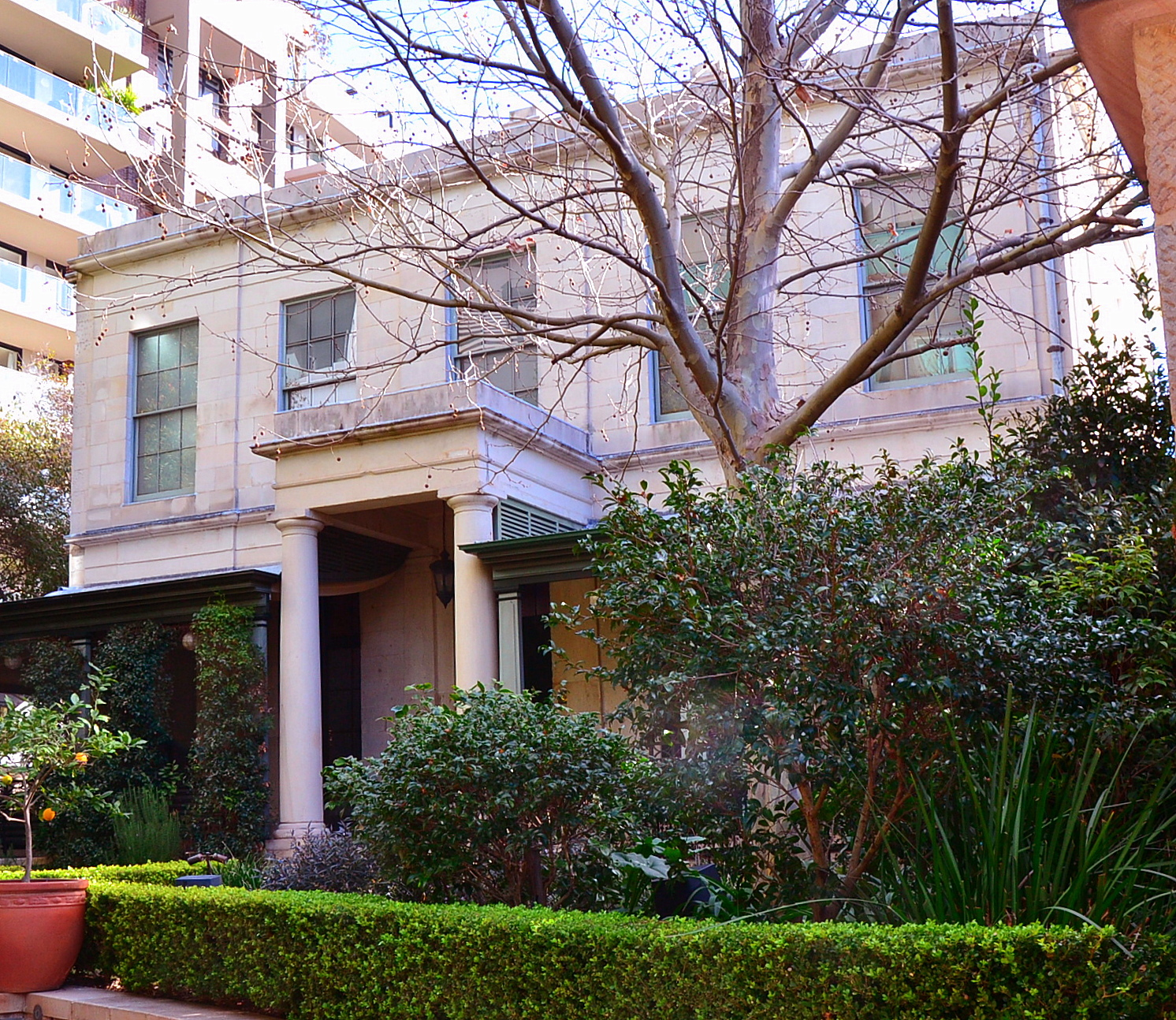
Rockwall House, designed by John Verge, in Potts Point. Completed 1837.

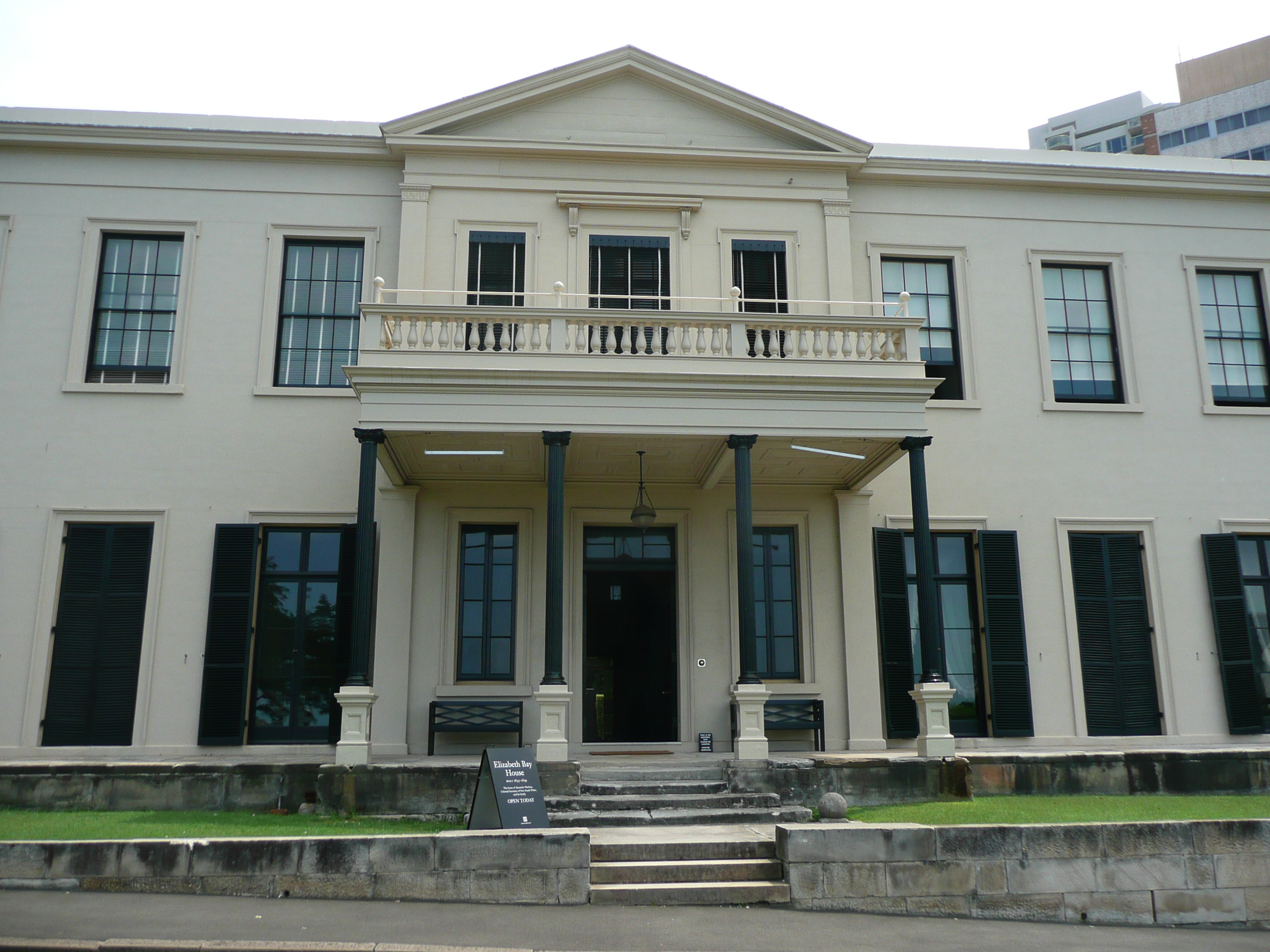
Elizabeth Bay House, Elizabeth Bay, also designed by John Verge. Completed 1838.

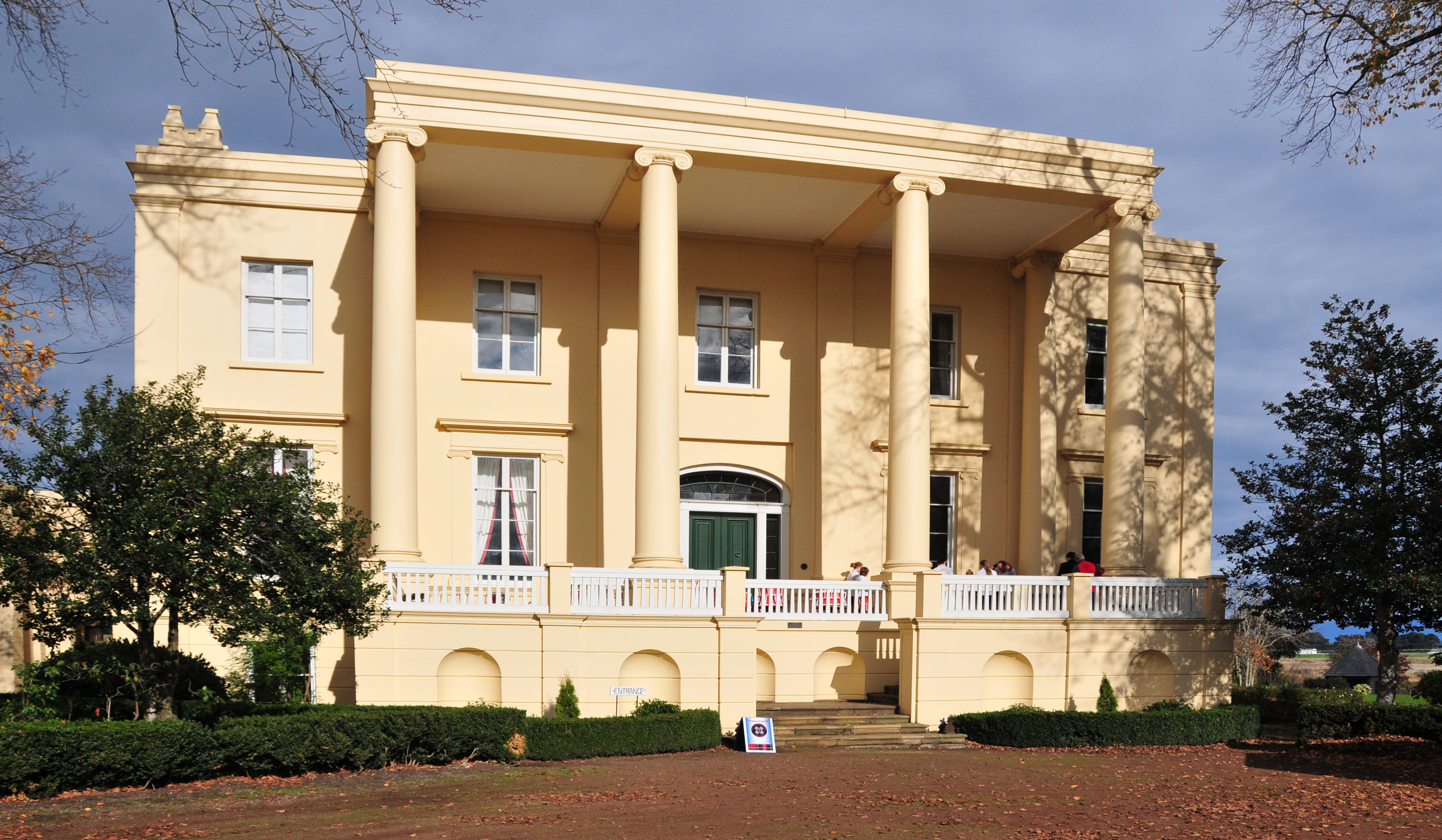
Clarendon House, Evandale; completed in 1838

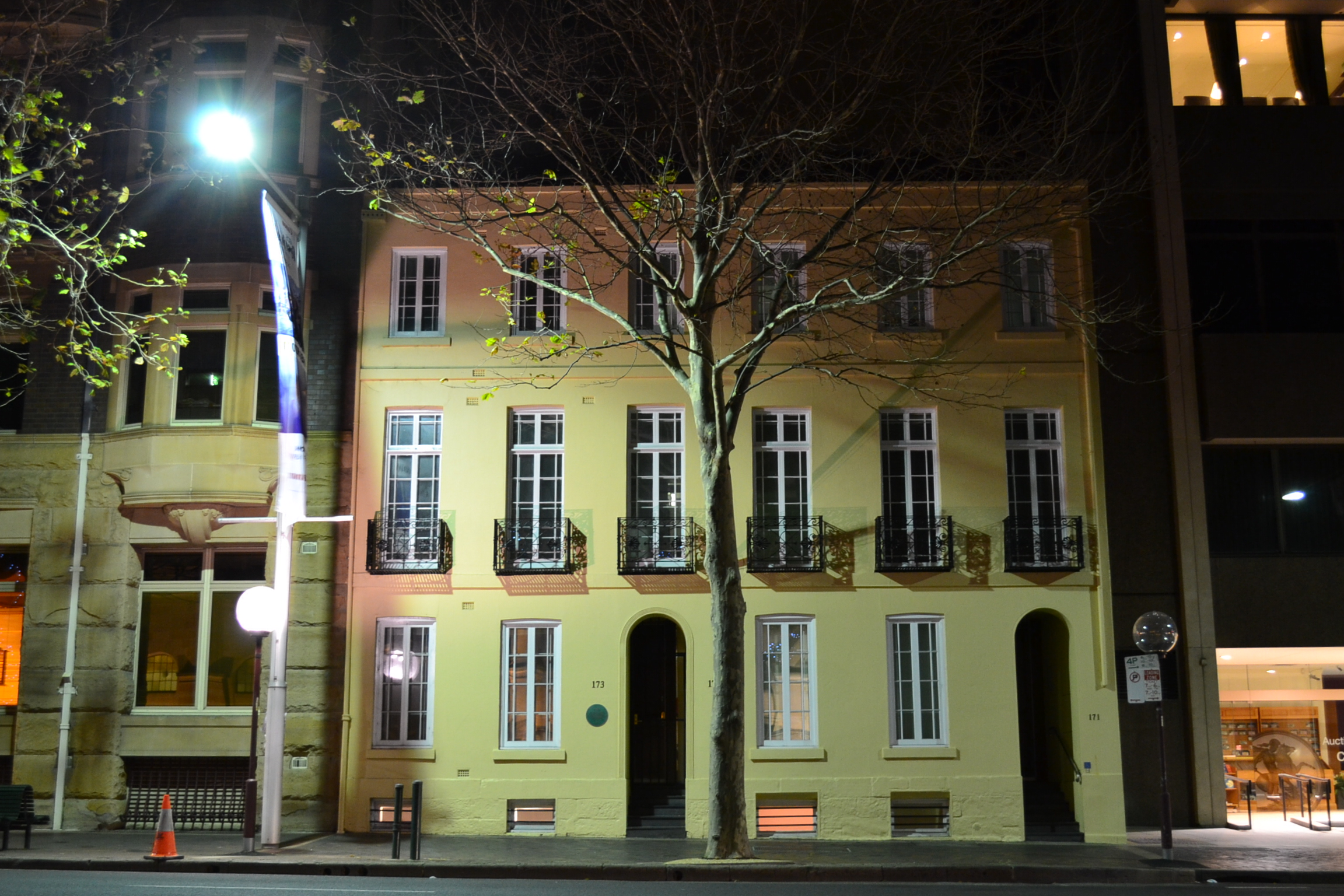
Horbury Terrace, Sydney. Completed 1842.

==== Old Colonial Grecian ====
In Georgian era Britain, Neoclassical architecture mainly drew its inspiration from Roman architecture until the rediscovery of Ancient Greek architecture beginning with James "Athenian" Stuart's 1758 trip to Greece. By the 1830s the Greek Revival architecture was reaching the heights of its popularity, and had major influences on the development of the Regency style. Old Colonial Grecian buildings used Greek features such as the pedimented temple, porticoes, and Greek order columns such as the Doric and the Ionian.

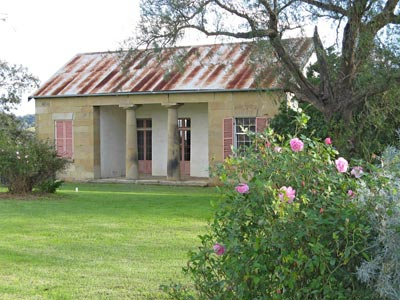
Dalwood House, Branxton; completed c. 1833

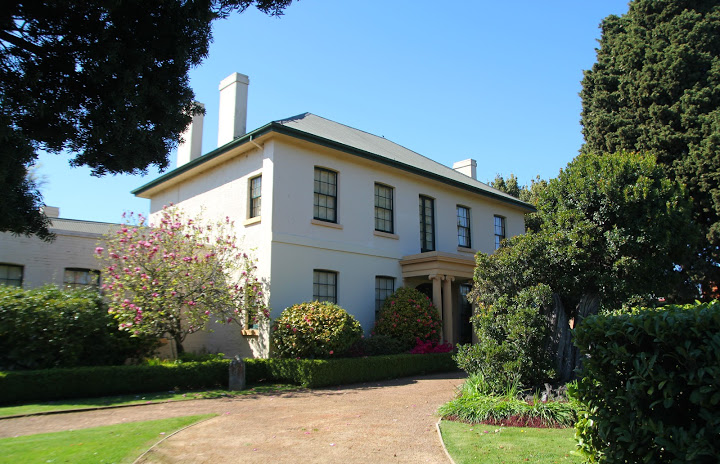
Franklin House, Launceston; completed 1839

==== Old Colonial Gothic Picturesque ====
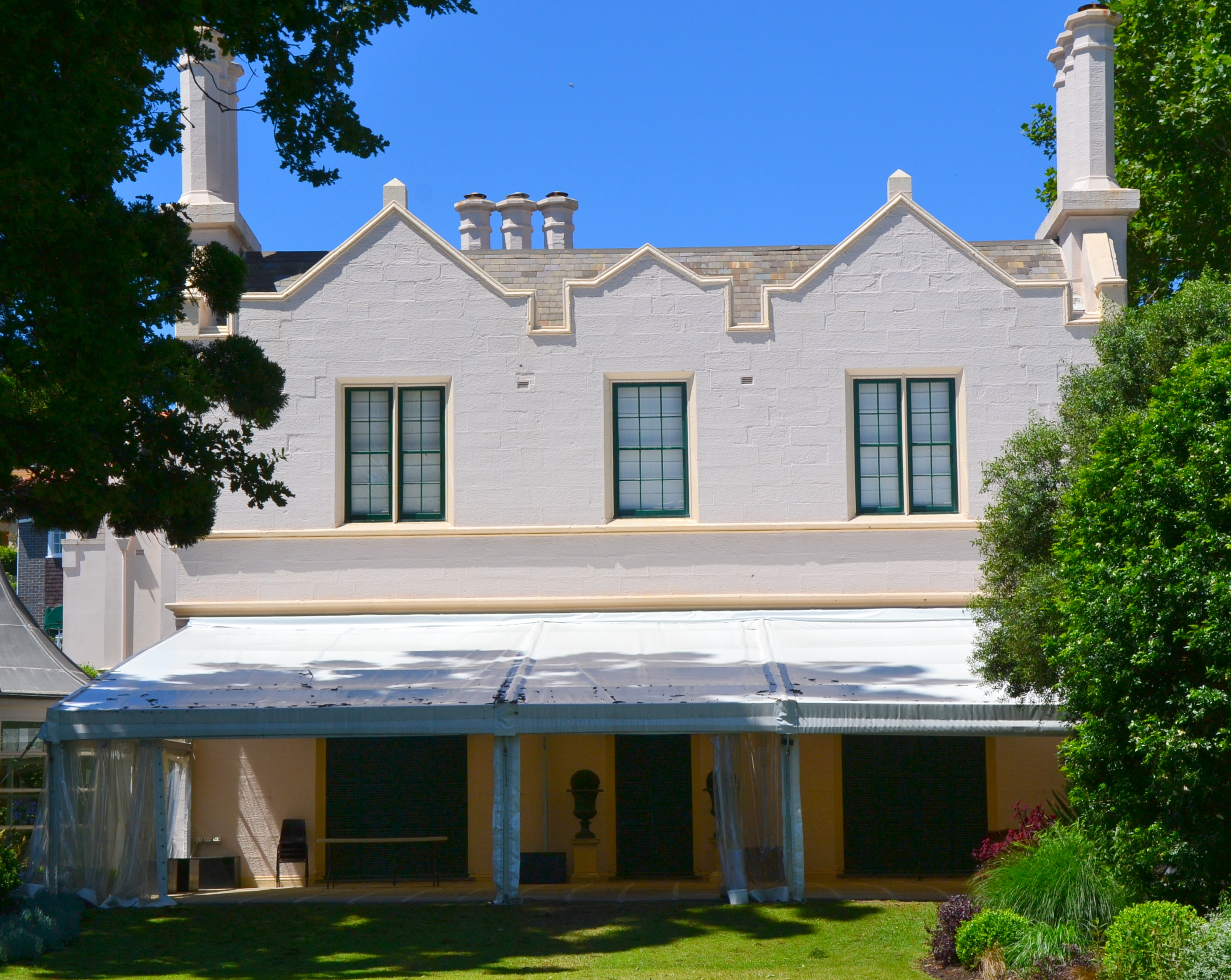
Lindesay, Darling Point, c.1834.

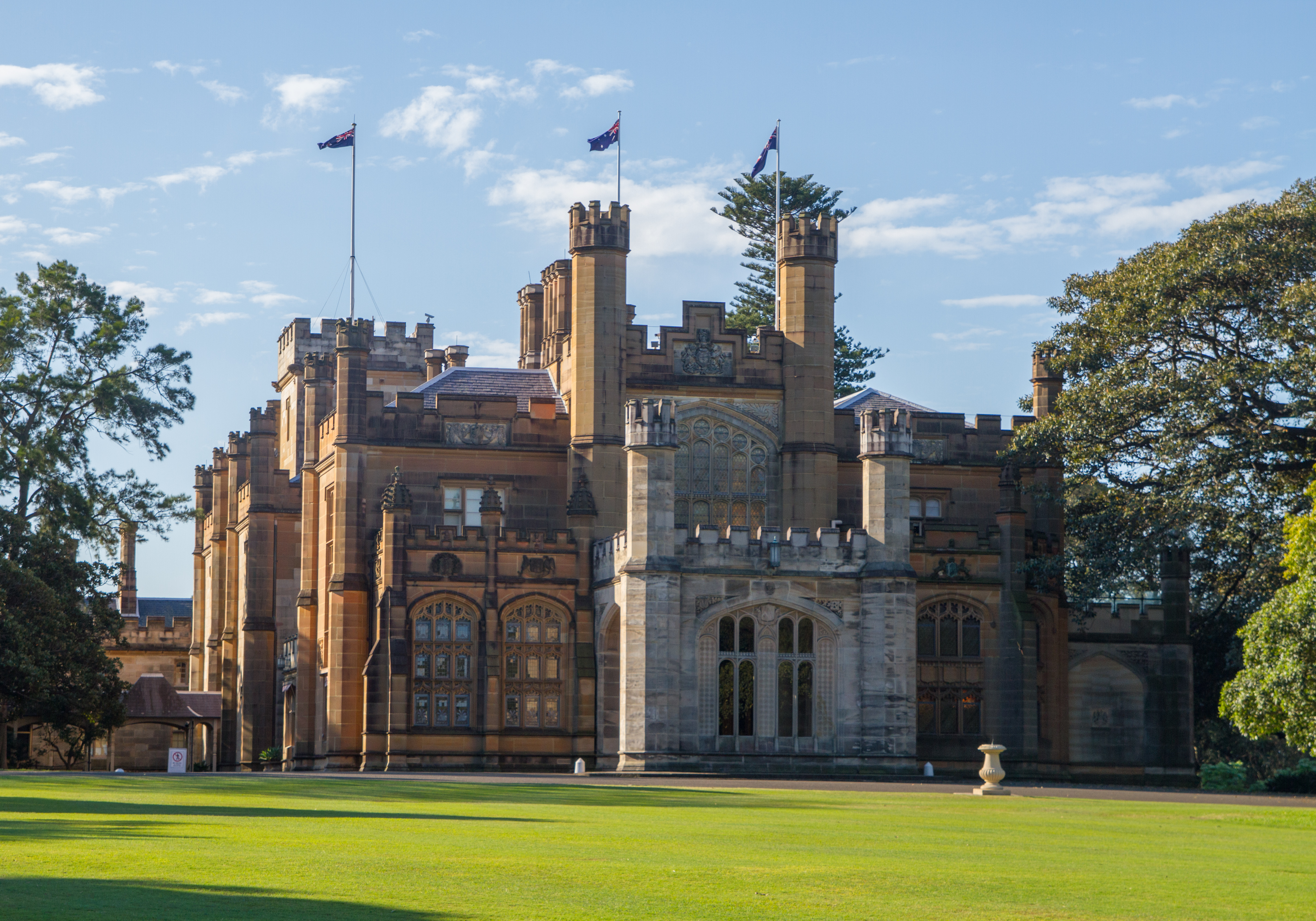
Government House, Sydney Built between 1837 and 1843.

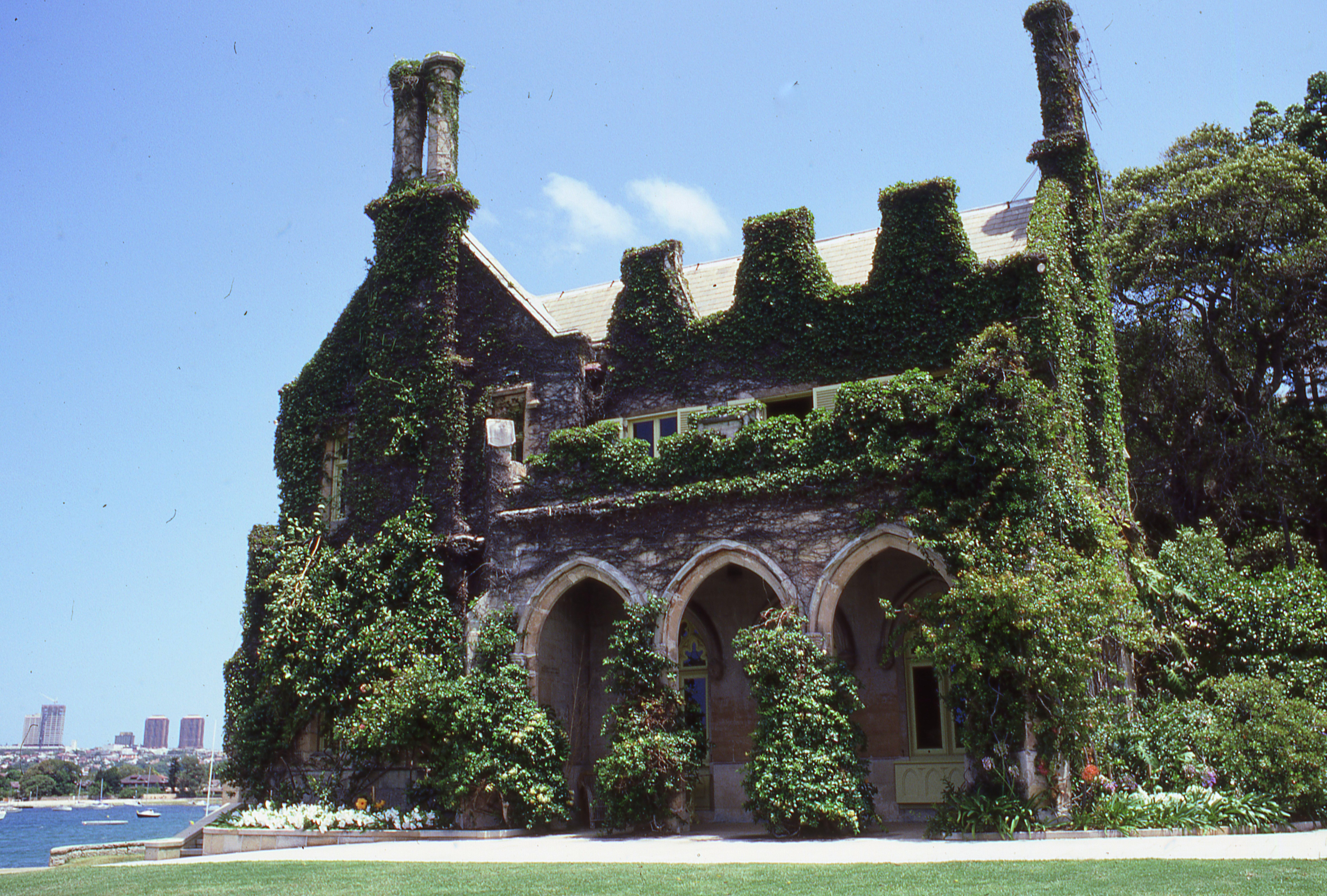
Carthona, Darling Point. Built between c.1841-45.

=== Victorian period c. 1840 – c. 1890 ===
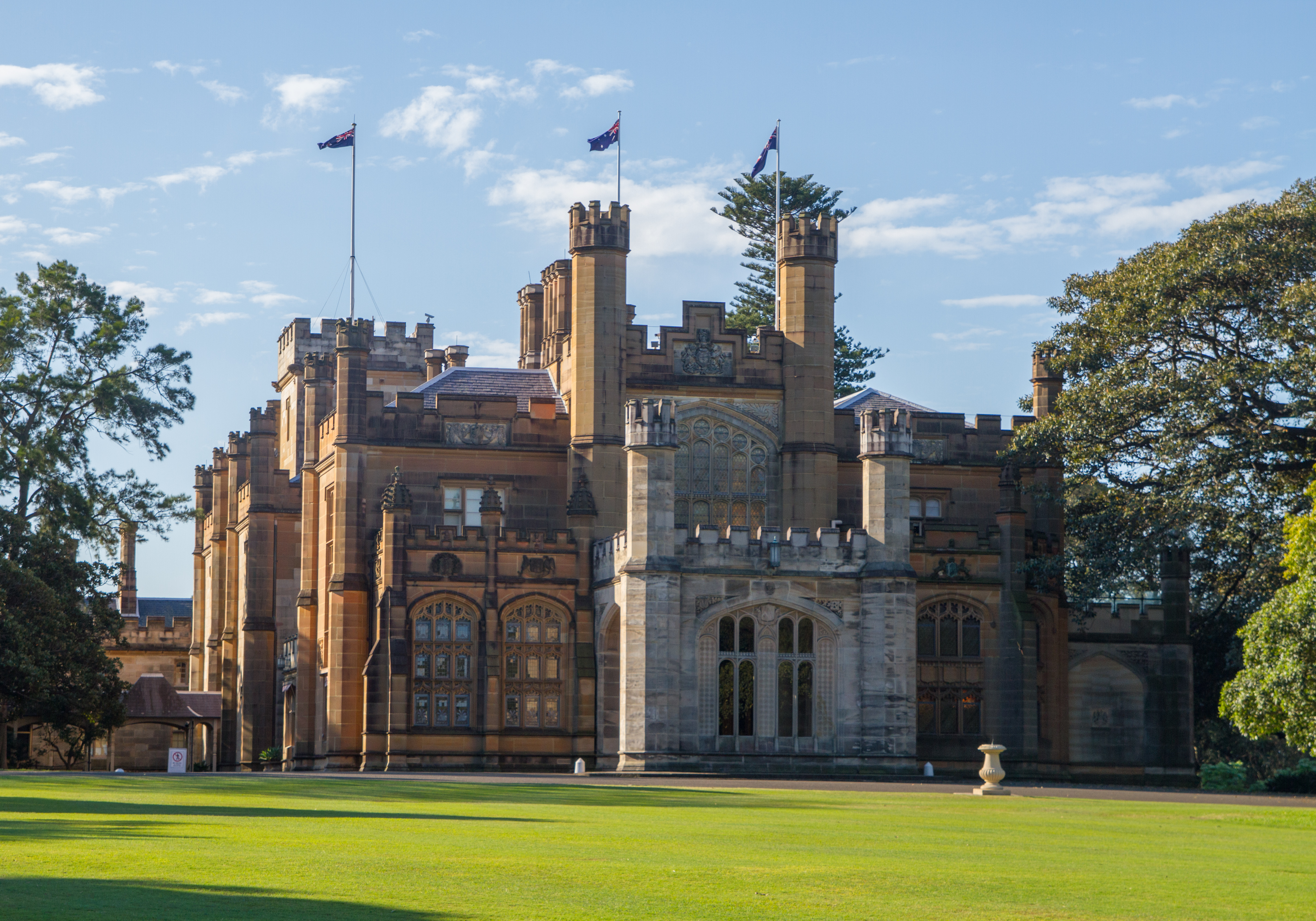
Government House, Sydney, was the most sophisticated example of Gothic Revival architecture in the British colony.

During the Victorian era, the British Empire, including Australia, was yet heavily Anglican, and thus subject to the influence of the Oxford and Cambridge Movements, which favored the use of Gothic Revival architecture. Thus, while a local magnate may have built his home in a classical style, he would potentially fund a church in the Gothic style. Thus, during the 19th century, when Australia was expanding rapidly, two forms of architecture were very evident: Gothic and the Classical styles. Originally Gothic was for God, and the Classical for the man. Later a new "self-made" Australian began to emerge, unhindered by a classical British education dictating classical gentlemanly interests. This new self-made man (like his contemporaries in Britain) would often choose Gothic as the design for his home.

The great cathedrals of the Middle Ages during the Gothic period of ecclesiastical architecture formed the inspiration for this particular architectural style; not only in residential buildings, but in many commercial structures, churches and cathedrals built during this time. St. Paul's and St. Patrick's Cathedrals in Melbourne are excellent examples of the Gothic Revival period, often referred to as Victorian Gothic. Characteristics were: steeply pitched roofs often made of slate, narrow doors and windows resolving in a Gothic pointed arch at their height (known as lancet windows), diamond pane glazing to windows imitating a stained glass affect, and intricate parapets, often of a religious nature, with a cross. In non-terrace houses, the drawing room was often pulled forward, adding a bay window to the front of the dwelling.

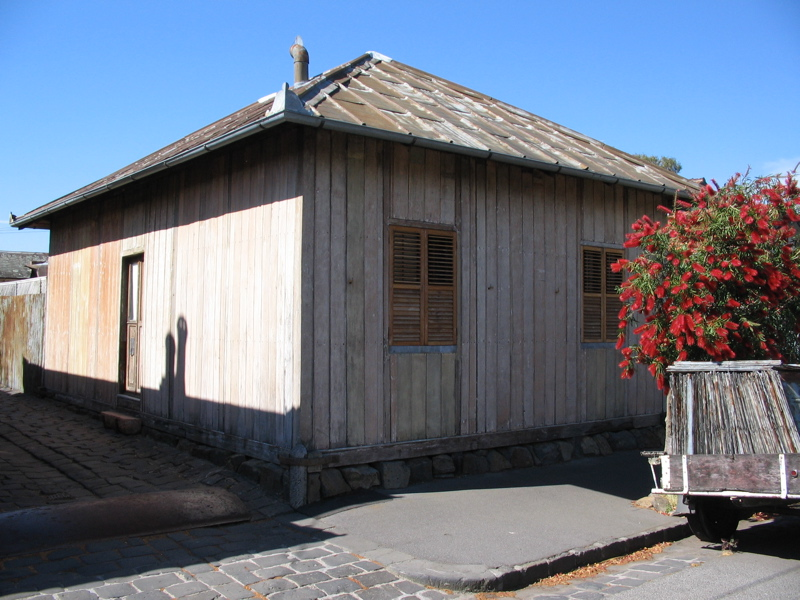
Prefabricated Victorian workers cottages were among the simple residences to appear in the suburbs of major cities in the 1850s. Rare examples like this one in Collingwood still remain today.

The Victorian style in Australia can be divided into 3 periods: Early, Mid and Late. The period in its entirety stretches from 1837 to 1901 and was named after the then Queen, Queen Victoria. Early styles featured symmetrical layouts and façades, a centrally located front and back door and a hipped roof of corrugated iron, leading to a verandah on the façade. During the 1850s cast-iron lacework came to Australia, where it made its way on to Mid and Late Victorian Homes with much the same floor plan as the Colonial Style, a central hallway with a standard 4 rooms. Weatherboards were often used, although larger homes used red brick and blue stone. In the Mid Victorian Style, decoration began to gain popularity. The bullnosed verandah roof was introduced, sidelights were added either side of the front door, and terraced houses were springing up everywhere, containing parapets and detailed dividing walls between the property boundaries. Late Victorian Style homes had perhaps the most decorative features in all of the known architectural styles to date, which is often referred to as Boom Style. Towards the end of the Victorian era, timber fretwork was being used more and more, which led into the Edwardian/Federation Styles.

==== Victorian Georgian ====
An extension and continuation of the Old Colonial Georgian style into the Victorian era. Georgian style houses built before c.1840 are characterised as Old Colonial Georgian, while buildings between c.1840 and c.1890 are characterised as Victorian Georgian. Both styles are essentially the same, being characterised by symmetrical facades, centrally located front and back doors, simple rectangular and prismatic shapes, and orderliness. Six and eight paned windows were common. In the Inter-War period, architects such as William Hardy Wilson revived the Old Colonial Georgian style, leading to the Inter-War Georgian Revival.

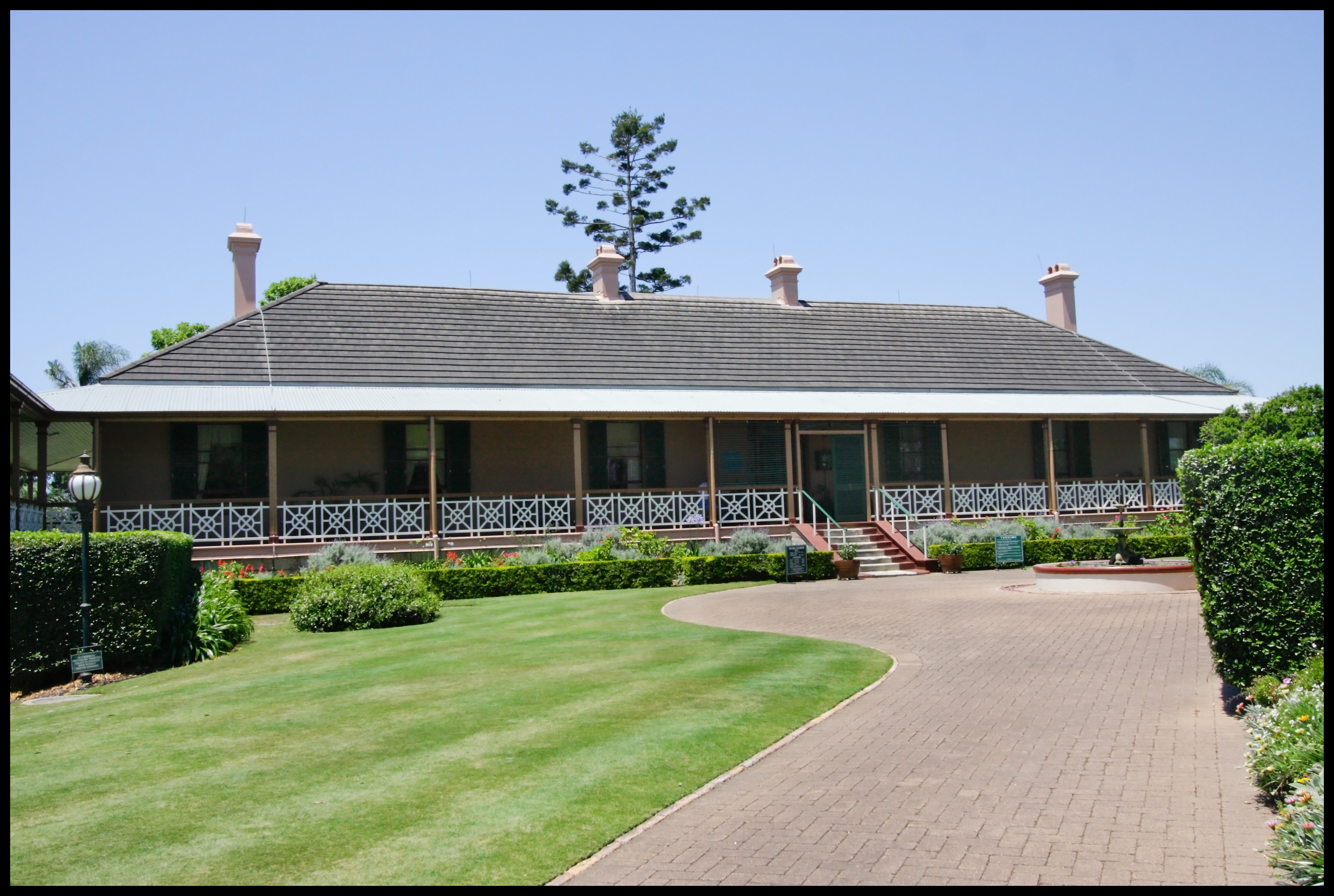
Newstead House, Brisbane; built 1846

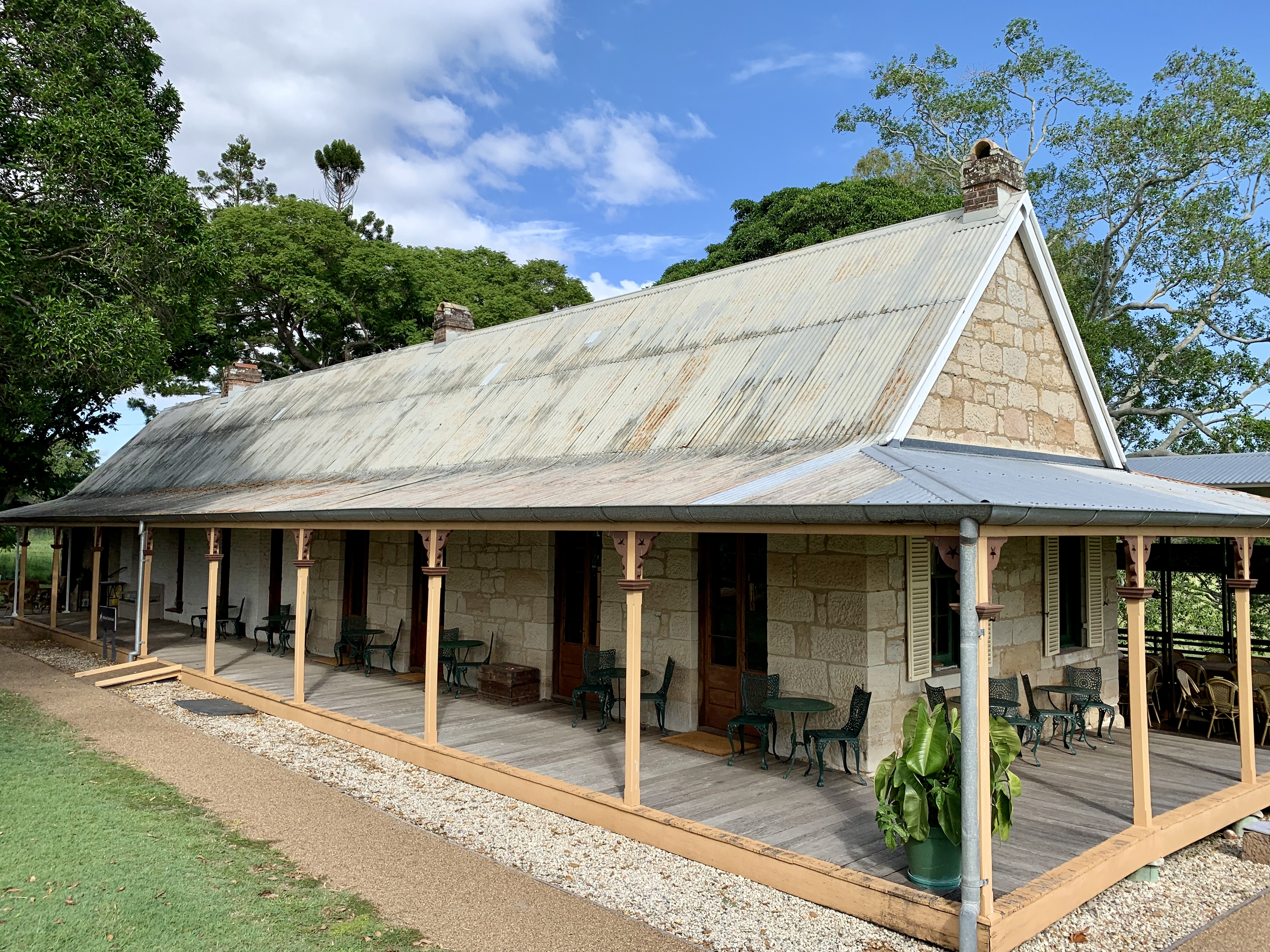
Wolston House, Wacol; built 1852–53

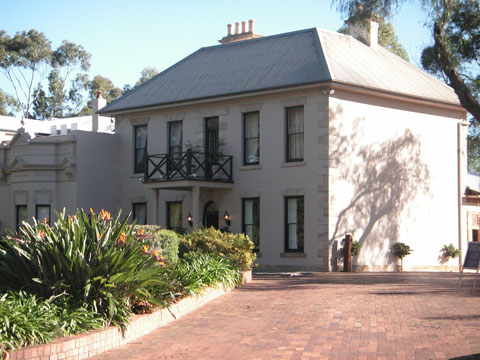
Eschol Park House, Campbelltown; completed 1858

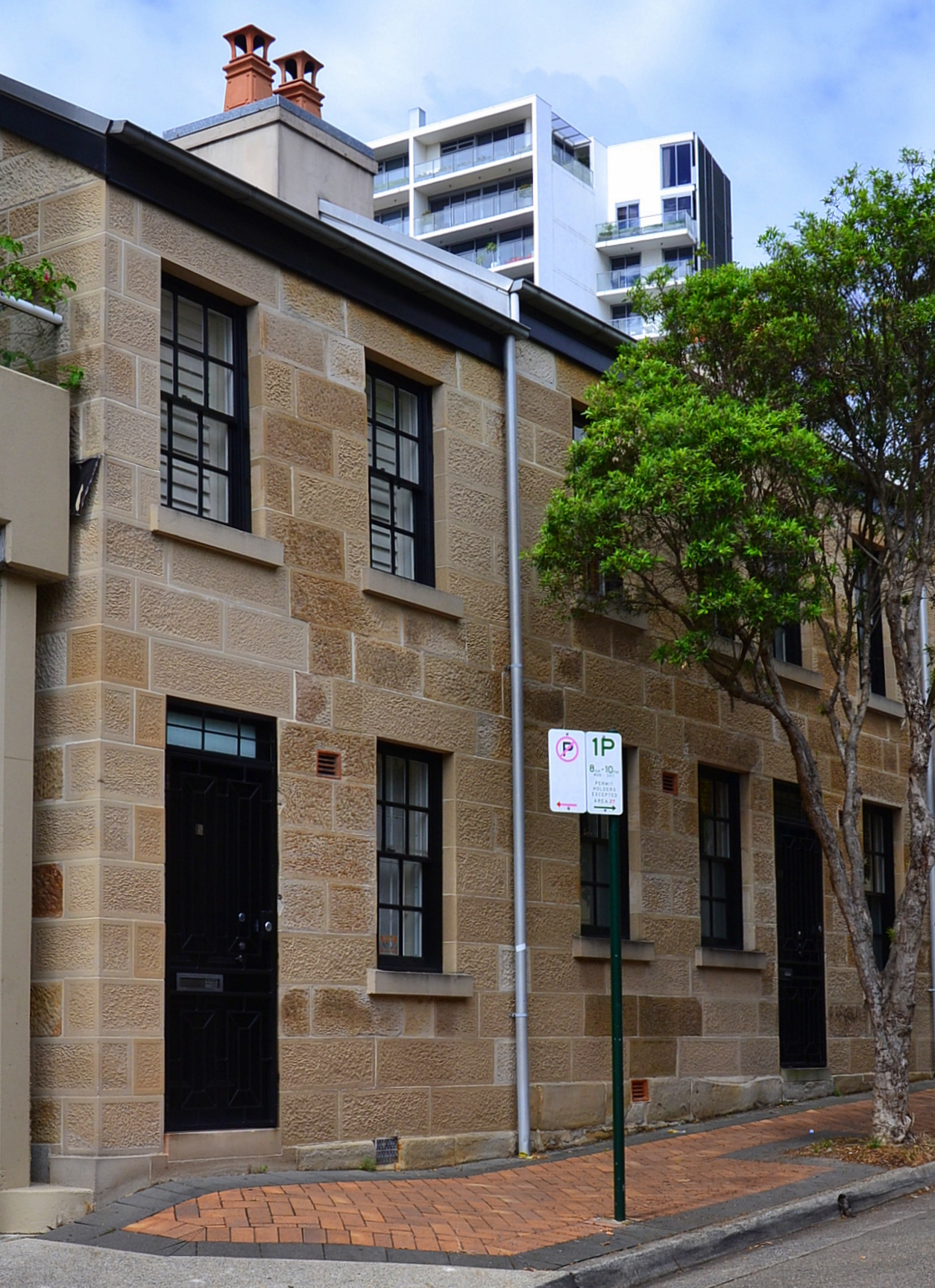
Terraces on Denham Street, Surry Hills; completed 1858

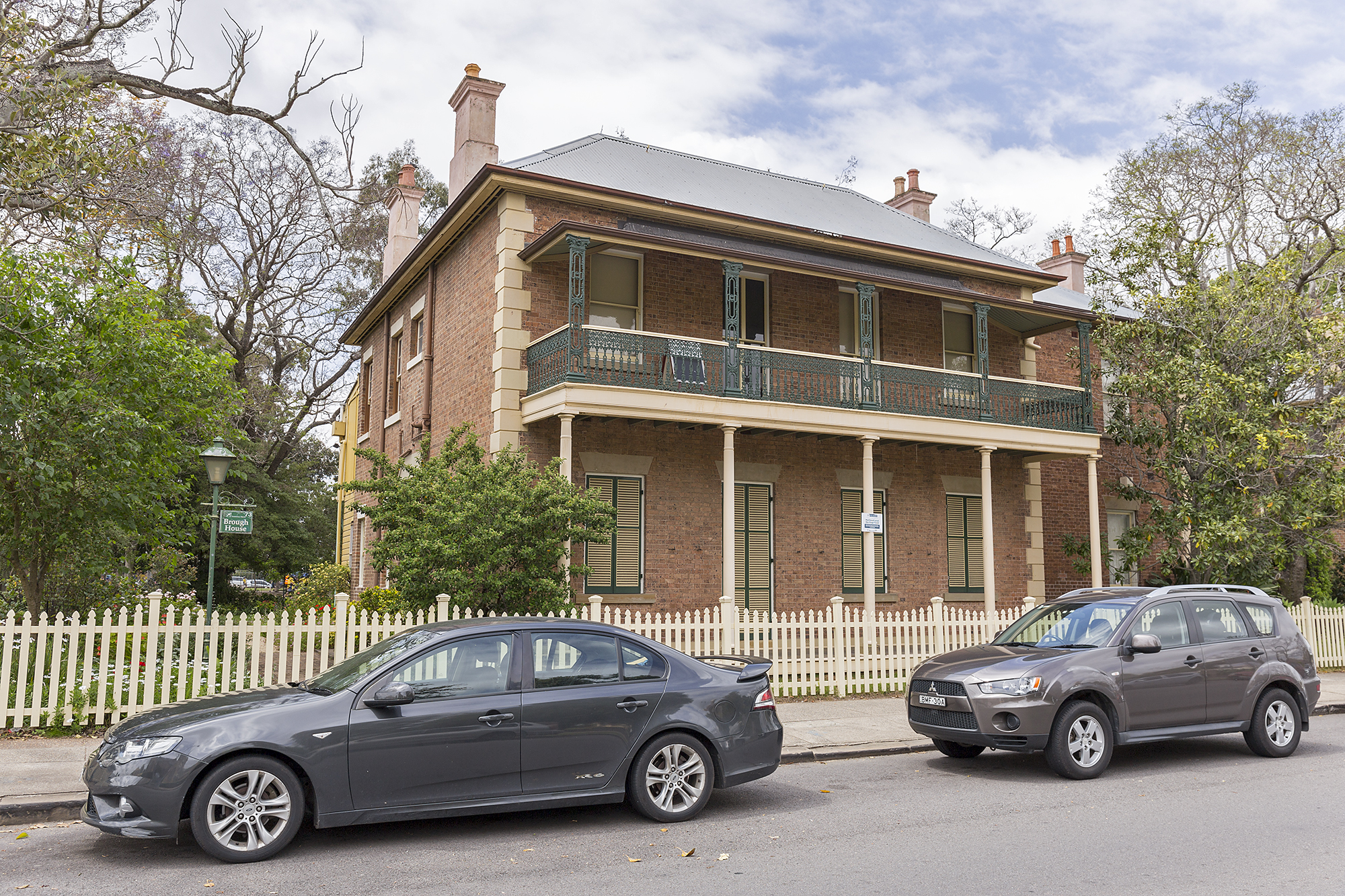
Brough House, Maitland; completed 1862

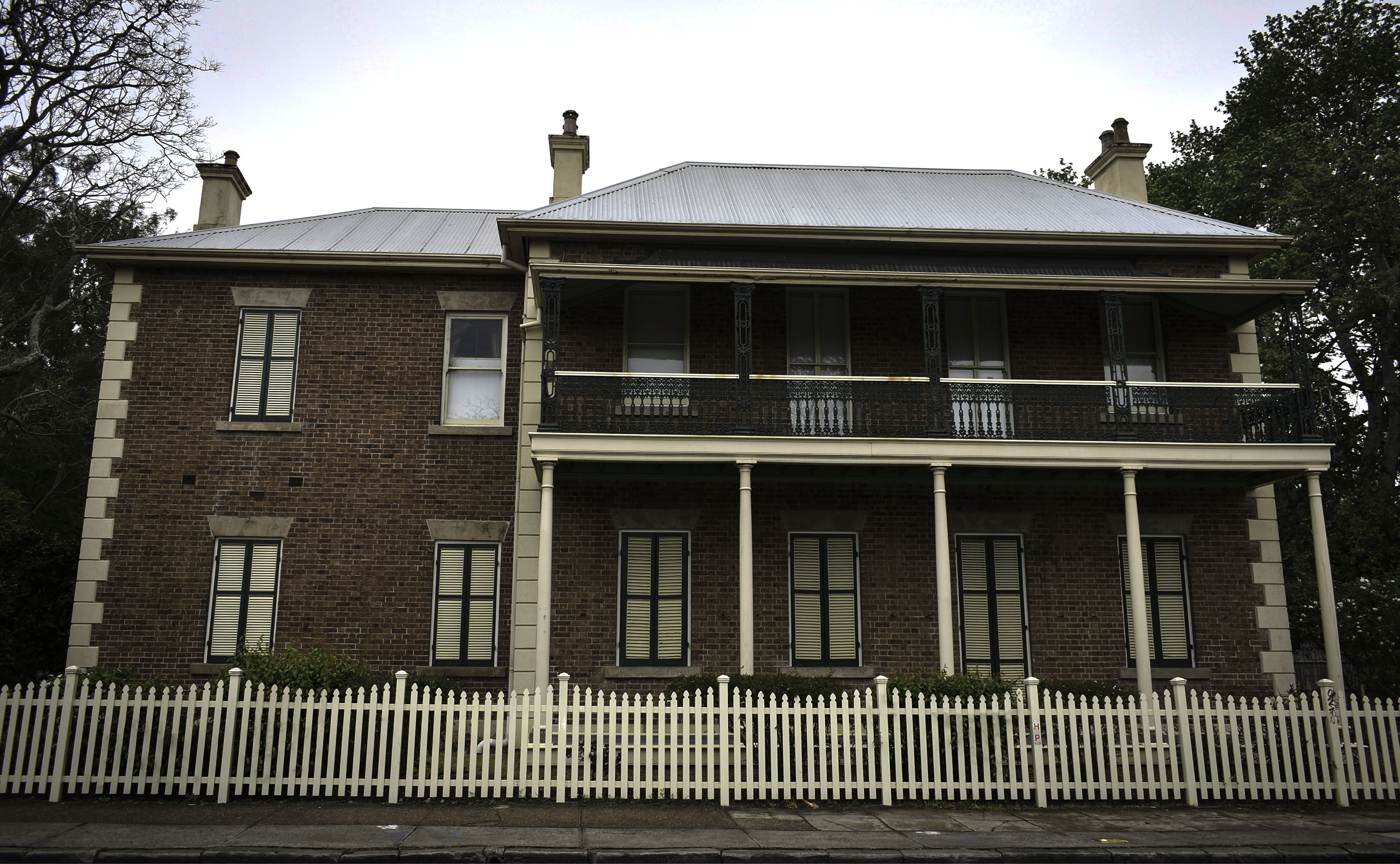
Grossmann House, Maitland; completed 1862

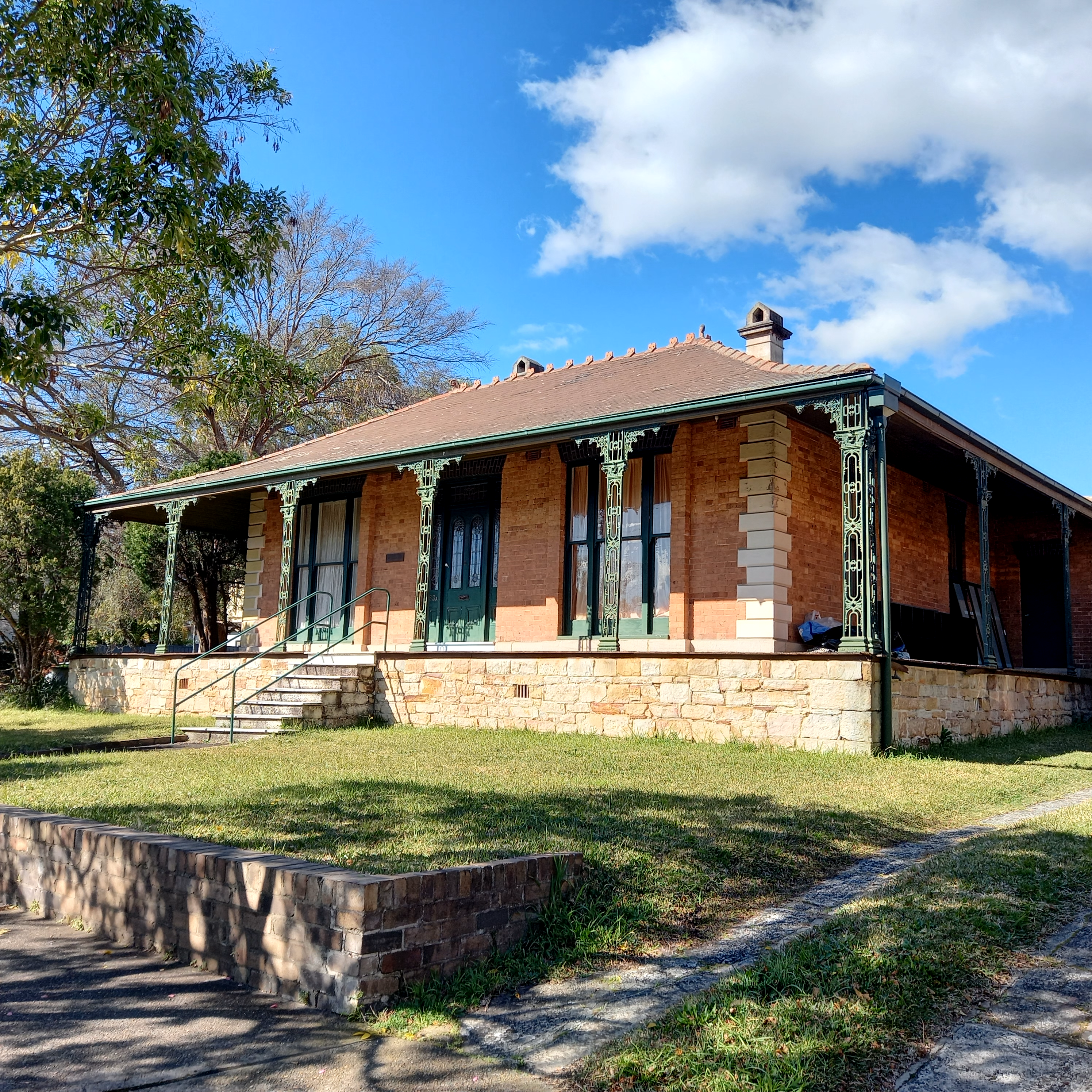
Hurstmonceux, Lewisham; c. 1874

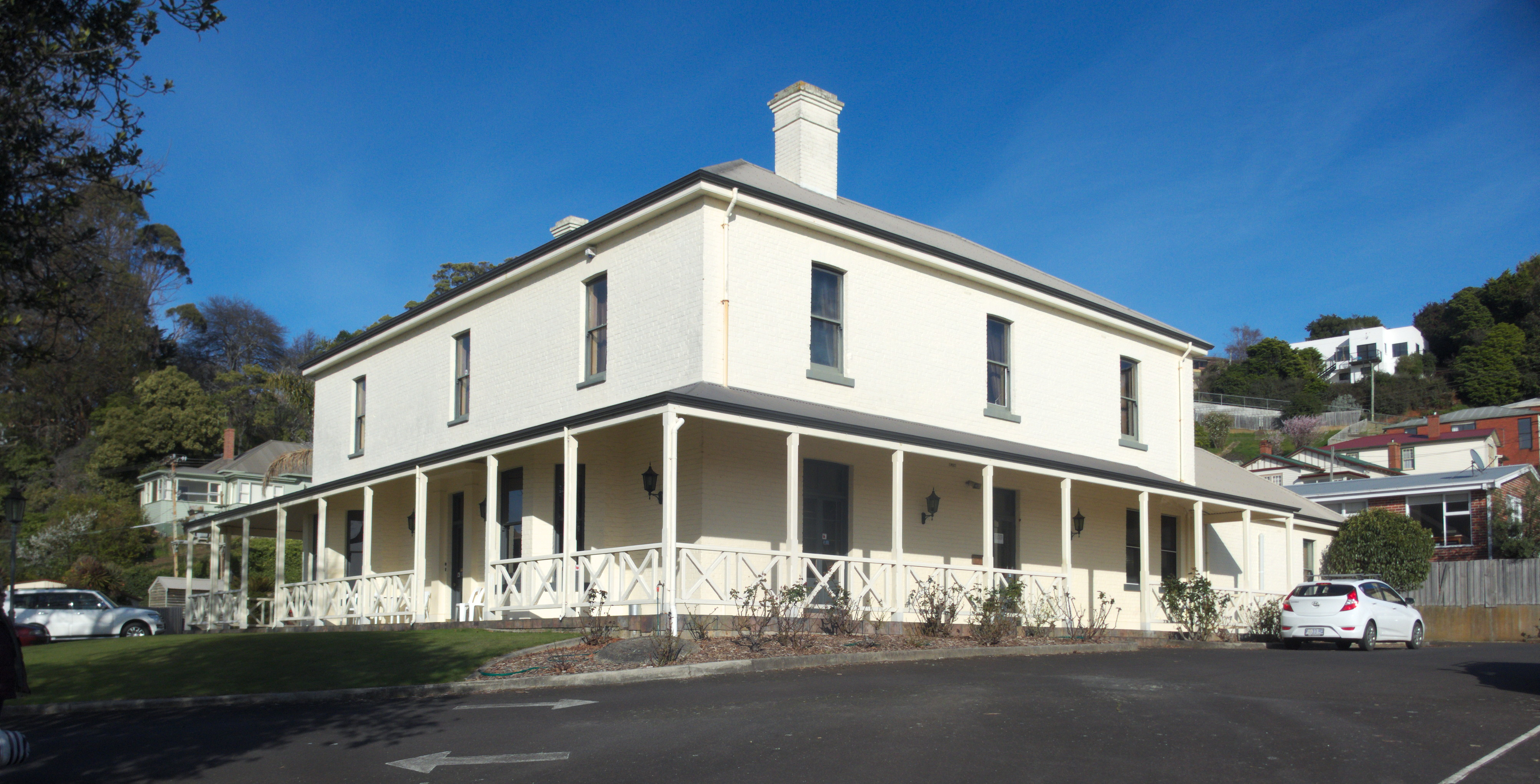
Breckenborough, Burnie; completed 1883

==== Victorian Regency ====
As with Victorian Georgian architecture, the Victorian Regency style was a continuation of the Old Colonial Regency style into the Victorian era (c. 1840 – c. 1890). The Regency style was a refinement of the Georgian style, with elaborations like a portico with columns at the front of the house.

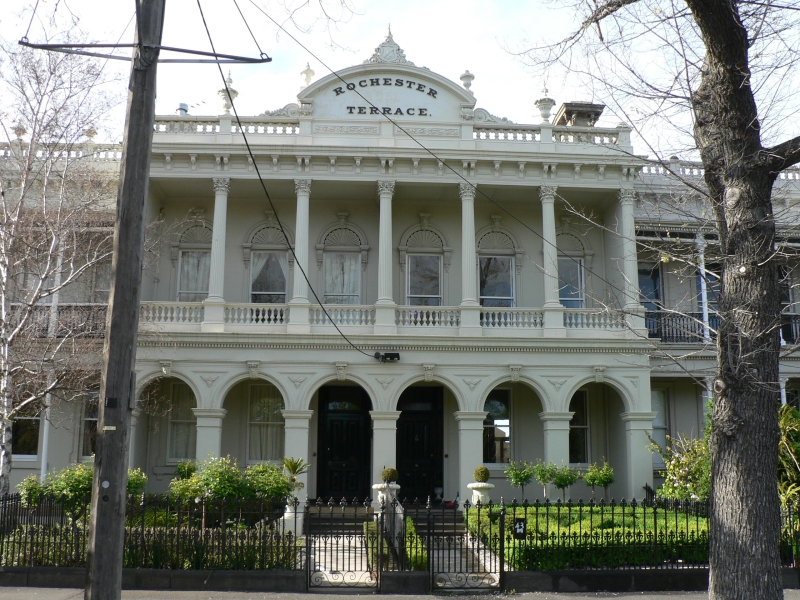
Rochester Terrace, St Vincent Place, Albert Park, Melbourne; built 1869–79

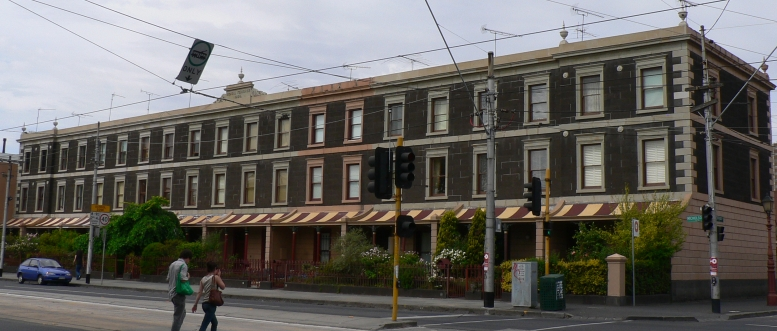
Royal Terrace, Carlton; completed 1857

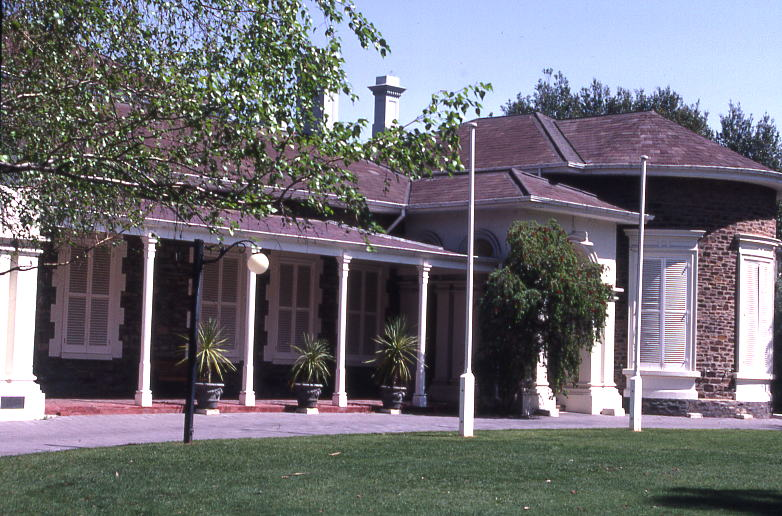
Ayers House, North Terrace, Adelaide; built c. 1858 – c. 1874

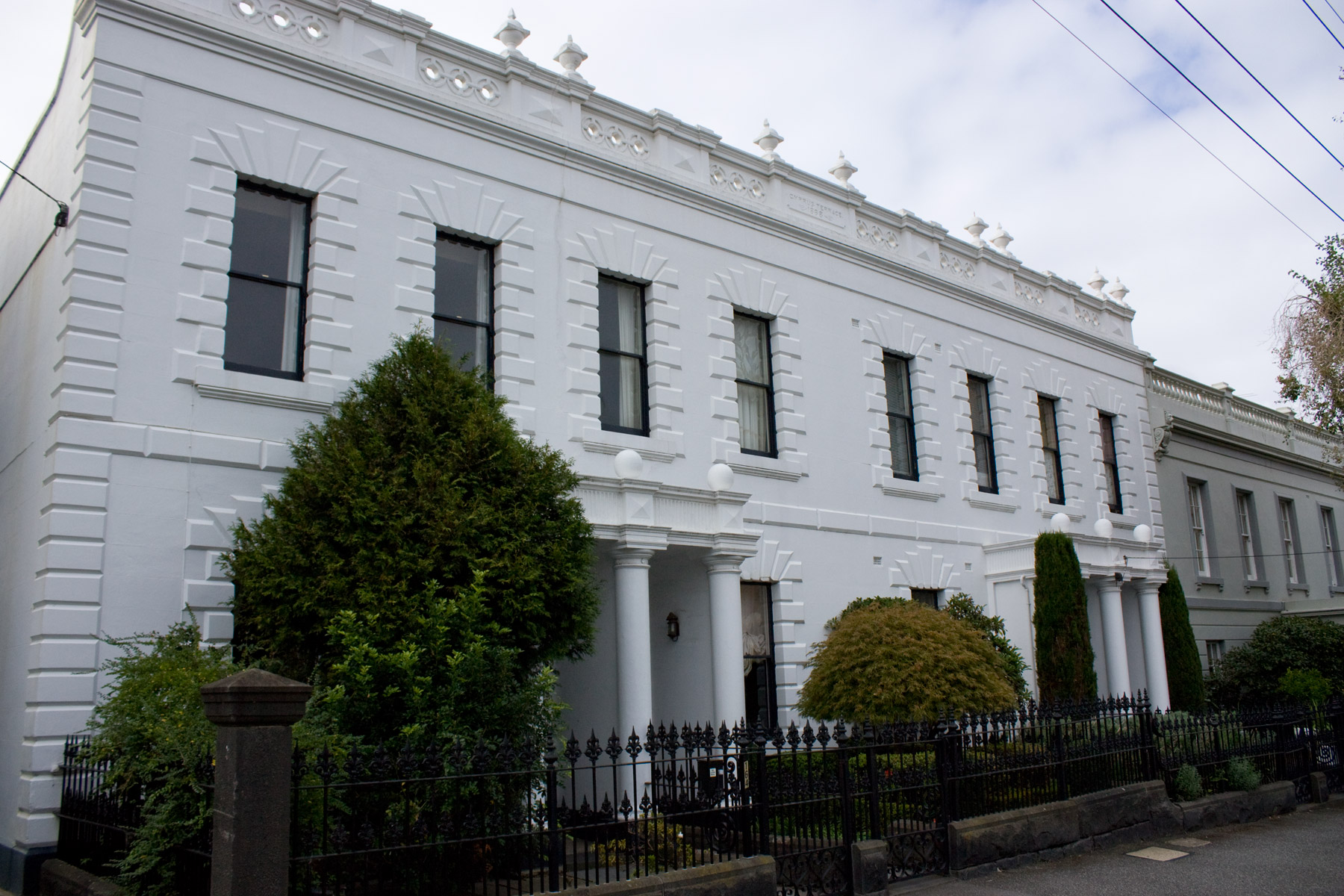
Cyprus Terrace, East Melbourne; designed in 1868

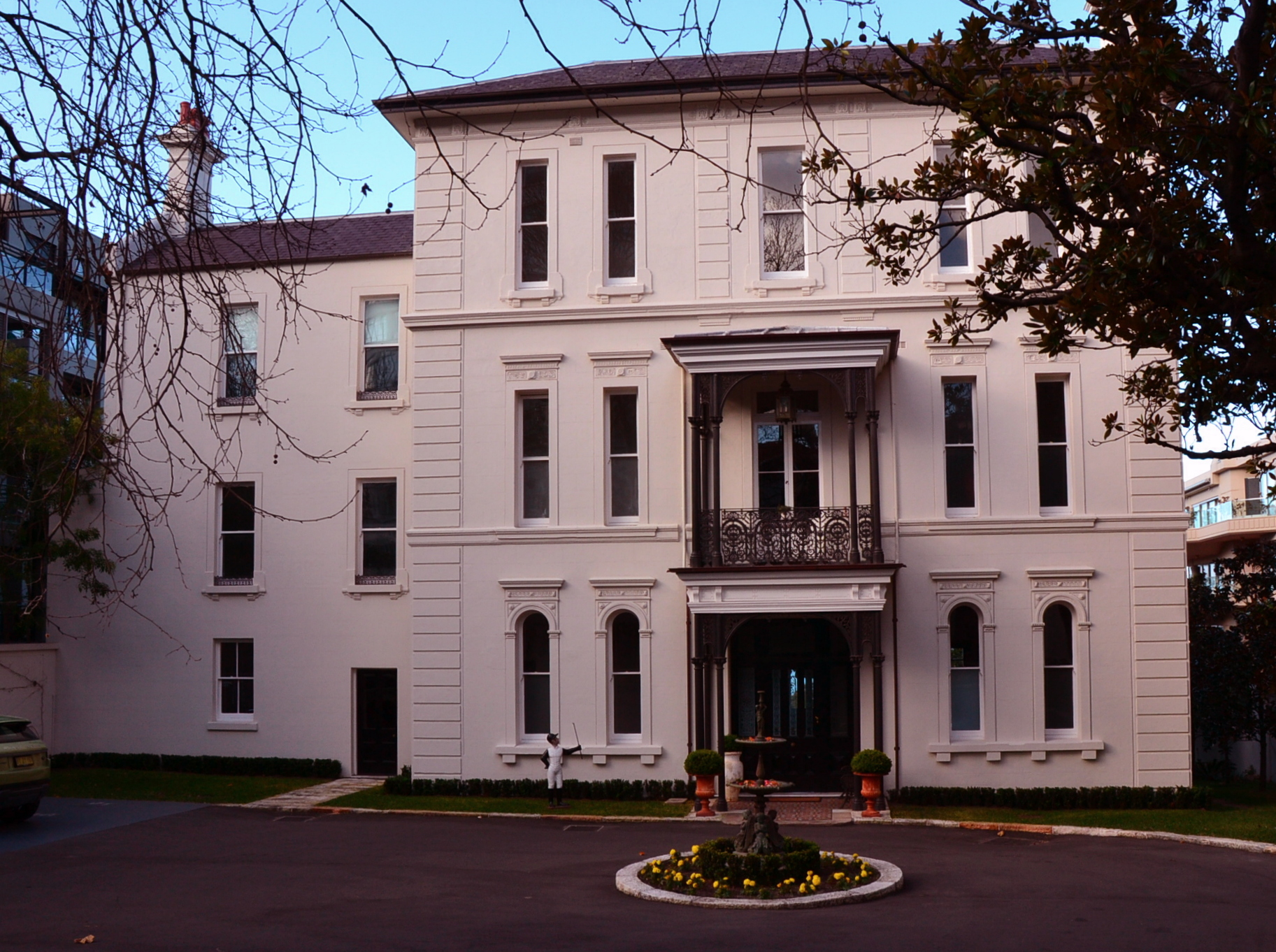
Jenner House, Potts Point; completed 1871

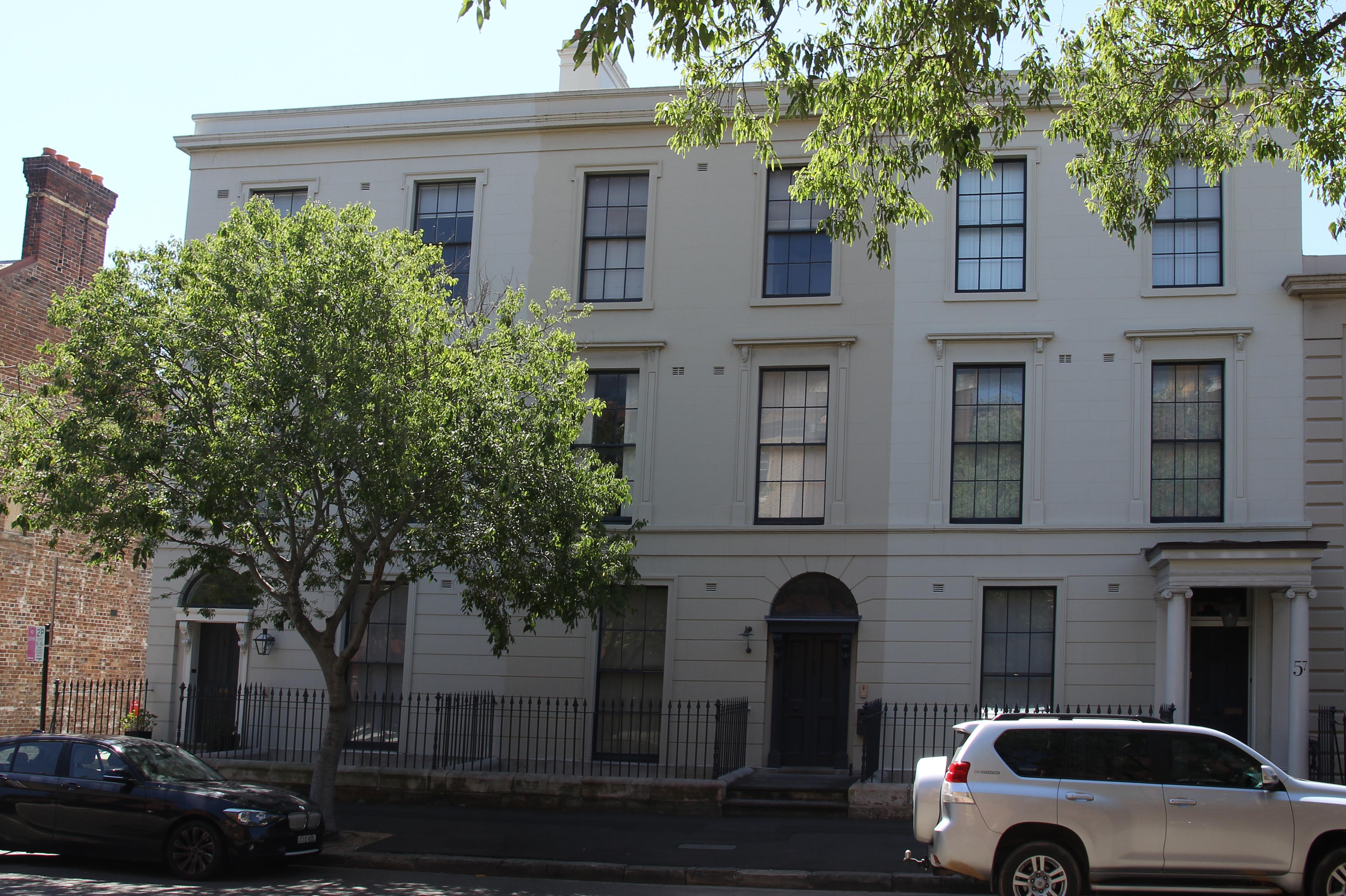
57-61 Lower Fort Street, Millers Point

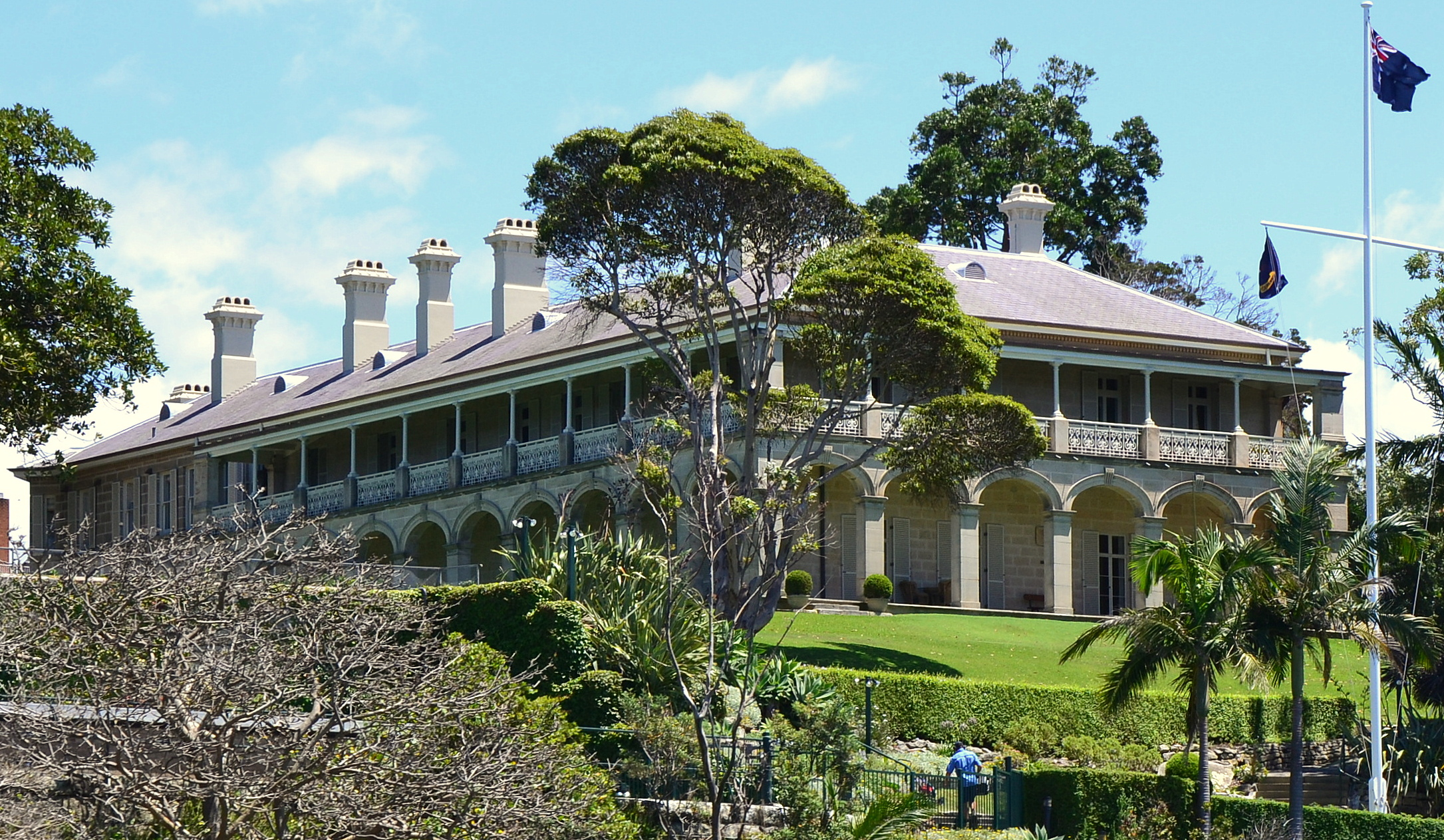
Admiralty House, Kirribilli

==== Victorian Free Classical ====
In the Old Colonial era, buildings of the Old Colonial Grecian style attempted to emulate the refined elegance of ancient Greece. However, in the Victorian era, Australia's booming migrant society sought an architectural language to flaunt its newfound prosperity, and found it in an exaggerated Classical style that took inspiration from the "extroverted pomp of imperial Rome and the grandeur of the fully developed European Renaissance." The Classical style embodied solidity, permanency, reason and rationality. There were two main sub-divisions of this style. The Victorian Academic Classical style involved strict and faithful interpretation of historical examples, and most examples of this style are non-residential, being often used for town halls, banks, and other public buildings. Buildings the Academic style were symmetrical in plan and massing, and involved correct application of one of the five architectural orders to determine proportions. However the restrictions of this style did not suit the ebullient attitudes of the era, and many buildings were built in the Victorian Free Classical style; which employed classical elements with little care shown towards the proper rules of the Academic style. Buildings in the Free style were often asymmetrical and combined elements of the classical language idiosyncratically, sometimes in combination with other styles.

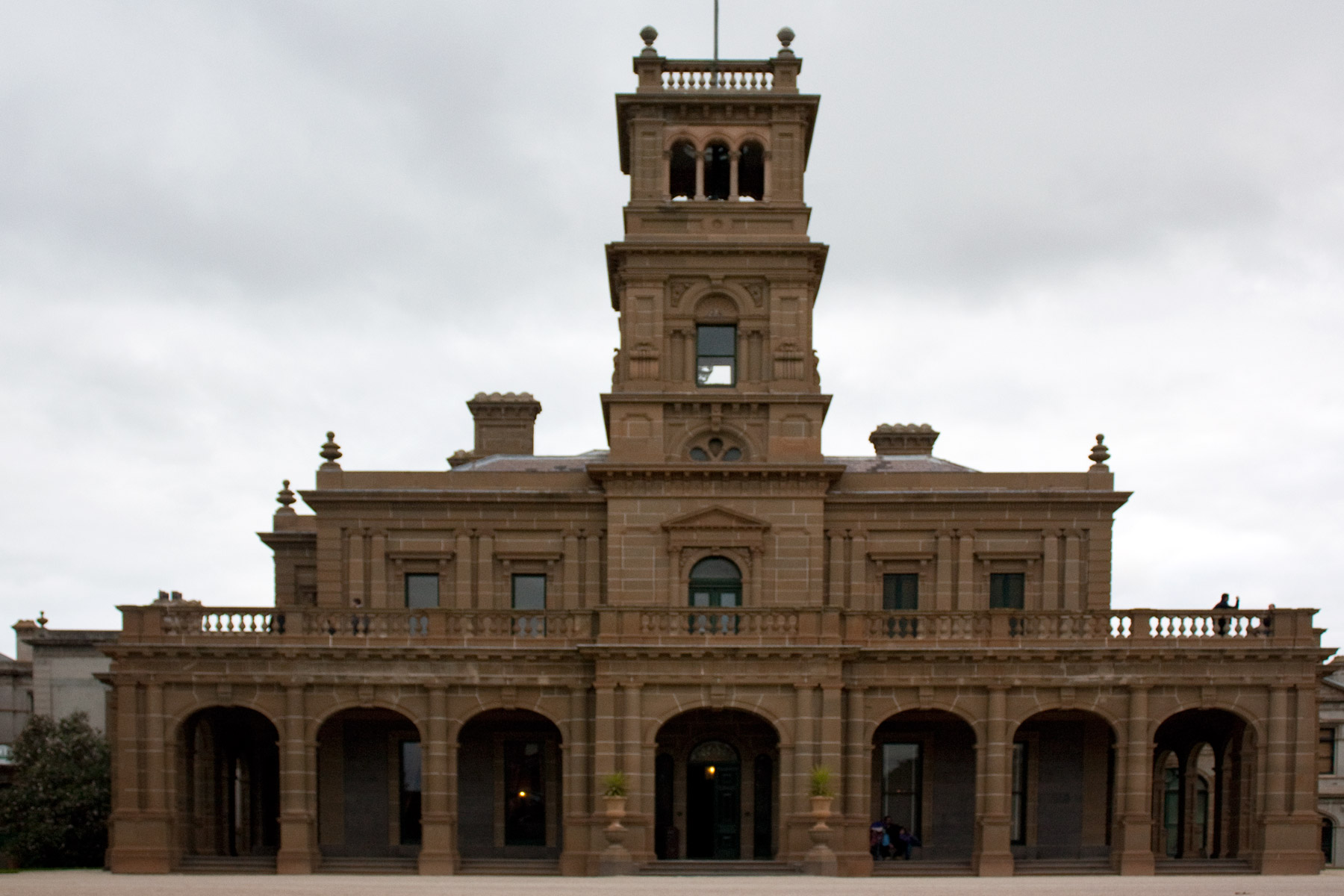
Werribee Park, Werribee; completed in 1877

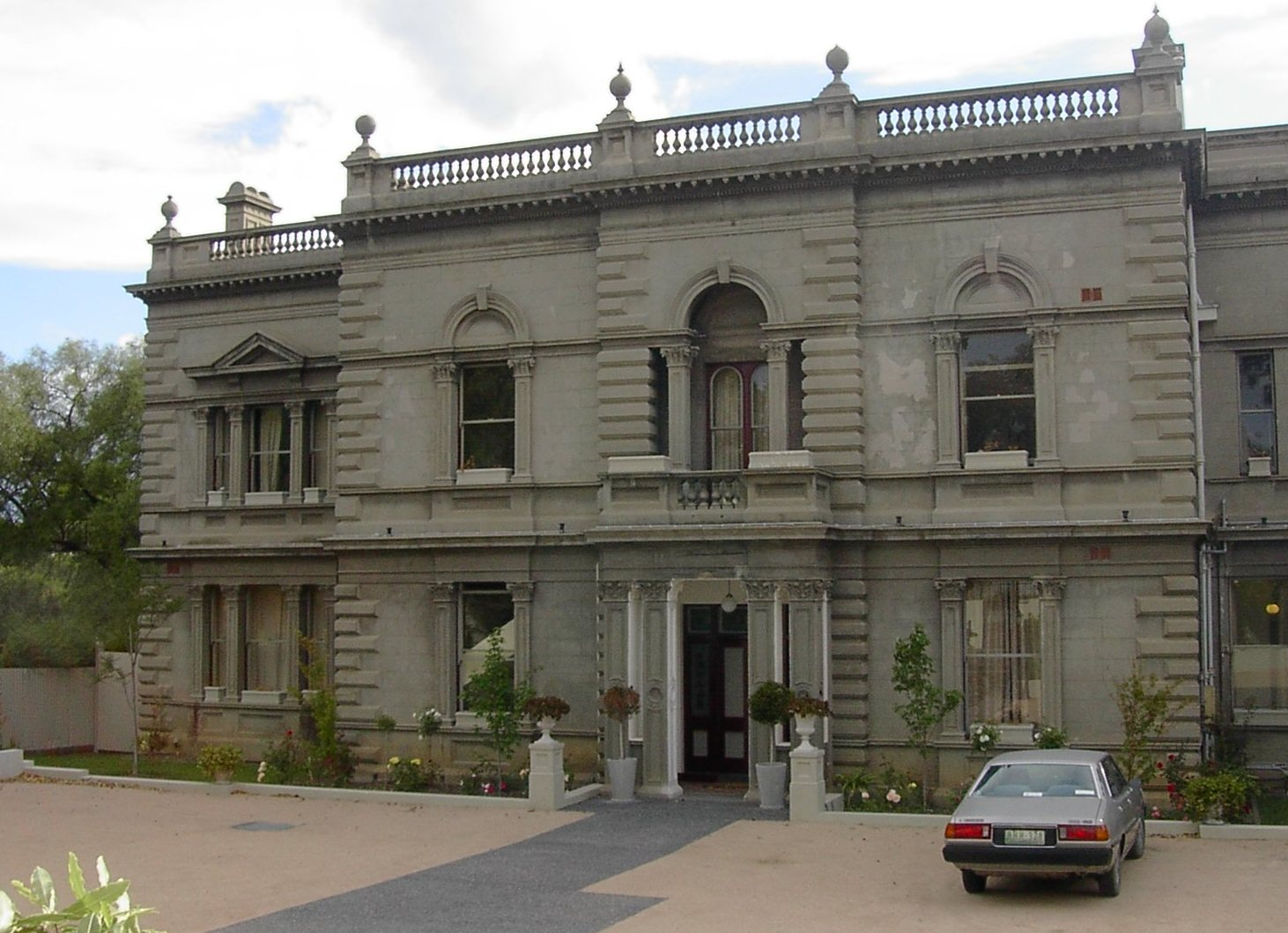
Eildon Mansion, St Kilda. Completed 1877.

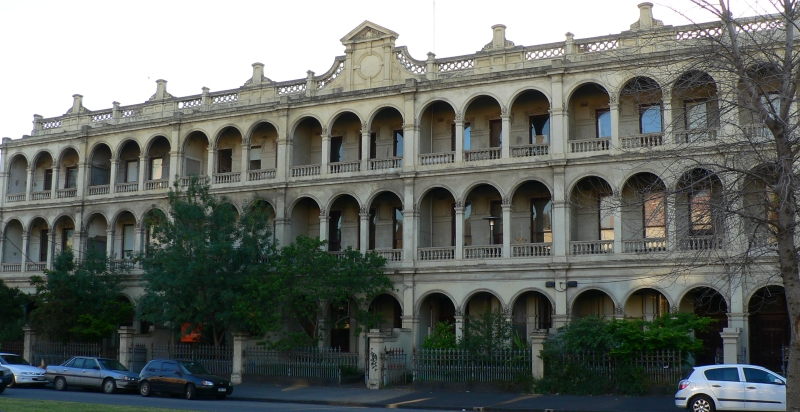
Drummond Terrace, Carlton. Completed 1891.

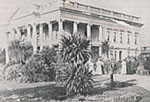
Earlsbrae Hall, Essendon

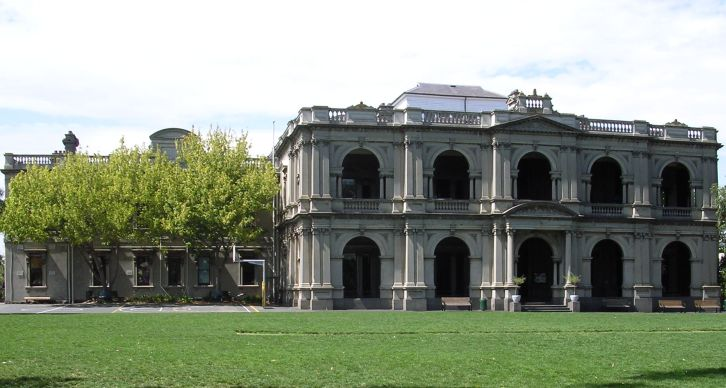
Valentine's Mansion, Malvern

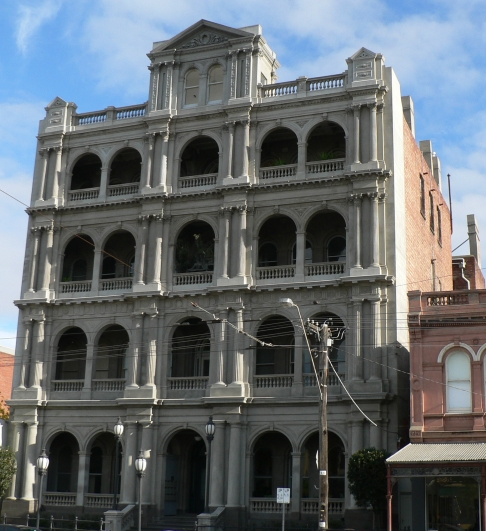
Biltmore apartments, Albert Park

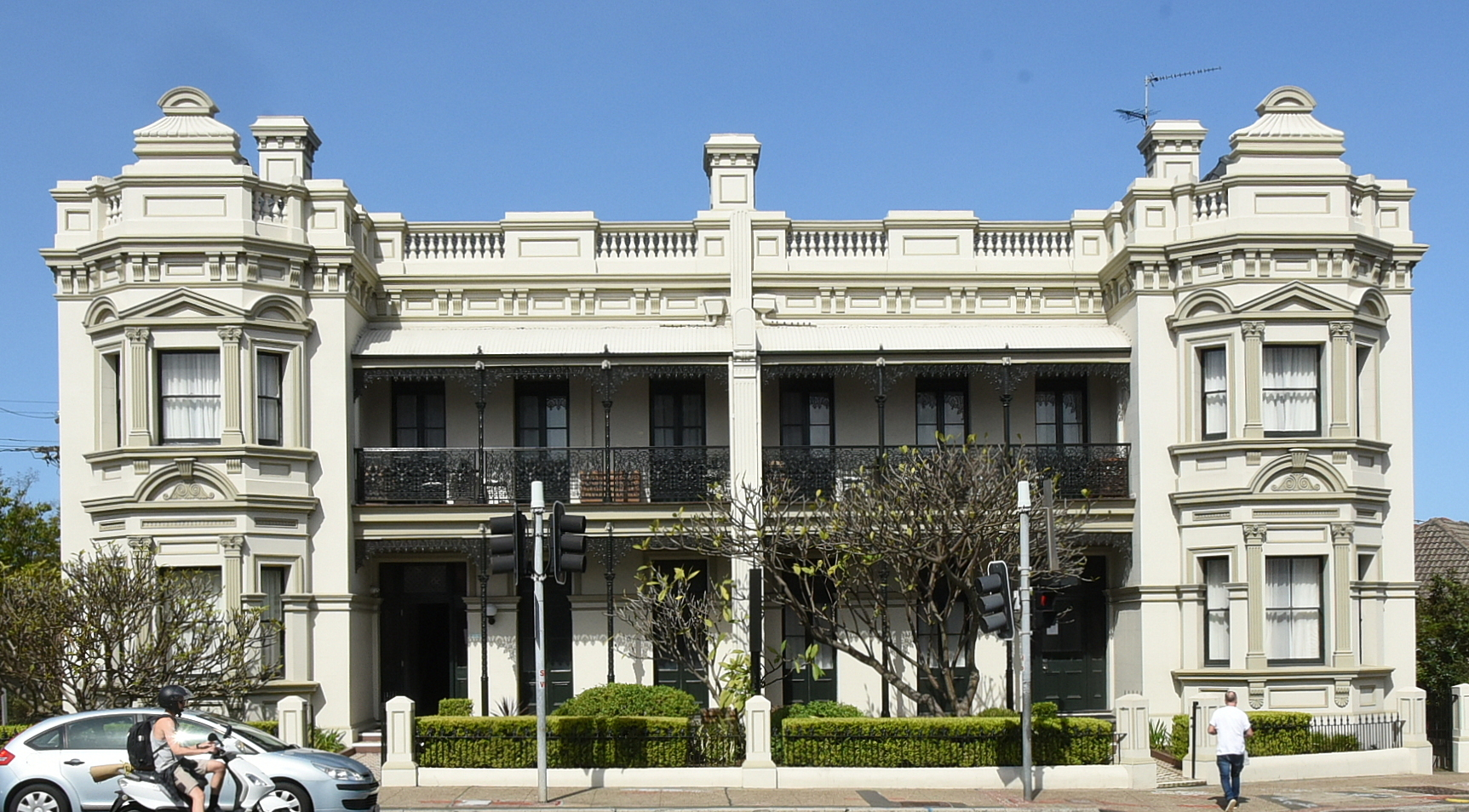
Corana and Hygeia Terraces, Randwick

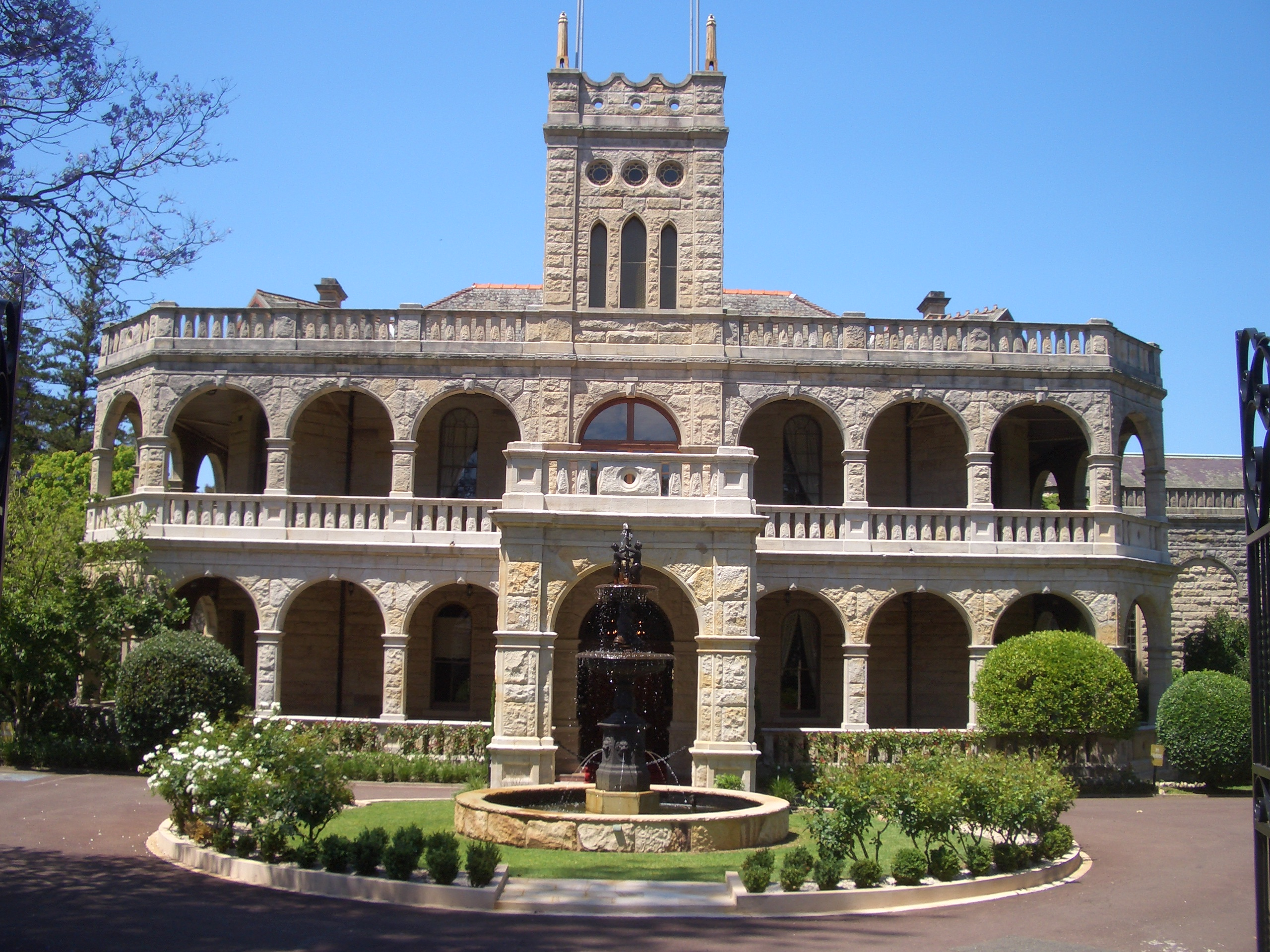
Curzon Hall, Marsfield

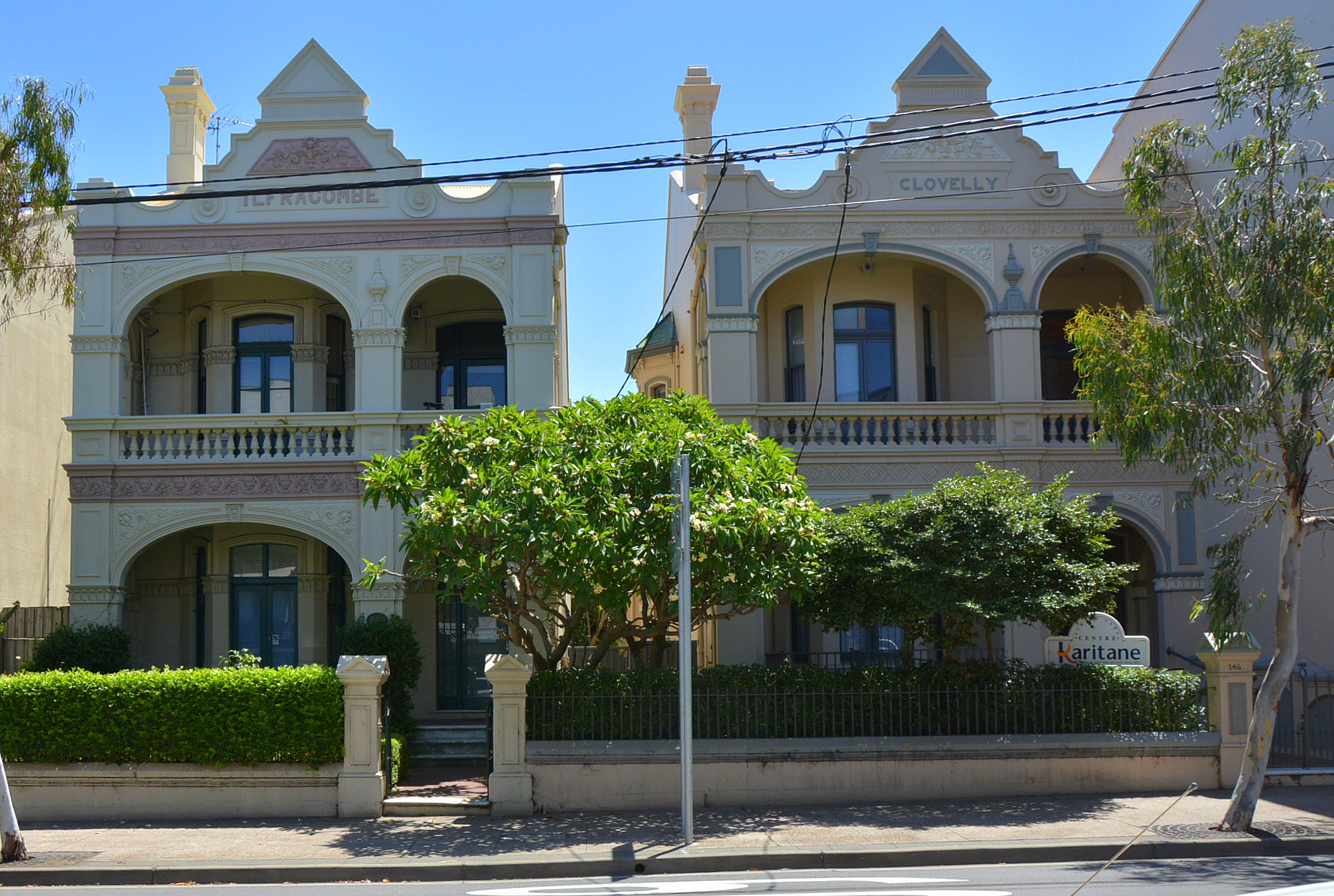
IIfracombe and Clovelly Terraces, Randwick

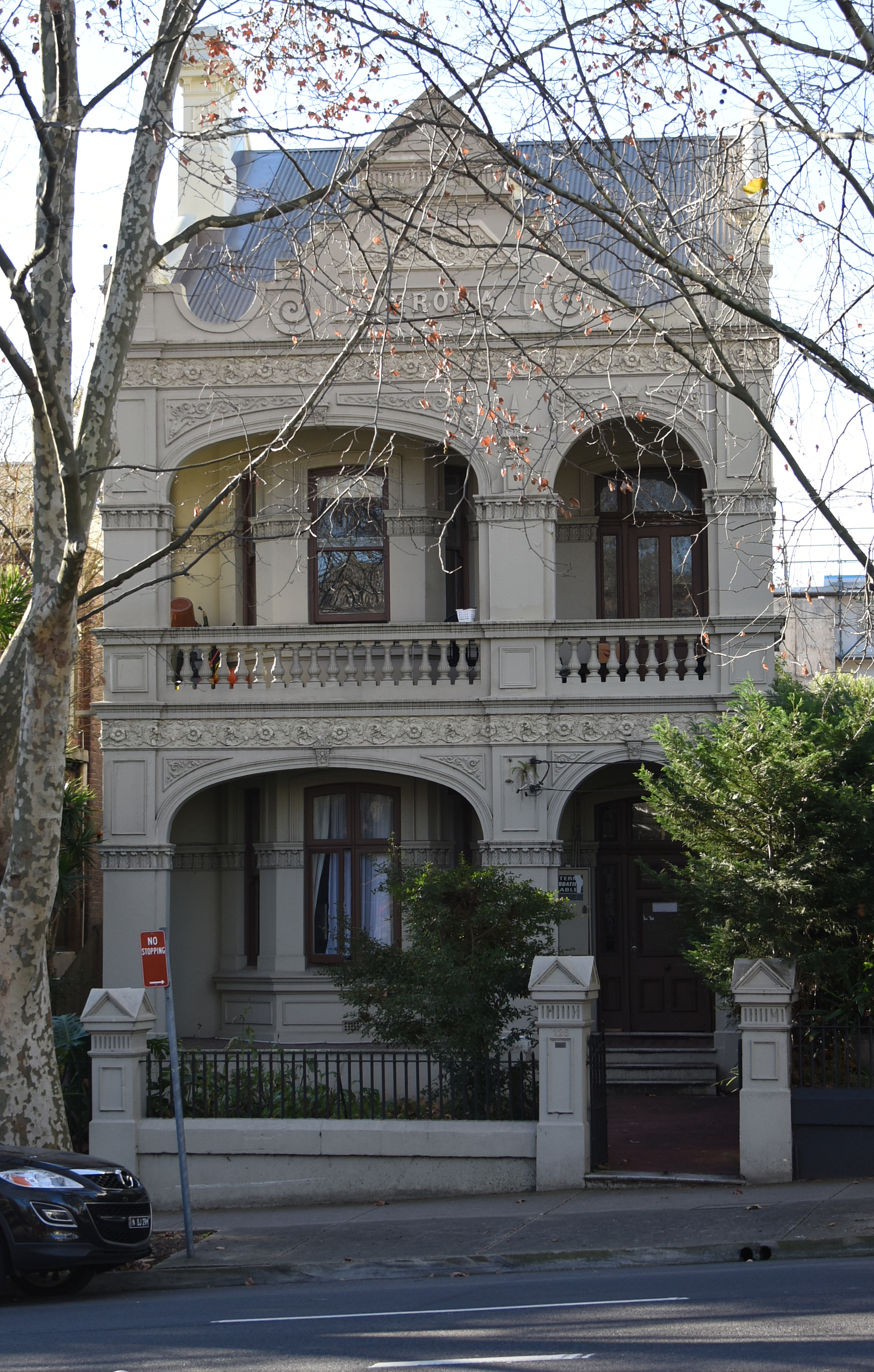
Verona, Randwick

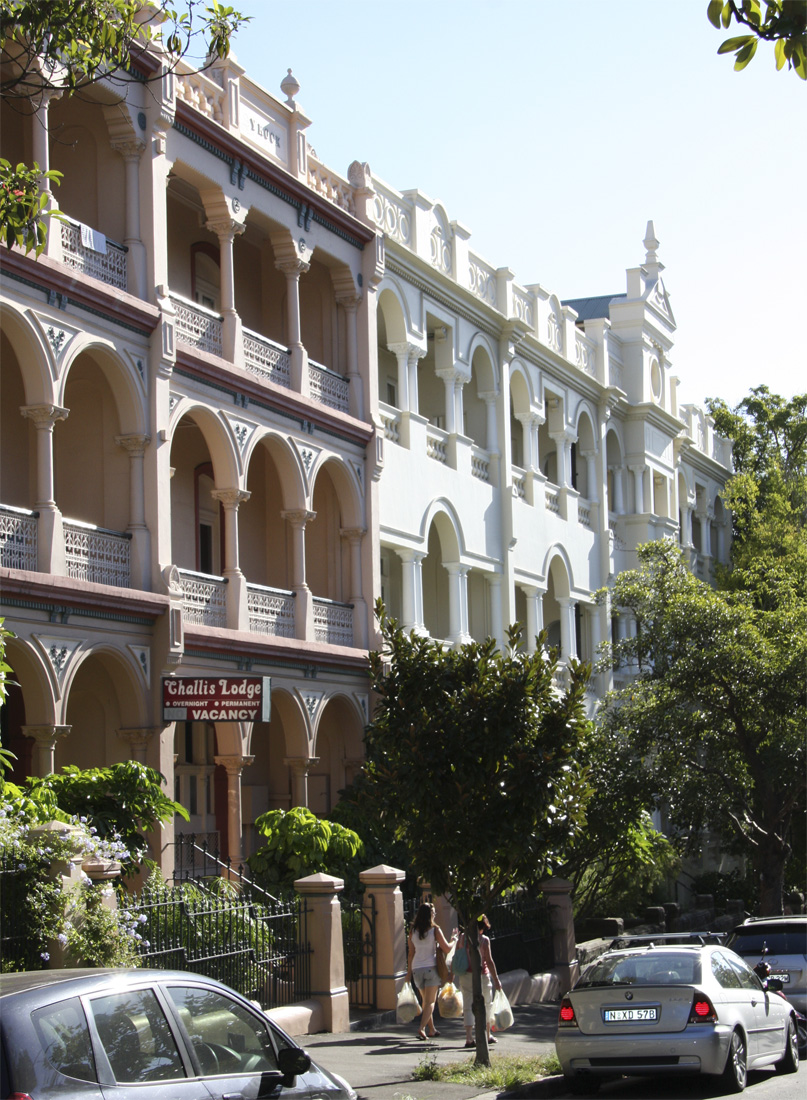
Terraces in Potts Point

==== Victorian Mannerist ====
In Australia, the Victorian Mannerist style takes is place between Victorian Academic Classical and Victorian Free Classical style, combining the scholarly rigour of the former with the permissiveness of the latter.

— Richard Apperly, Robert Irving, & Peter L. Reynolds (1989), A Pictorial Guide to Identifying Australian Architecture: Styles and Terms from 1788 to the Present.

A classical style that referenced the Italian Mannerist movement. Buildings in this style used classical elements in inventive and imaginative ways. Columns, pilasters, arches, and pediments were crammed into deep and richly modelled stucco facades.

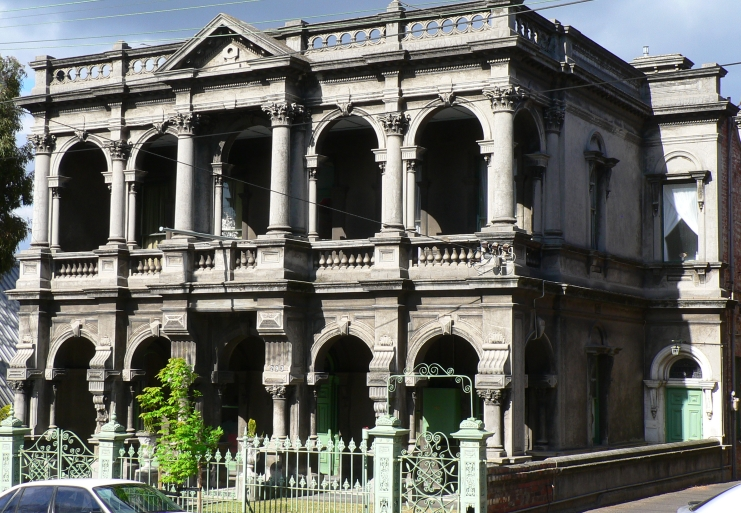
Lalor House, Richmond. Circa 1888.

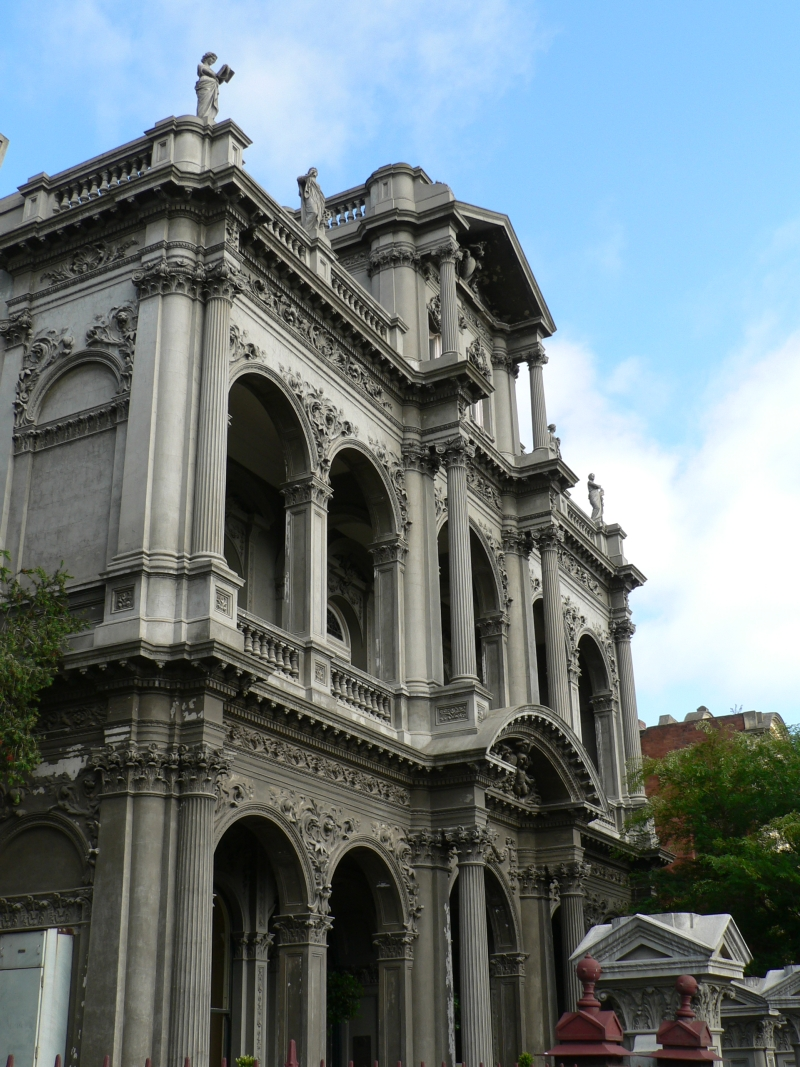
Benvenuta, Parkville. Completed 1893.

==== Victorian Italianate ====
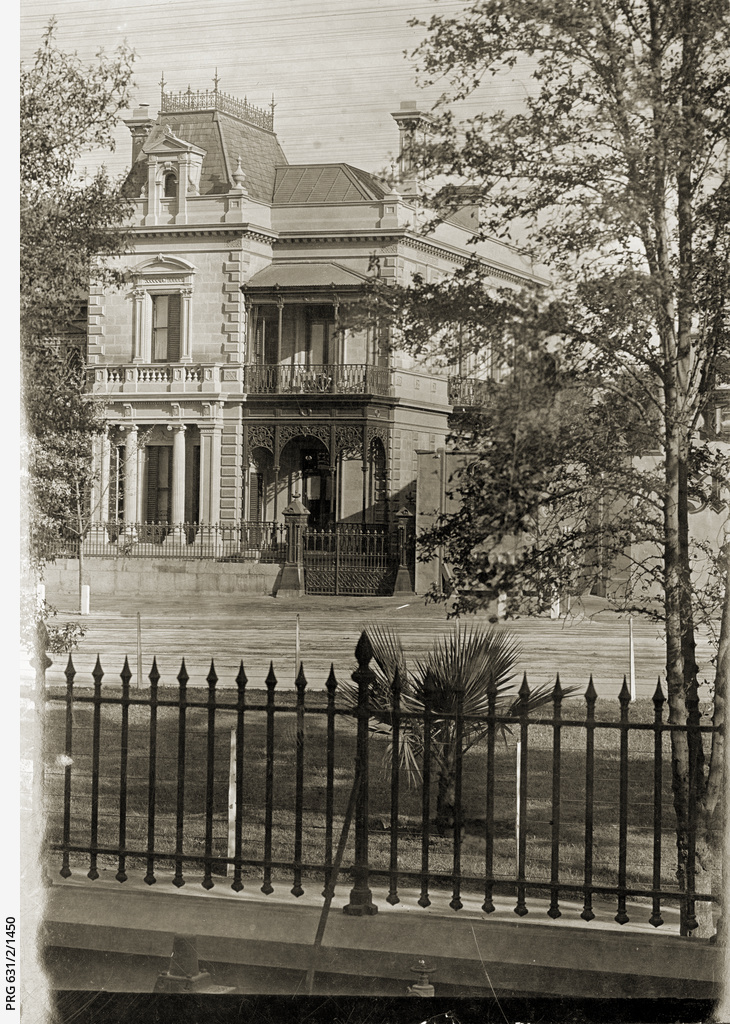
Italianate residence of Adelaide businessman and politician John Bagot in Adelaide, circa 1907

The Italianate style developed as a result of French painters who idealised the Italian landscape and turned it into their version of Arcadia. Their influence was long-lasting and eventually led to the Italianate architectural style of the 19th century. The style featured asymmetry and often, on grander residences, a tower of varying size. In Australia, the addition of a verandah, sometimes arcaded but later decorated with filigree cast iron, gave a regional flavour to the style.

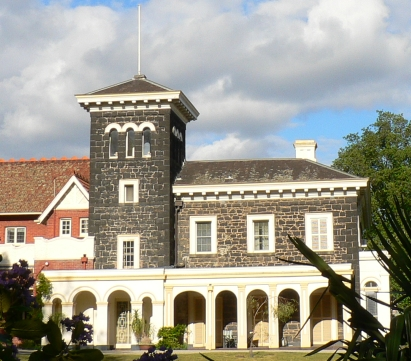
Bishopscourt, East Melbourne; completed 1853

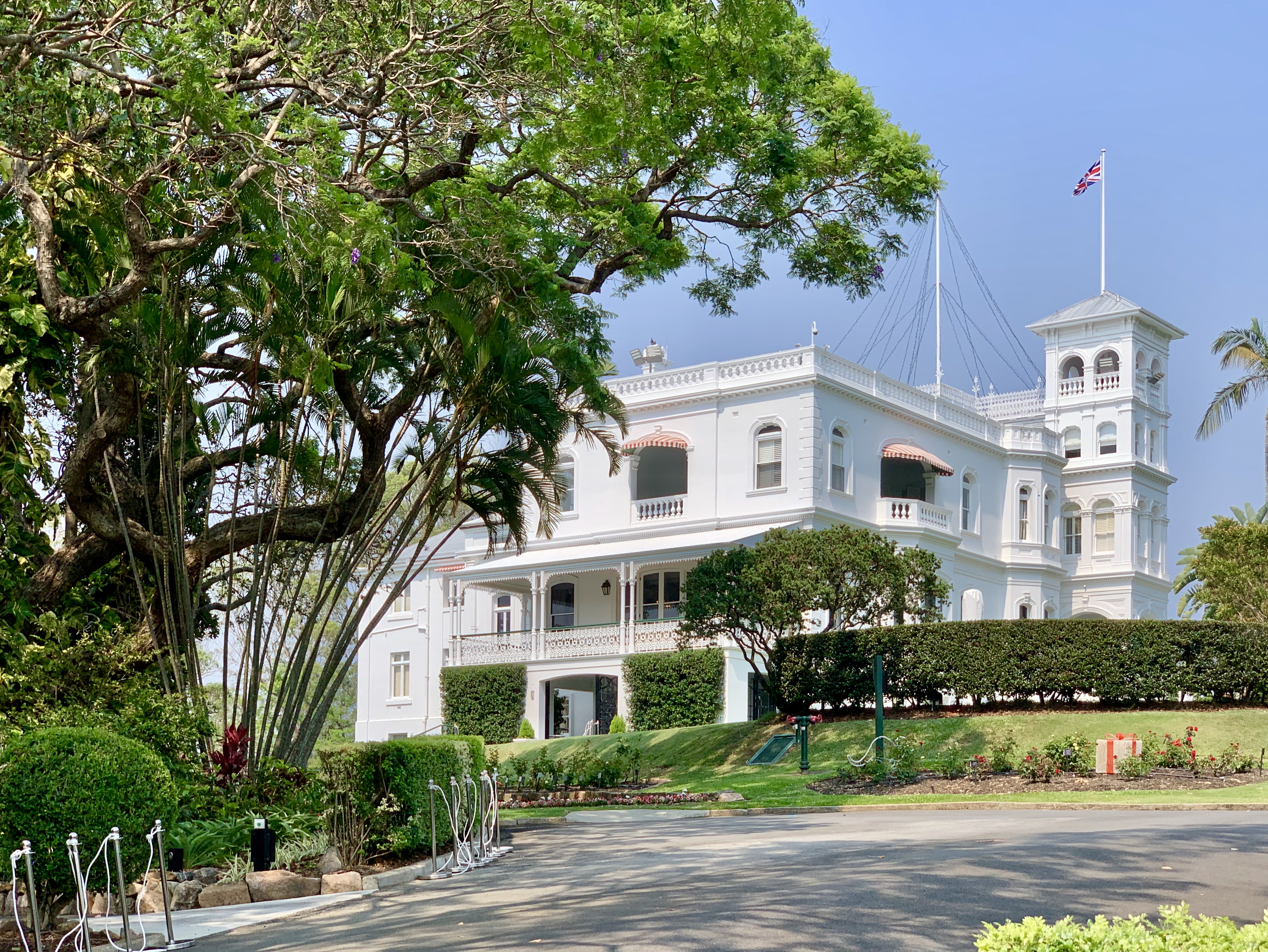
Government House, Brisbane; completed 1865

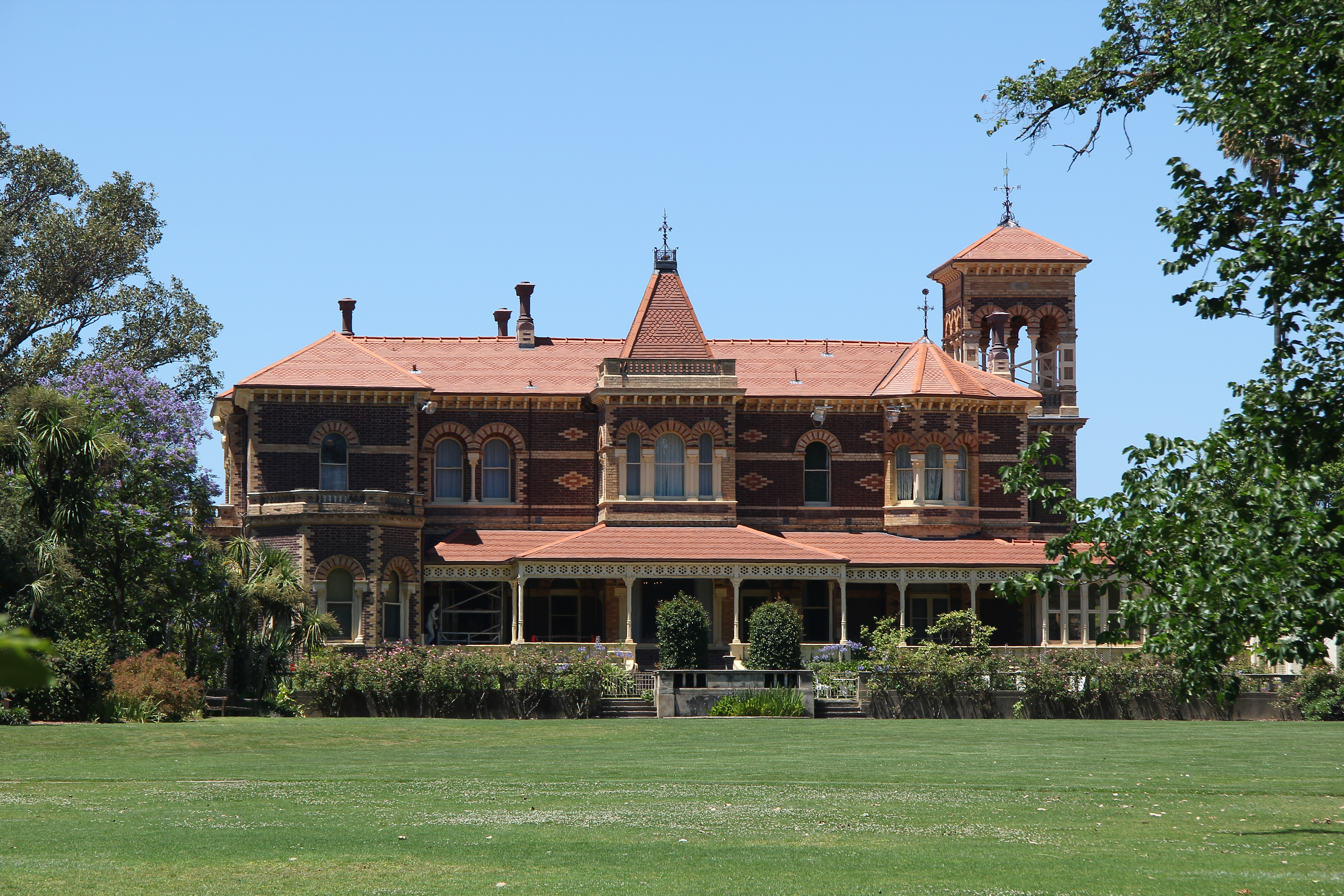
Rippon Lea, Elsternwick, Melbourne; Lombardic Romanesque version in polychromatic brick; completed 1868

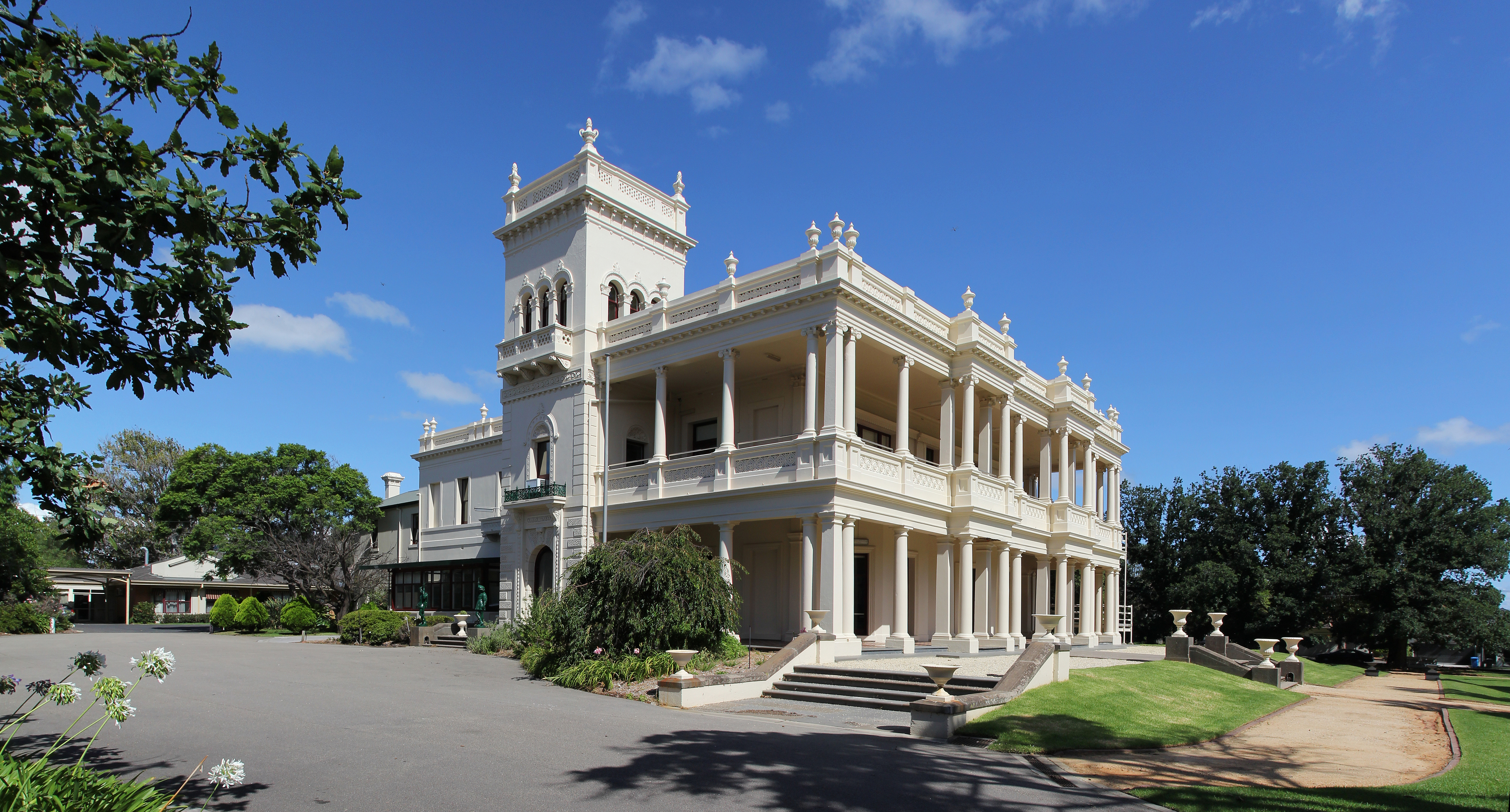
Kamesburgh, Brighton, Melbourne; completed 1874

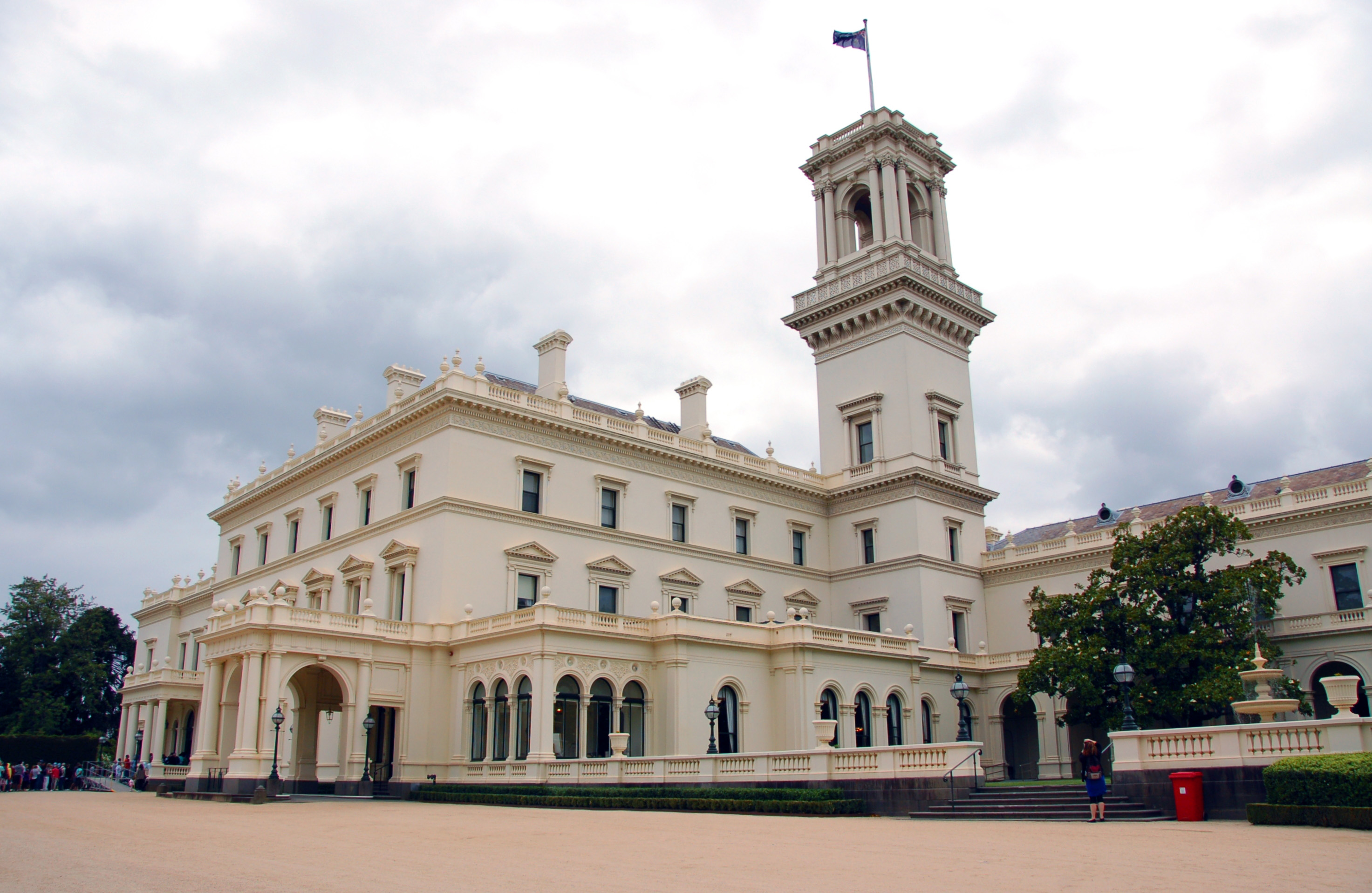
Government House, Melbourne; completed in 1876

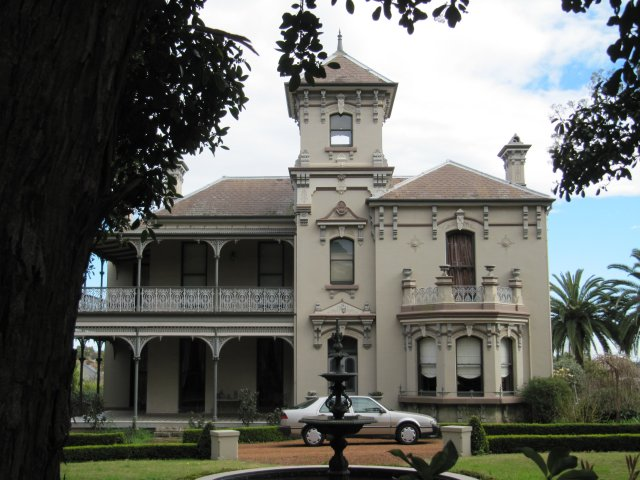
The Priory, Burwood, Sydney; completed 1877

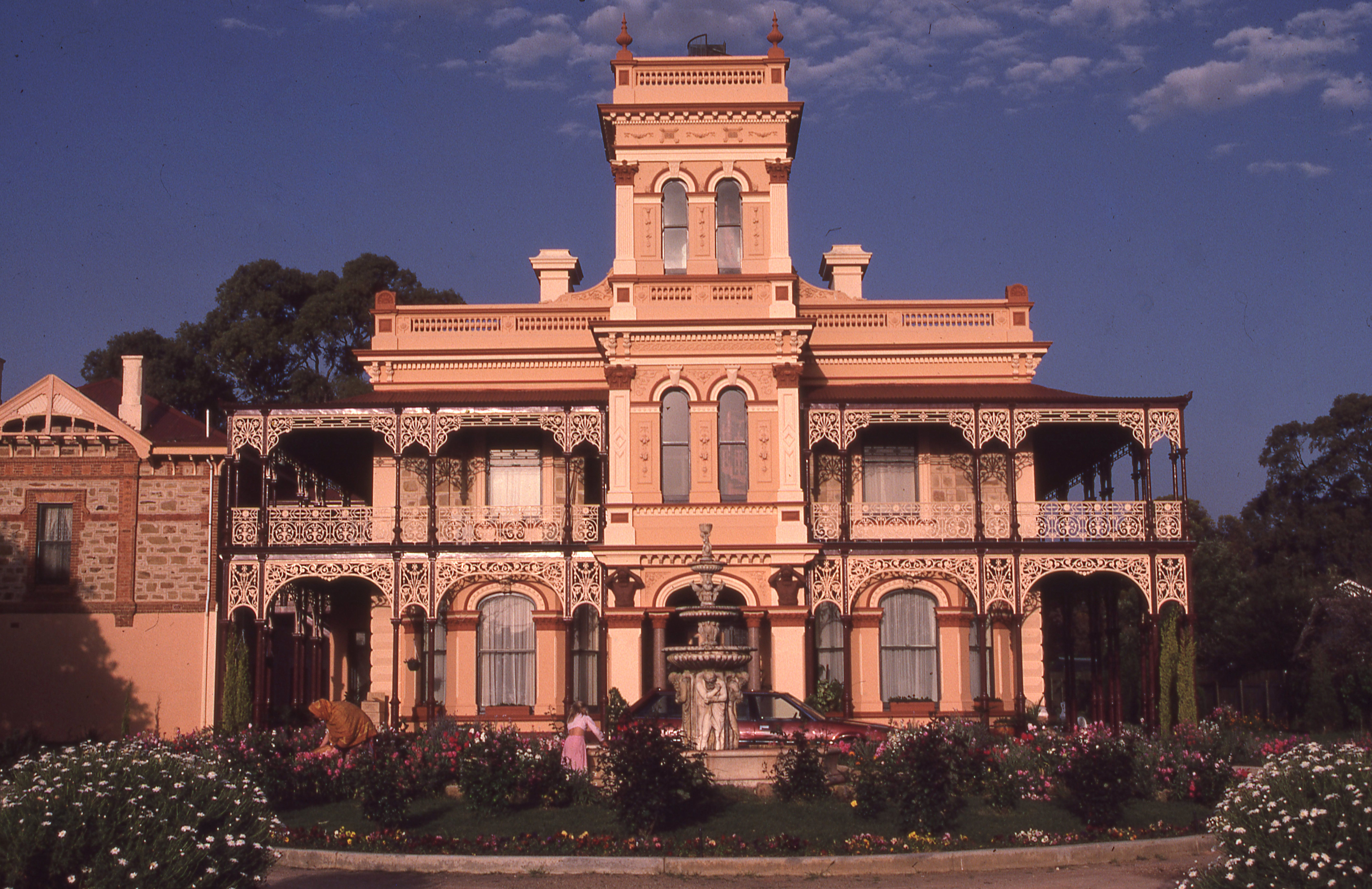
Eynesbury House, Kingswood, Adelaide; completed 1881

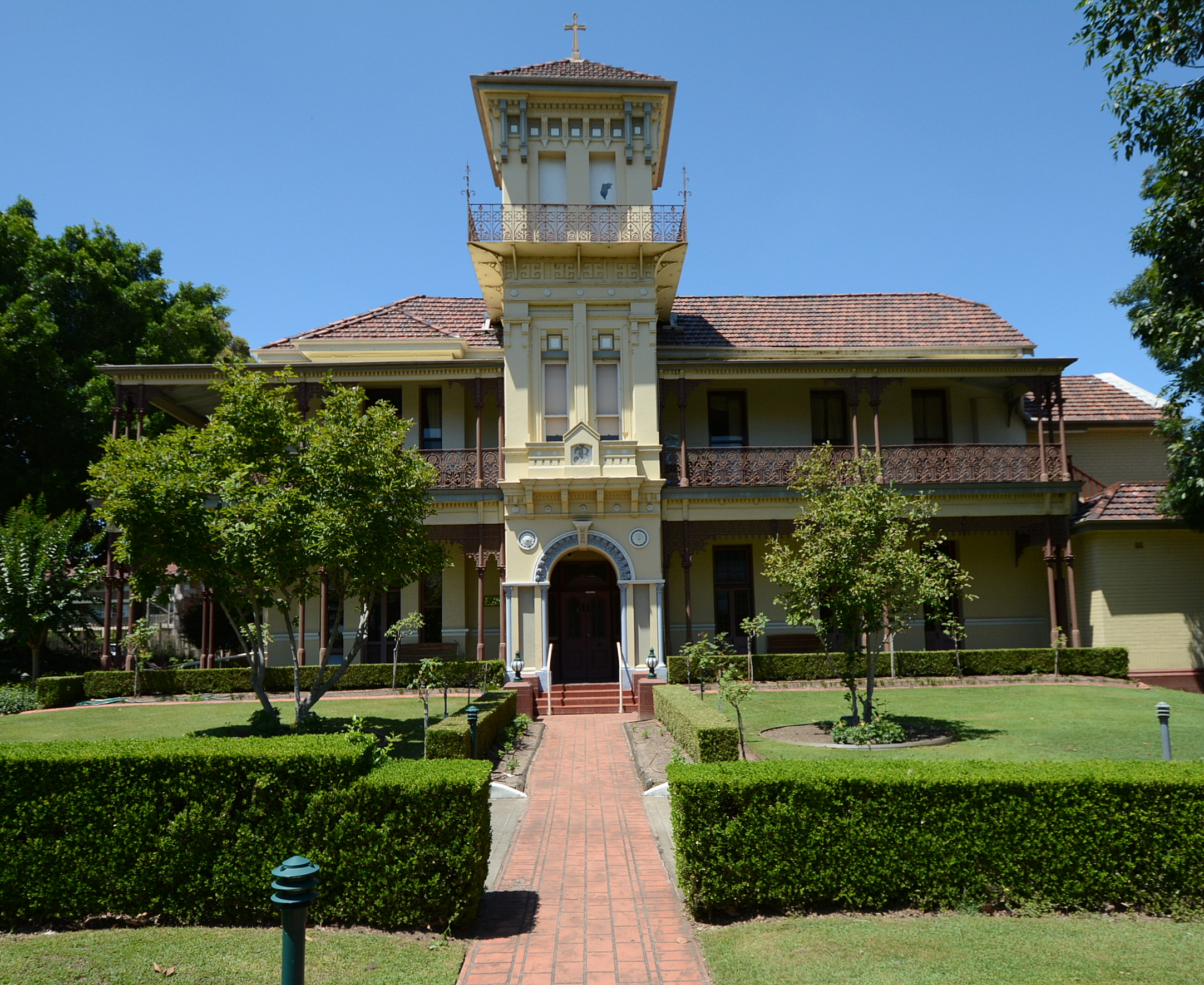
Duncraggan Hall, Auburn, Sydney; completed c. 1884

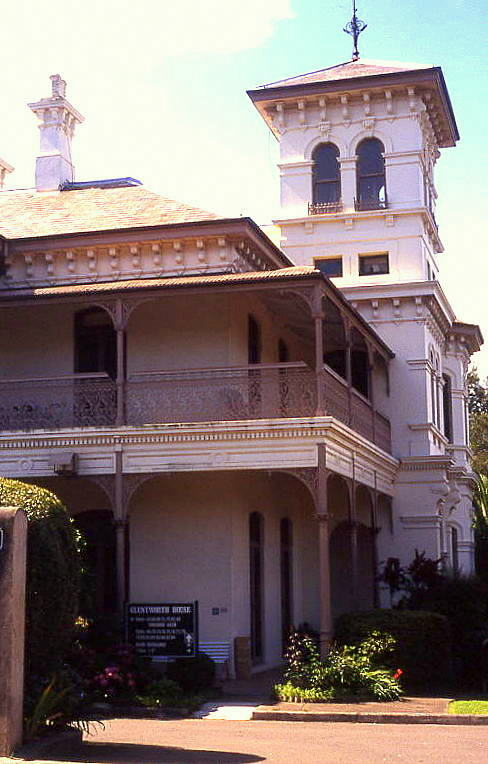
Glentworth, Ashfield, Sydney; completed c. 1886

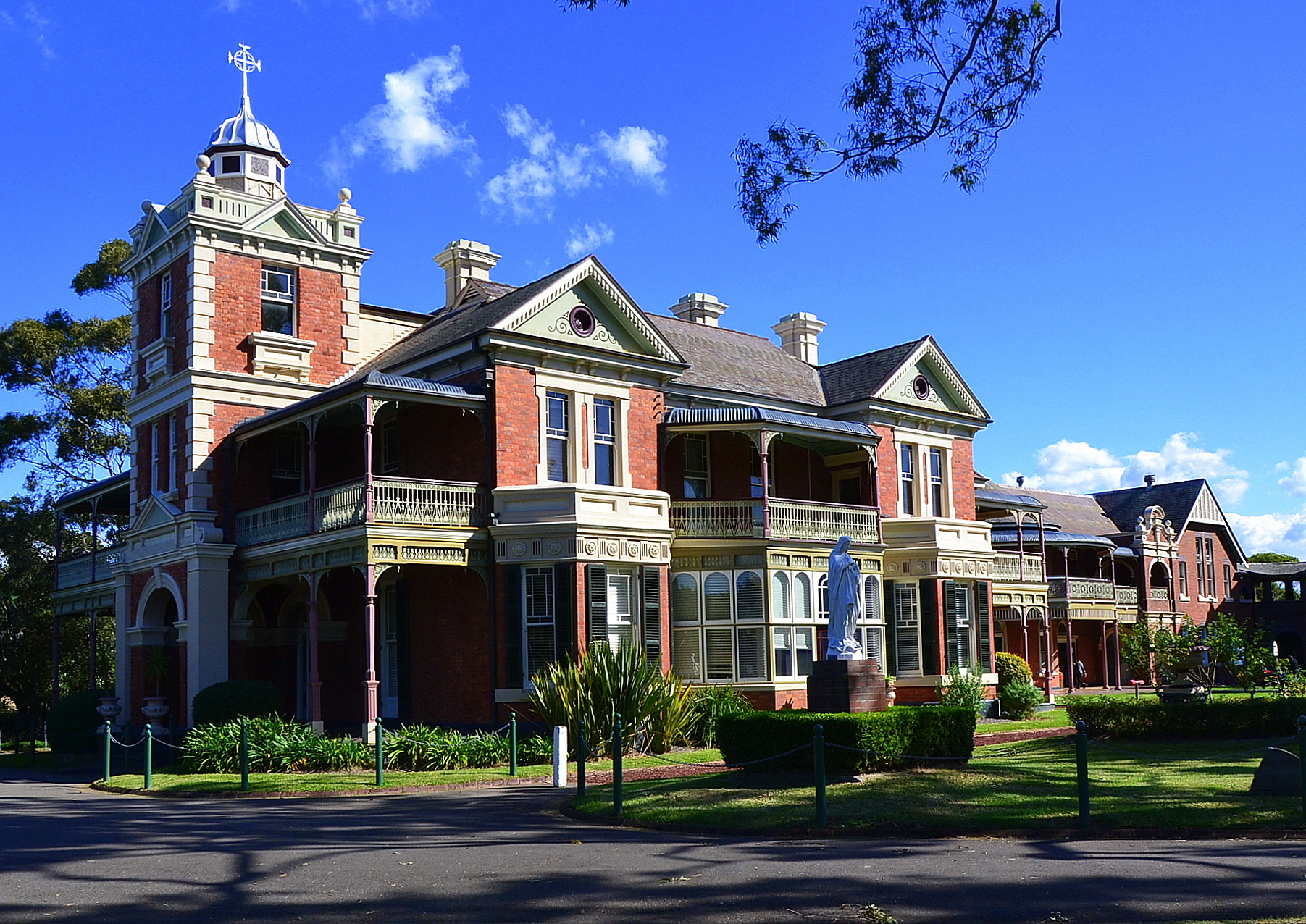
Mount Royal Villa, Strathfield, Sydney; completed 1887

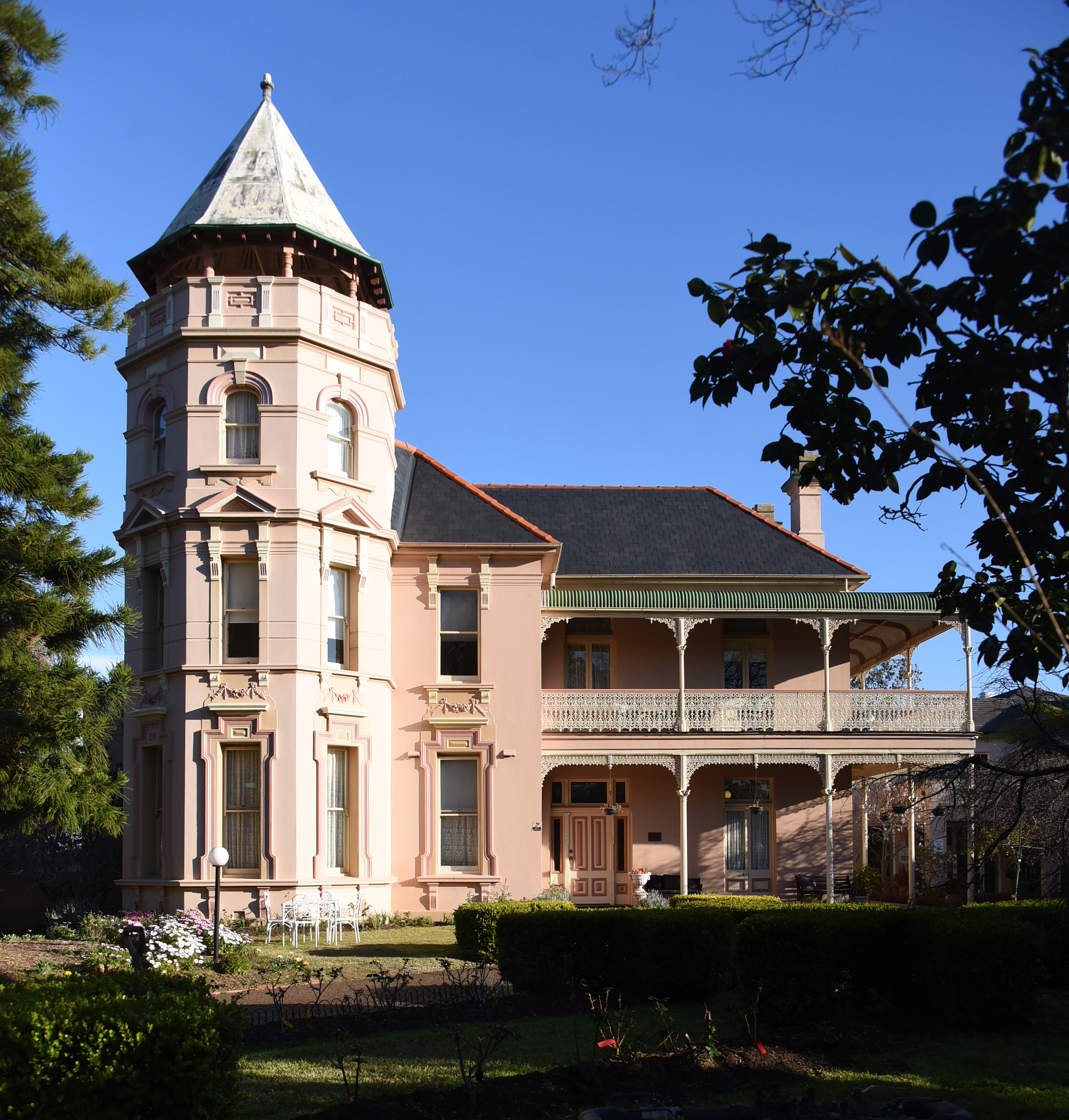
Windsor Gardens, Chatswood, Sydney; completed 1888

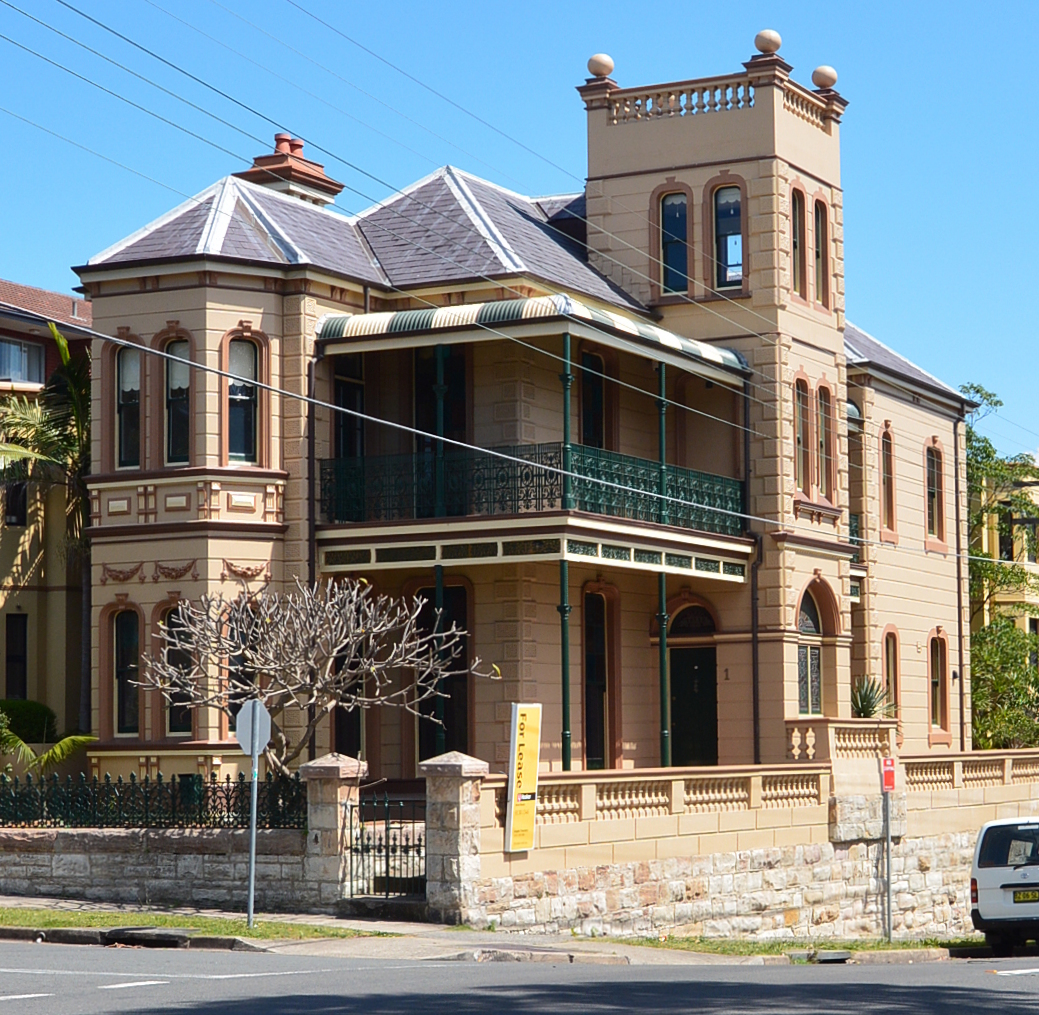
Tayar, Randwick, Sydney; completed in the 1890s

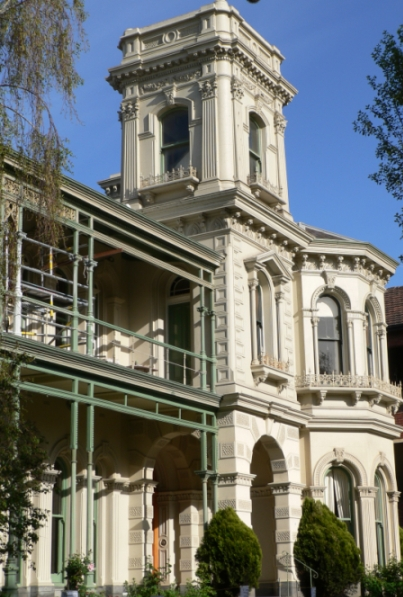
Myrnong Hall, St Kilda, Melbourne; completed c. 1890

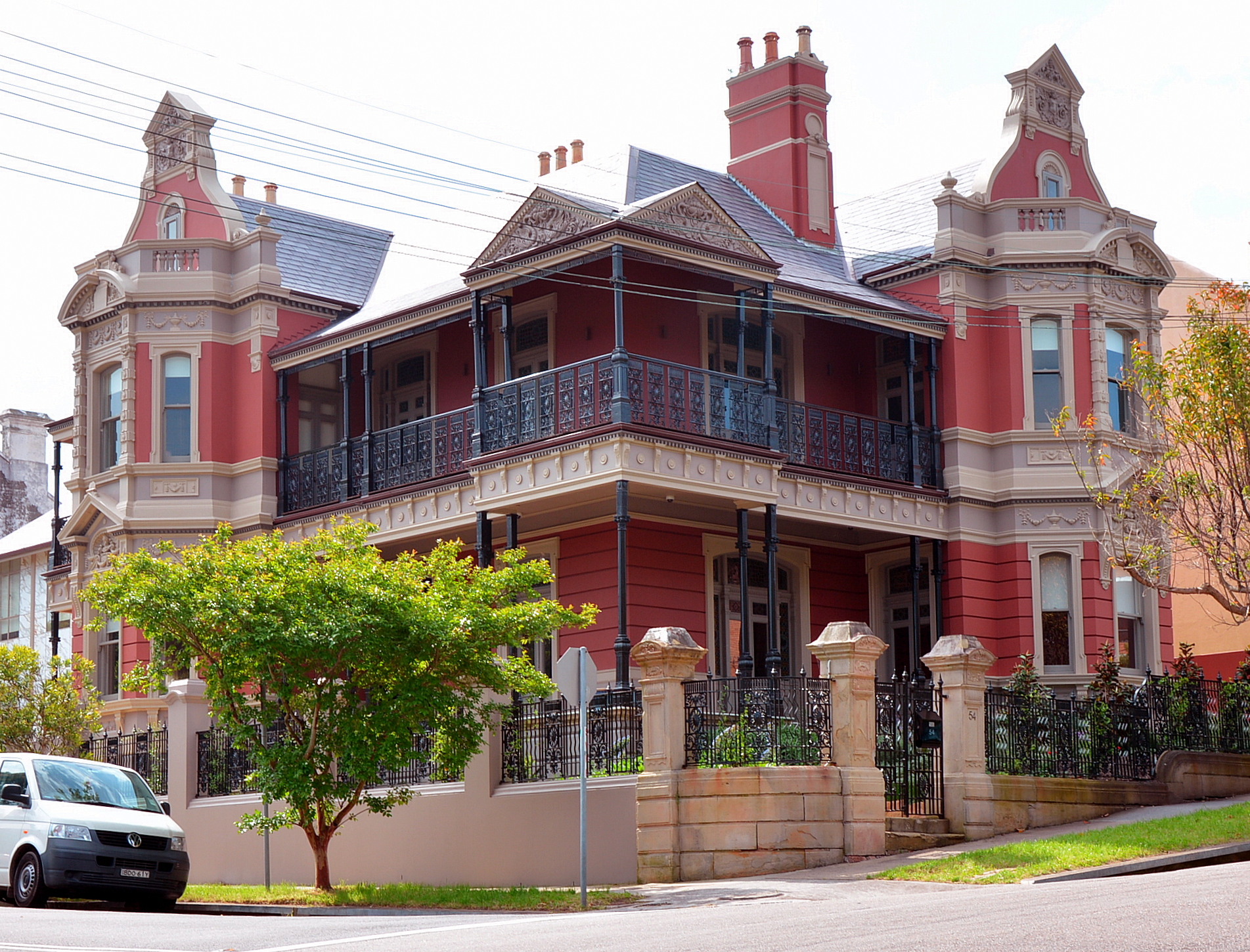
Earlswood, Randwick, Sydney; 'Boom style'; completed 1891

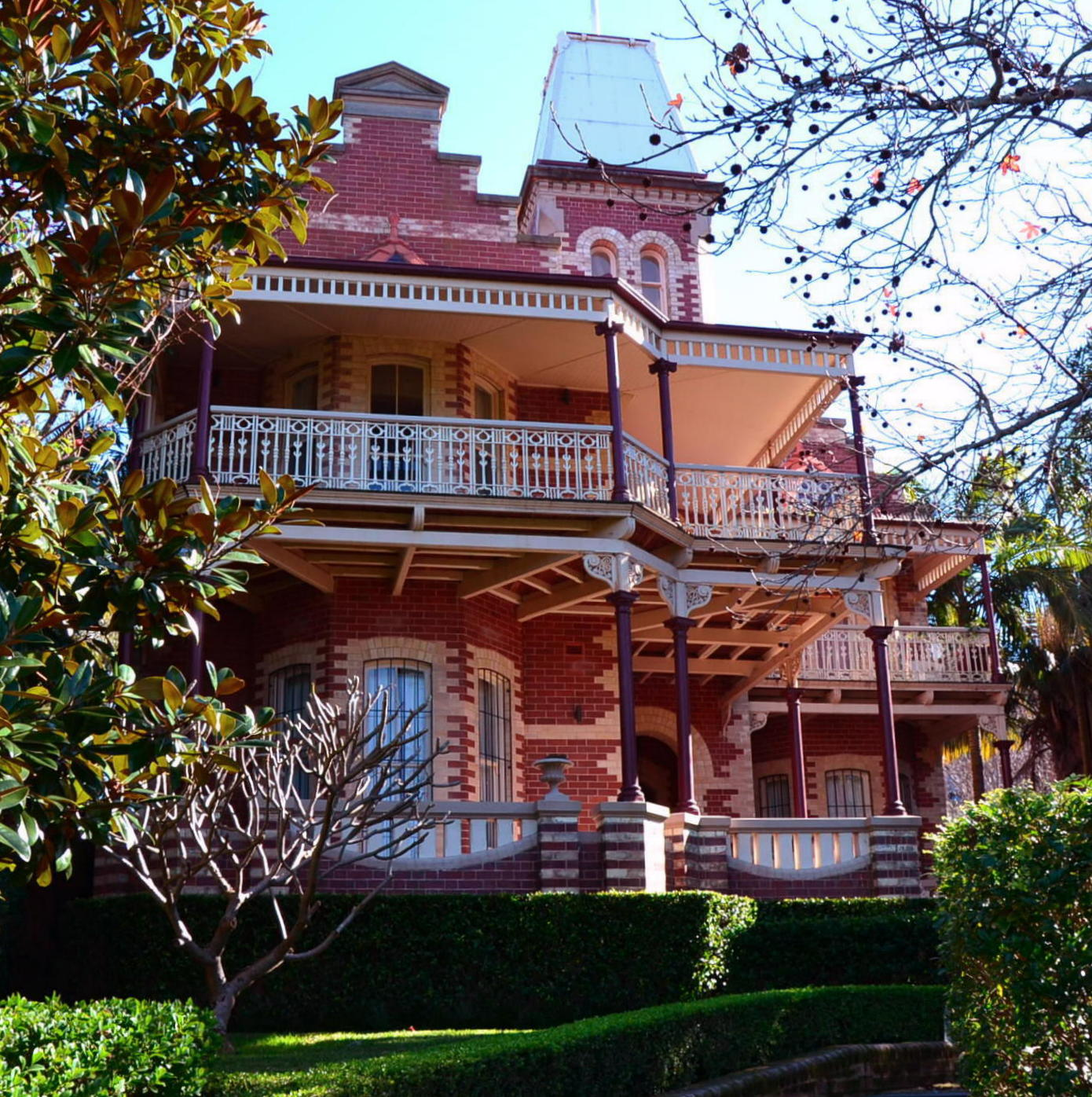
Walshome, Centennial Park, Sydney

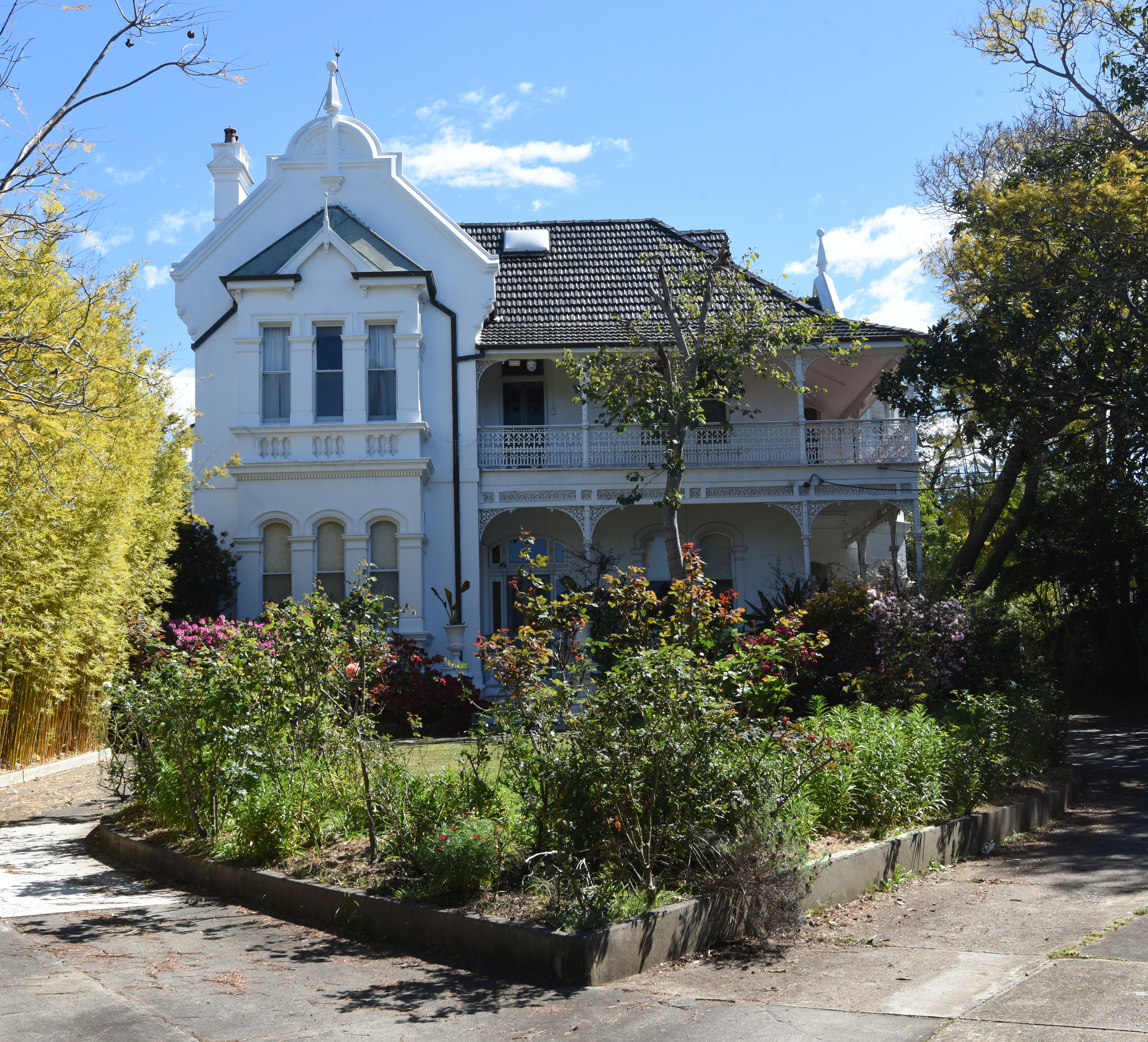
House in Strathfield, Sydney

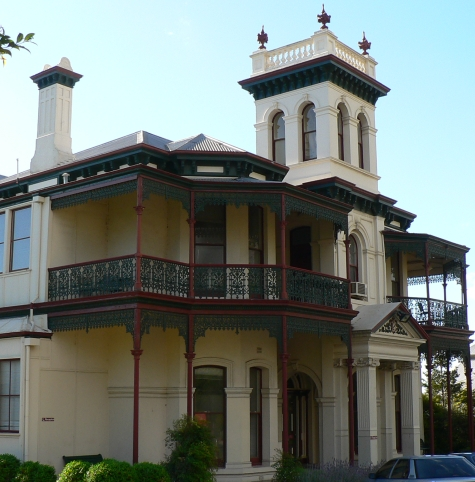
Epworth, Richmond, Melbourne

==== Victorian Second Empire ====
The Second Empire style was preferred for grander mansions. For the rich, particularly in the wealthier parts of the larger metropolitan areas, the style evoked images of French aristocracy. Although rare, examples can be found in the bigger cities. Distinctive features include towers, quoining, mansard and slate roofs, square domes dormer windows, iron cresting and rich classical details. In the Australian setting, domestic interpretations of the style often combined filigree elements such as cast iron verandahs.

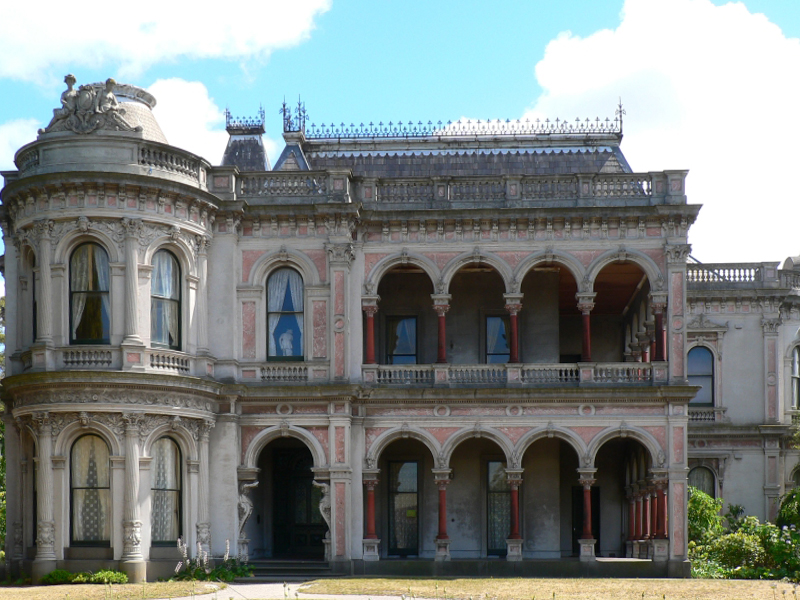
Labassa, Manor Grove, Caulfield North

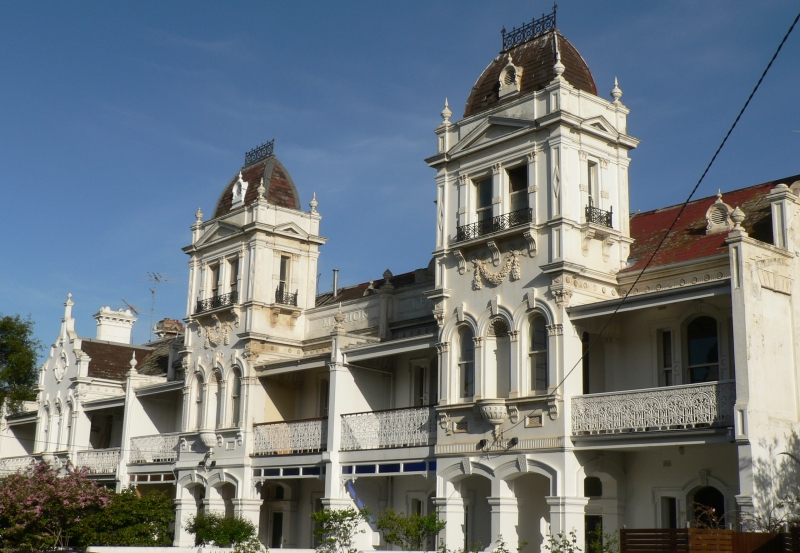
Marion Terrace, Burnett Street, St Kilda

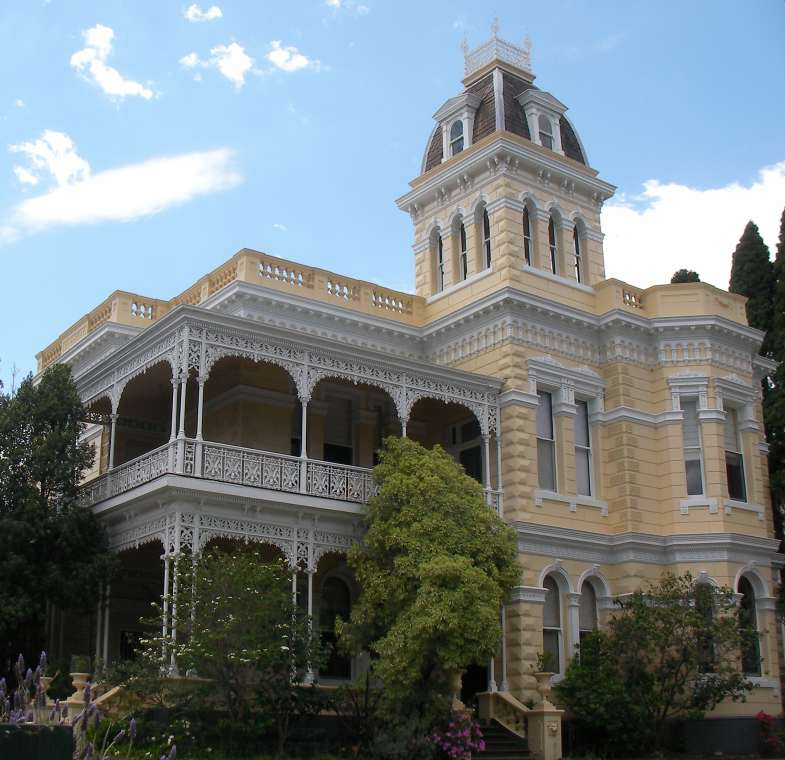
Goodrest, Cnr Leopold and Toorak Roads, South Yarra

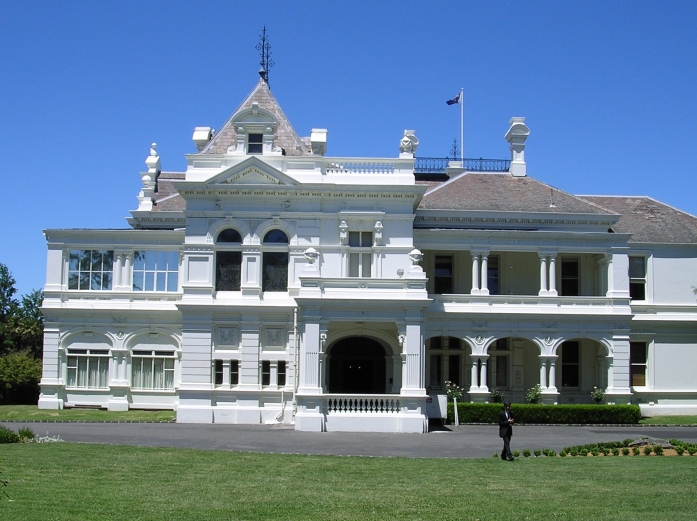
Stonington, Glenferrie Road, Malvern

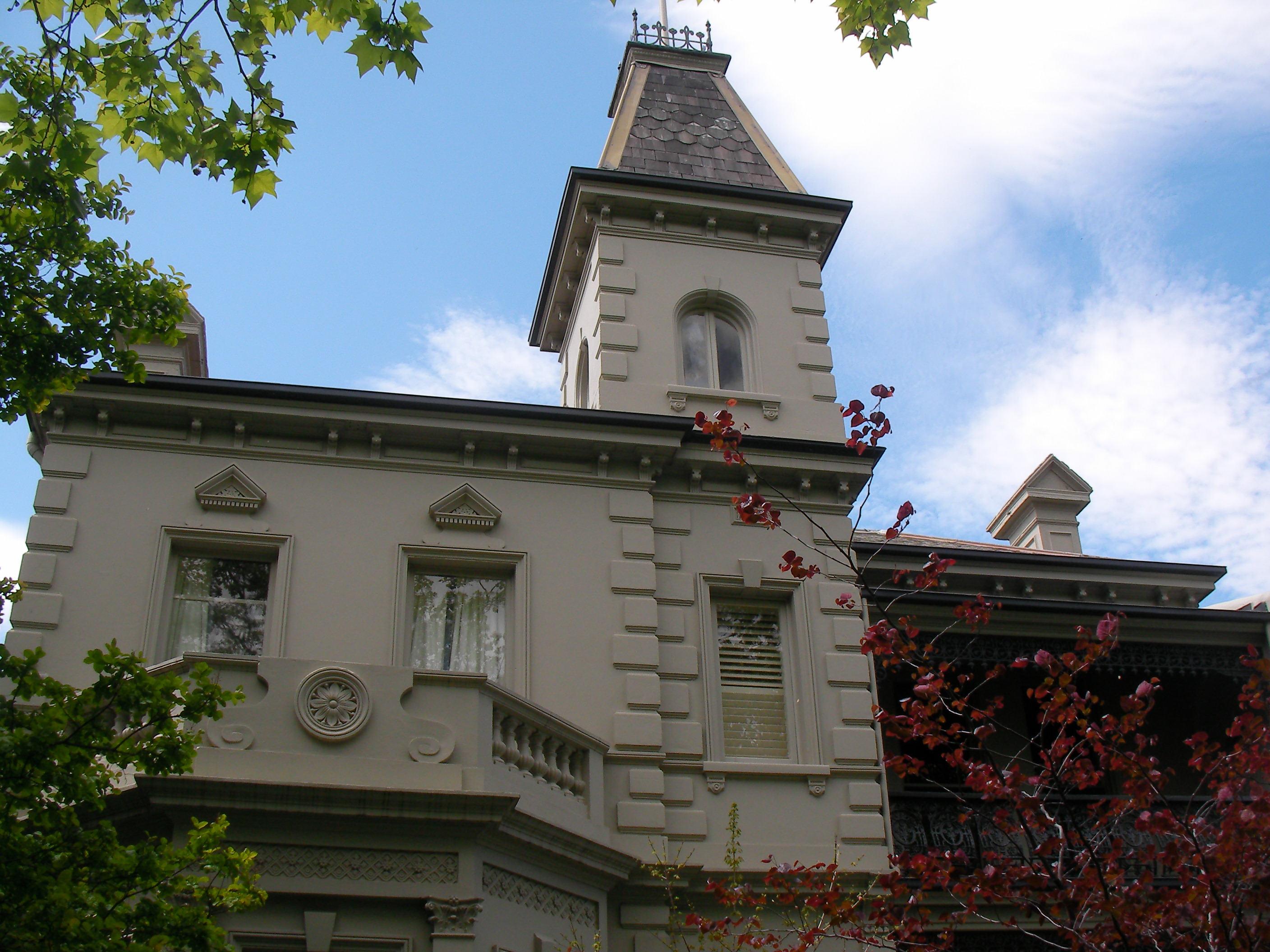
House, Pasley Street, South Yarra

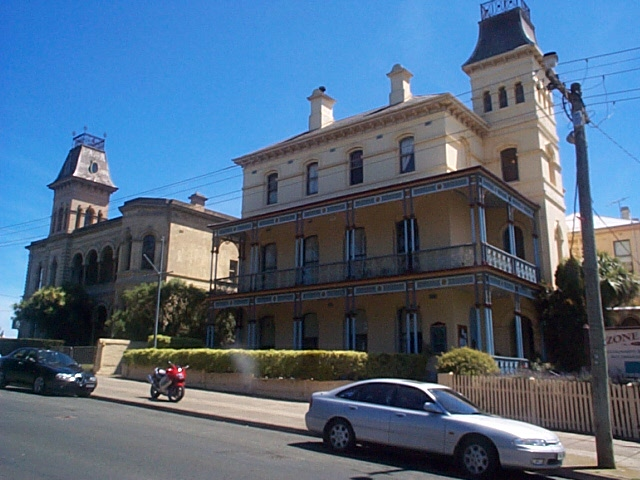
Seaside apartments, Queenscliff

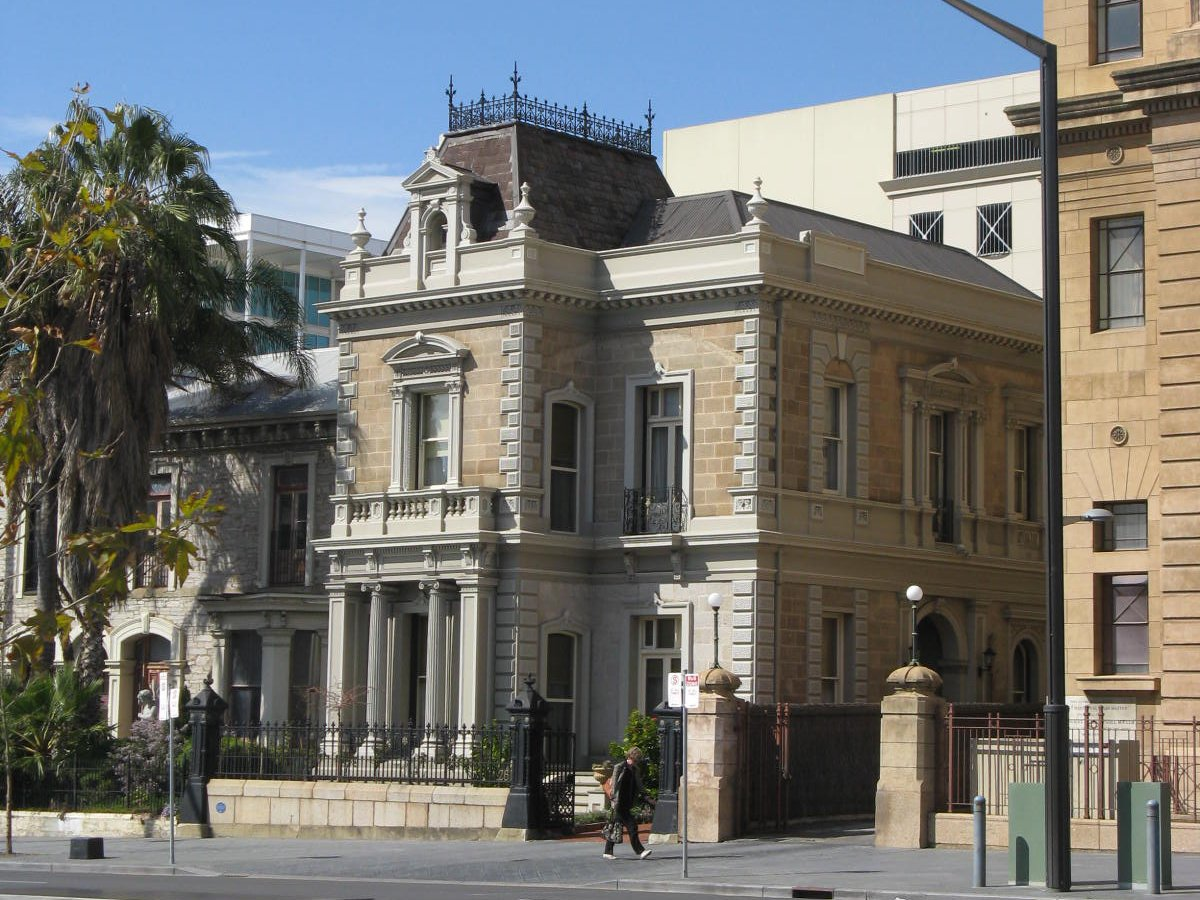
Waterhouse House, Adelaide.

==== Victorian Filigree ====
As housing developed in Australia, verandahs became important as a way of shading the house. From the mid-19th century in particular, as people became more affluent, they built more elaborate homes, and one of the favoured elaborations was the filigree, or screen, of cast iron or wrought iron, or timber fretwork. This developed to the point where it has become one of the major features of Australian architecture. Many homes with this feature are also considered Italianate architecture, the filigree element being the cast iron balcony.

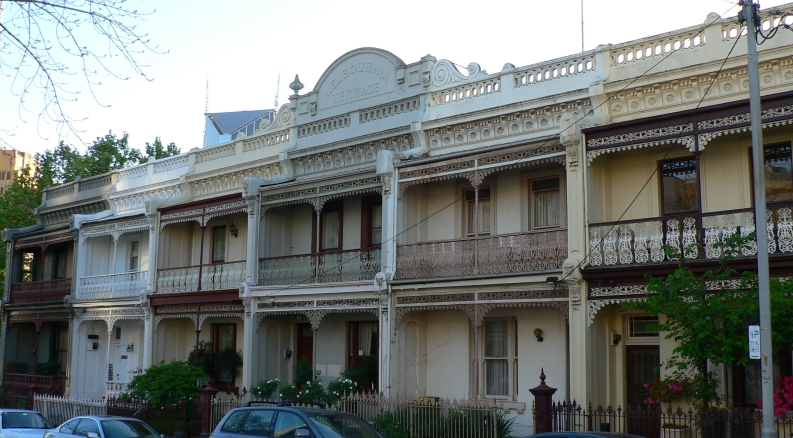
Melbournia Terrace, Carlton. Completed in 1877.

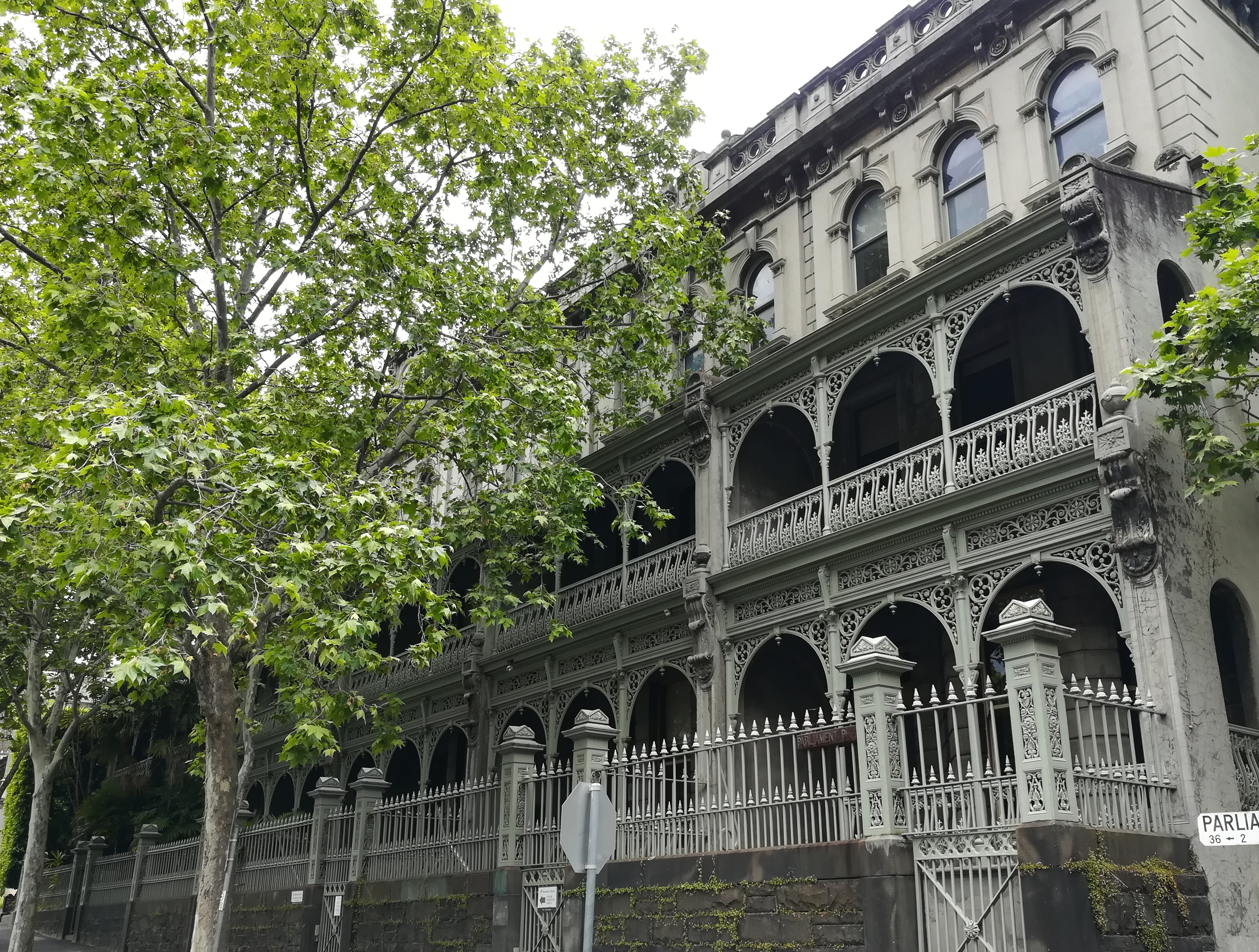
Tasma Terrace, East Melbourne. Victorian Free Classical terrace with filigree verandahs; completed 1879. The headquarters of the National Trust (Victoria).

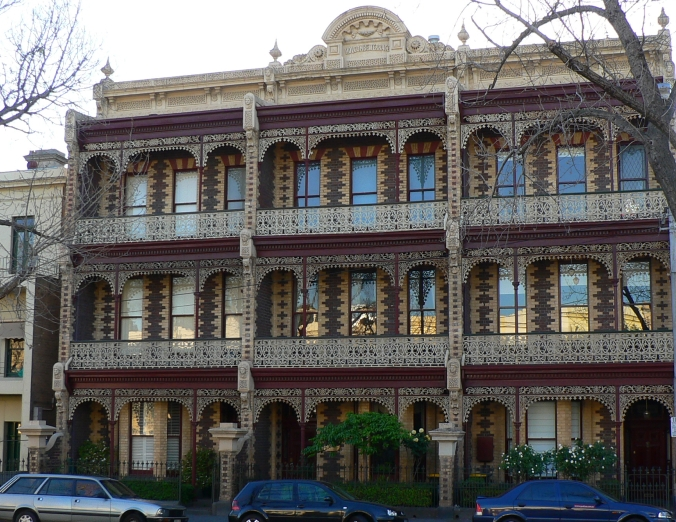
Holcombe Terrace, Carlton; completed 1884. One of Australia's best examples of the residential filigree style executed in polychrome brick.

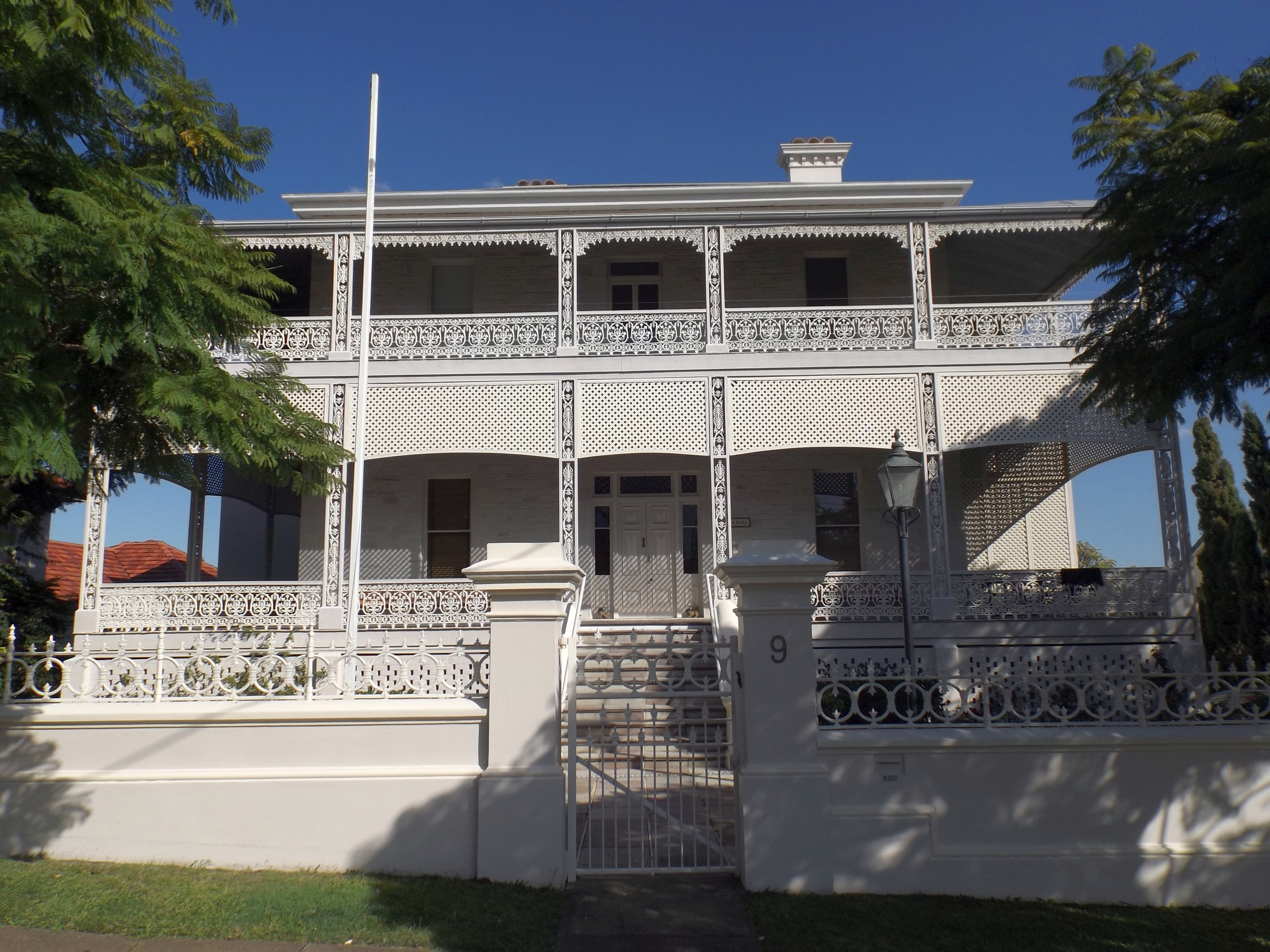
Palma Rosa, Hamilton, Queensland. Andrea Stombuco, architect; completed 1887.

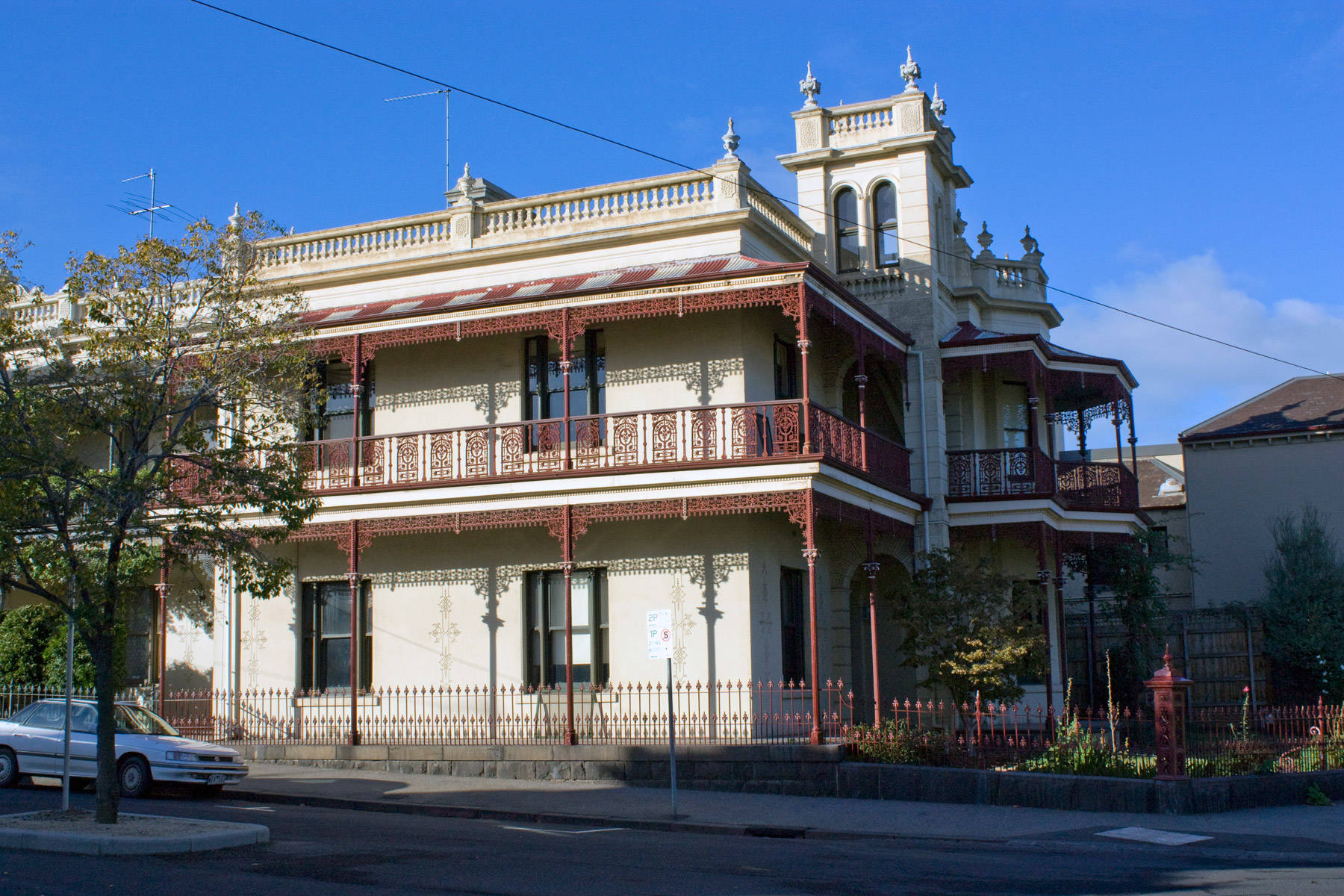
Wardlow, Parkville, Melbourne; built 1888. Italianate mansion with canted verandah screens.

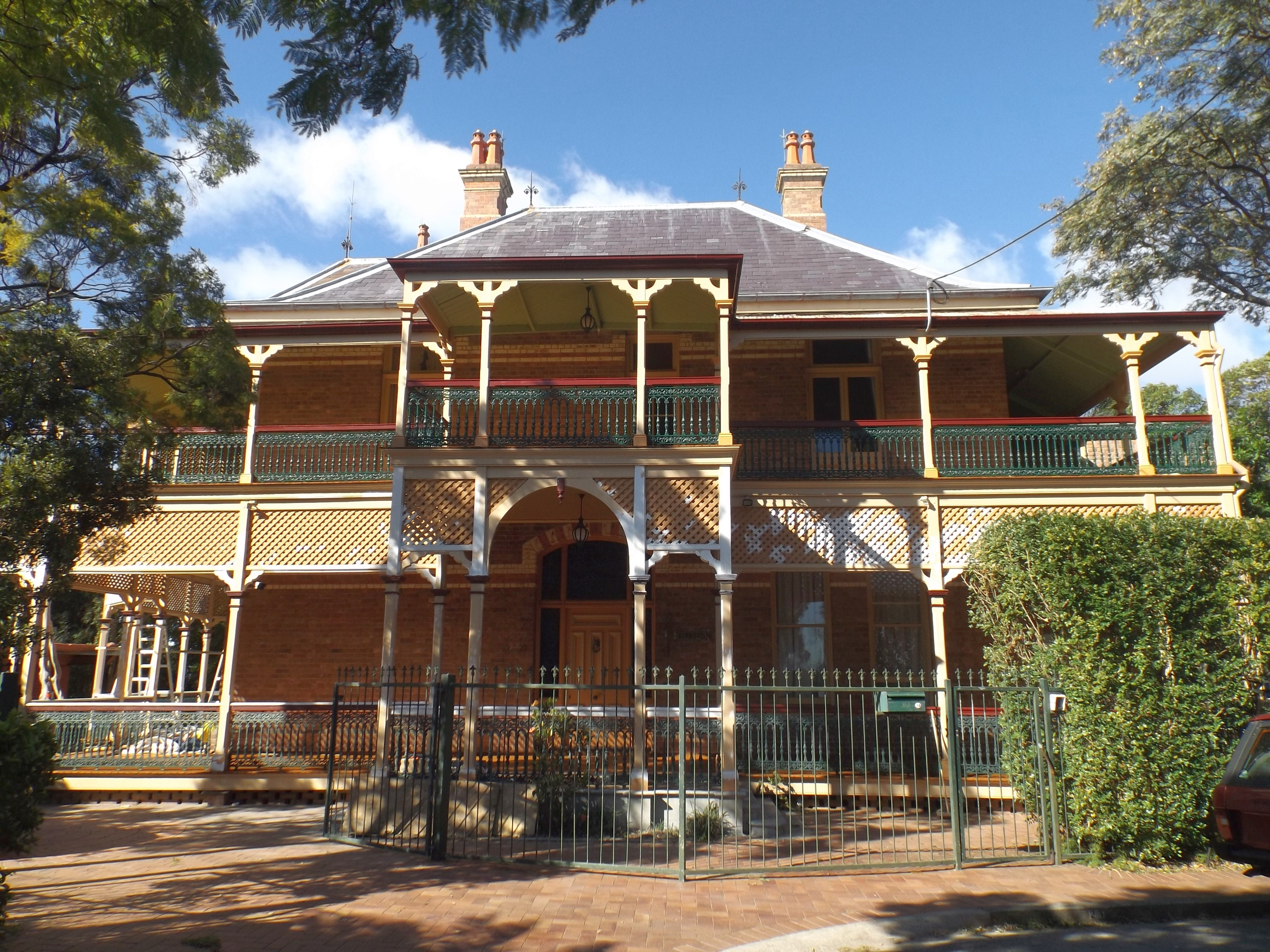
Kirkston, Windsor; completed 1889.

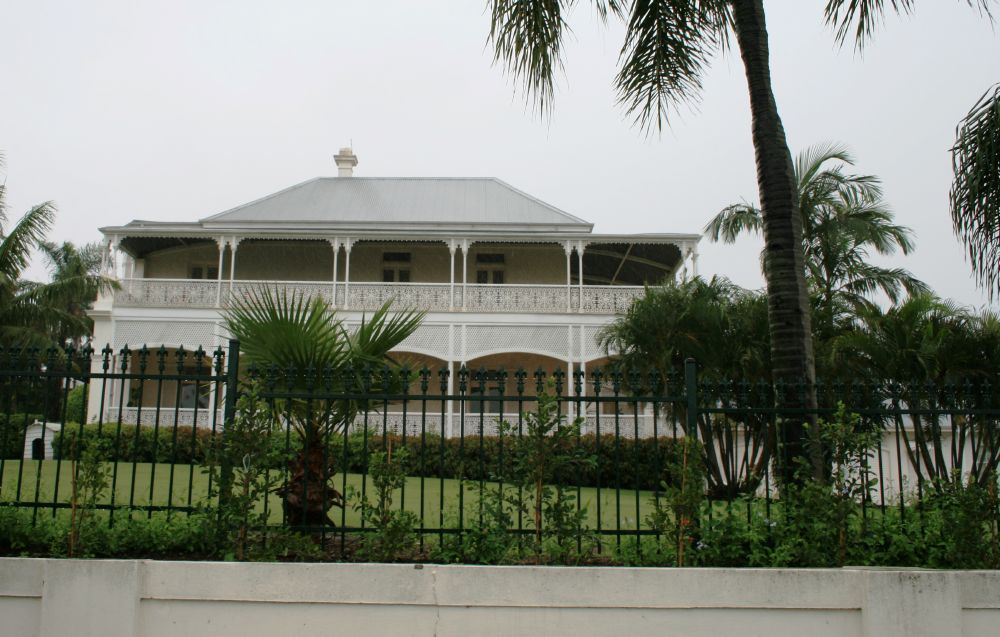
Cintra House, Bowen Hills (1863 remodelled 1890)

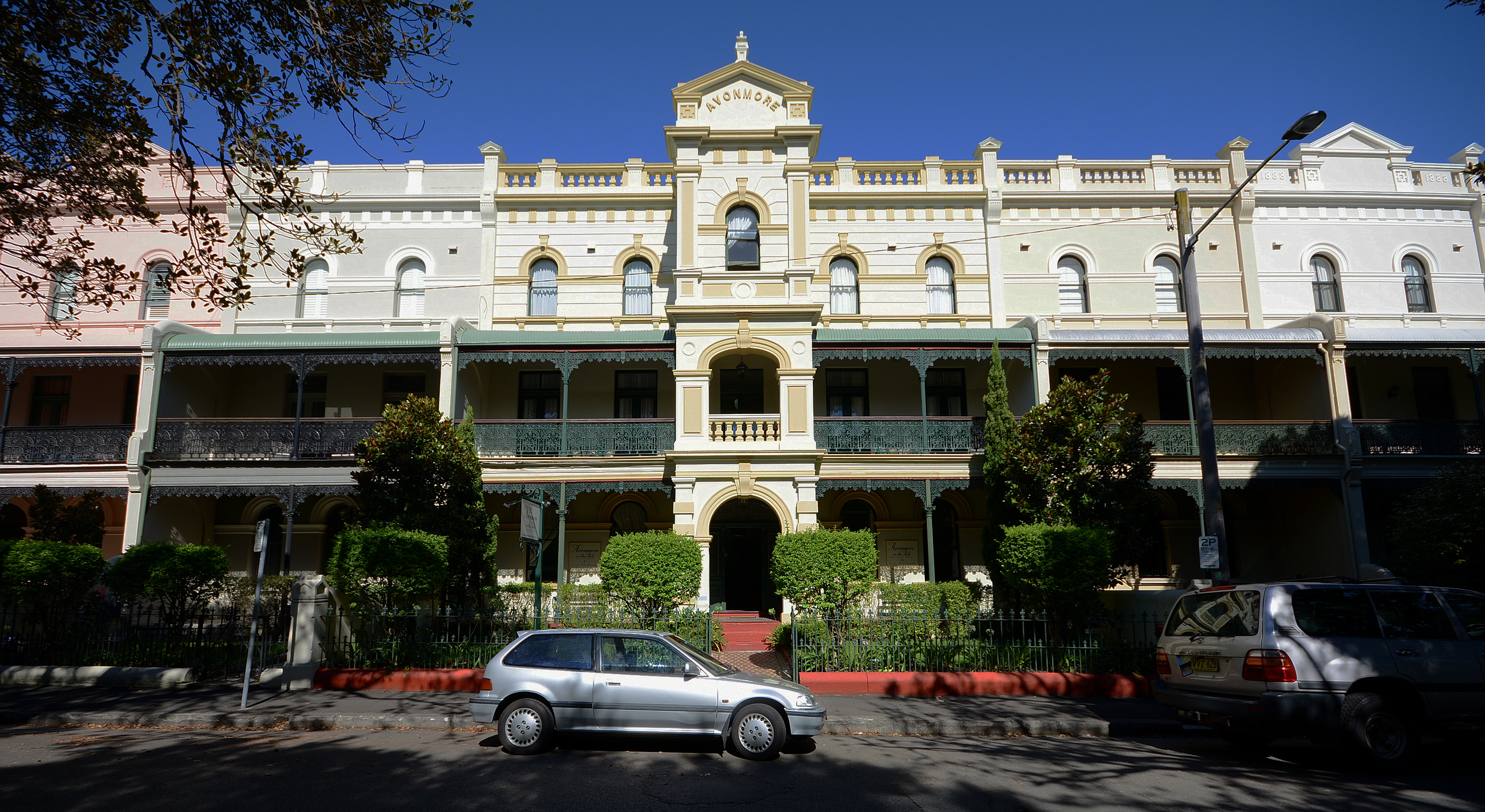
Avonmore Terrace, Randwick. Completed 1891.

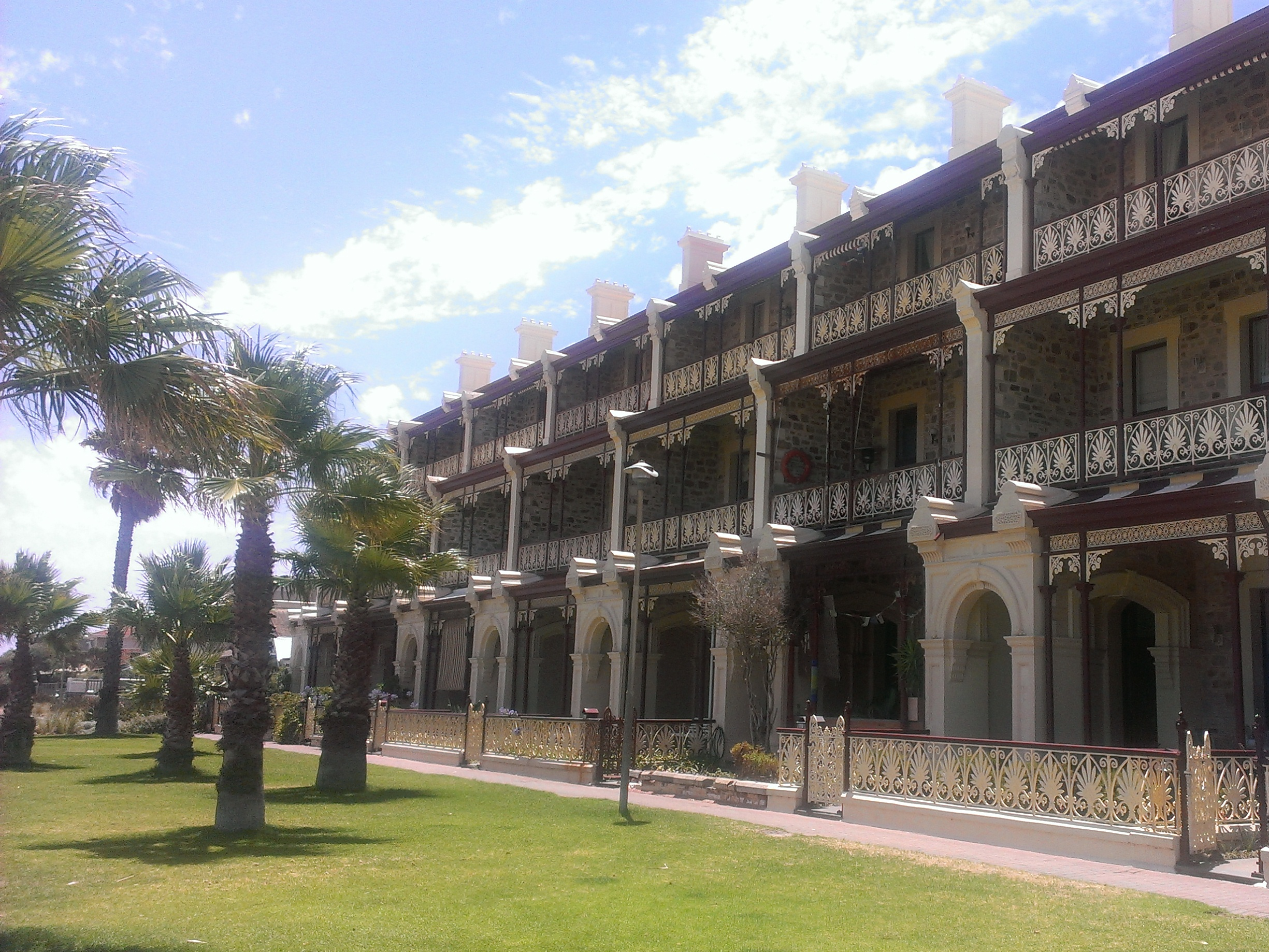
Marine Terraces, Grange Beach (1884). A key example of the Adelaide-style, with three storeys of setback filigree verandahs.

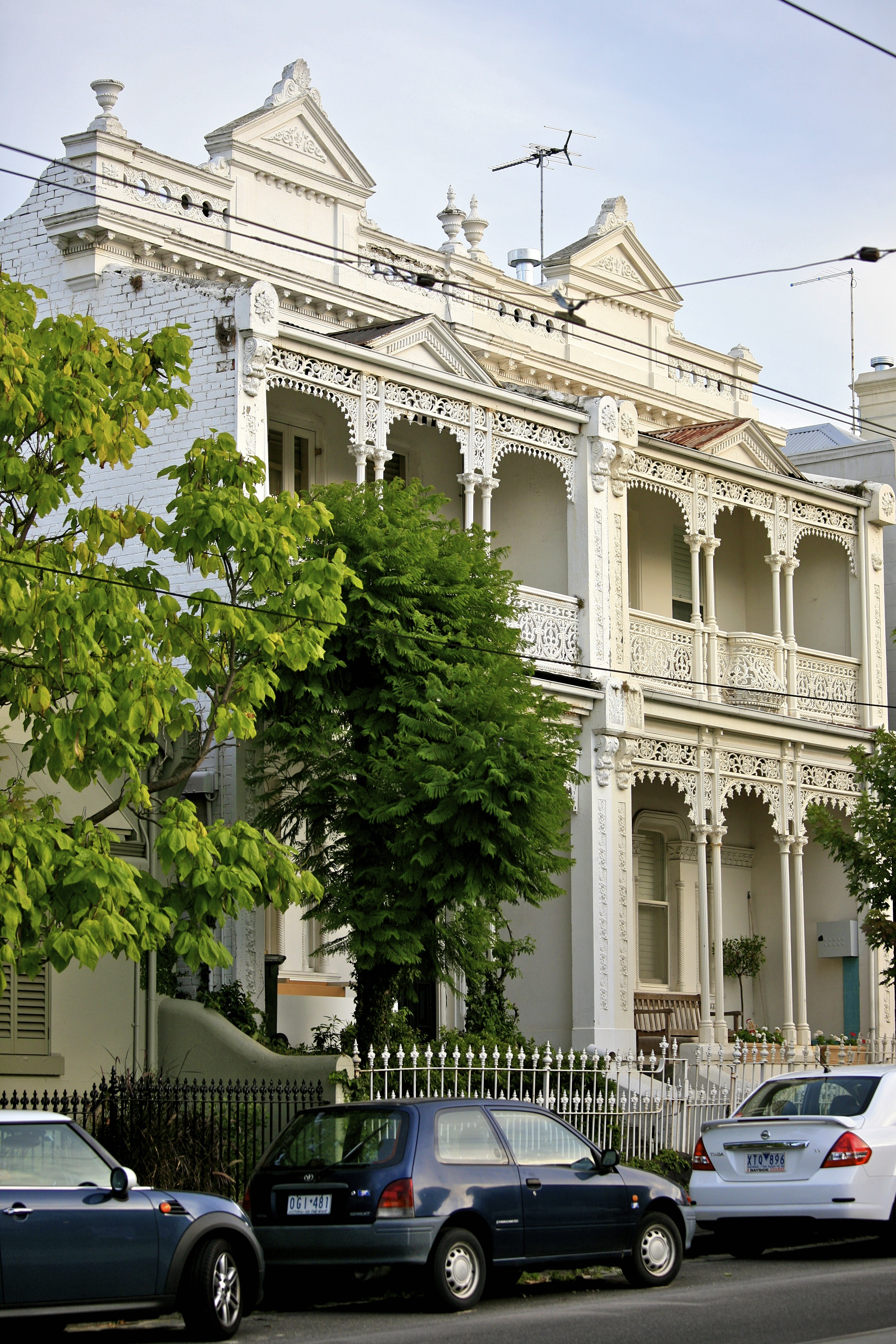
Terrace pair, South Yarra (1890–91) with specially cast "opera-box" balconies.

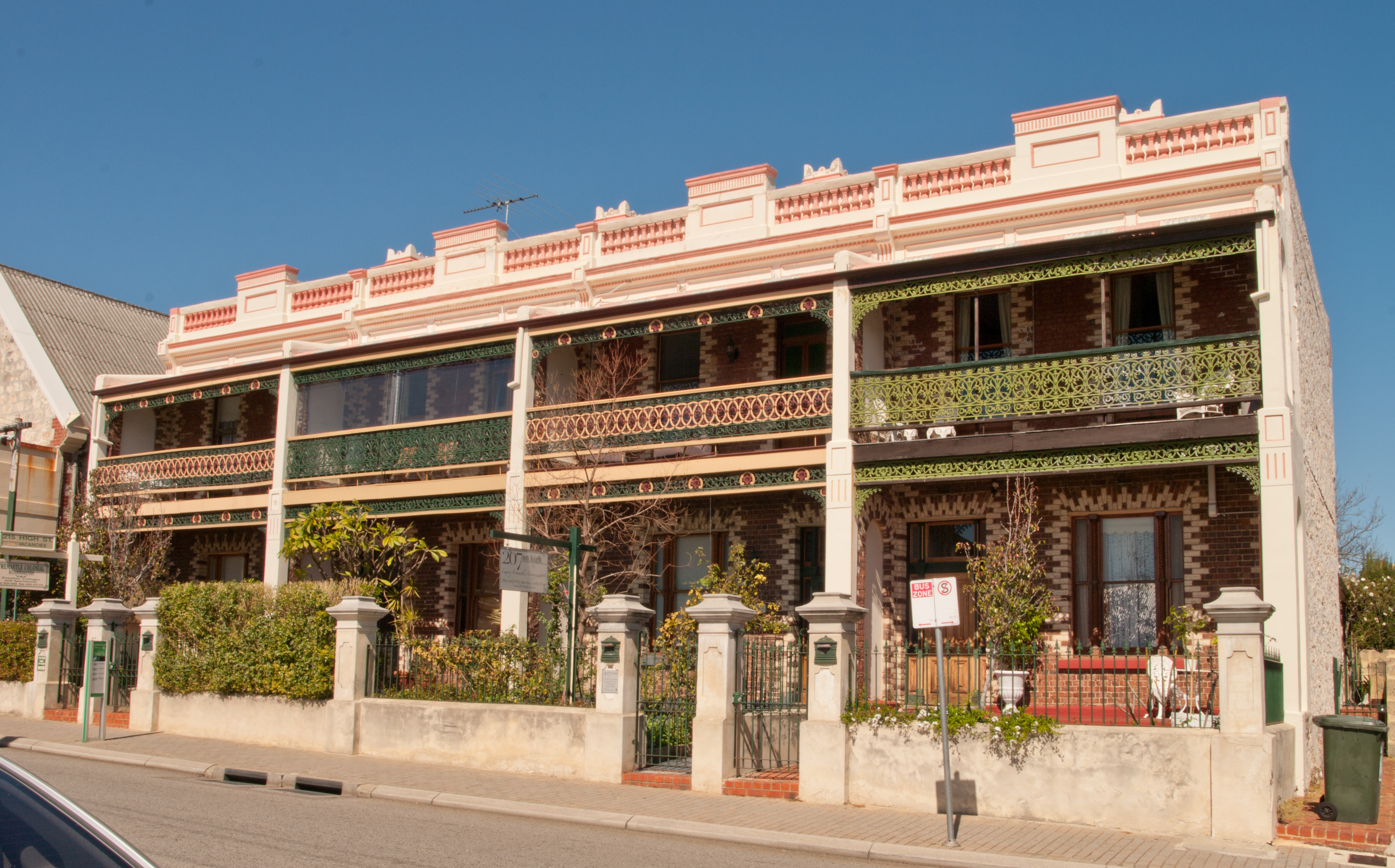
Ardmore Terraces, Fremantle built c.1898.

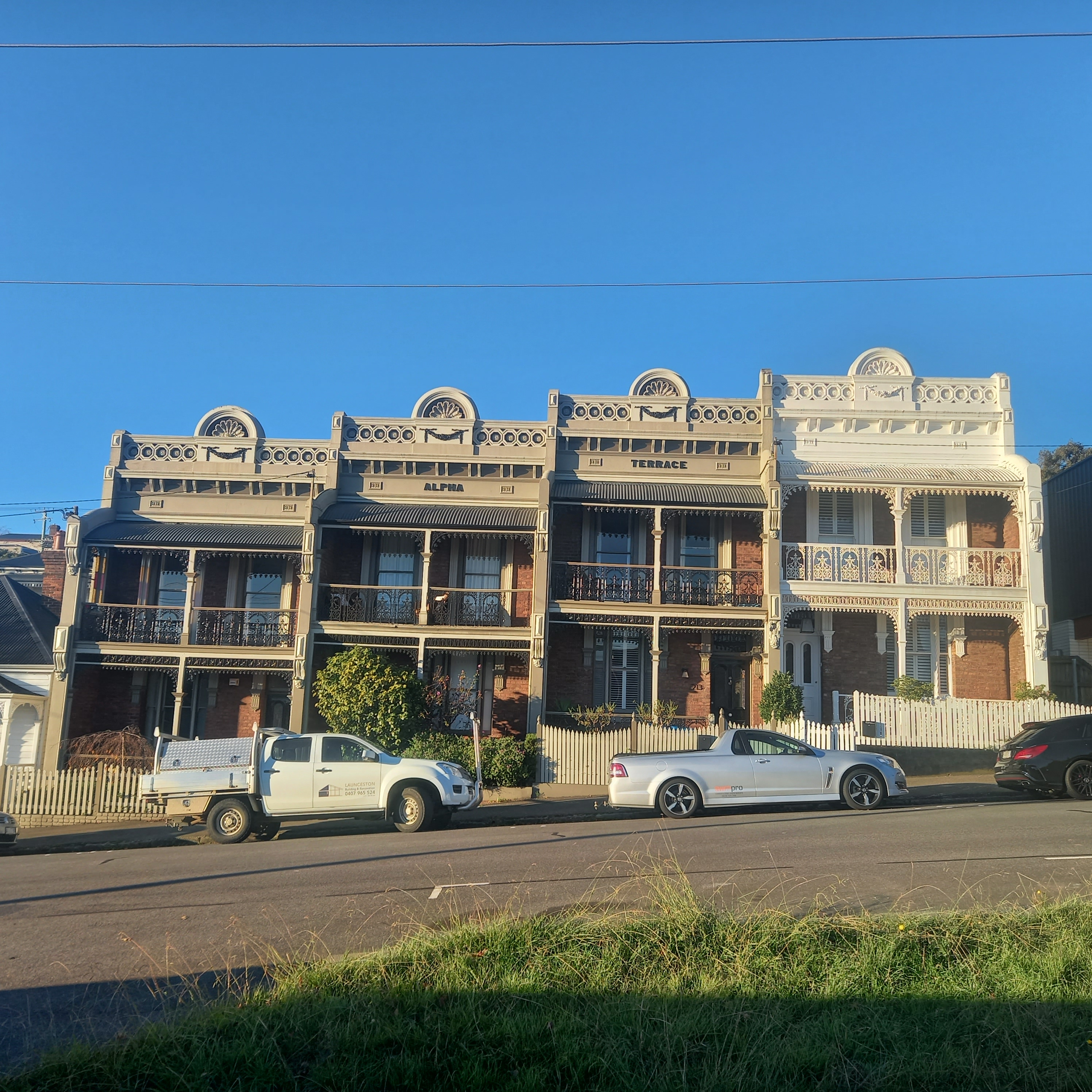
Alpha Terrace, Launceston (late-1880s).

==== Queenslander style ====
The Queenslander style house is characterized by an all timber painted exterior, a timber stud frame. They are raised high on piles for flood protection, stylistic reasons and to create a multipurpose sheltered area under the house. The elevation can sometimes provide a cooling effect in hot climates. They have wide verandahs (often the length of the house and enclosed by shutters), and roofs are gabled and corrugated iron. The street facing view is often symmetrical. The NSW Queenslander is often smaller than the original classic Queenslander and is less decorative probably due to limited supply of delicate timber detail and trades-people to build them. It is sometimes combined with the Ranch style house.

From the 1840s, a specific style of building emerged in Queensland. The Queenslander style of houses are identifiable by large verandahs and large double doors which open onto these verandahs, stilts rising the house above ground level (particularly in older houses), metal roofs typically of corrugated design and the houses are always constructed of mostly wood.

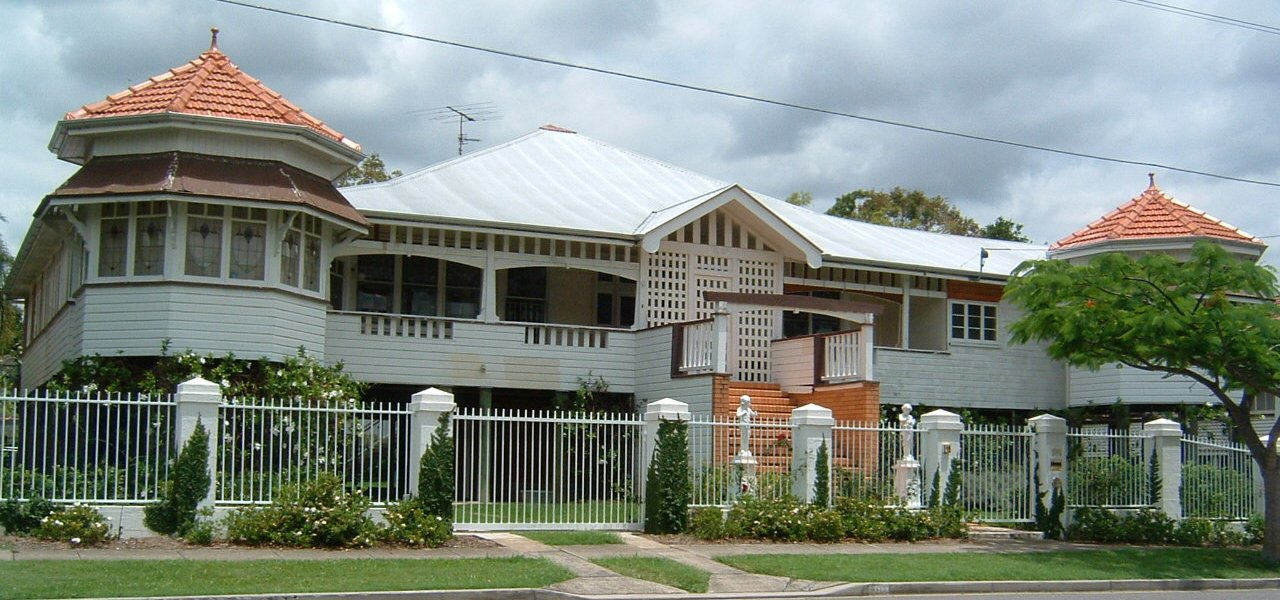
Federation-style Queenslander

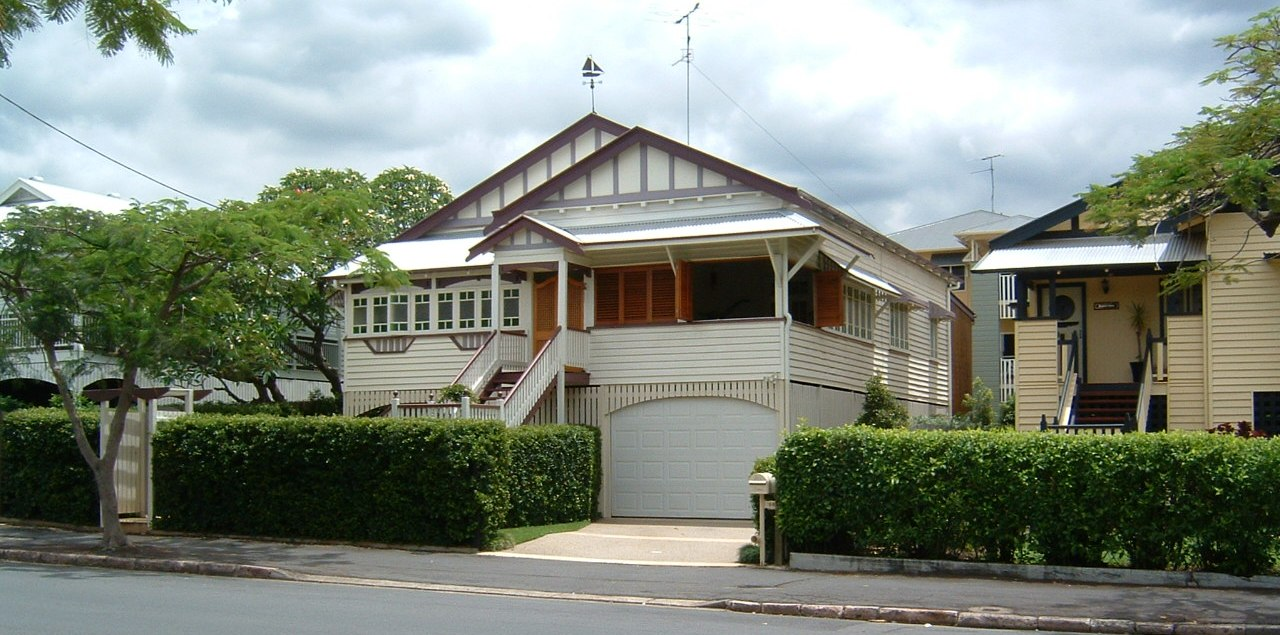
Inter-war Queenslander

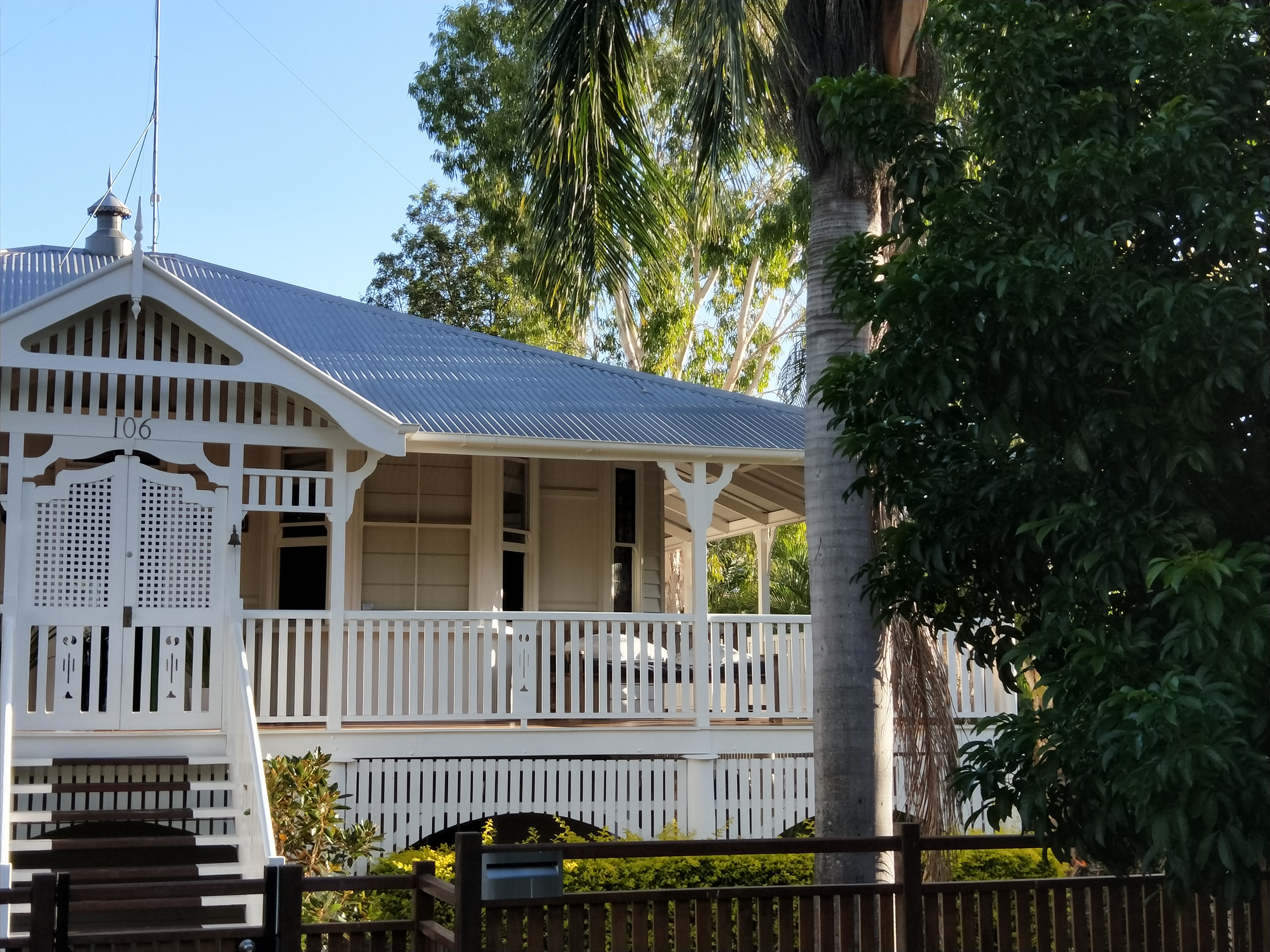
Victorian era Queenslander

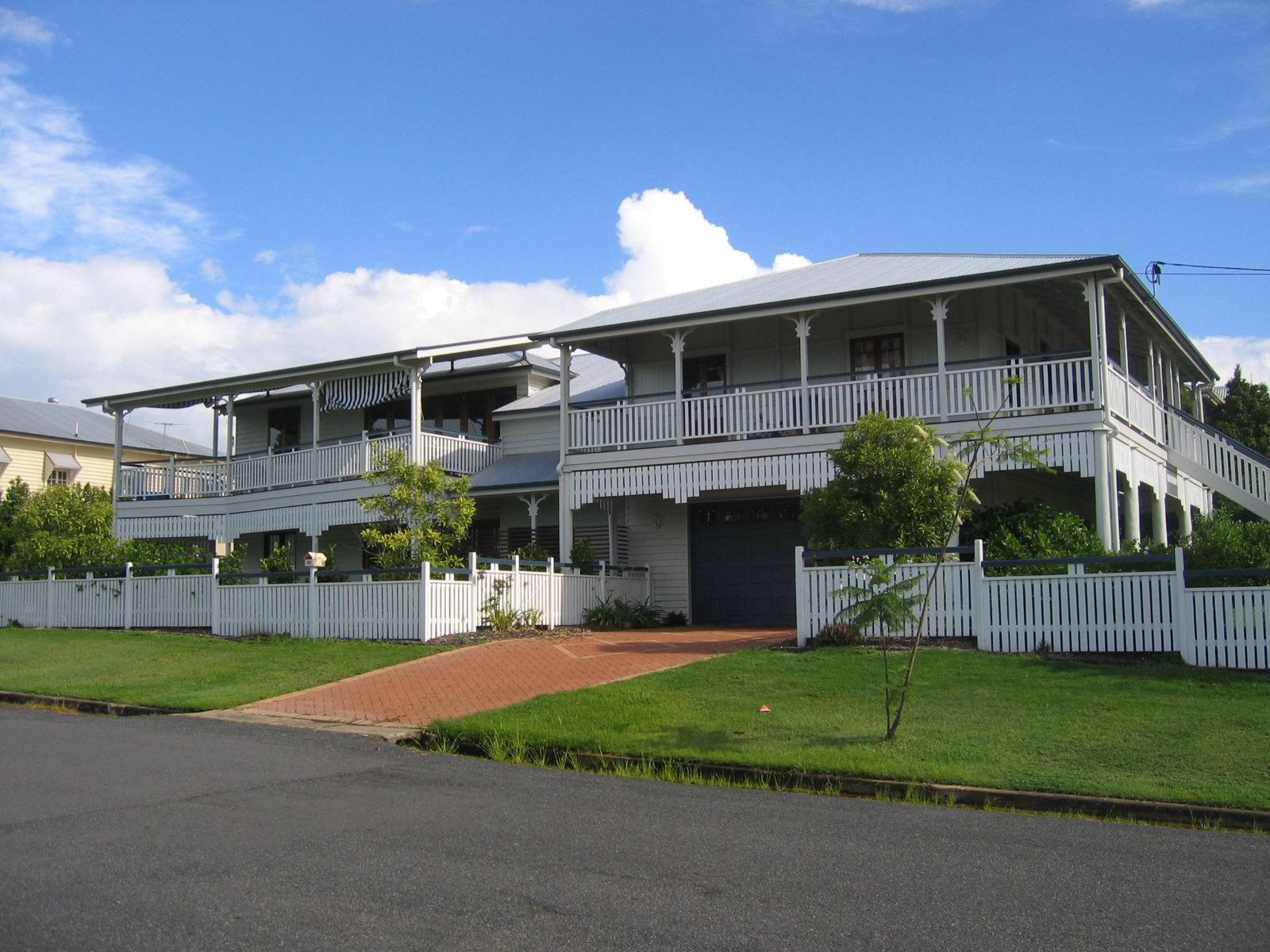
A typical 'Queenslander' style house in Brisbane

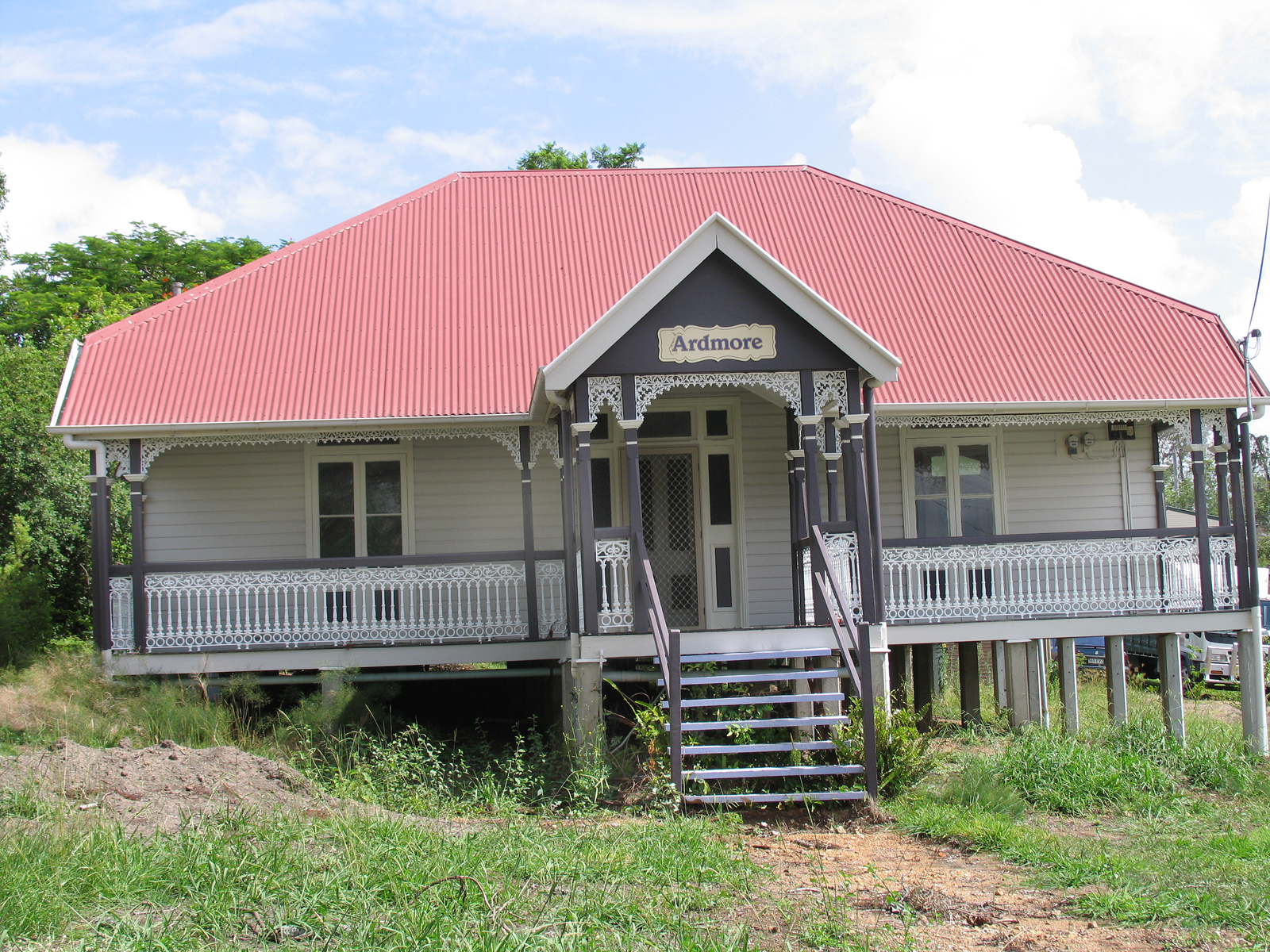
An old Queenslander in Kilcoy

==== Victorian Free Gothic ====
The Gothic style gained favour from the early days of Queen Victoria's reign. Free Gothic became a popular choice for architects and their clients because it was not concerned with historical correctness and therefore gave them greater freedom in their designs. The style was much in vogue for religious buildings but was sometimes used in residential architecture as well.

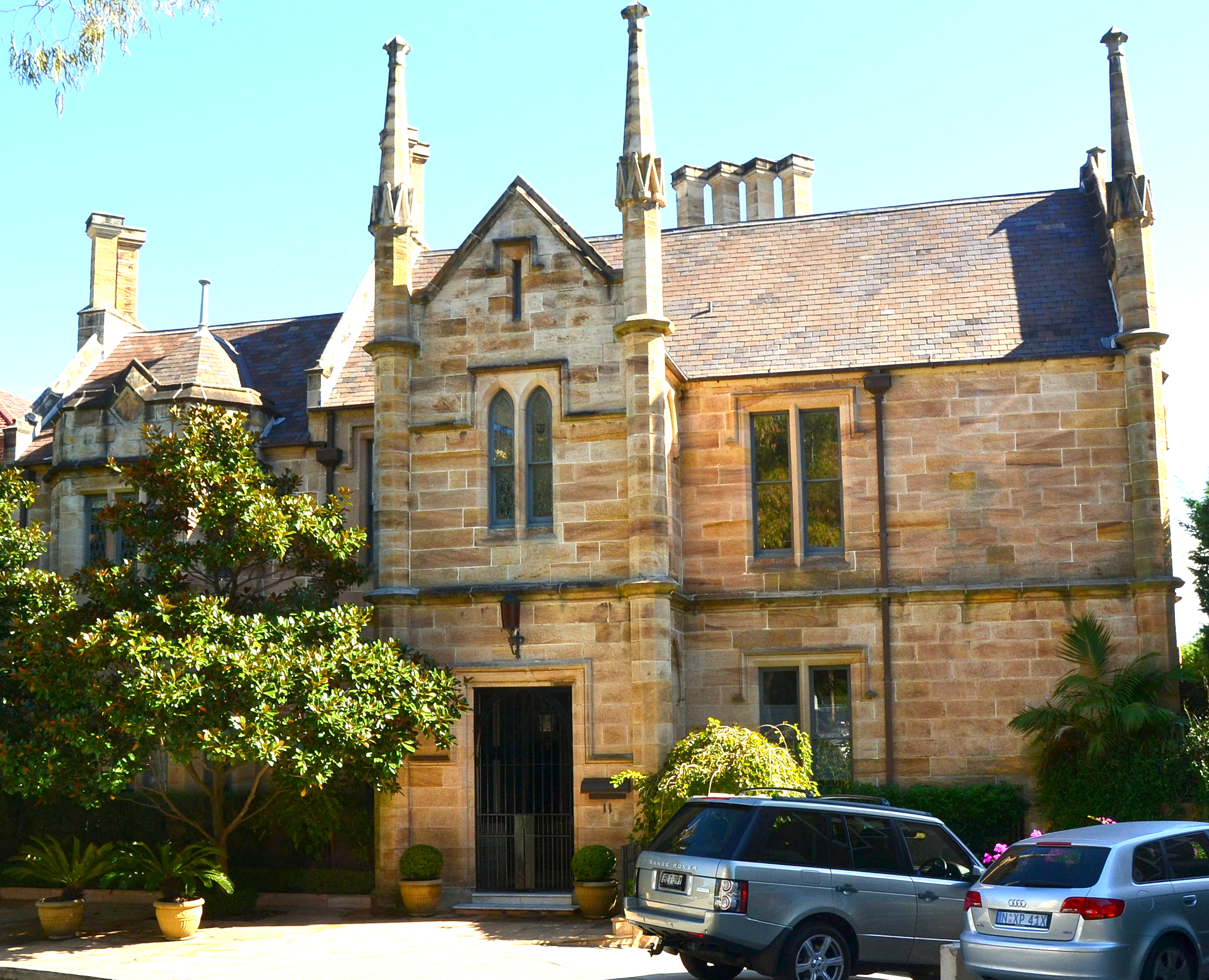
Gladswood House, Double Bay. Sydney Built 1862–1864.

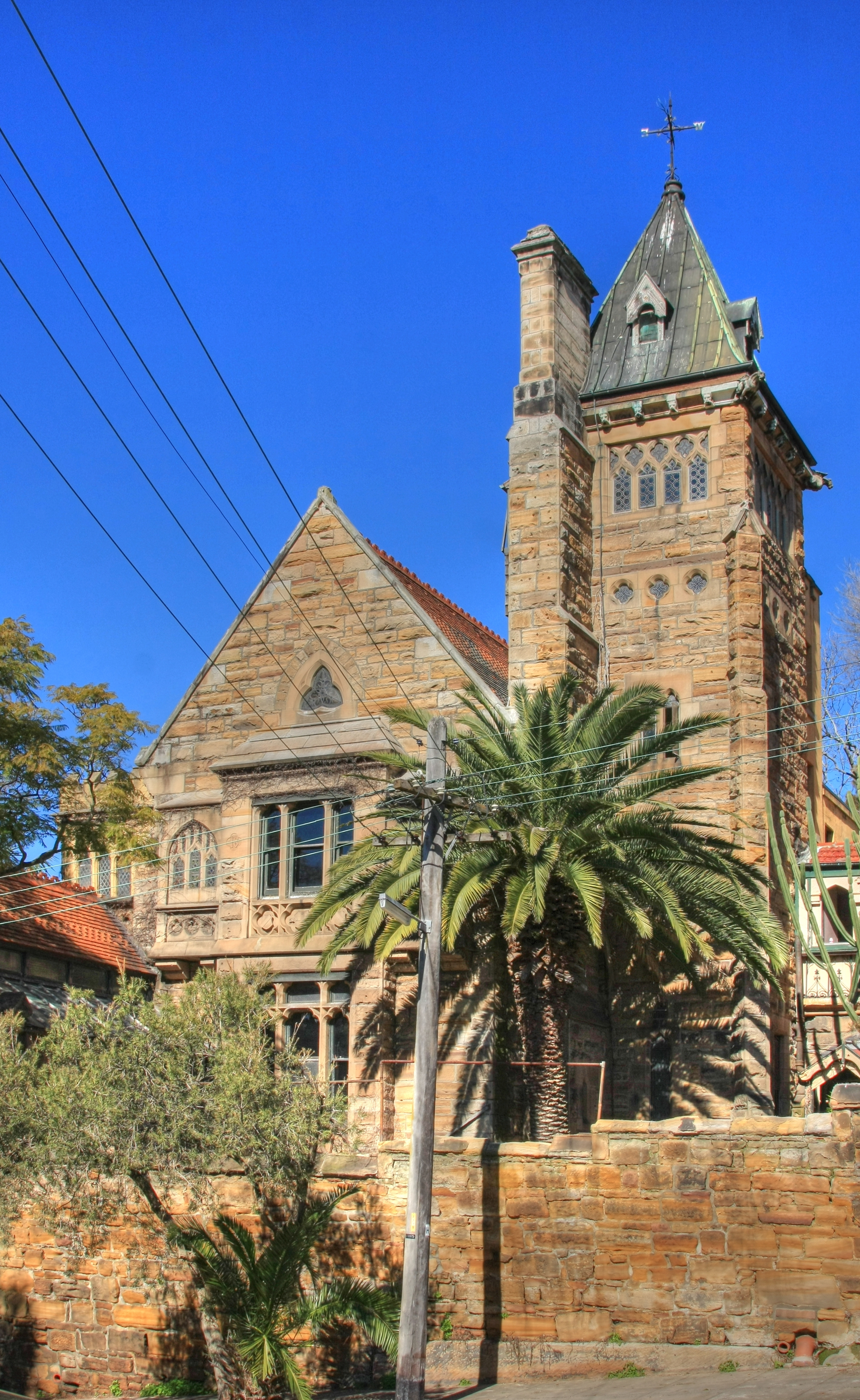
The Abbey, Annandale. Completed 1882.

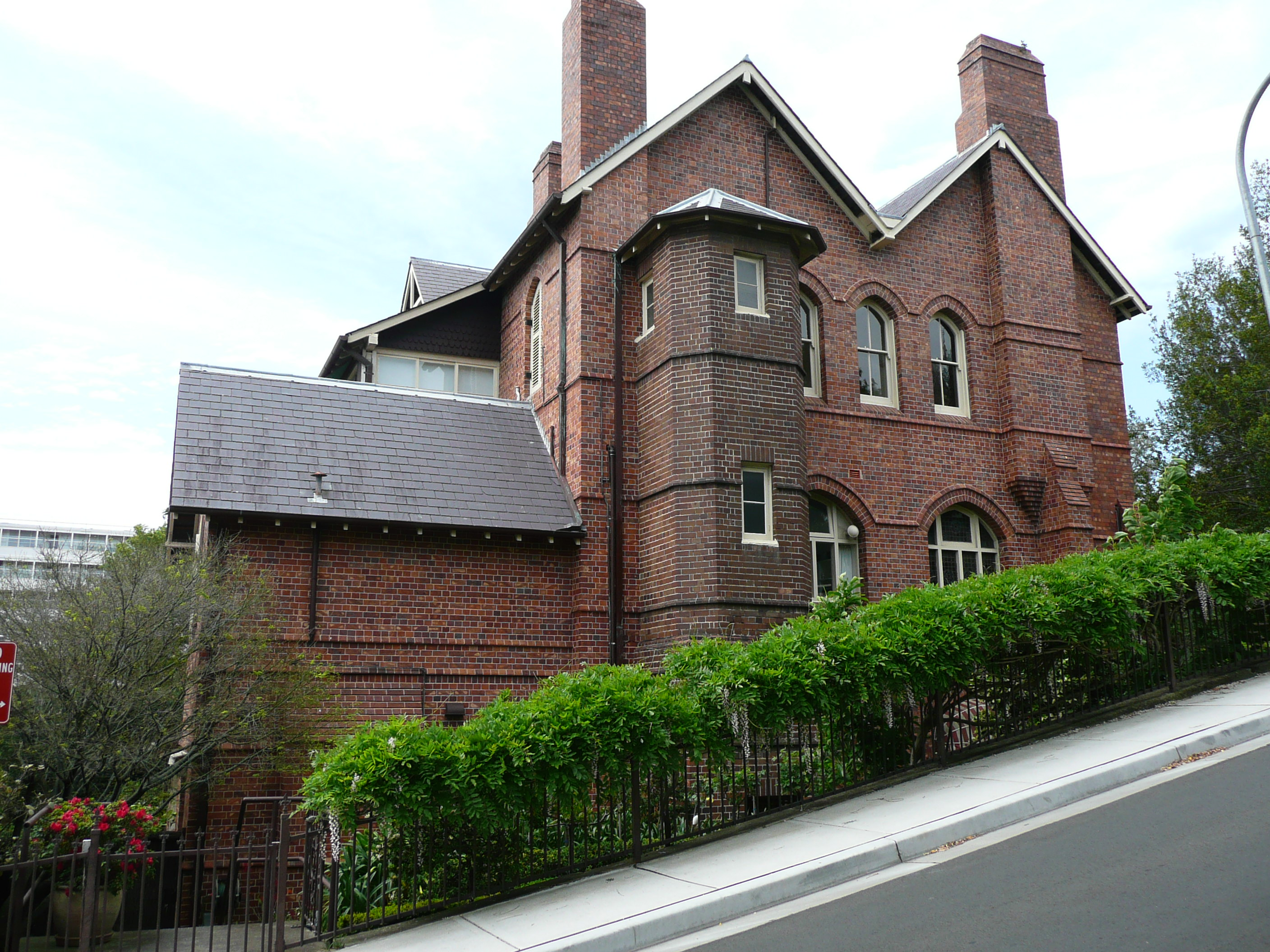
Cloncorrick, Darling Point. 1884.

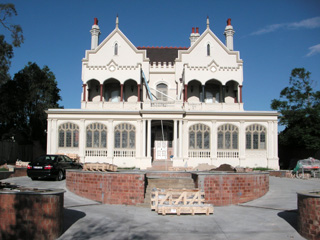
Ambleside, Ashfield. Built 1886–88.

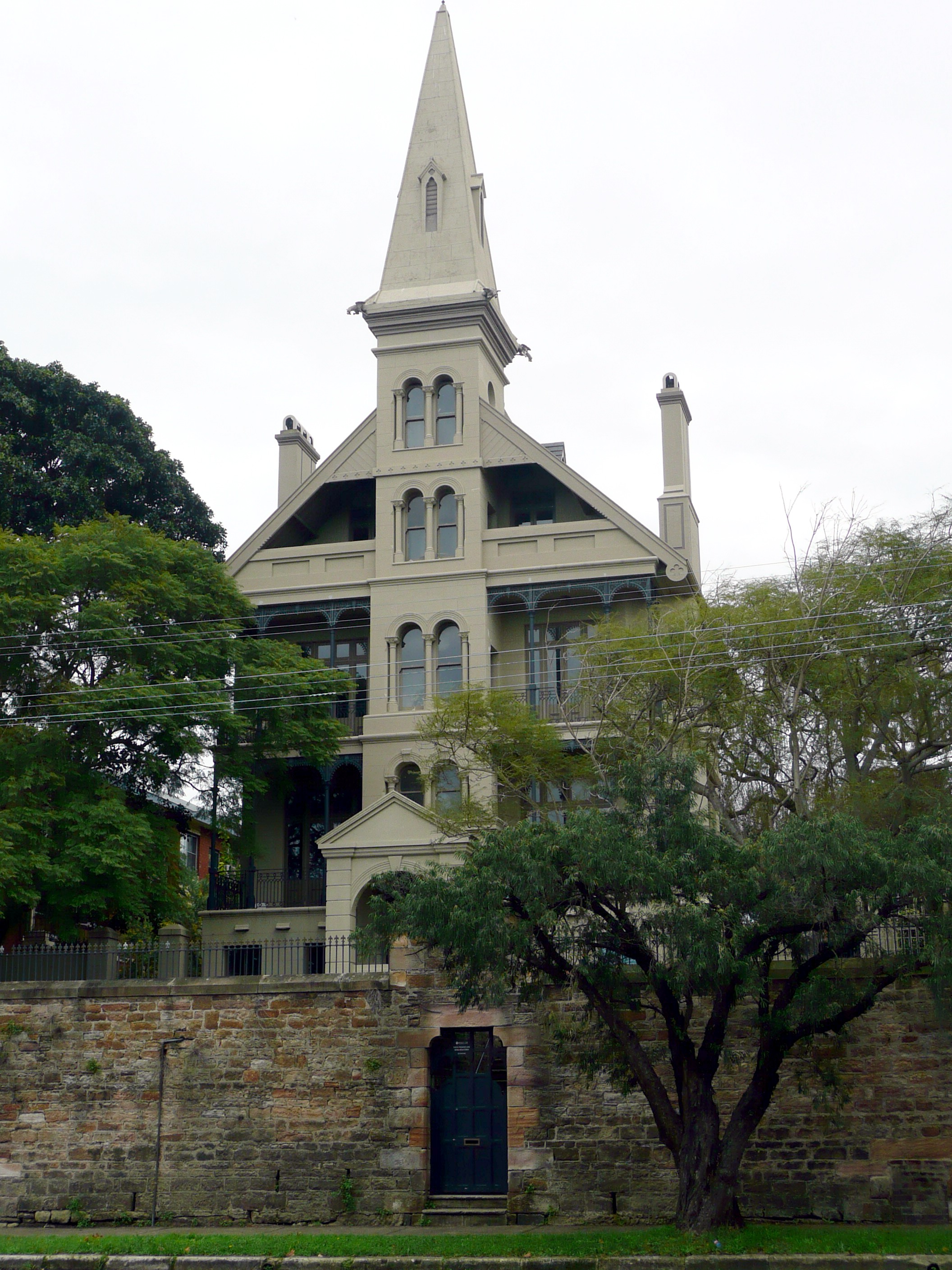
Kenilworth, Annandale; completed 1889. Free Gothic with Romanesque influences.

==== Victorian Rustic Gothic ====
The Rustic Gothic style developed out of a "cult of the picturesque" which largely focused on rural images and especially the picturesque rustic house, which became known as the cottage orne. In Australia, this style had a great appeal to British settlers who still carried with them a hankering for things English.

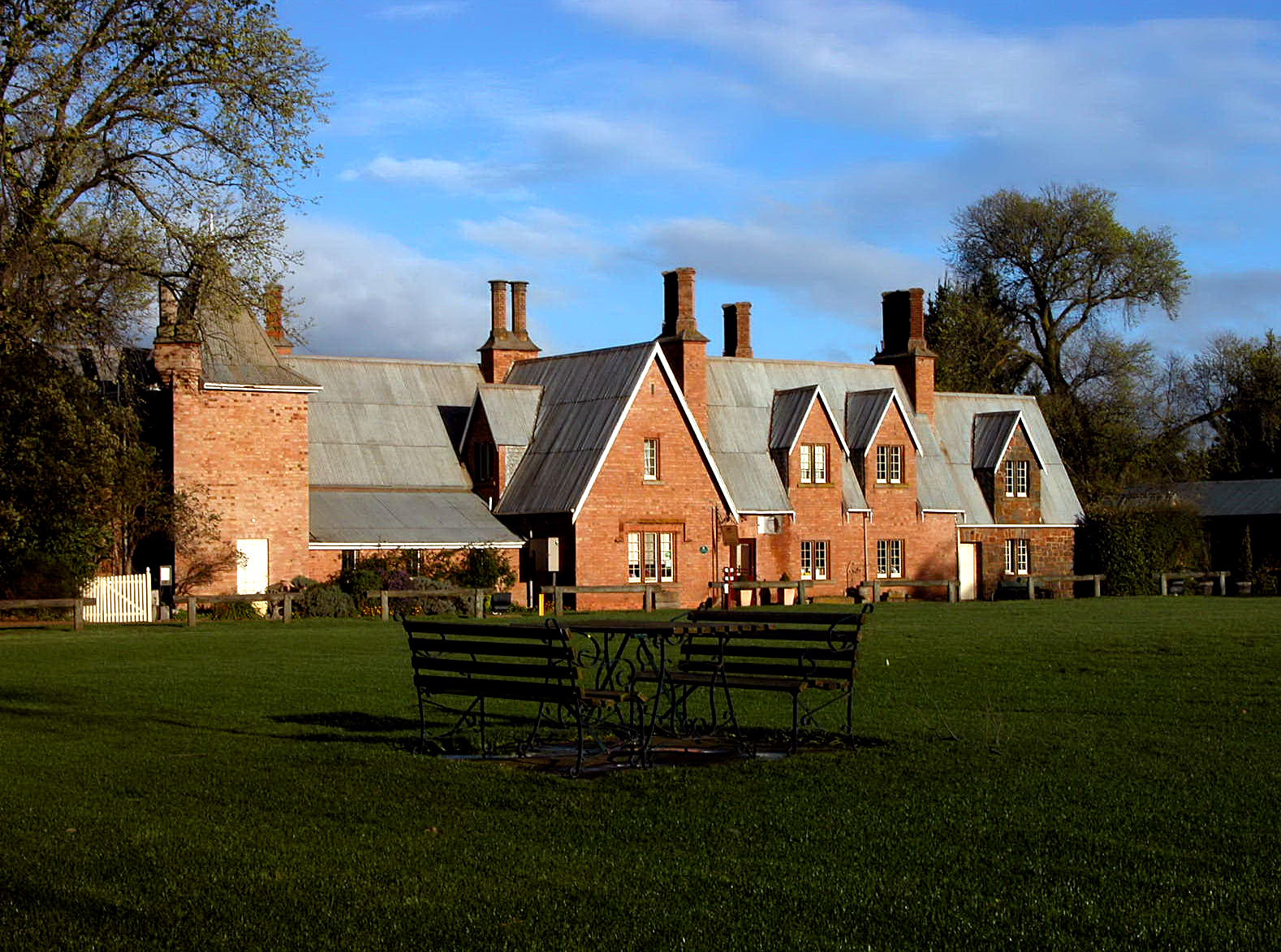
The Grange, Campbell Town. Completed 1847.

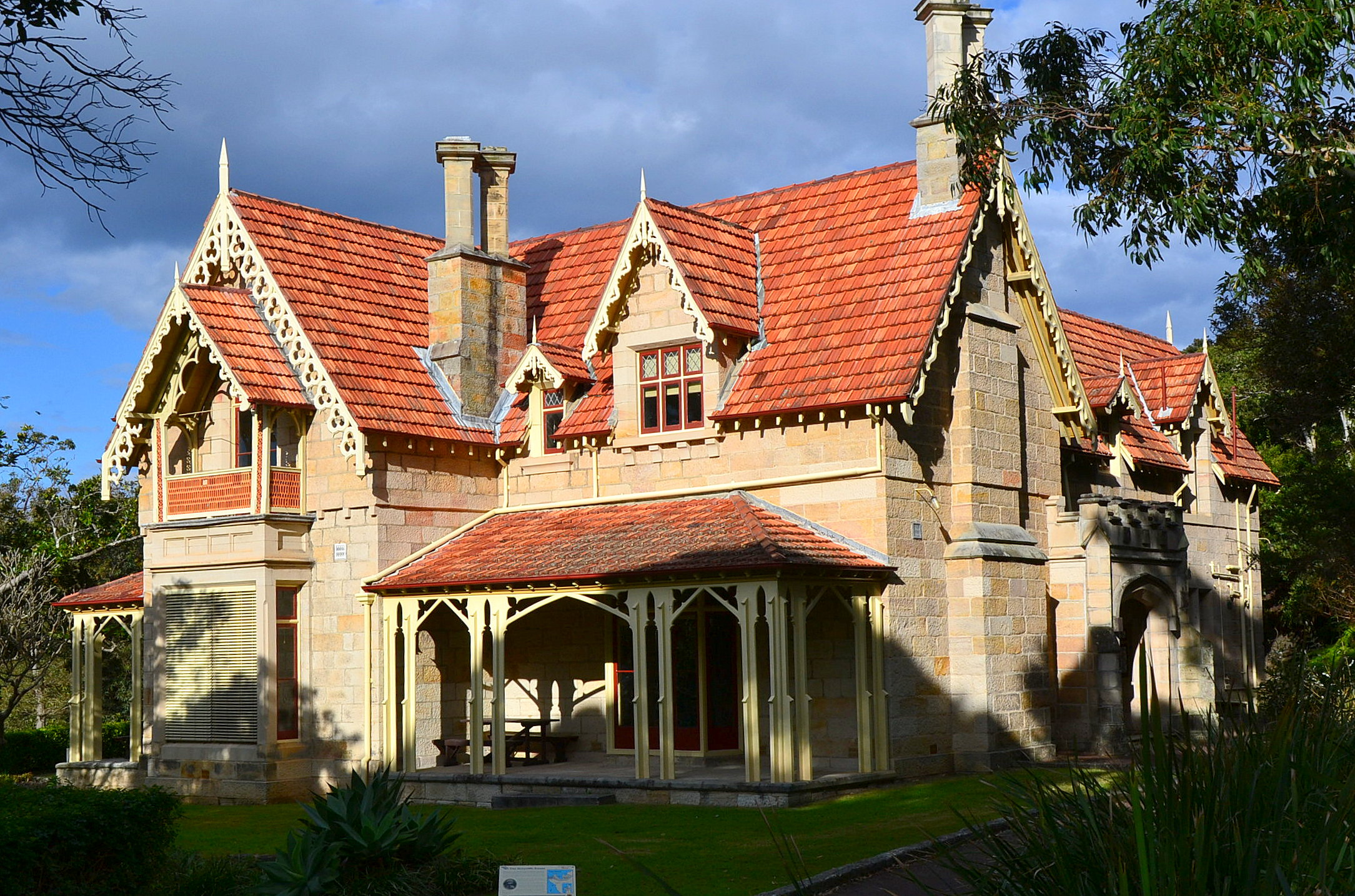
Greycliffe House, Vaucluse. Completed c. 1852.

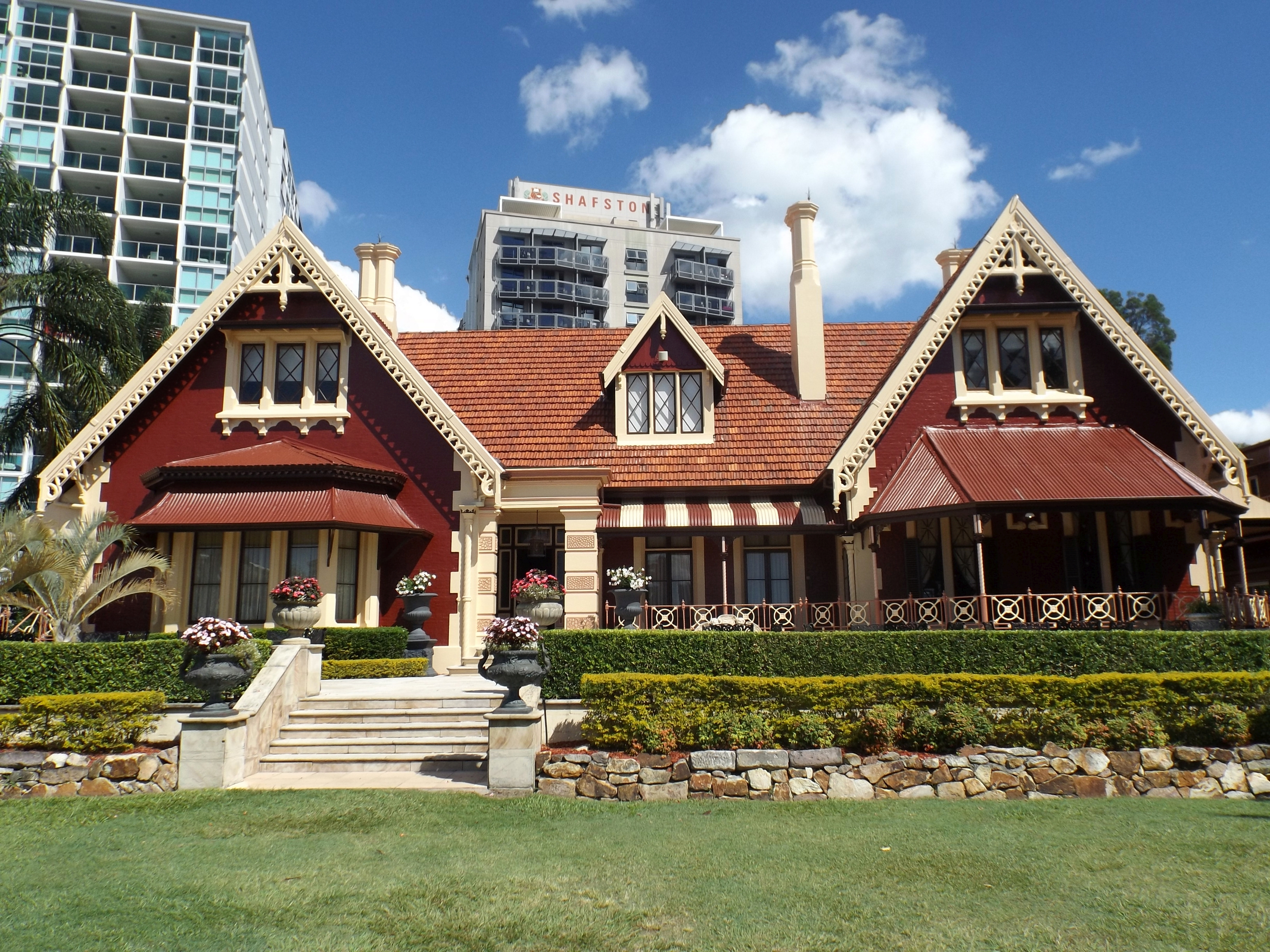
Shafston House, Kangaroo Point. 1852. Robin Dods

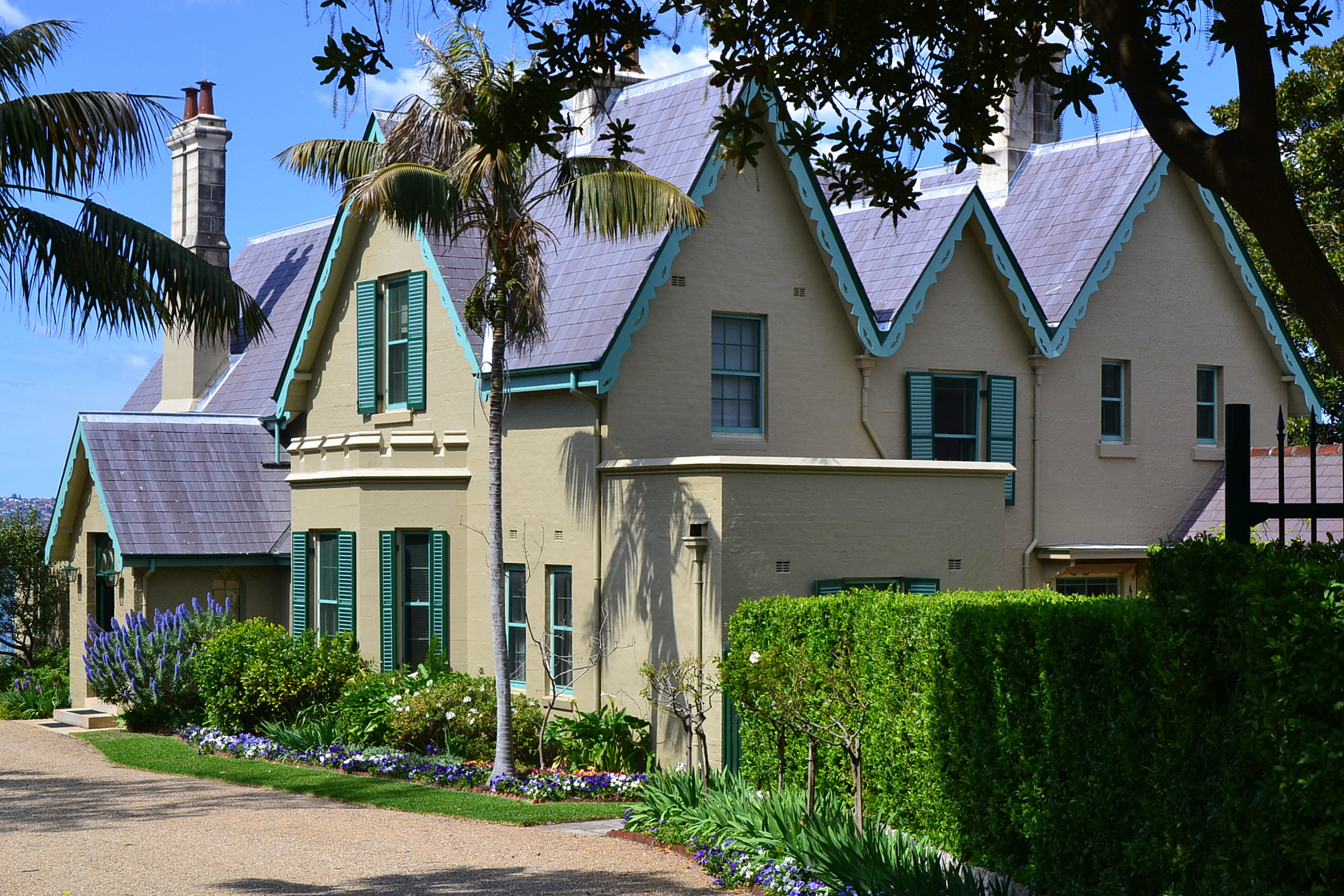
Kirribilli House, Kirribilli; built 1855.

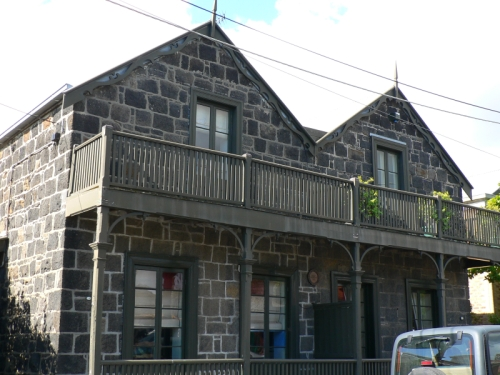
13 & 15 James Street, Richmond. Completed 1857.

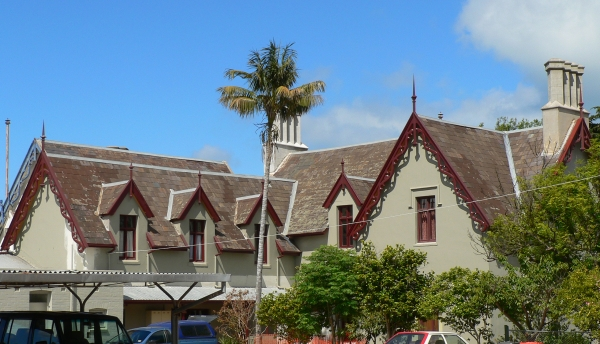
Glenfern, St Kilda East. Completed 1857.

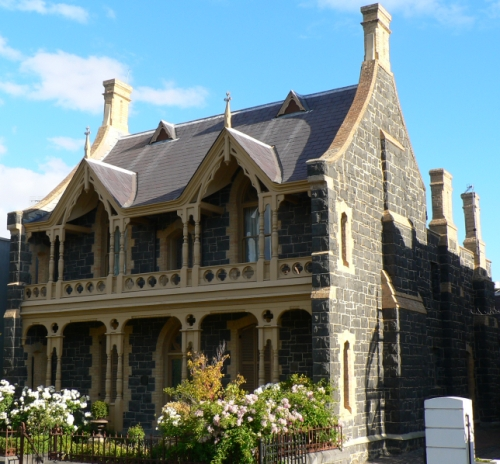
157 Hotham Street, East Melbourne. Completed 1861.

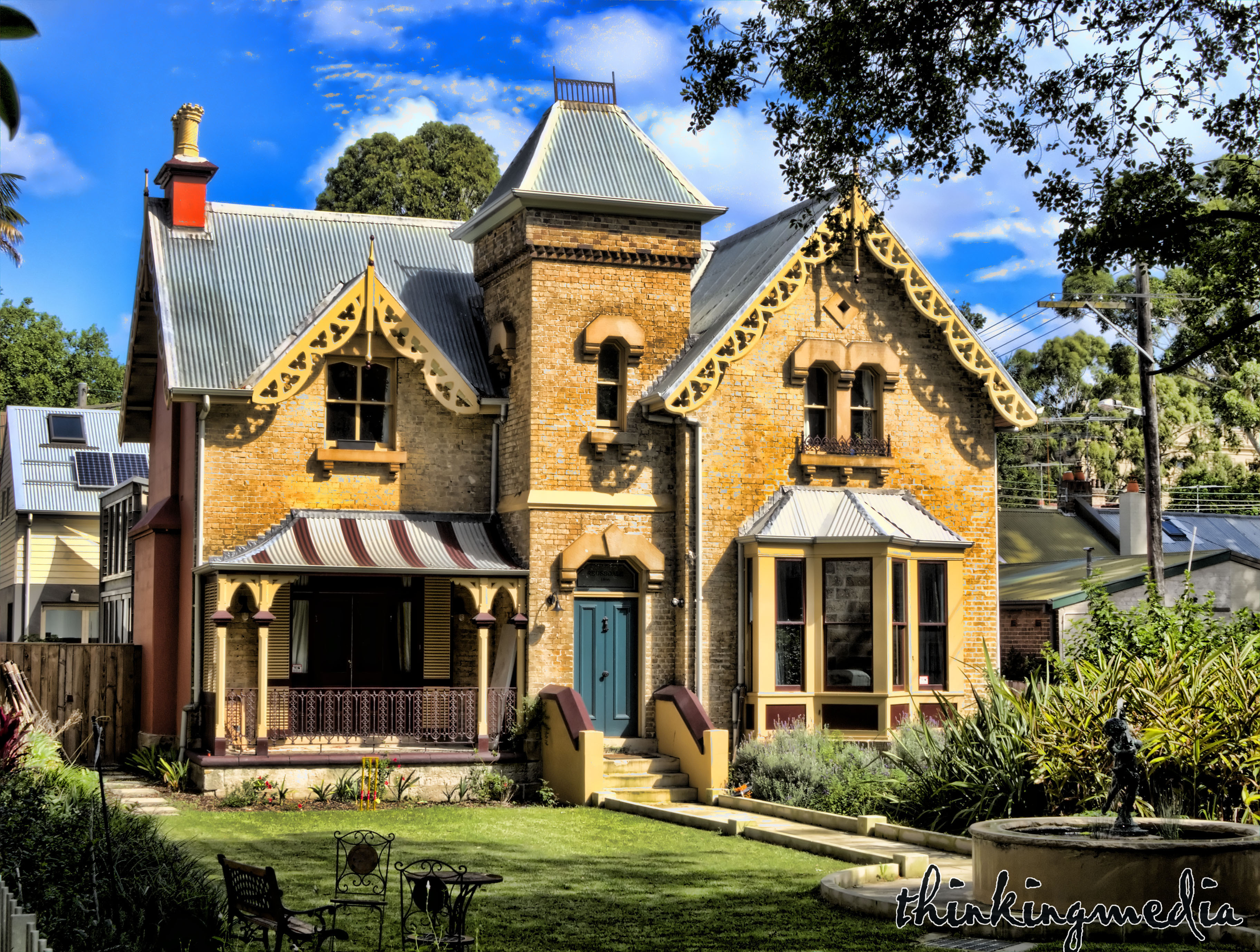
Reussdale, Glebe. Completed 1868

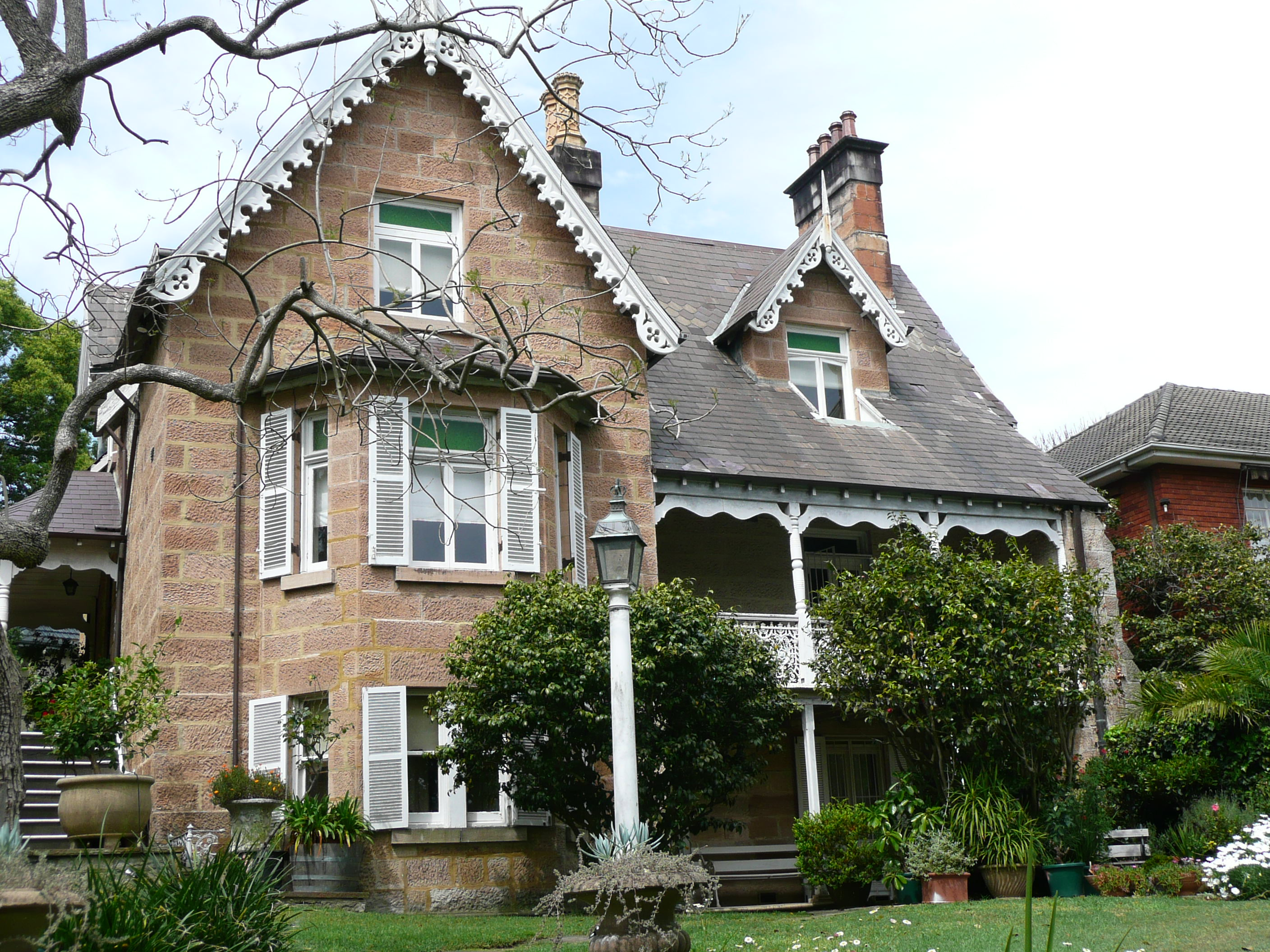
St Mark's Church, Darling Point. Designed by Edmund Blacket. 1873.

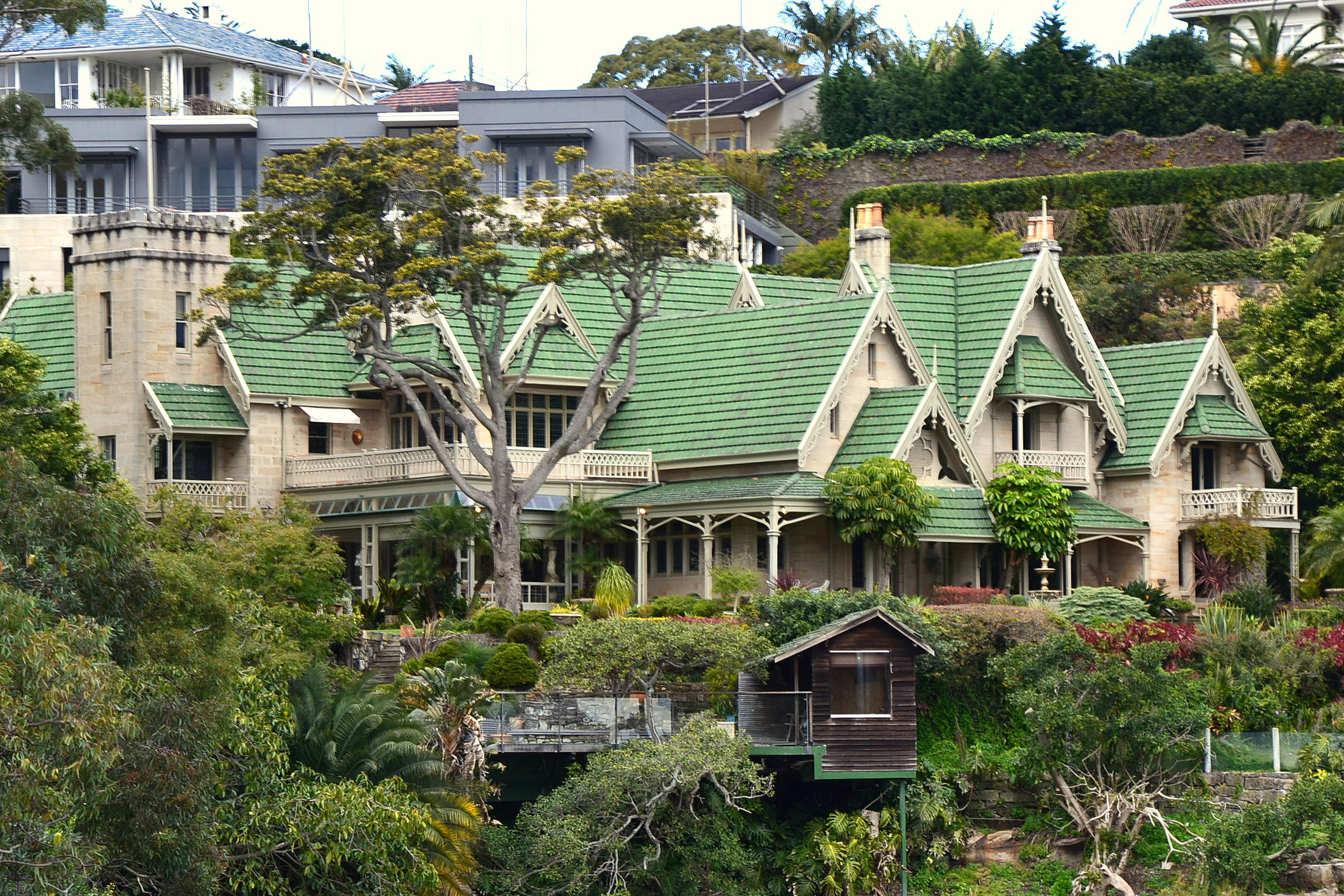
The Hermitage, Vaucluse. Built 1870–78.

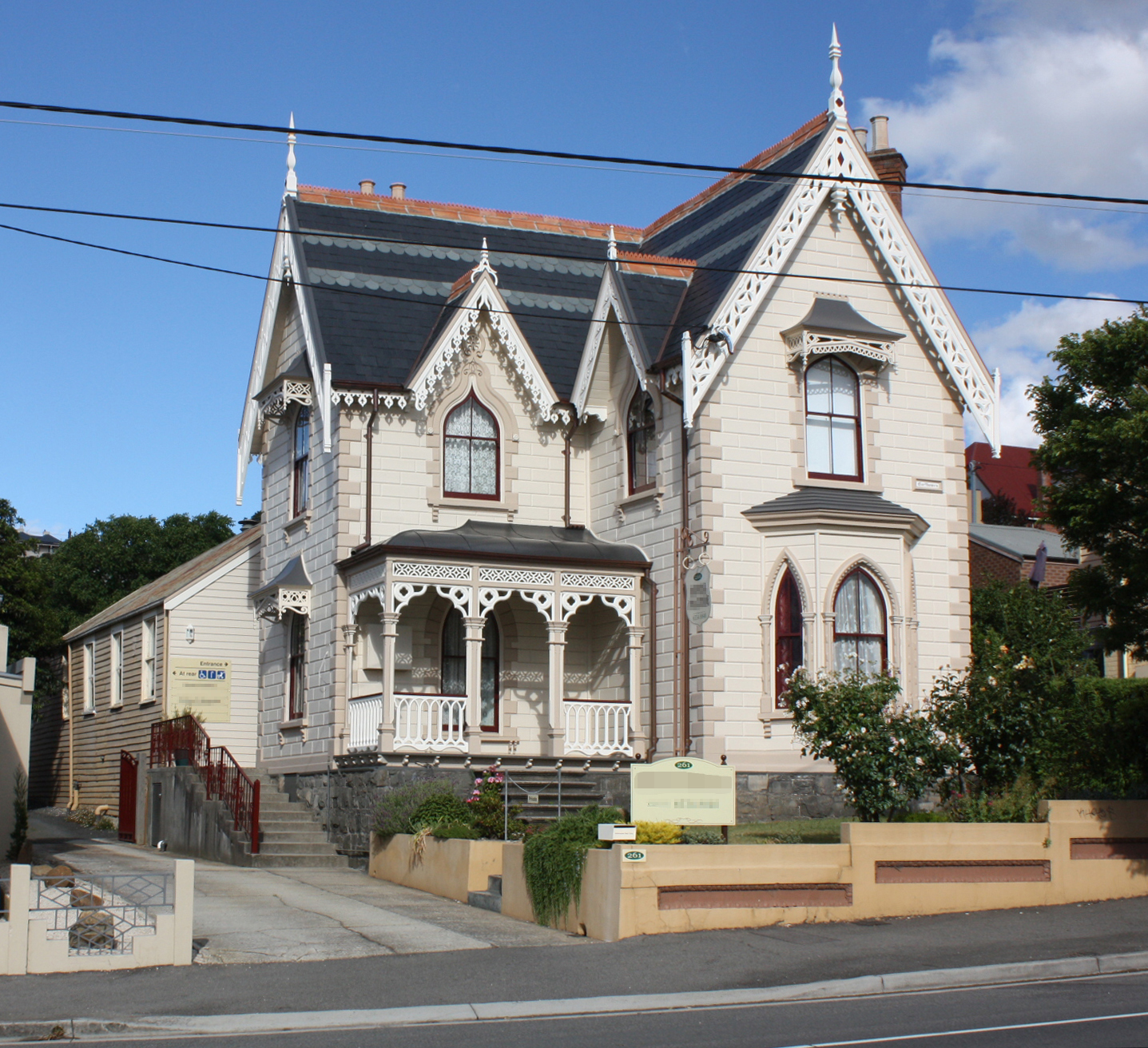
Garthowen, Launceston. Built 1879–82.

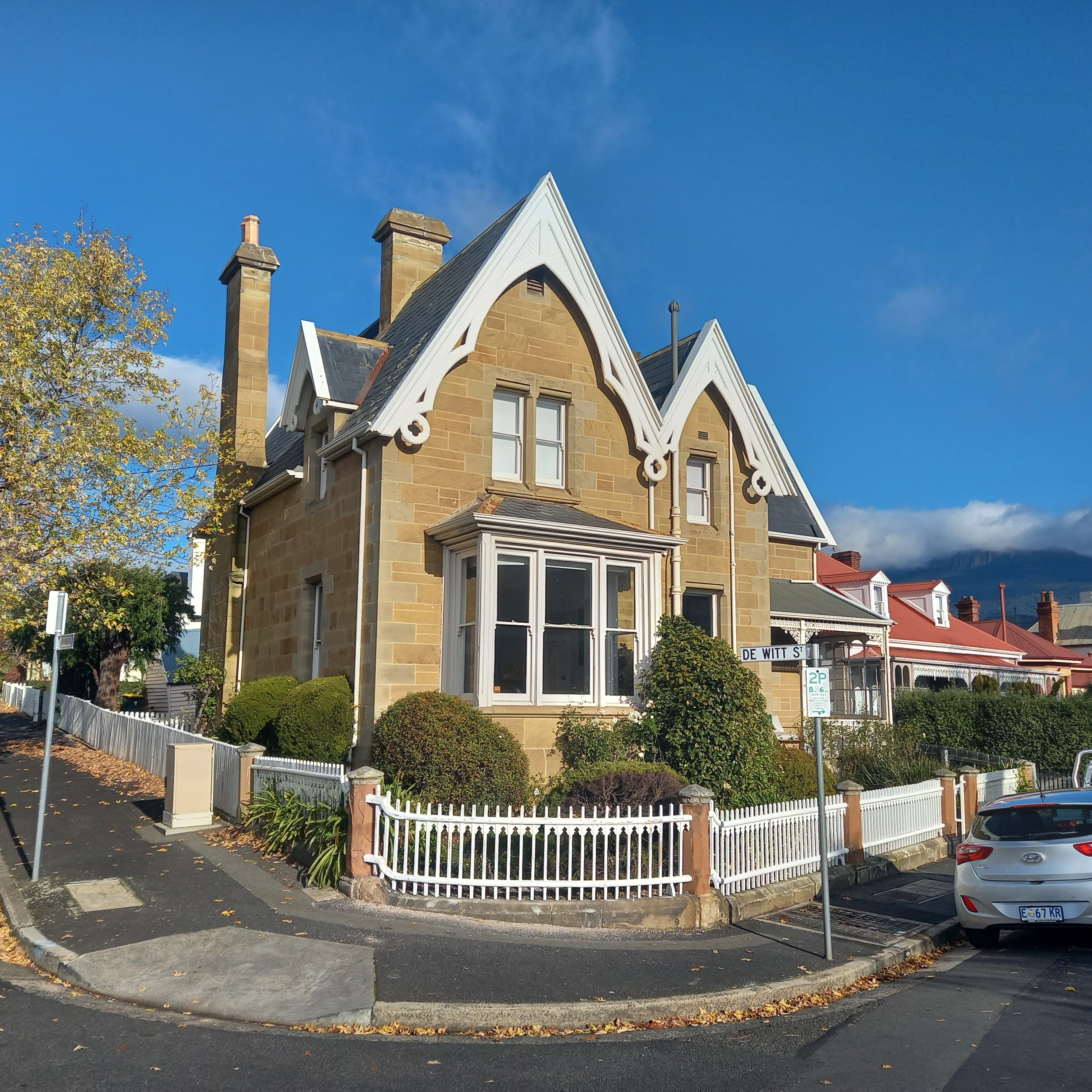
Invercoe, Battery Point. Built 1883.

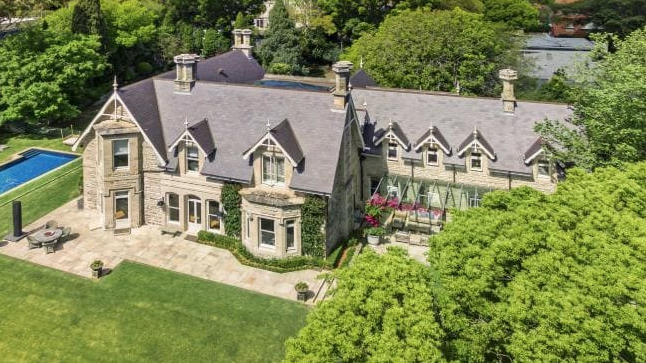
Rona, Bellevue Hill. Built 1883.

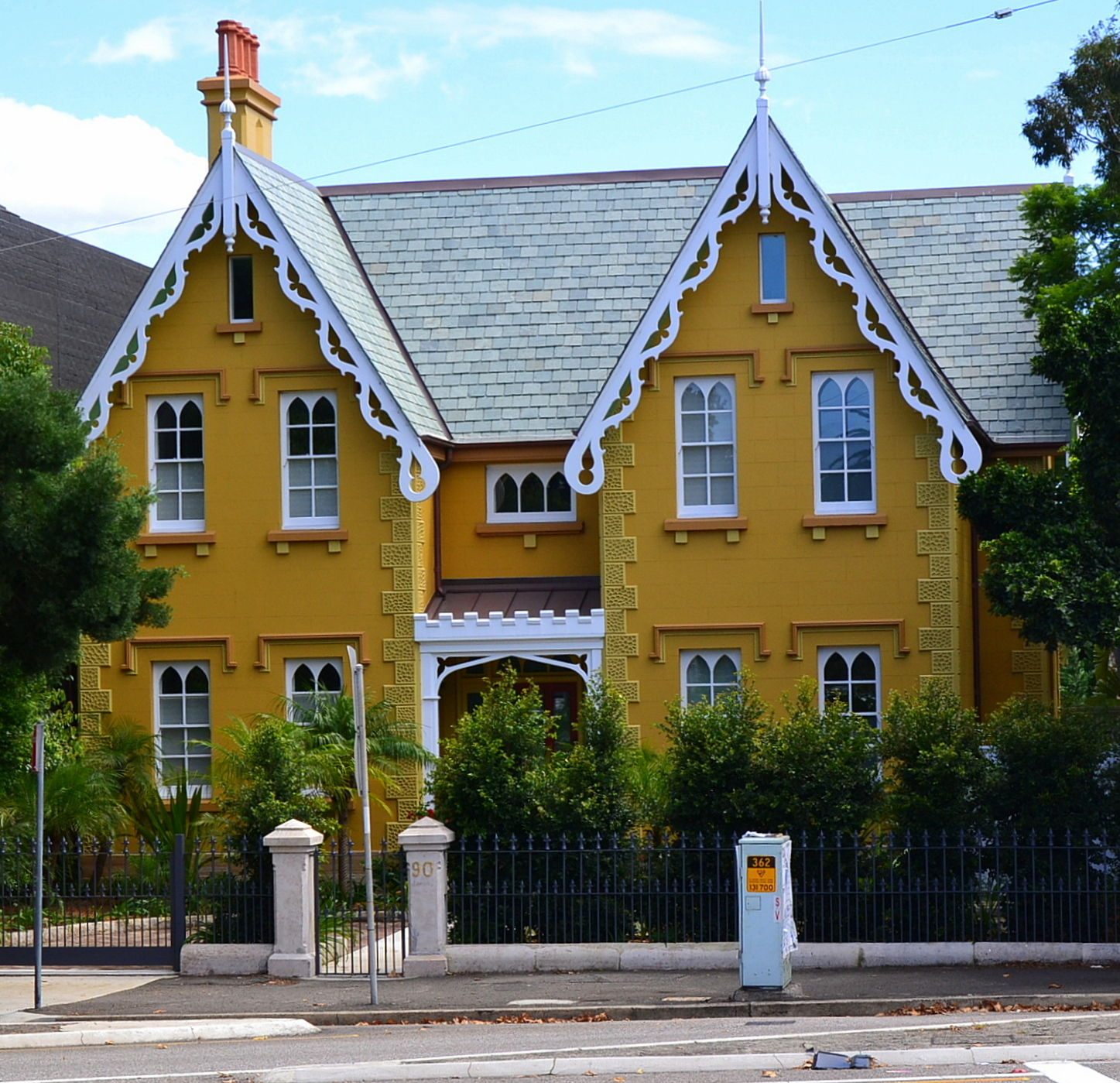
House in Woollahra

==== Victorian Tudor ====
The Tudor style grew out of a nostalgia for older English concepts, particularly focusing on the days of Elizabeth I and Henry VIII. Its role in Australia began when the English architect Edward Blore designed the Sydney Government House in 1834. The style spread all over Australia and also influenced later styles like Federation Queen Anne and Inter-War Old English.

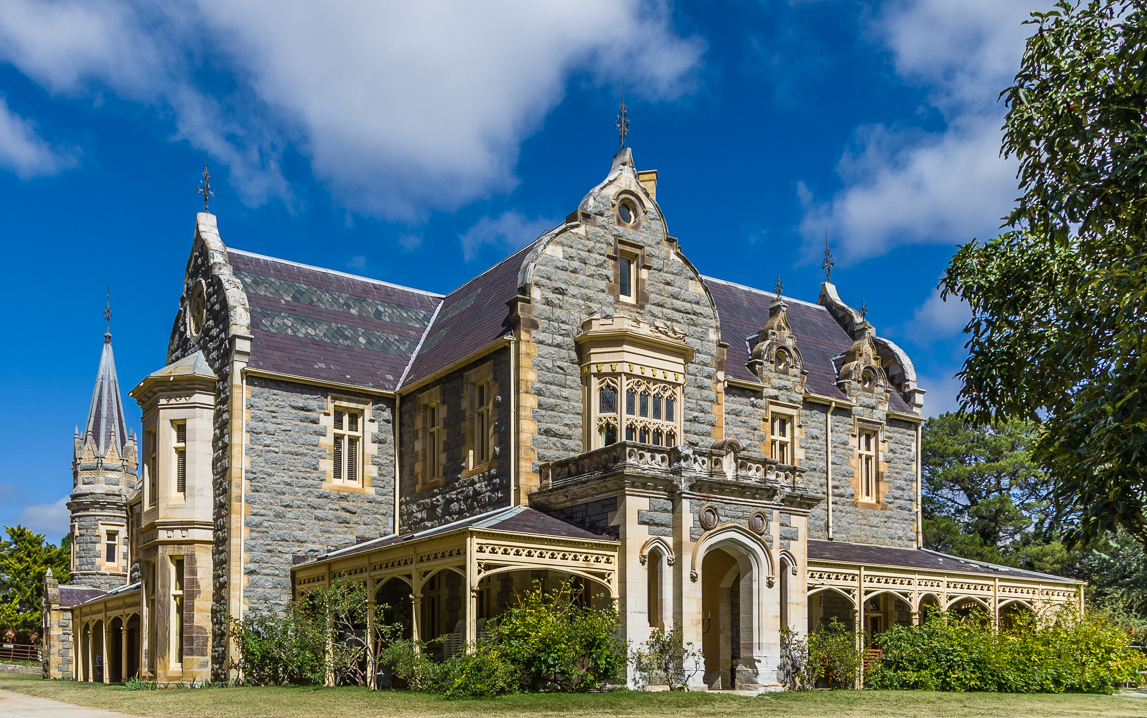
Abercrombie House, Bathurst. Completed 1878.

Swifts, Darling Point. Designed in 1882, this house later became the official residence of the Catholic Archbishop of Sydney.

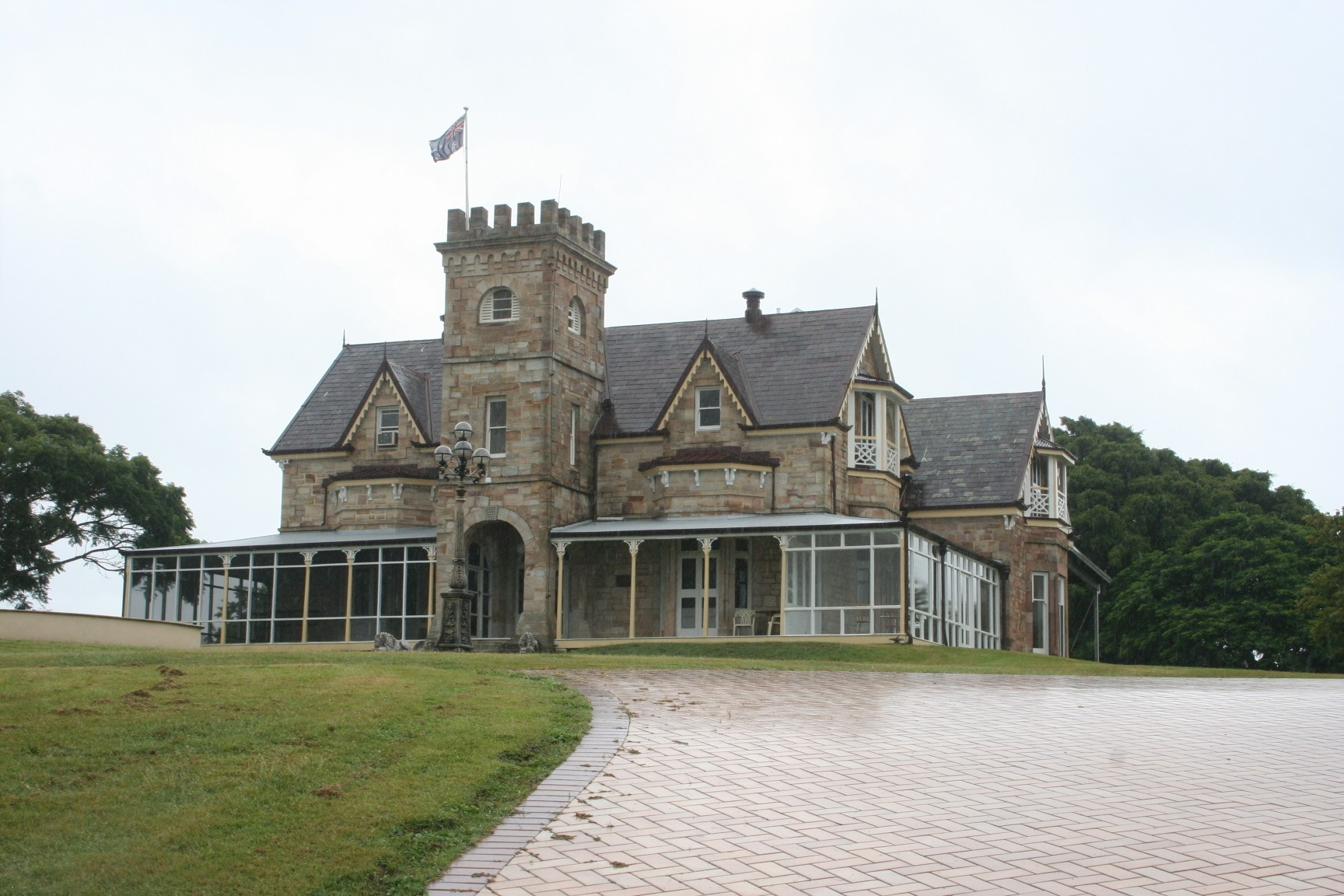
Toorak House, Brisbane, remodelled 1891

=== Federation period c. 1890 – c. 1915 ===
The Edwardian style was named after King Edward (1901–1910) at the time, and was the predominant style in the United Kingdom and its colonies. The style draws on elements of the Victorian era and the earlier Queen Anne style of the early 18th century. The Edwardian style coincided with the Federation of Australia. Thus, the Federation style was, broadly speaking, the Australian version of the Edwardian, but differed from the Edwardian in the use of Australian motifs, like kangaroos, the rising sun (of Federation), and emus, Australian flora and geometric designs. Some of the most recognisable Federation/Edwardian features include red brick exteriors with embellished wood detail known as fretwork. Cream painted decorative timber features, tall chimneys were all common. Stained glass windows towards the front of the home became increasingly popular during this period. Internally, Victorian-era features were still evident, including plaster ceiling roses and cornices and timber skirting and architraves. Federation style depicted a Tudor type look, especially on gables, and Edwardian gave a simpler cottage look. Terracotta tiles or galvanised iron are generally used for roofing, which is designed with a steep pitch. The gable ends and roof eaves often feature ornate timber brackets, and timber detailing and fretwork are a common inclusion on verandahs.

Some consider that this style was the Federation version of the Queen Anne style. Other styles during this period were Federation Academic Classical, Federation Free Classical, Federation Filligree, Federation Anglo-Dutch, Federation Romanesque, Federation Gothic, Federation Carpenter Gothic, Federation Warehouse, Federation Free Style, Federation Arts and Crafts and Federation Bungalow. The names all indicated very similar styles with features so minute separating them. Out of the twelve Federation styles, however, only the following four were normally used in residential architecture:

==== Federation Queen Anne ====
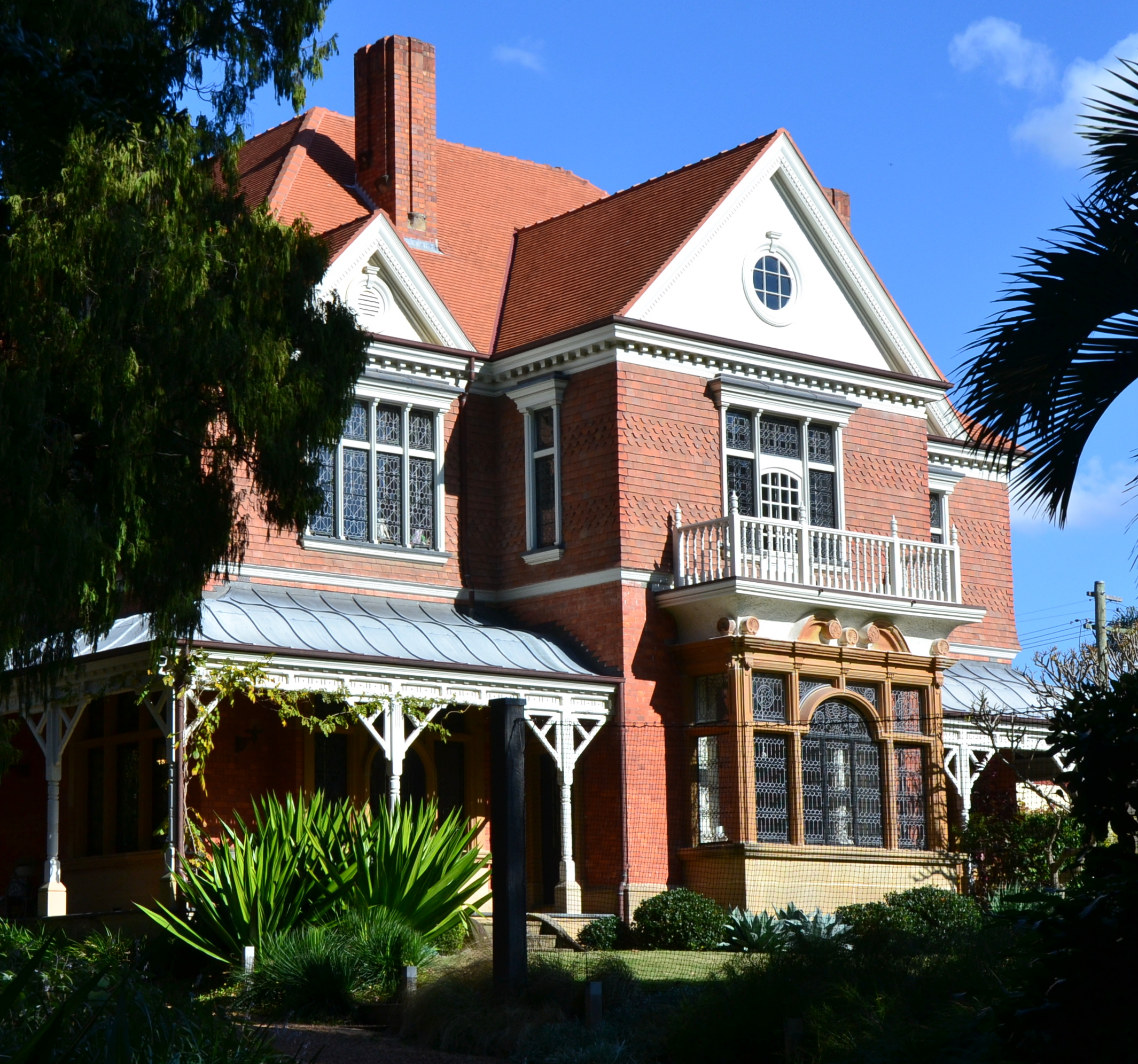
Caerleon, Bellevue Hill, the first Queen Anne Style home in Australia. Built c.1885.

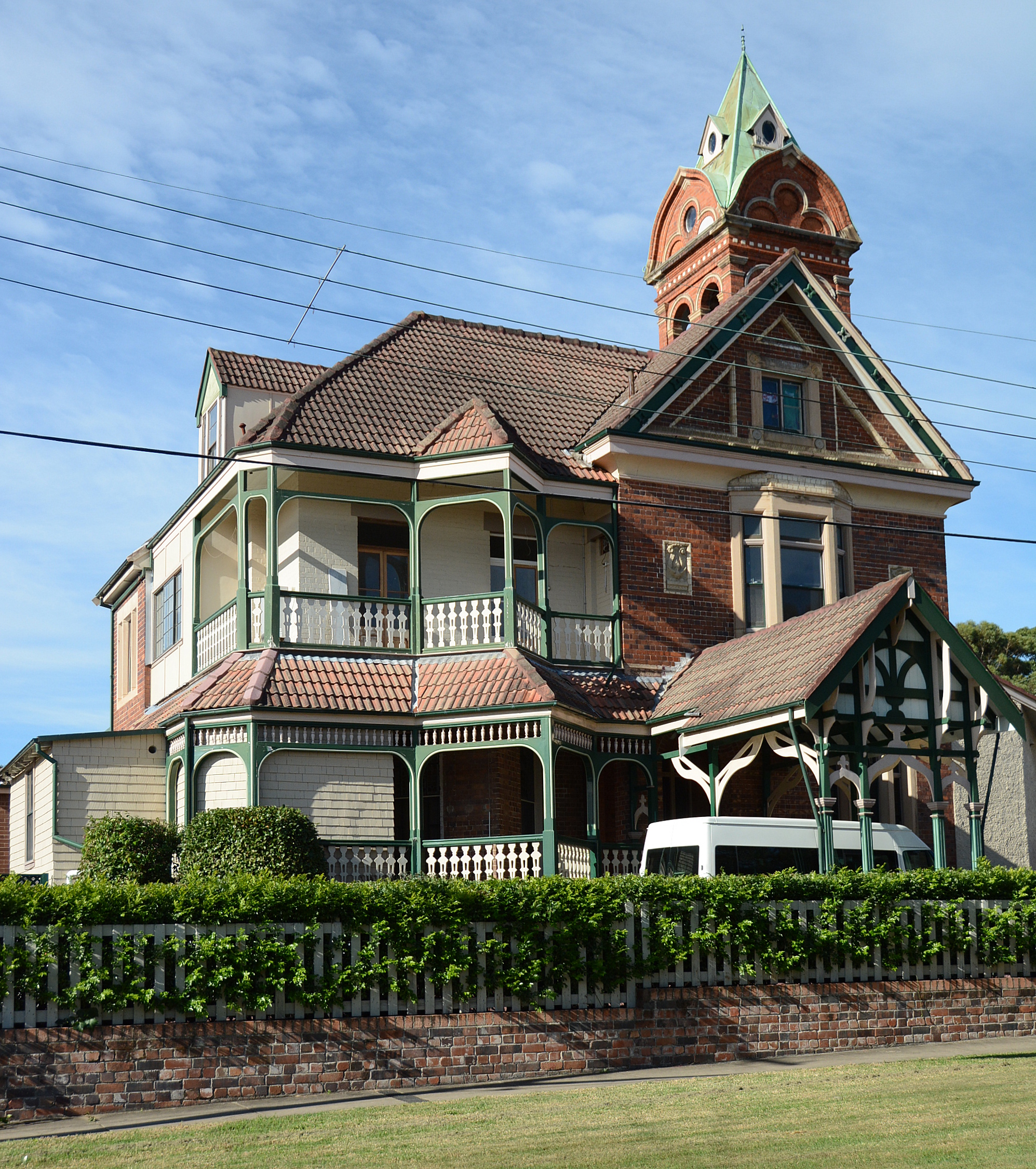
Amesbury, Ashfield; an early elaborate example of the Queen Anne style. Built c.1888.

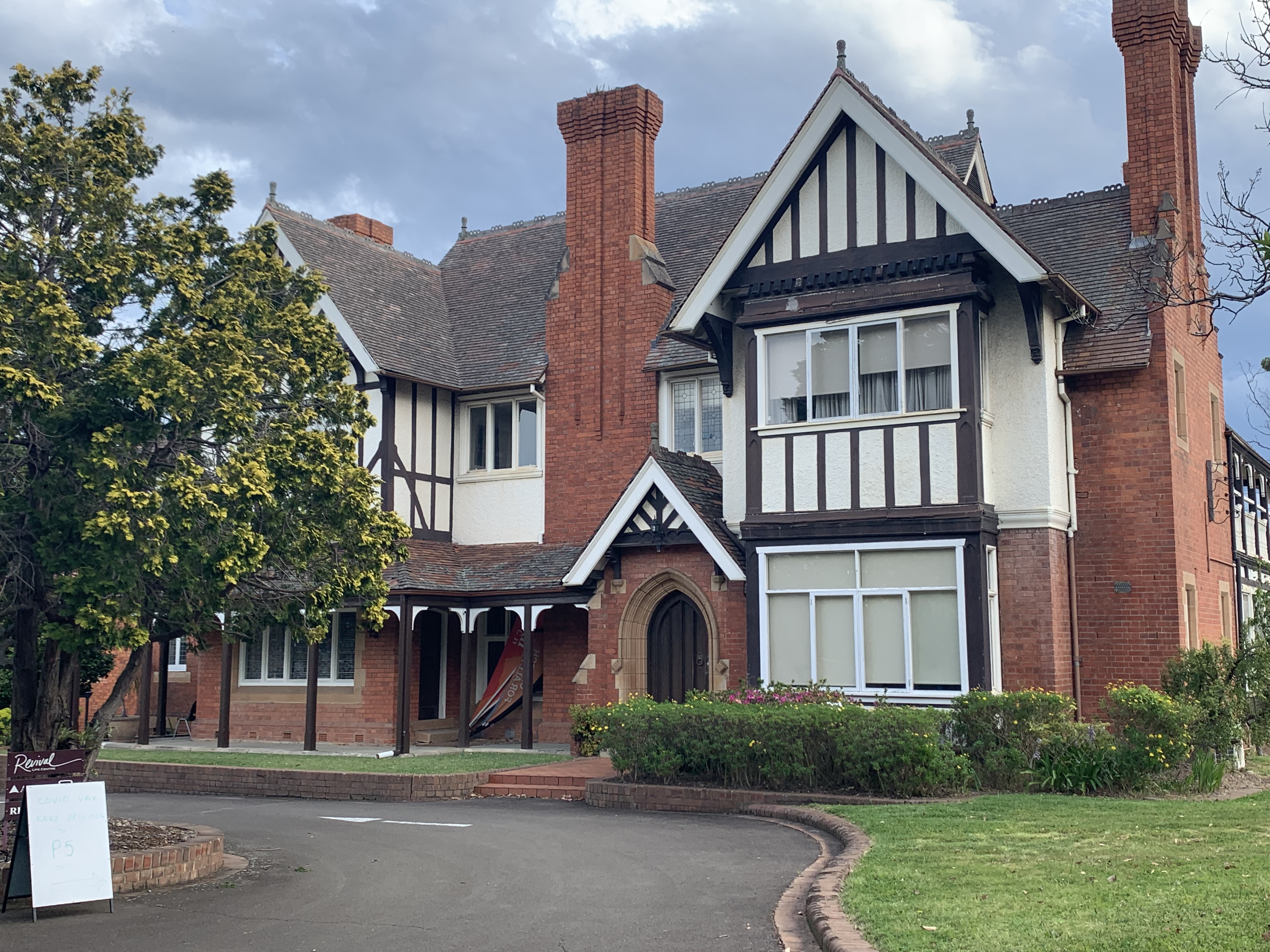
West Maling, Penshurst. Built c.1889.

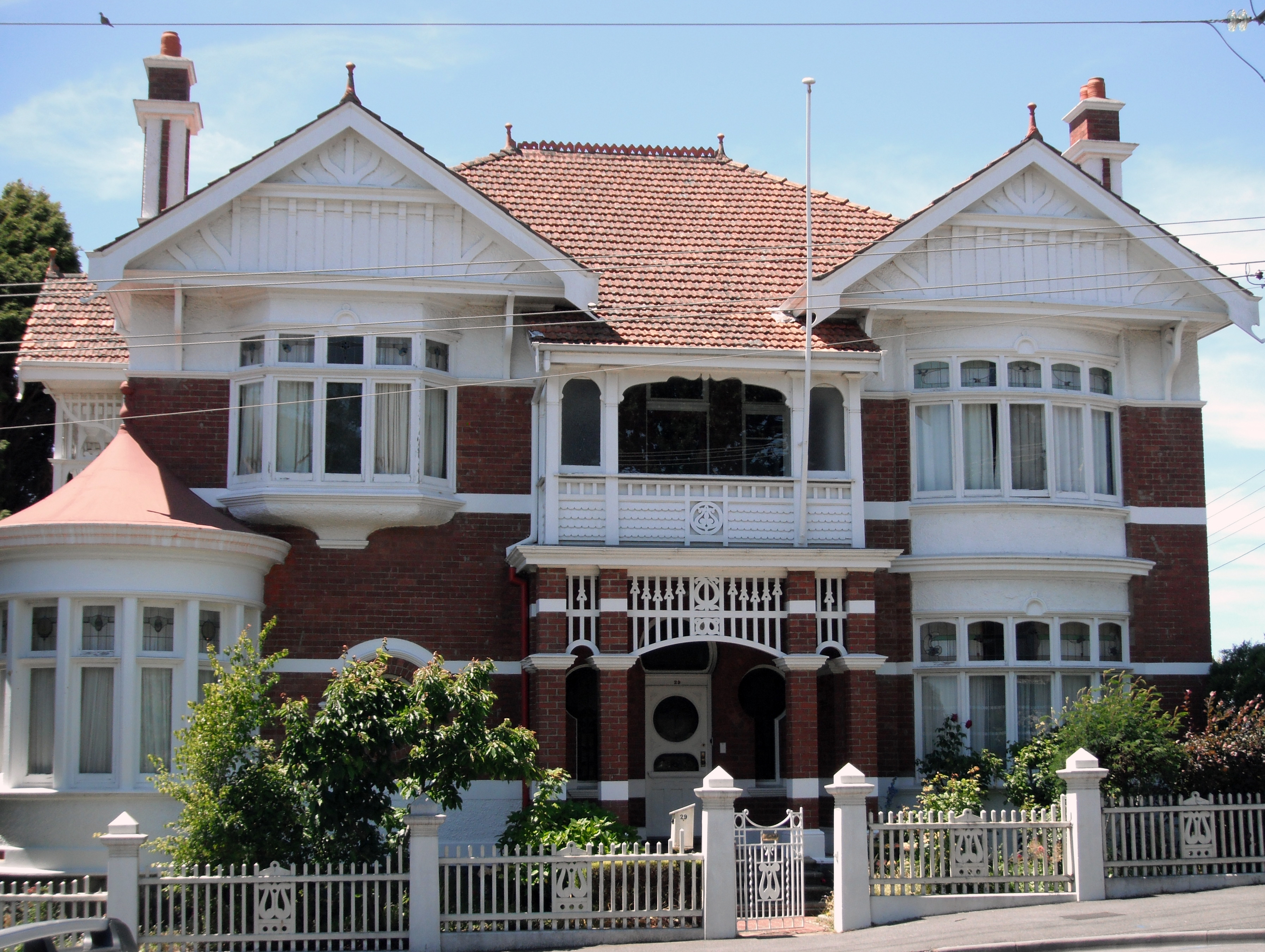
Hillcrest, Launceston; built c.1900.

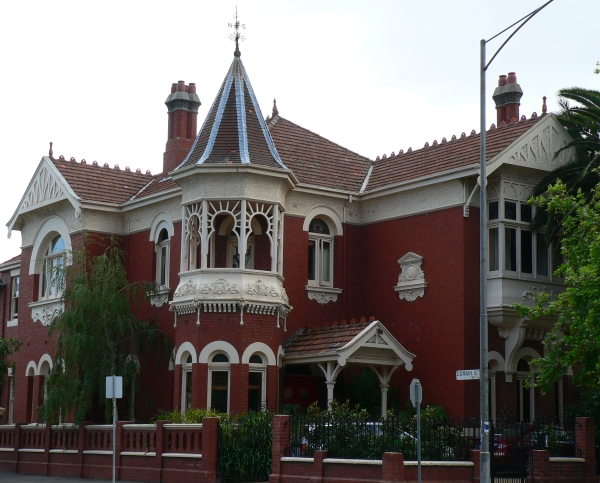
The Tilba, South Yarra. Completed in 1907.

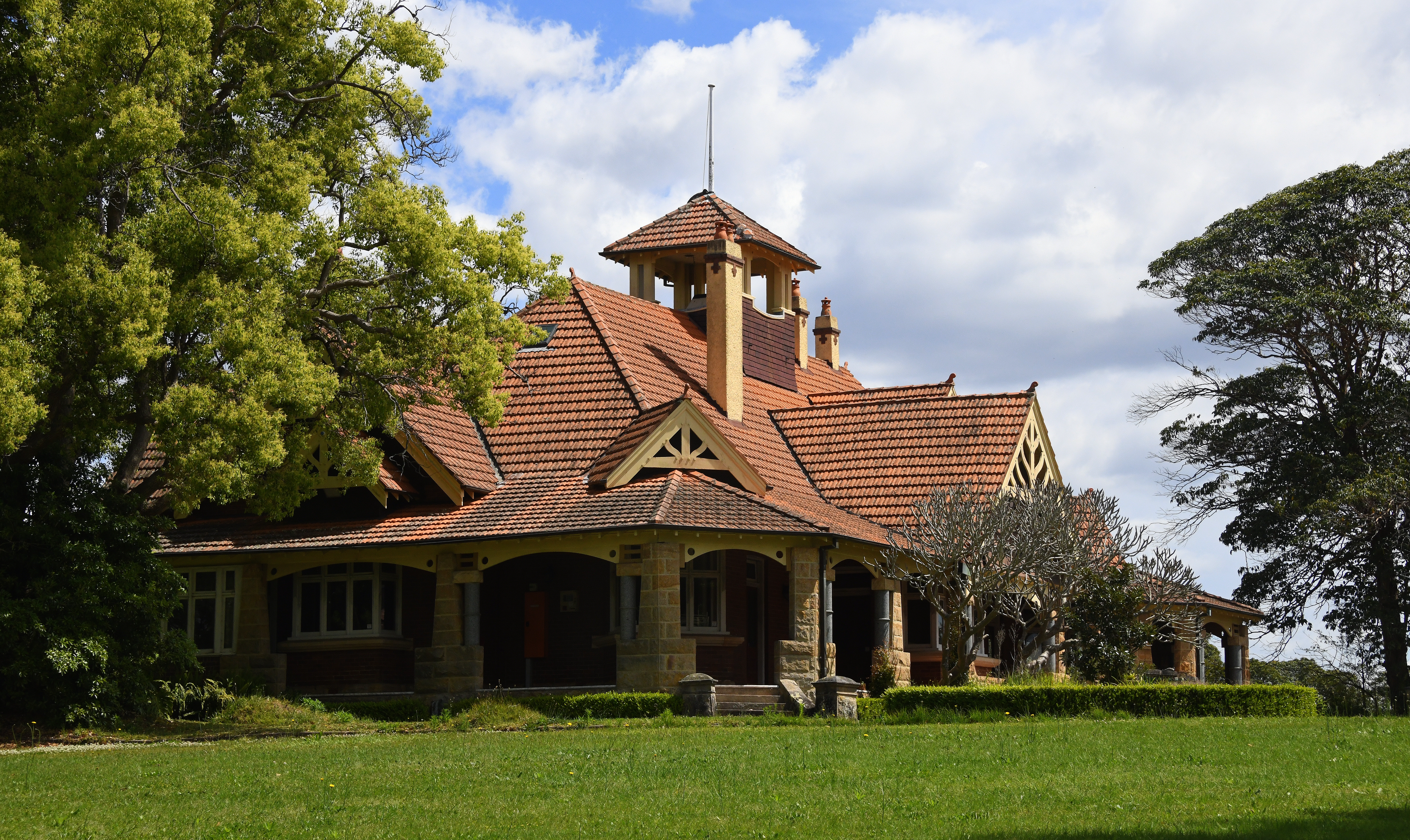
Mount Wilga House, Hornsby. Completed in 1914

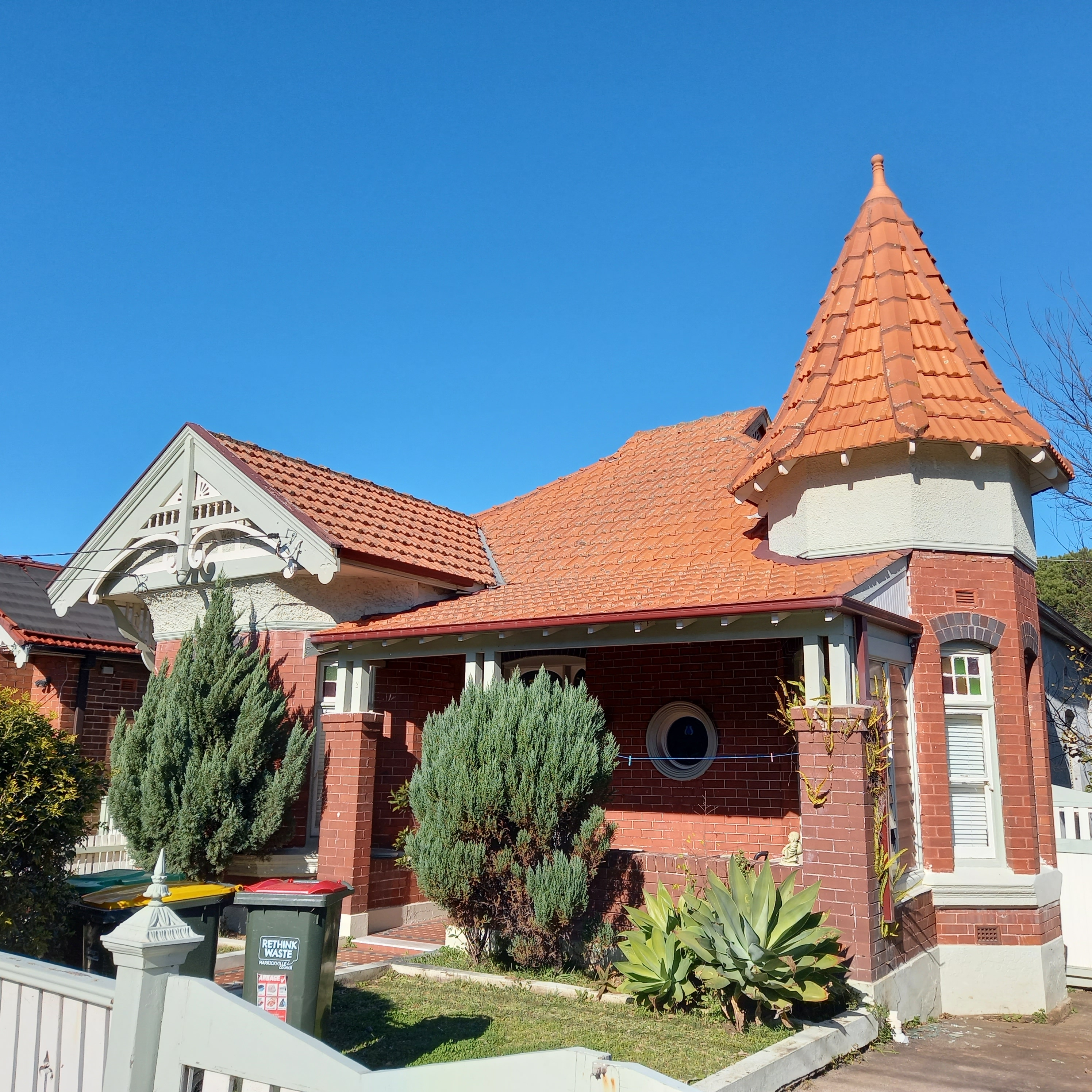
Carlotta, Marrickville. Completed 1909.

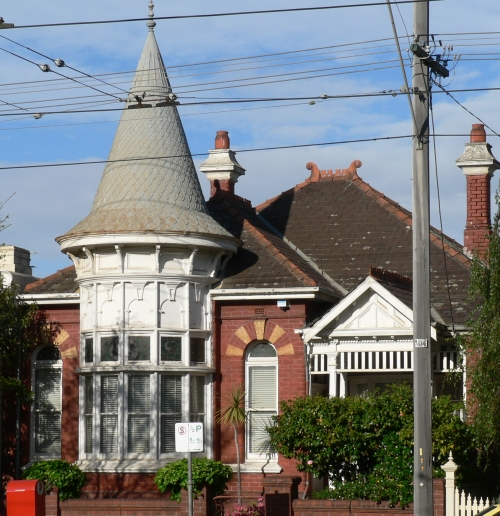
Edwardian home in Albert Park

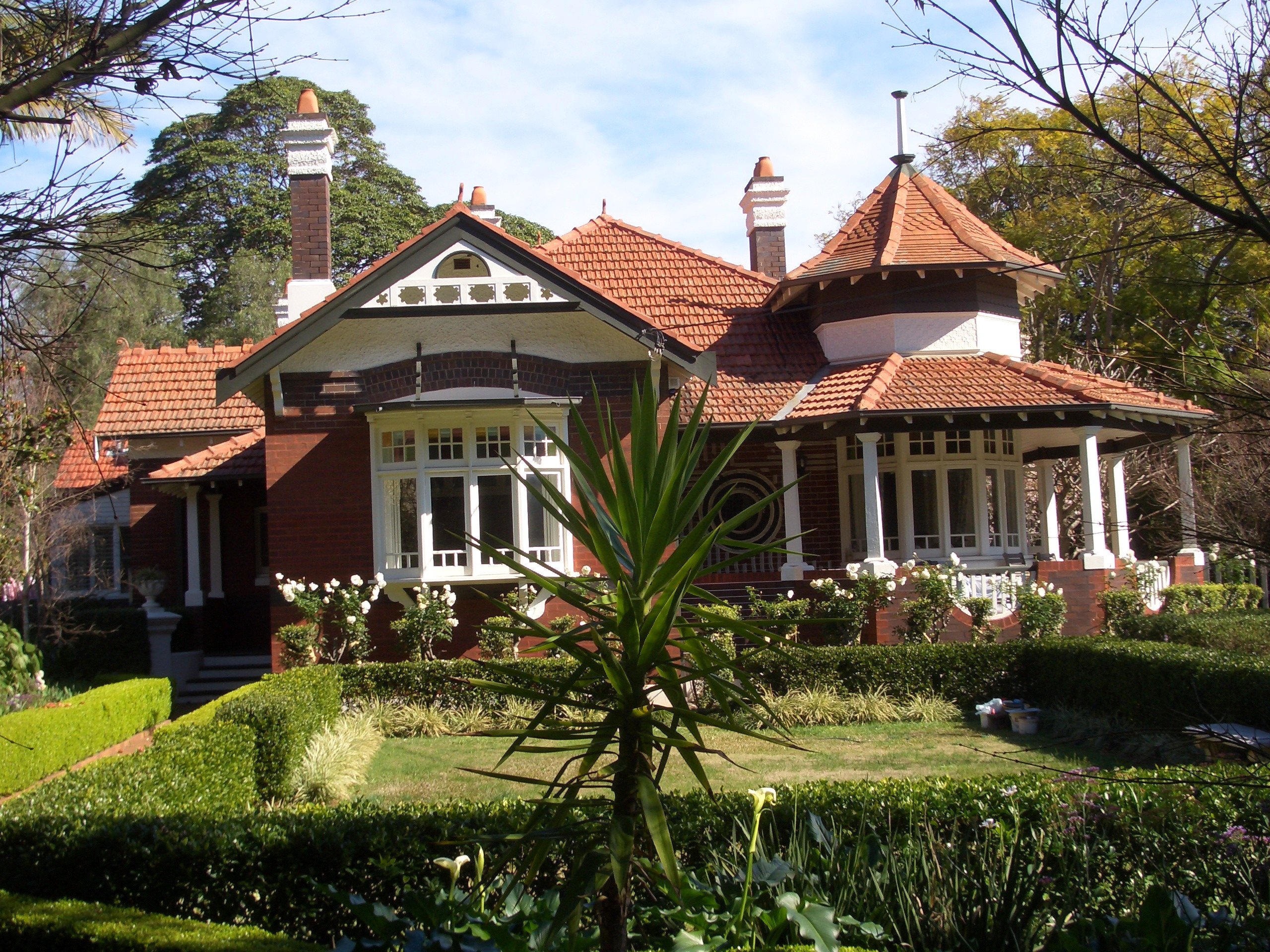
Alba Longa in the Appian Way, Burwood

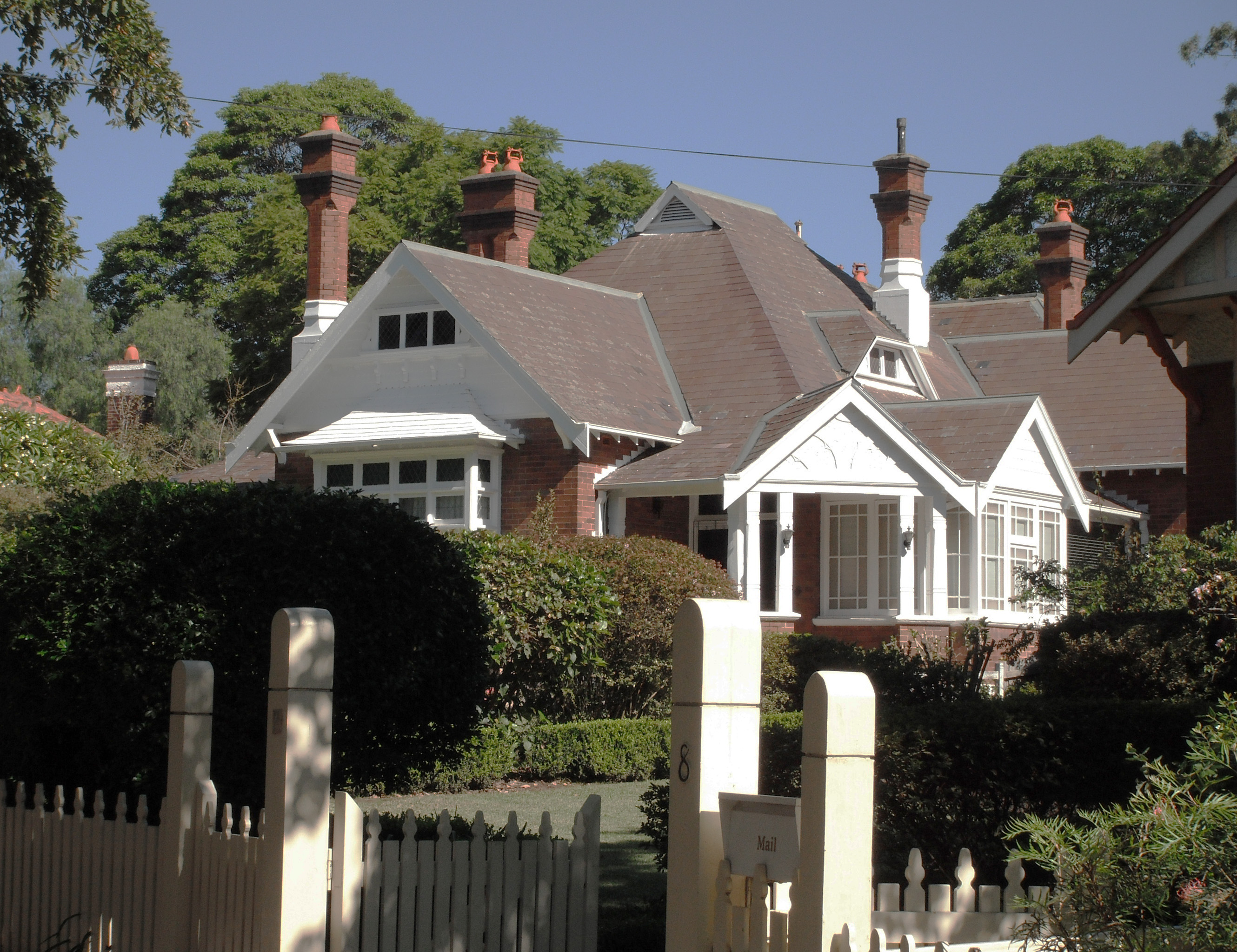
Olevanus in Burwood

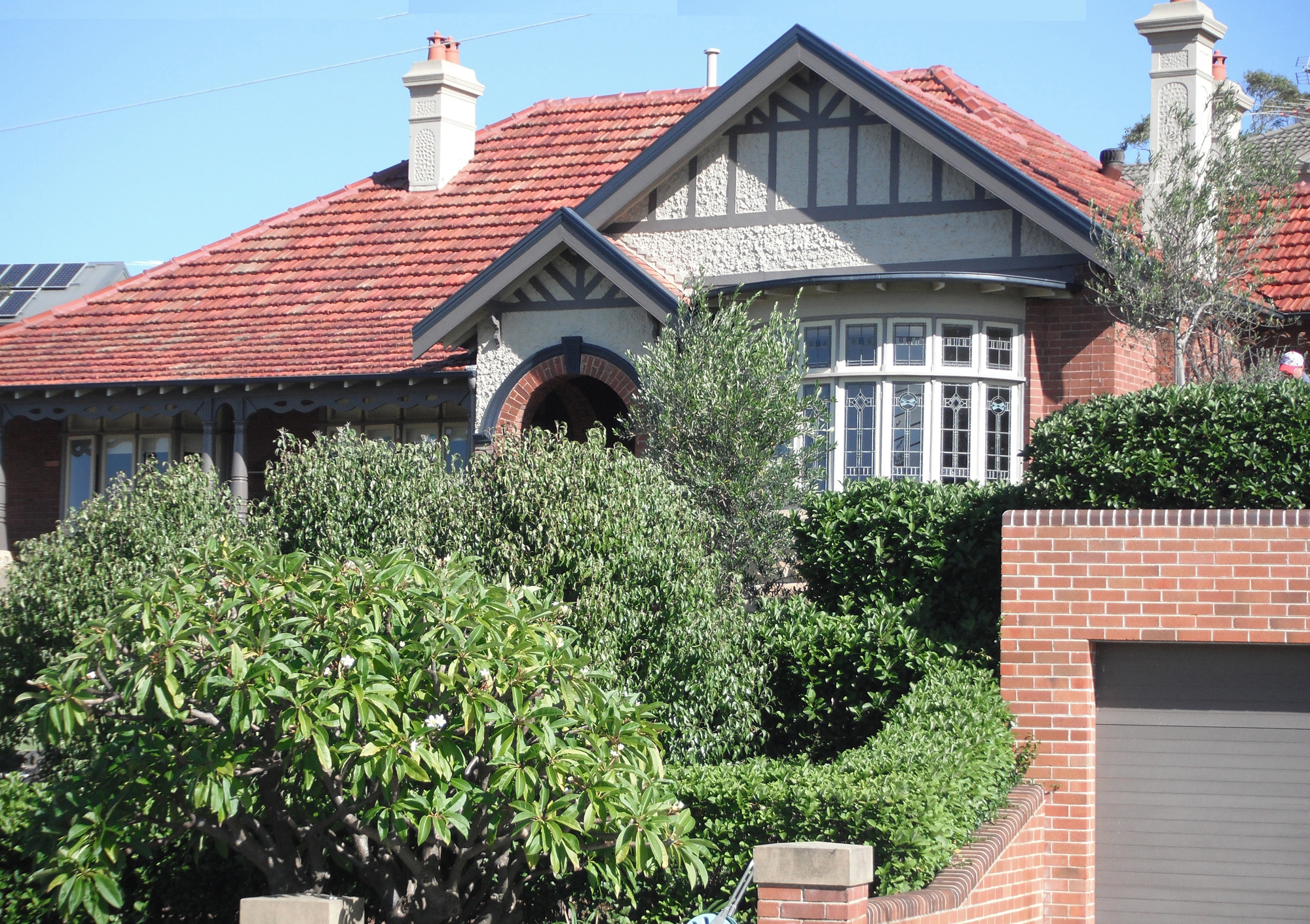
Residence in Coogee

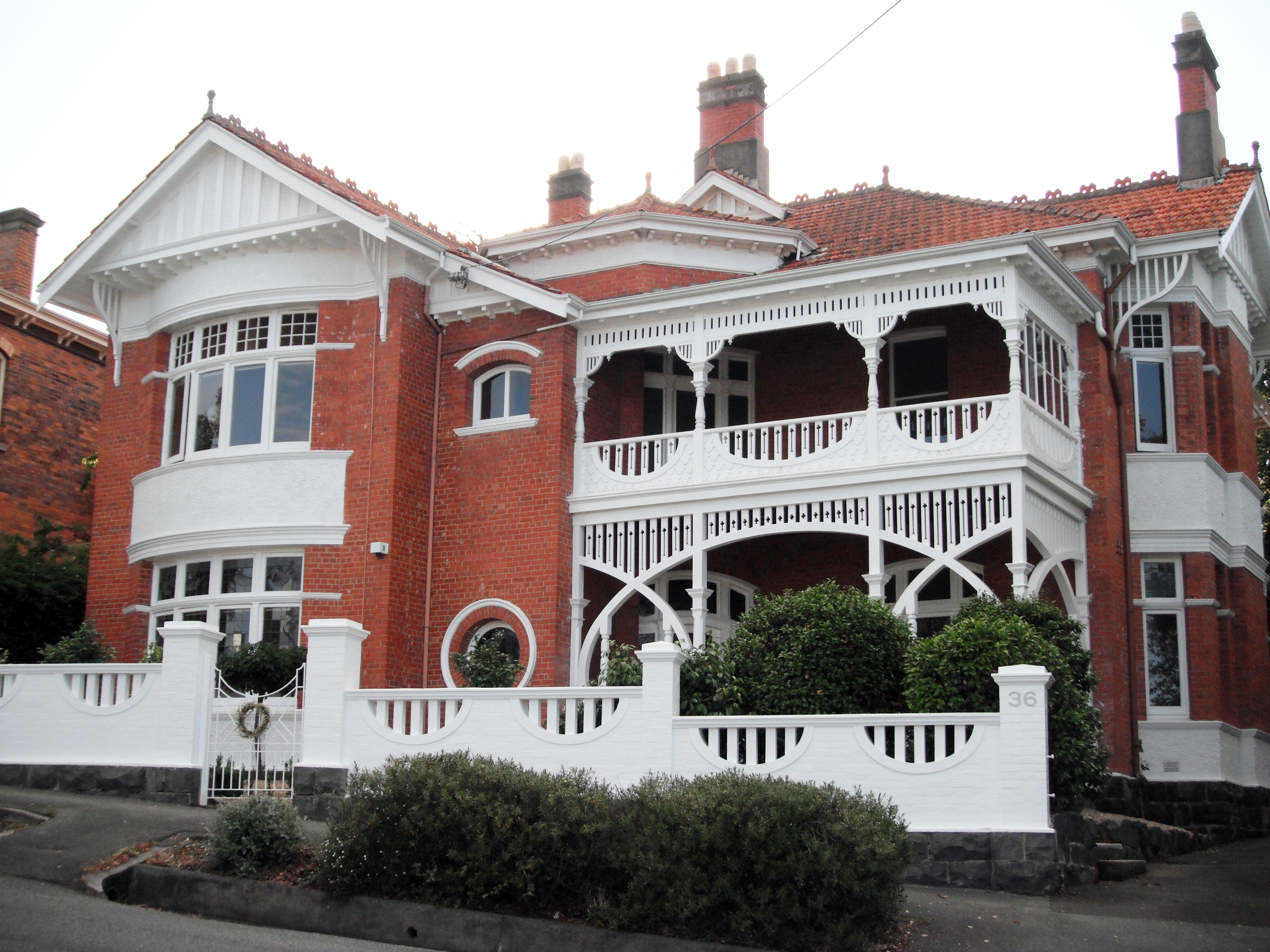
House, Launceston. A combination of Queen Anne and Art Nouveau motifs.

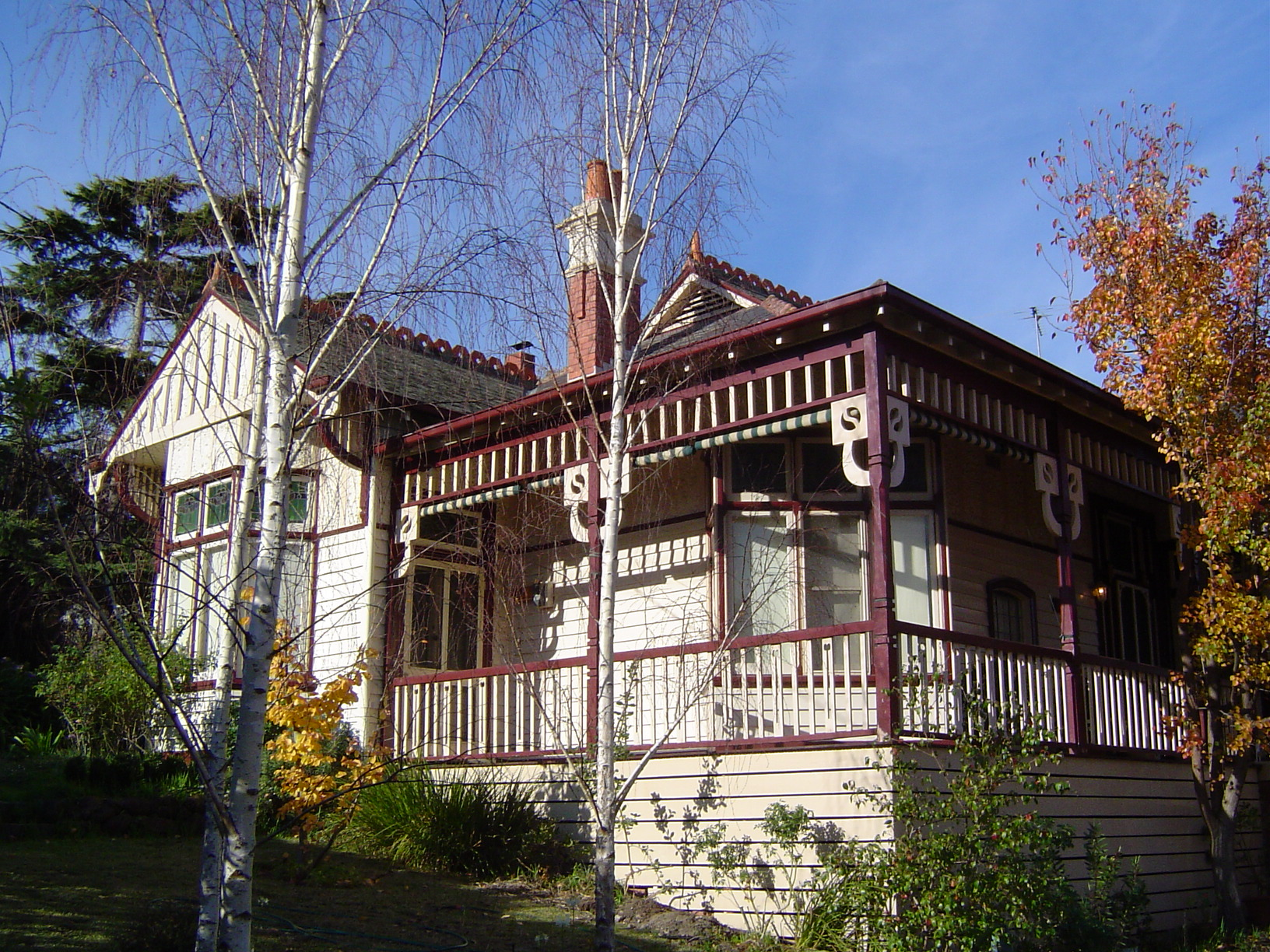
Edwardian house, Heidelberg

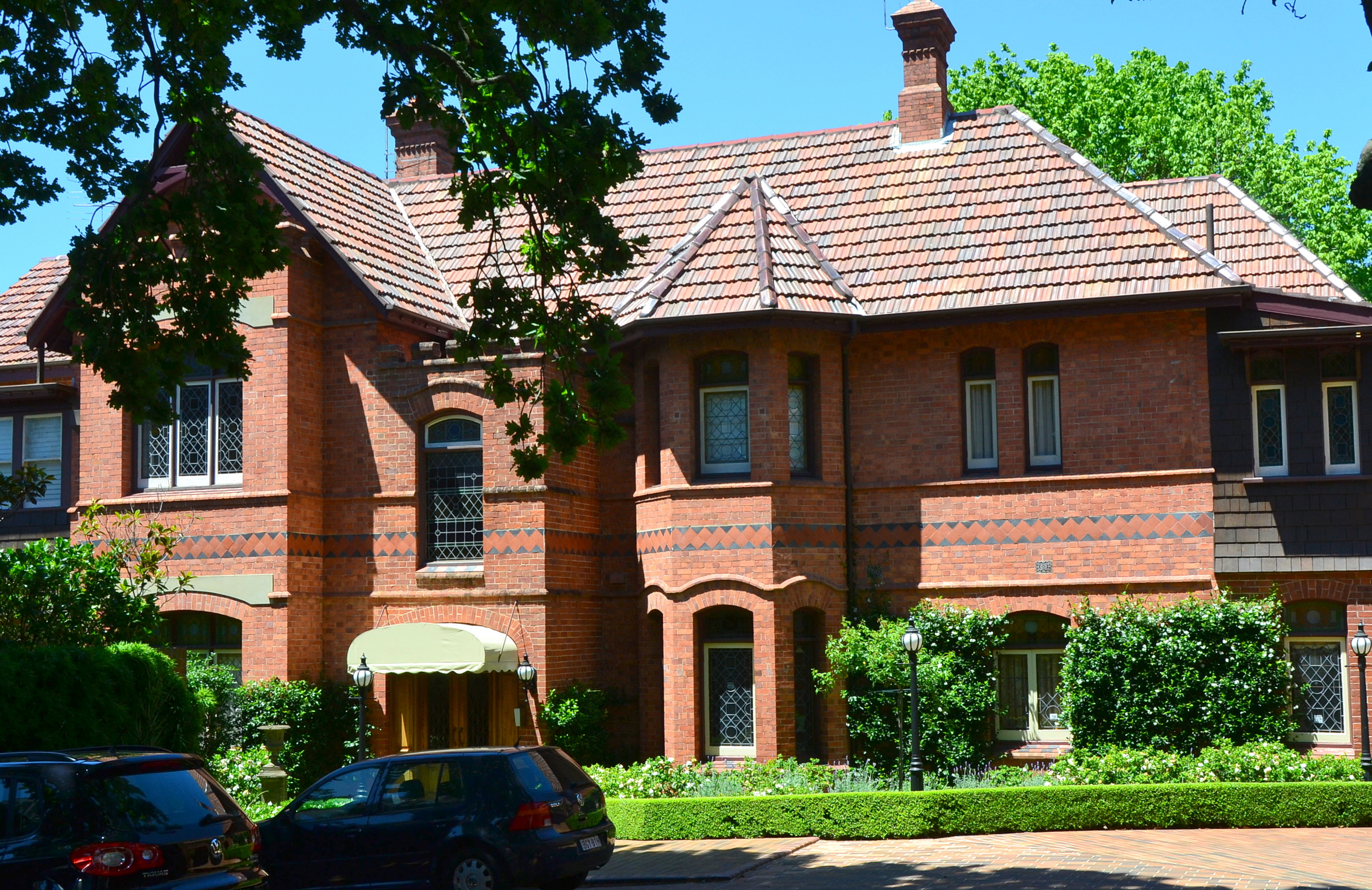
The Annery, Darling Point

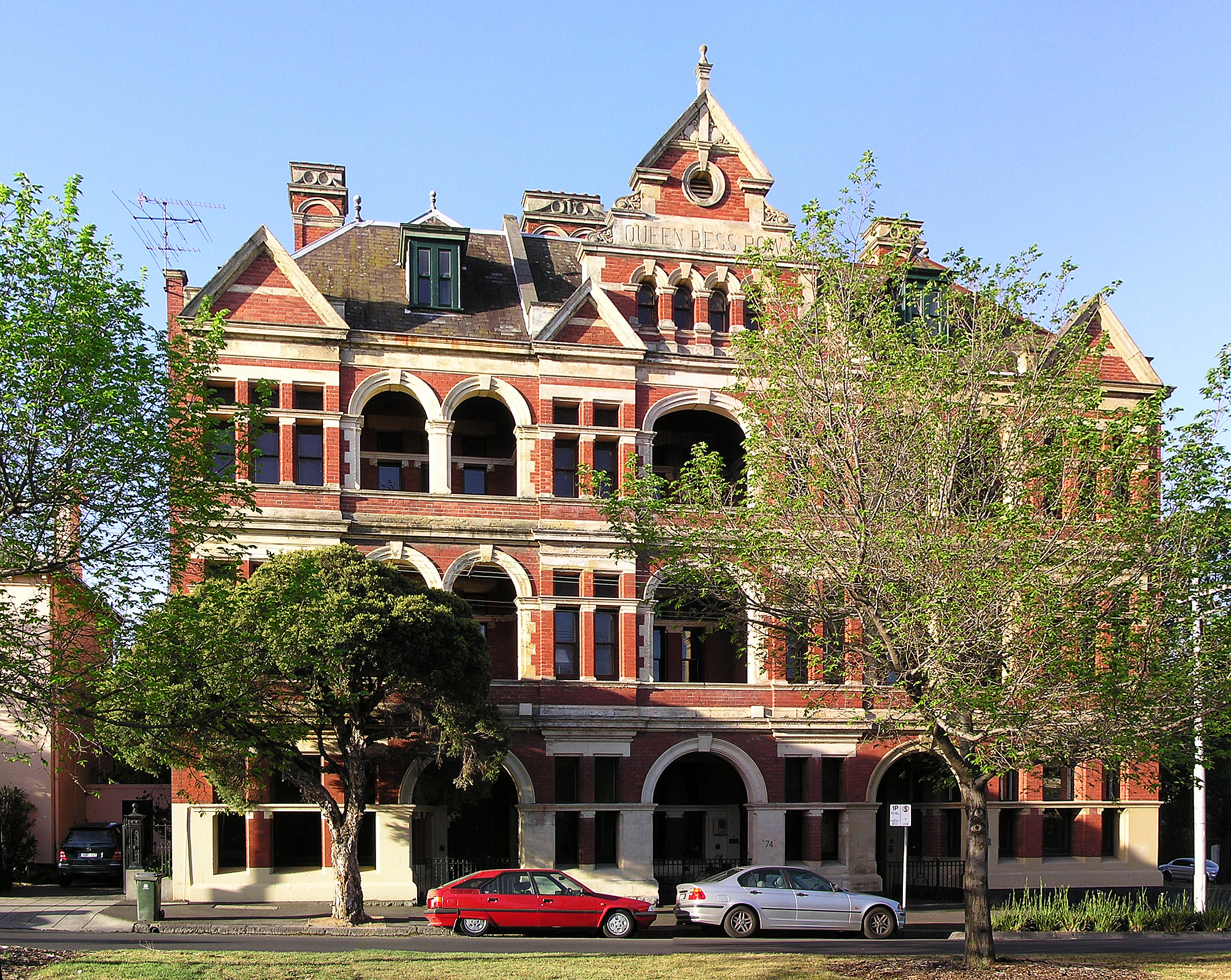
Queen Bess Row in East Melbourne, the largest Queen Anne-styled terrace in Melbourne

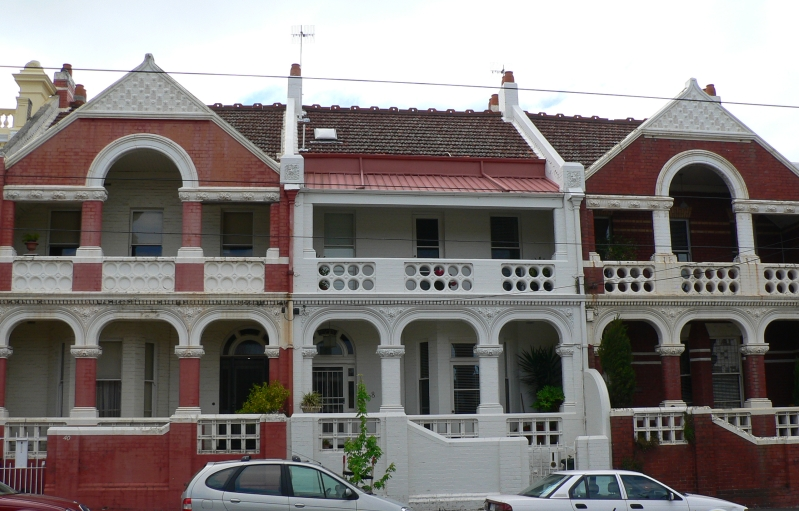
Federation Queen Anne terraces in Park Street, South Yarra

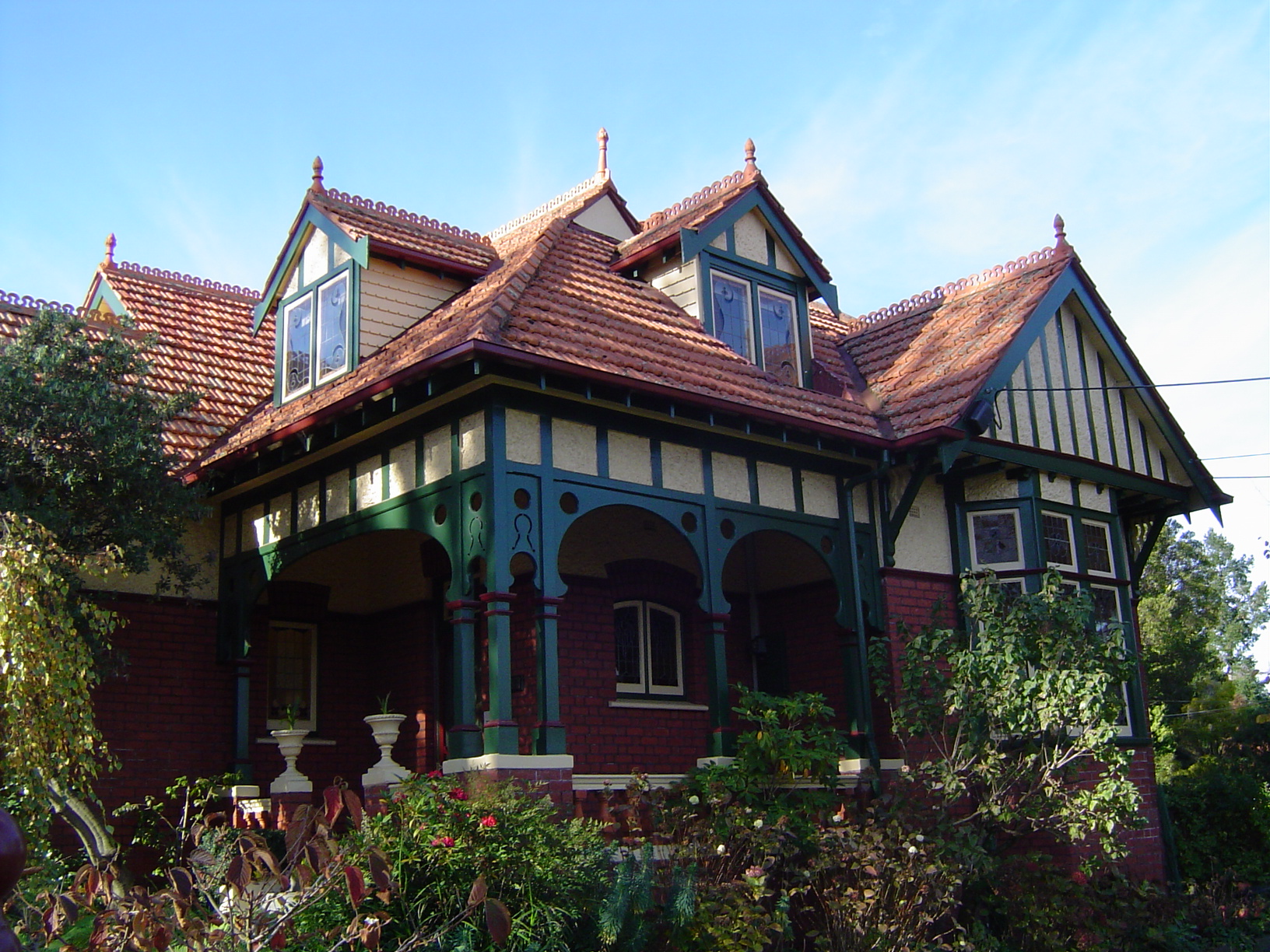
A Queen Anne residence in Ivanhoe

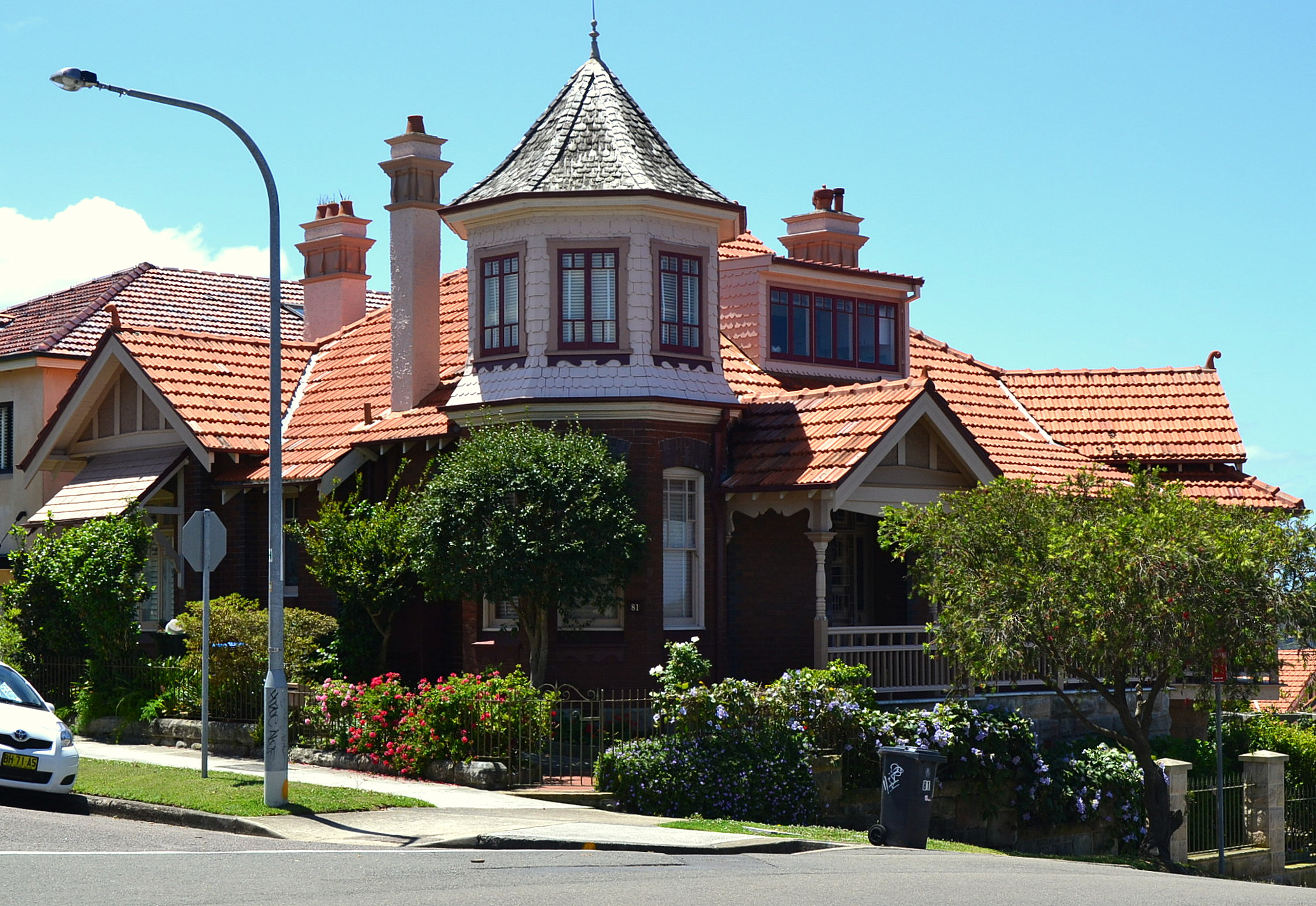
House in Mosman

==== Federation Arts and Crafts ====
The Arts and Crafts style came out of a movement to get away from mass-production and rediscover the human touch and the hand-made. The architectural style was characterised by rough-cast walls, shingles, faceted bay windows, stone bases, tall chimneys, high-pitched roofs and overhanging eaves. It was widely used in Australia during the Federation period.

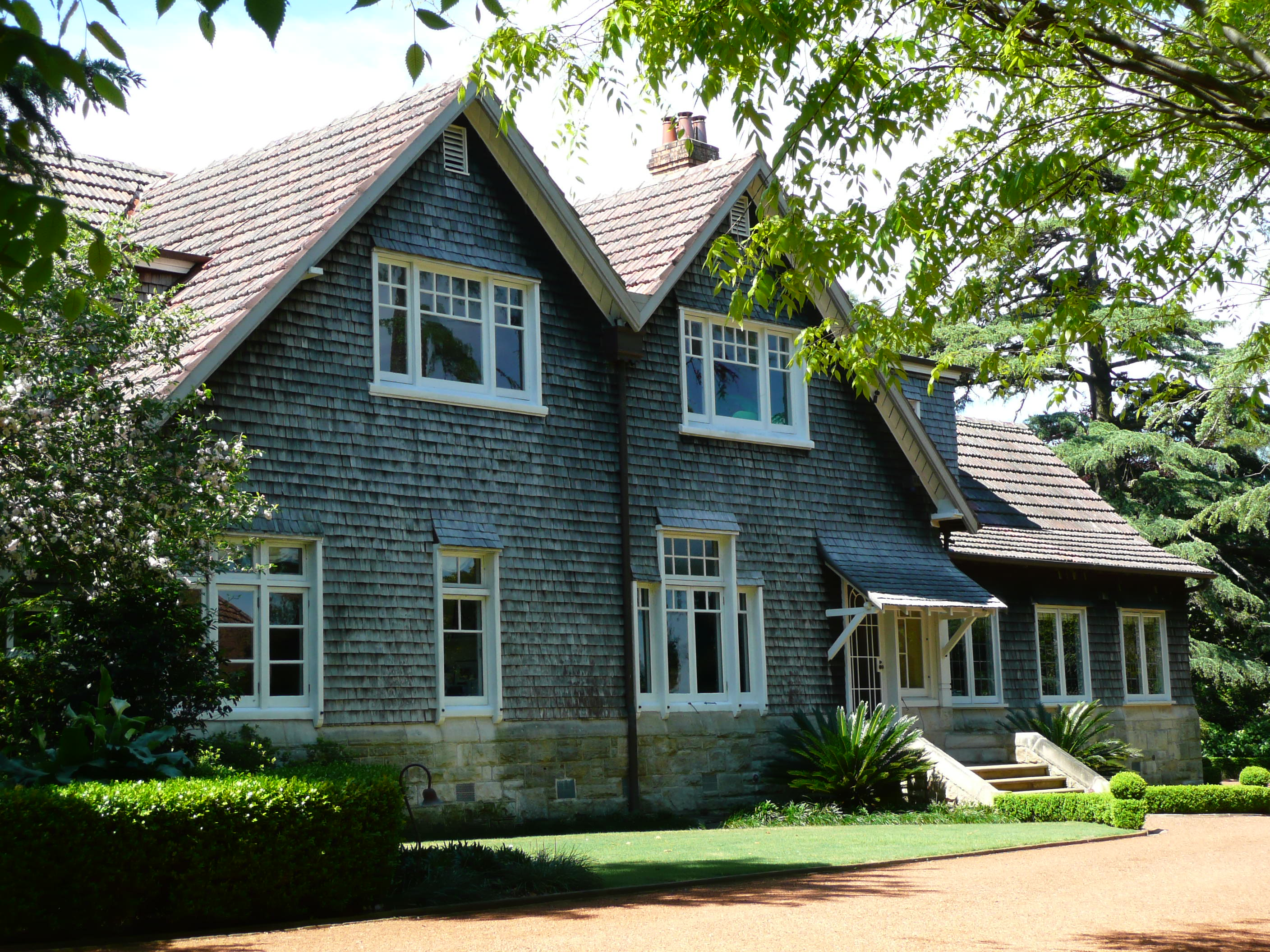
Pibrac, Warrawee; built 1888; architect, John Horbury Hunt.

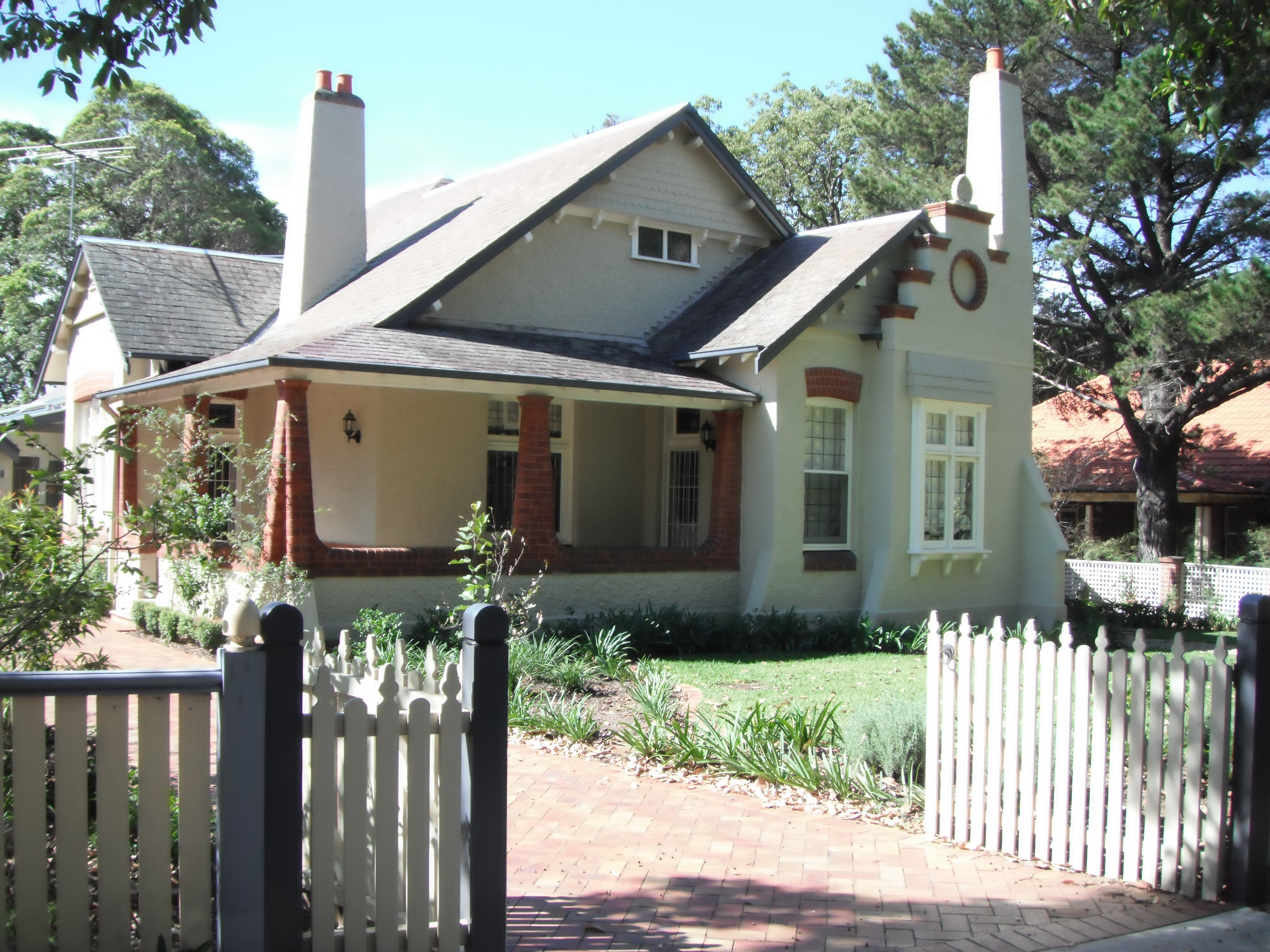
Erica, Appian Way, Burwood, built 1908. William Richards, builder and designer.

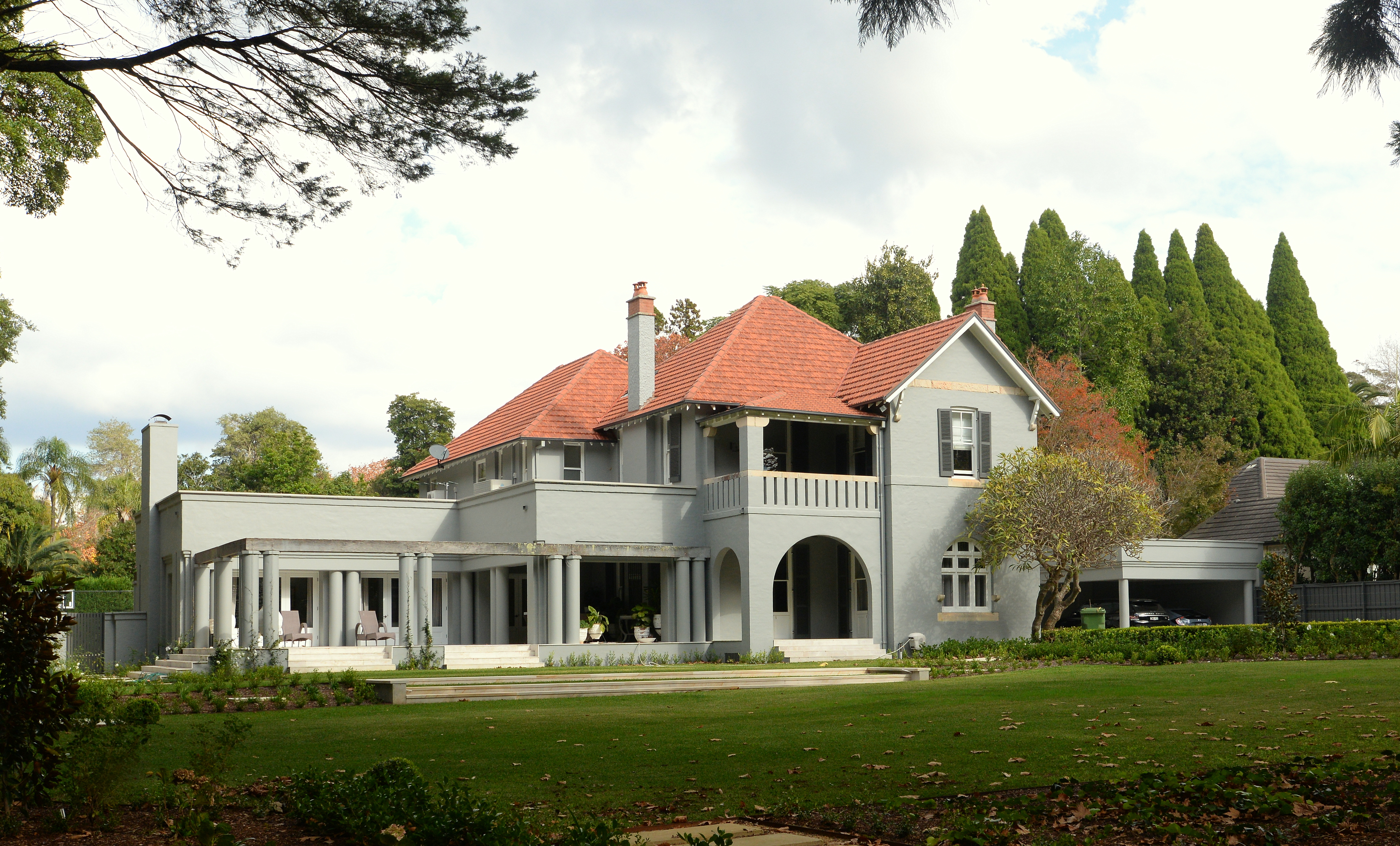
Residence in Wahroonga

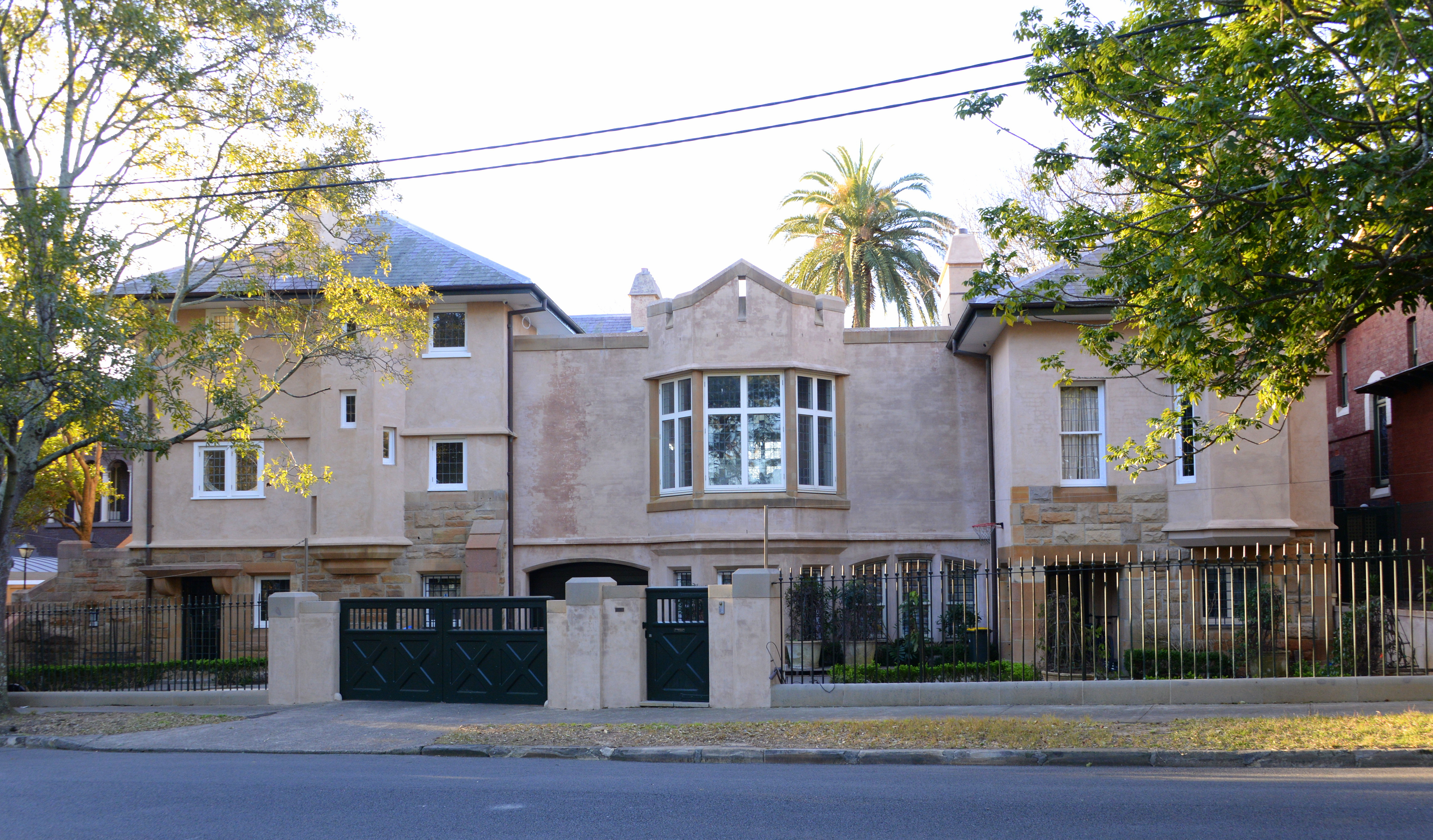
The Crossways, Centennial Park; completed 1908; architect, B. J. Waterhouse.

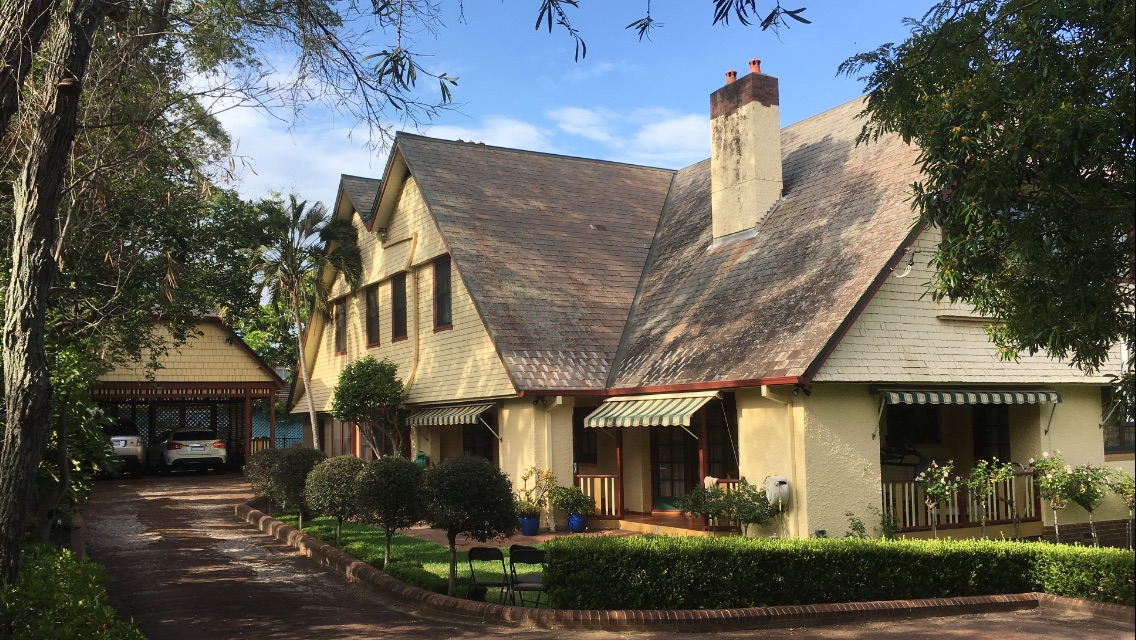
Kama, Strathfield; built 1911–1913; architect, Thomas Pollard Sampson.

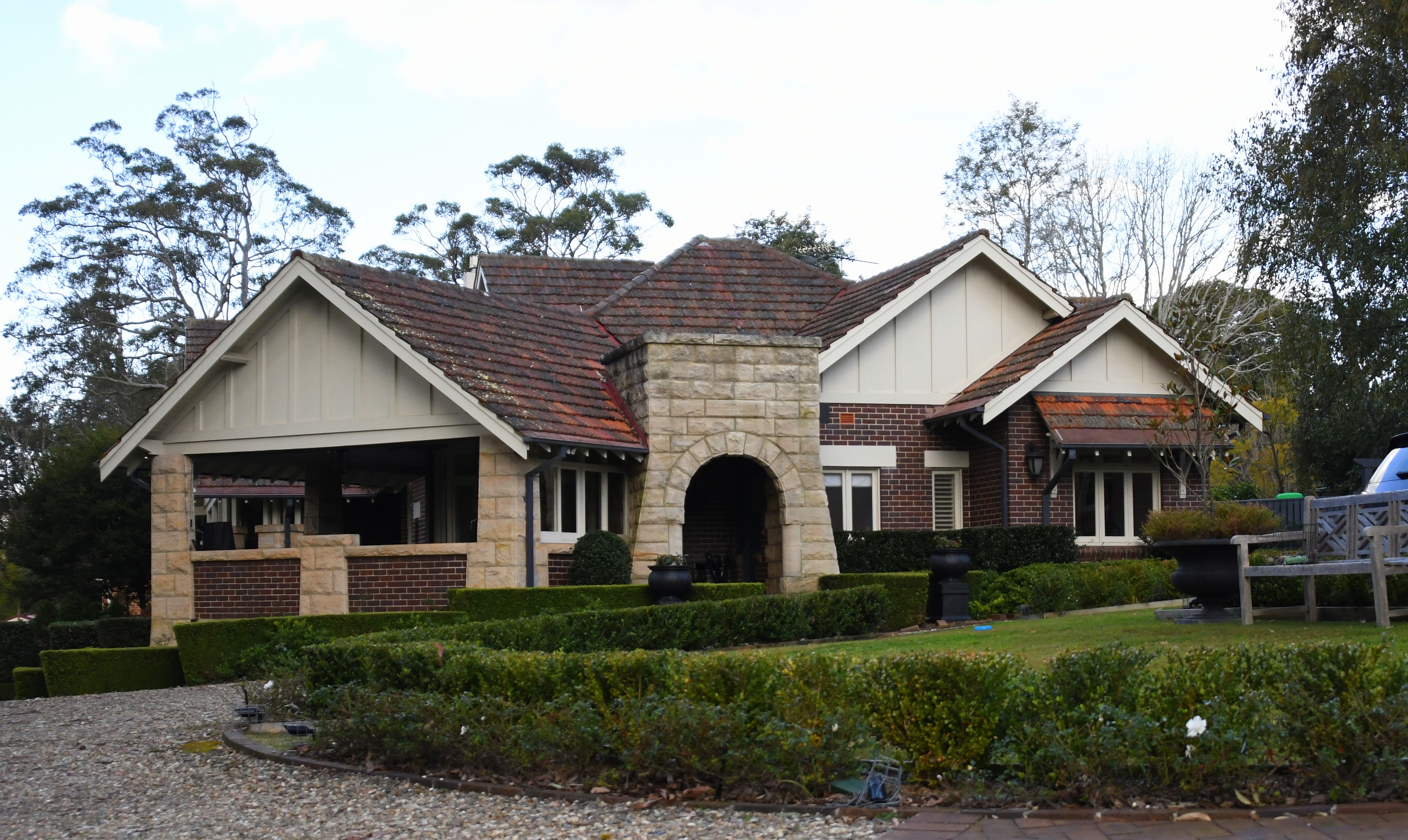
Residence in Hornsby

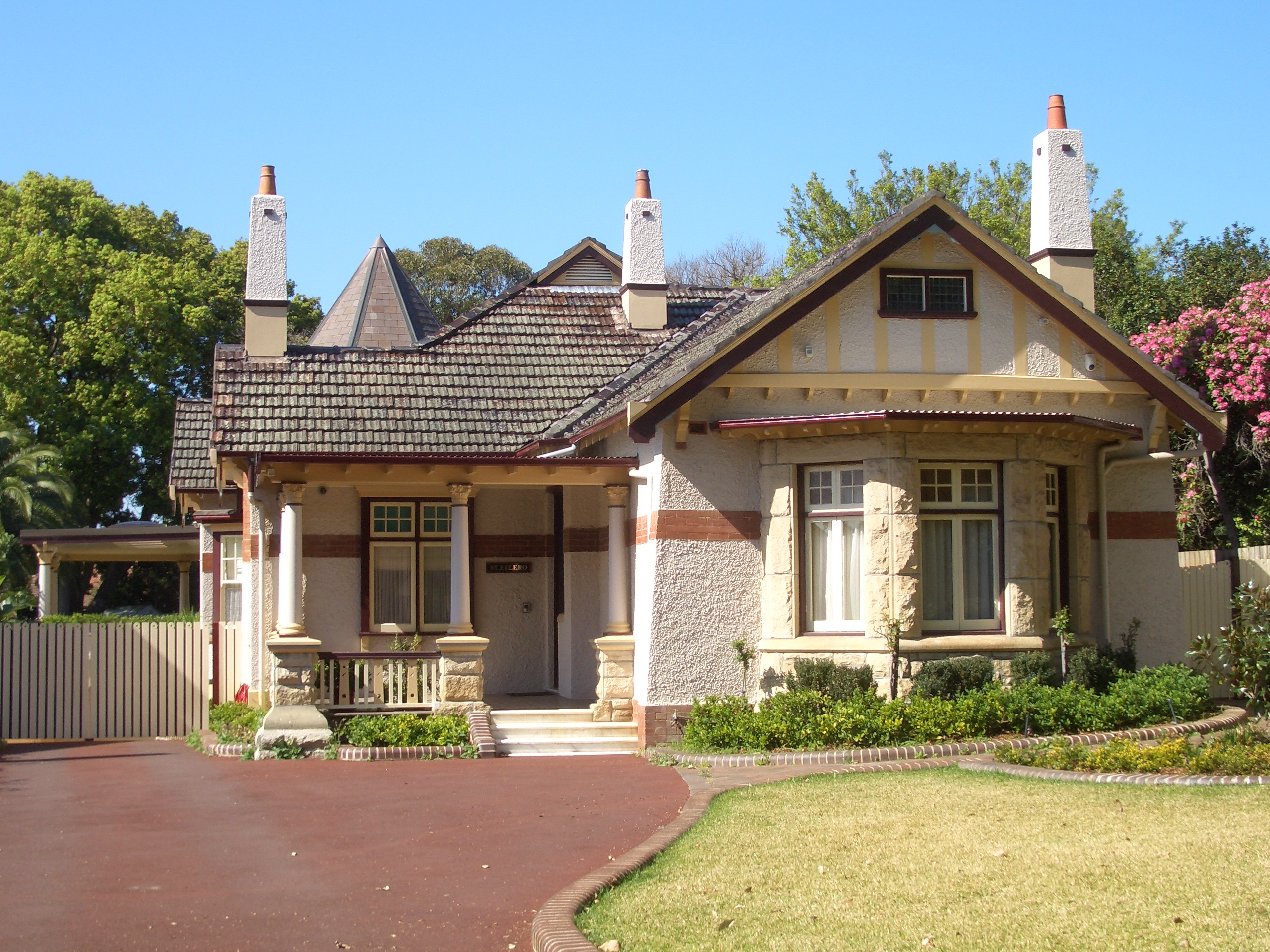
St Ellero, Appian Way, Burwood, built c.1912-15. William Richards, builder and designer.

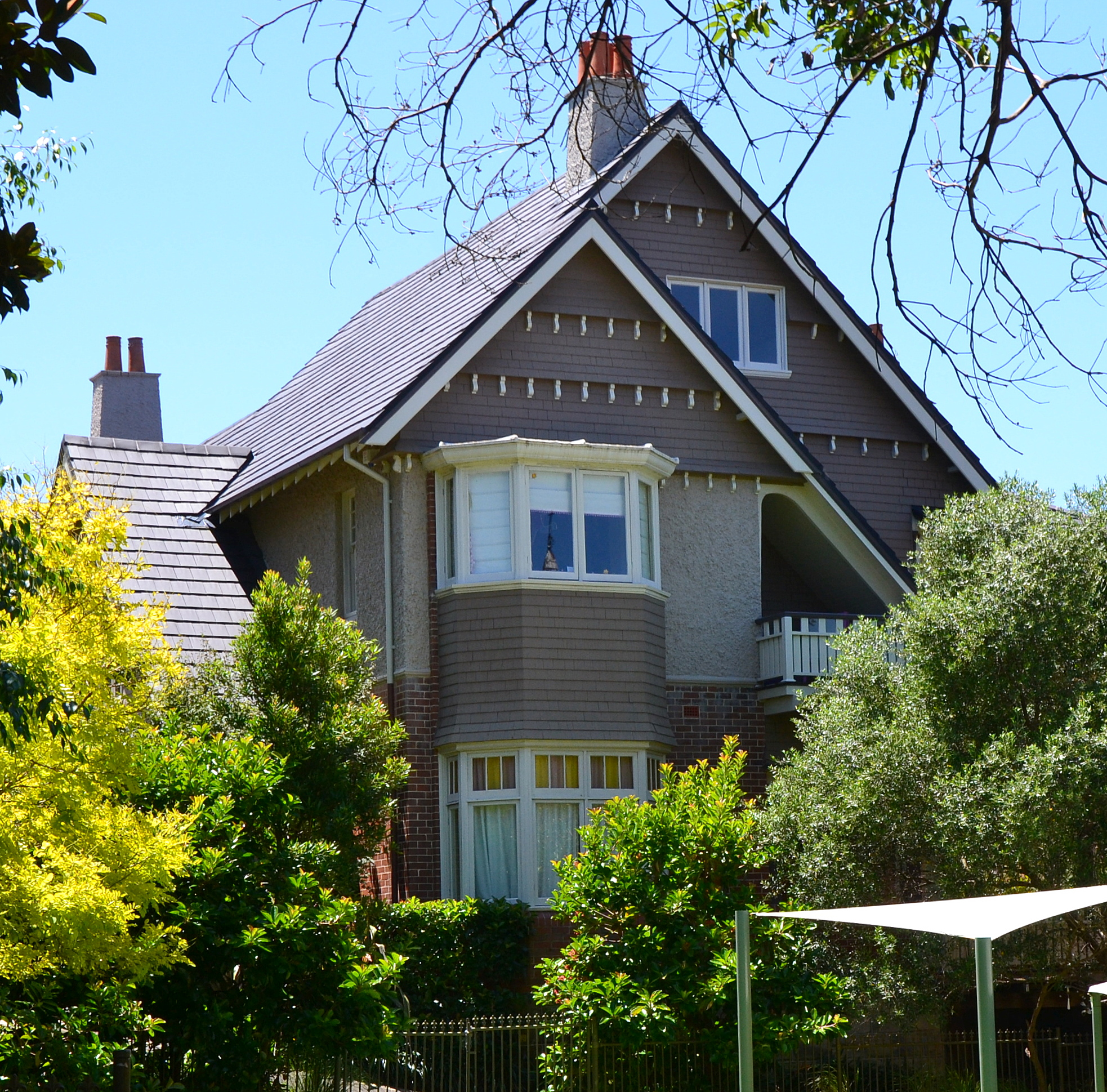
St Ange, Neutral Bay, 1918. B.J. Waterhouse, architect.

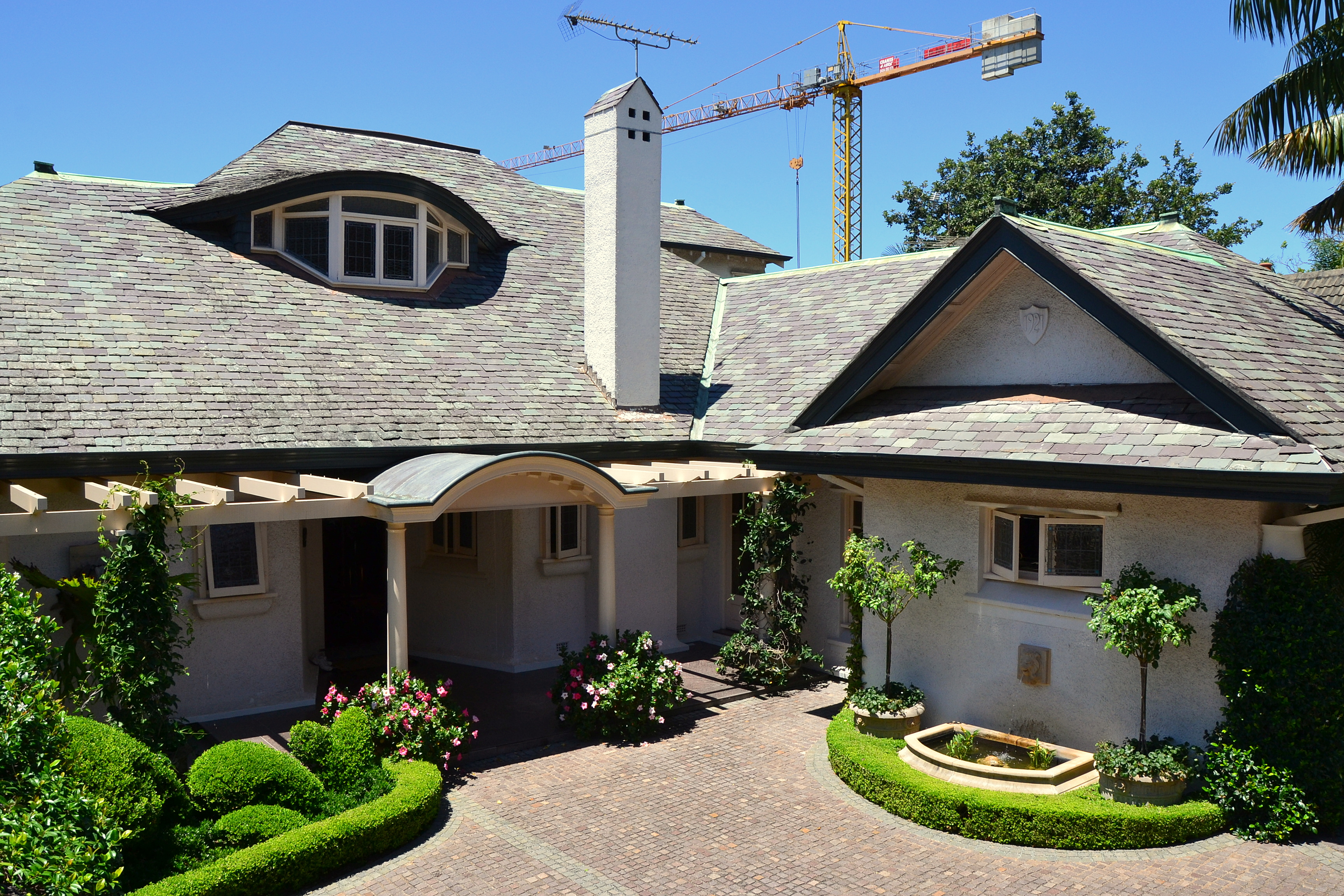
Keynsham, Neutral Bay; built 1921; Frank Buckle, architect.

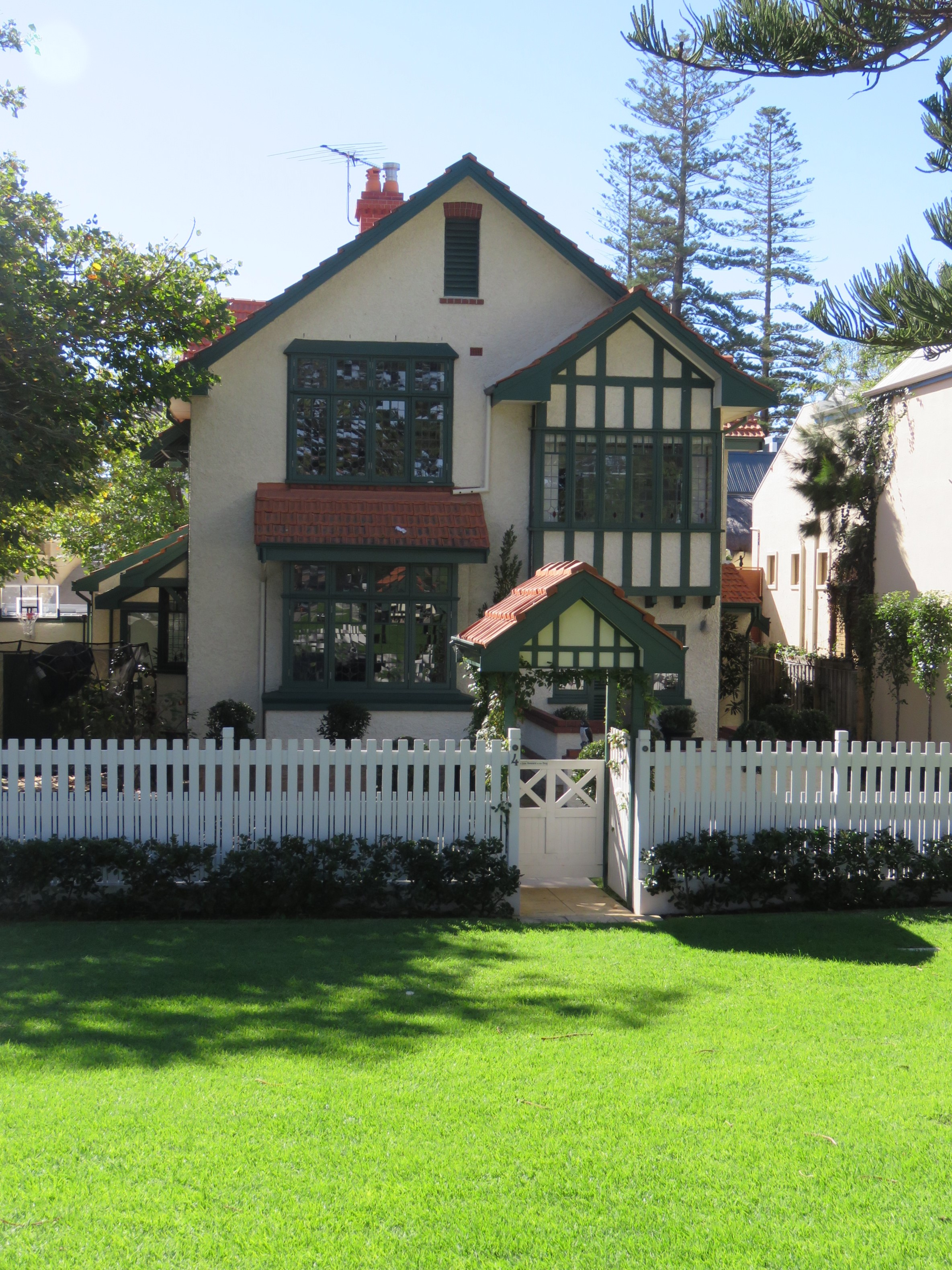
Kulahea, Cottesloe; built 1922; architect, George Thomas Temple-Poole.

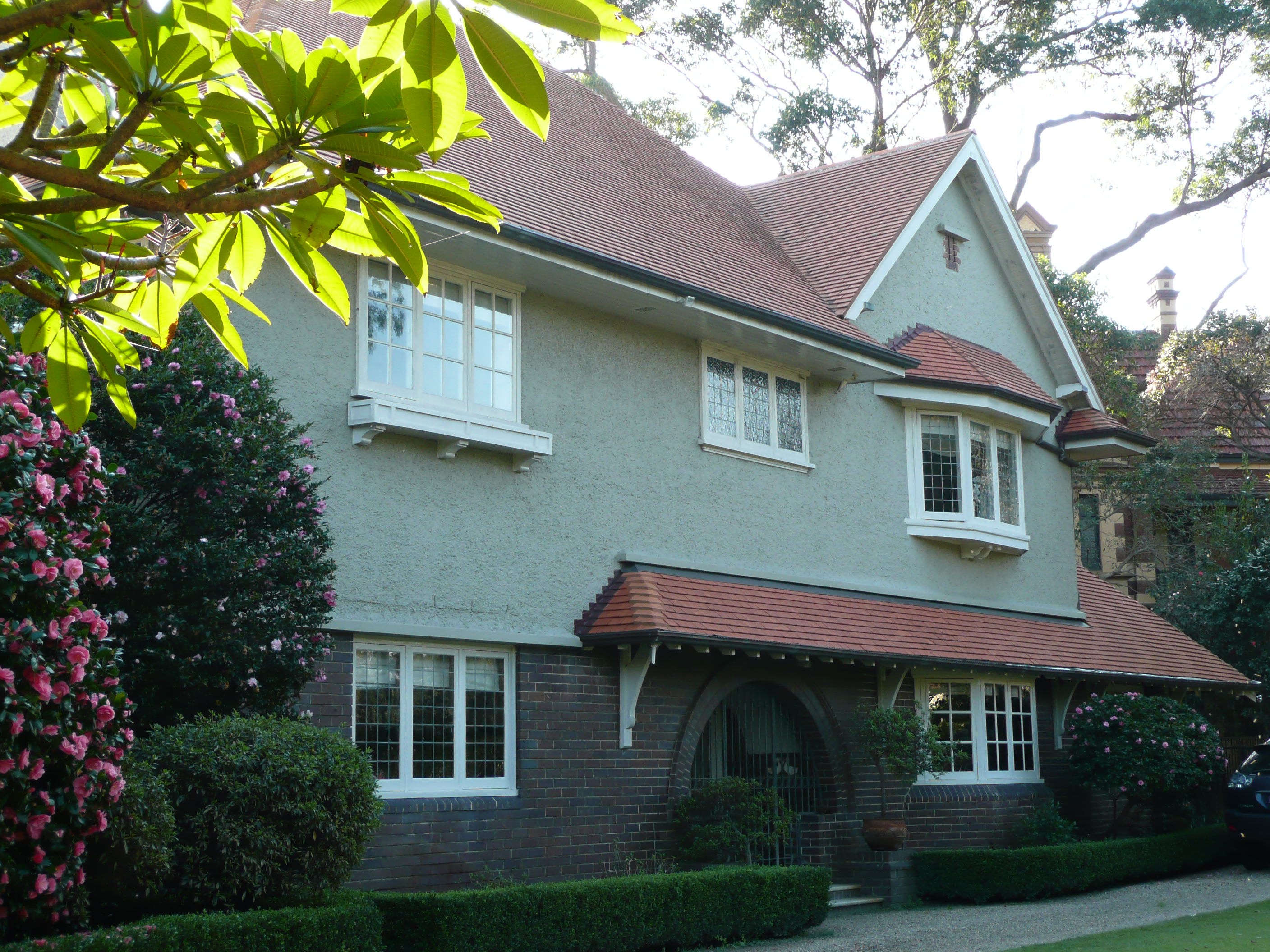
Devon, Centennial Park; built c. 1924; Arthur Leslie Bayley, architect.

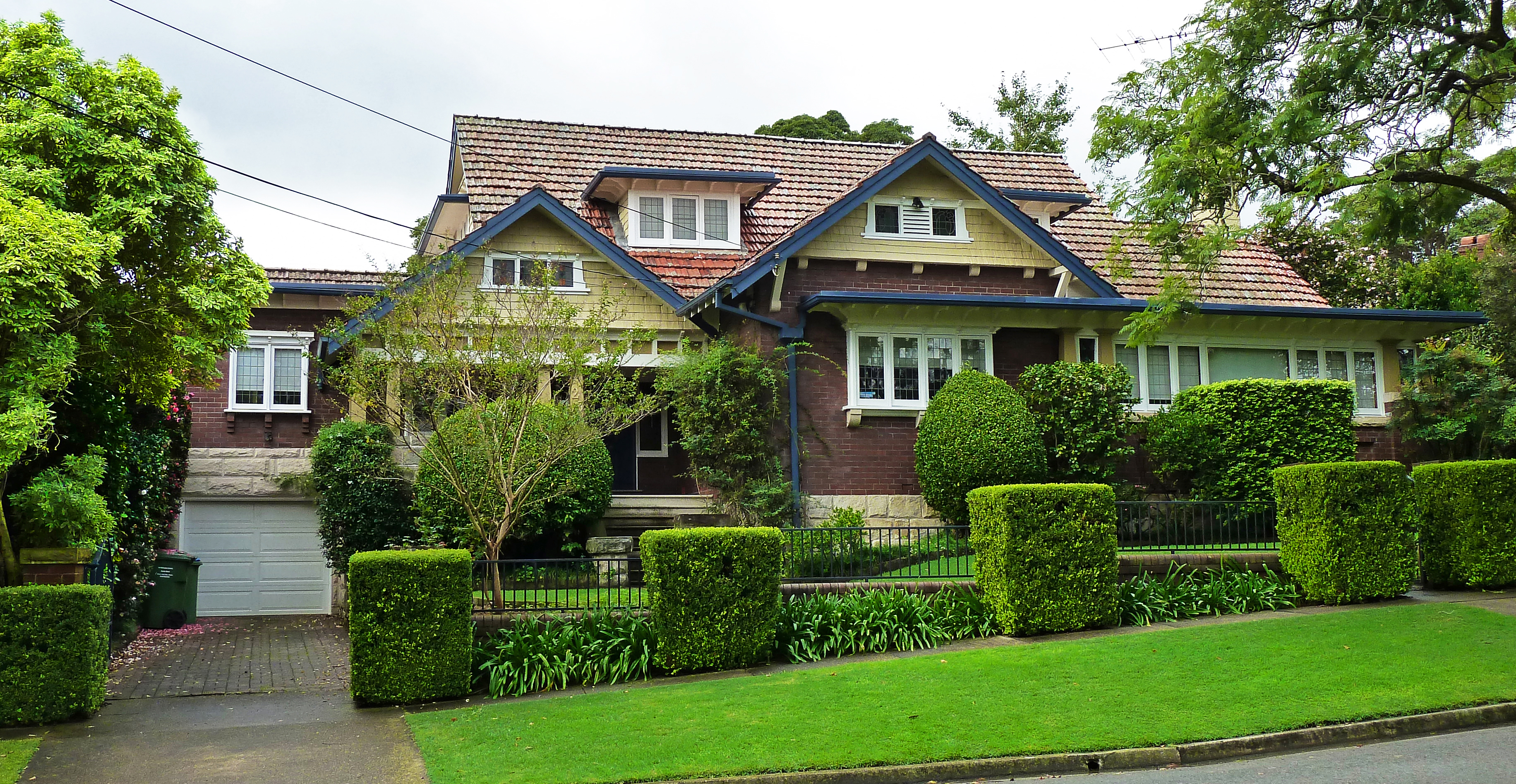
Waimea Road, Lindfield

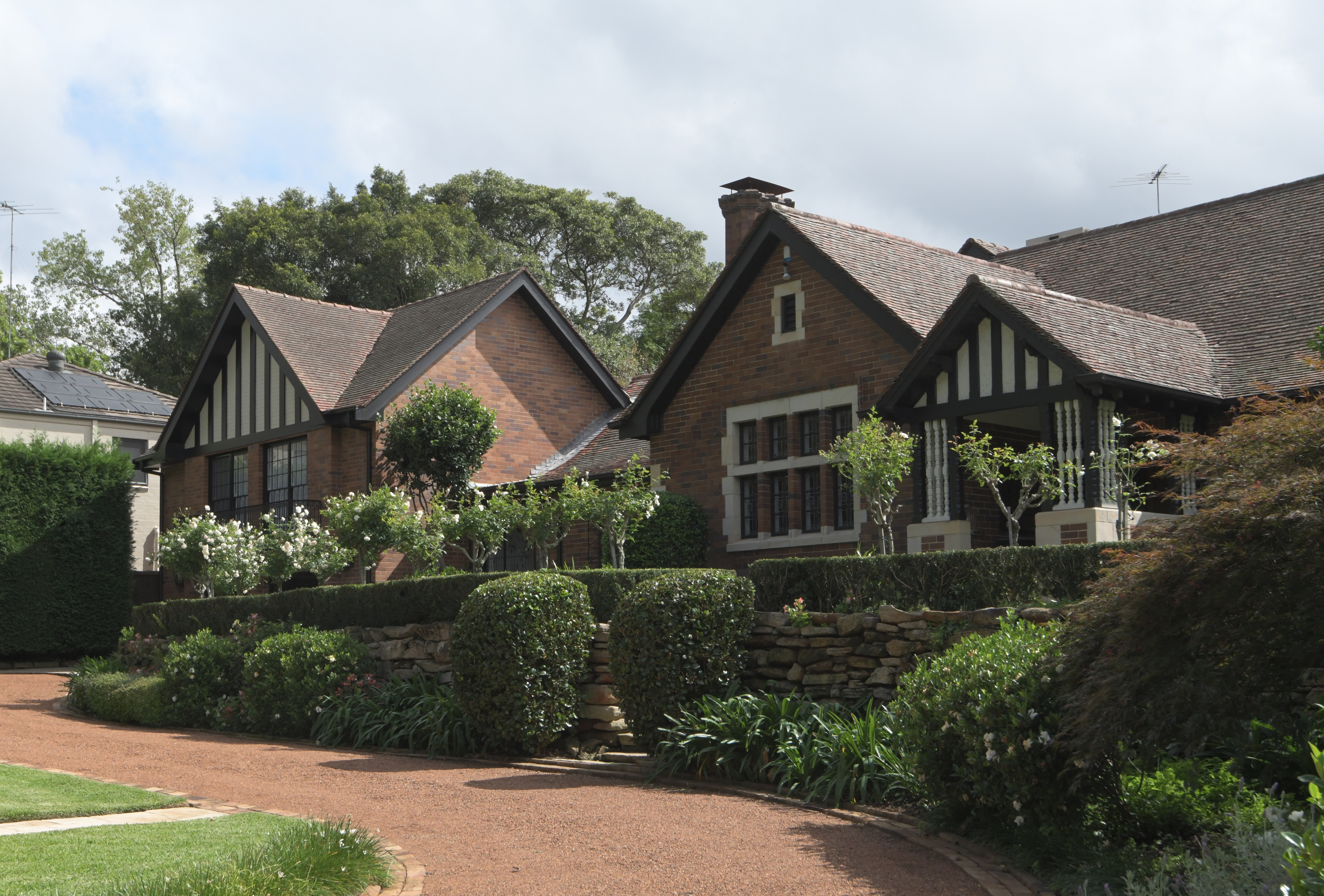
House in Warrawee

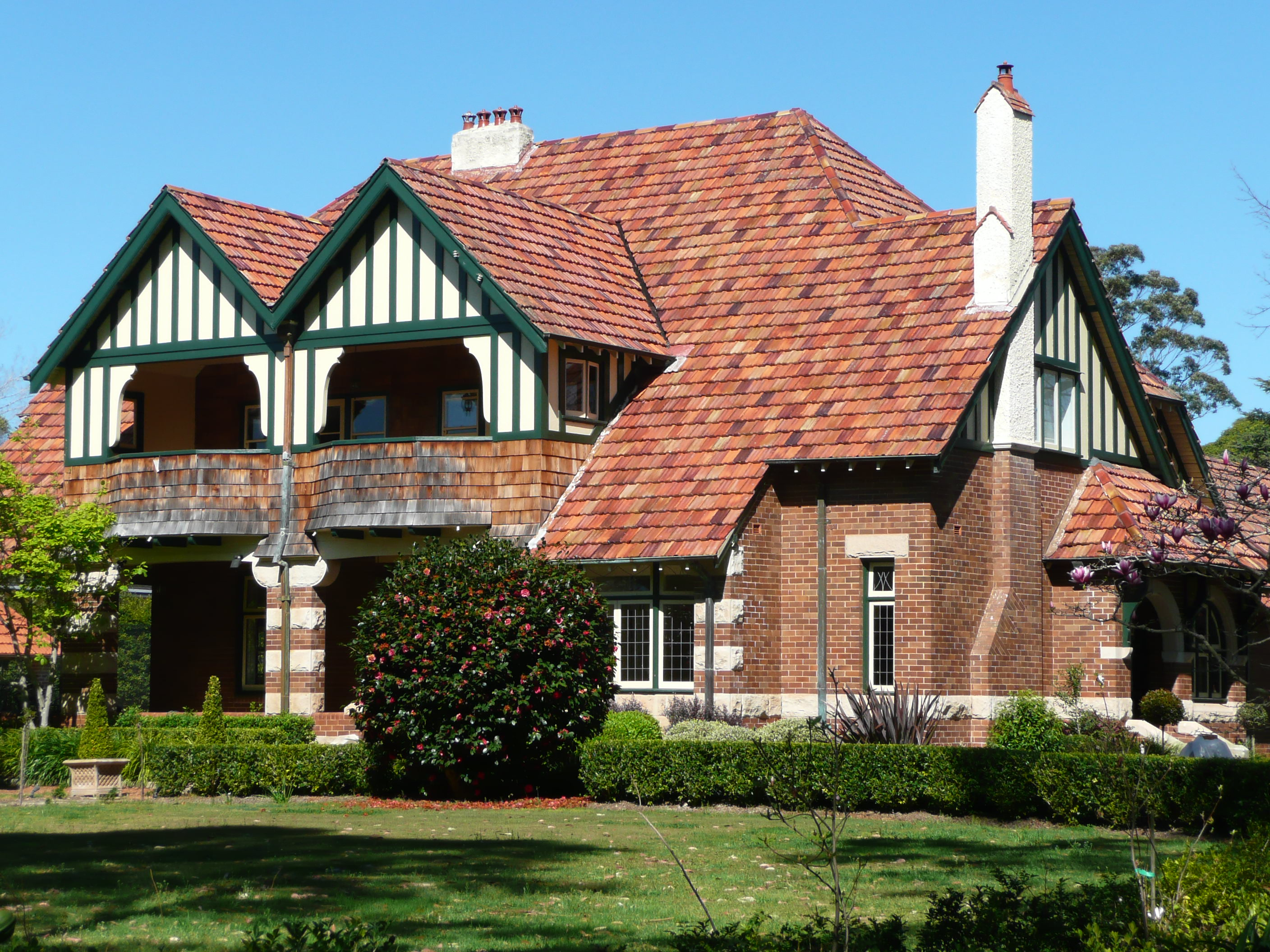
Craignairn, Wahroonga

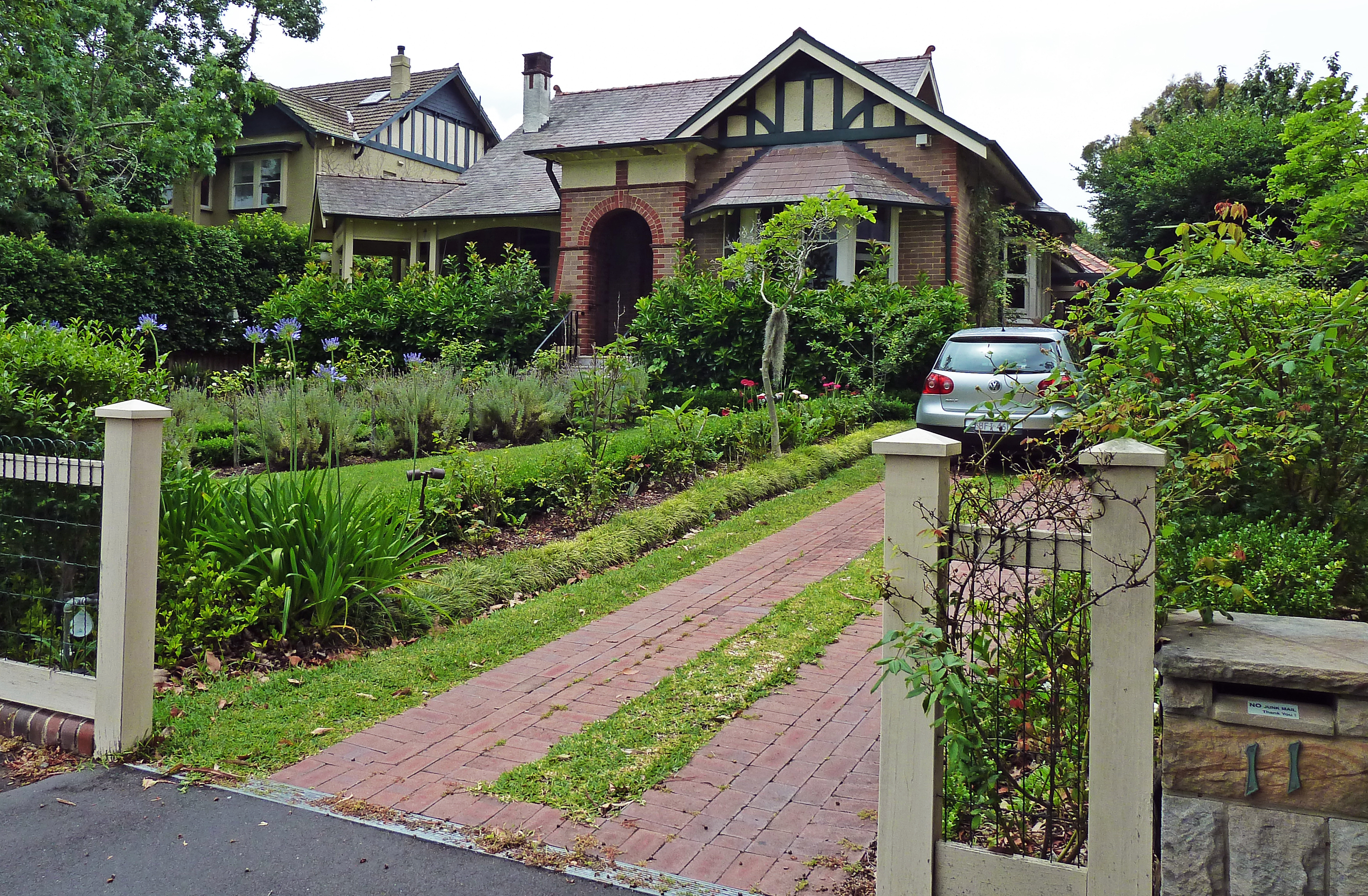
Home, Arnold Street, Killara

==== Federation Bungalow ====
The bungalow style was usually a single-storey house with a prominent verandah, especially with the roof covering the verandah. It is seen as a transition phase between the Federation period and the California bungalow.

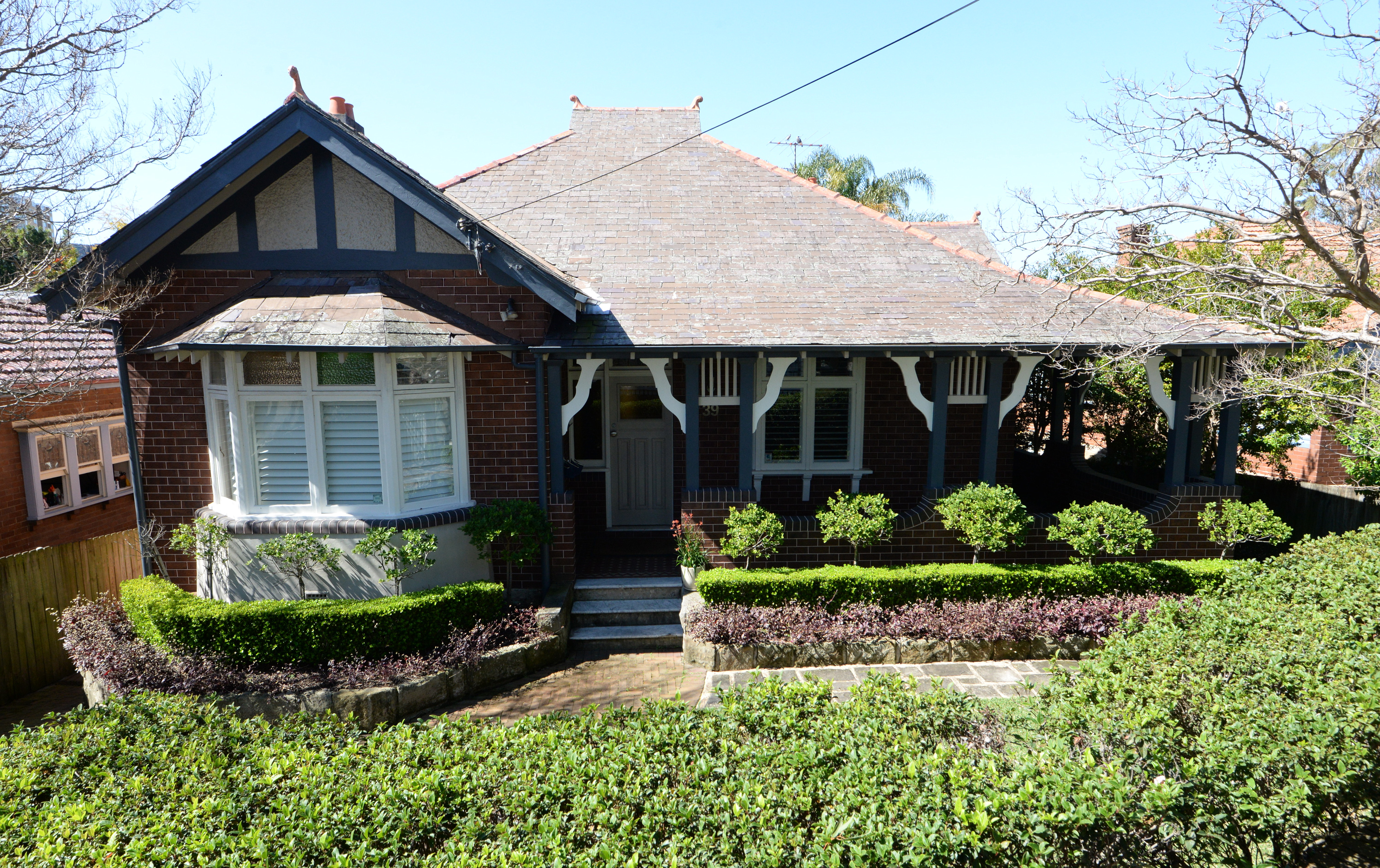
Federation Bungalow house in Waverton

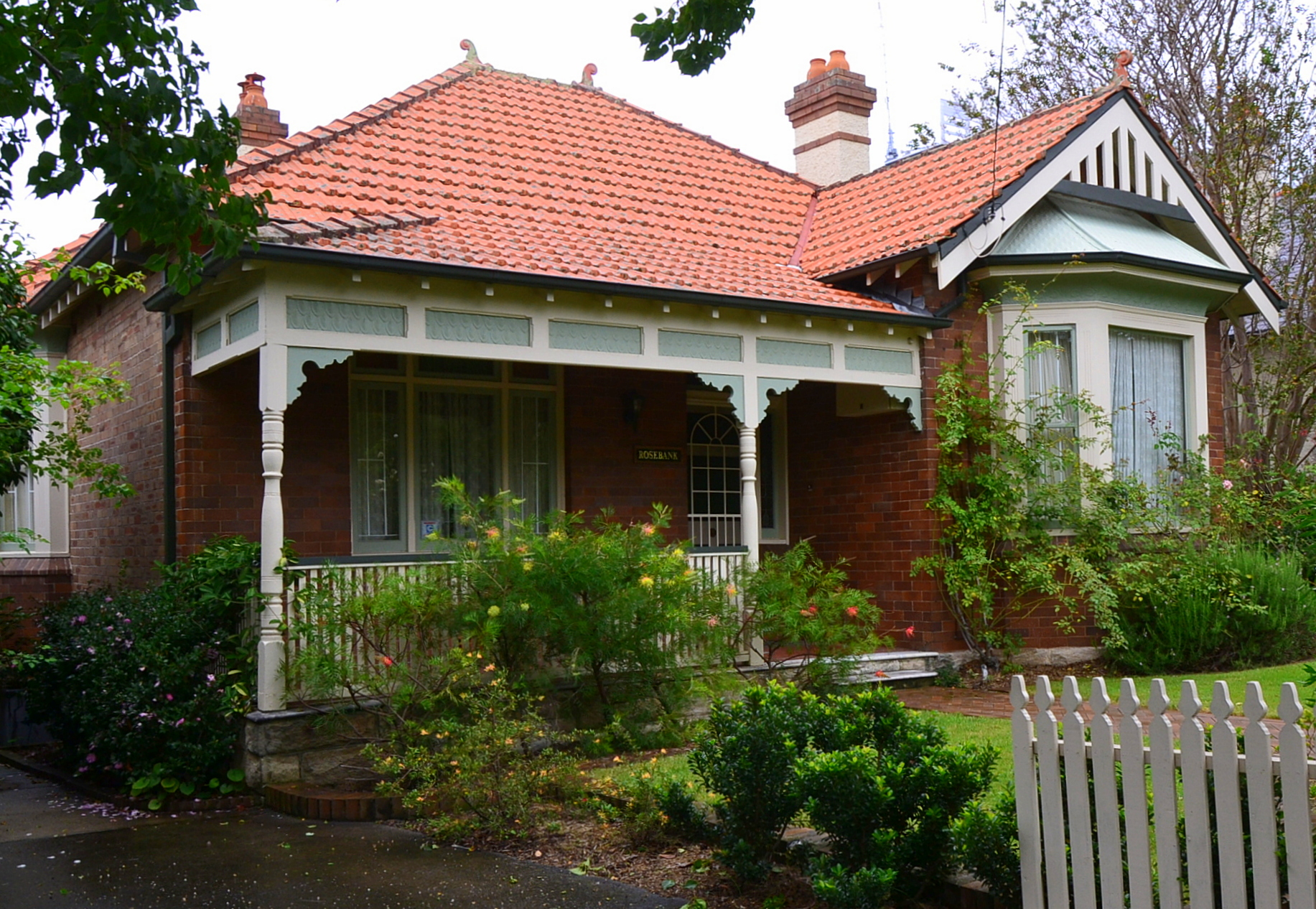
Cottage on Daisy Street, Chatswood

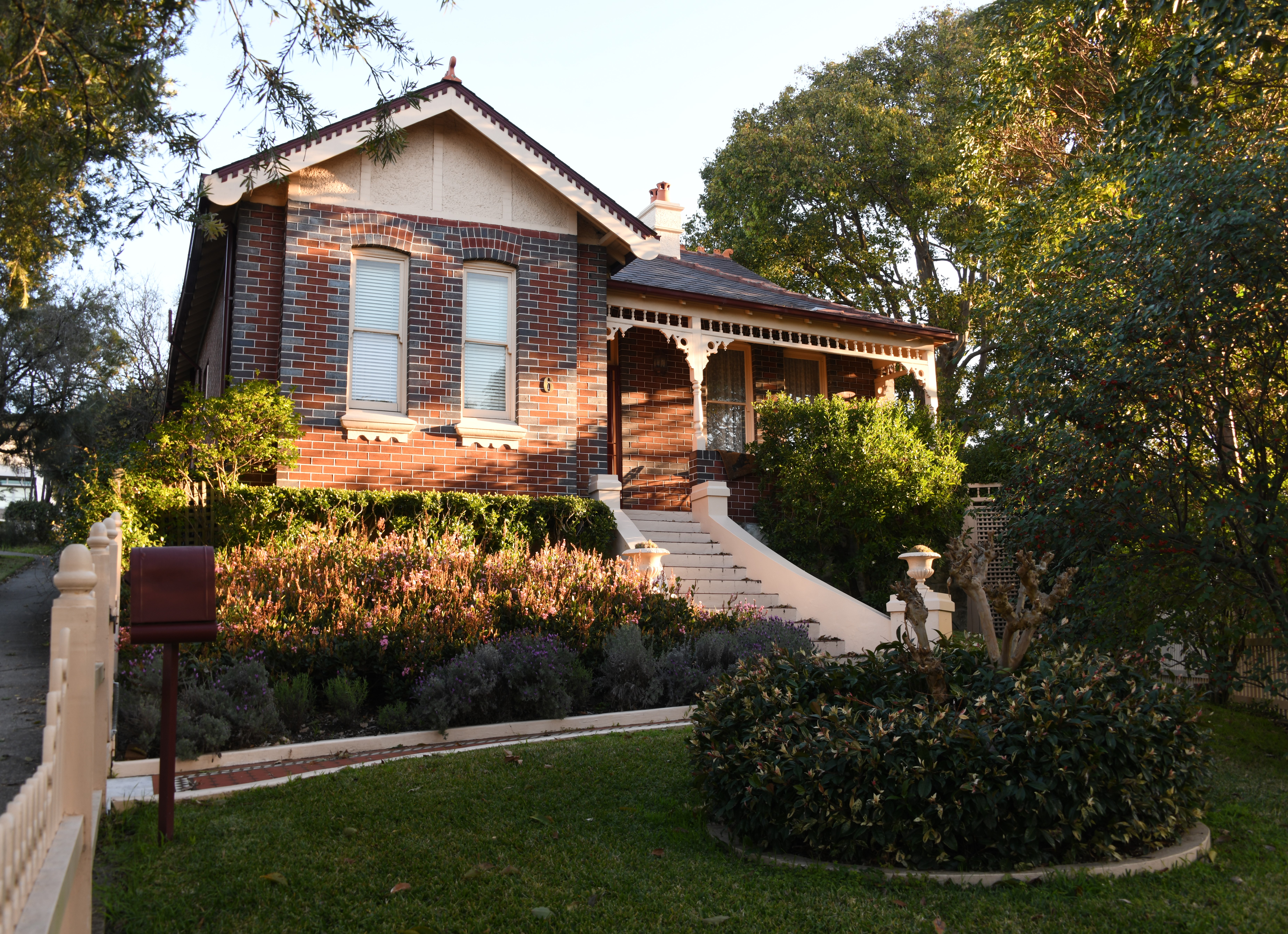
Cottage in Kensington

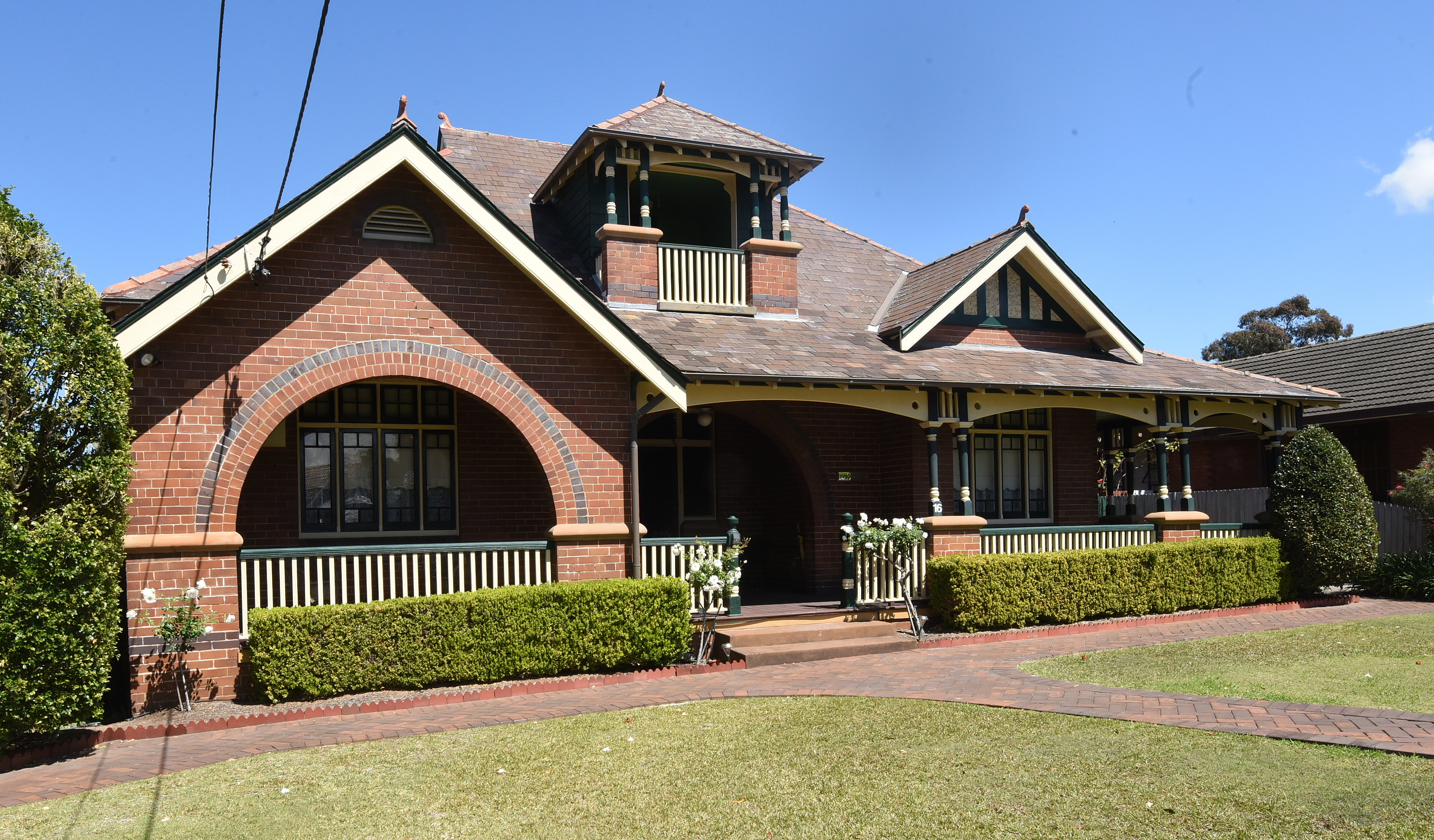
Springfield, Strathfield

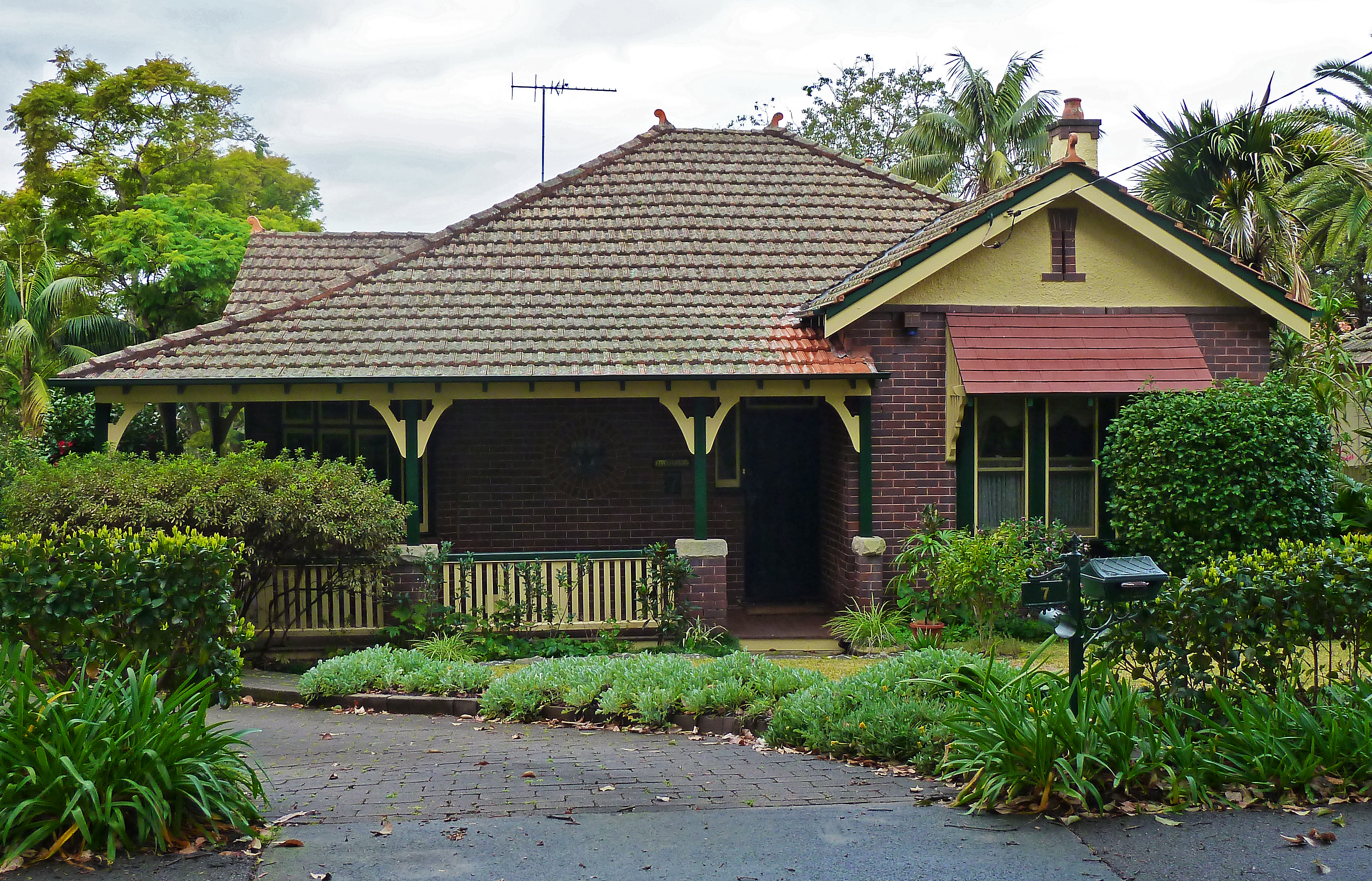
House in Roseville

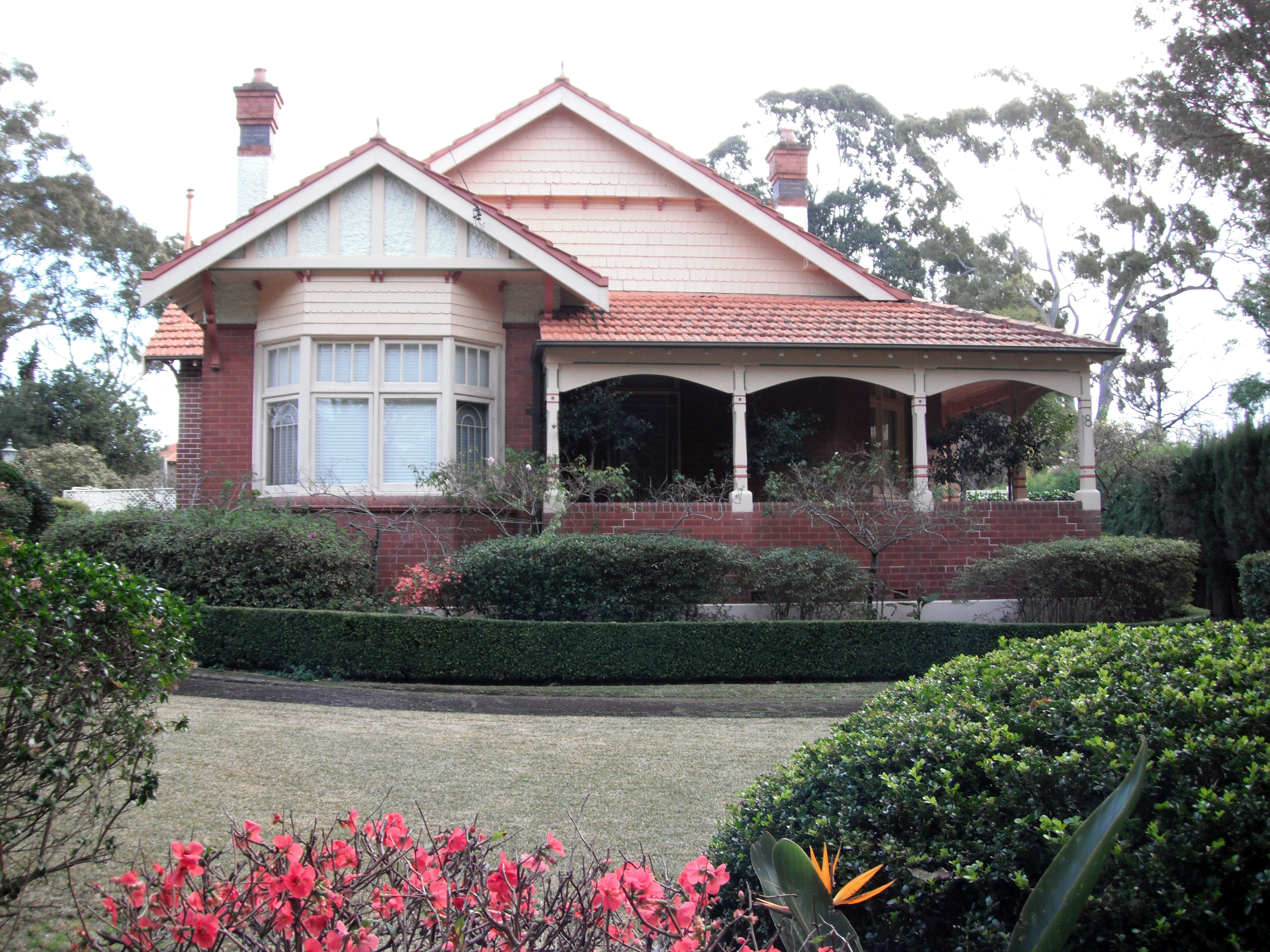
Capua, Appian Way, Burwood

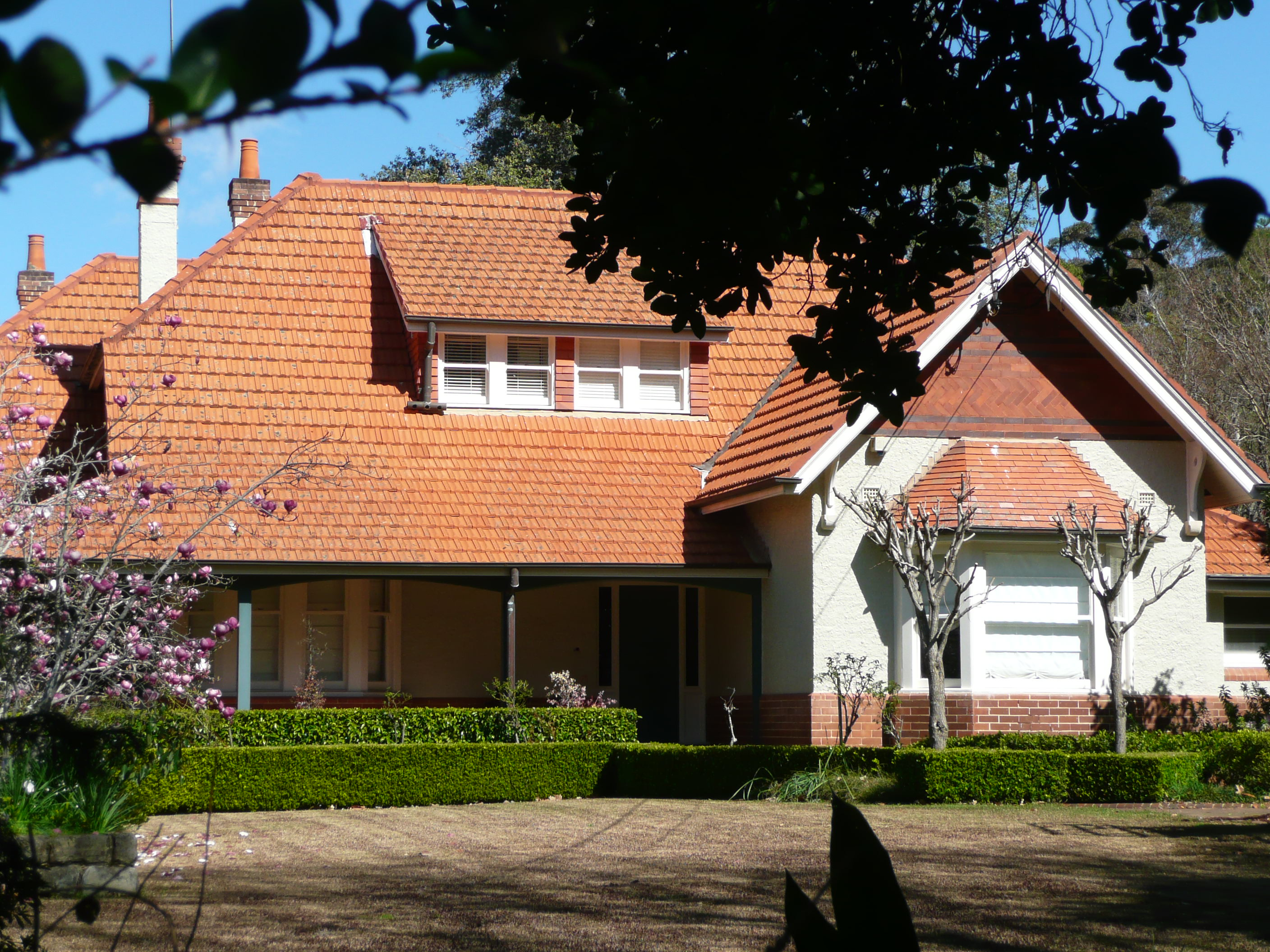
House in Wahroonga

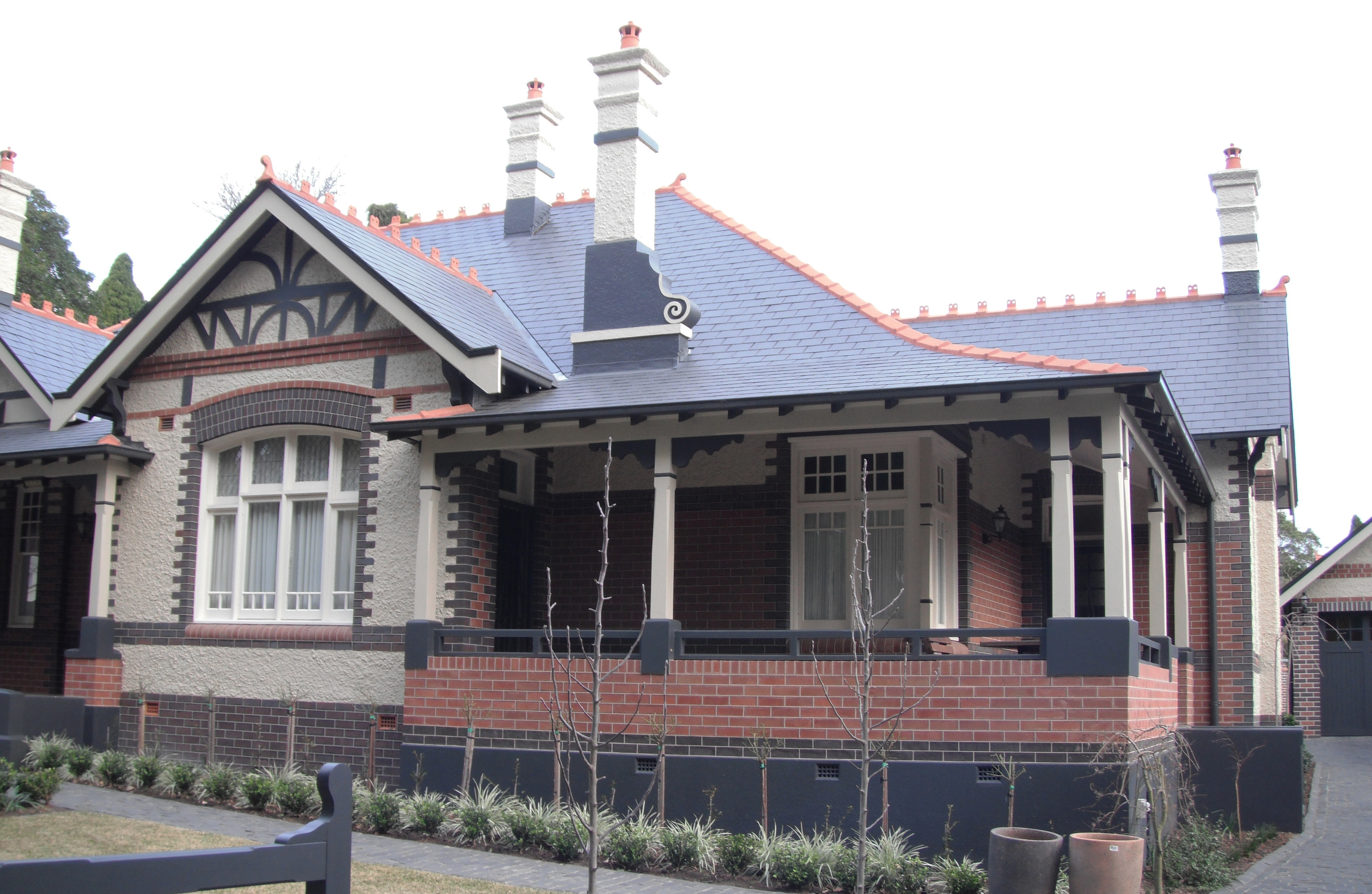
Amalfi, Appian Way, Burwood

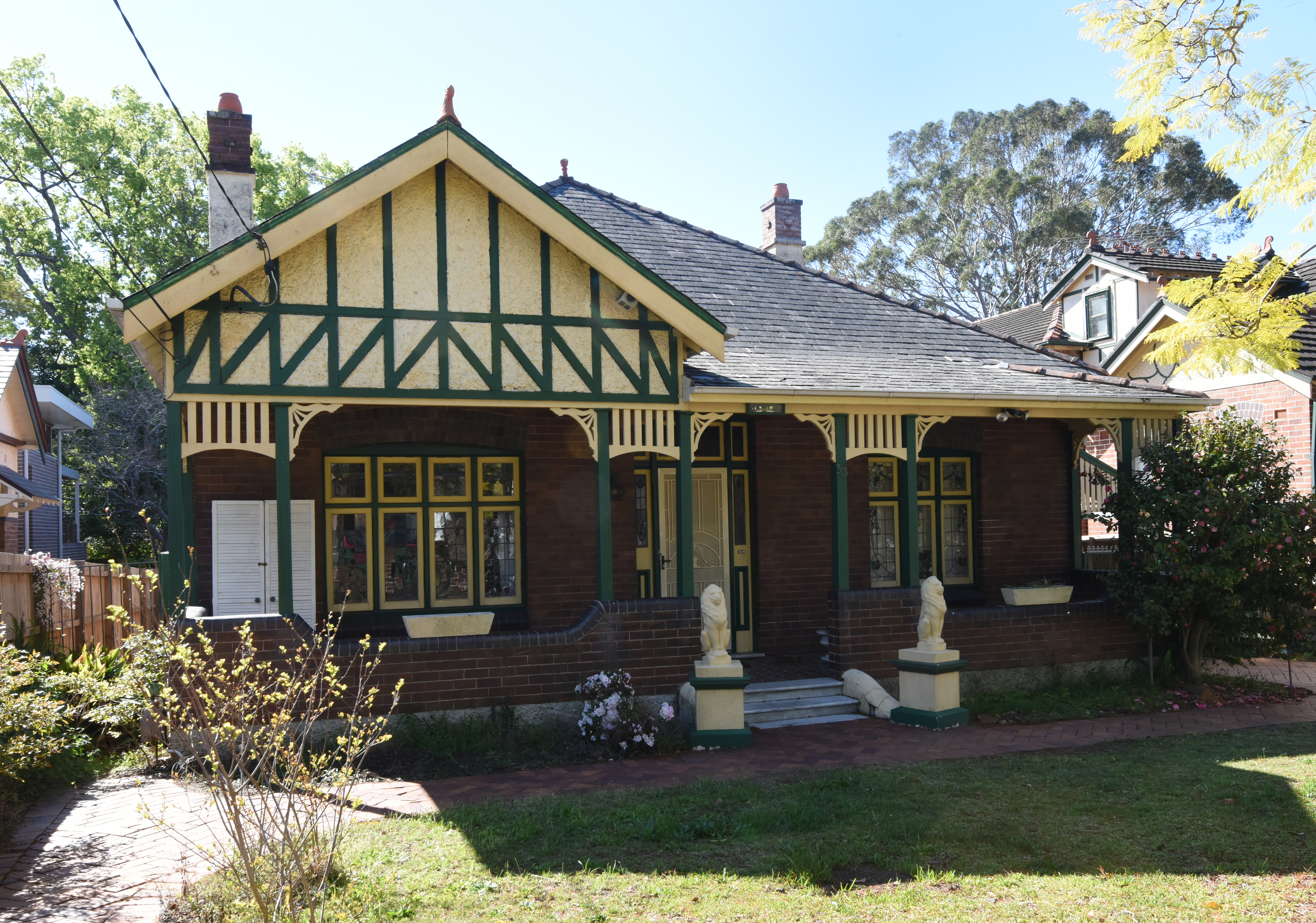
Residence in Strathfield

==== Federation Filigree ====
The filigree style was characterised by the creation of a screen as a prominent style at the front of the house. In the Victorian period, the screen was made of wrought iron, but in the Federation period it was made of wooden fretwork, which could be quite elaborate. It was widely used in Queensland as a way of providing shade and circulation of air for a home.

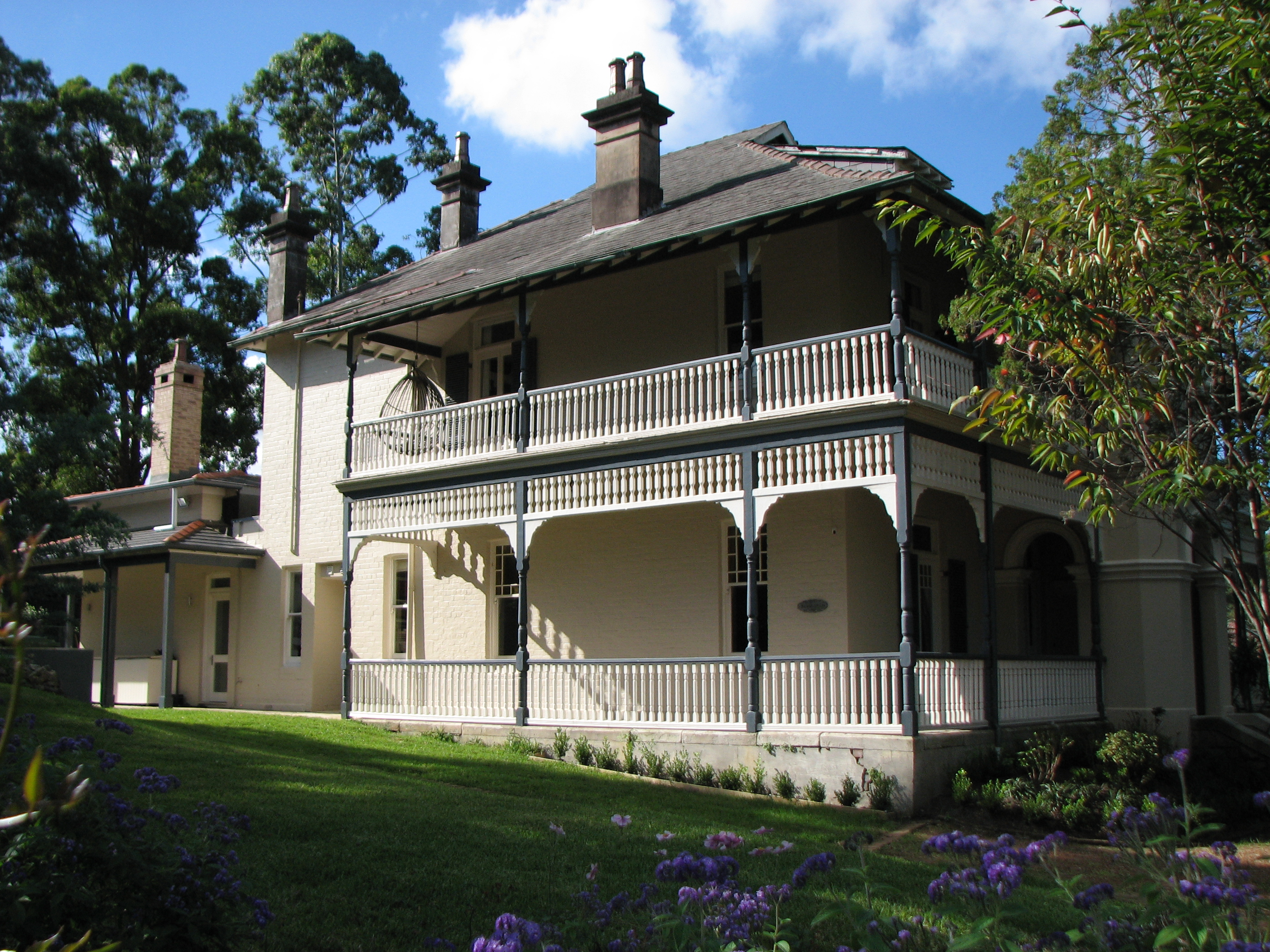
Woodlands, Killara. Completed 1884; verandah added in renovations beginning in c.1895.

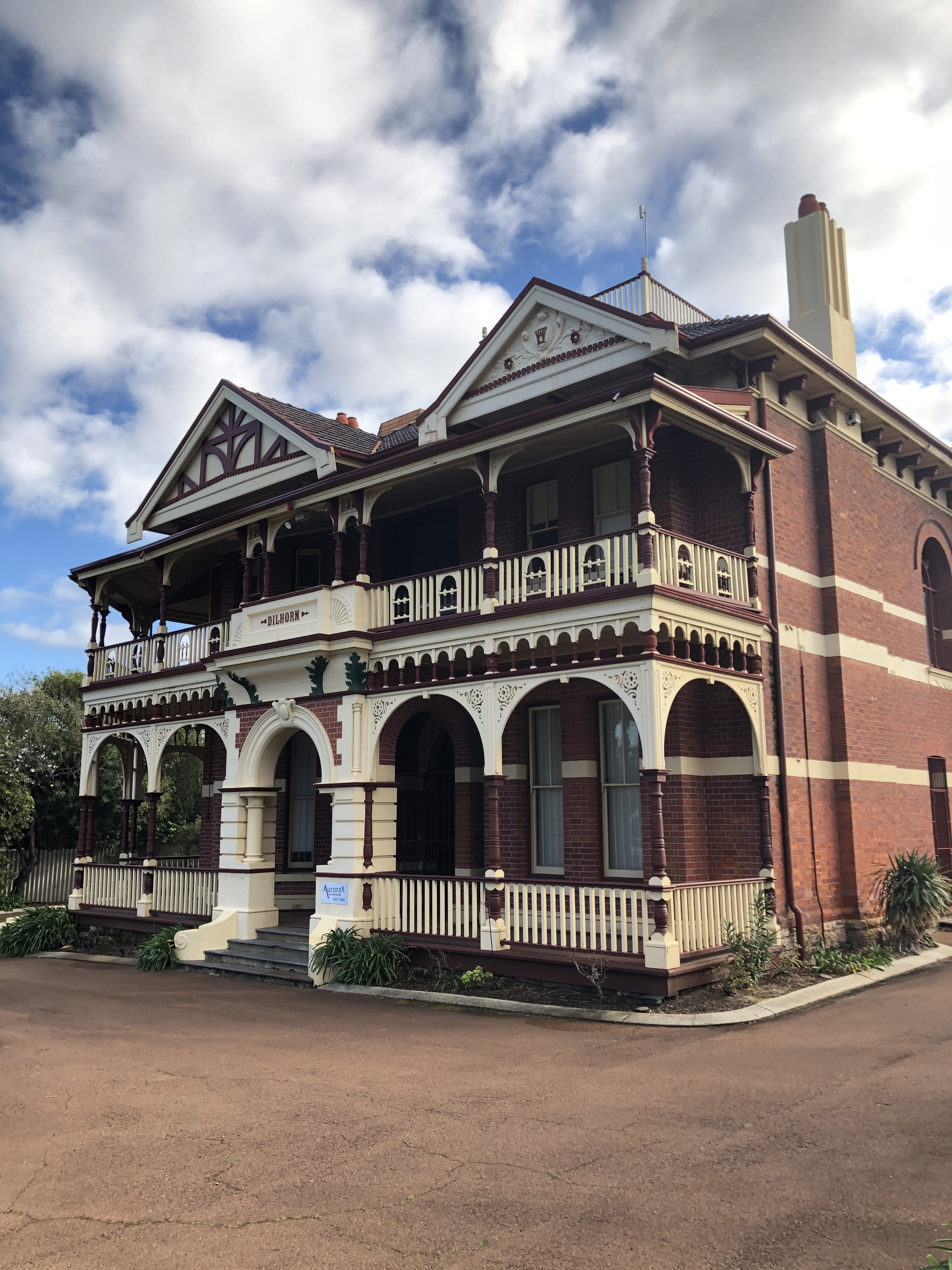
Dilhorn House, Perth; completed 1897. Designed by Joseph John Talbot Hobbs.

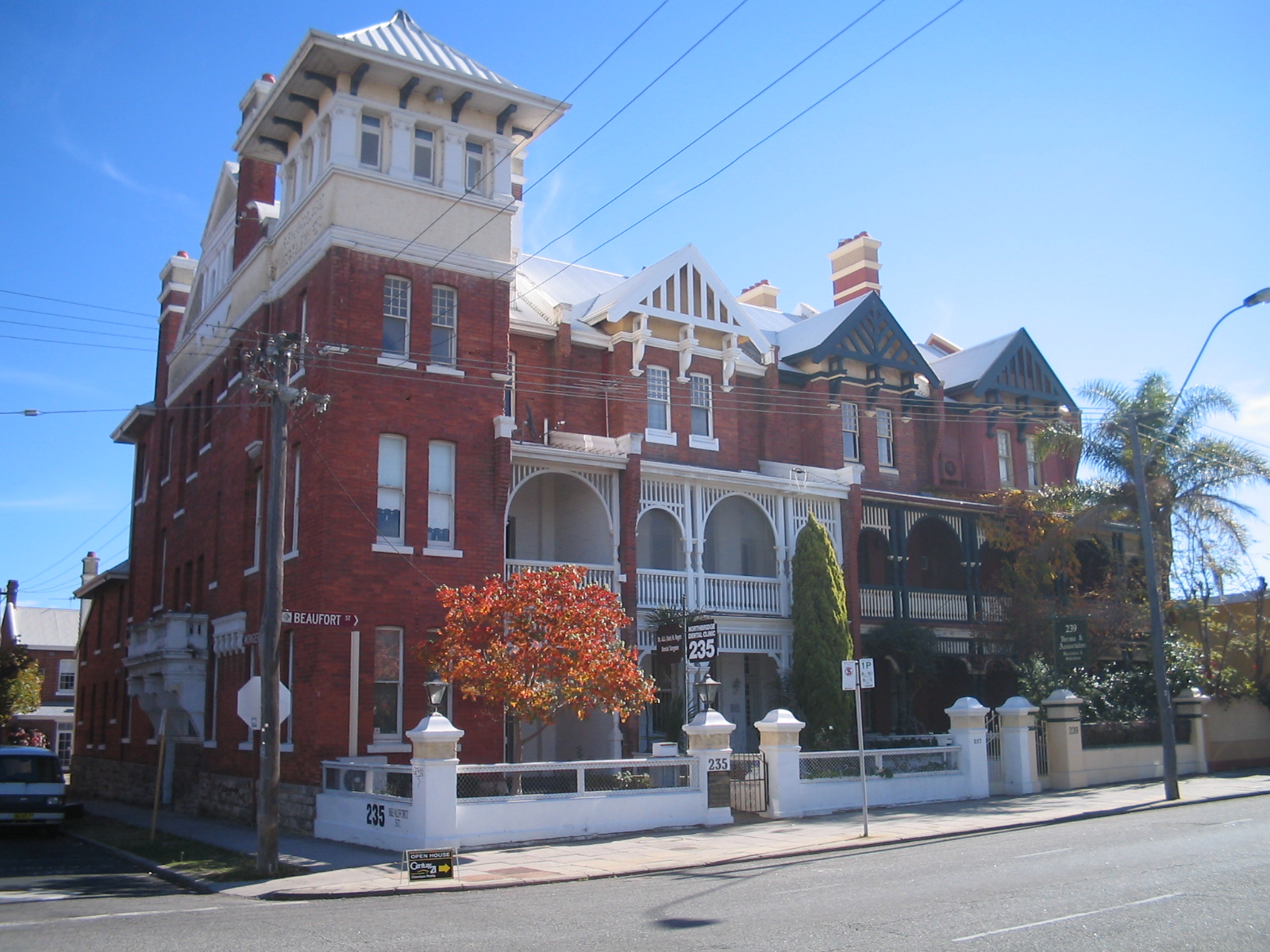
A row of Federation Queen Anne-Filigree grand-terraces, Perth (c.1897).

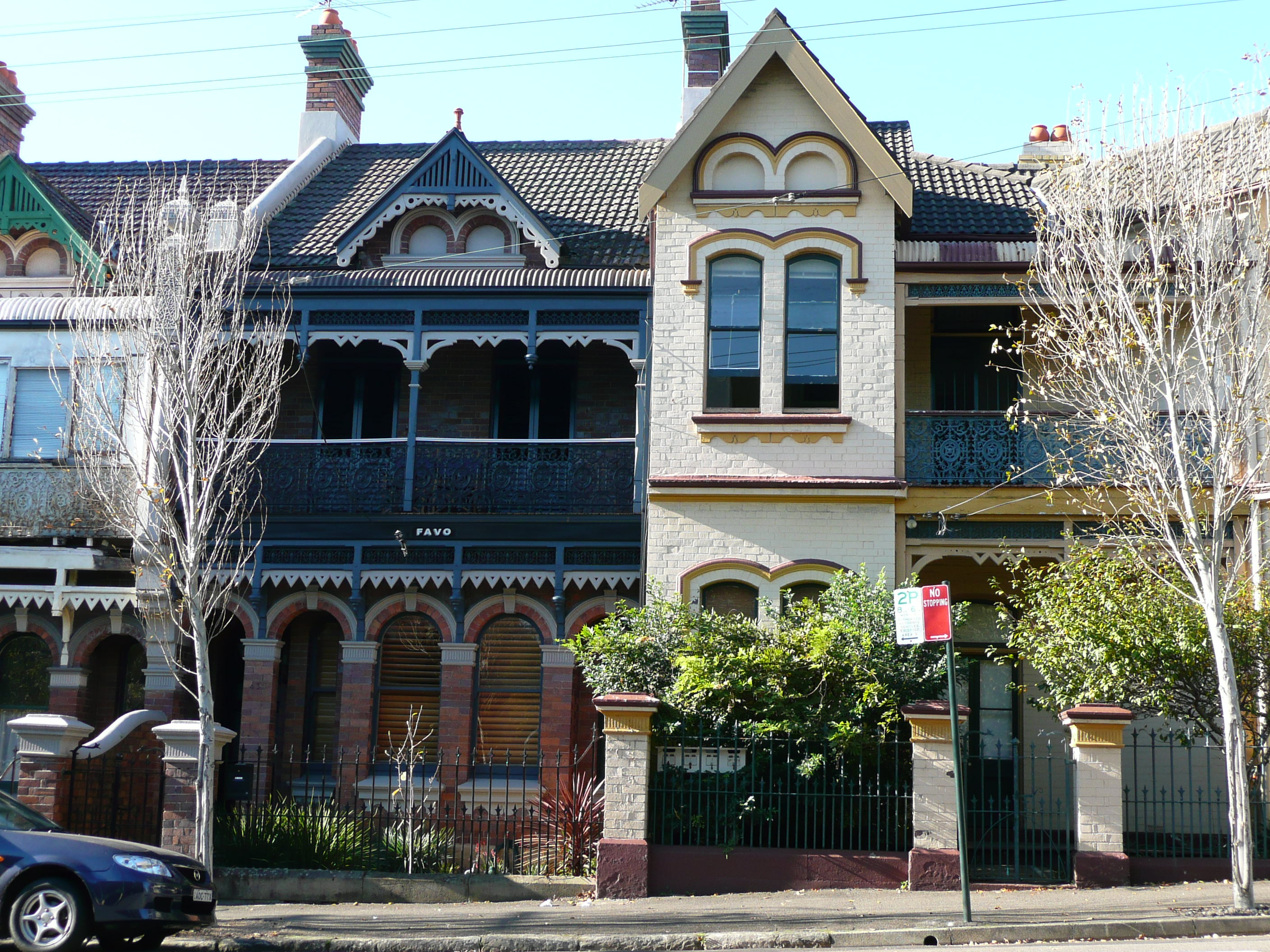
Edna, Favo, & Gaza; Glebe (c. 1899–1900), eclectic, red-brick terrace row.

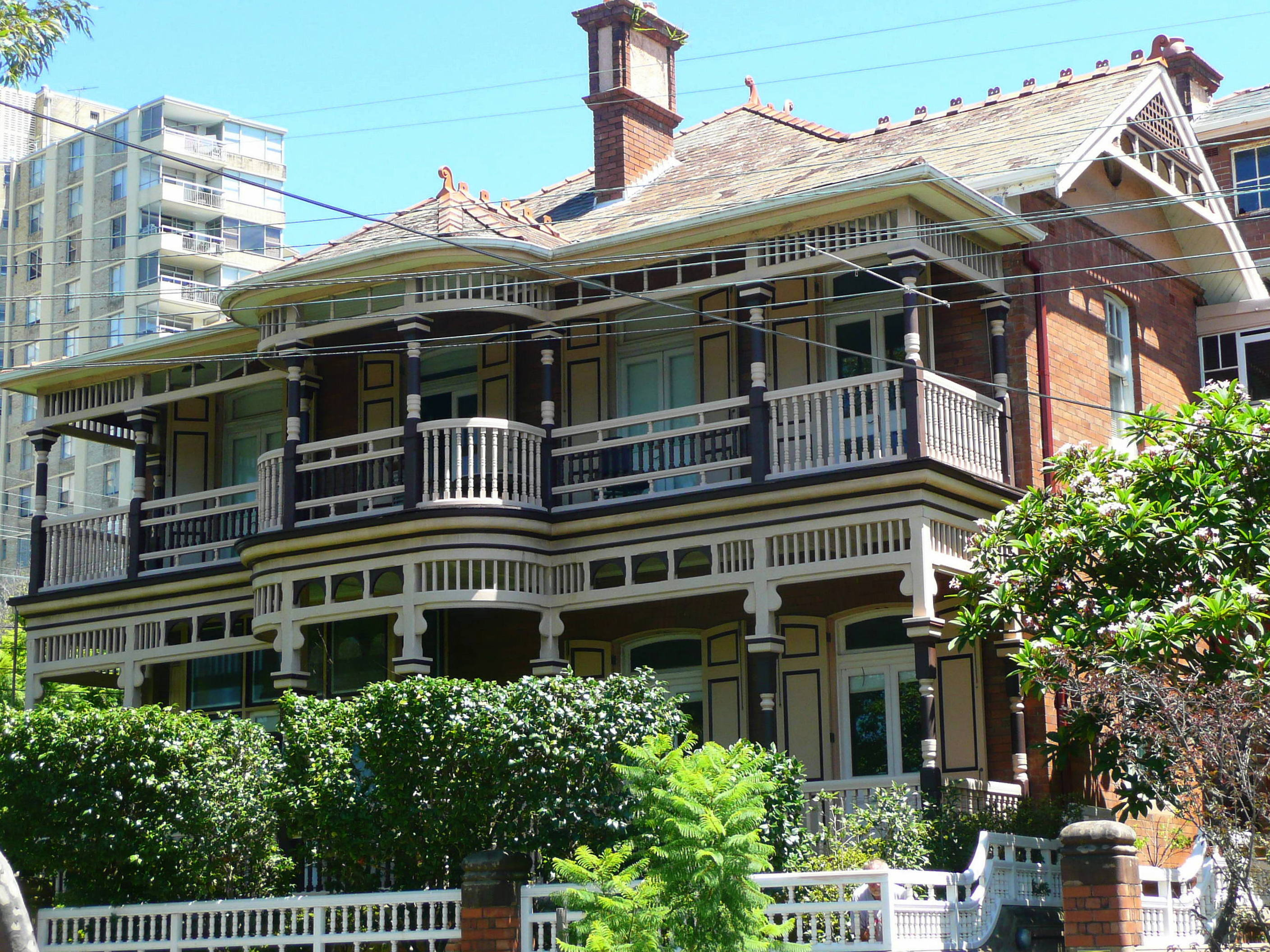
Elvo, Woollahra, (c.1900). A Queen Anne style house with strong Federation Filigree elements.

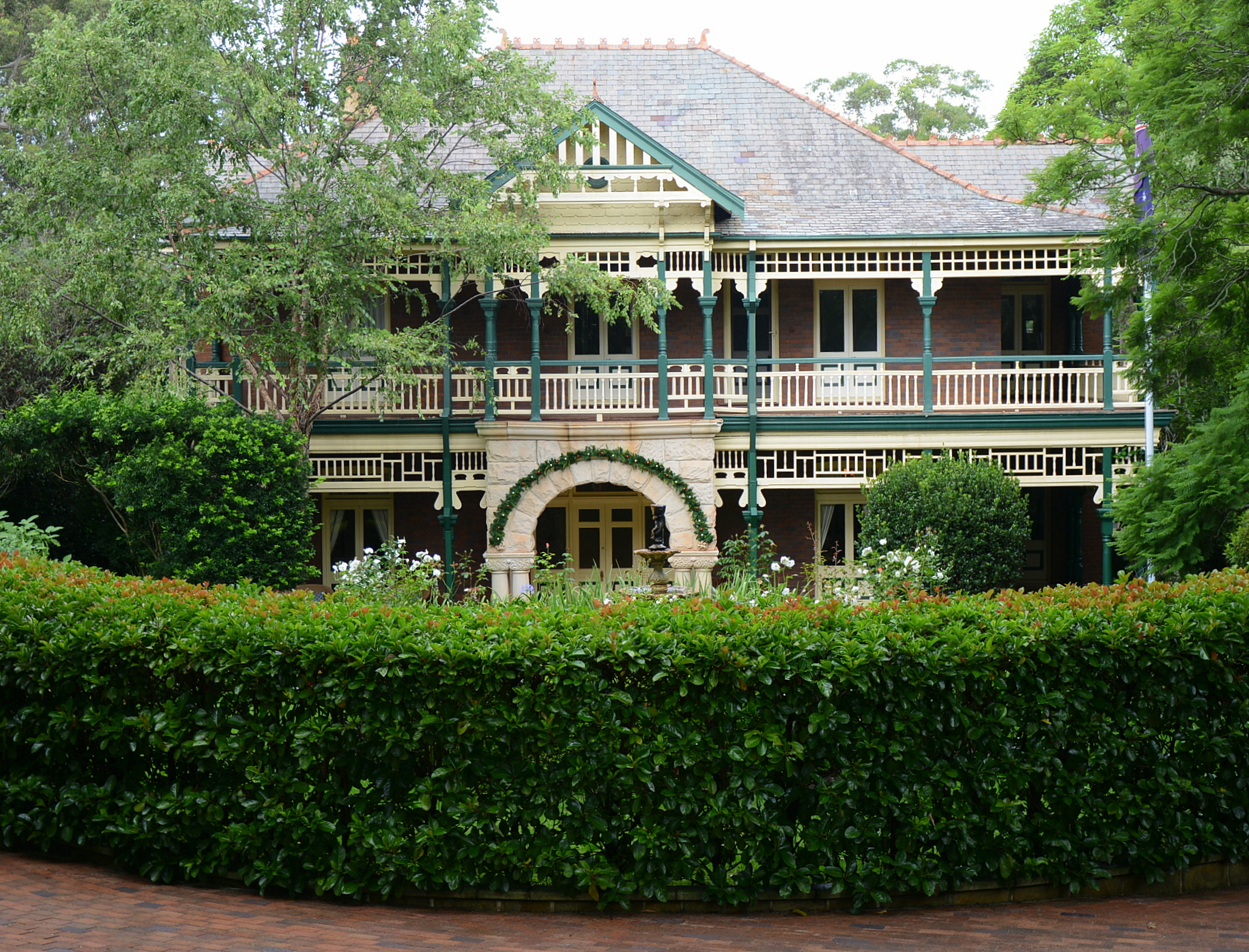
Glensloy, Turramurra (1901).

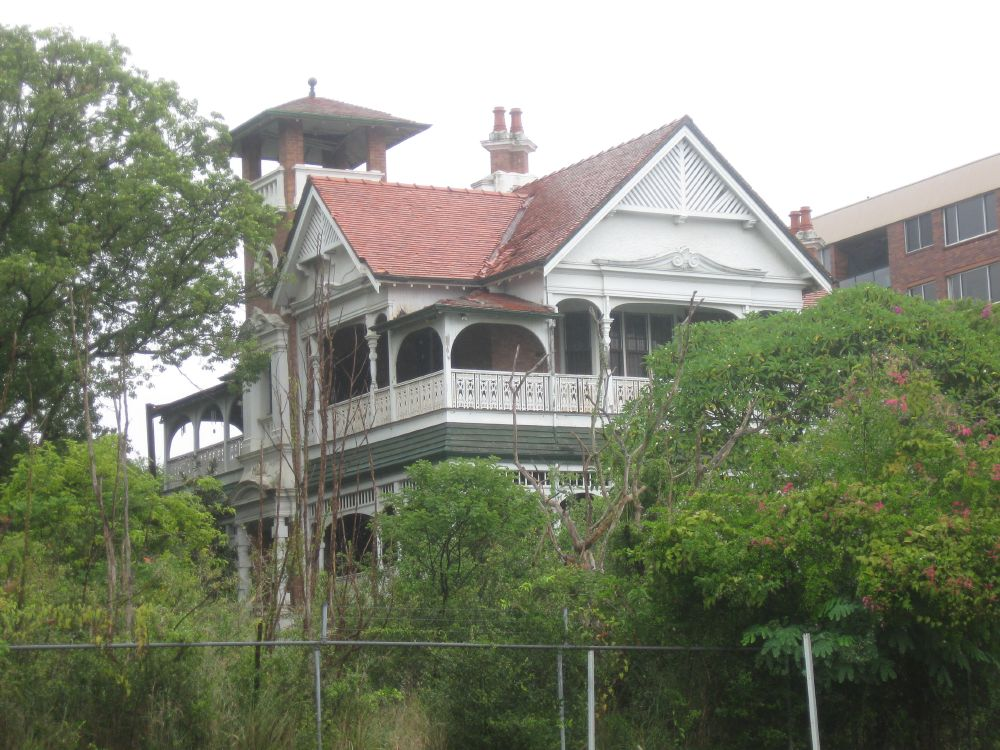
Lamb House, Kangaroo Point (1902-1908)

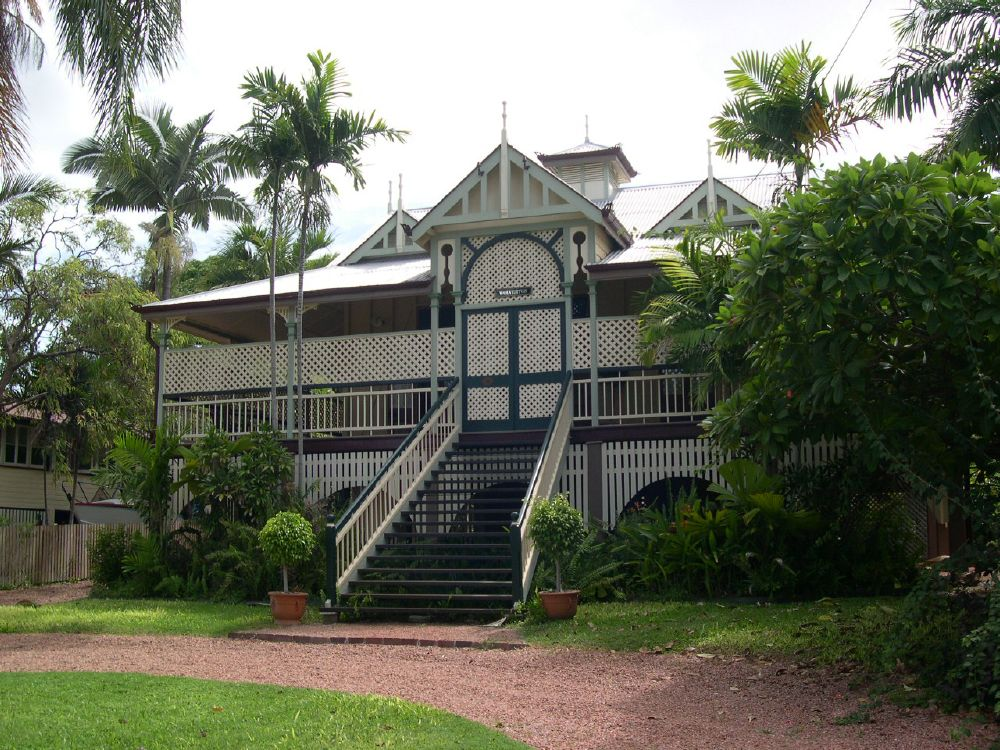
Wolverton, Townsville. Built c. 1903.

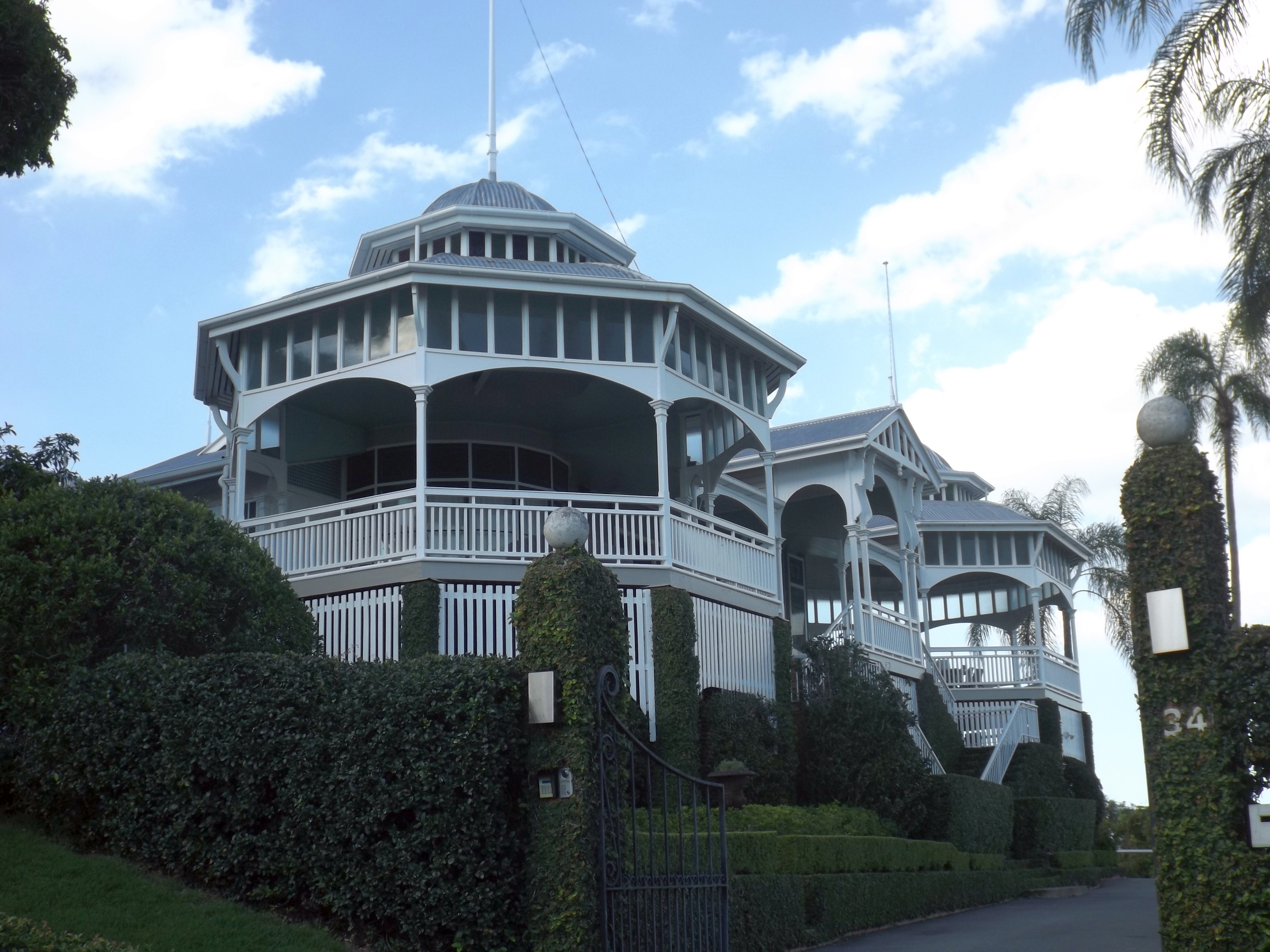
Cremorne, Hamilton (1905-1906)

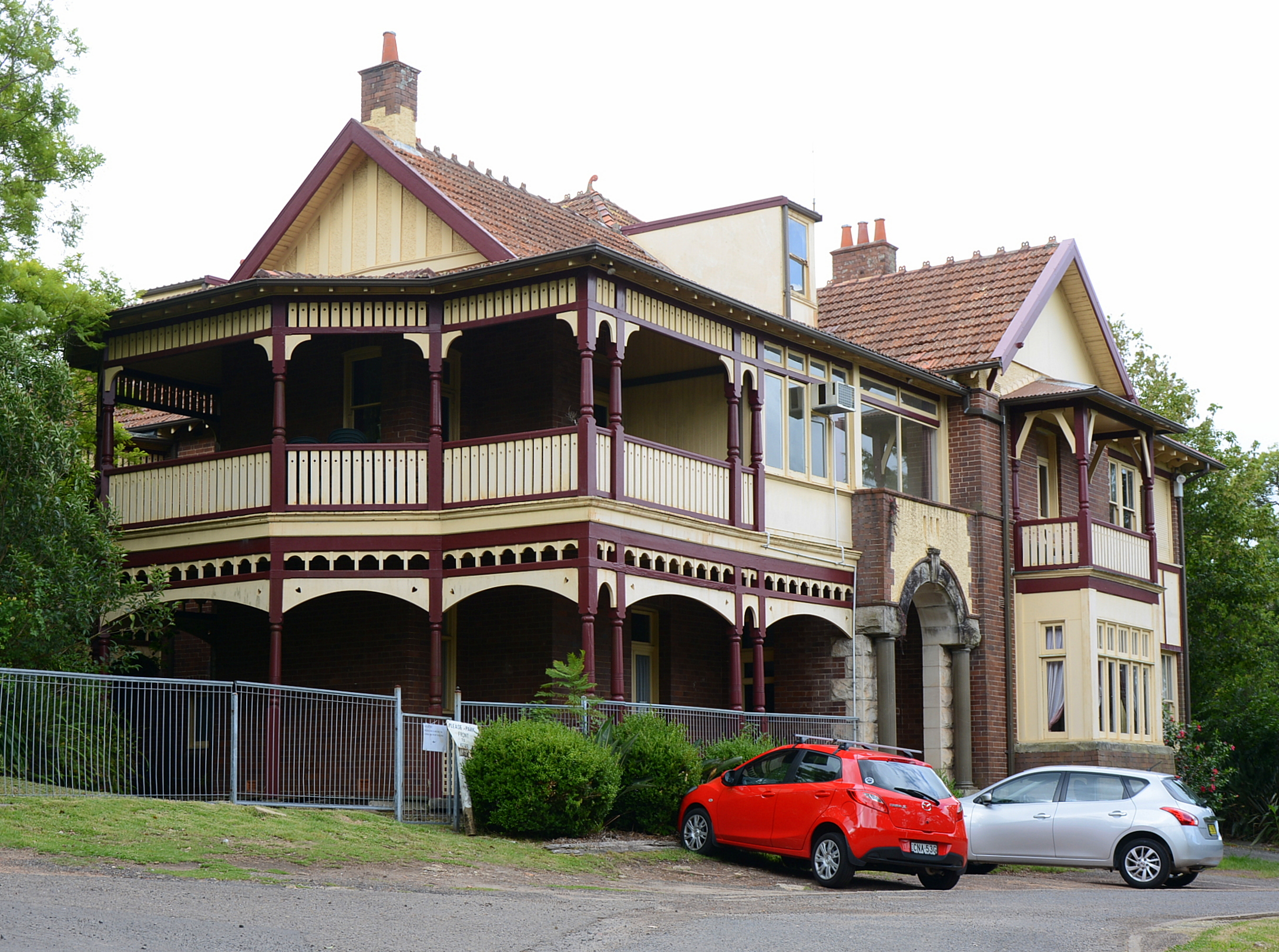
Hillview, Turramurra (1913)

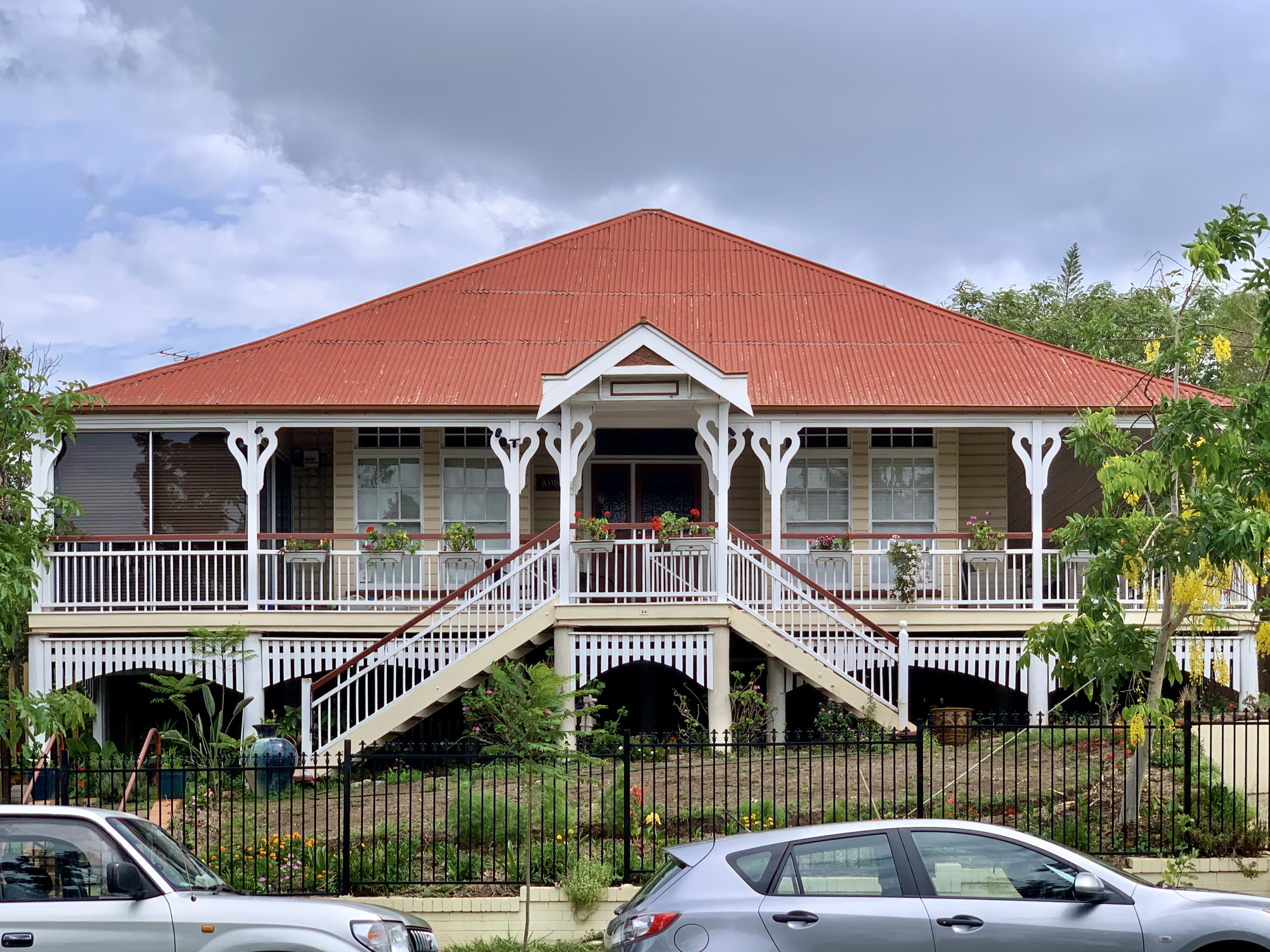
Kameruka, Ipswich (1917). Federation Filigree-style Queenslander with double access stairs.

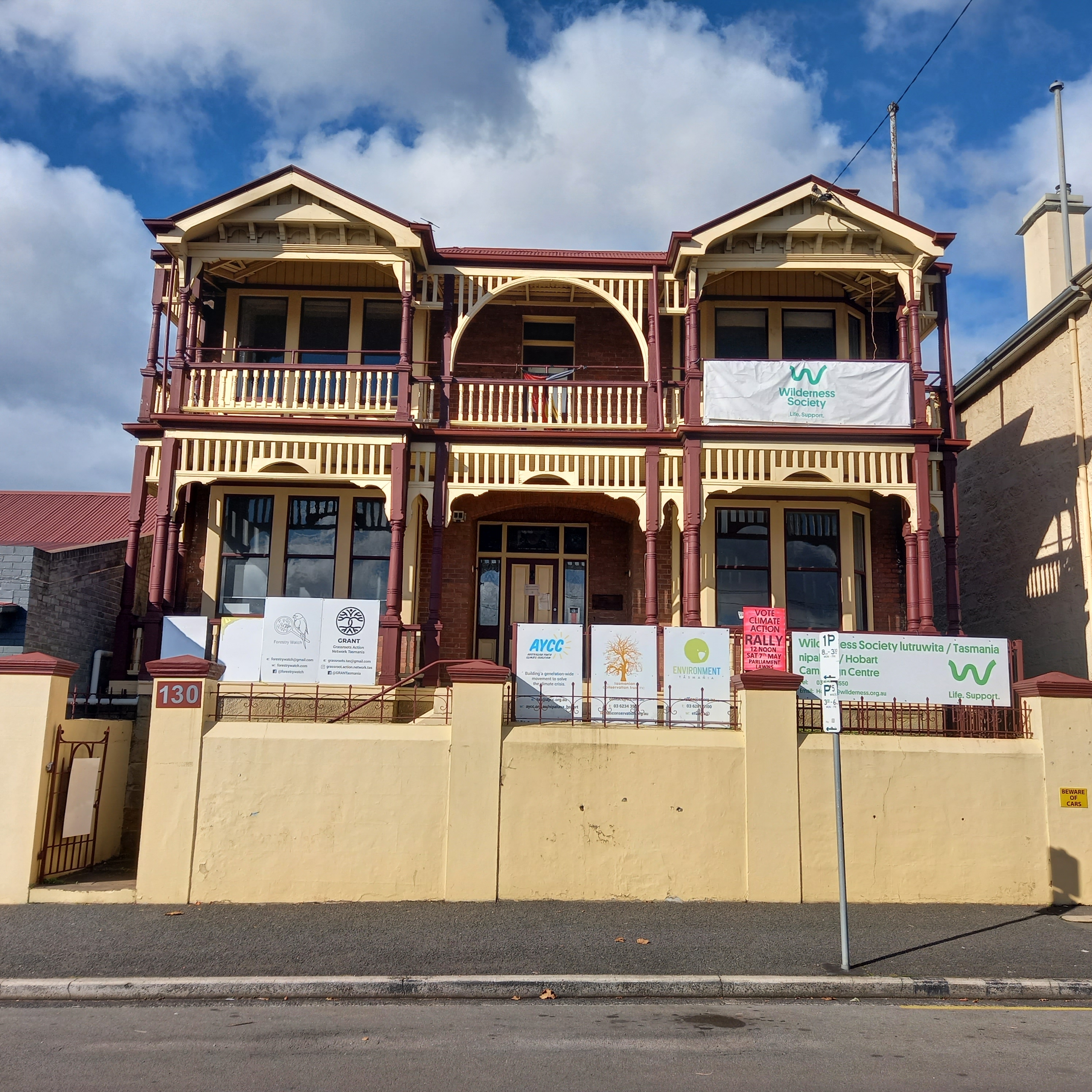
House, Davey Street, Hobart, with prominent fretworked verandah.

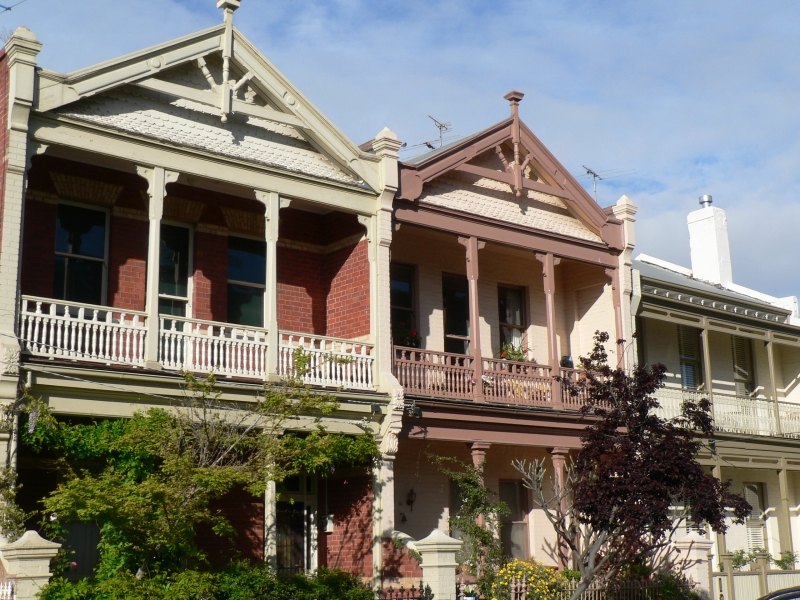
Timber fretwork terraces. Madden Street, Albert Park

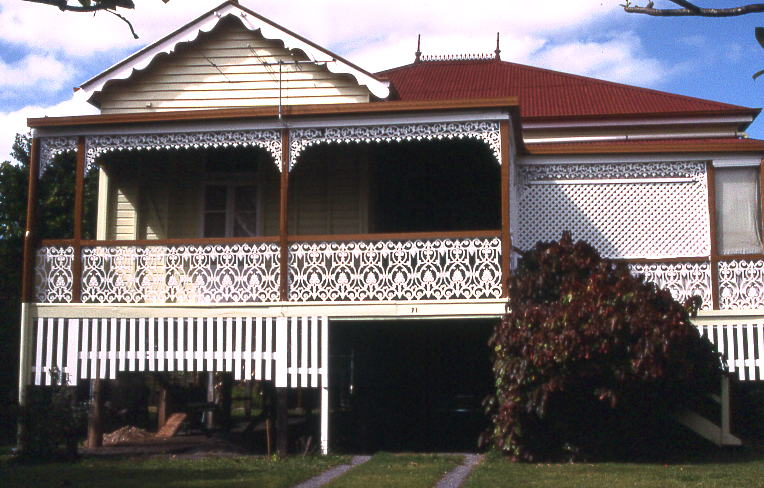
Home, Rockhampton

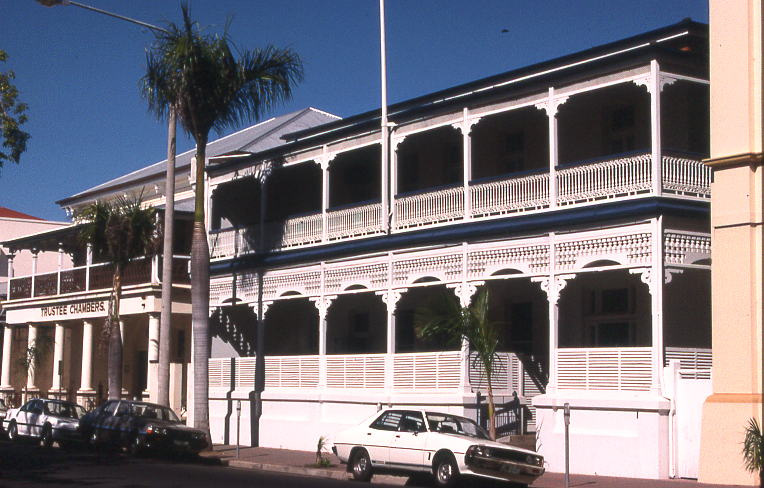
Building, Rockhampton

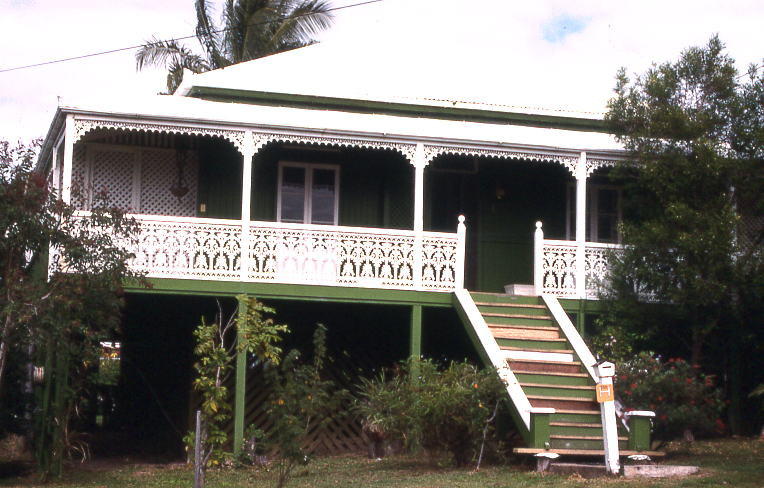
Home, Rockhampton

=== Inter-war period c. 1915 – c. 1940 ===
Styles which existed during the 1915–40 period include Edwardian, Georgian Revival, Academic Classical, Free Classical, Bungalow, Mediterranean, Spanish Mission, Art-Deco, Skyscraper Gothic, Romanesque, Gothic and Old English.

==== Inter-war Californian Bungalow ====
1915–1940 This style can almost instantly be recognised by the columns holding up a front verandah area. The name is almost self-explanatory: bungalow, a rugged type of home. This led to the belief that picket fences looked appropriate at the front fence, although originally they were not used. Darker colours were originally used but, as the years went by, new brighter paint served as a welcoming change to open up the spaces and brighten up the homes. Stone, brick and timber, earthy materials were used. A gable roof faced either the front or side always.

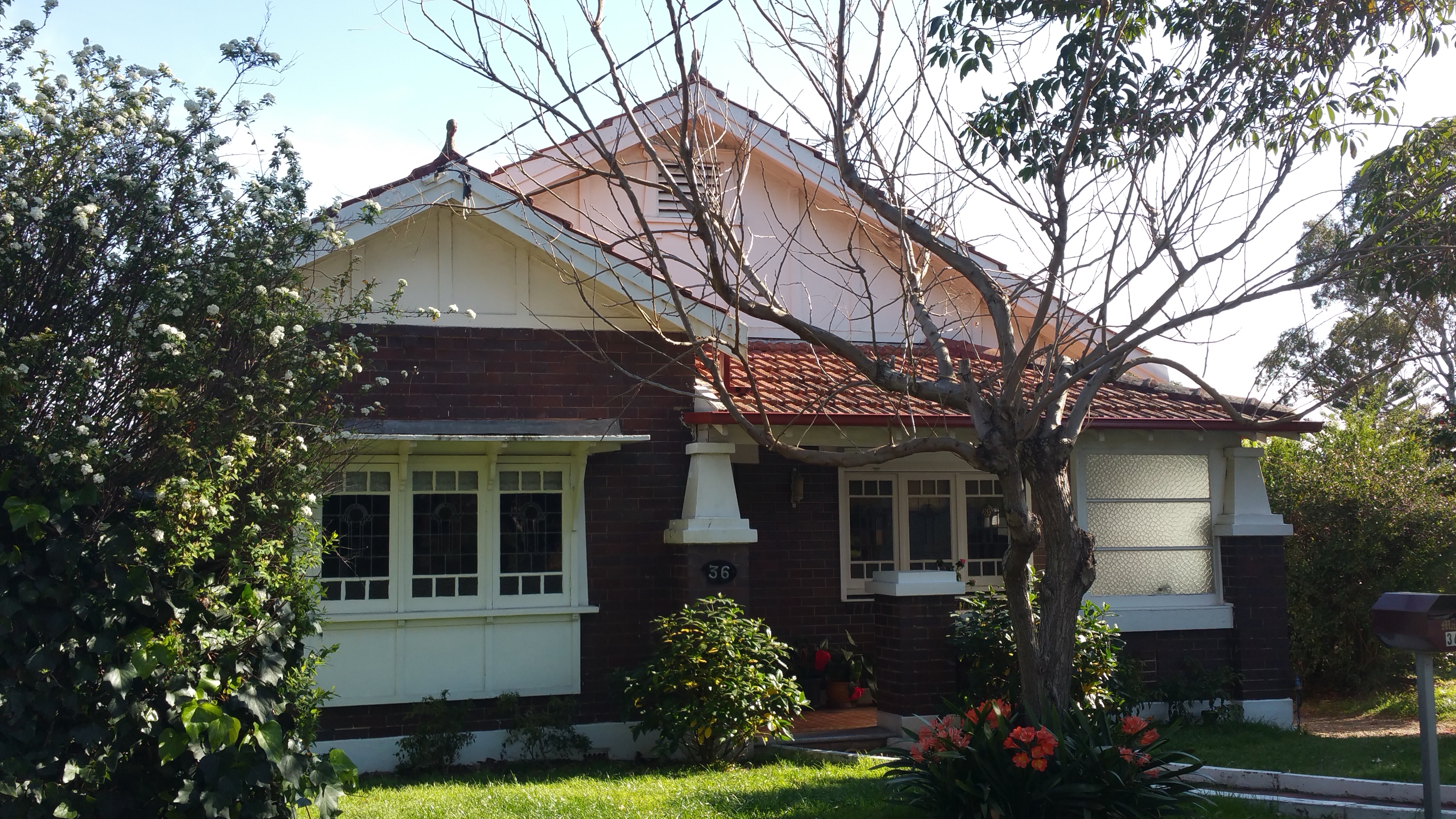
Residence in Ashbury, New South Wales

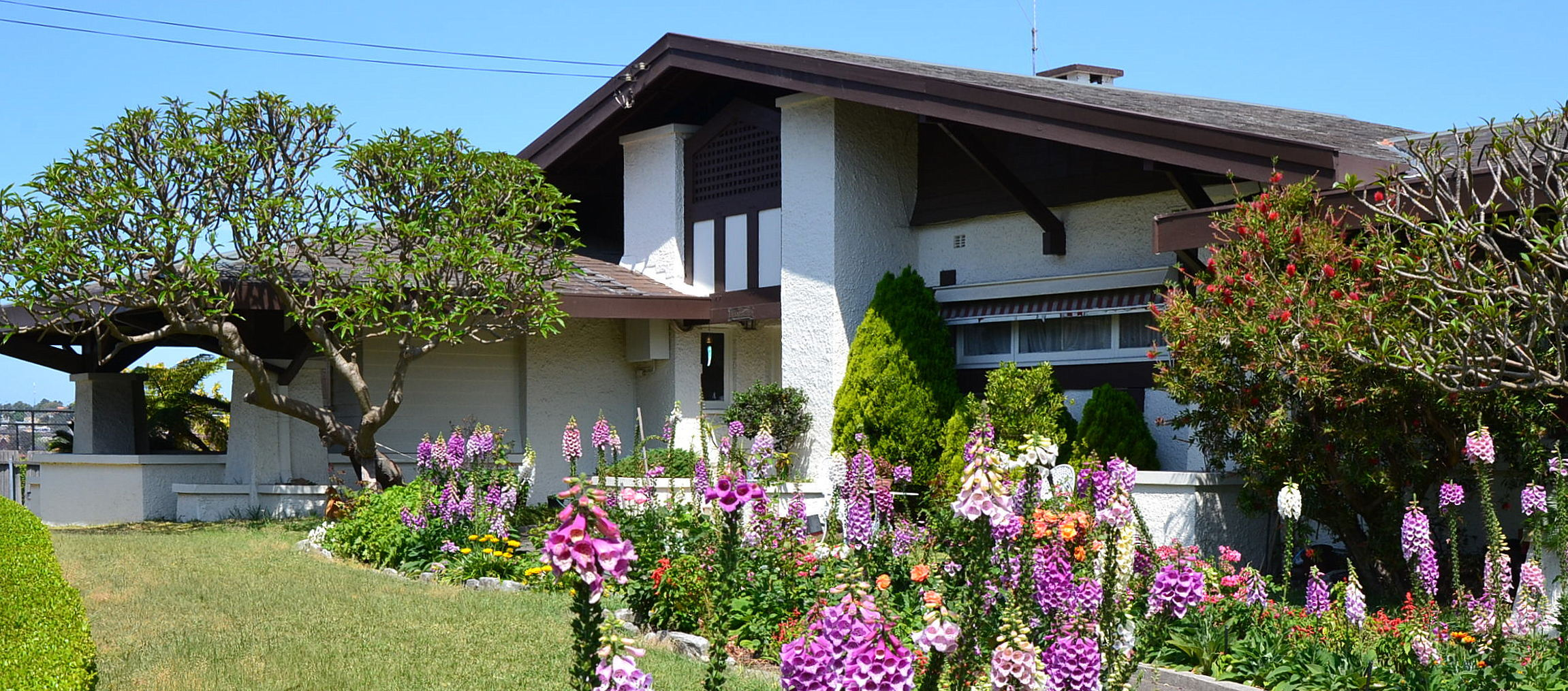
Belvedere, Cremorne; built 1919; Alexander Stewart Jolly, architect.

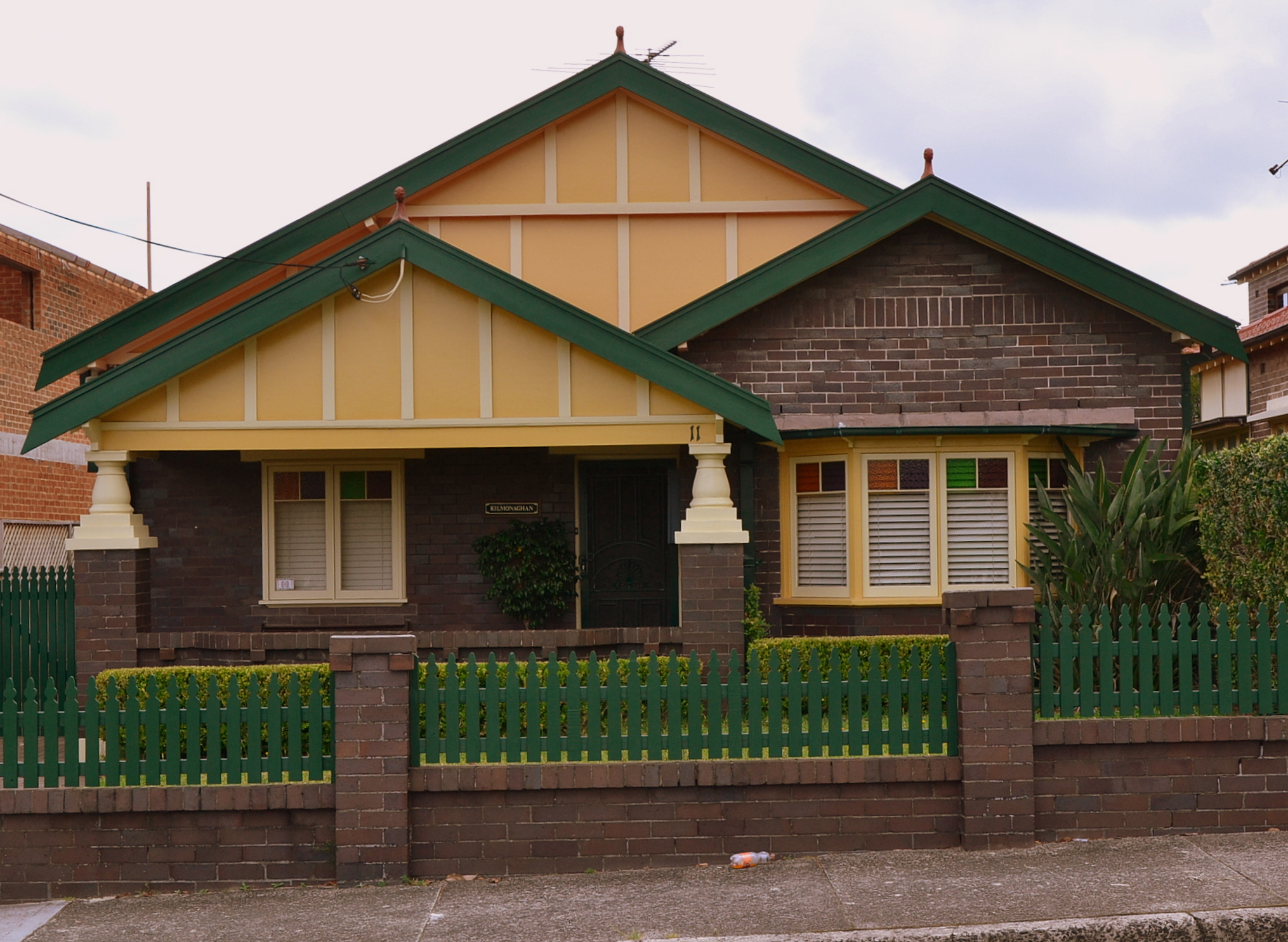
House in Kingsford

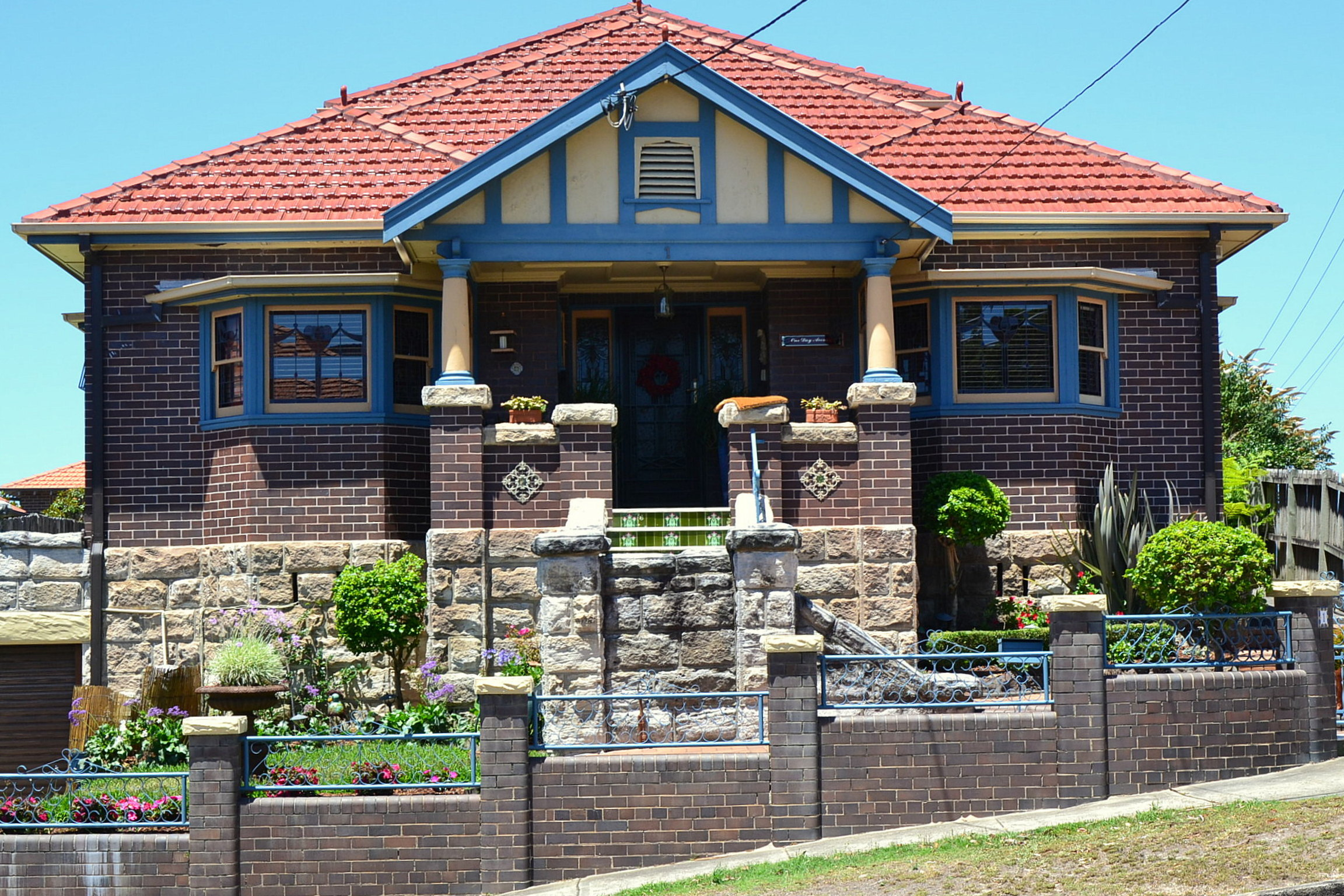
House in Kensington

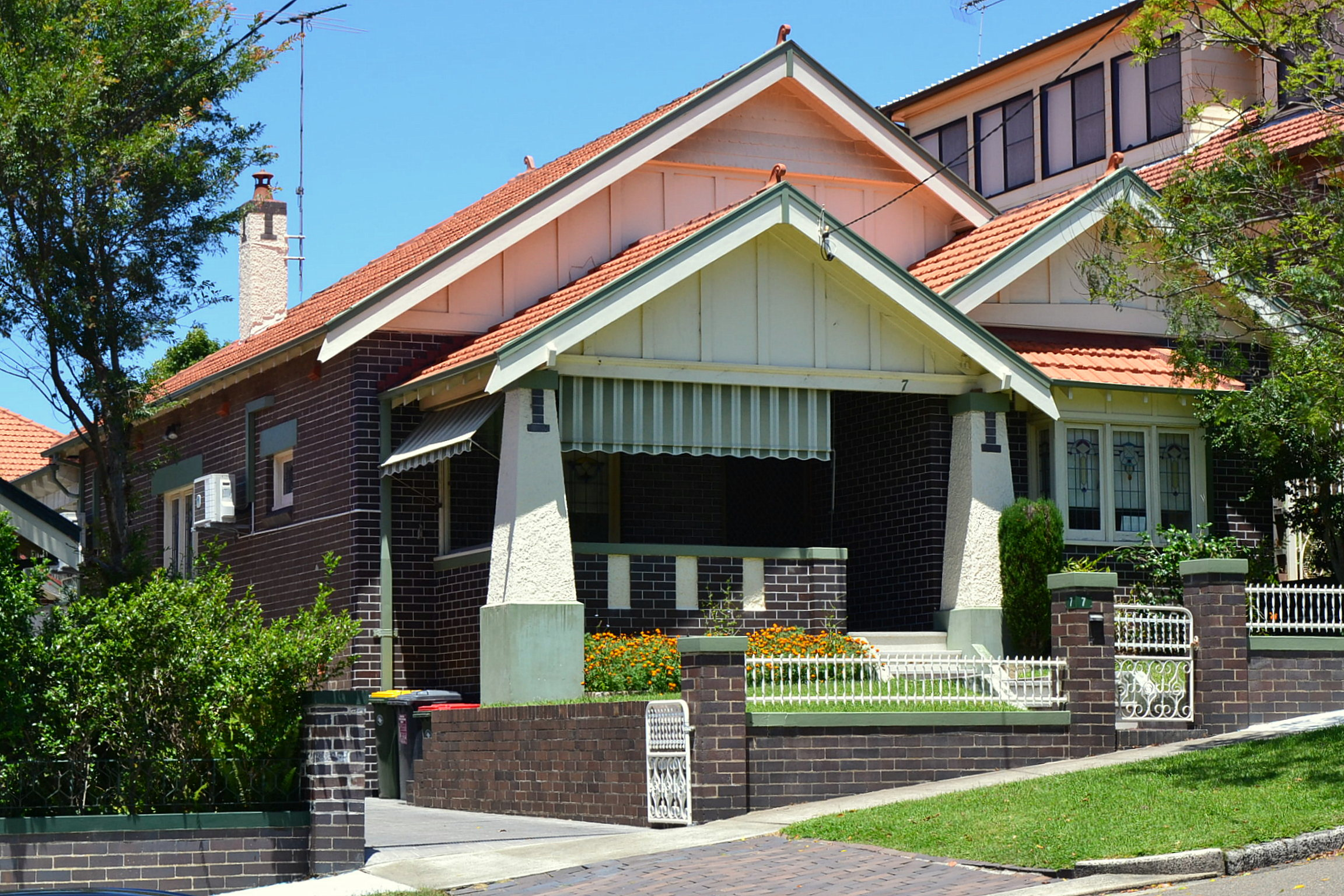
House in Kensington

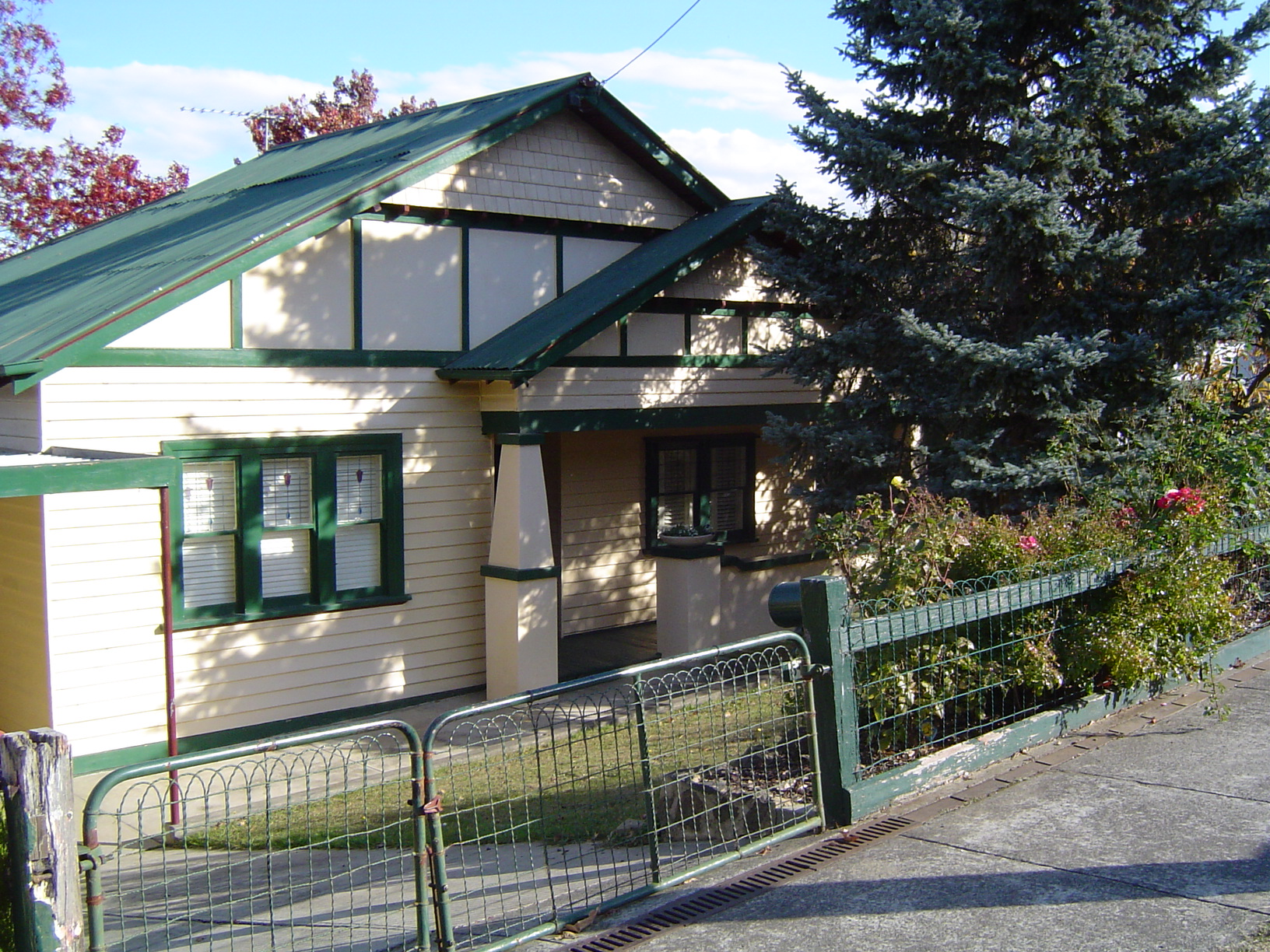
Californian Bungalow, Preston

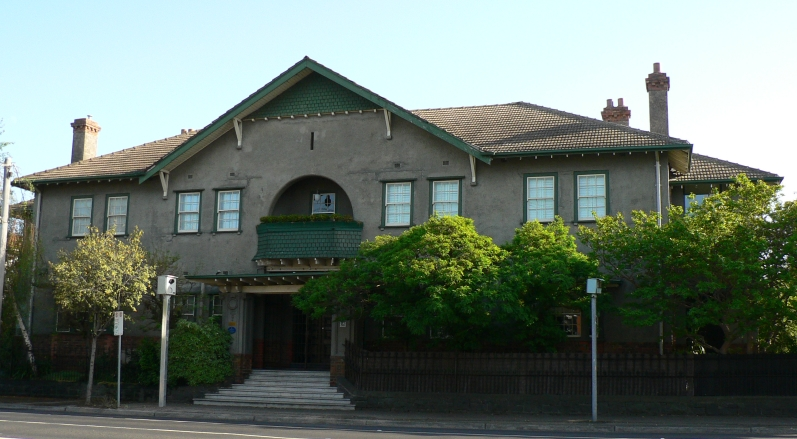
Belmont Flats. Alma Road, St Kilda; completed 1923. Rare example of the bungalow style applied to an apartment building

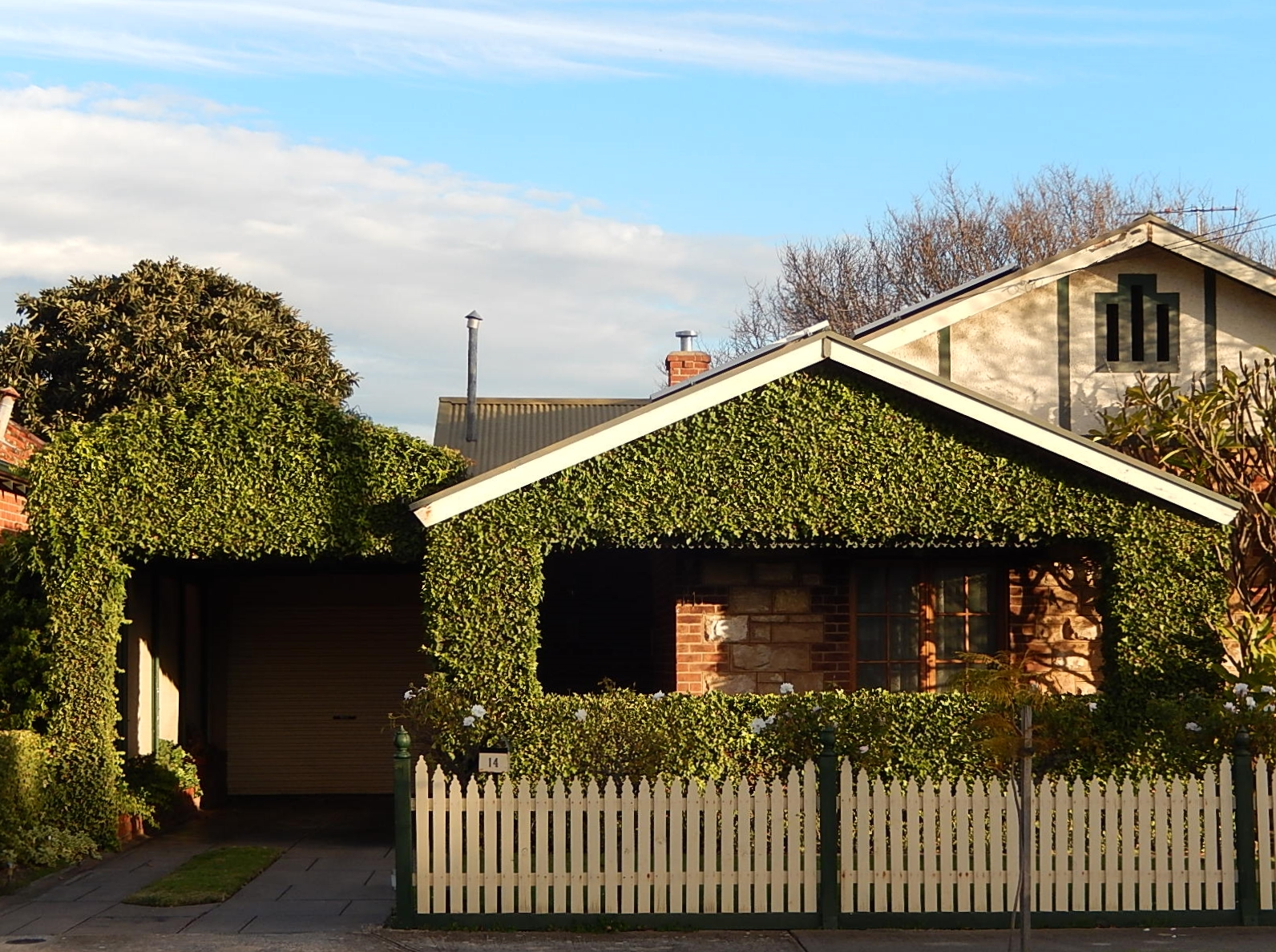
Home in Glandore

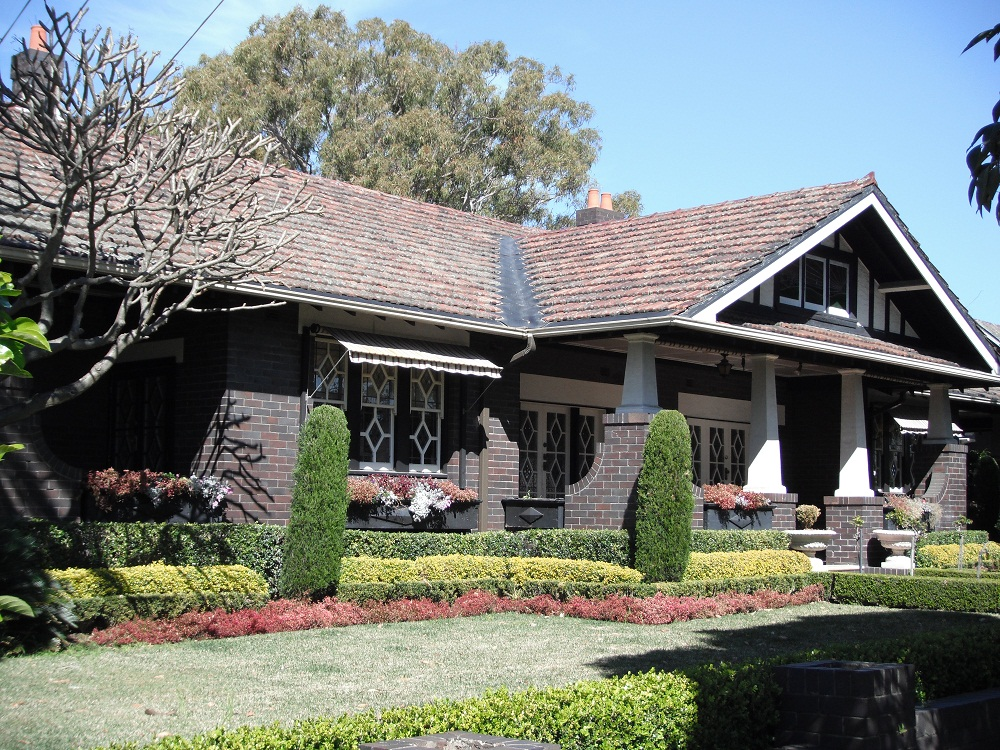
House in Haberfield

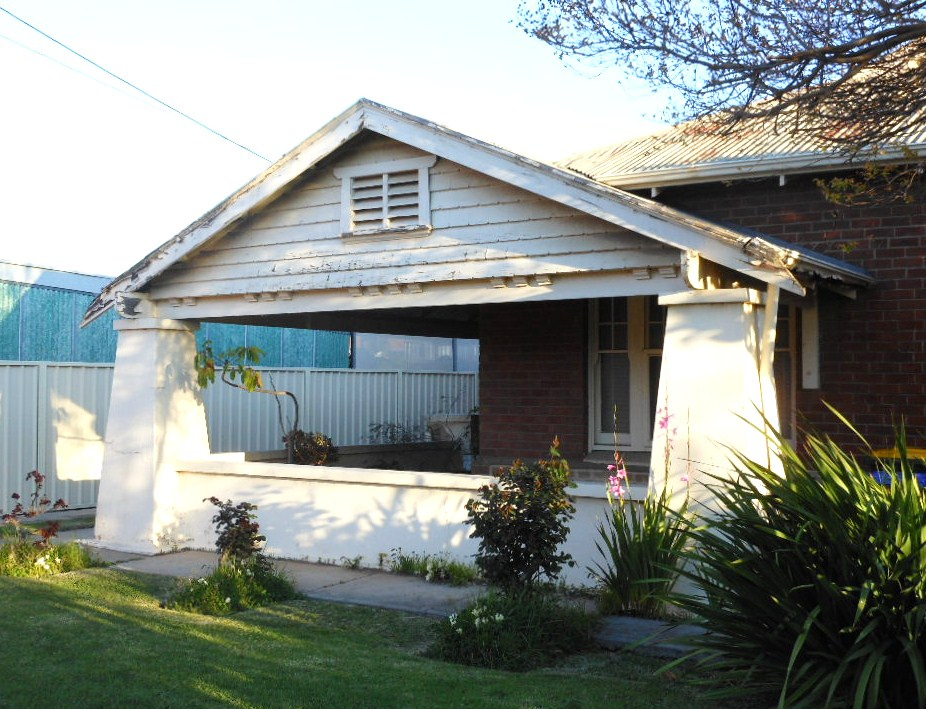
Bungalow with the characteristic verandah in Pennington

==== Inter-war Old English ====
The Old English style involved a certain nostalgia for English ways, and tended to draw on Tudor and such-like English styles harking back vaguely to the days of Henry VIII. It had a certain appeal for what was a predominantly Anglo-Saxon population at the time.

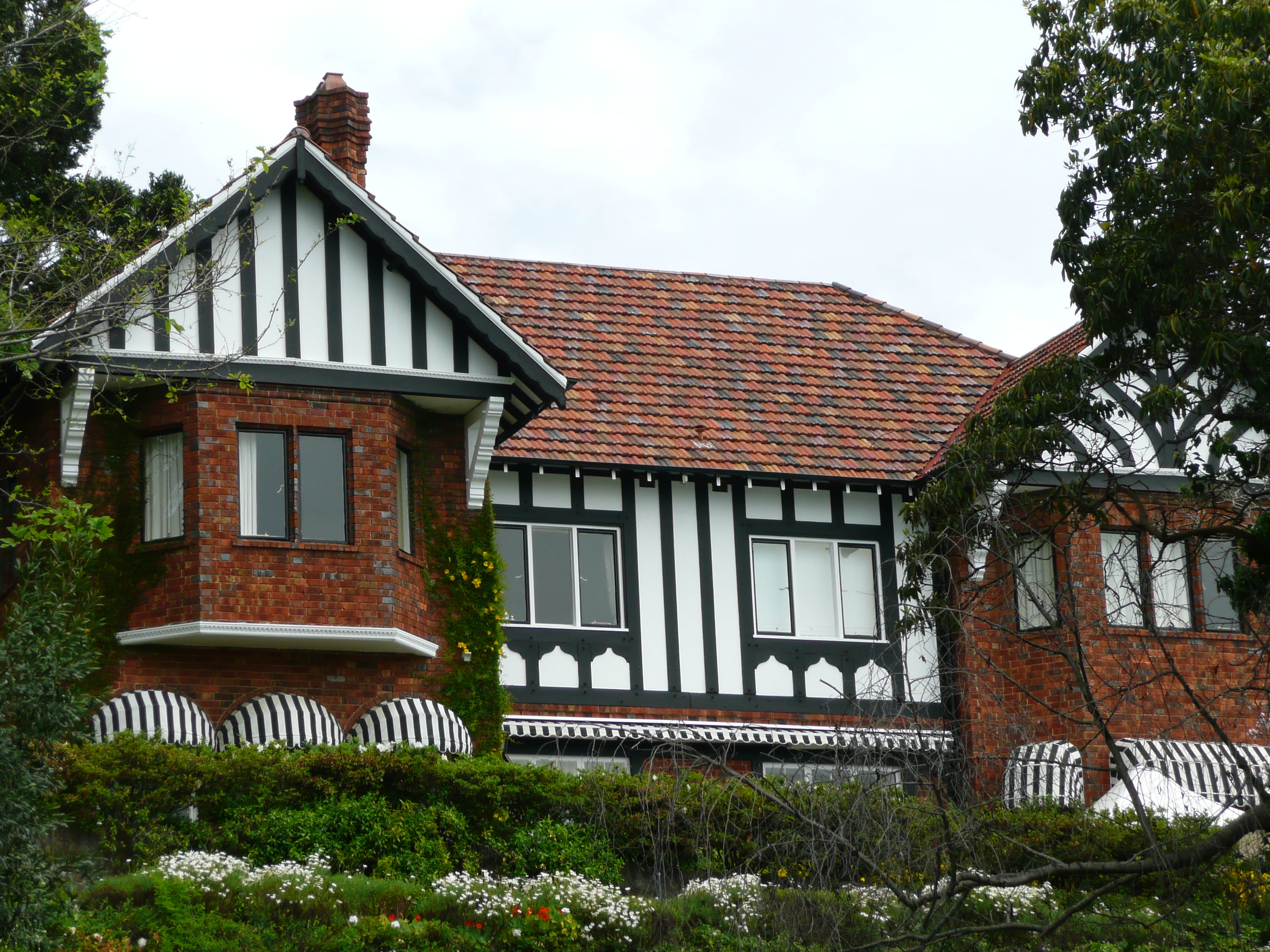
Bonnington, Bellevue Hill. Completed c. 1935.

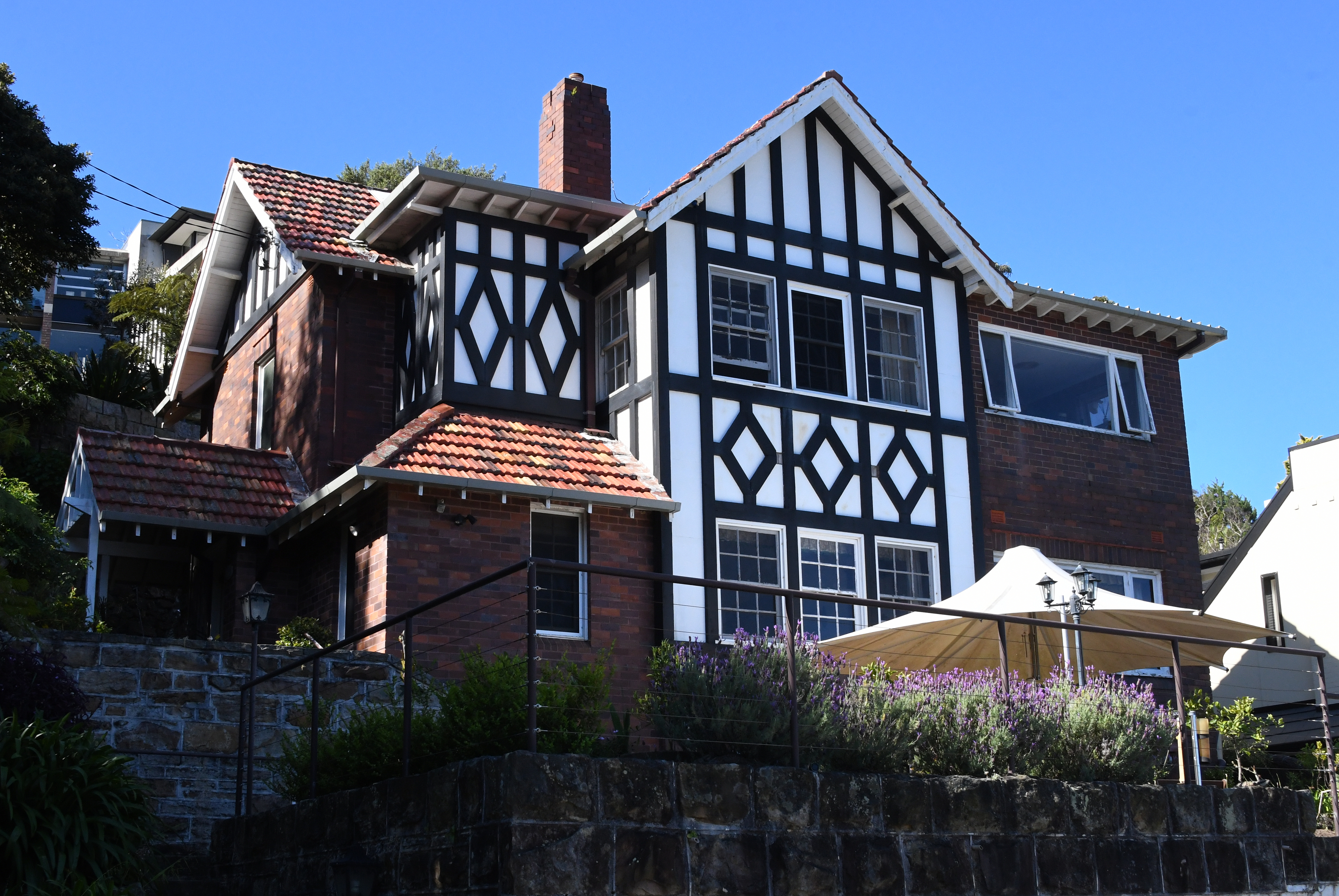
Old English style home in Mosman

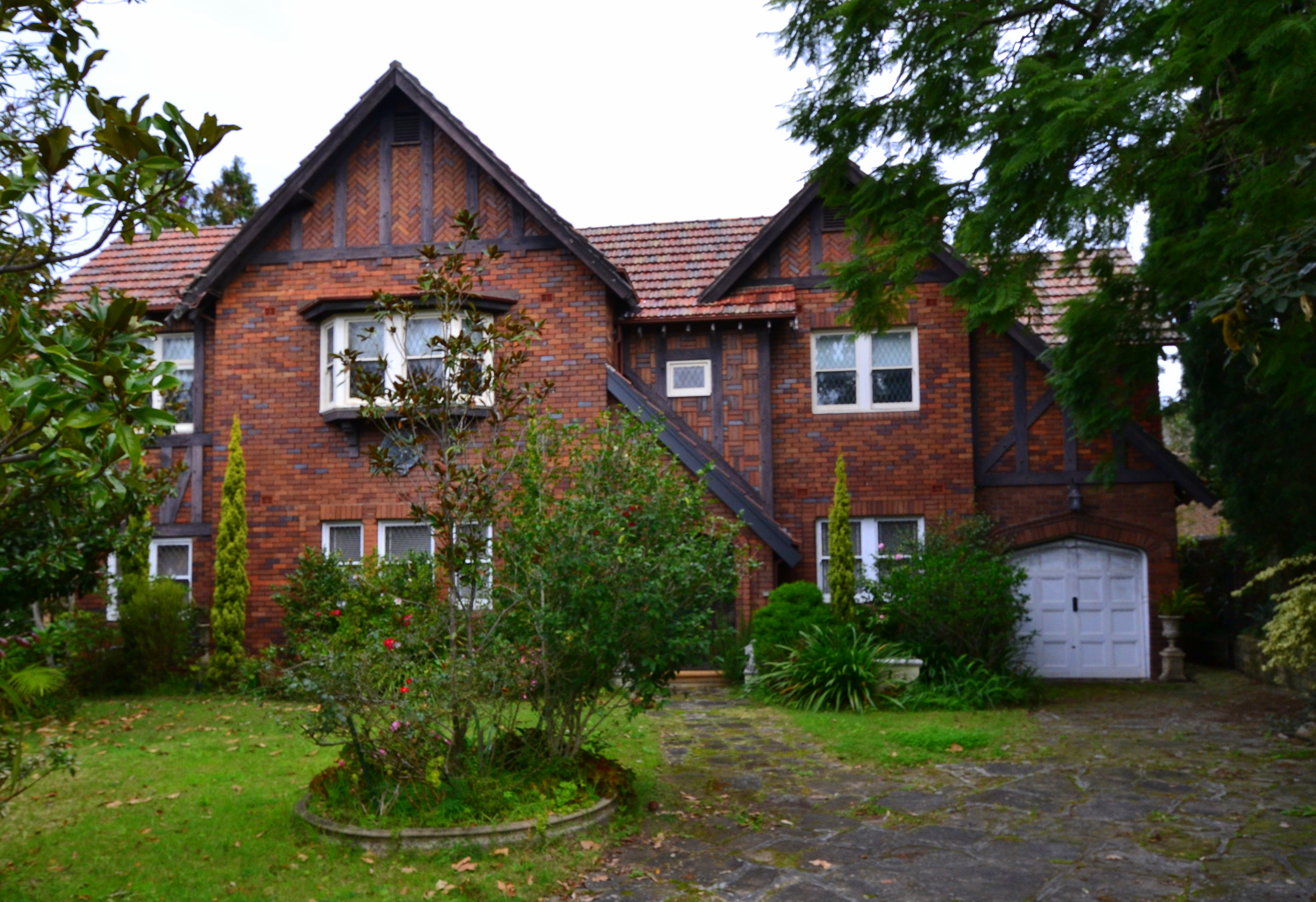
House, Pacific Highway, Turramurra.

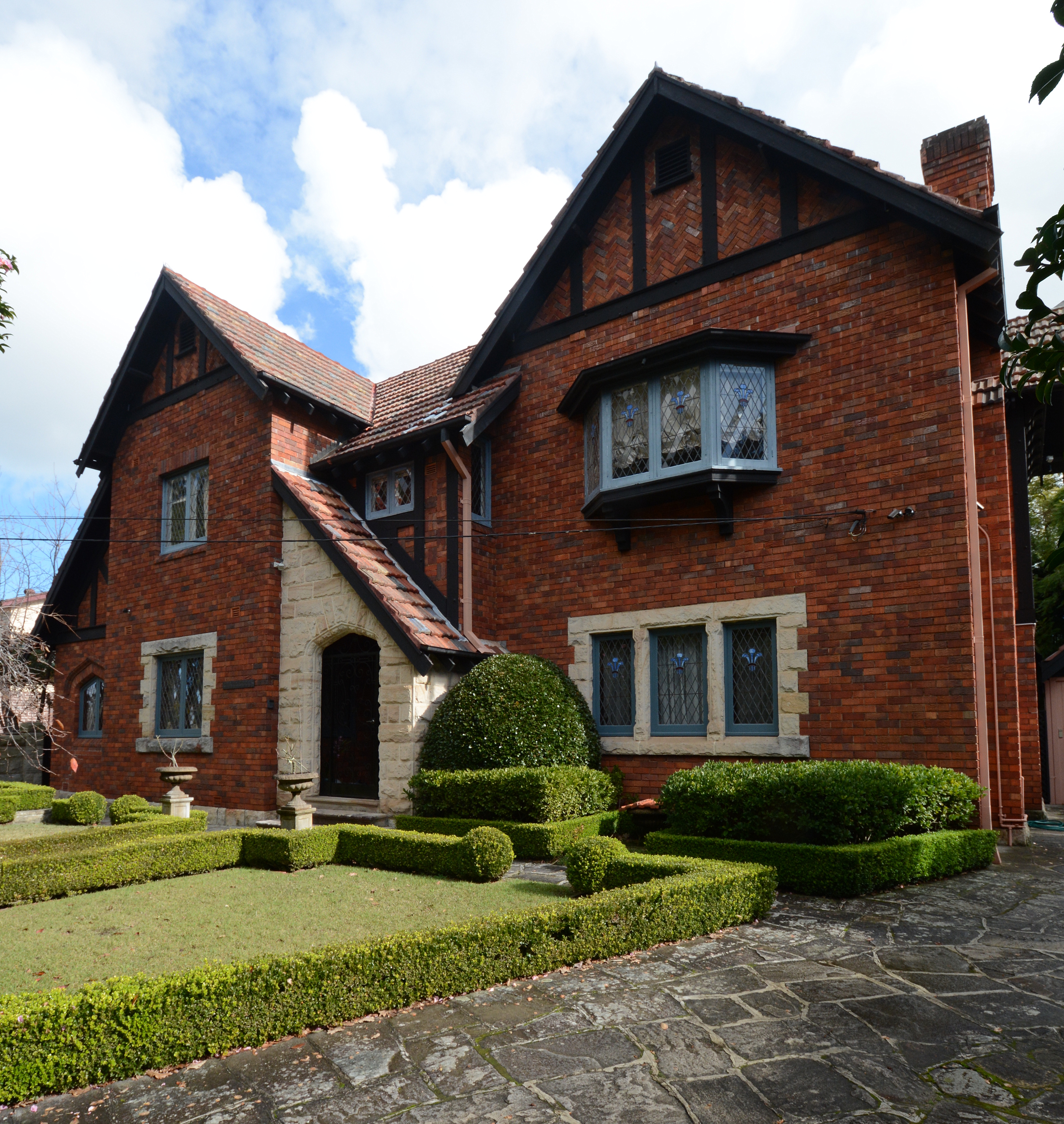
Home in Warrawee

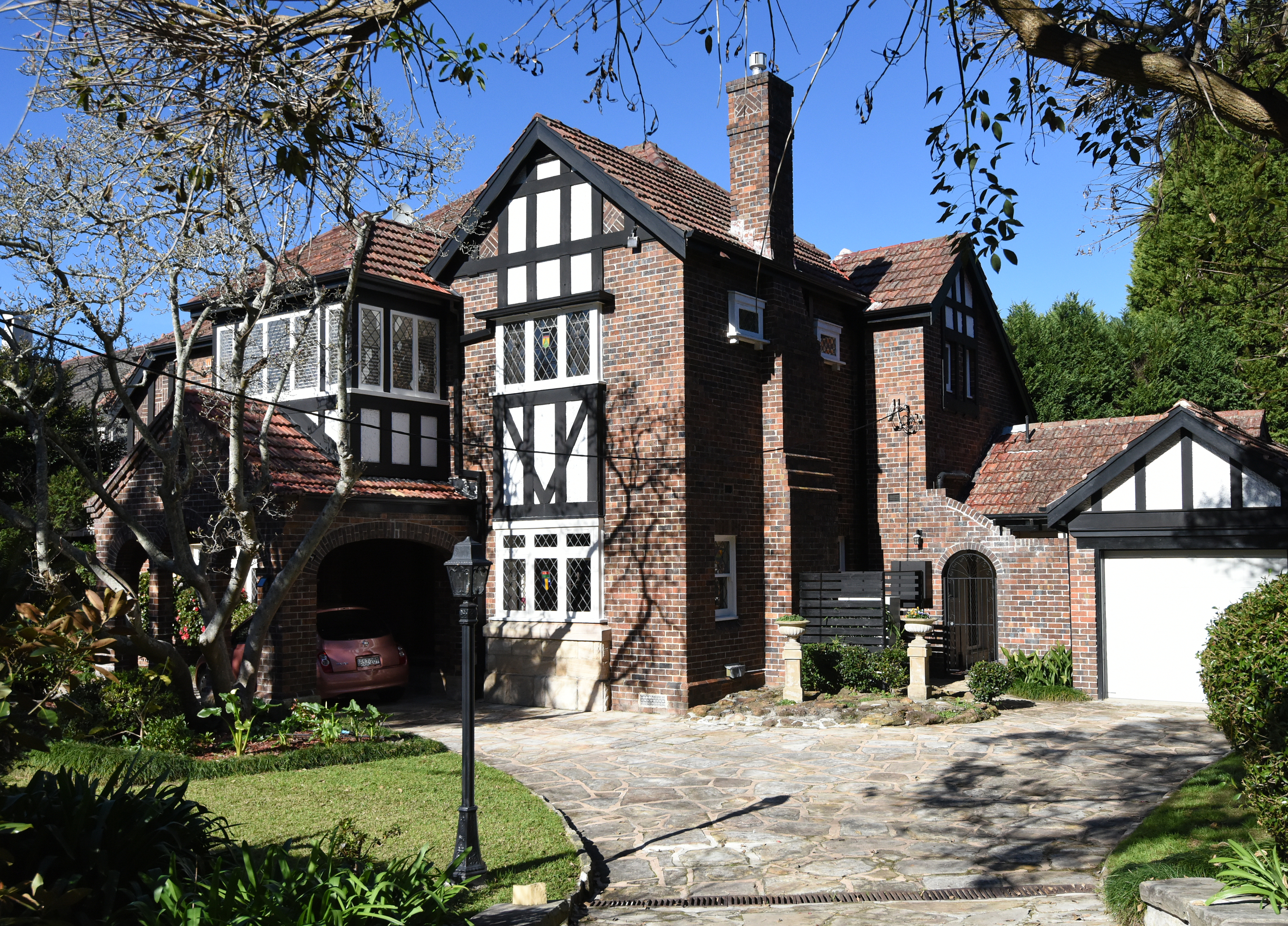
Home in Killara

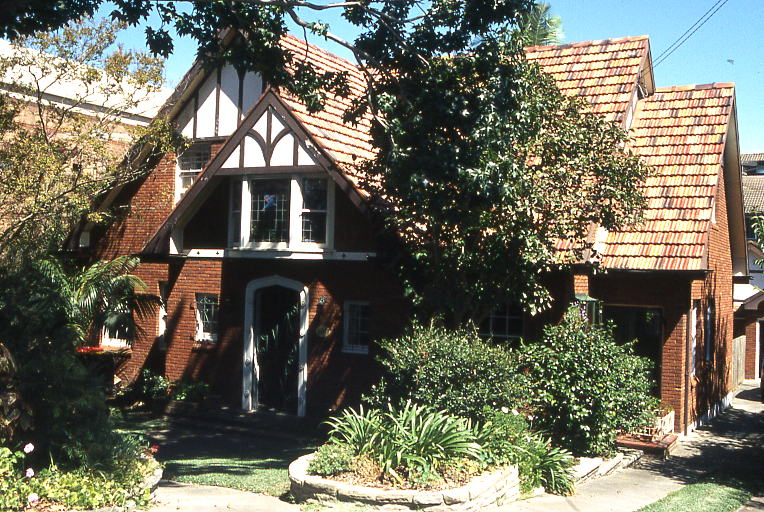
Home, Bexley Road, Bexley

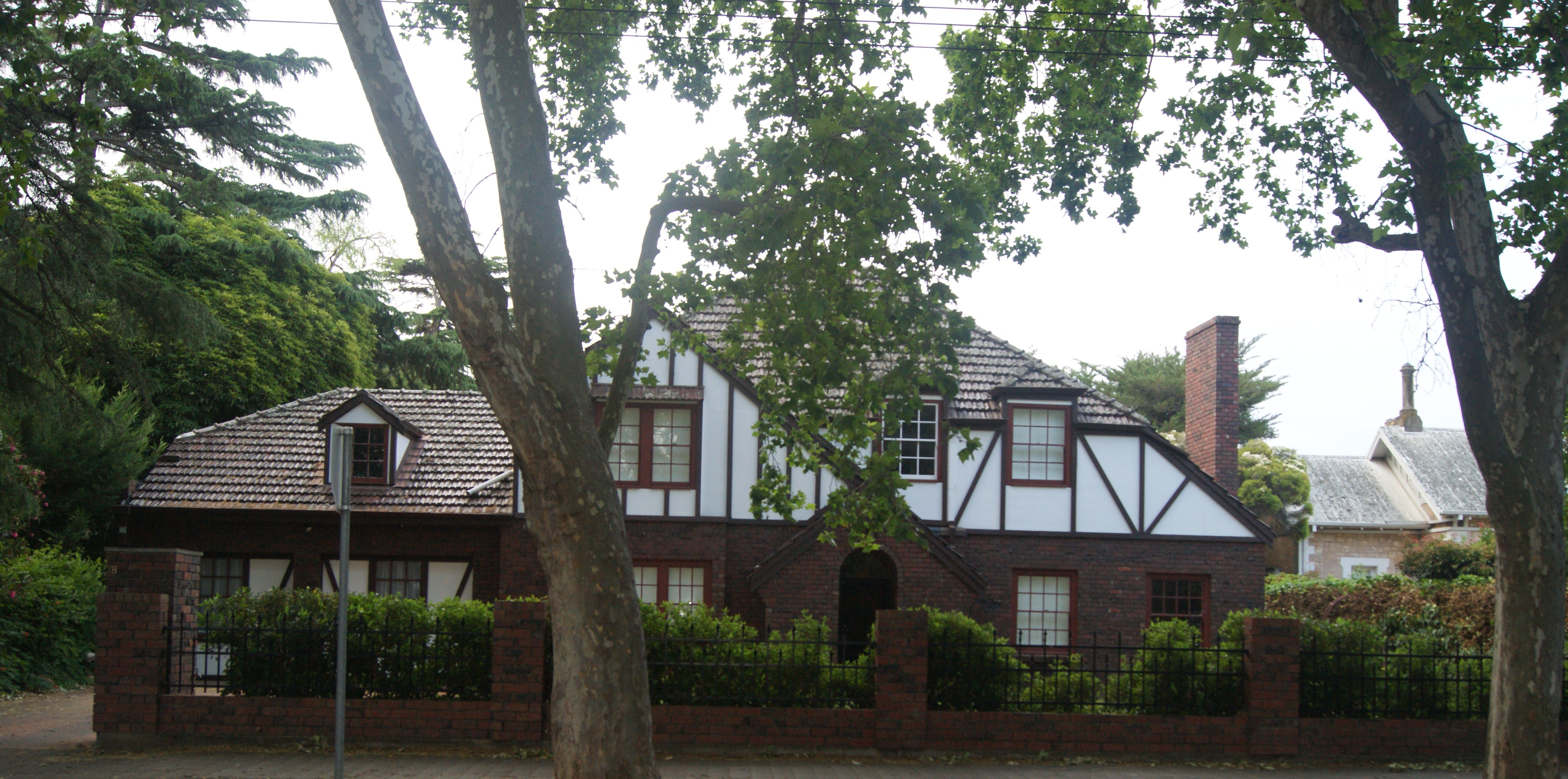
House, Unley Park

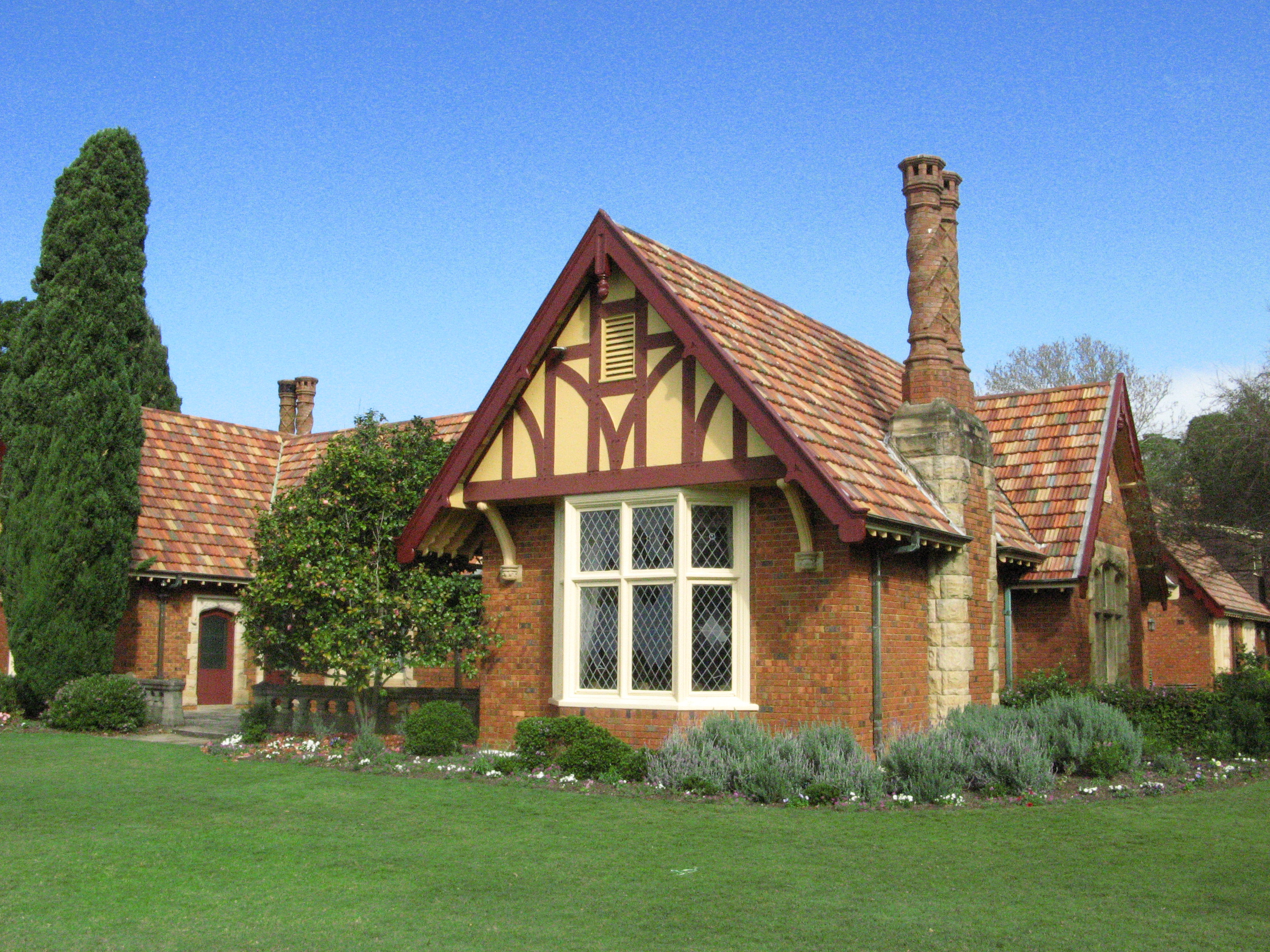
Gleniffer Brae, Keiraville

==== Inter-war Spanish Mission ====
Distinctly recognised by twisted pylons to a porch area covering the front door, usually windows grouped in threes to the side of the front door area on simpler homes. The style was influenced by the American Spanish inhabitant influenced American Architectural styles. Walls were brick in accordance with council regulations at the time, with white or cream yellowish cream stucco finish and Spanish terra cotta tiles.

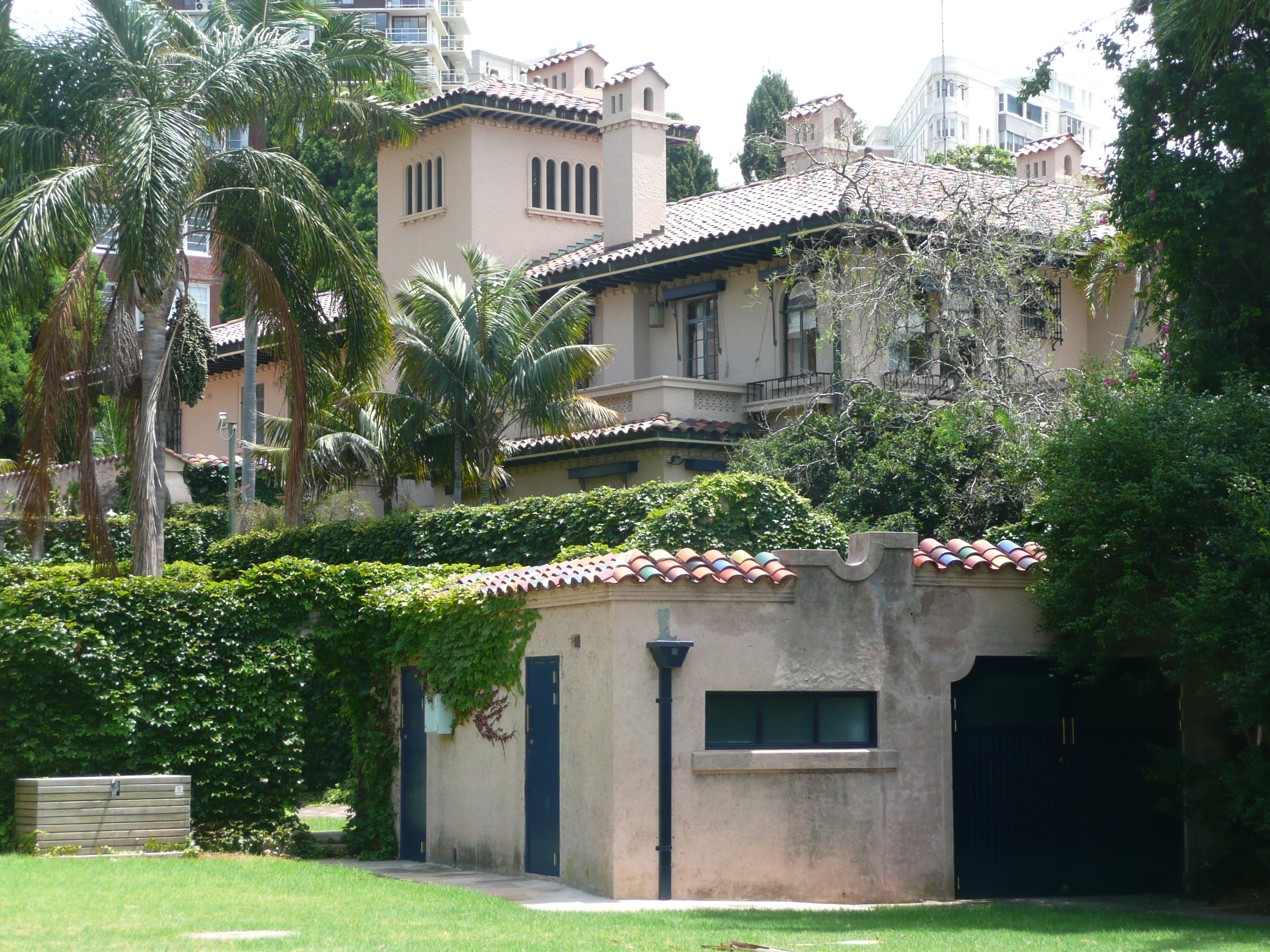
Boomerang, Elizabeth Bay; built from 1926 to 1928. Neville Hampson, architect; gardens and grounds by Max Shelley (possibly in conjunction with Hampson and A. J. Doust).

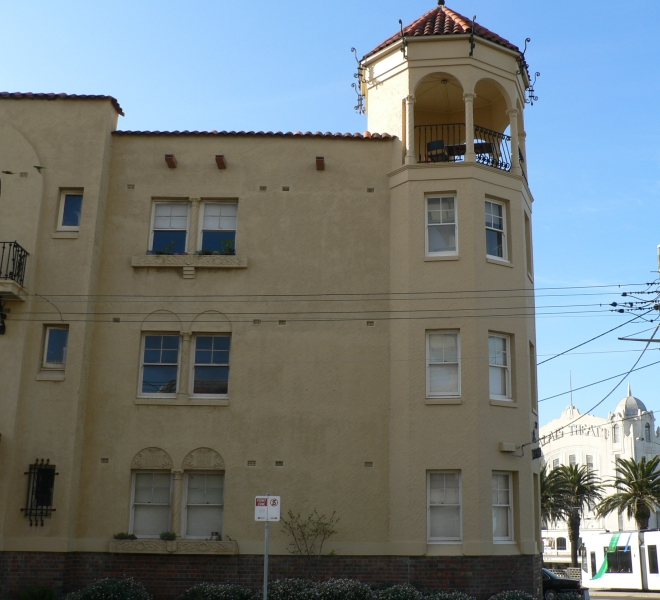
Belvedere Flats, St Kilda; completed in 1929. William H. Merritt, architect; J.R & E. Secull, builders.

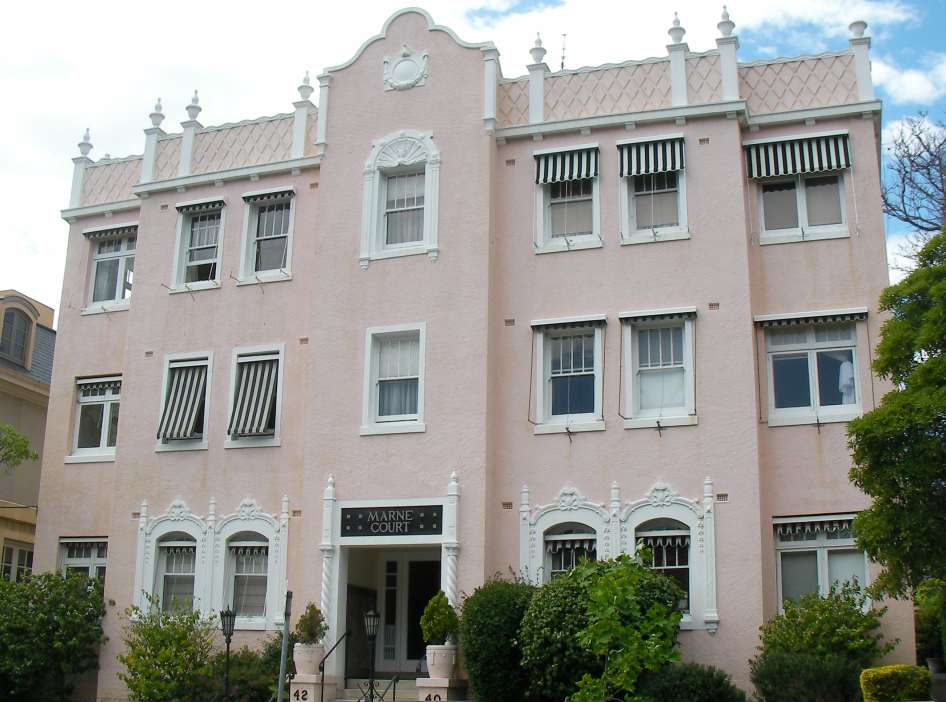
Marne Court, South Yarra; built c. 1929.

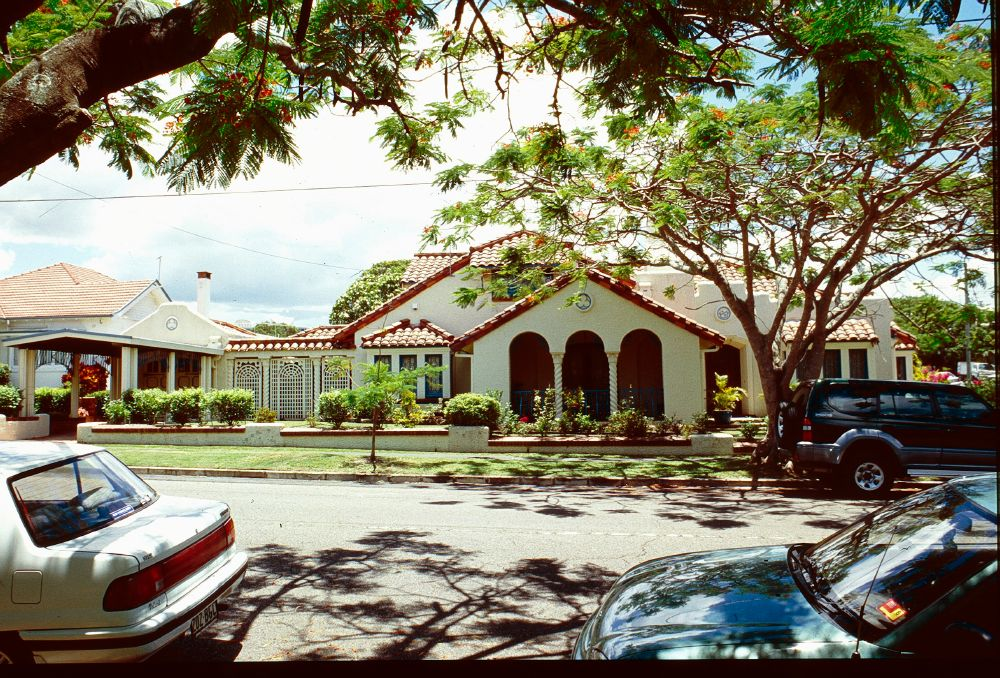
Santa Barbara, New Farm; built from 1929 to 1930; Eric Percival Trewern, architect; D.F Roberts, builder.

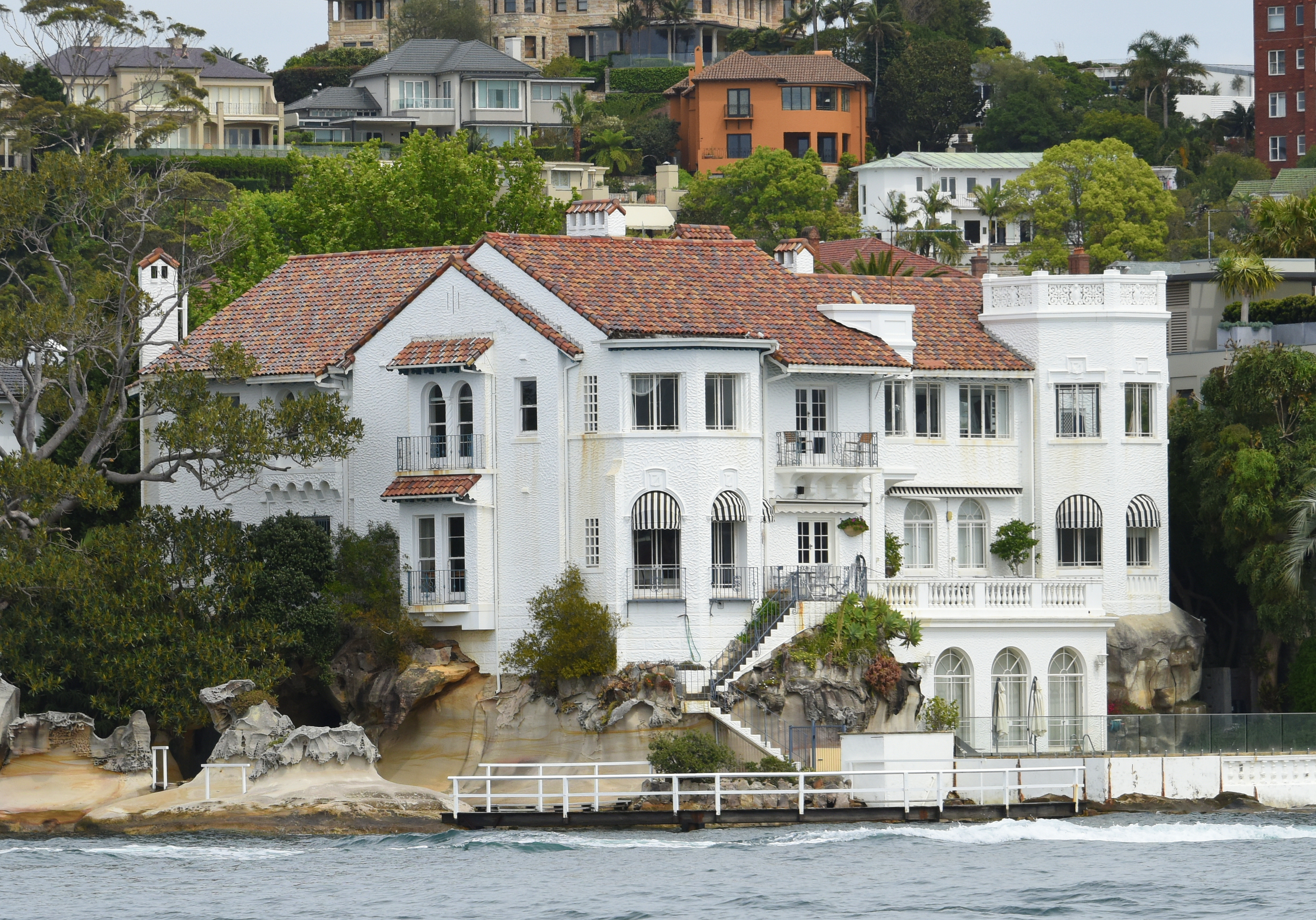
Herewai, Point Piper; completed in 1930; Ross & Rowe, architects, most likely by H.E. Ross.

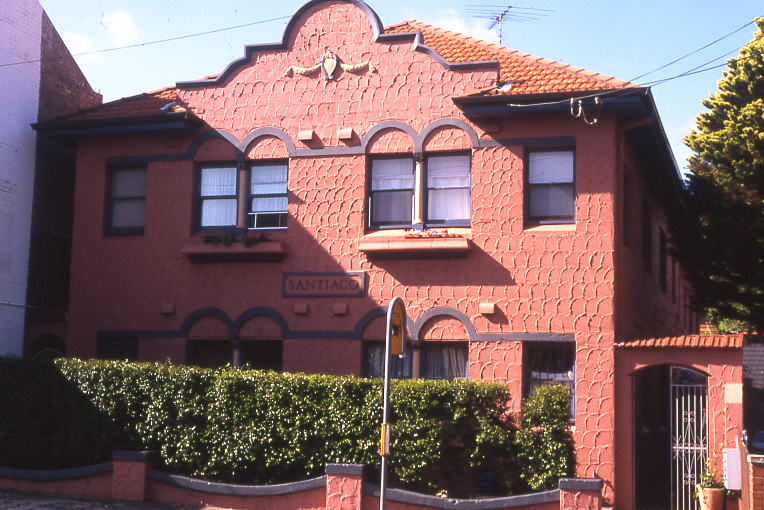
Santiago, Kingsford; architect and date unknown, completed before 1938

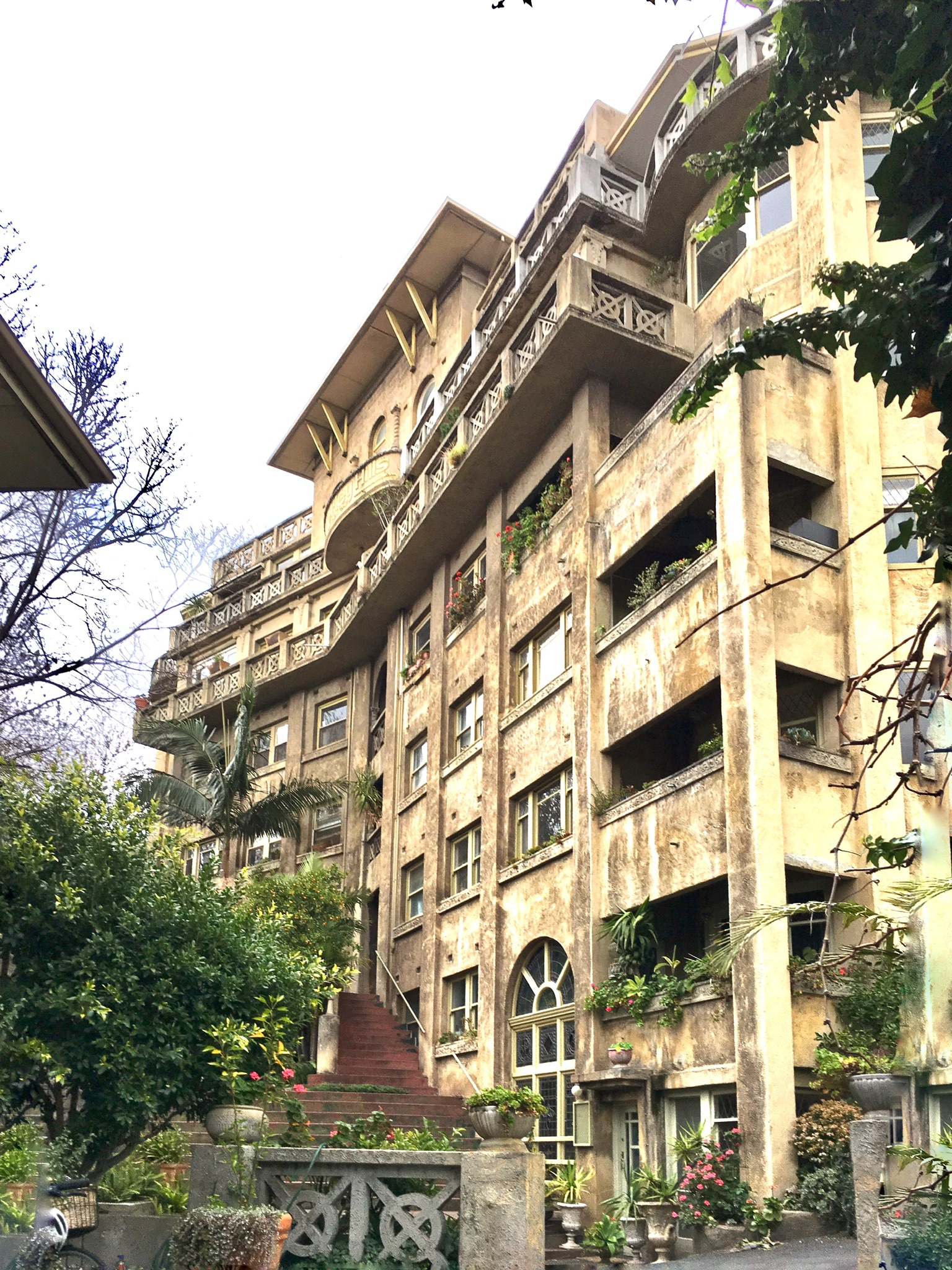
Beverley Hills Apartment Blocks, South Yarra (1930s) Howard Ratcliff Lawson

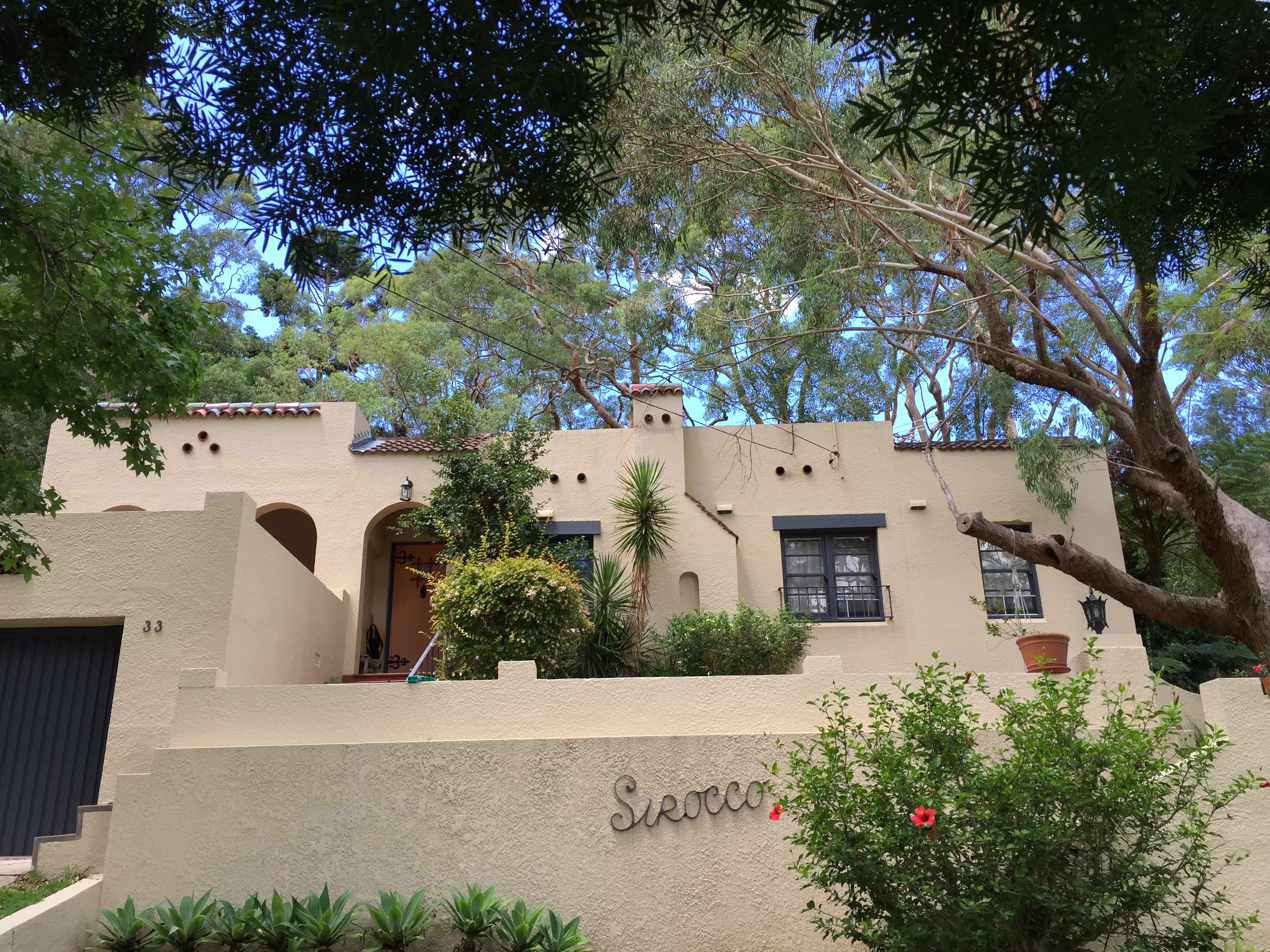
Siroccoro, Roseville; built 1938; Stanley Rickard, architect; Garetti & Son, builders.

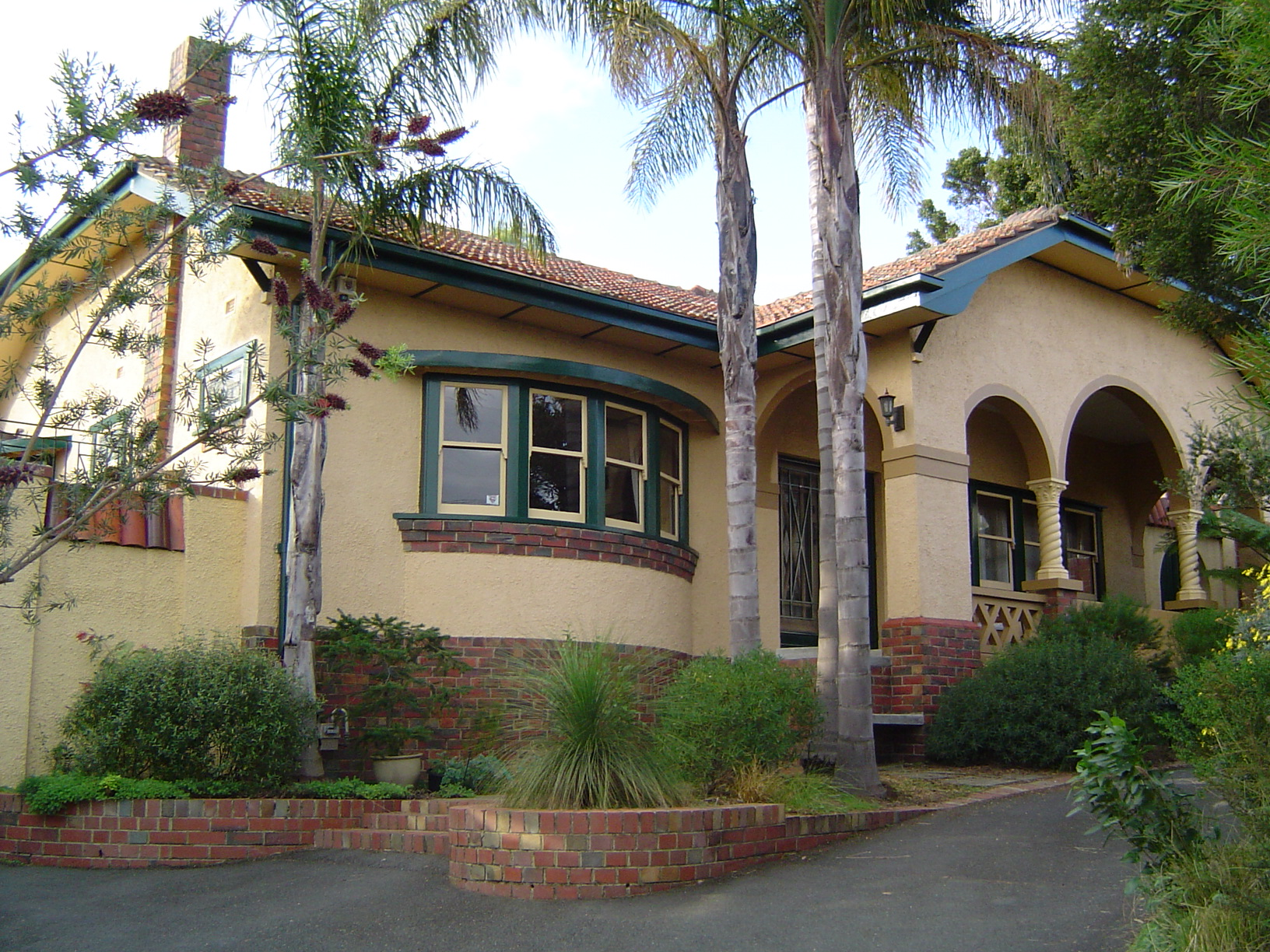
Spanish Mission home in Heidelberg

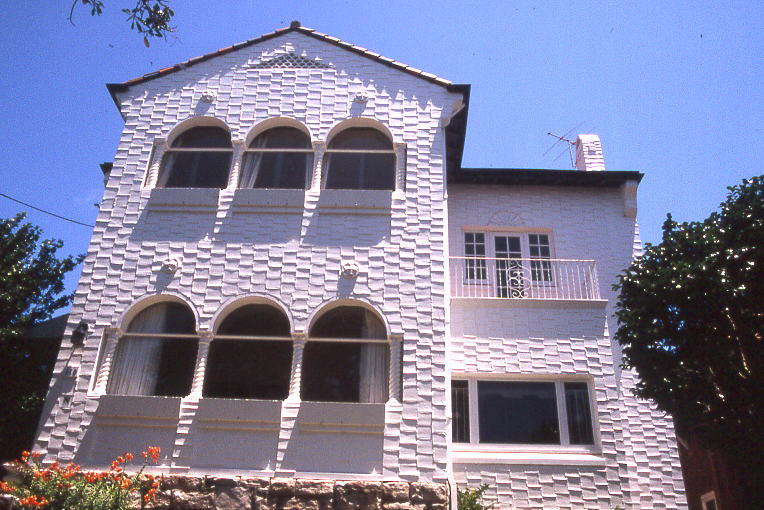
Home, Bellevue Hill

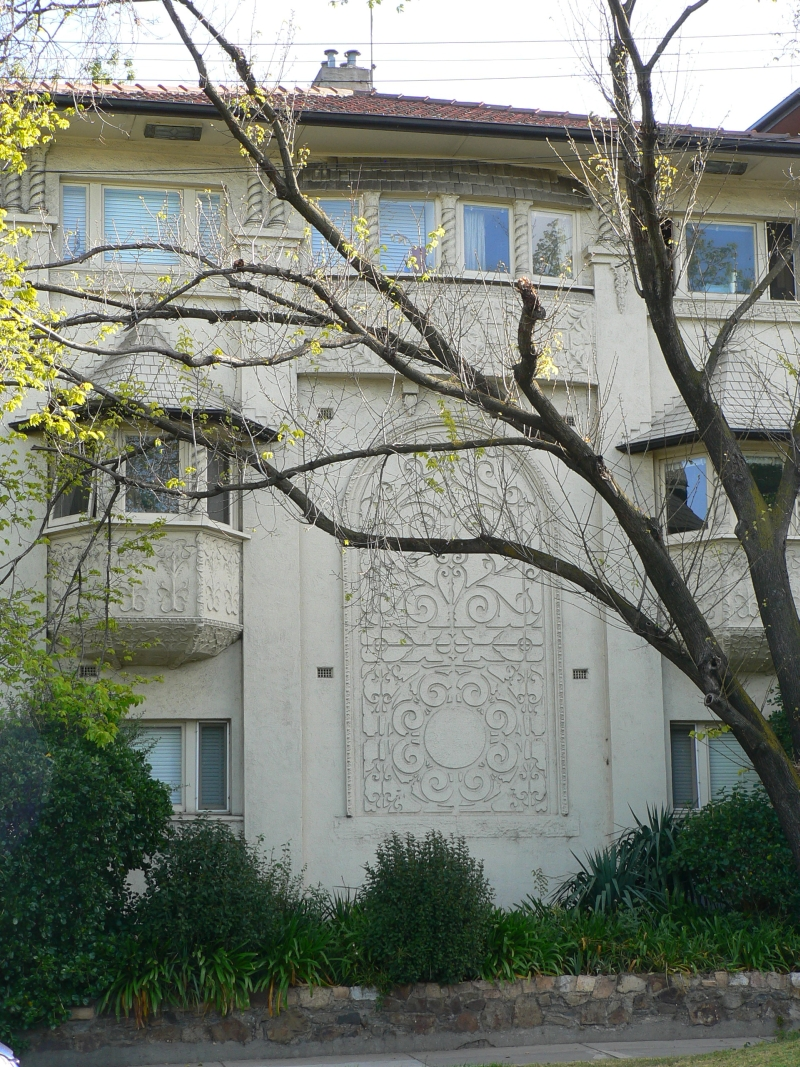
Apartment complex, Alexandra Parade, South Yarra

Las Palmas, St Kilda

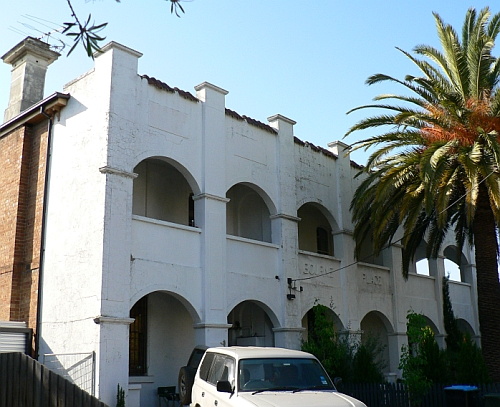
Bourne Place, Remodelled Terraces, Windsor

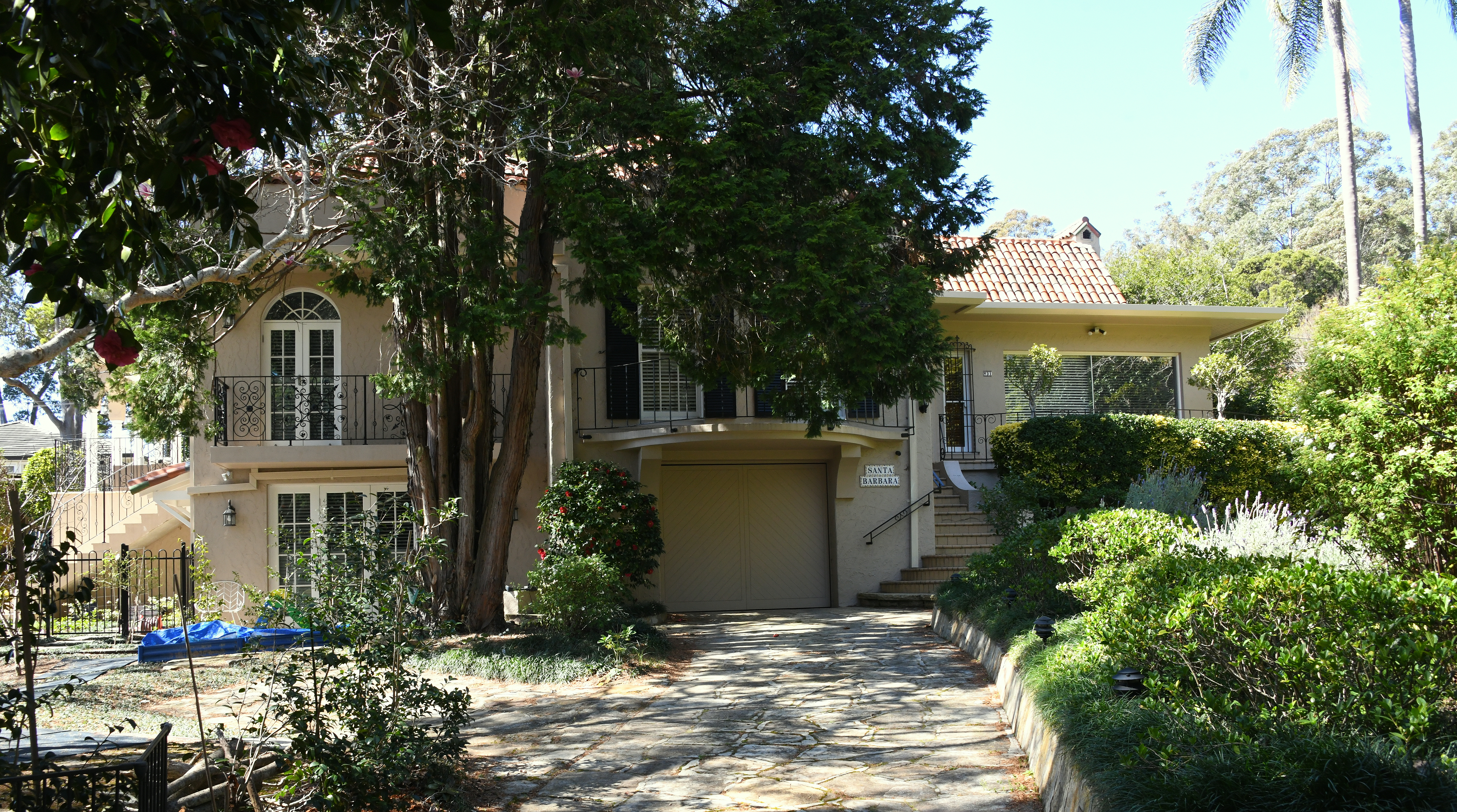
Santa Barbara, Pymble, Stanley Rickard, architect

==== Inter-war Georgian Revival ====
A revival of Old Colonial Georgian and Old Colonial Regency architecture. Largely spearheaded by William Hardy Wilson, and inspired by the Georgian revival architecture of the United States and Britain.

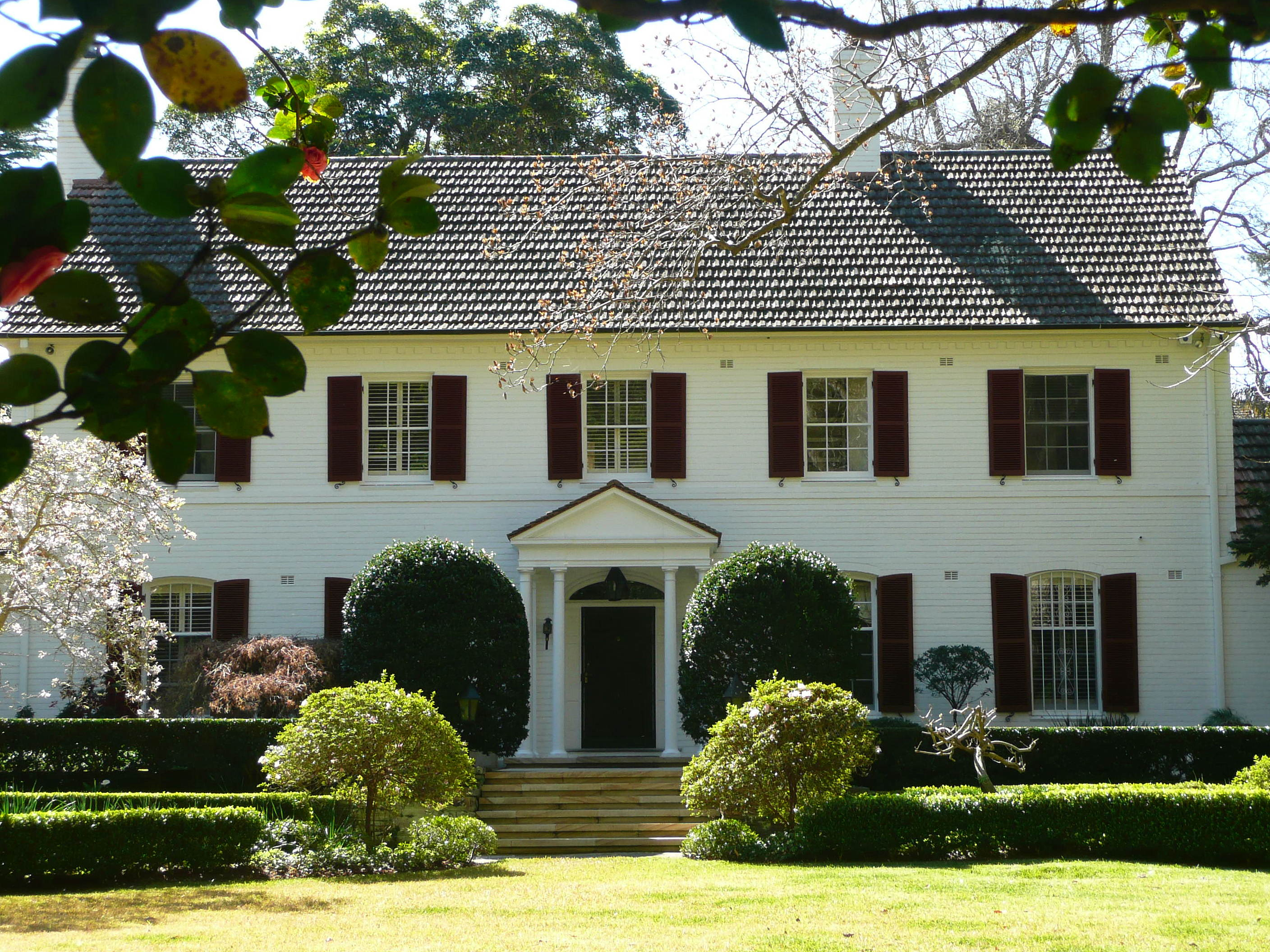
Georgian Revival house in Wahroonga

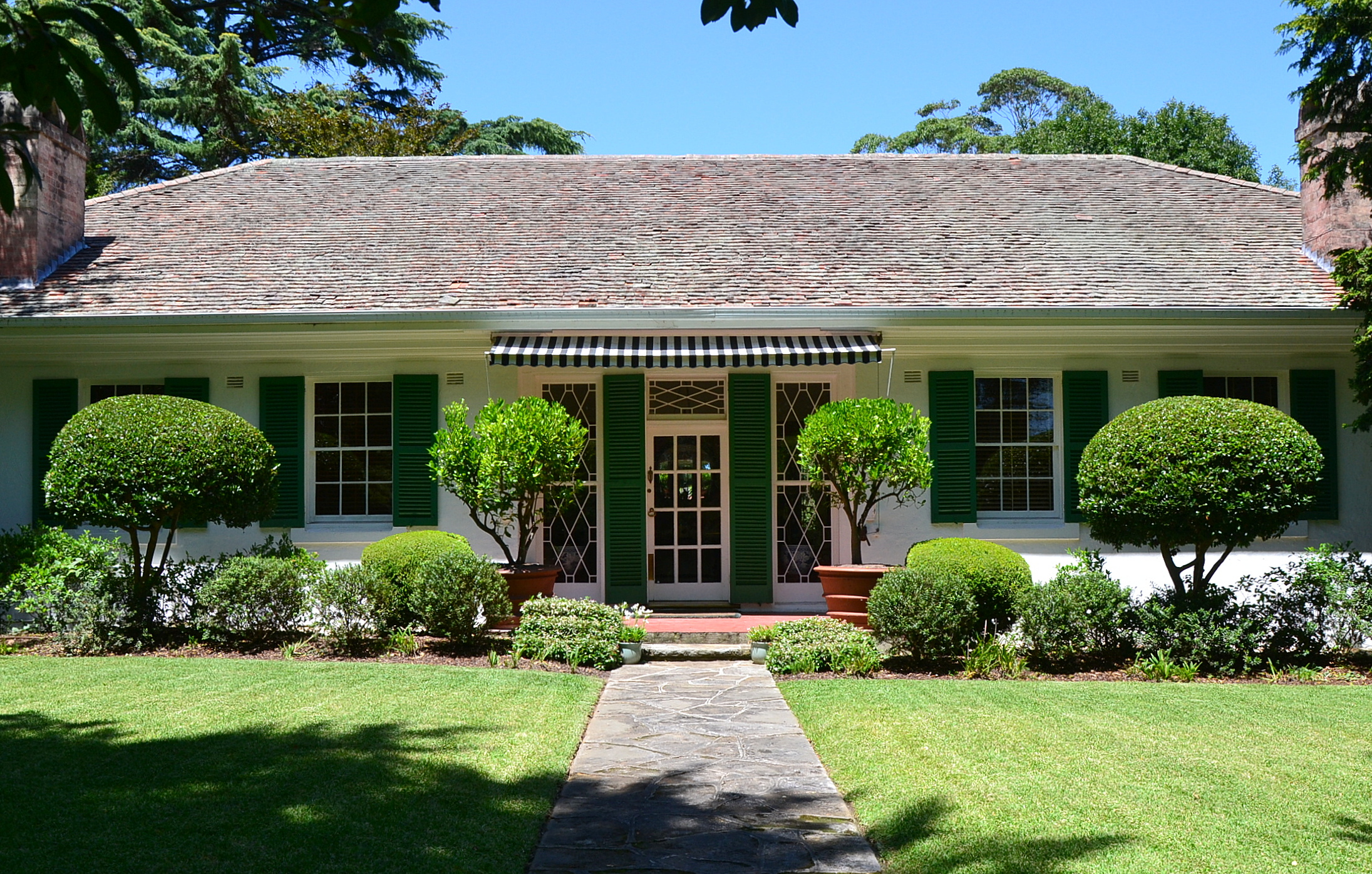
Purulia, Wahroonga; constructed 1912–13; architect, William Hardy Wilson.

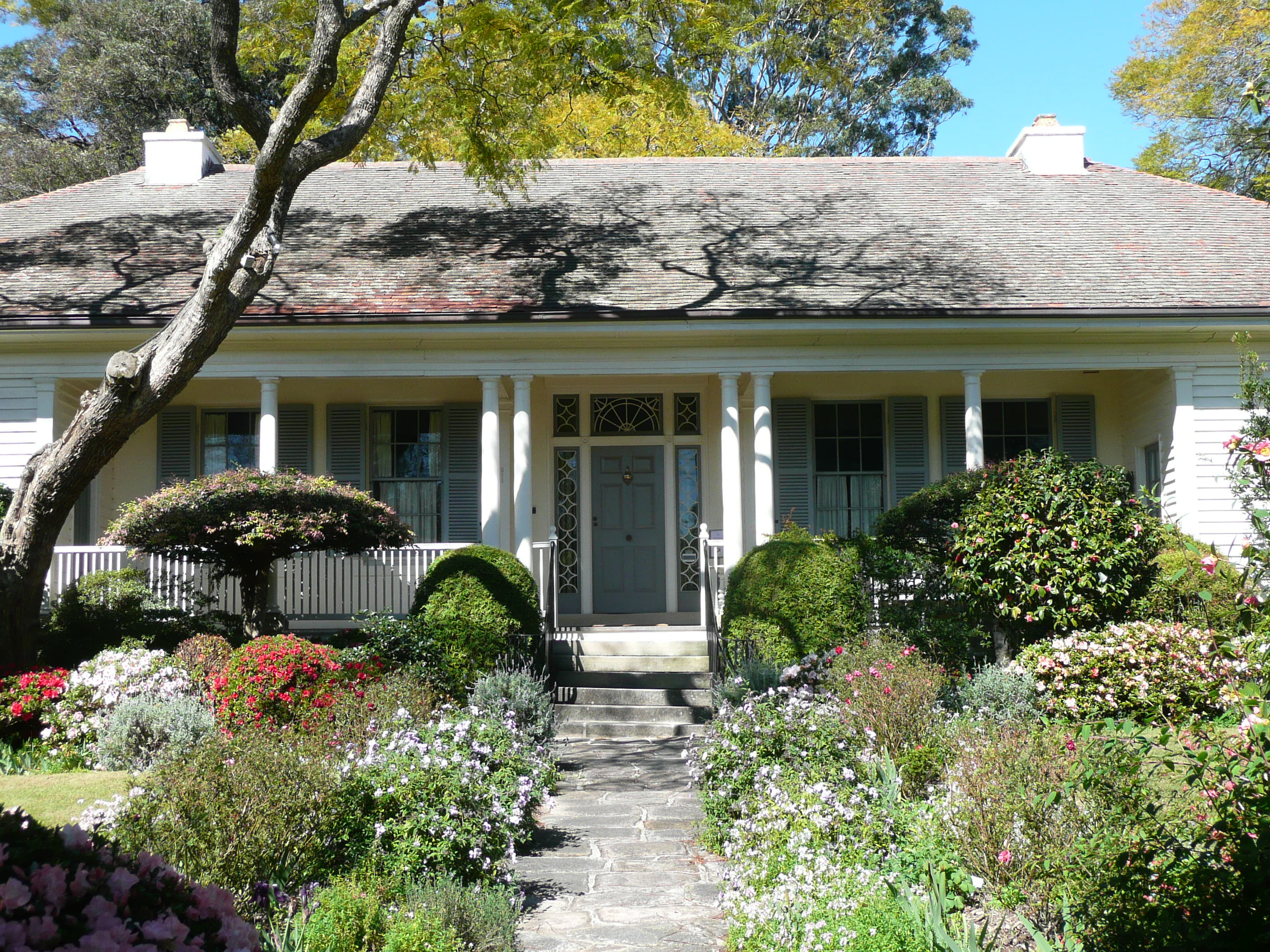
Eryldene, Gordon. Completed 1914. Designed by William Hardy Wilson.

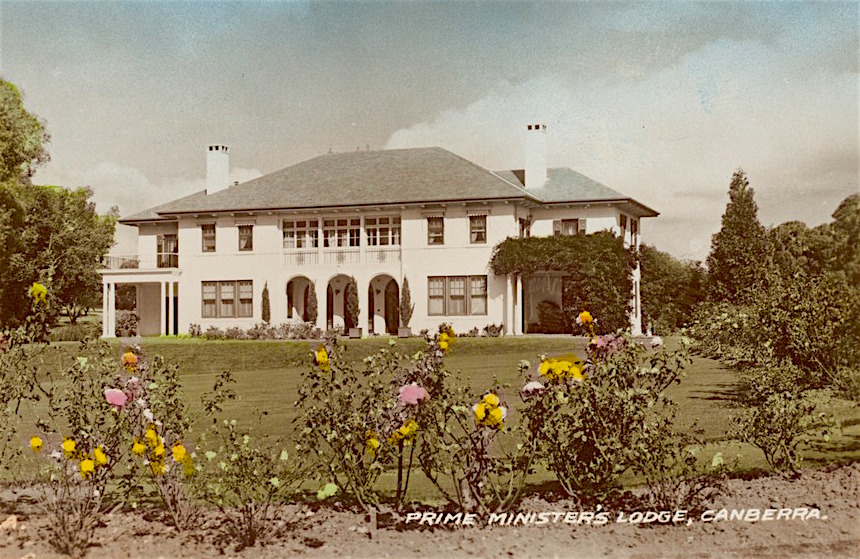
The Lodge, Canberra, completed 1927. Residence of the Prime Minister of Australia.

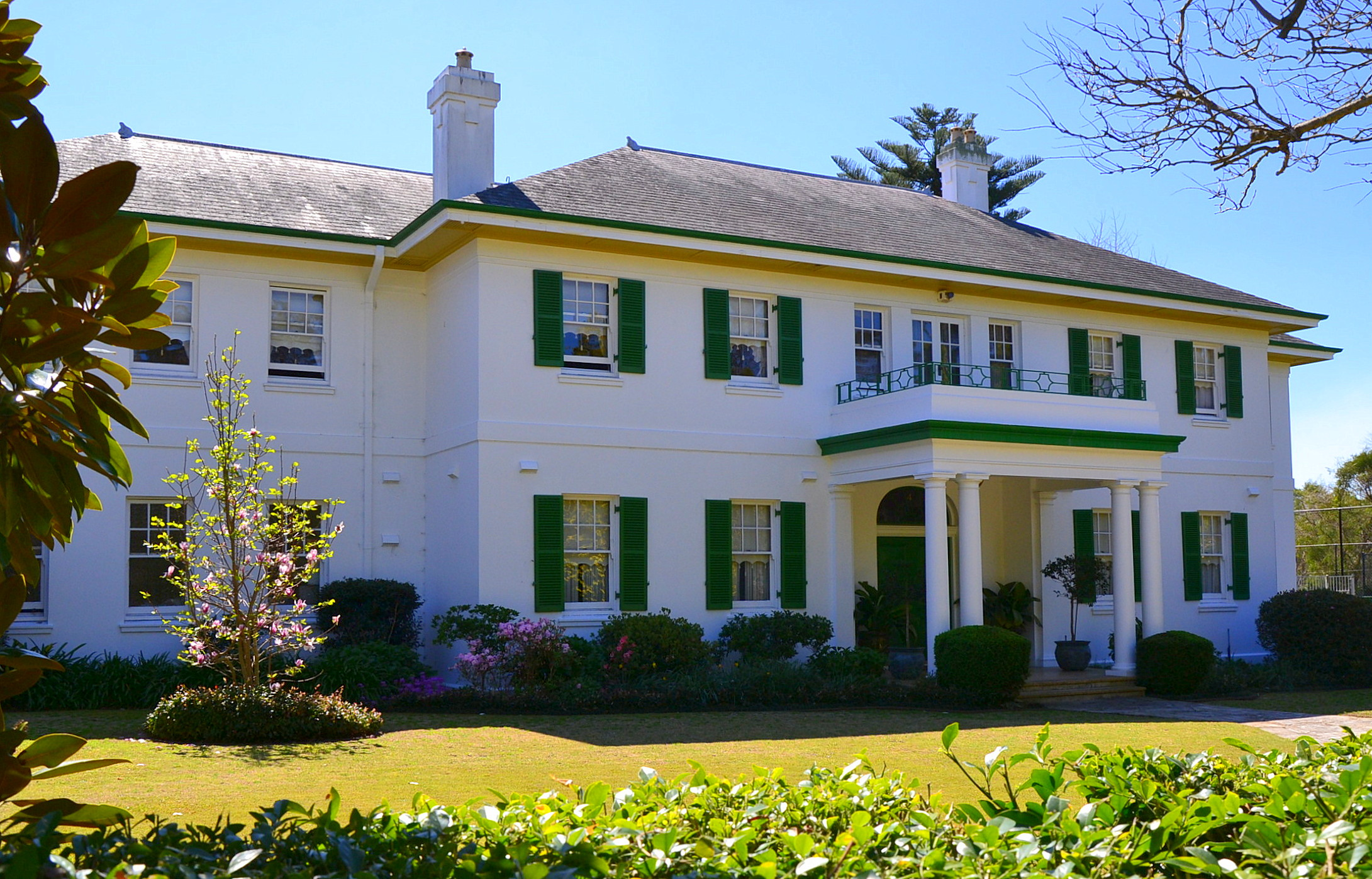
Merrivale, Pymble. Completed 1930.

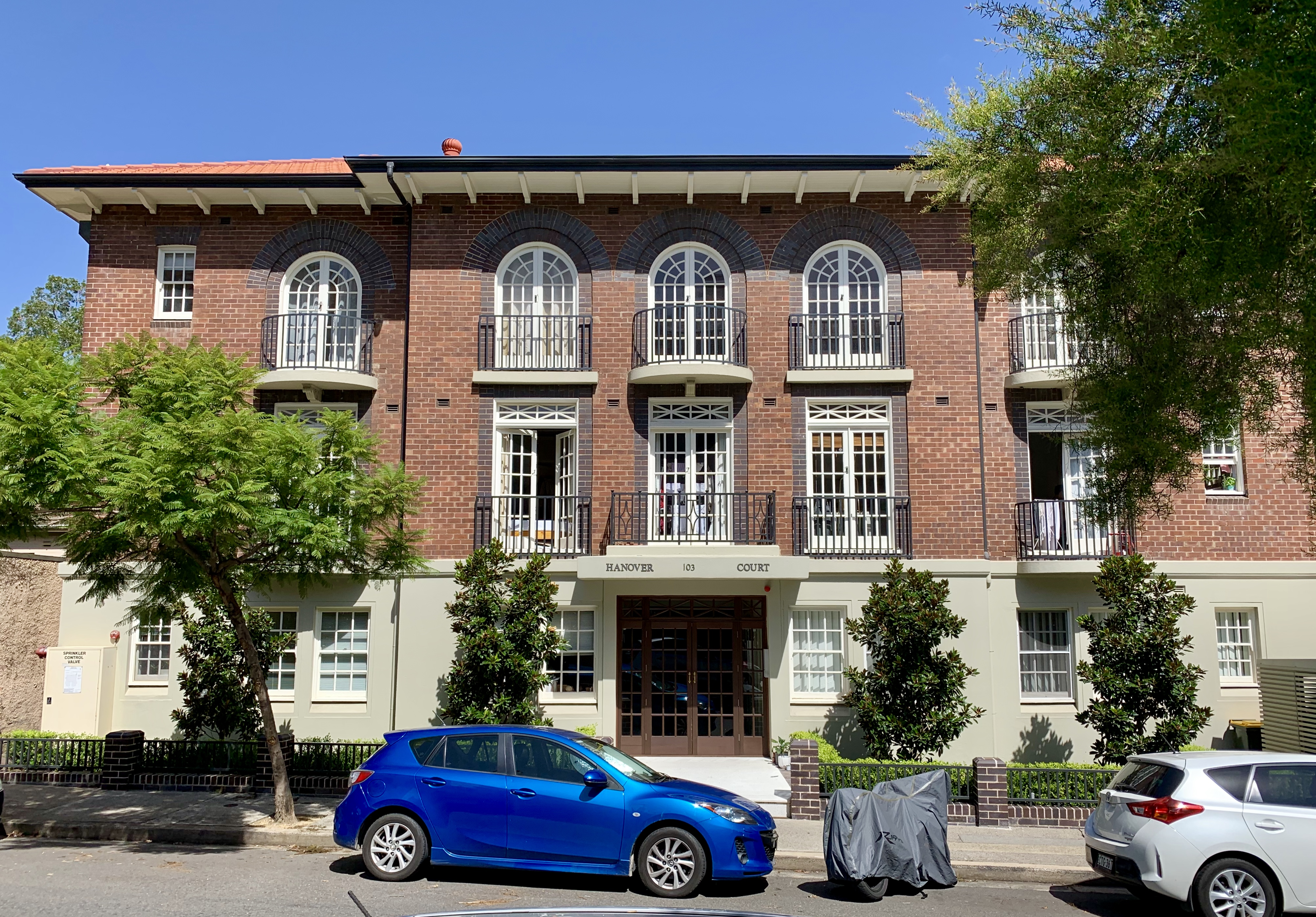
Hanover Court flats, Kirribilli.

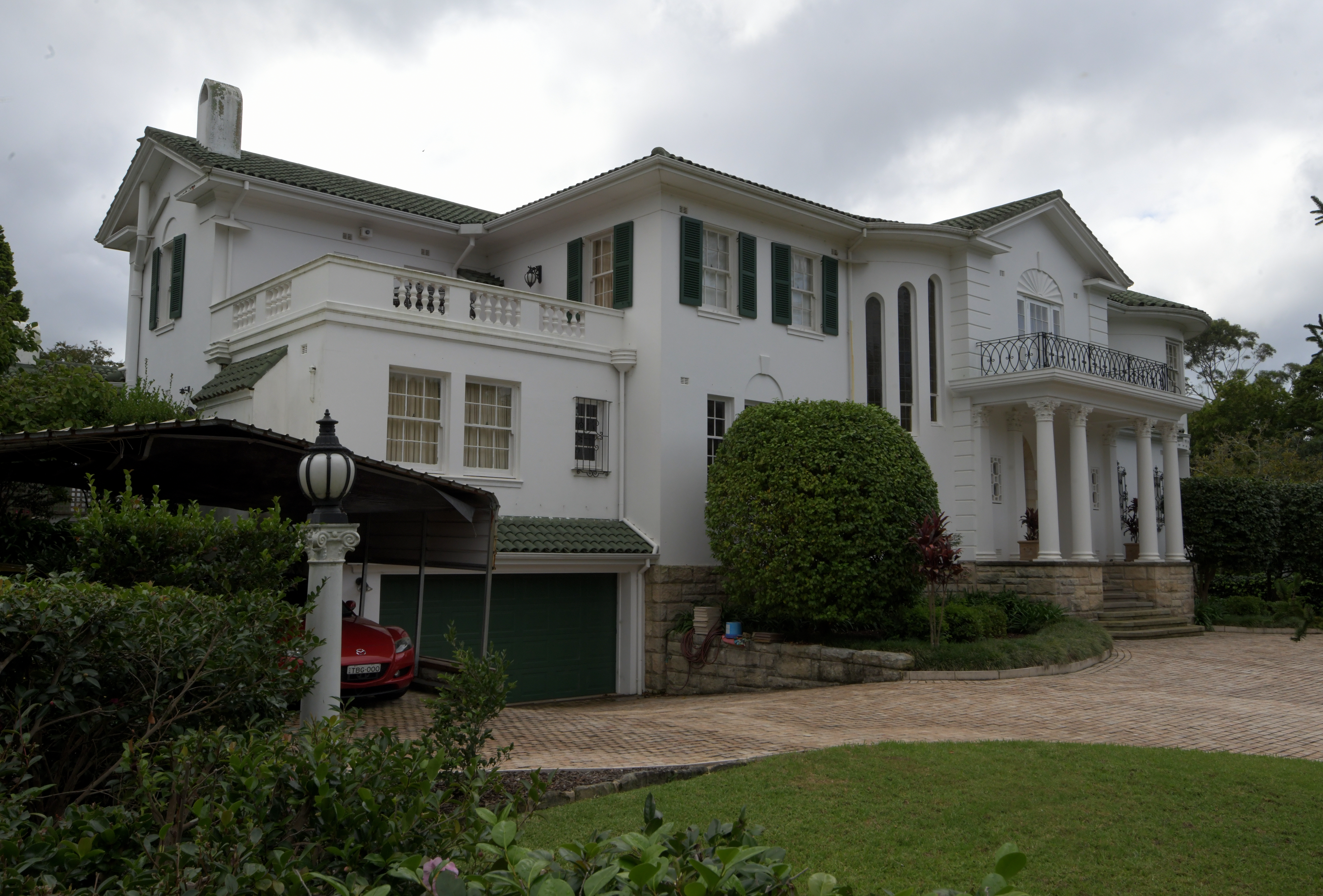
Audley, Warrawee. Completed 1935

==== Inter-war Functionalist ====
Inter-war Functionalism was a modern looking style at the time, inspired by a German movement known as Bauhaus, representing functional and clinical architecture. Red or cream brick walls and concrete was also first seen. Steel-framed casement sashes, with larger panes of glass and terra cotta tiled roofs with a moderate pitch. The only featured part of the house included matching decorative front fences, and a featured roof affect. Buildings in this style sometimes were influenced by the Streamline Moderne style, itself a late branch of Art Deco architecture. Inspired by aerodynamic design, the style emphasised curving forms, long horizontal lines, and sometimes nautical elements, such as railings and porthole windows.

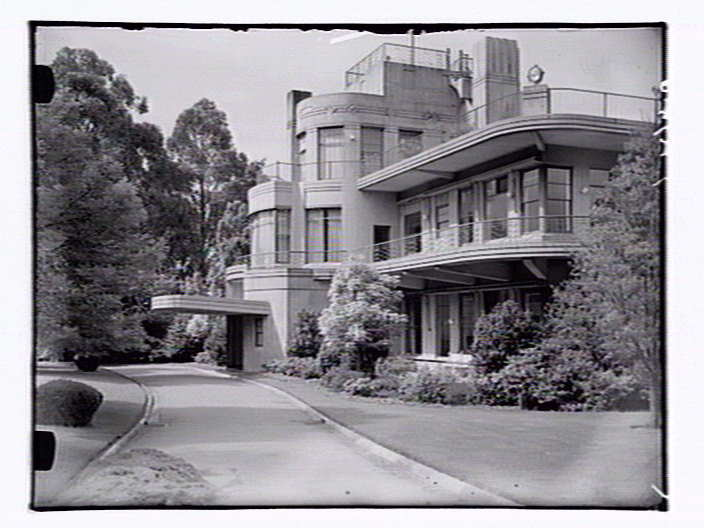
Burnham Beeches, Dandenong Ranges; completed 1933; Harry Norris, architect.

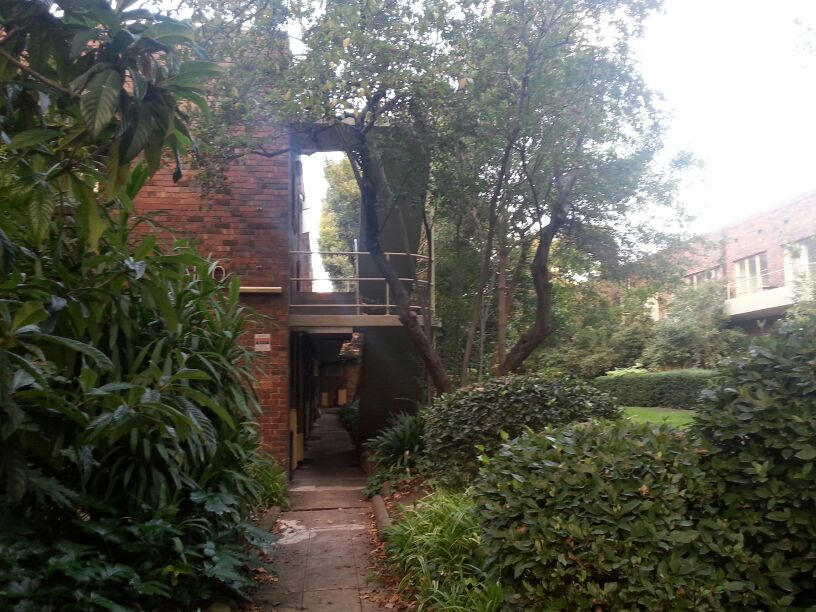
Cairo Flats, Fitzroy. Completed in 1936; Best Overend, architect. Each apartment was designed to "provide maximum amenity in minimum space for minimum rent".

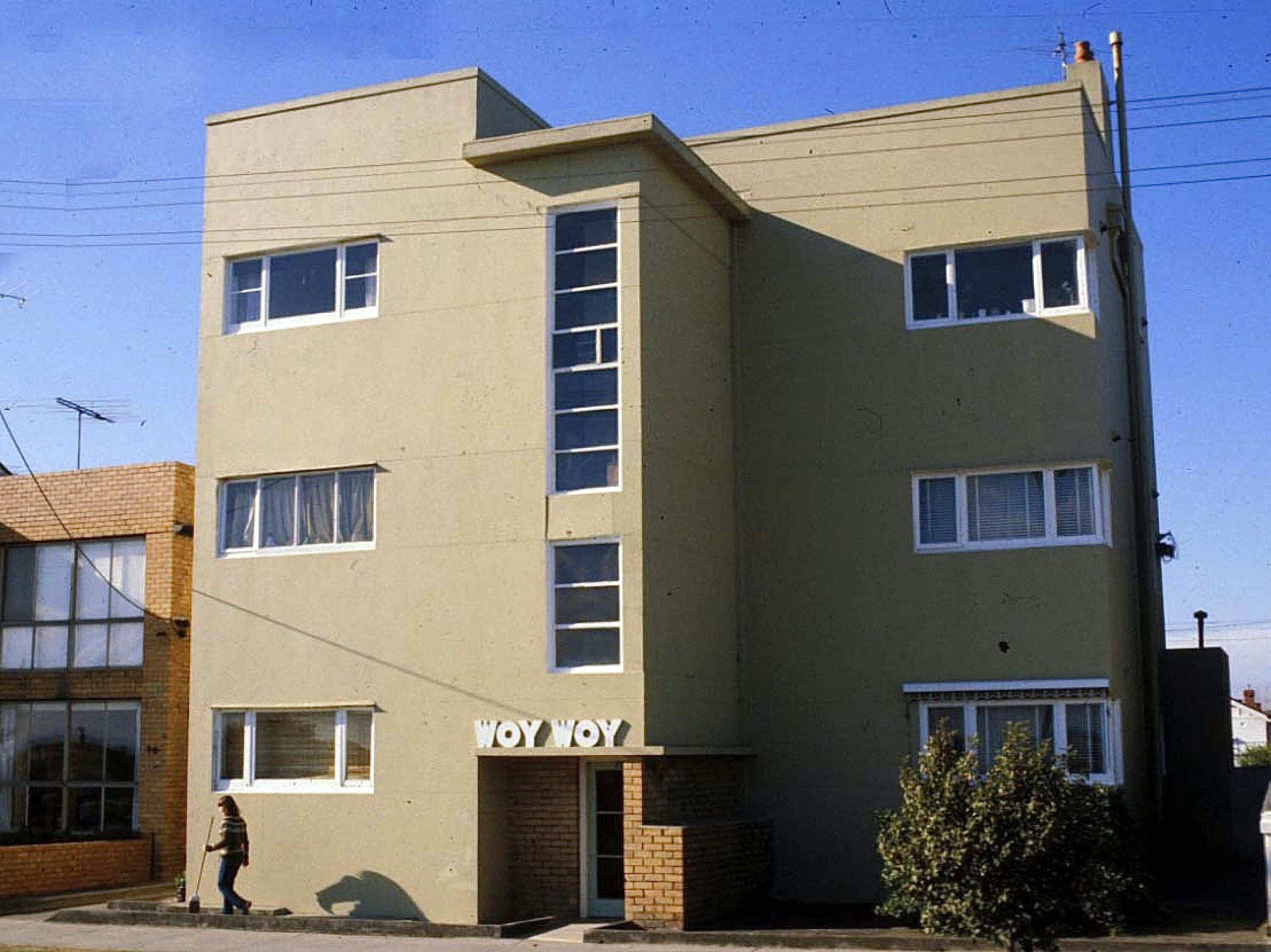
Woy Woy Flats, Elwood; built 1936. Mewton & Grounds, attributed to Geoffrey Harley Mewton.

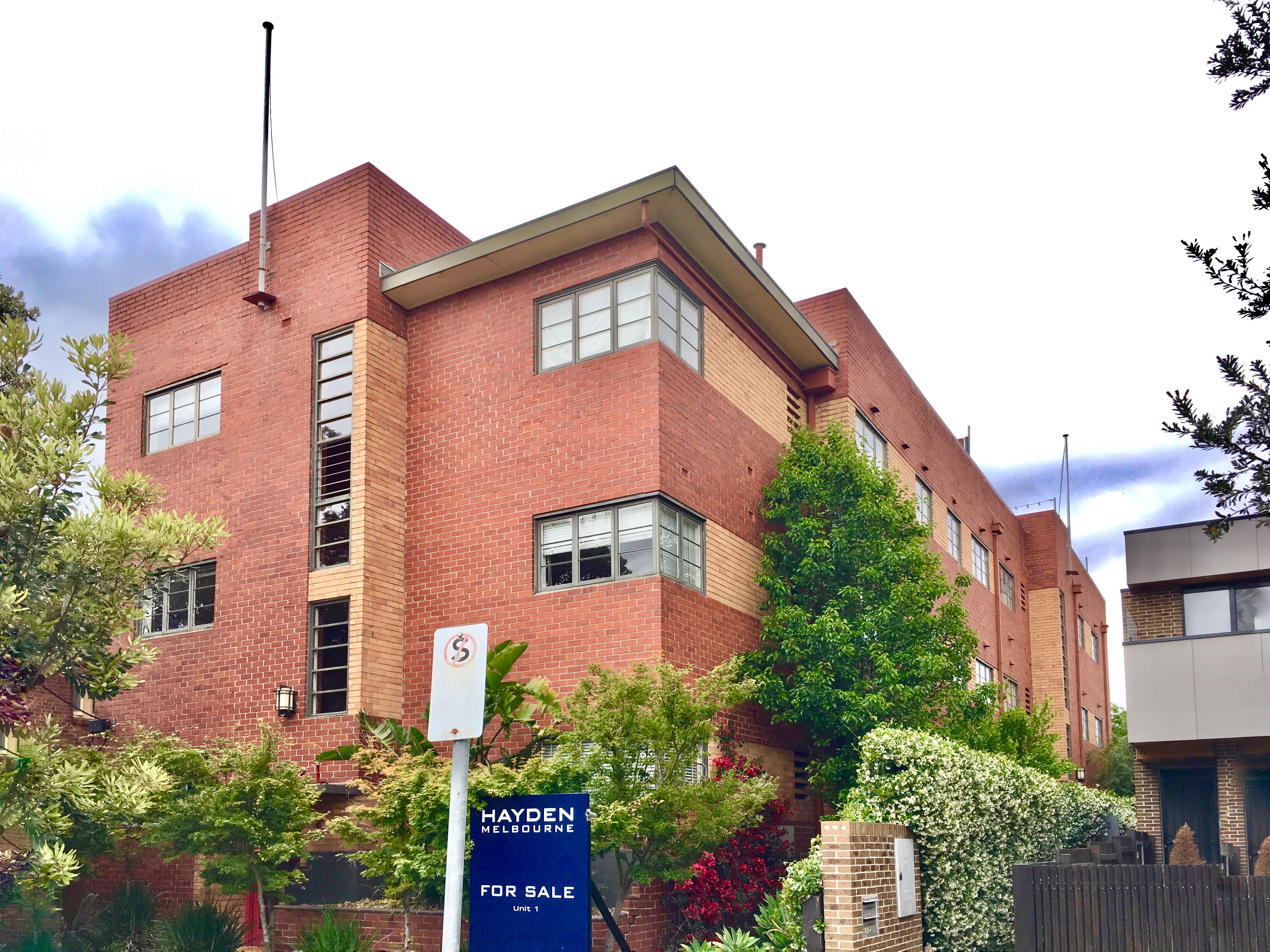
Bellaire Flats, St Kilda, built 1936. Mewton & Grounds, attributed to Geoffrey Harley Mewton. Blocky bands of two-tone brick soften the severe massing of these flats.

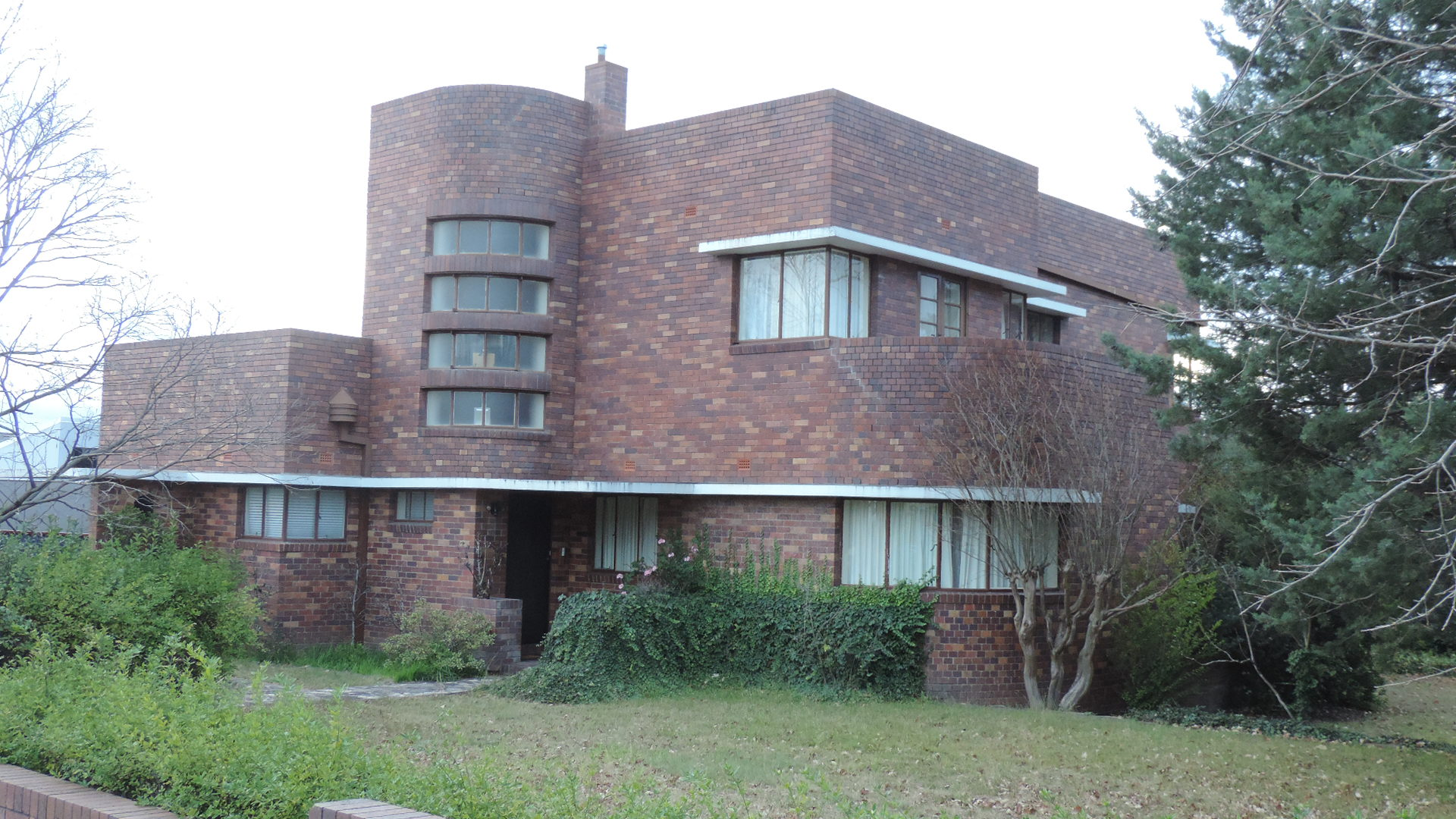
Masel Residence, Stanthorpe. Built from 1937 to 1938; Charles William Thomas Fulton, architect, Kell & Rigby, builders.

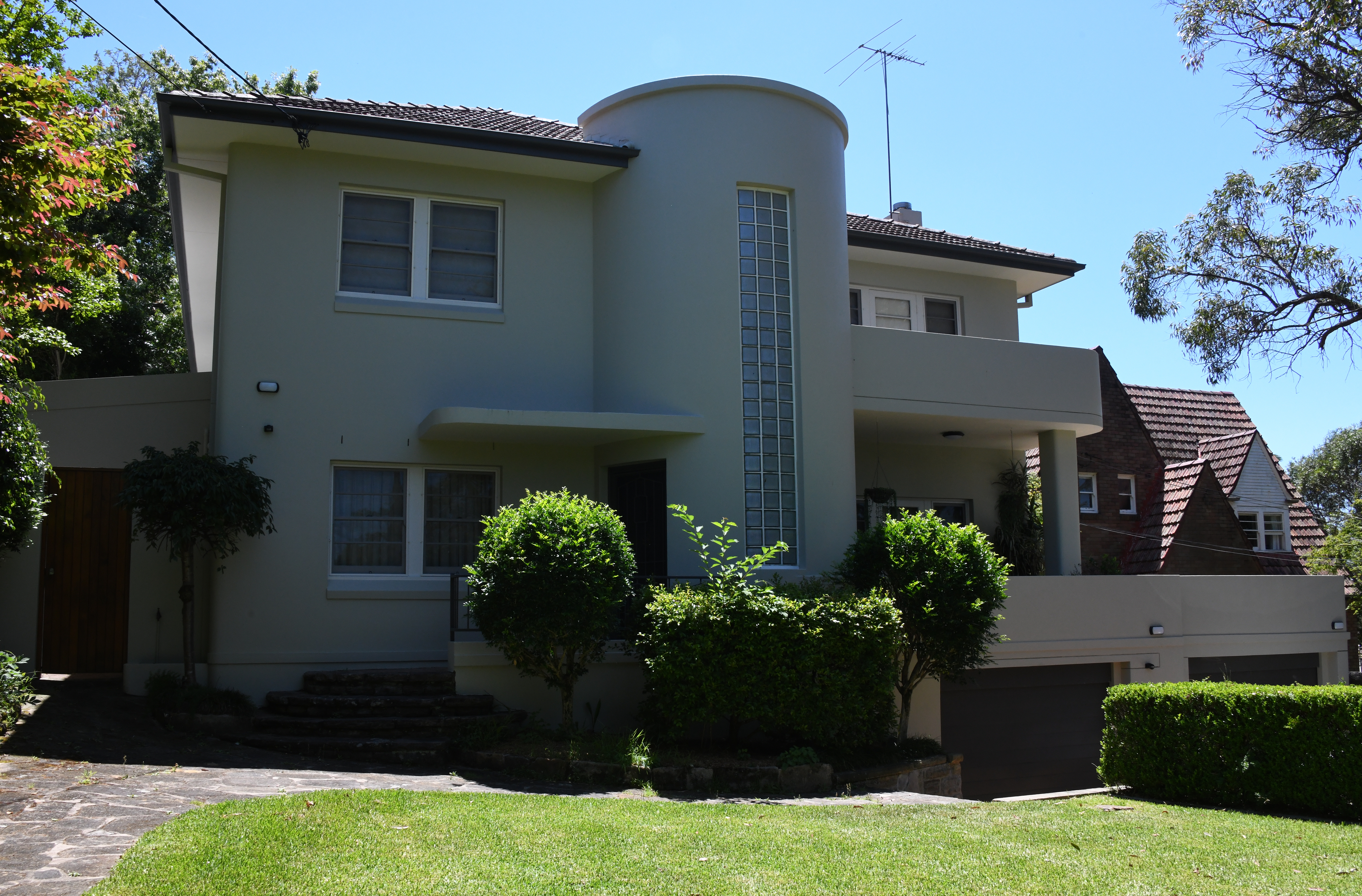
House, Cheltenham; built c. 1938 for the Barmby family.

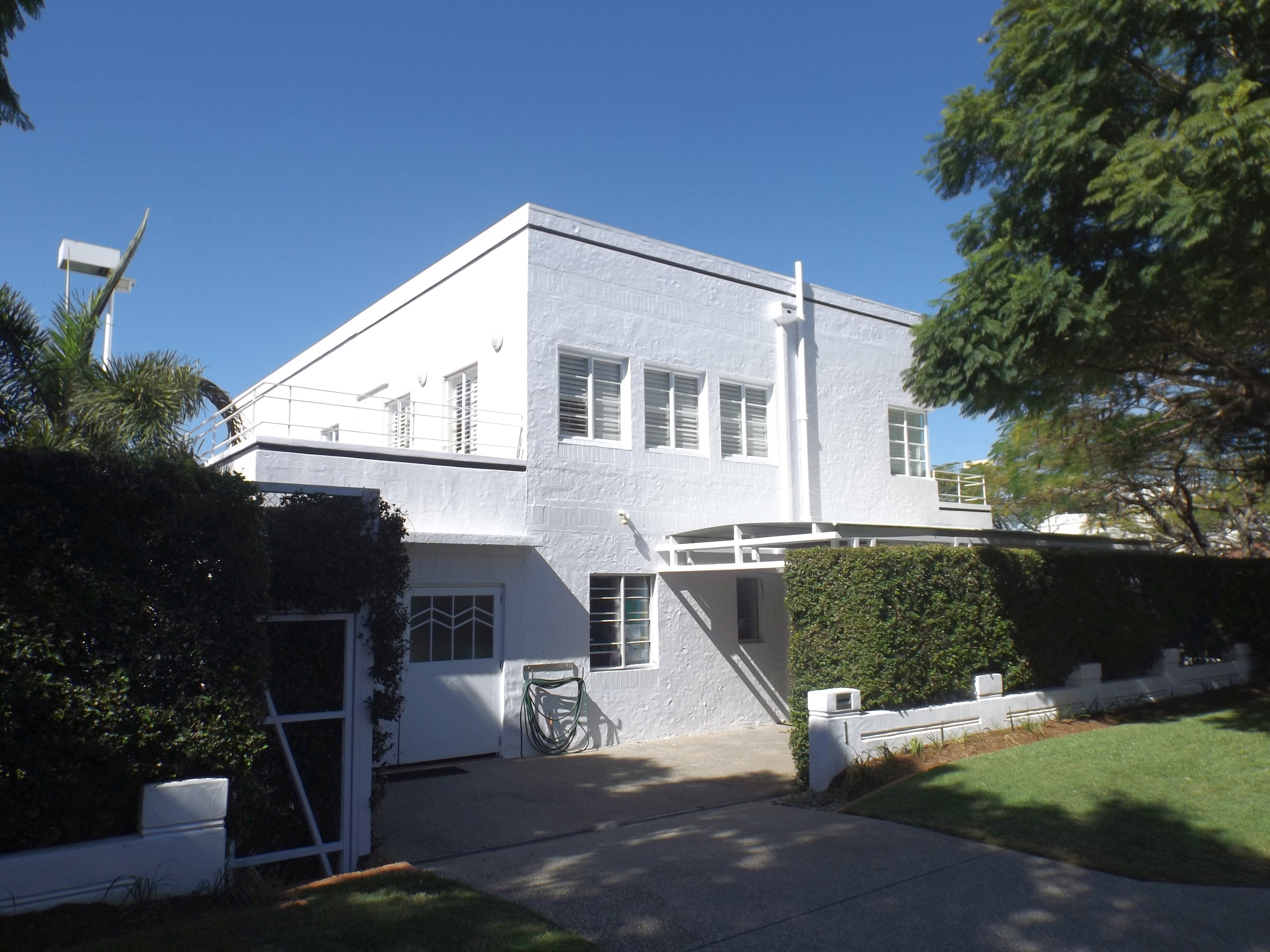
Chateau Nous, Ascot. Built c. 1938. Architect, Douglas Francis Woodcraft Roberts.

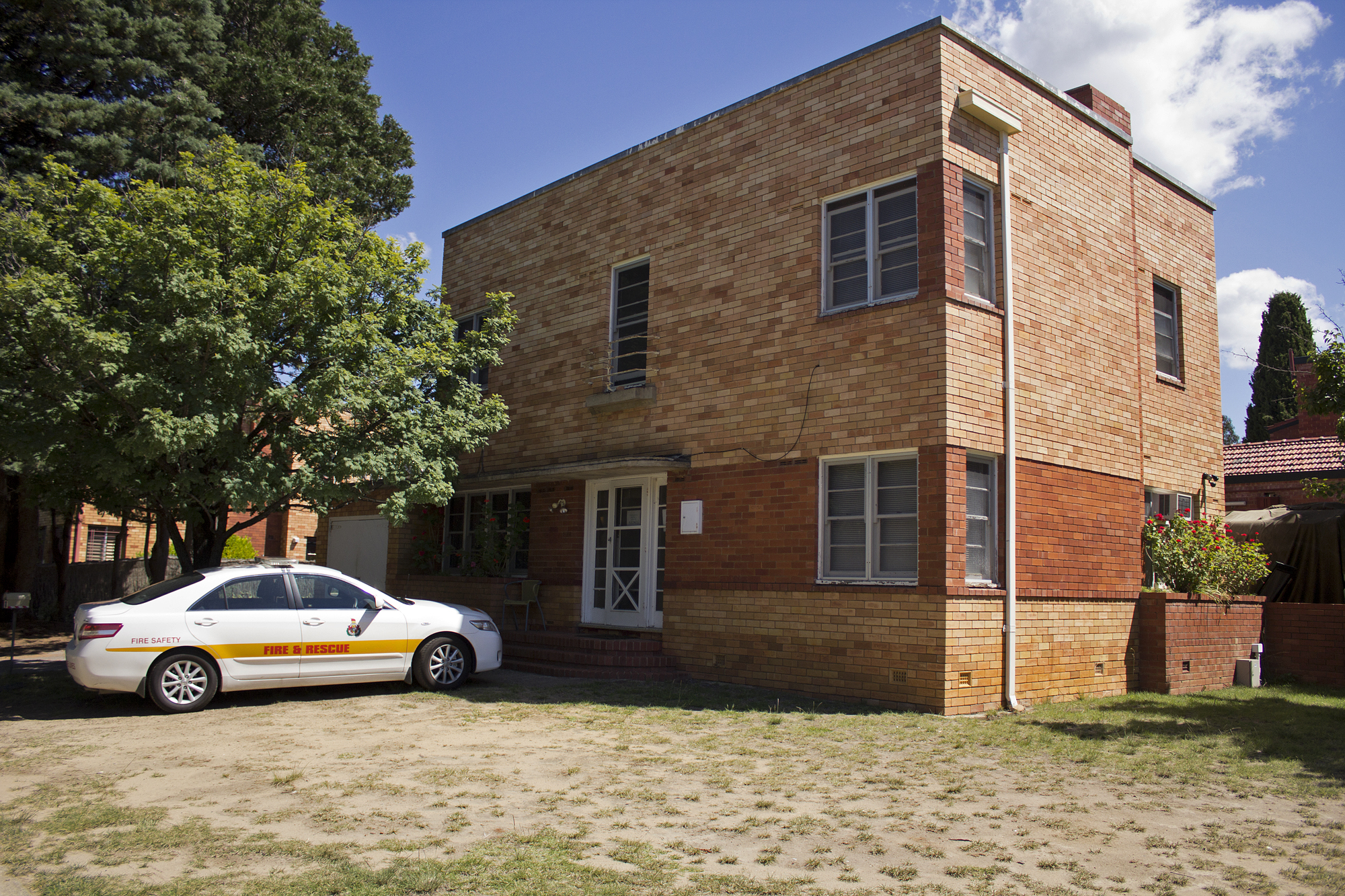
Fire Station Residence, Forest; designed by Government architects E. H. Henderson and Cuthbert Whitley in 1939. Seven residences were attached to the station, each with their own garage

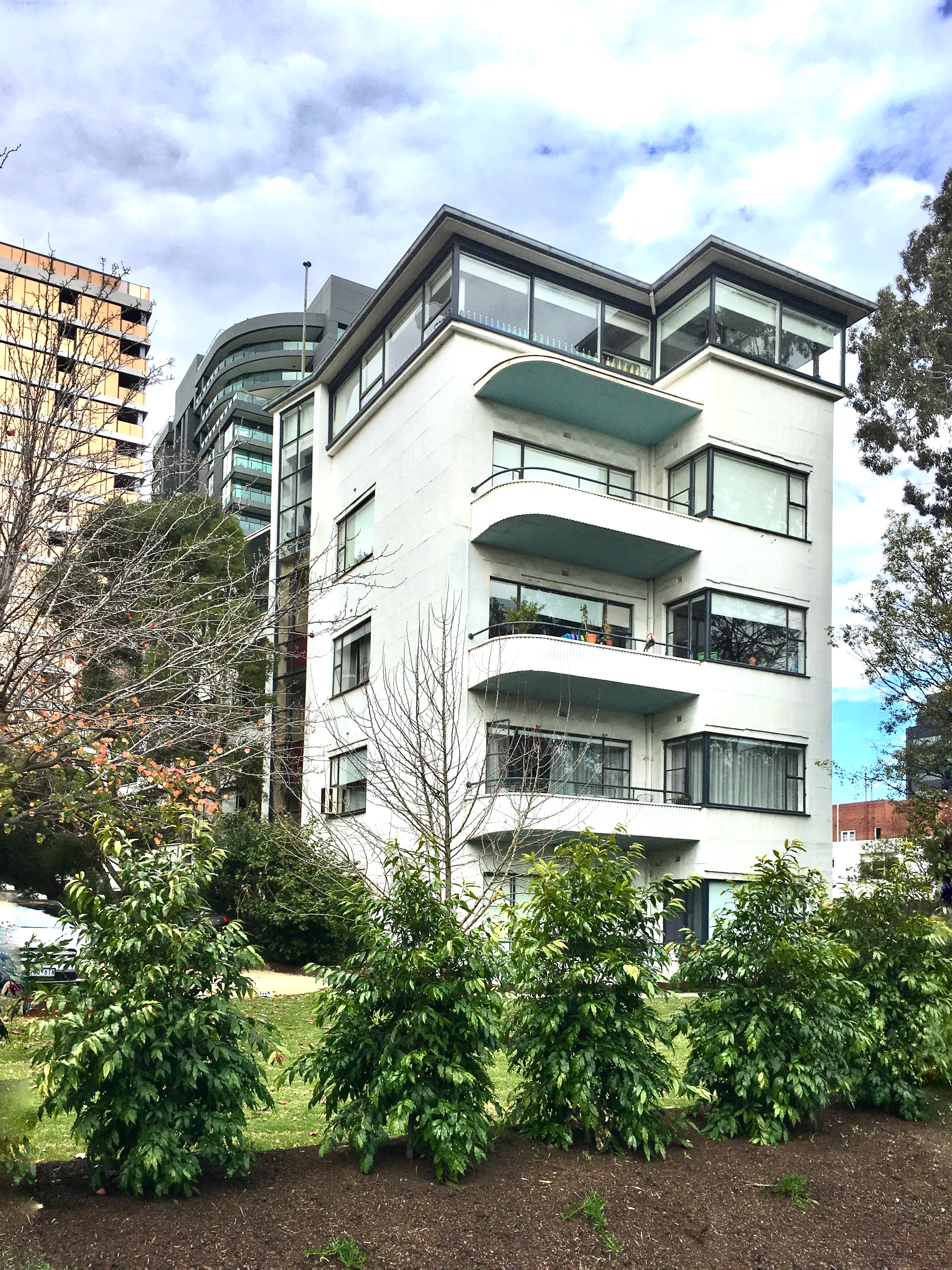
Newburn Flats, Melbourne. Completed in 1941; designed by Frederick Romberg and Mary Turner Shaw in 1939.

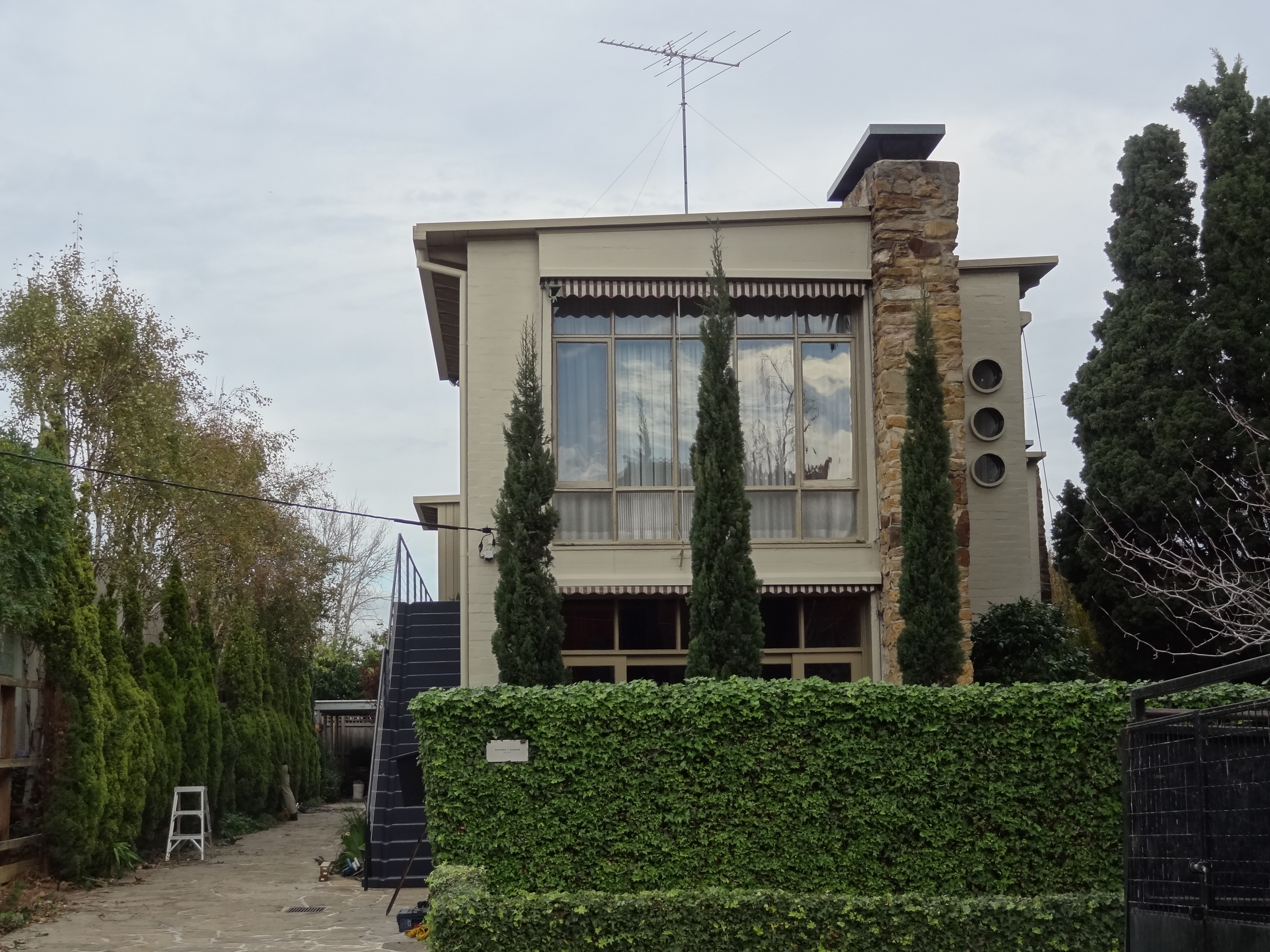
Glenunga Flats, Armadale. Completed in 1941; Frederick Romberg and Mary Turner Shaw, architects. A hybrid of Functionalist components with folksy, 'European Chalet Style’ materials.

==== Inter-war Ashgrovian ====
Originally specific to Queensland, the Ashgrovian style developed during the inter-war period from the hipped bungalow style and was characterised by a frontage with a grand gable roof, often surrounded by secondary smaller gables behind, the smaller gables usually sheltering verandahs and sleep-outs. A staircase almost always dominated the front yard leading to the verandah.

=== Post-War Period c. 1940 – 1960 ===
==== Austere ====
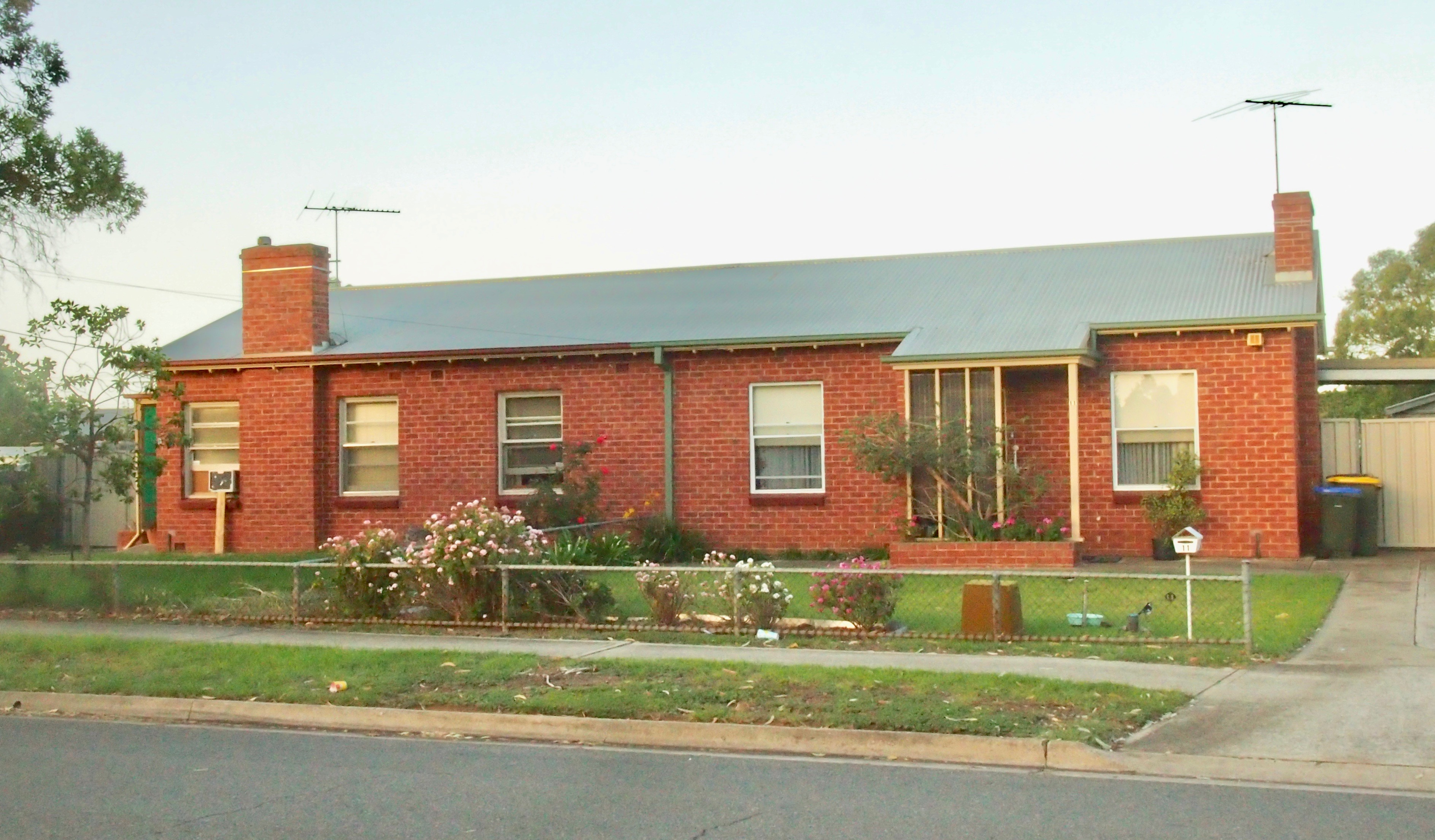
South Australian Housing Trust late 1940s semi-detached cottages, showing little exterior modification of the original design

The Austere style reflected the lack of availability of building materials and labour in the years following World War II.

==== Waterfall (Art Deco) 1940–1950 ====
Fashionable modern houses of the thirties in the Streamline Moderne style were sometimes described as being like ocean liners, with walls, windows and balconies all sweeping around corners. By the 1940s these details were entrenched into suburban designs. The 'Waterfall' or 'Waterfall Front' style came to be known as such from the use of descending curves in chimneys, fence pillars and other vertical elements. Robin Boyd, the Australian architect and writer, noted that three was 'the key to decorative smartness'; three steps usually being used for the waterfall effect and featured parallel lines were often in threes.

Defining features of houses from this period are curved corner windows, including Venetian blinds, some rare examples of which are curved. With a slightly steeper pitched roof than the Early Modern Style, this style was generally of brick veneer cream brick but also could have dark brown glazed feature brickwork incorporated into the external walls, and under windowsills. Chimneys were either stepped or plain, and together with the round windows perhaps gave meaning to the "Waterfall" name.

Ecclesiastical, International, Melbourne Regional, Brisbane Regional and American Colonial were also styles which existed in the period 1940–1960.

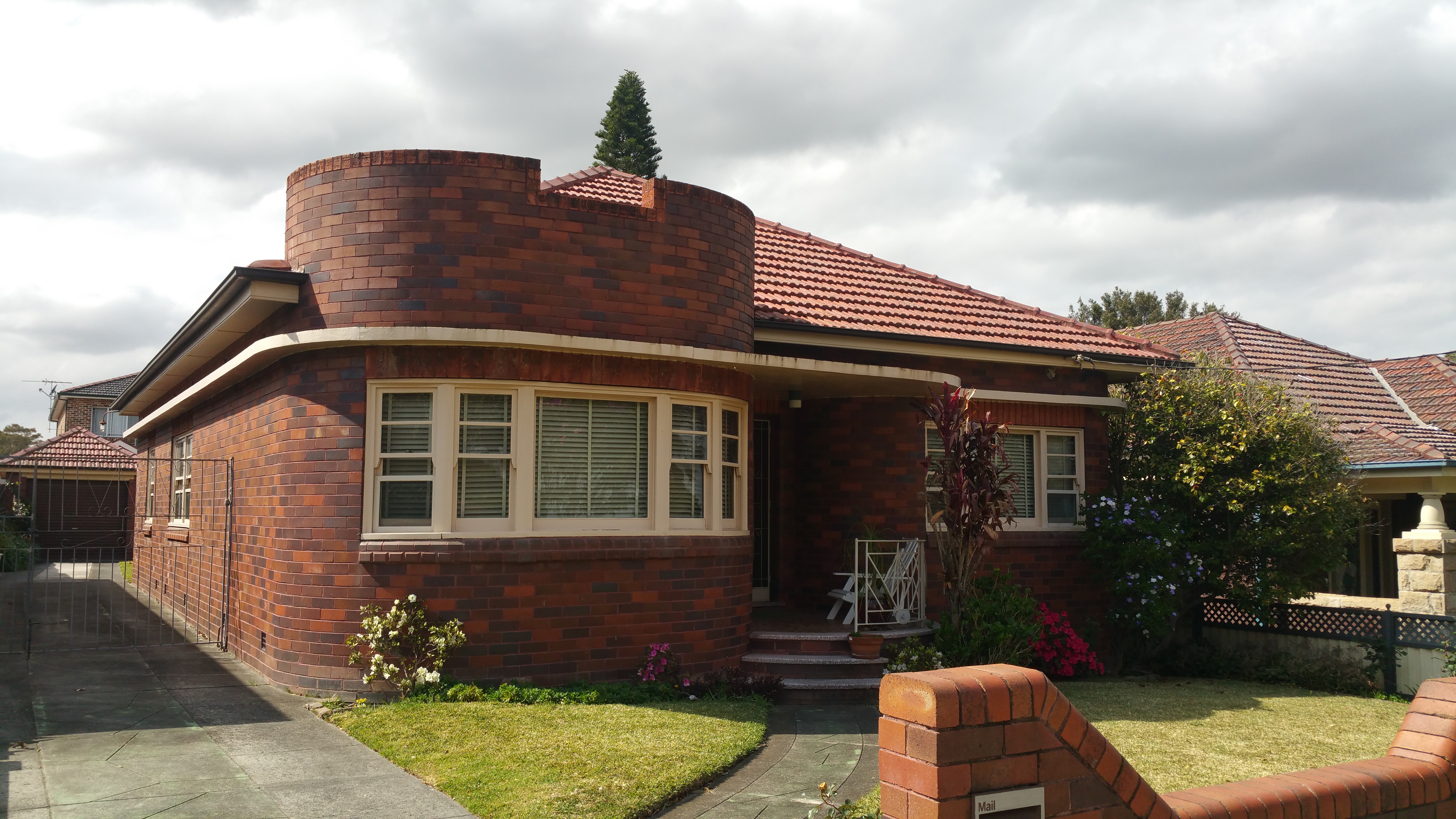
Streamlined Art Deco house in Ashbury, New South Wales

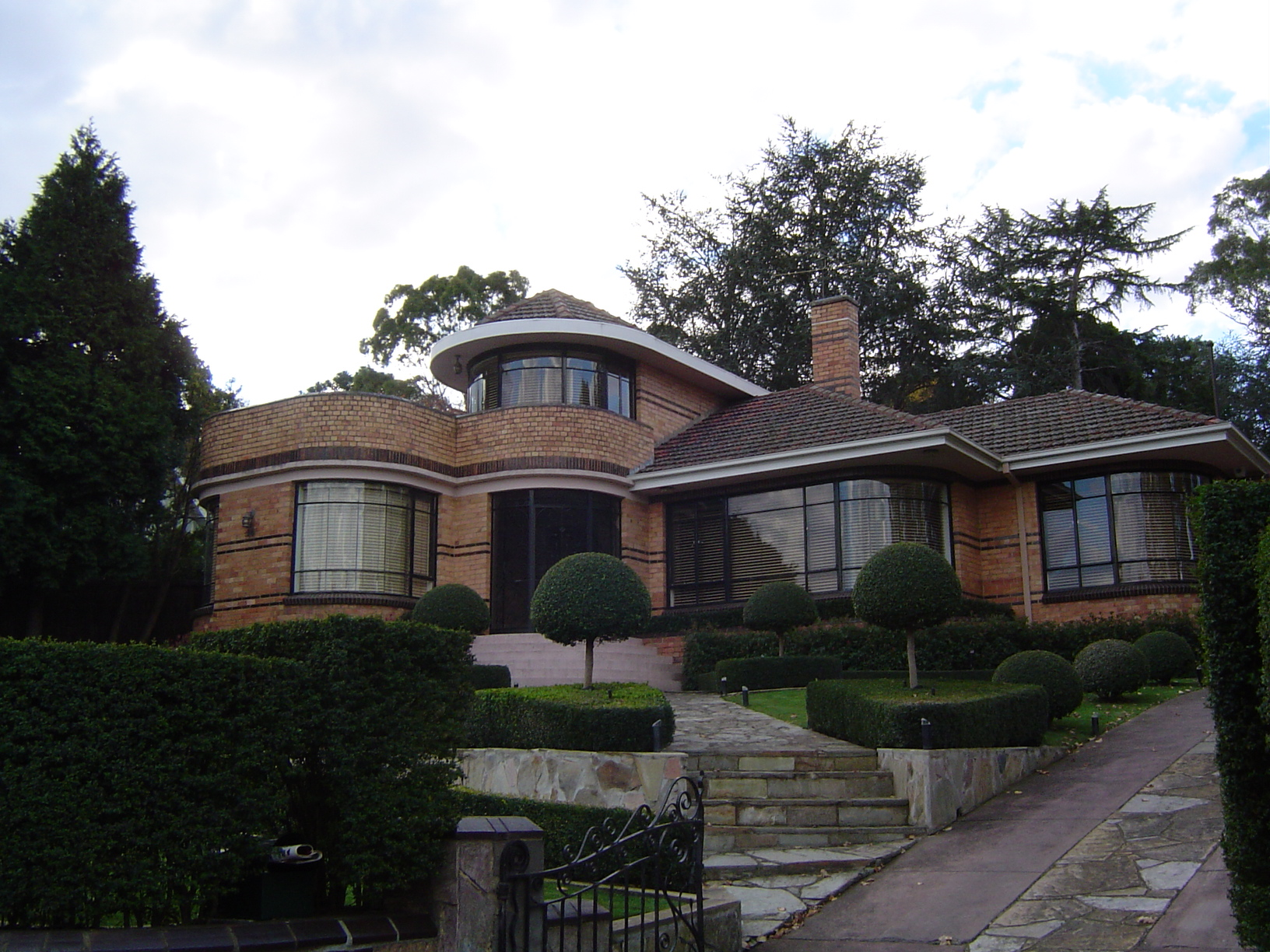
The Waterfall style and Art Deco combined, Heidelberg

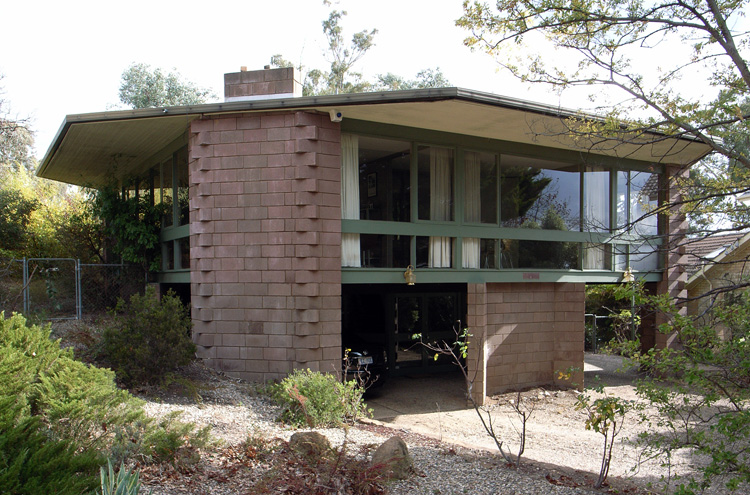
House in Red Hill, designed by Robin Boyd. Typical of the post-war Melbourne regional style: long unbroken roof line, wide eaves, extensive windows.

==== International style ====
After World War II, architects in Australia were influenced by the development of the International Style of architecture. Some regional variations developed. In Melbourne, Robin Boyd and Roy Grounds articulated a Melbourne interpretation of the modern style. Boyd's book Victorian Modern (1947) traced the history of architecture in the state of Victoria and described a style of architecture that he hoped would be a response to local surroundings as well as the popular international style. In particular he nominated the work of Roy Grounds and in some outer suburban bush houses of the 1930s as being the early stages of such a style. Grounds and Boyd later worked in partnership.

The houses were typically narrow, linear, and single storey with a low pitched gable roof. They had exposed rafters and wide eaves. Walls were generally bagged or painted brick and windows were large areas of glass with regularly spaced timber mullions.

The Rose Seidler House, built by Harry Seidler for his parents between 1948 and 1950 in Sydney, incorporated Modernist features of open planning, a minimal colour scheme, and labour saving devices that were new to Australia at the time. The house won the Sir John Sulman Medal in 1951 and is today preserved as a museum as a very influential house.

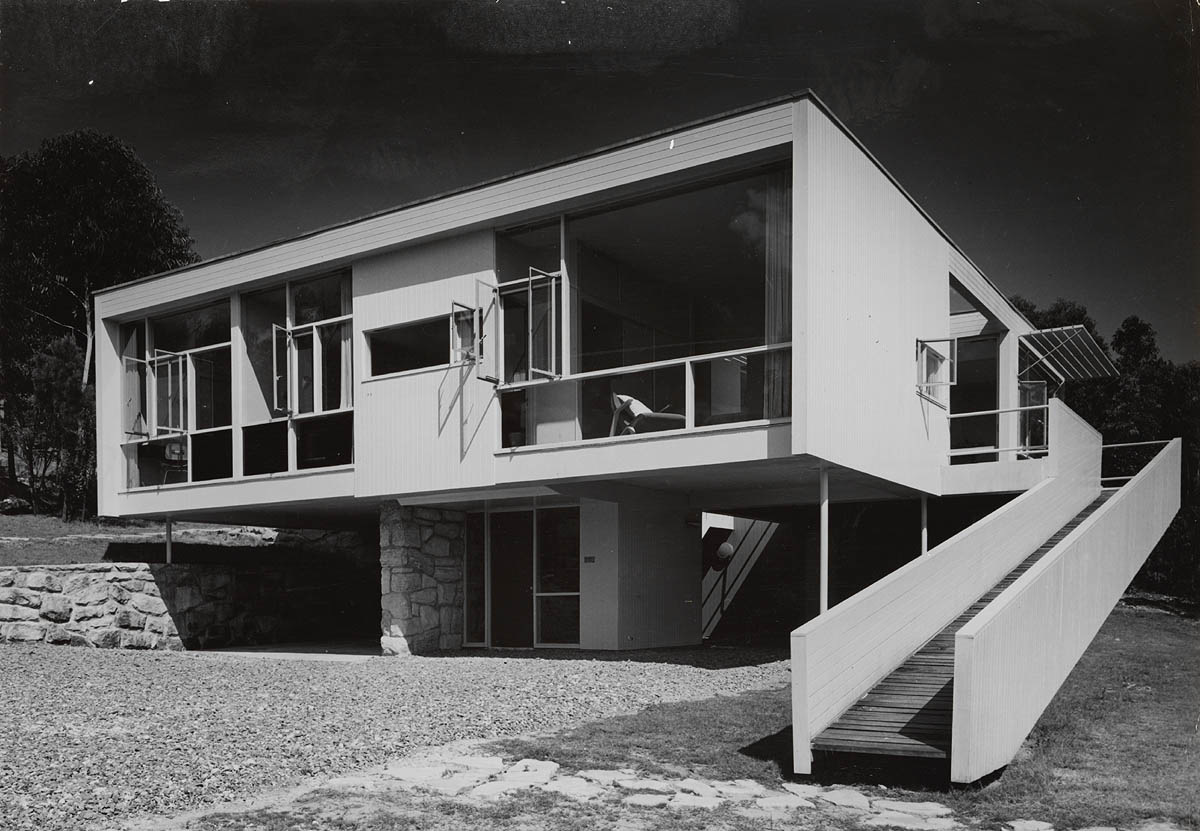
Rose Seidler House in the northern Sydney suburb of Wahroonga. Completed 1950.

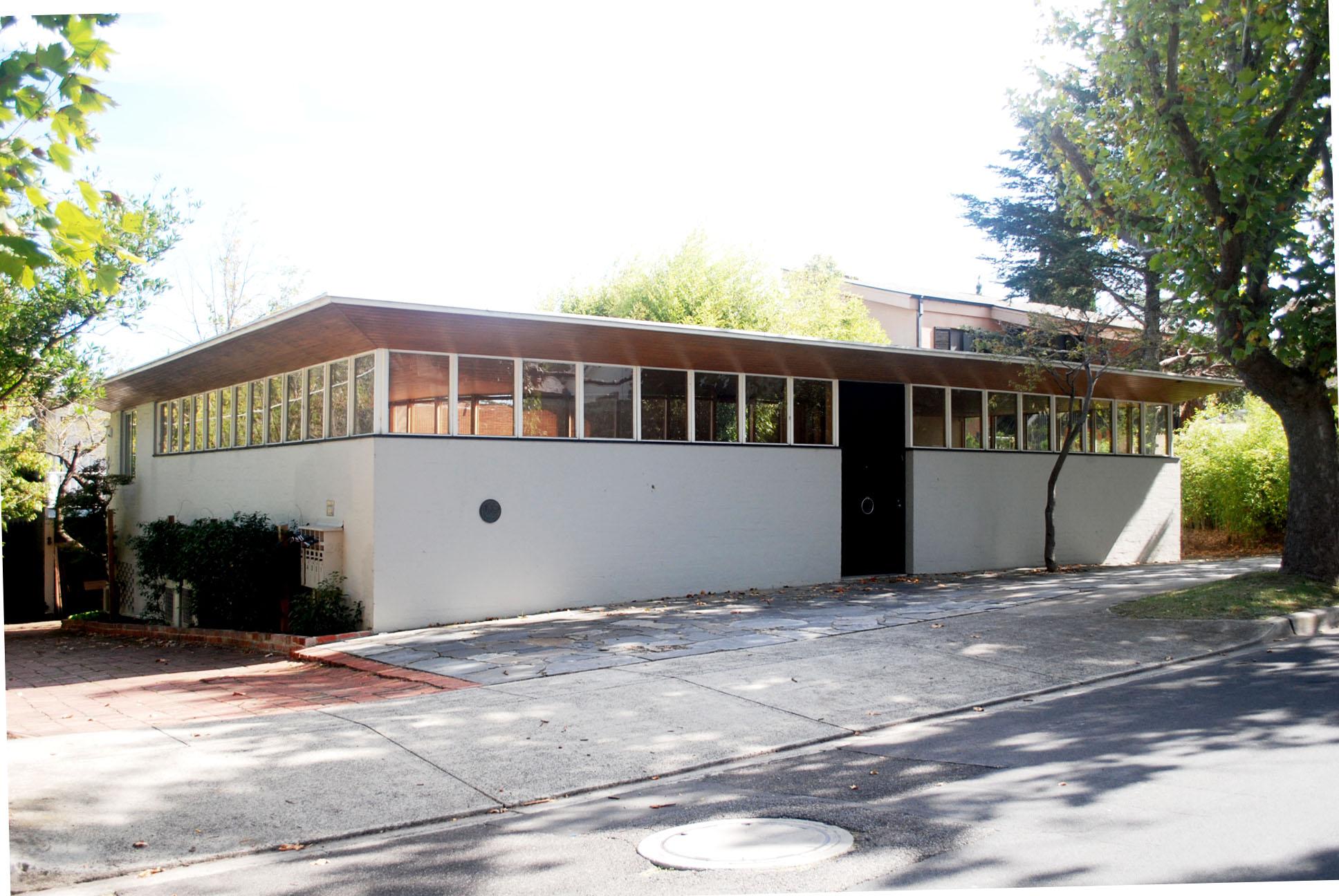
Roy Grounds House, Toorak; built c. 1953.

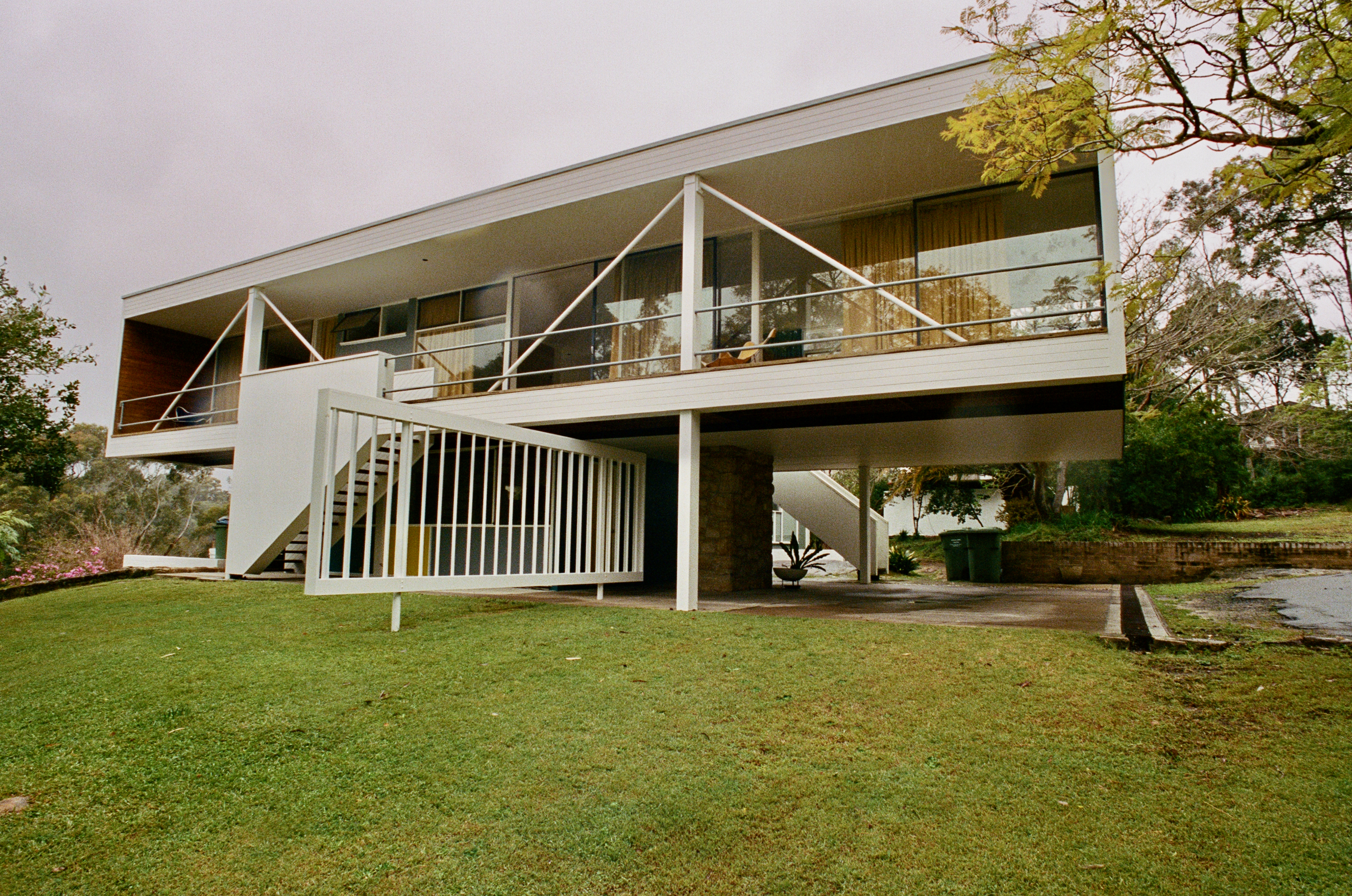
Julian Rose House, Wahroonga. Built c.1954, architect Harry Seidler.

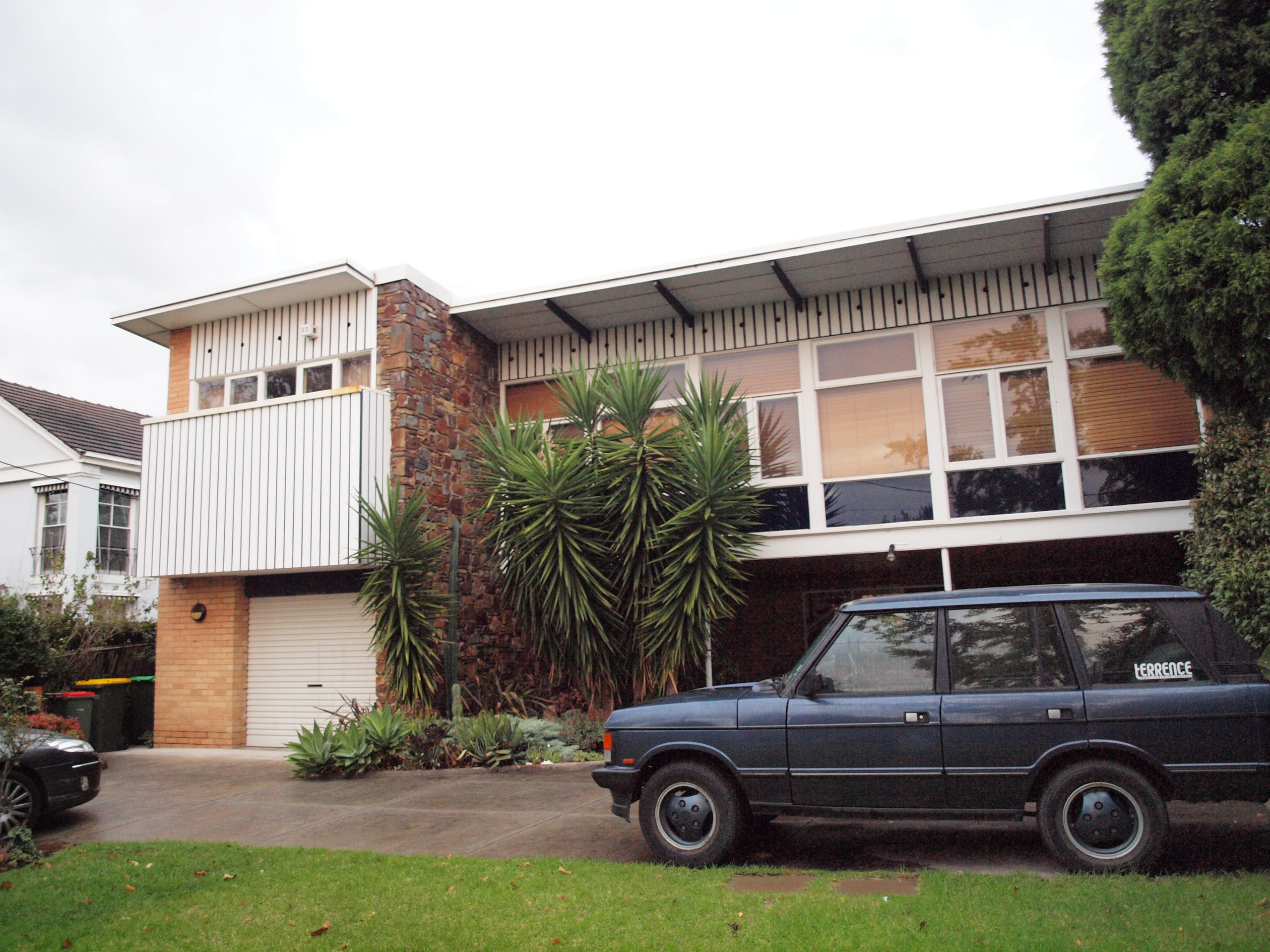
House at Caulfield; constructed 1954–55; architect, Anatol Kagan.

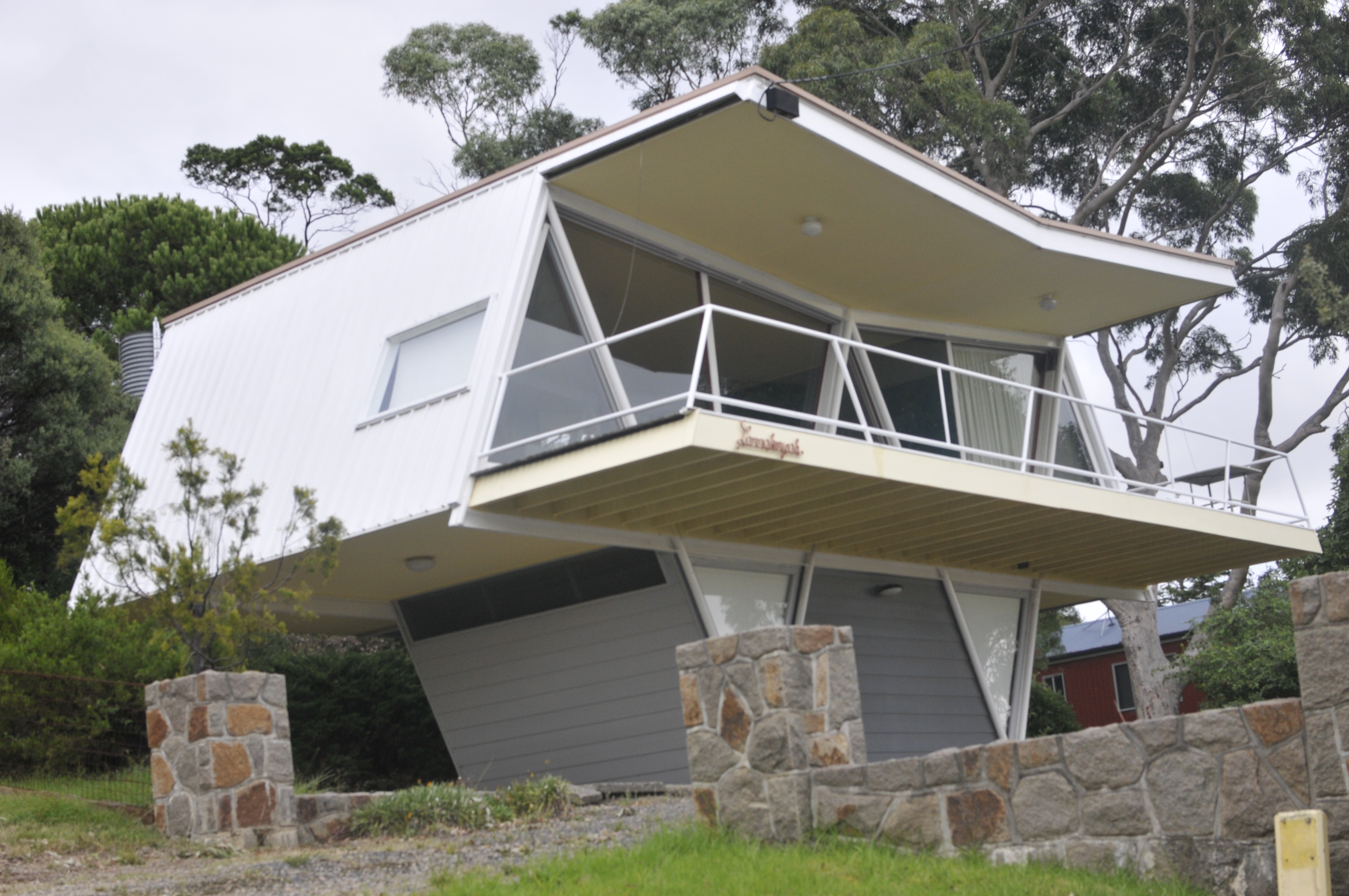
McCraith House, Dromana; constructed in 1955, architects, Chancellor and Patrick.

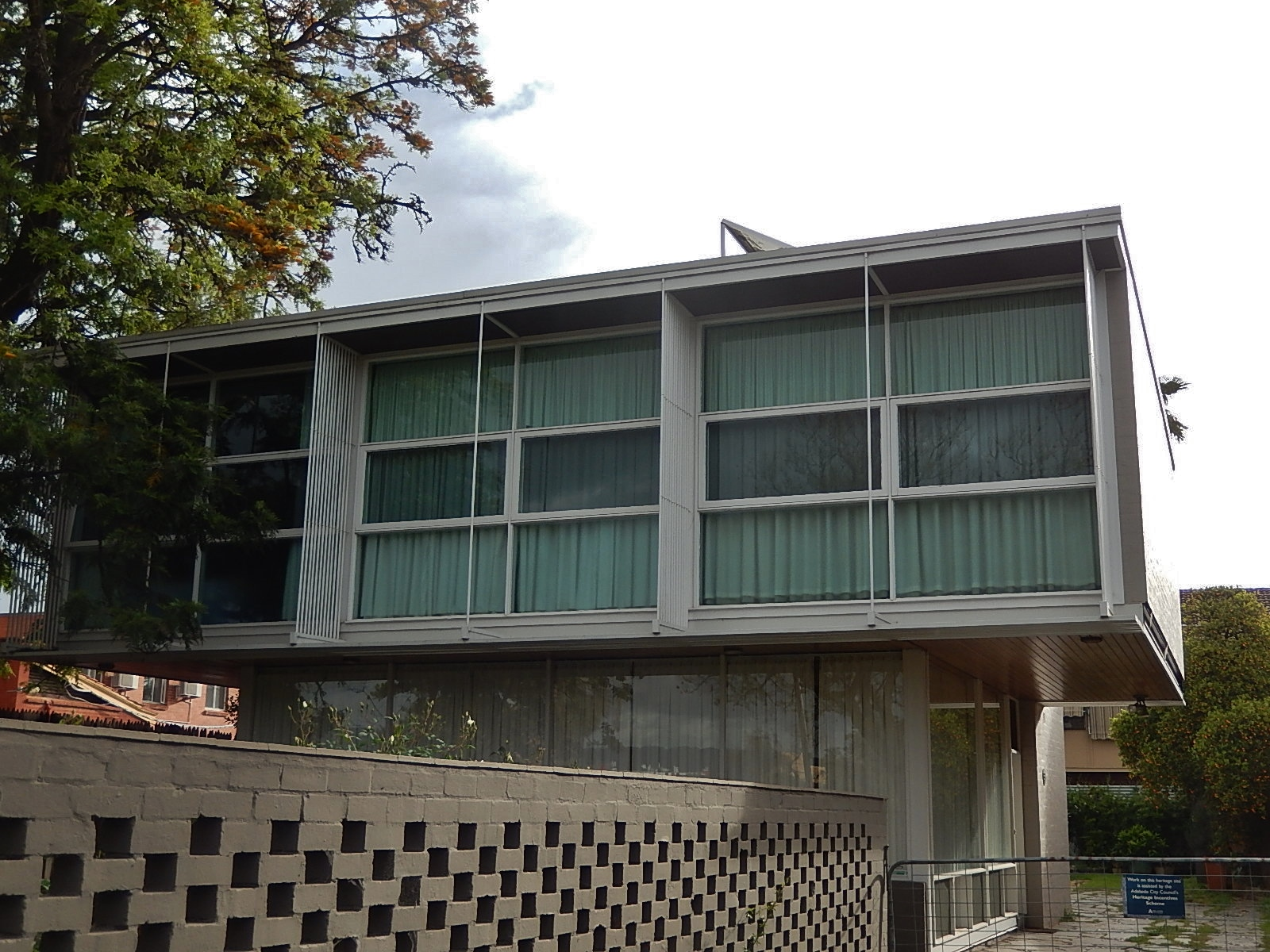
Walkley House, North Adelaide; completed 1956; architect, Robin Boyd.

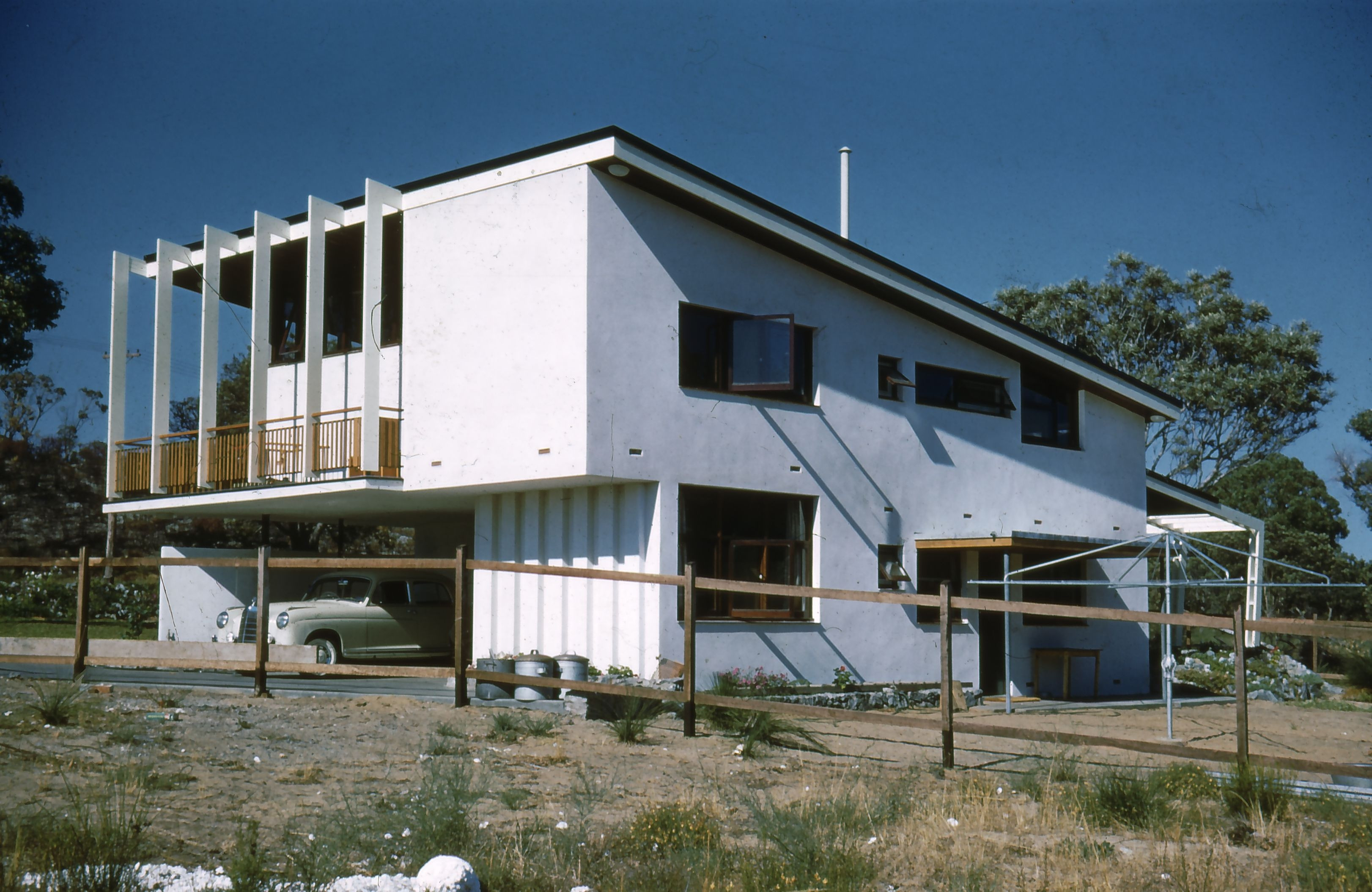
Schmidt-Lademann House, Floreat; completed 1958; architect, Iwan Iwanoff.

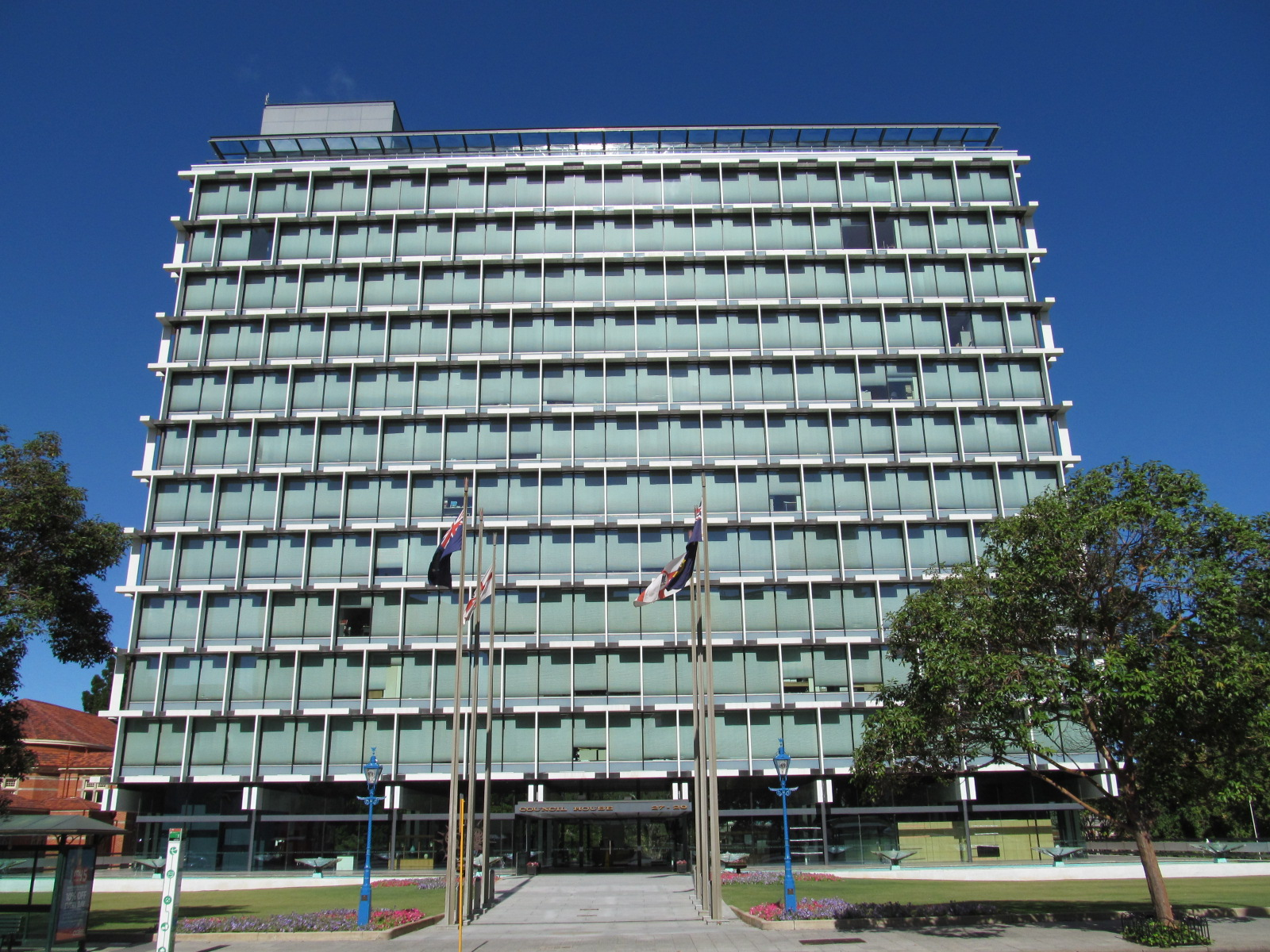
Council House, Perth; from 1959.

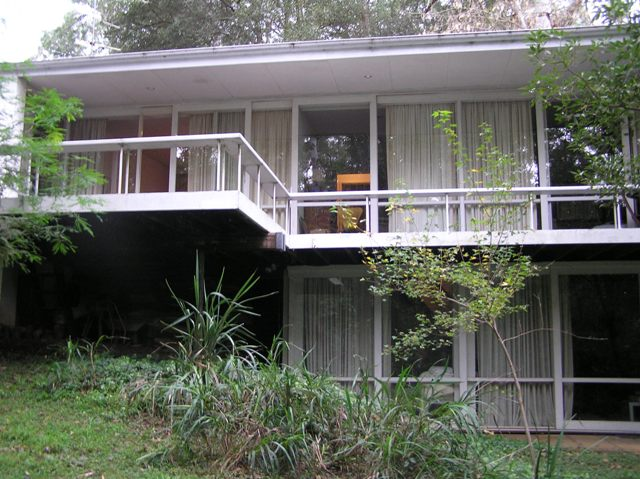
Simpson-Lee House I, Wahroonga; constructed from 1958 to 1962; architect, Arthur Baldwinson; builder, George M. Koch.

==== L-shape 1945–1955 ====
This style represented a change in the overall floor plan, the plan resembling a large "L" Shape. Usually with gabled ends to the L, with terra cotta tiles still being used, as concrete tiles didn't appear until the late 1960s. Timber or steel framed windows were used, and front-facing fences resembled the house, much the same as had been seen since the Early Modern Period.

==== Dutch Colonial ====
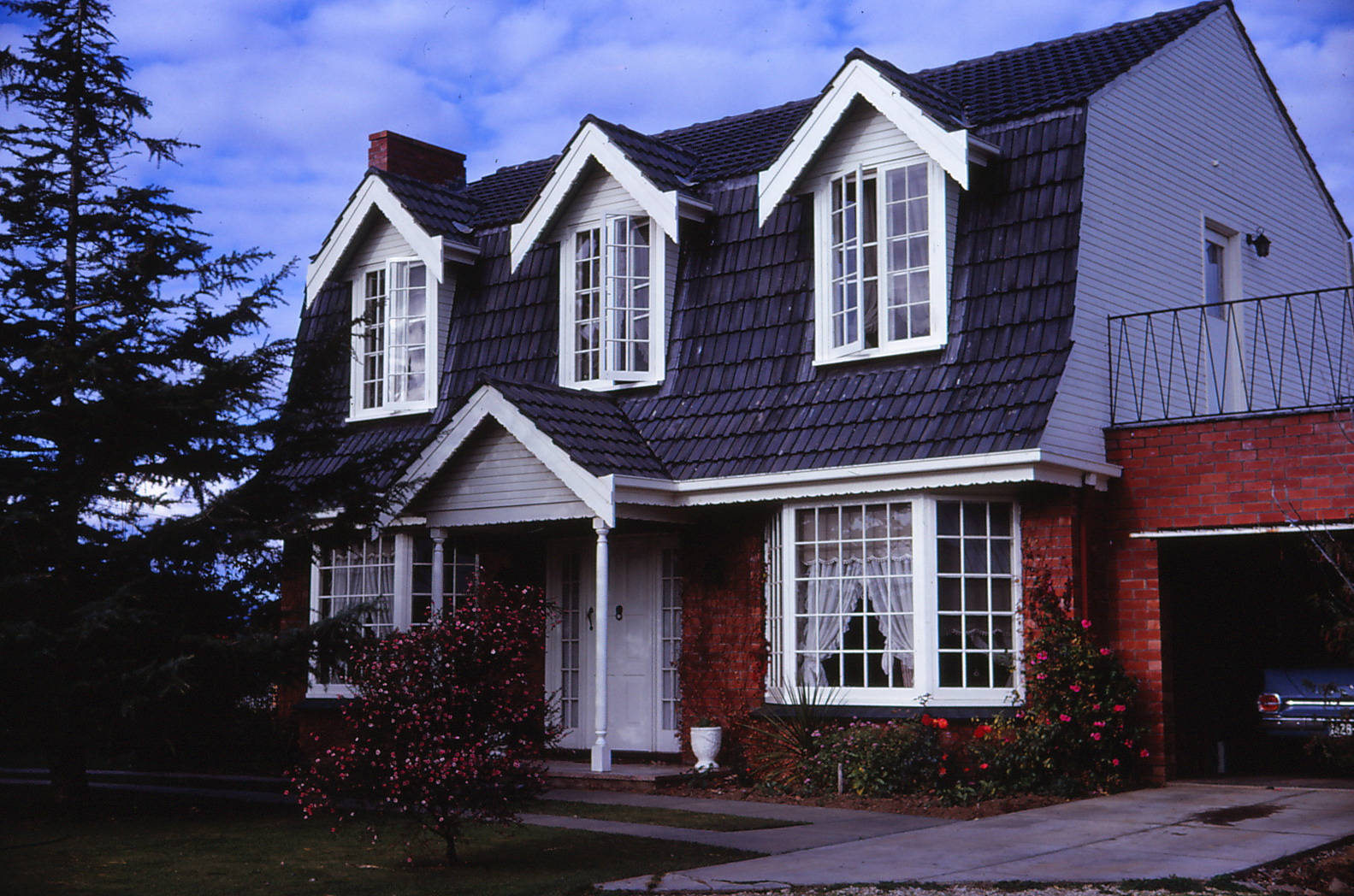
Dutch Colonial home in Adelaide (1950s)

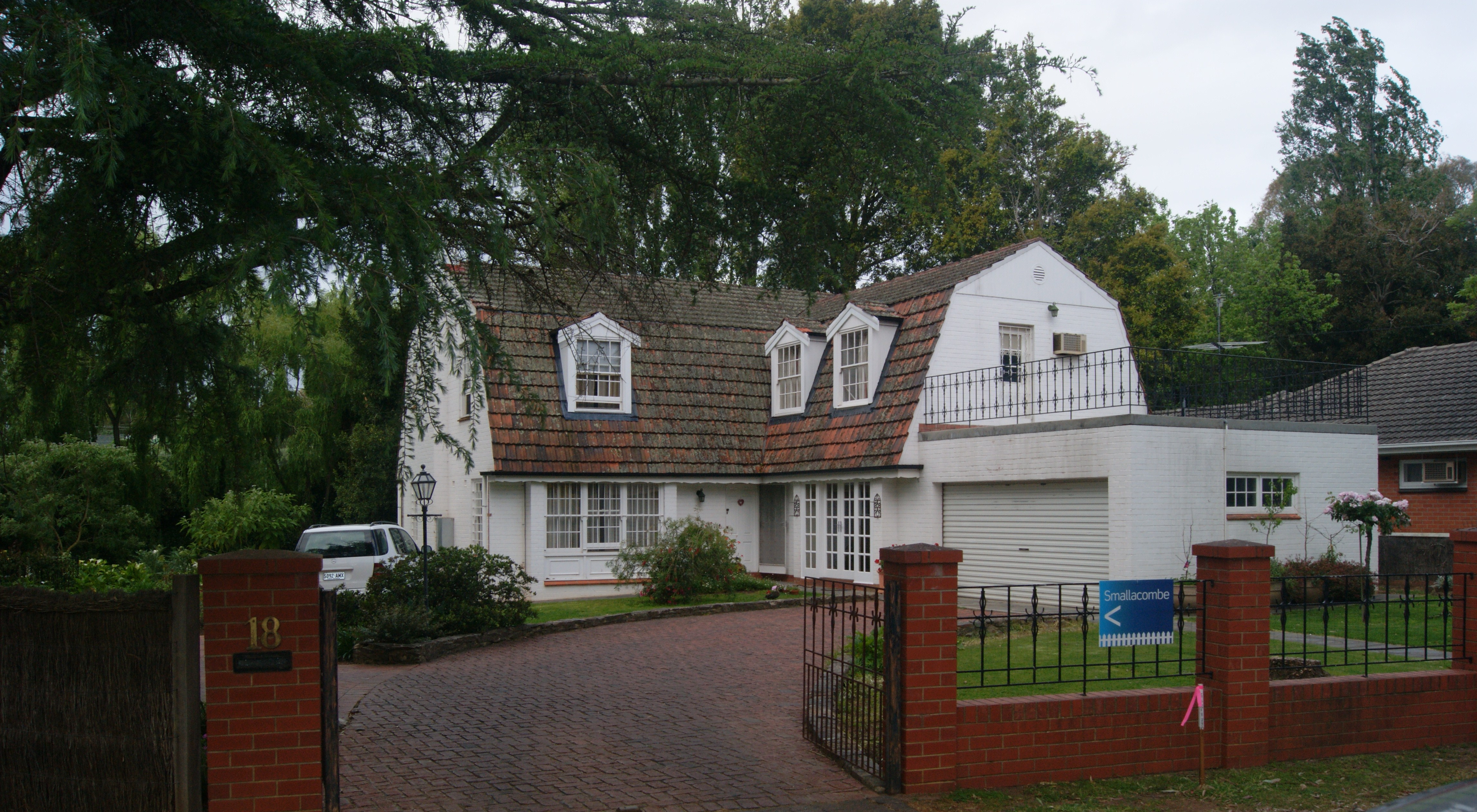
Dutch Colonial house in Mitcham

==== Timber and fibro fisherman's cottage ====
The original fisherman's cottage was built in many coastal towns between the 1930s and 1950s. It was originally a simple timber-framed structure of one or two rooms and a verandah which was clad with asbestos sheeting. The floors were generally raised on piles. The verandah sometimes had handsome wooden balustrade that was sometimes enclosed to make an additional room or sleep-out. Timber detail around windows and gables were often painted- cheery red being one of the most popular traditional colours.

The original cottages, being relatively cheap to purchase, are now popular for renovation. Construction is easy and owner-building is common. The older buildings require insulation in the ceiling and walls. Timber and fiber cement sheeting now replaces the original asbestos and often the interior is completed gutted to create a modern open plan style of living. Timber strap-work can be used and windows frames painted for effect.

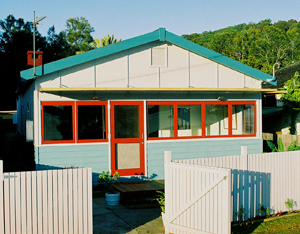
Renovated fisherman's cottage

==== Triple front (cream brick) 1950 – 1960s ====
Distinctly recognisable by their front-facing walls have 3 and sometimes even 4 front-facing walls. This led to the front entrance sometimes brought round to the side within one of the alcoves created by the multiple fronts. Roofs were medium pitched and hipped with concrete tiles being used towards the end of the style in the late 60s. Front fences had a castellated top and feature piers raised above the top of the rest of the brick fence. Decorative iron was used very minimally, in gates to driveways, and balustrades to entrances.

The architectural style was mainly built by Anglo-Celtic Australians to deal with housing shortages that arose after World War II.

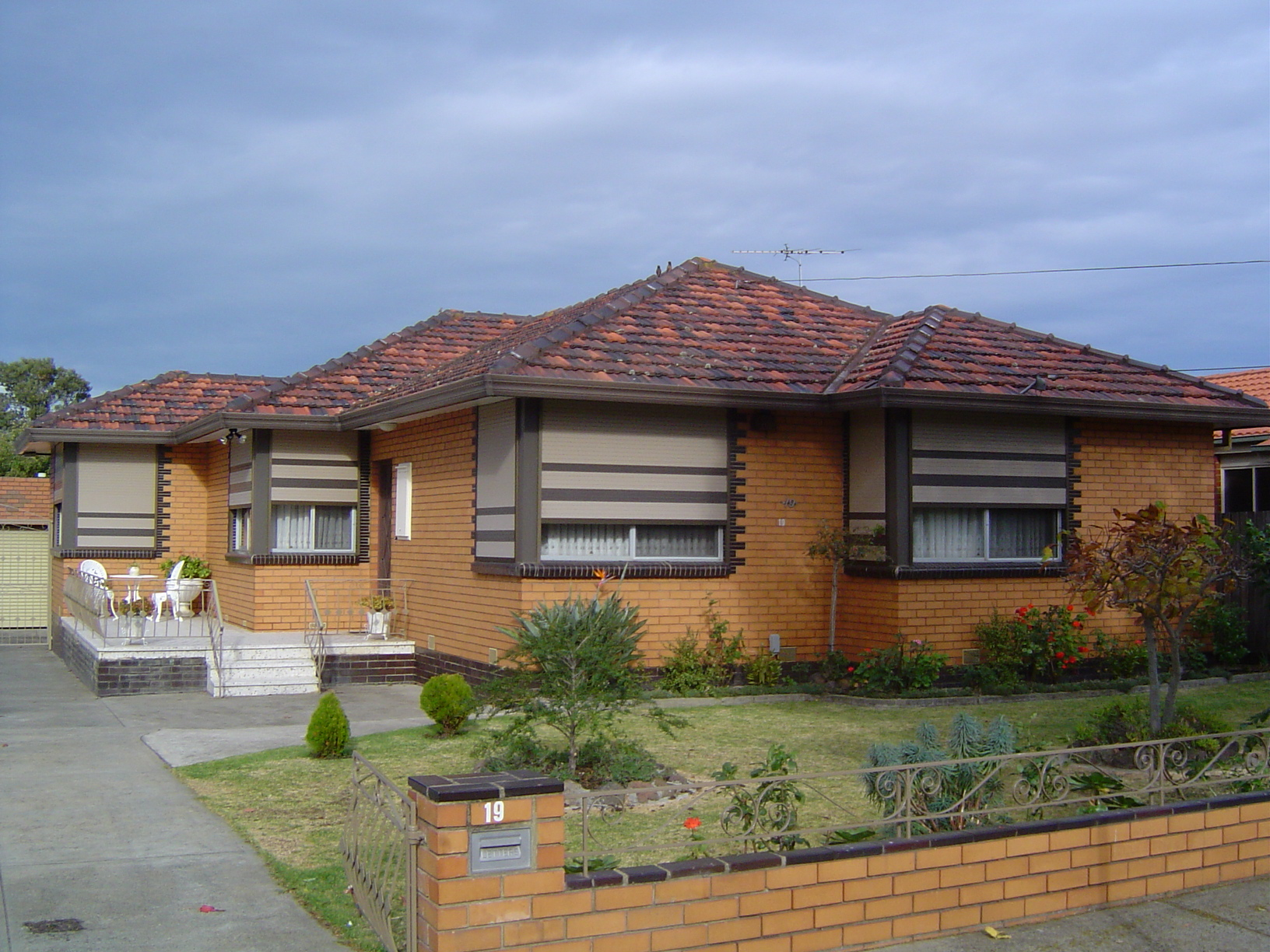
Triple Front (With 4 Fronts), Heidelberg.

=== Late 20th century ===
Styles of the late 20th century have largely been derived from the current world architectural trends, or have been imitative of previous Australian styles. These styles include Stripped Classical, Ecclesiastical, International, Organic, Sydney Regional, Perth Regional, Adelaide Regional, Tropical, Brutalist, Structural, Late Modern, Post Modern, Australian Nostalgic and Immigrants' Nostalgic. In the 1980s and 1990s, most parts of Australia had a building boom which strained building supplies, so many buildings from this era are characterised by cheap and low quality materials.

A good cross section of Australian residential architectural styles from this period, although not necessarily falling into one of the categories above, follows. Almost all of the houses shown in this section were built after 1960 and photographed just north of Sydney on the Central Coast of NSW.

Each of these styles has a different emphasis to practicality (physical needs, layout, and views), land and environmental considerations (structural requirements for foundations, design for weather protection) and aesthetic considerations (planar, volumetric, and sculptural form, emotional and spiritual qualities.) All of these requirements and qualities should be considered when designing a house.

==== Migrant House ====
In the 1950s and 1960s, large influxes of migrants from eastern and southern Europe arrived to Australia and settled in cities, mainly in Melbourne and Sydney. The need to house the non-English speaking migrants became a high priority and the migrant house developed as an architectural type in neighbourhoods of the inner-city, later spreading to outer suburbs. Over time the suburban dwellings built by migrants became known as the migrant house. The architectural style of housing has also been referred to as "Late-Twentieth-century Immigrants’ Nostalgic". Certain decoration and construction features identify the migrant house. They are a (dark) brick-veneer, concrete balustrades atop a staircase going toward a terrace, arches, expanses of concreted areas that replace the front yard lawn, trees such as olive or citrus (often lemon), decorative fences made from iron, and stone lions.

==== Regional gabled cottage ====
This popular style has emerged from the triple fronted brick veneer. While the house footprint and floor plan may be quite similar, the gabled cottage has a very different feel. In this style the distinctive gabled roof is a dominant design element, and a practical means of providing shade and entertaining space. Constructions can be entirely of brick (often painted), entirely timber, or a combination of brick on the lower part of the house and timber on the upper. Some houses of brick construction have featured verandahs and porticos. Roofs are usually galvanized iron and windows metal framed.

While it is well suited to sloping blocks, this style can also be built on a slab. The use of timber cladding greatly reduces weight and construction costs.

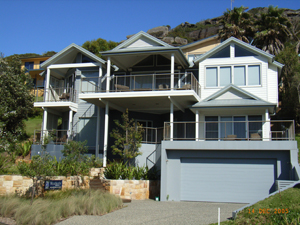
Timber regional gabled style architecture

==== Ranch–style ====
The ranch-style became popular in the nineties. With conception in the United States, it originated in suburban Adelaide and subsequently became popular in regional and coastal New South Wales. The floor plan is simple and footprint (of at least the street-facing section) is often rectangular. Walls are usually brick, or brick and timber, and windows are often colonial style floor-to-ceiling. Roofs usually tiled with extended eaves. The garage was often integrated into the house. Some ranch style houses were boomerang shaped, others were L-shaped for corner allotments.

Ranch style houses can be readily combined with the Murcutt/Drew style (timber and galvanized iron). These smaller ranch style houses often have balconies the width of the house.

==== Murcutt/Drew steel and corrugated iron house ====
A number of styles have emerged from the influence of architects Phillip Drew and Glenn Murcutt. The geometric play of angles is often a signature, likewise the (sometimes exposed) steel framing and corrugated iron cladding which is available in a variety of colours. Fiber cement and timber cladding is often used with the iron to create a sympathetic blend of textures.

Being of lightweight construction, the steel and corrugated iron approach is relatively cheap and suitable for both flat and steeply inclined land. Interior cladding is most often gyprock but can be timber or even plywood. Butterfly roofs can also be employed quite successfully in this design. This style of house is suited for steel framed pole houses on steep slopes.

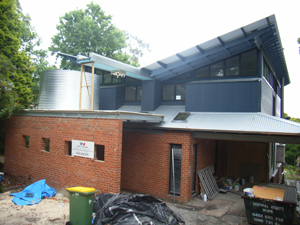
Murcutt Drew style architecture

==== Federation revival ====
During the early-1990s, many of the design elements that characterised the Federation architecture of old were popularised in mainstream architecture. This Federation revival form is also known as "mock Federation" or "faux Federation". The style was widespread within the realm of residential housing (especially in new development suburbs) and for apartment buildings; however, smaller shopping centres and other public buildings also made use of the revival style that retained widespread popularity until the early 2000s. Suburbs of Sydney that developed in the 1990s—such as Cherrybrook, Wetherill Park, Green Valley, Cecil Hills, Edensor Park, Castle Hill, and Menai—are notable in the sense that large tracts of these developments contain almost exclusively Federation revival homes.

The construction of Federation revival architecture varied little from that of other basic styles, with the Federation elements merely forming the facade and decorating elements of the building. For example, the typical brick and roof tile construction, hexagonal turrets, ornate gable work, finials, prominent verandah, steep pitched roofs, and faceted bay windows served to parallel the traditional Federation architecture.

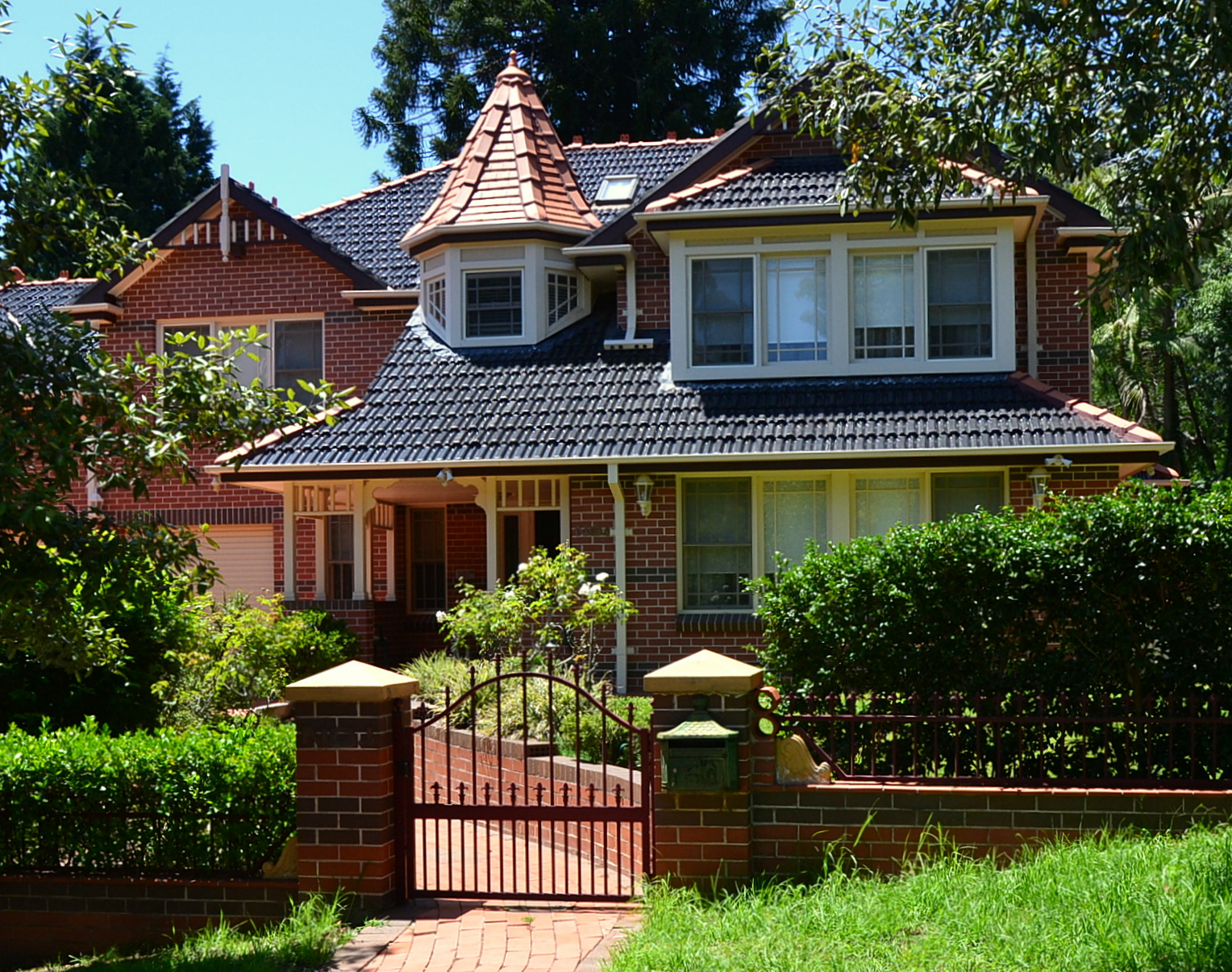
Federation revival home in Wahroonga

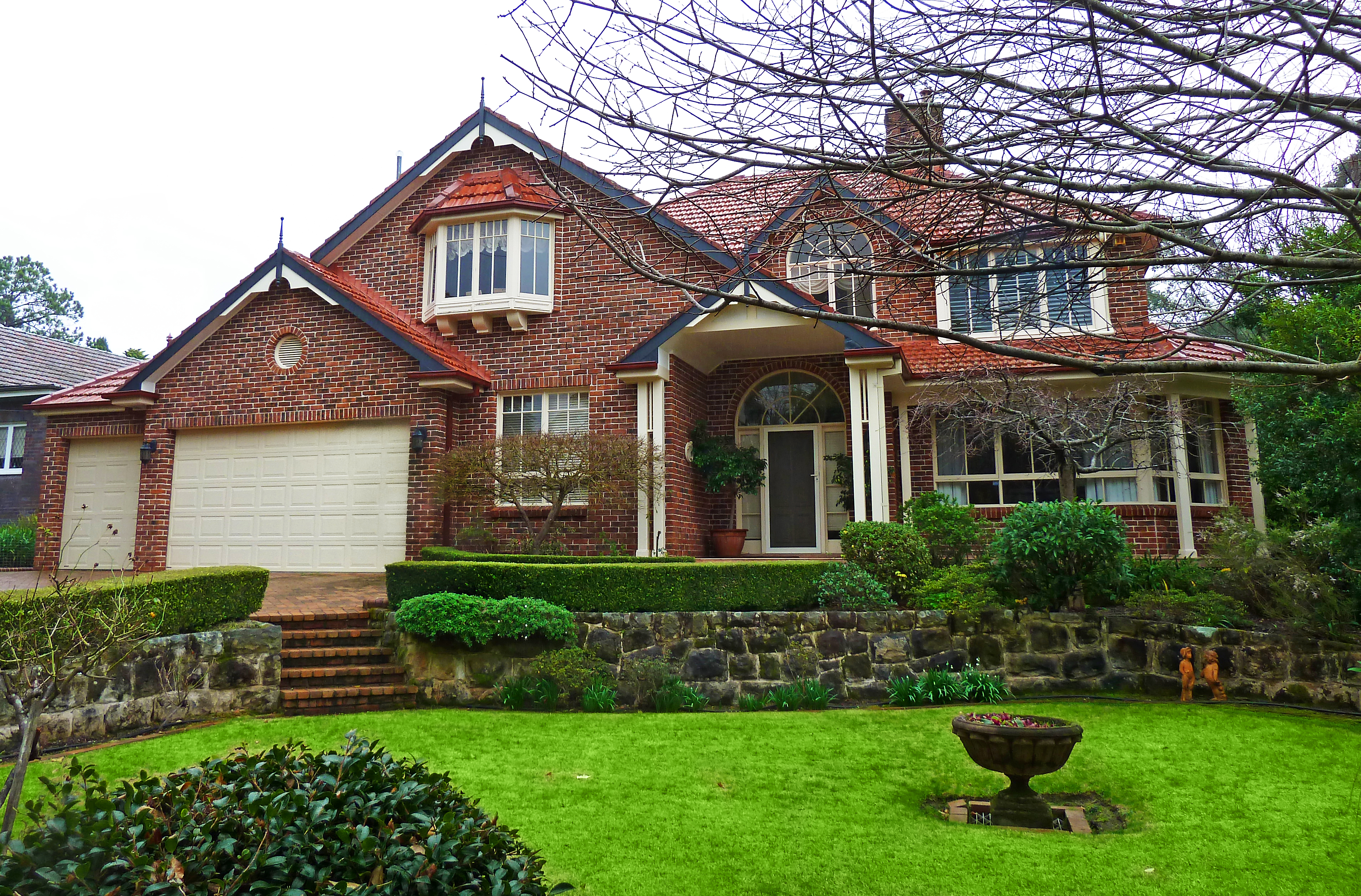
Federation revival home in Roseville (1994)

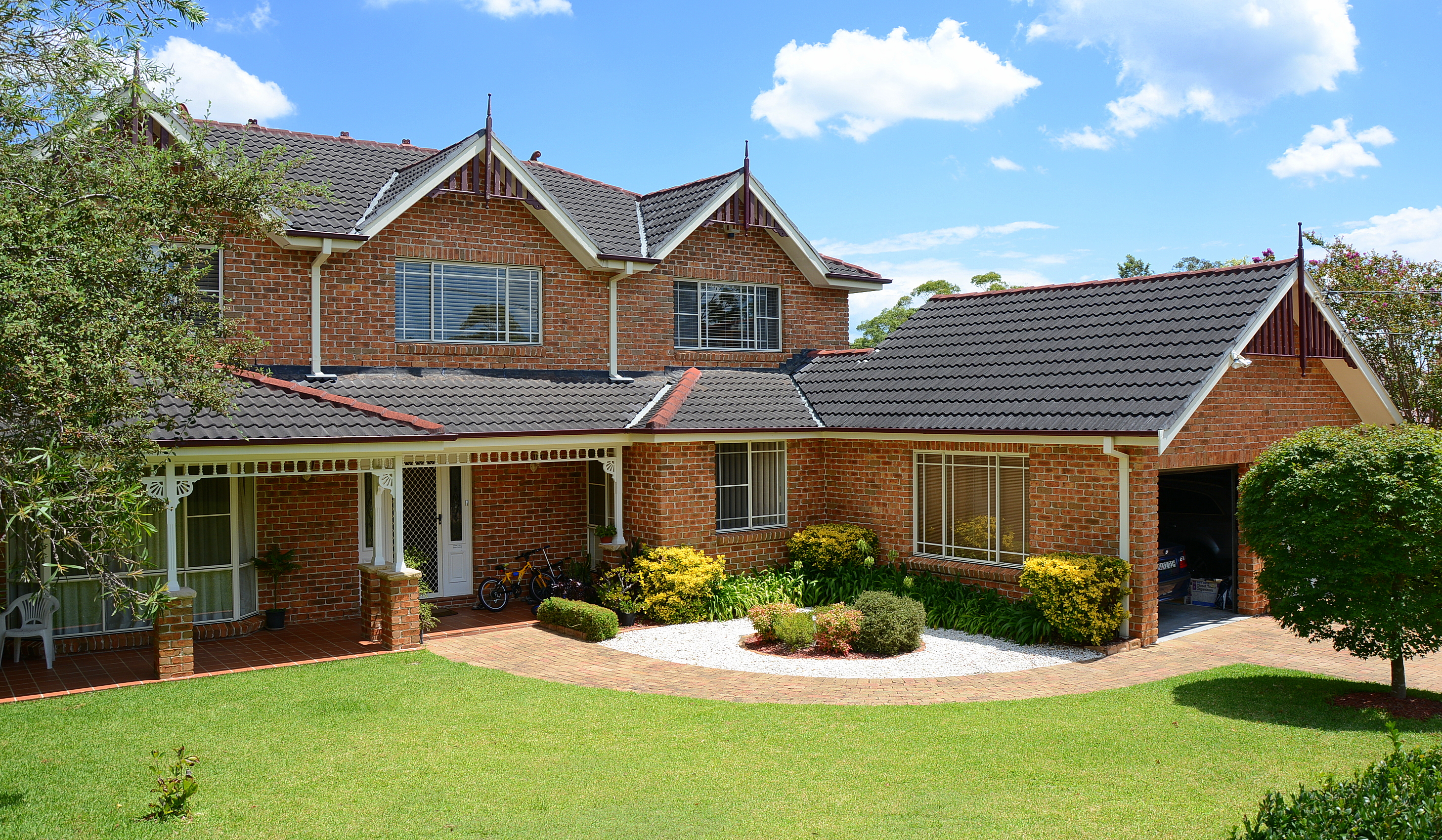
Federation Revival house in Hornsby

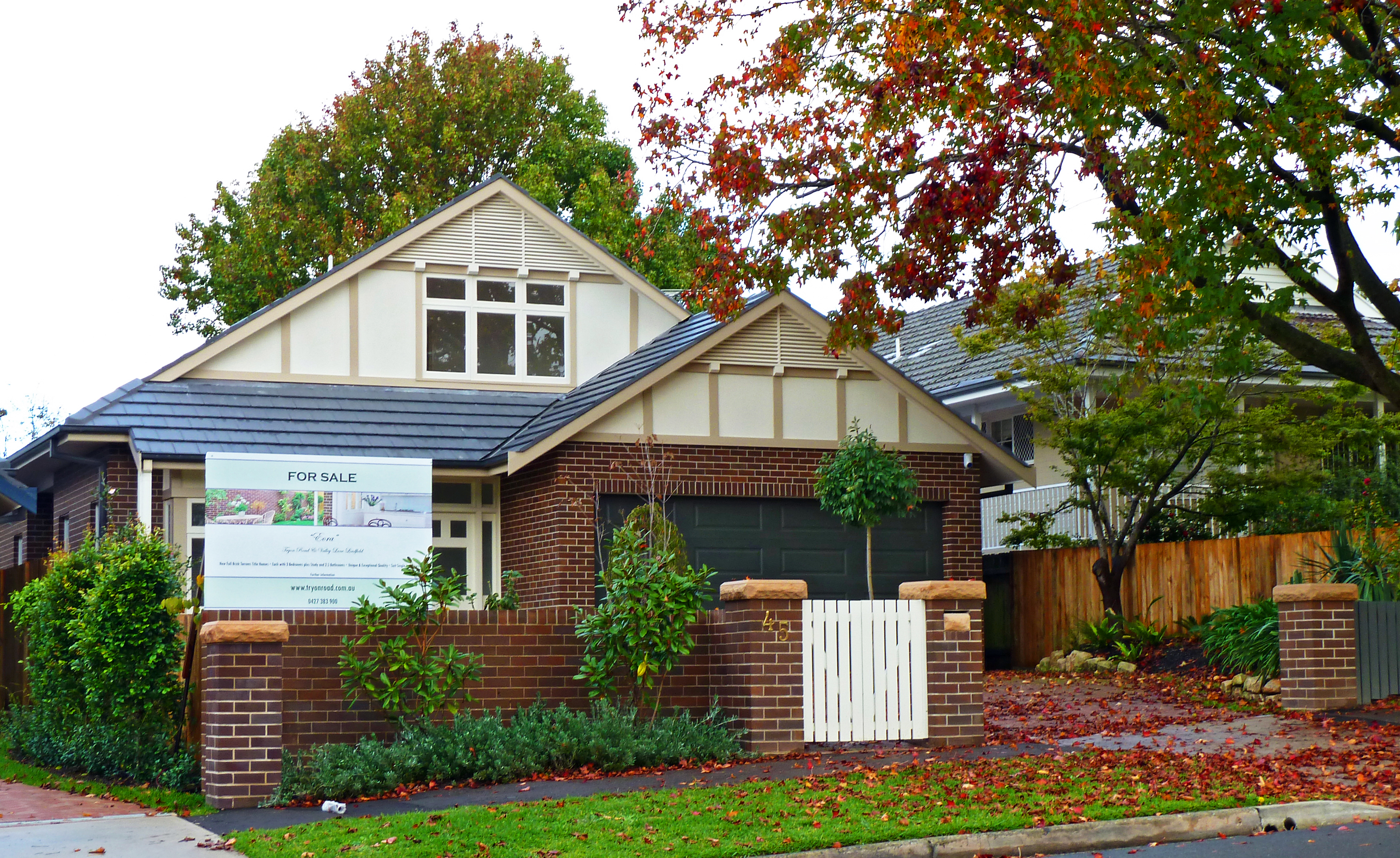
Lindfield

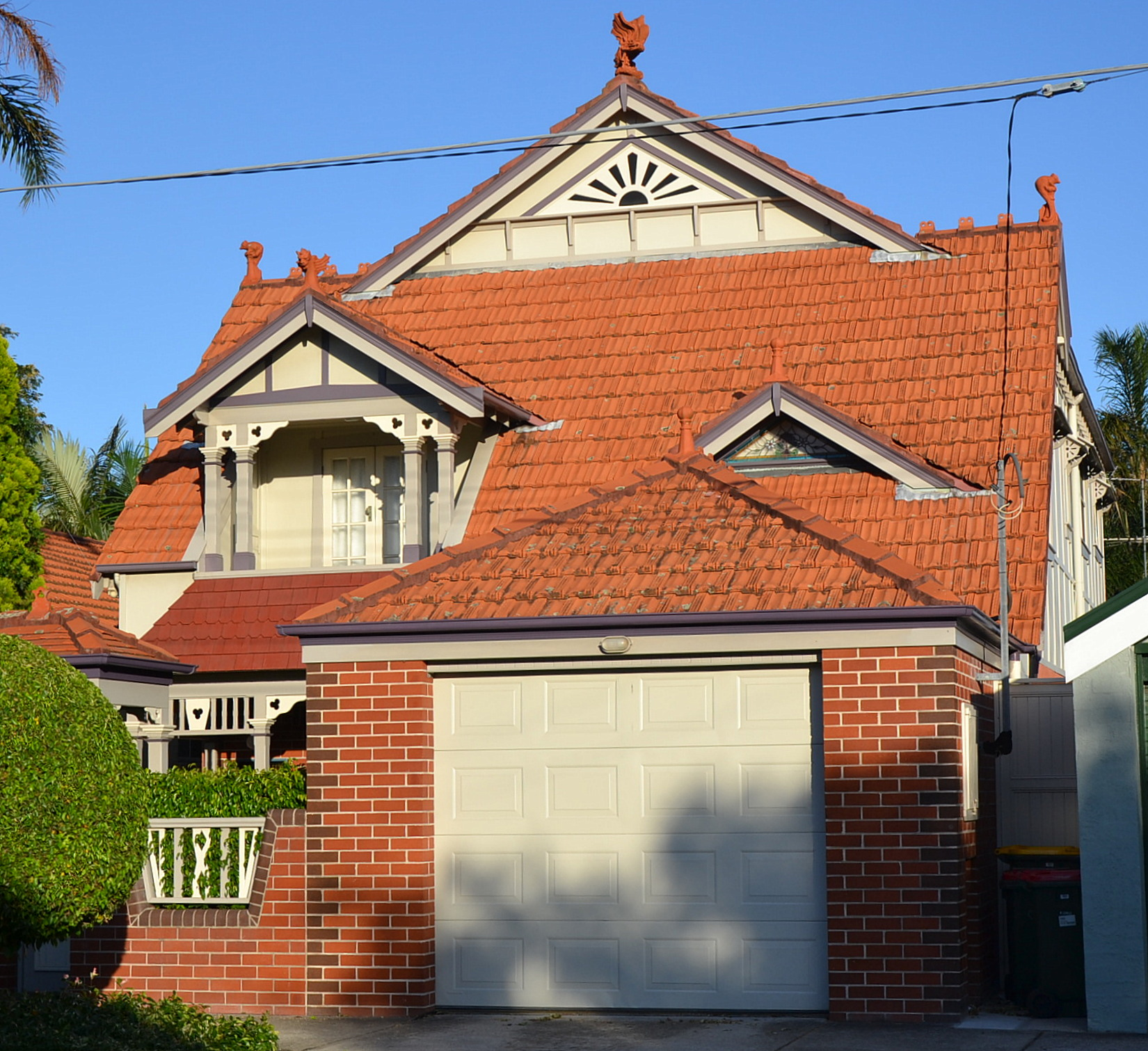
Federation revival house in Kingsford

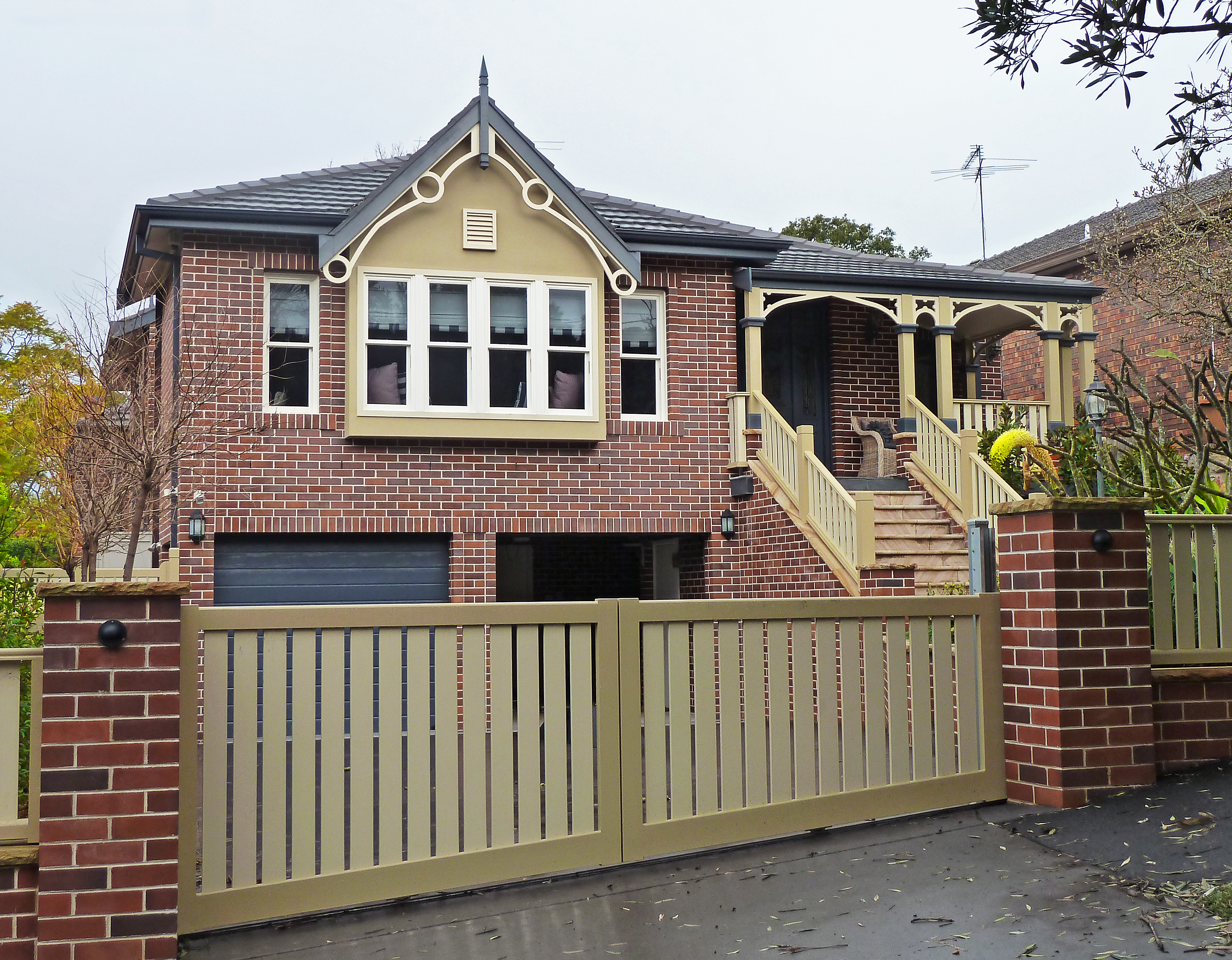
Bungalow style Federation Revival home in Roseville

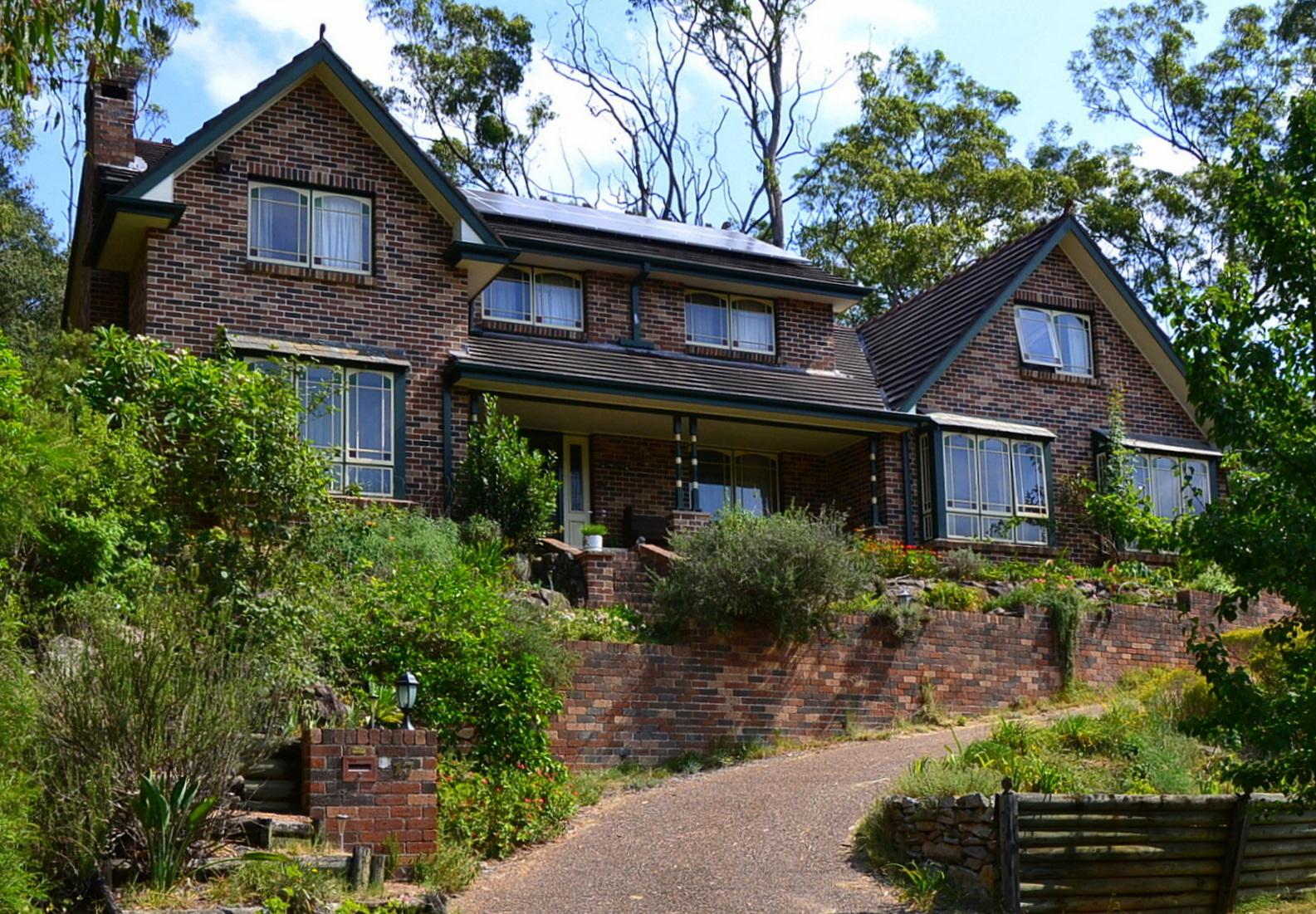
Glenbrook

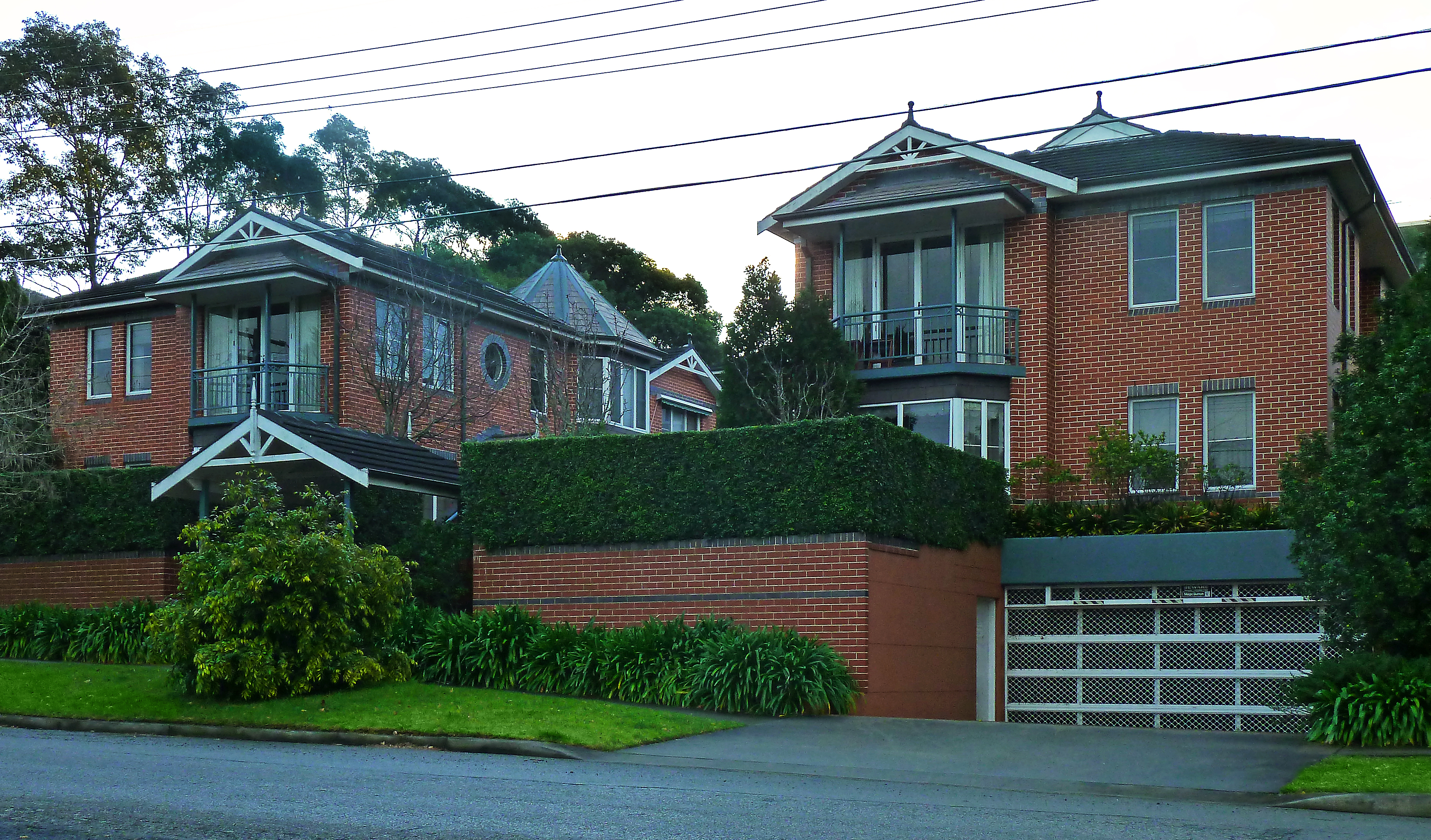
Federation revival apartments in Lindfield (1996)

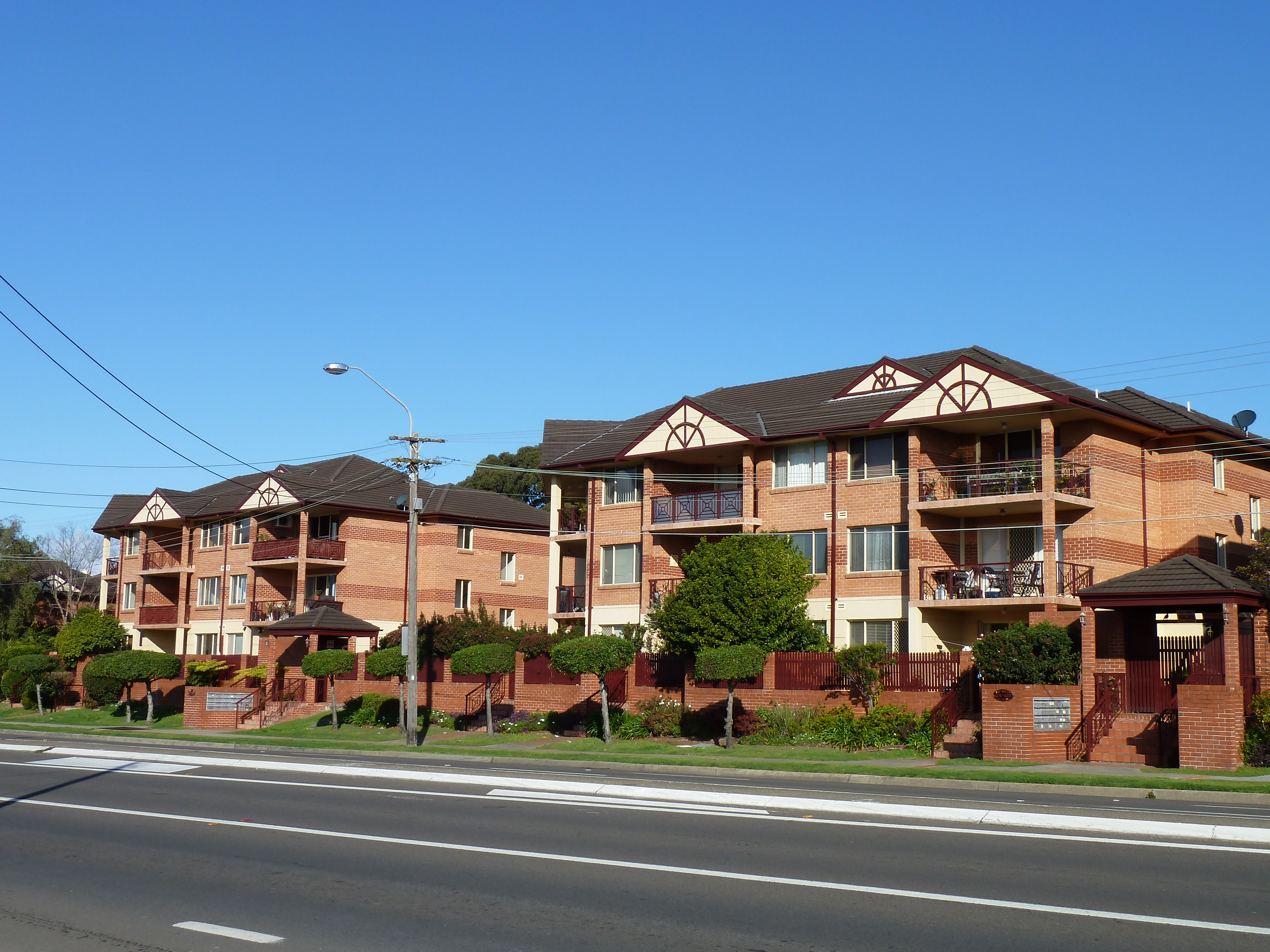
Federation revival apartments in Miranda (c. 1993)

==== Pavilion style ====
The Pavilion style house is characterized by a simple rectangular, box shaped volumetric style, open plan interior with glass replacing much of the wall space. Windows are often also steel framed. The transparency of the walls makes it well suited for blocks with privacy and/or views. Open patios are an integral part of living area, and like the rooms, they are orientated according to the aspect. Roofs are often low pitched roof and skillion.

The style was a favorite of architect Harry Seidler who favoured walls of rendered brick however it is also well suited to a steel, fiber cement, and corrugated iron treatment. This approach often requires the thinness of steel framing to create the desired look.

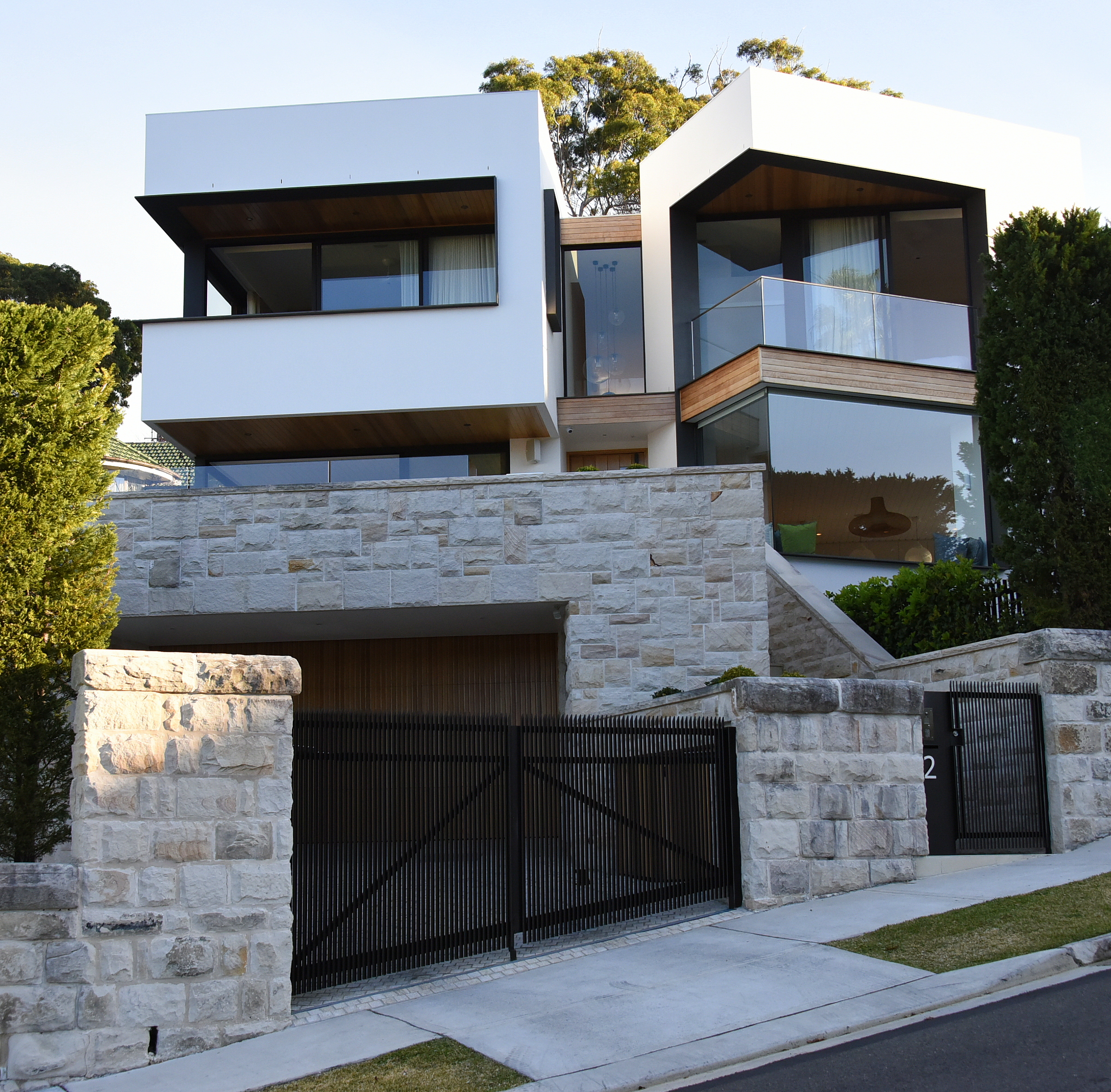
Contemporary pavilion style house with an angled facade in Mosman

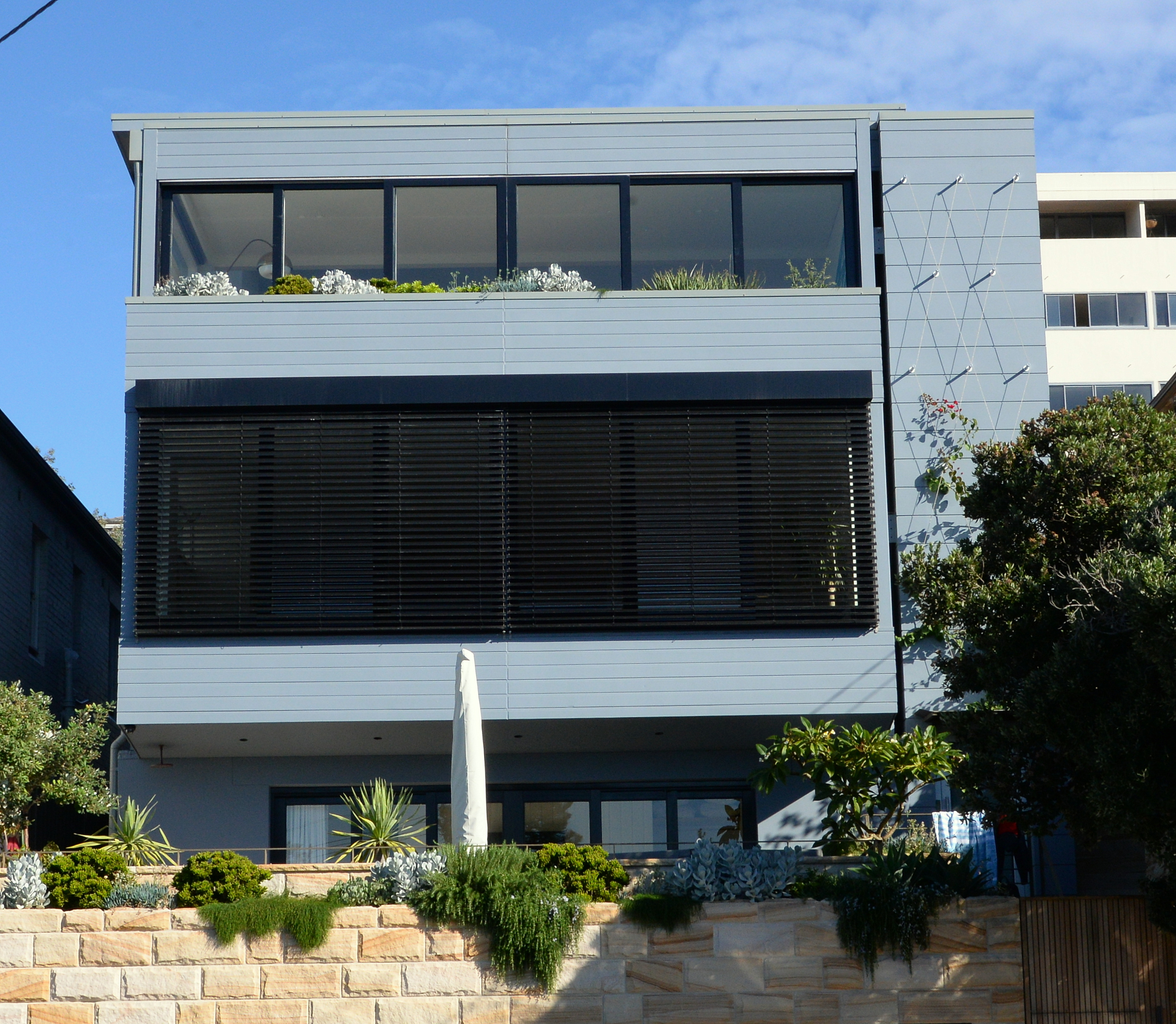
House in Coogee

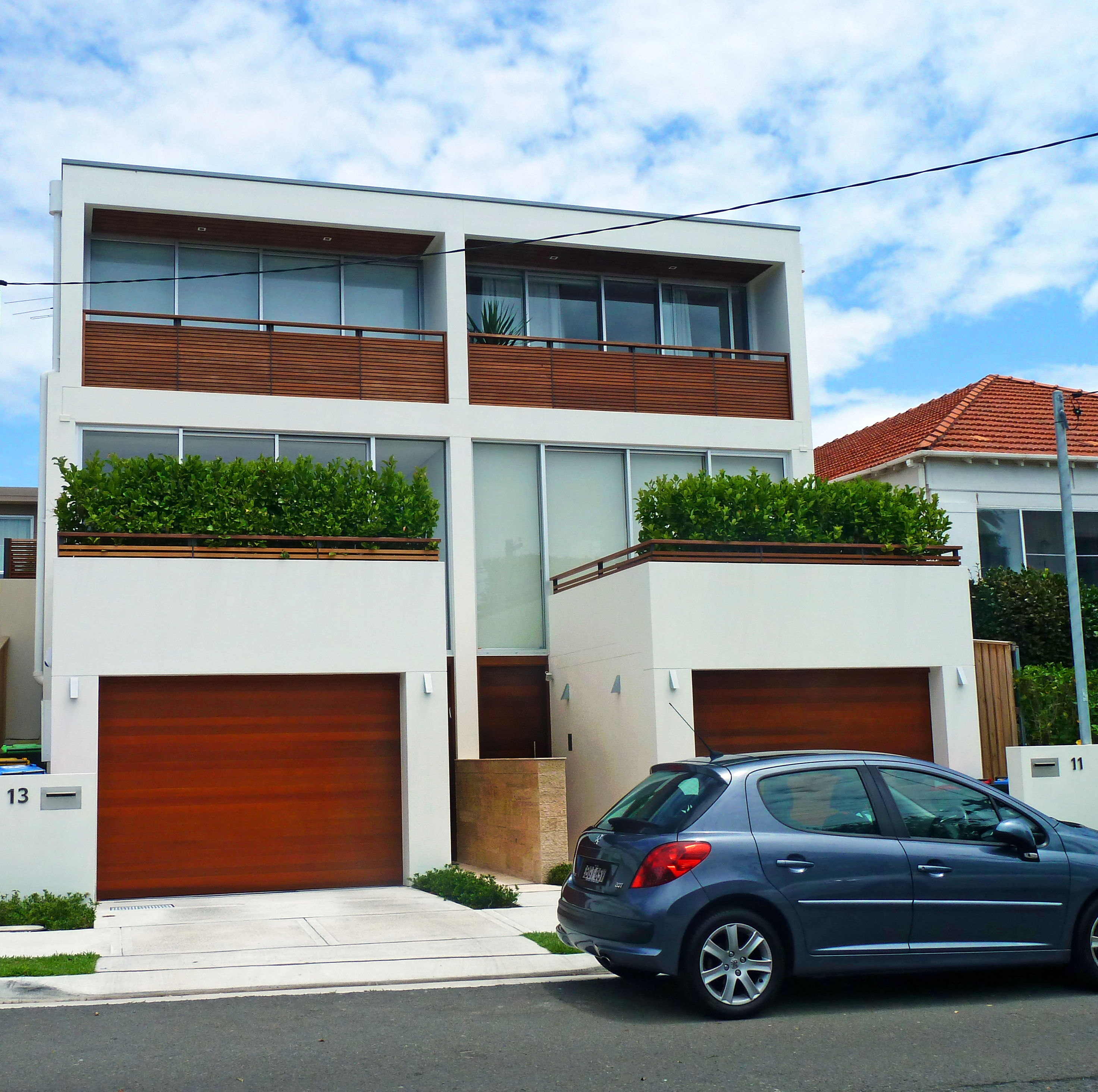
Cement rendered pavilion style semi-detached houses in Dover Heights

==== Australian Nostalgic ====
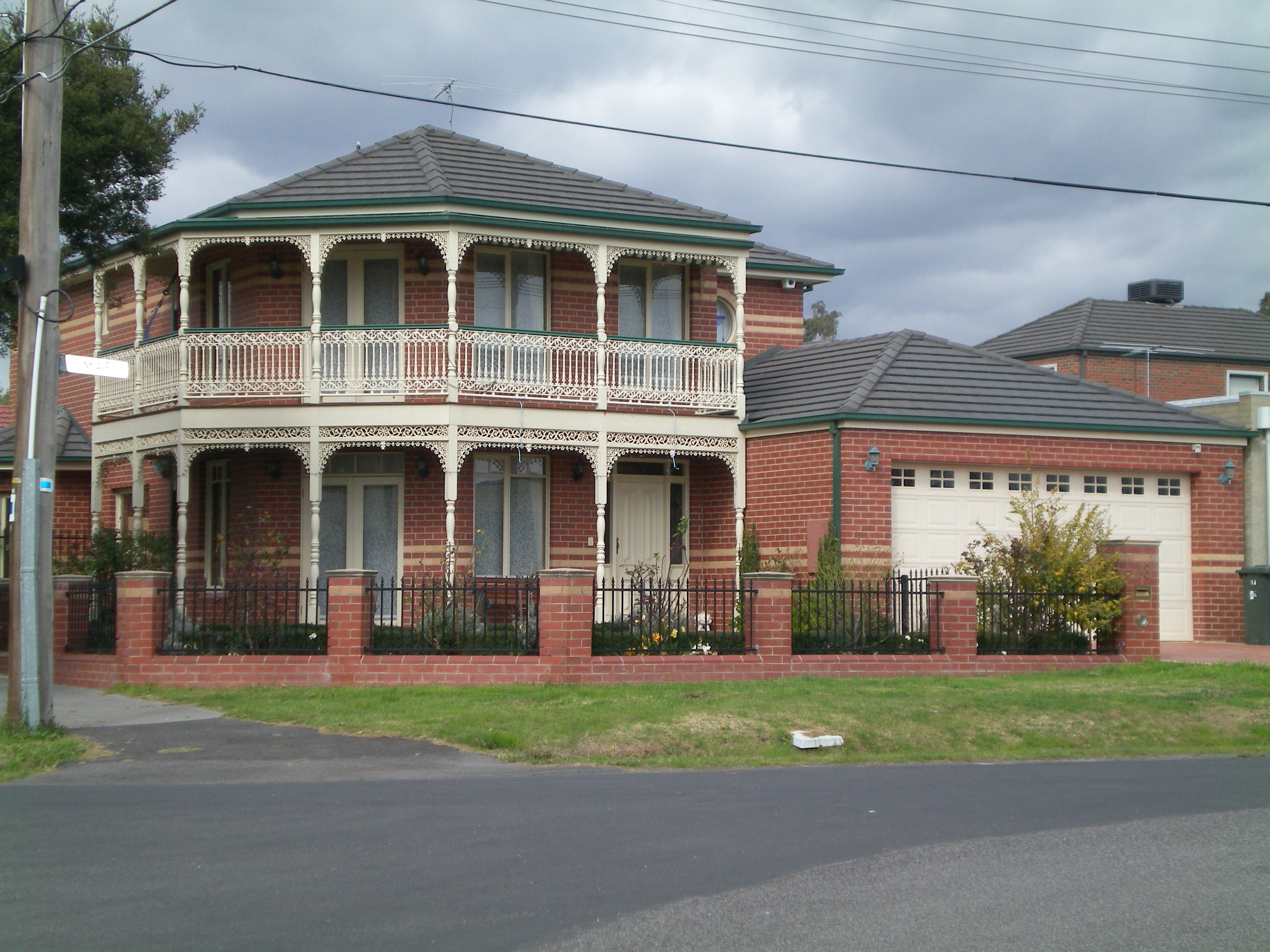
Victorian Filigree Revivalist house, Templestowe. Lacework and polychrome brick pay homage to Victorian era architecture.

==== Painted and rendered triple-fronted brick veneer ====
This style of house has a brick facade (exterior) with timber frames supporting interior walls, usually of gyprock. Roofs are always hipped or gabled and tiled. As mentioned previously in this article, this style, without the painted and rendered brick facade, dominated suburban architecture in the 1950s – 1960s.

Due to its familiar and cheap construction, it still is the dominant style in housing estates and many consider the style the scourge of Australian domestic architecture. The basic style has been made more interesting by rendering and painting, adding more angles, variations in roofing, porticos, verandahs, and bay windows. Large homes, two-story homes of this style have often been described as McMansions.

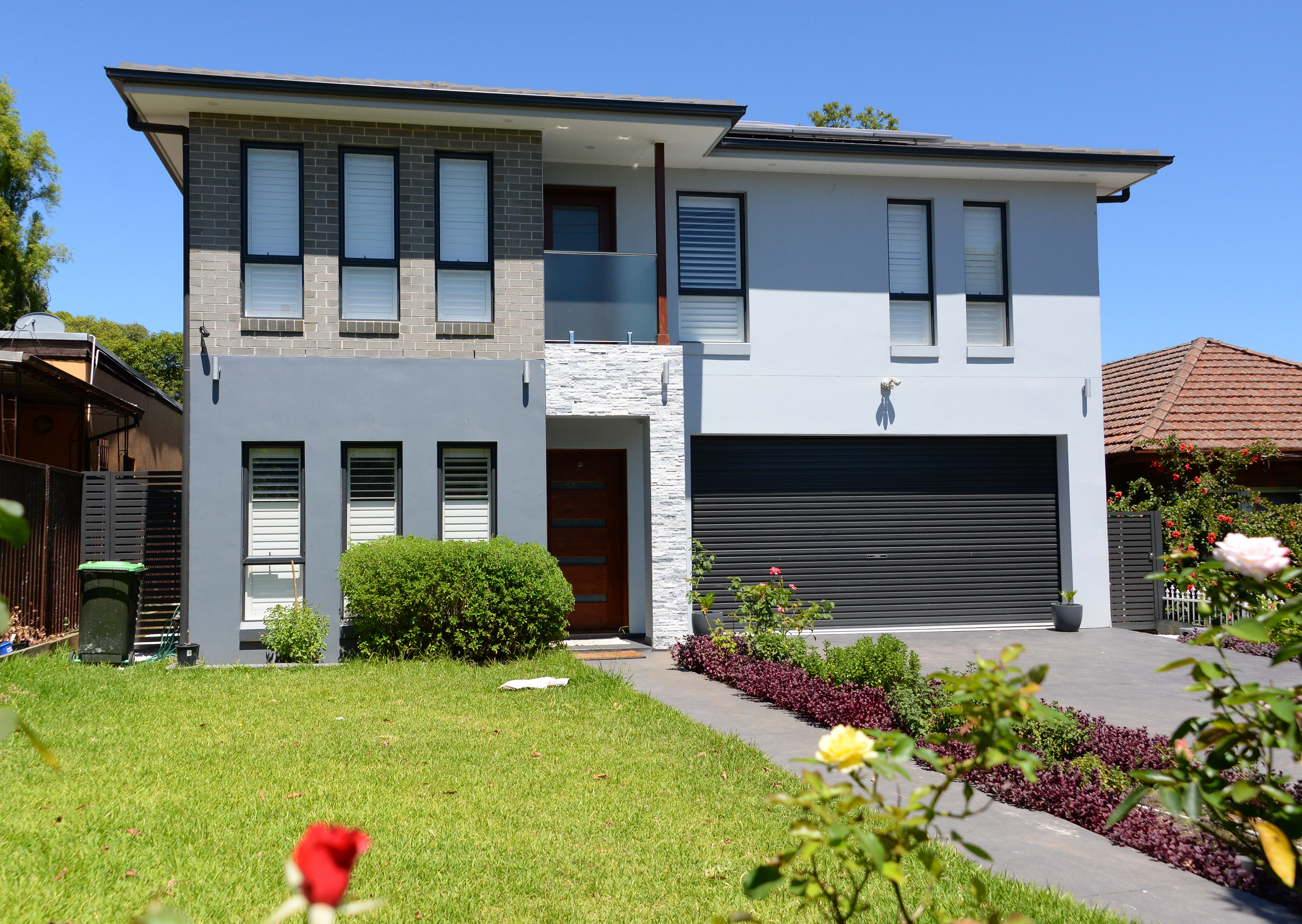
Typical modern suburban home in Flemington

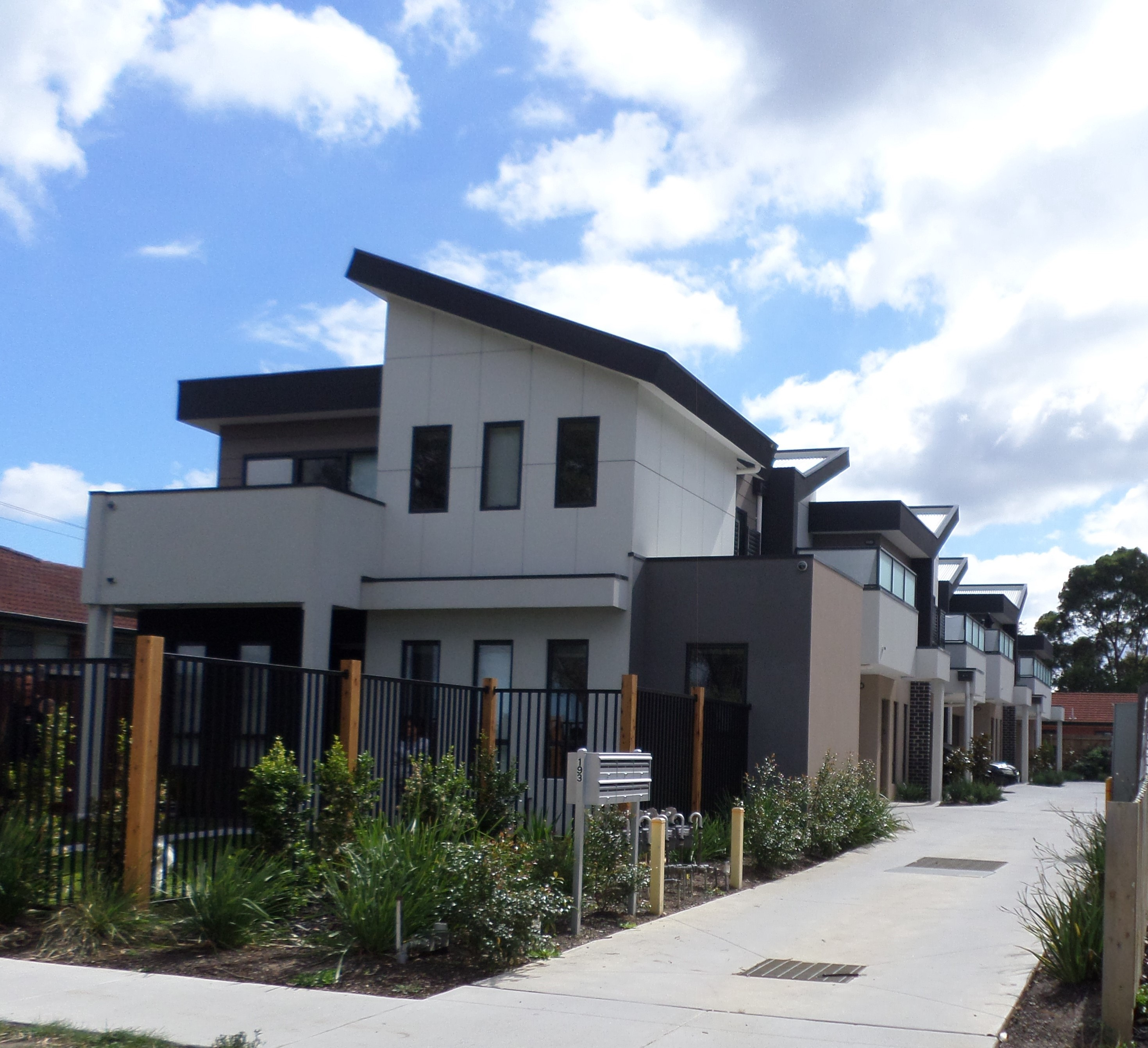
Modern Townhouses in Victoria

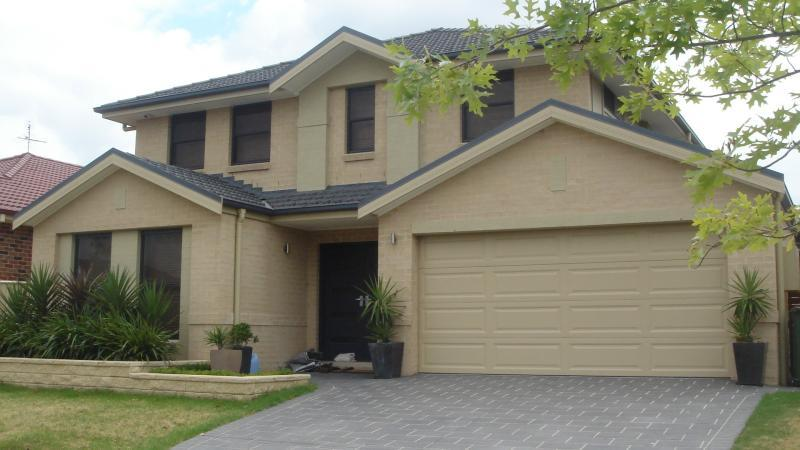
McMansion style house

==== Brutalist ====
Evolving from the modernist style in postwar Europe, Brutalist architecture emphasises bare building materials and function over form. Buildings of this style commonly feature exposed, unpainted concrete; solid, geometric forms; exaggerated slabs; massive forbidding walls; and a predominantly monochrome palette.

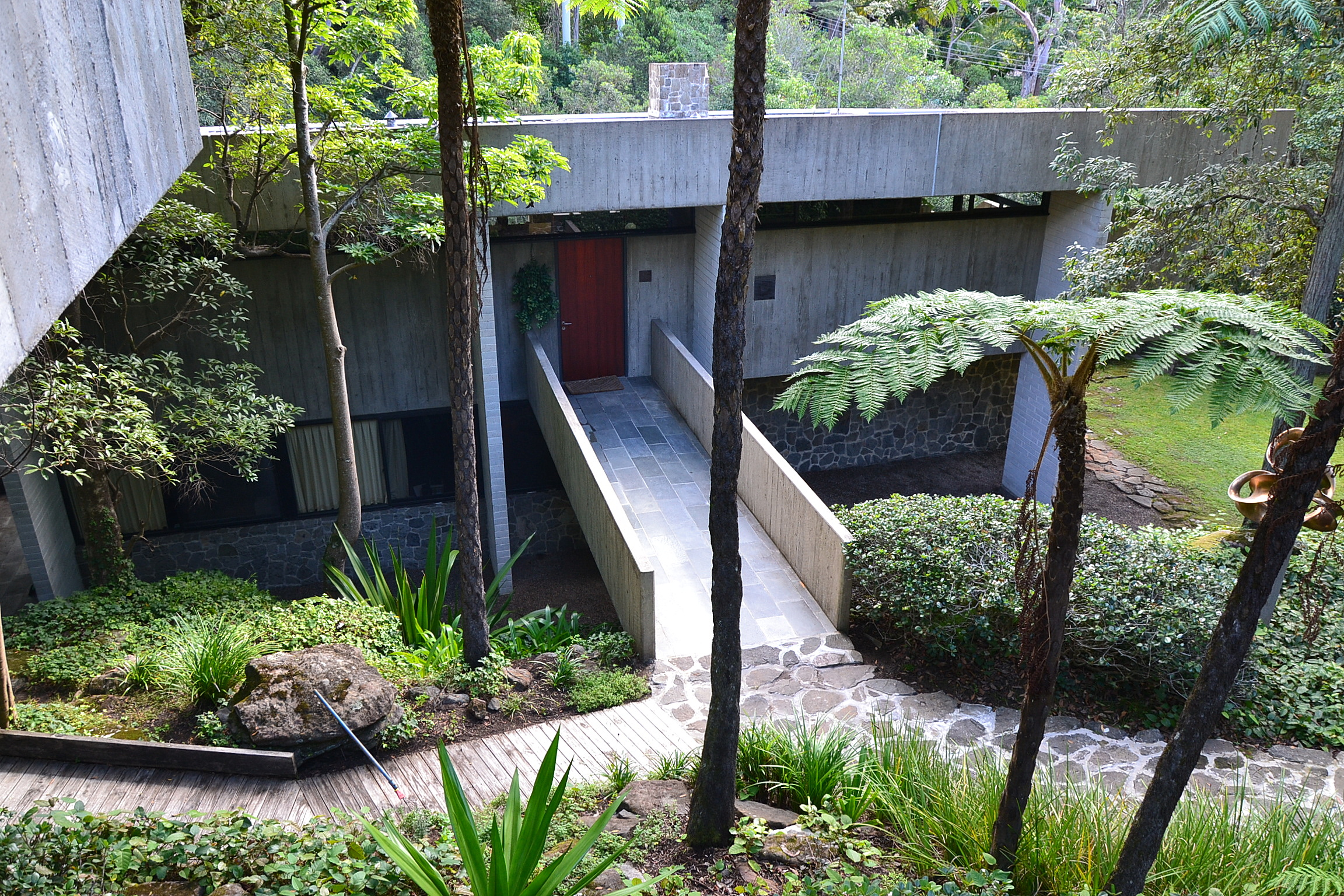
Harry and Penelope Seidler House, Killara Completed 1967.

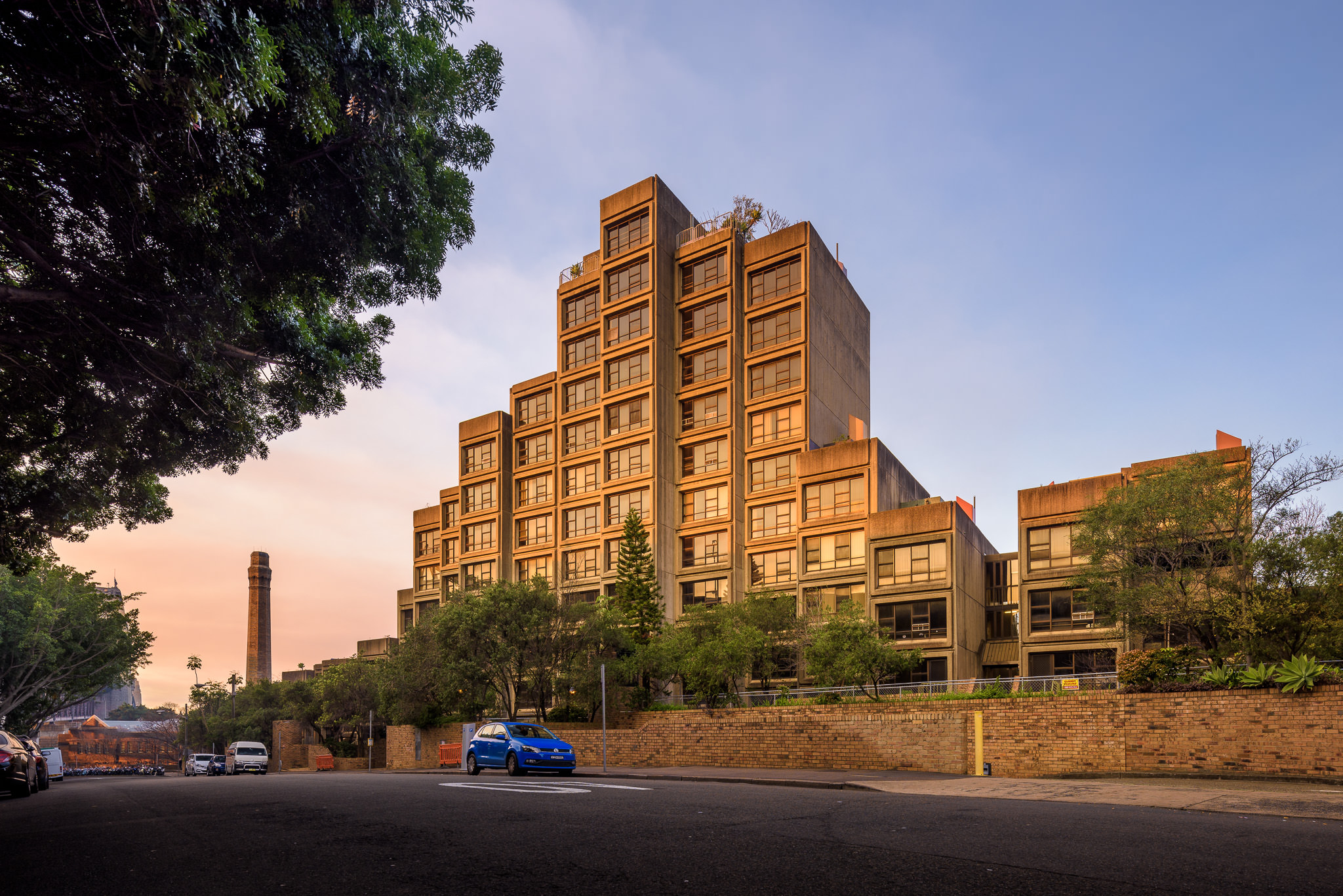
Sirius Building, The Rocks Designed by Tao Gofers and completed in 1980

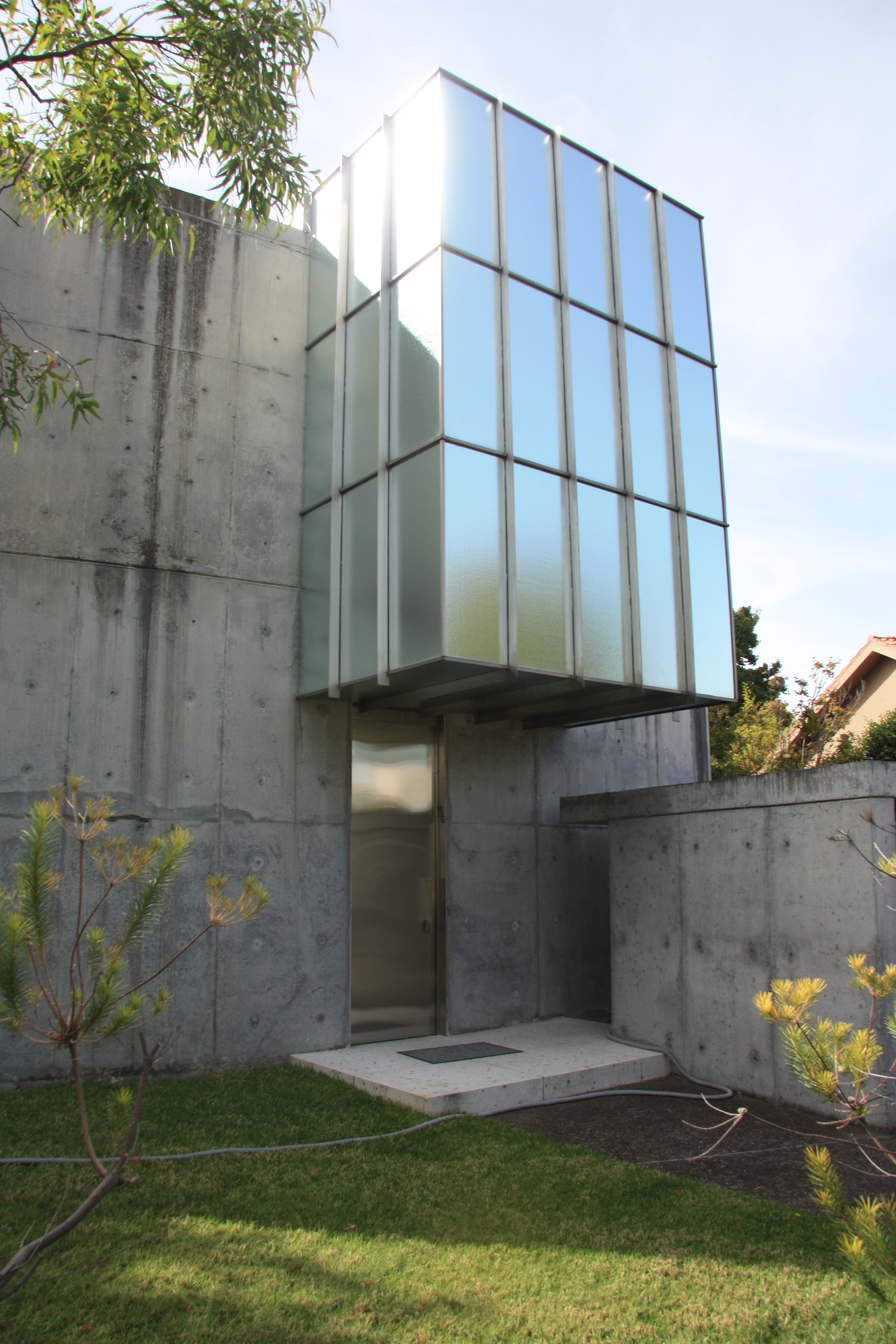
Gottlieb House, late Brutalist, completed in 1990–94. Caulfield.

==== Highrises ====
Highrise residential buildings became popular in Australia in the late 20th century, due to the trend towards increasing density in cities. New construction technology allowed modernist styles to be adapted to taller buildings with larger footprints, with Harry Seidler a key proponent of the style in Australia. Around the turn of the 21st century, highrise residential architecture became largely indistinguishable from commercial skyscraper styles.

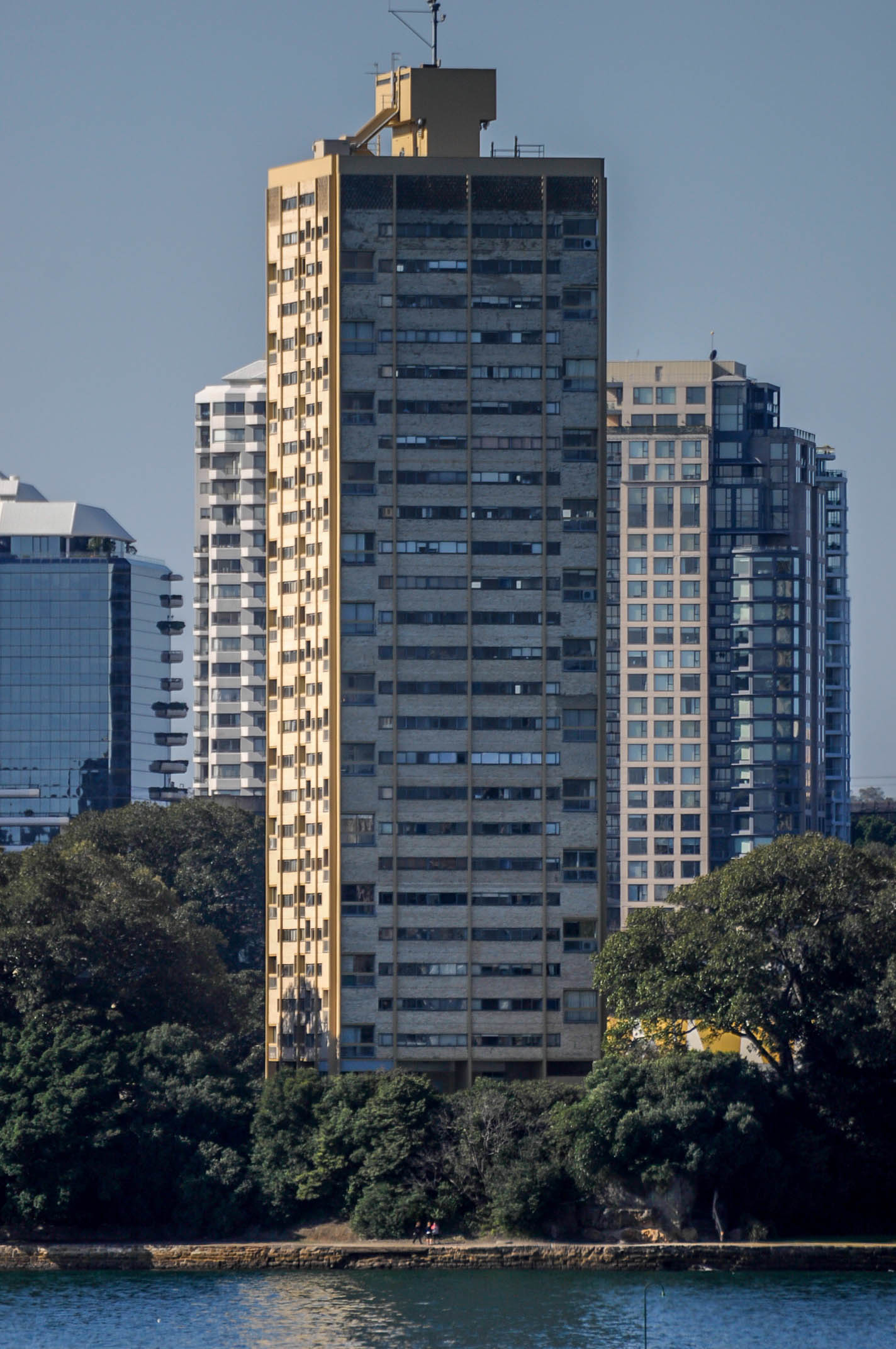
Blues Point Tower (1962), McMahons Point. Designed by Harry Seidler.

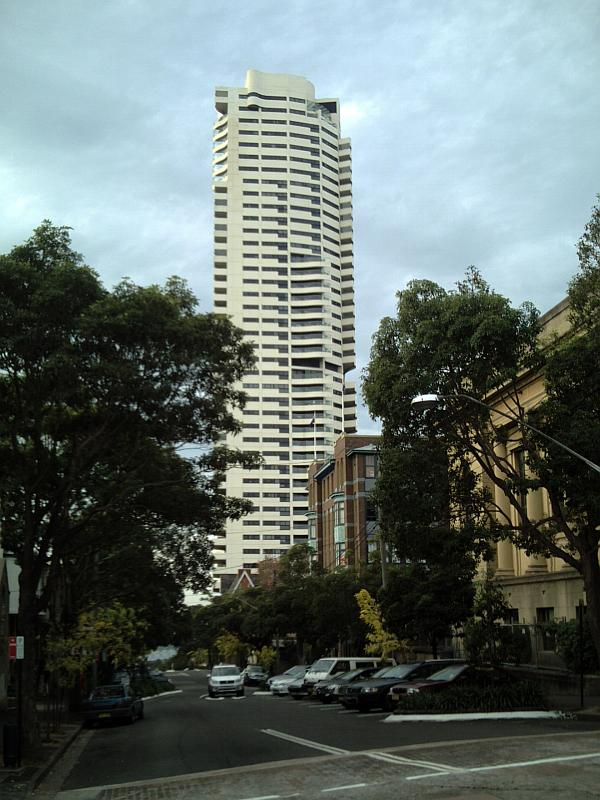
Horizon Apartments (1990–1998), Darlinghurst. Also designed by Harry Seidler.

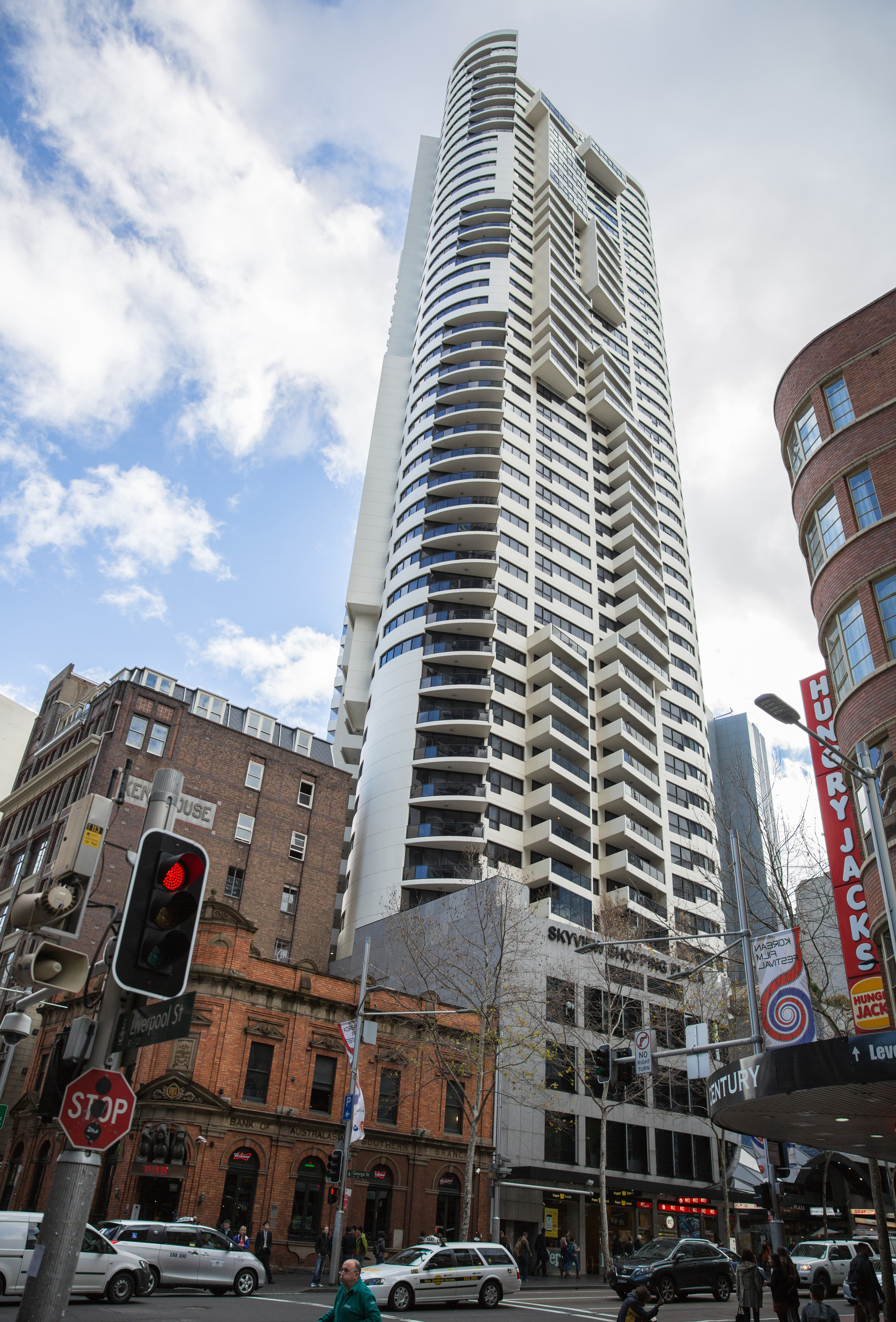
Meriton Tower (2001–2006), Sydney.

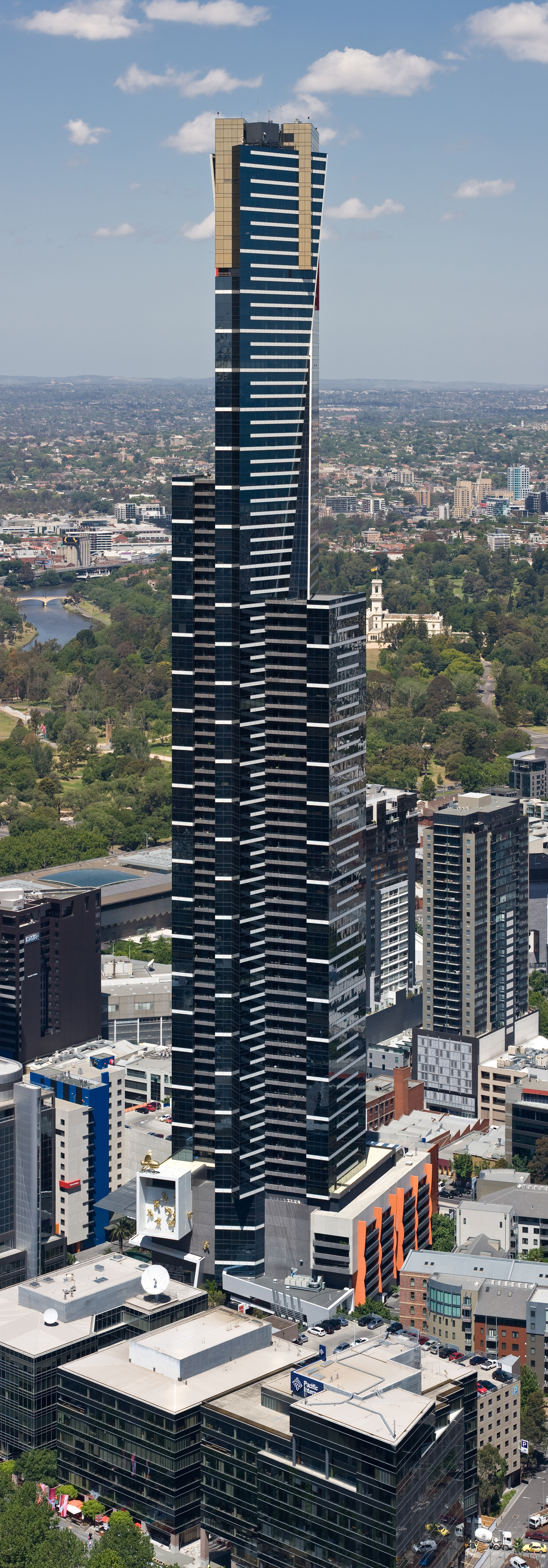
Eureka Tower (2002–2006), Southbank.

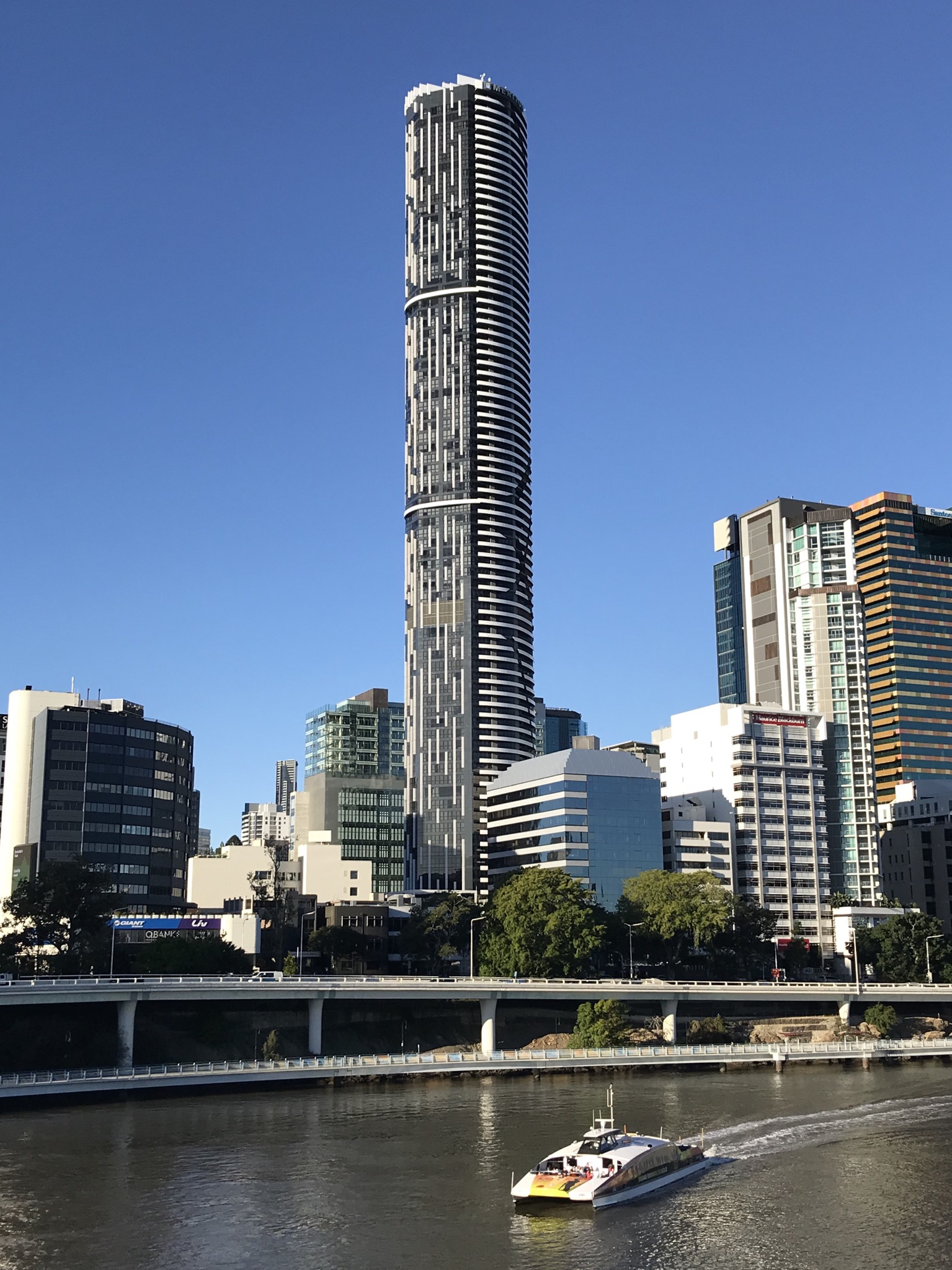
Infinity Tower (2014)

== Contemporary styles ==
Contemporary styles from 2000 onwards are often eclectic, incorporating a variety of influences such as classical revival, post modernism, modernism and pop architecture, without holding rigidly to the prescriptions of any one style.

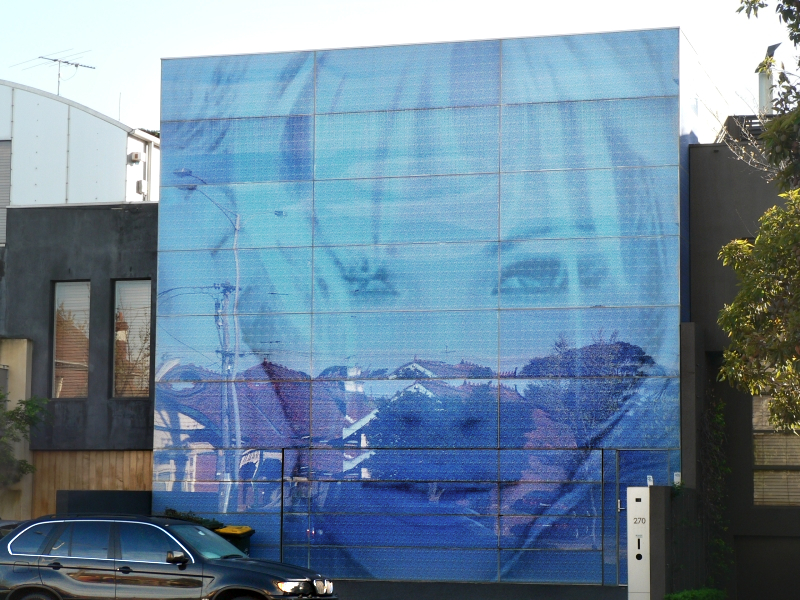
Newman House (2000) in St Kilda. Contemporary Post modern pop architecture

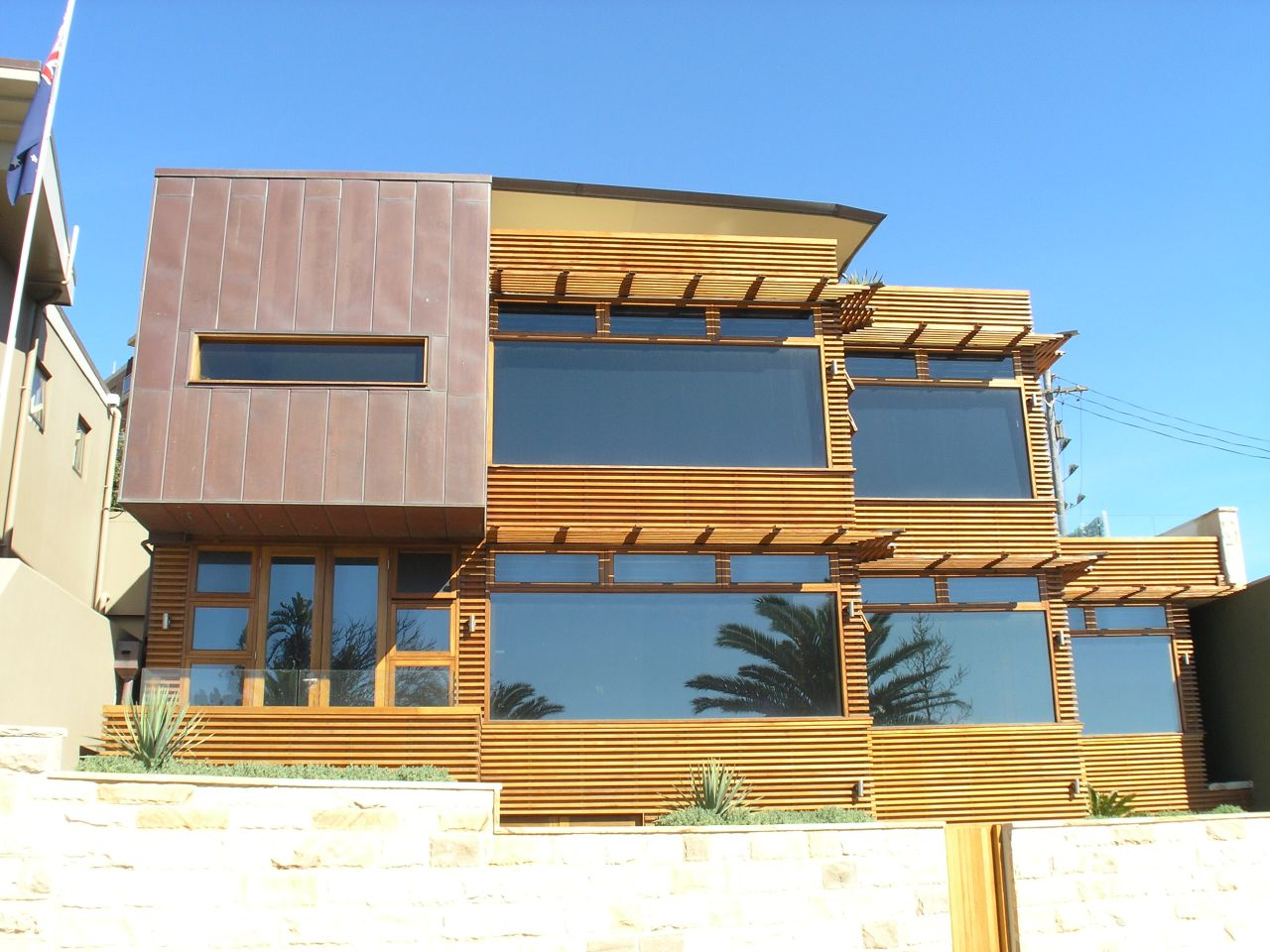
A house in Bronte with modernist influences

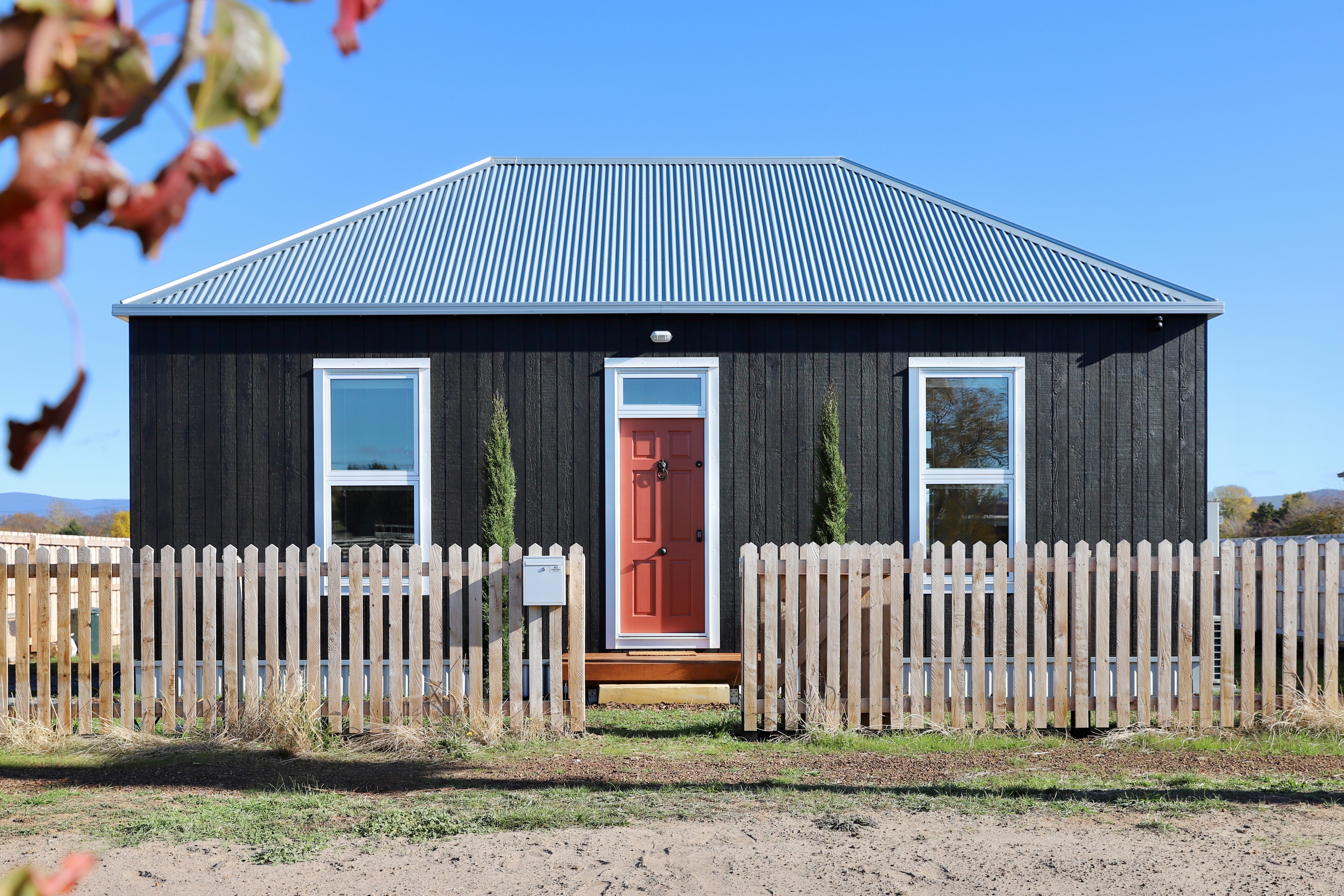
Tasmanian House 3 (2025) in Tasmania. Contemporary traditional, Tasmanian Georgian vernacular.

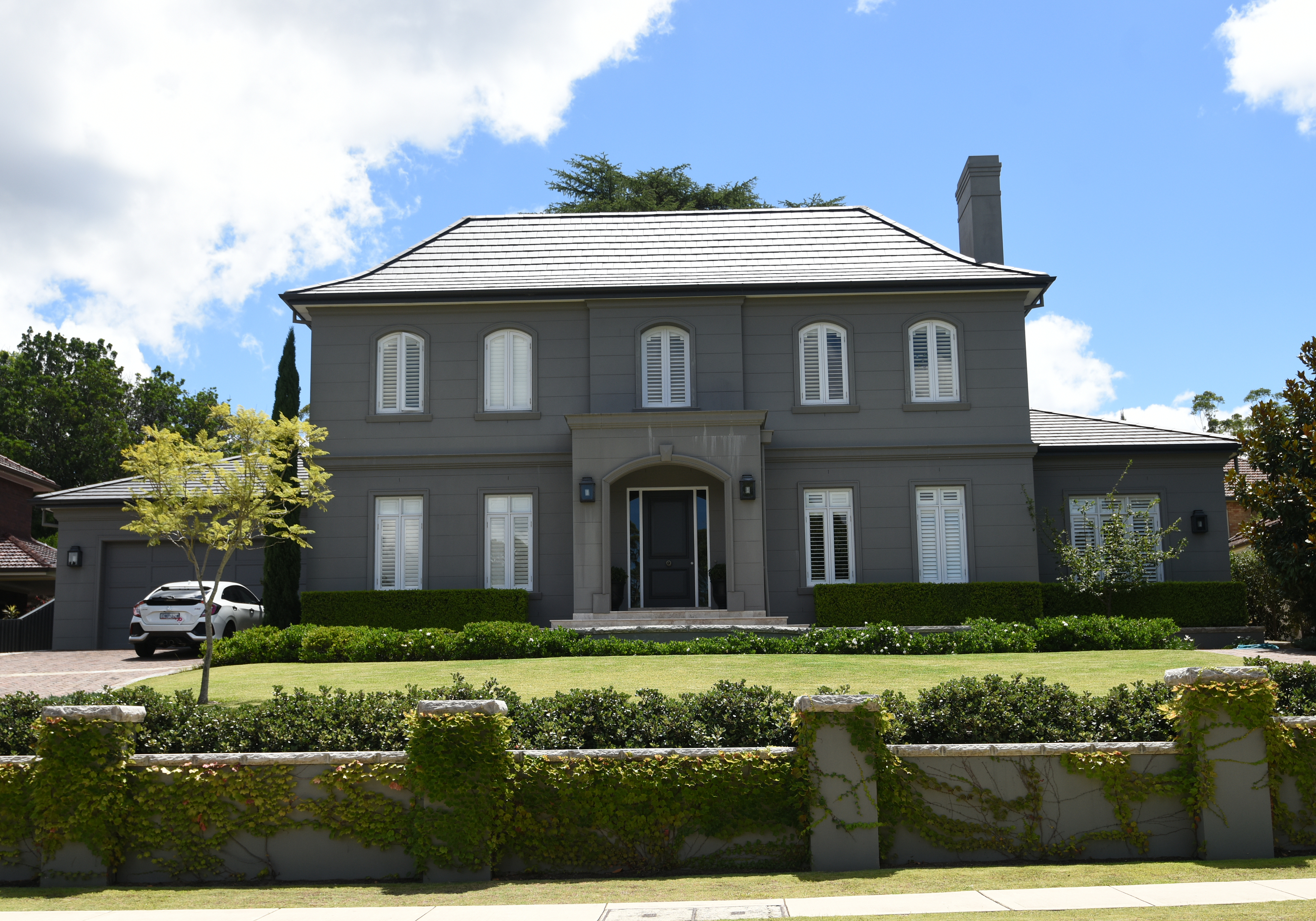
House in Cheltenham. Contemporary classical revival house with strong Regency influences.

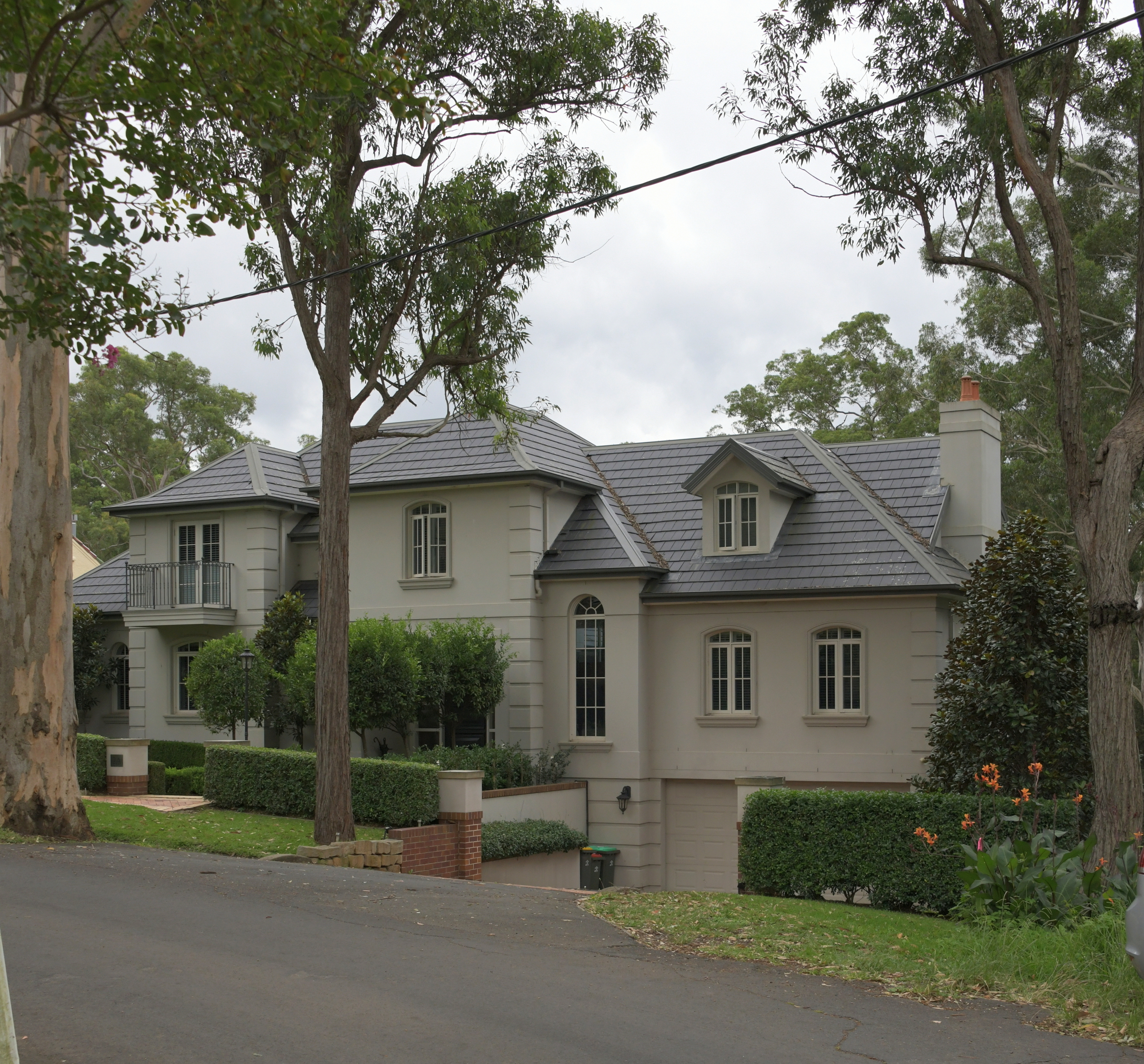
House in Beecroft. Mix of various revival styles.

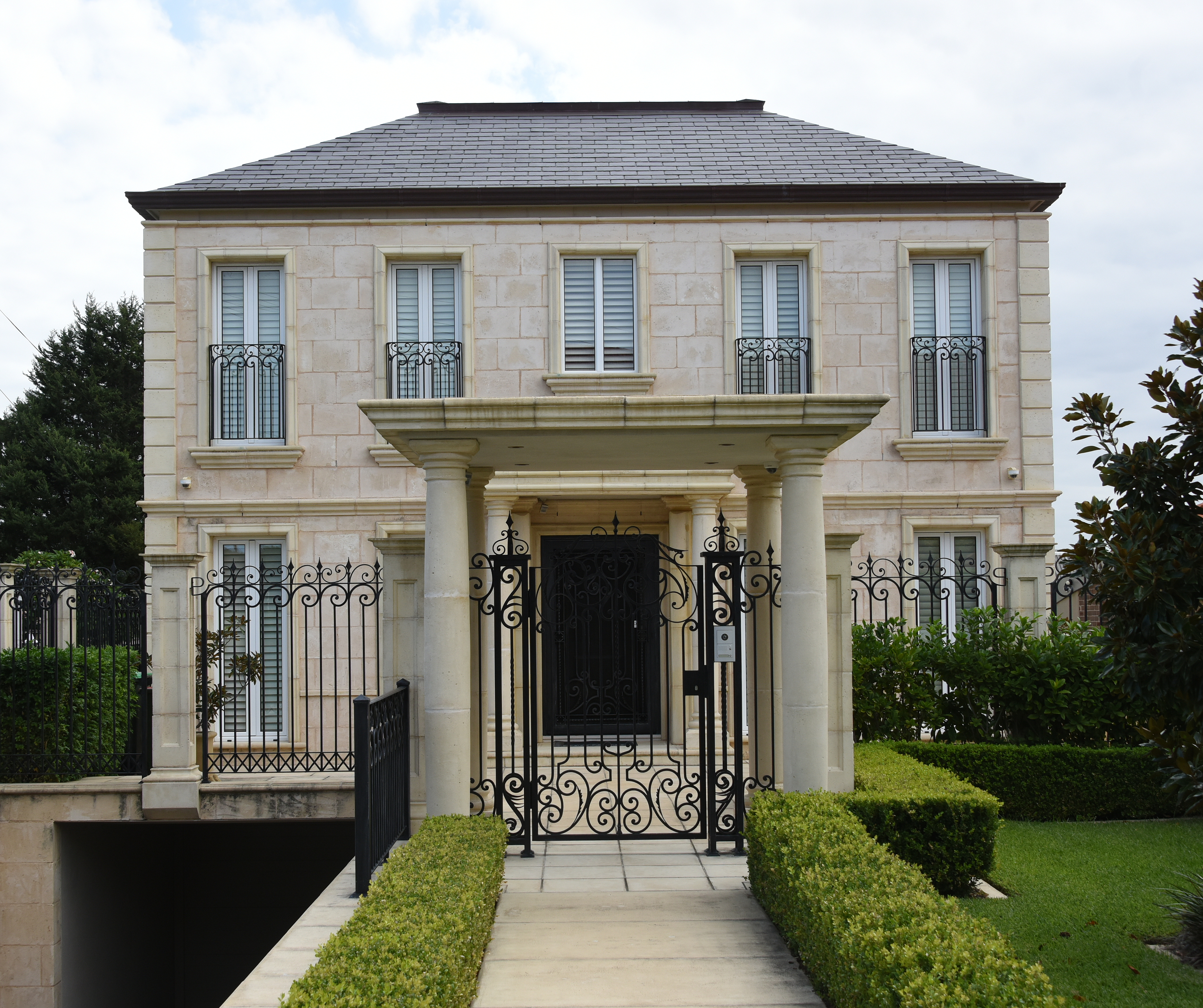
House in Sans Souci. Modern adaptation of French provincial style.

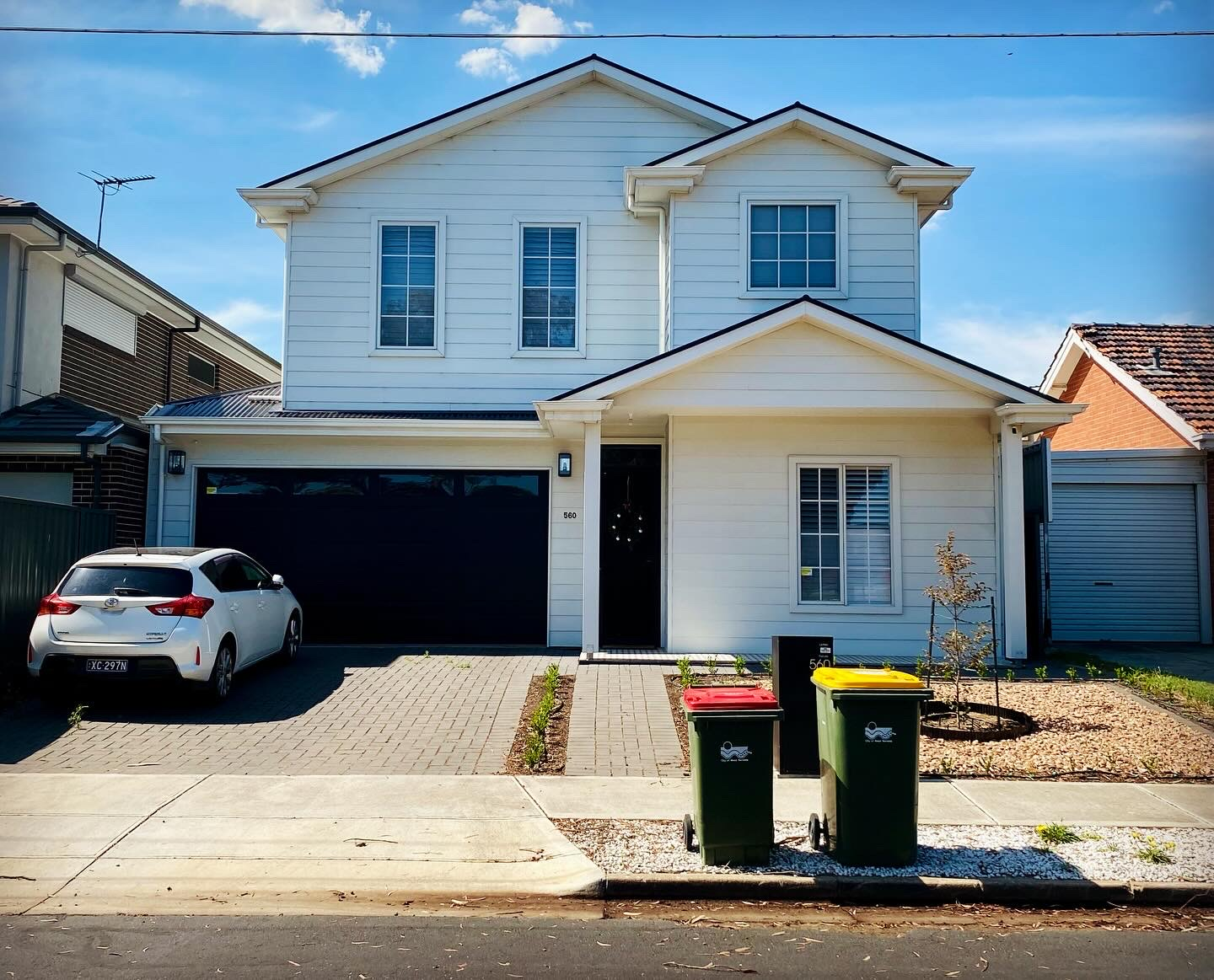
House in Lockleys - contemporary weatherboard

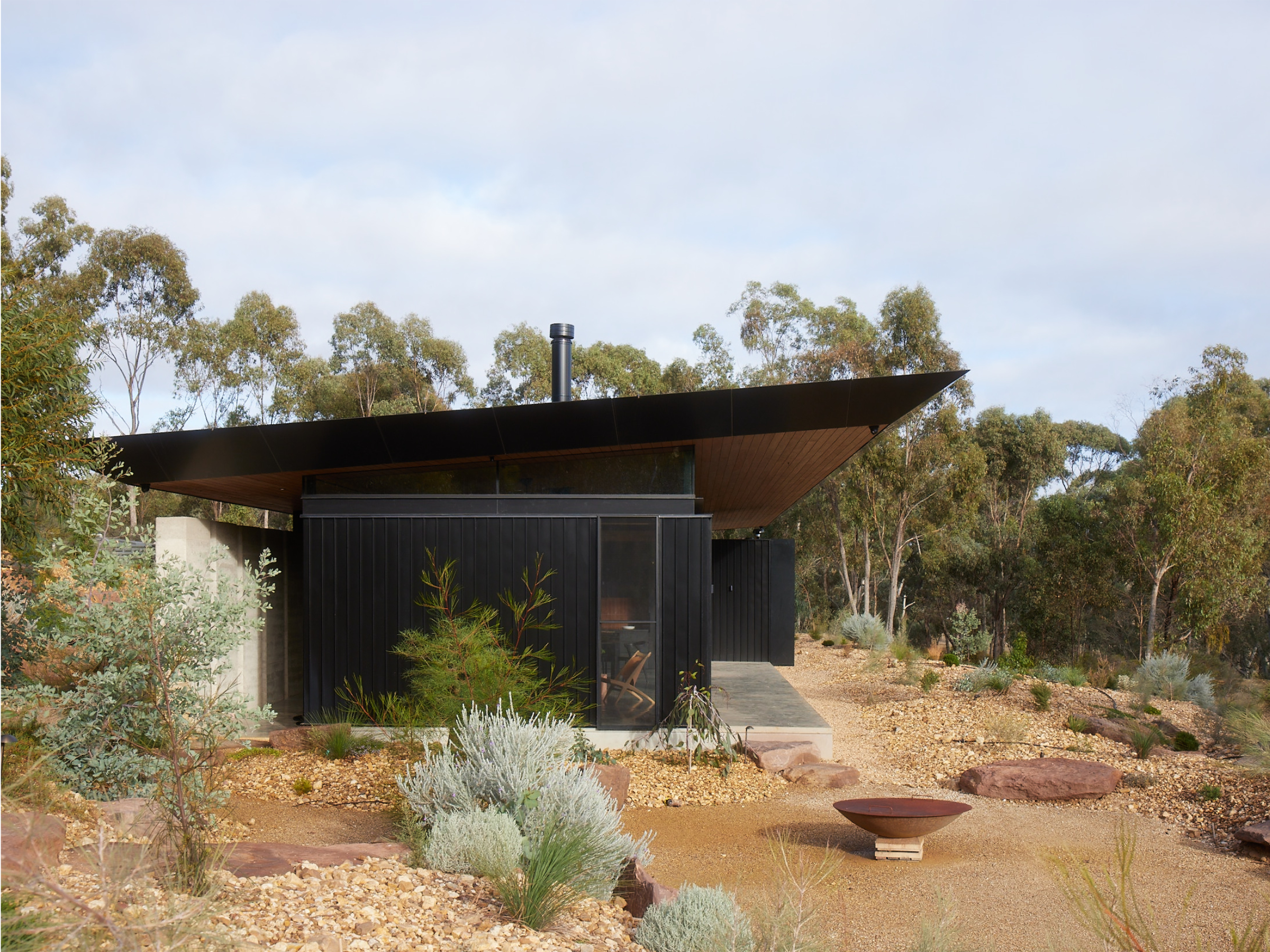
Modern beach house (2026) in St Andrews Beach, Victoria

=== Adaptive ===
With widespread gentrification and urban renewal in the late 20th and early 21st century, conversions of disused industrial and commercial buildings to residential has become widespread. This includes adaptive reuse conversions which retain to some extent the form of the existing building.

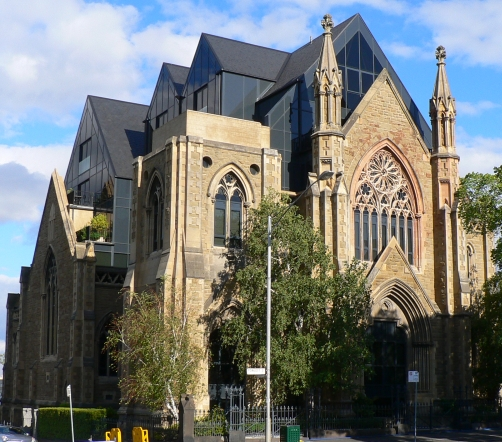
Former Cairns Memorial Church (1895) turned apartments (1988)

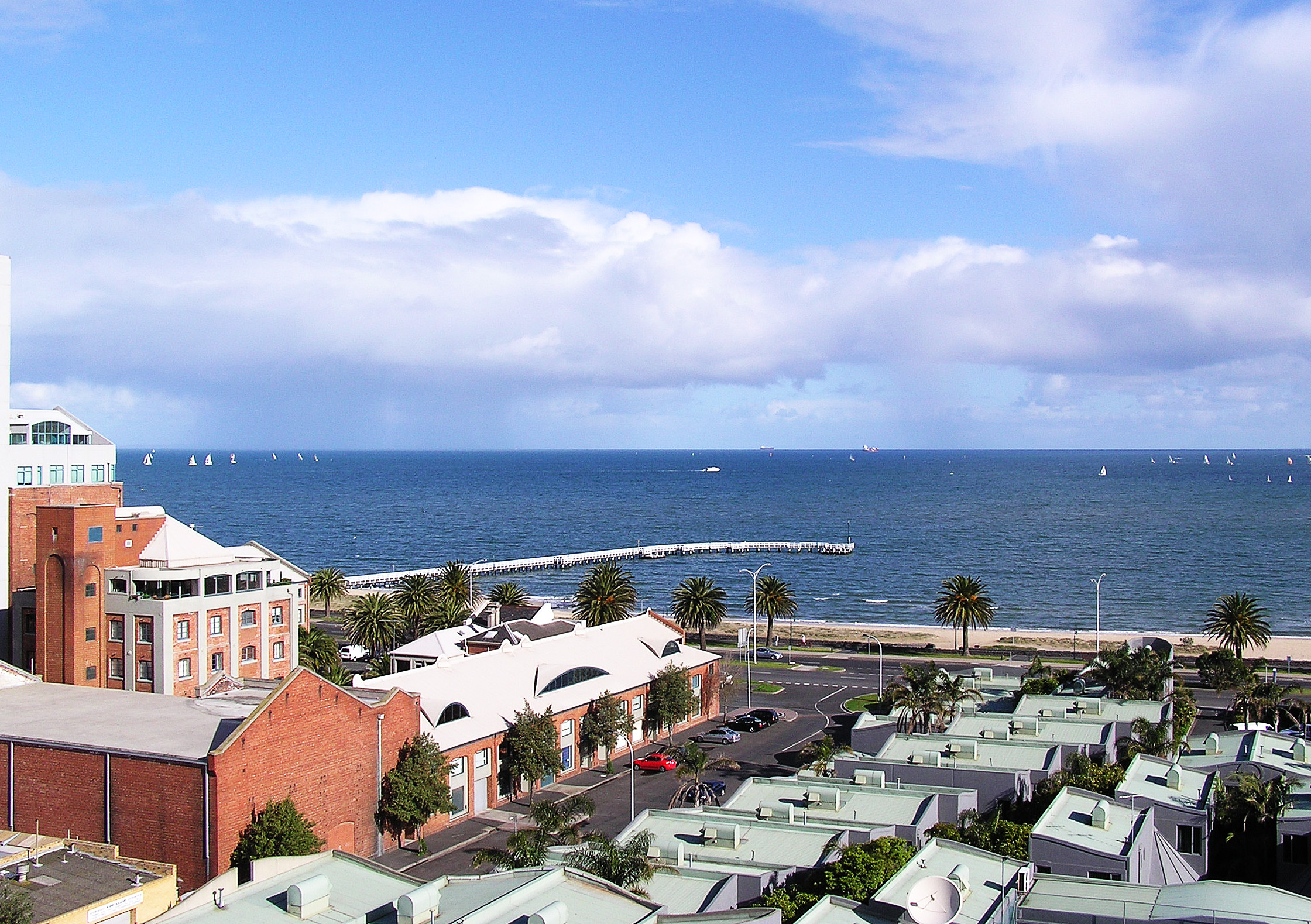
Sandridge Bay Towers, Port Melbourne (left) 1891 brick sugar factories and warehouses turned fashionable apartments (1996)

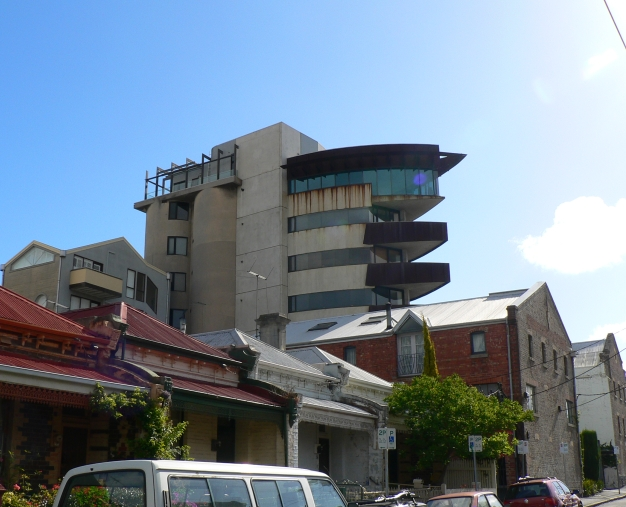
The Malthouse, Richmond an innovative conversion of 1920s silos by Fender Katsalidis (1997)

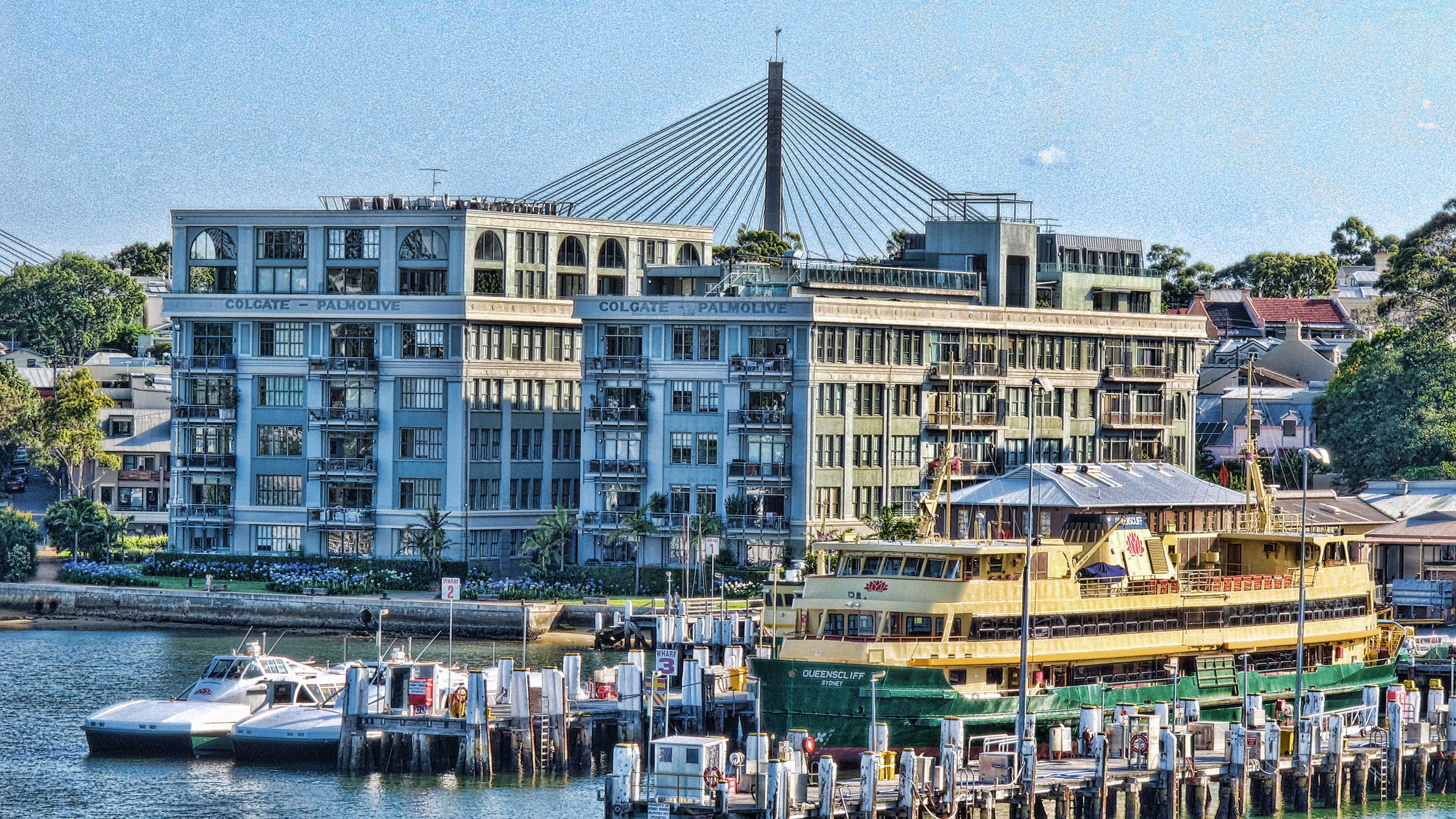
Former Colgate-Palmolive factory in Balmain, after residential conversion (1998)

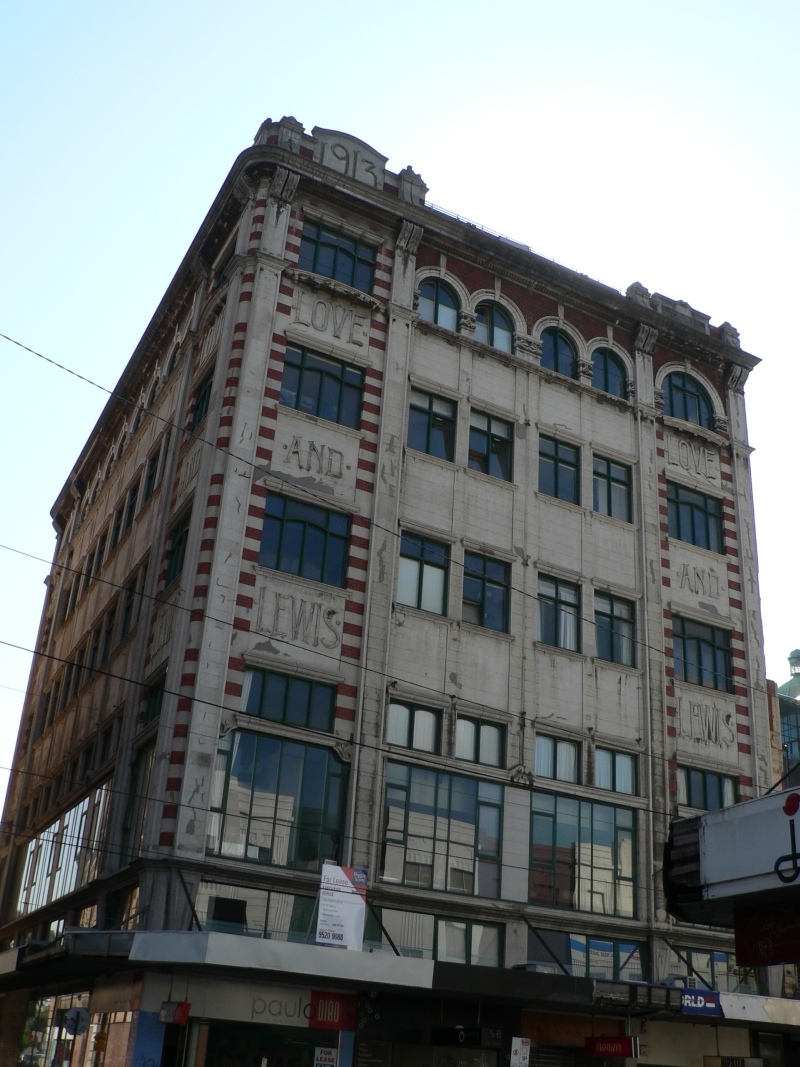
Love & Lewis building Prahran, a 1913 department store converted to apartments (2004)

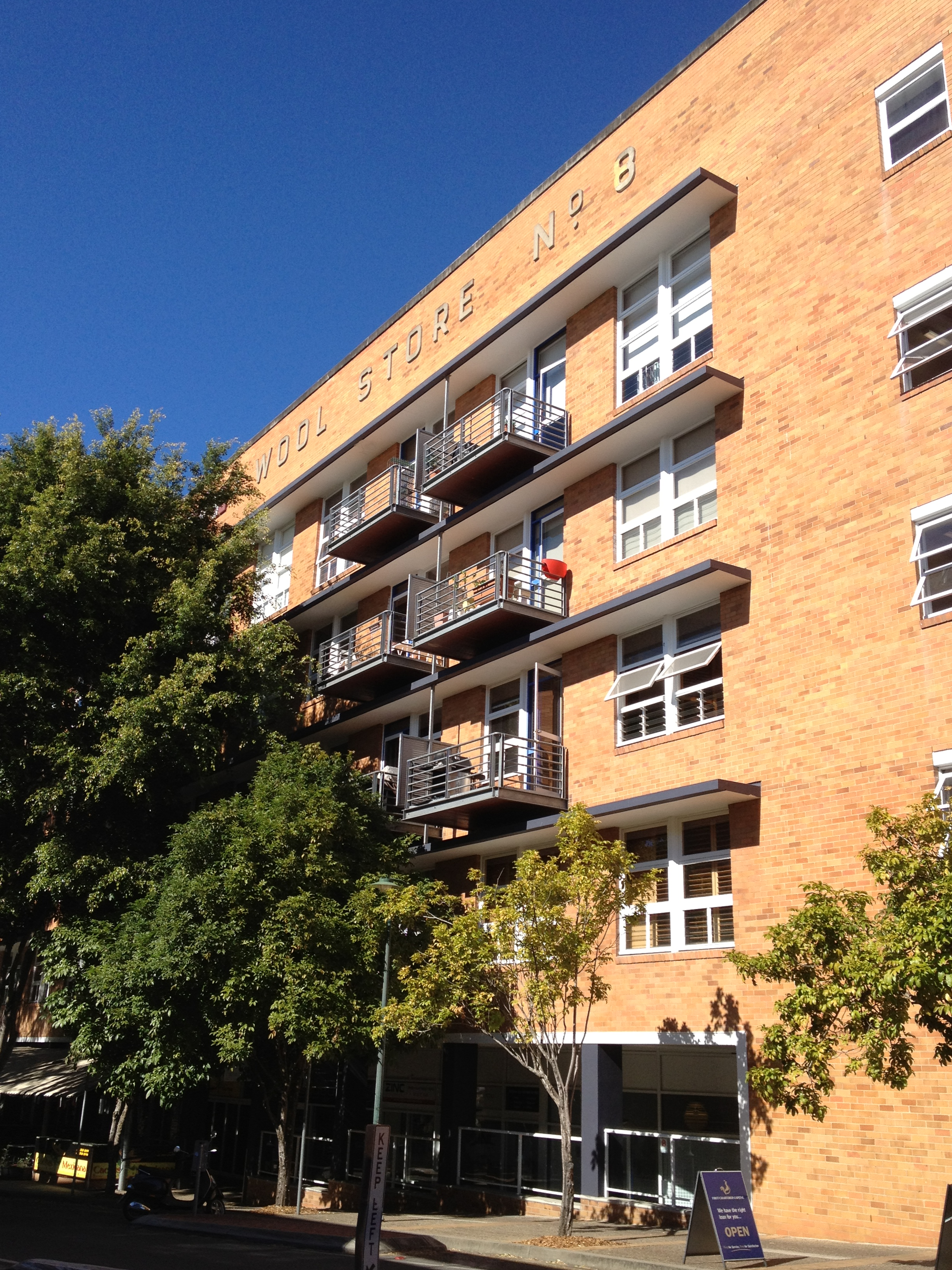
One of many old woolstores converted as part of the Urban renewal in Woolstore Precinct, Teneriffe (2004-2010)

== See also ==
- Terrace houses in Australia
- Architecture of Sydney
- Architecture of Melbourne

== Bibliography ==
- Murcutt, Glenn (1995). "Works and Projects", Thames and Hudson.
- Drew, Phillip (1996). "Leaves of Iron",Angus & Robertson
- Picket, Charles (1997). "Fibro Frontier", Powerhouse.
- Irving, Robert (1985). "The History and Design of the Australian House", Oxford University Press
- Perse, JN (1981). "House Style in Adelaide – A Pictorial History", Stock Journal Publishers.
