= Spring Hill Baths =

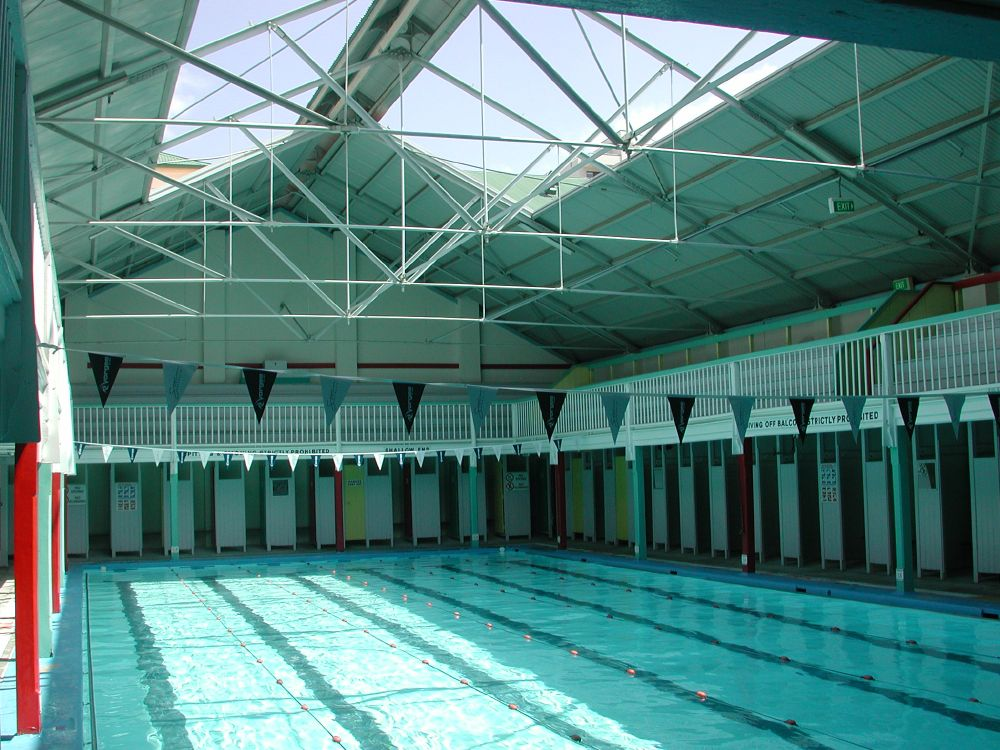
- Spring Hill Baths, 2004

- Location within Queensland Location within Australia
- 27.4599°S 153.0213°E
- Location: 14 Torrington Street, Spring Hill, City of Brisbane, Queensland, Australia

History
- Design period: 1870s–1890s (late 19th century)
- Built: 1886–1913
- Built for: Brisbane Town Council

Site notes
- Architect: Thomas Kirk
- Owner: Brisbane City Council

Queensland Heritage Register
- Official name: Spring Hill Baths, City Baths, Arthur Street, Municipal Baths, Spring Hill
- Type: state heritage (built)
- Designated: 21 October 1992
- Reference no.: 600313
- Significant period: 1886, 1902, 1913 (fabric); 1886–ongoing (social)
- Significant components: swimming pool, changing rooms/dressing shed, residential accommodation – staff quarters
- Builders: William M Park

Spring Hill Baths is a heritage-listed swimming pool at 14 Torrington Street, Spring Hill, City of Brisbane, Queensland, Australia. It was designed by Thomas Kirk and built from 1886 to 1913 by William M Park. It is also known as Arthur Street City Baths and Municipal Baths at Spring Hill. It was added to the Queensland Heritage Register on 21 October 1992.

== History ==
Constructed for the Town of Brisbane in 1886 at a cost of £2,526, the Spring Hill Municipal Baths provided the city with its first inground public baths. They replaced in popularity the older floating baths in the Brisbane River, and provided an important hygiene/sanitation facility in Spring Hill.

They were erected during the 1880s expansion of Brisbane municipal works, which included construction of the second of the Spring Hill Reservoirs and an extensive drainage system in Spring Hollow.

Enoggera contractor William McCallum Park built the structure to a design by city engineer Thomas Kirk, completing the work in August 1886. On the evening of 9 December 1886 and amid great ceremony, the baths were opened by the Mayor of Brisbane, James Hipwood, who took the first plunge. The Brisbane Courier reported:

His Worship the Mayor appeared in regulation bathing costume at 8 p.m., and was loudly cheered as he stepped briskly along the springboard and took a "header" into the bath. This was the opening ceremony as far as the formal business of the evening was concerned. The Mayor was followed by Alderman Watson, Mr. C. E. Birkbeck (Ithaca Divisional Board) and the representatives of the Musgrave and Brisbane Amateur Swimming Clubs. The civic dignitaries disported themselves with grace and vigour equal to that of the most lissome of the clubmen, and the mayor and Alderman Watson treated the spectators to a few spurts up and down the bath at a pace which was quite surprising.

One of the principal reasons for establishing the Arthur Street (now Torrington Street) bath was its location above the Spring Hollow (Water Street) drain, installed in 1884, the waste water from the baths providing a daily cleanse. River water from Petrie Bight was pumped to a small reservoir at the top end of Albert Street, then gravity fed down Spring Hill to the Hollow, where it was stored in holding tanks (now boarded over) at the far end of the baths. Each evening the pool was drained and every morning the water was replenished in a process lasting several hours. This system of flushing the Spring Hill drain was employed for three-quarters of a century.

Not until 1914 did the city council install a salt-water supply scheme to which the baths were linked. As the Brisbane River grew more polluted, chemicals were added to the pool water, and finally a filtration system was installed in 1961.

In 1902 a gallery and diving platform were erected at the western end of the baths, necessitating the removal of several of the dressing sheds. These were re-instated in 1913 when the gallery was extended around three sides. Also in 1913 an awning was erected over the front entrance. The present club room extension appears to have been added at a later date.

In 1962 a male toilet block was added along the northern elevation, and the caretaker's accommodation was extended.

Until construction of the Wickham Street Municipal Swimming Baths in 1926, the baths at Spring Hill remained the venue for most of Queensland's competitive swimming, both school and amateur. In 1927 it was one of the first pools in Australia to allow mixed bathing, and it remains one of the oldest still in use. In recent years the club room has accommodated an art gallery, and the pool has been used for a variety of purposes, including community theatre.

== Description ==
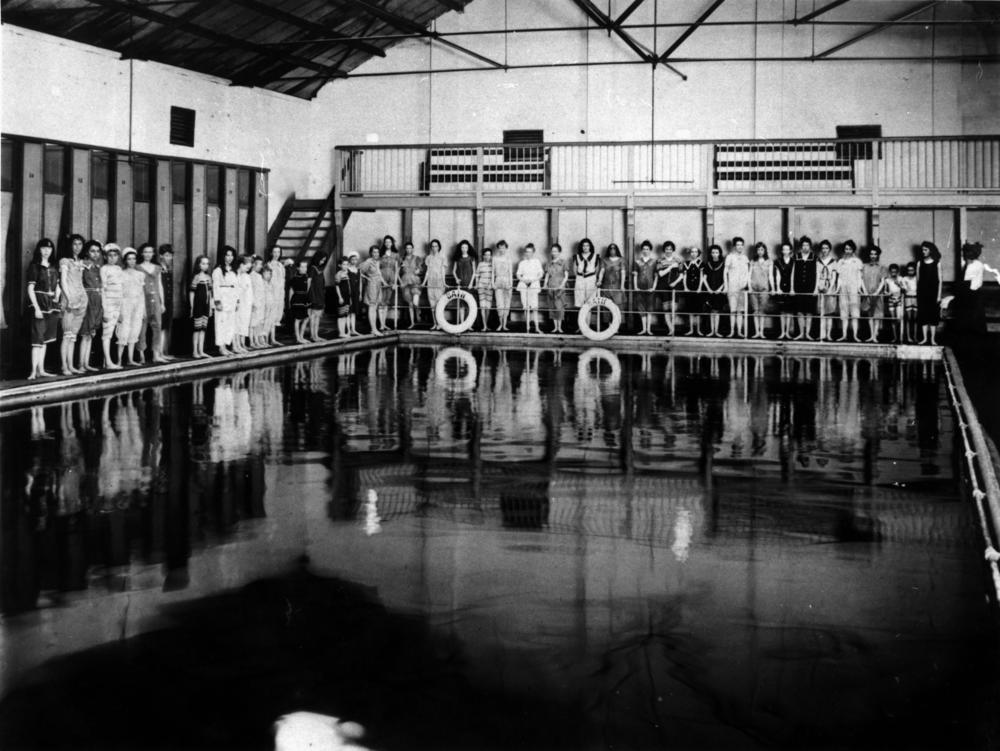
Spring Hill Baths interior, circa 1910

The Spring Hill Baths is a two-storeyed rendered brick building with a pitched corrugated galvanised iron roof on steel trusses. It has a rendered brick parapet facade which abuts the street alignment, and a double height swimming hall containing a 23.5 metres (77 ft) long by 9.1 metres (30 ft) wide concrete pool, encircled by a timber gallery and 57 dressing boxes. A two-storeyed caretaker's residence occupies the eastern end of the building facing Torrington Street. A single-storeyed weatherboard clubroom and concrete block toilets are located along the northern edge.

Lightweight steel trusses span the full width of the swimming hall, resting on engaged brick piers. The roof has been reclad, and while the original roof fully covered the swimming hall, a large central portion of the roof is now open to the sky. The steel trusses appear to be original.

Square timber columns support the timber balustrade and gallery of tiered timber seating, creating a loggia around the perimeter of the pool. Various signs are incorporated into the timber work, such as "Ladies Only This Side" and "Gents Only This Side". A foundation stone is included in the concrete siding at the north-eastern corner of the pool.

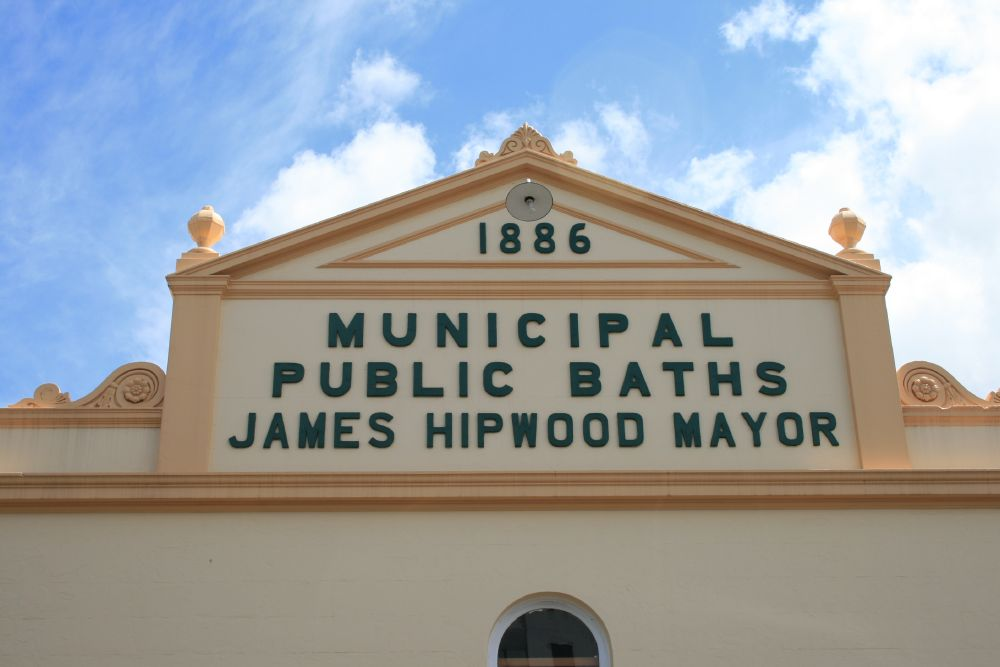
Signage, 2008

The street facade gives the building substantial presence within the domestic streetscape. It presents a balanced arrangement of arched sash windows and doorways, with a simple parapet and pediment. On the latter is displayed the date 1886 and the inscription "Municipal Public Baths" and "James Hipwood Mayor". The facade is crowned with masonry urns and plaster floral motifs. The street entrance is covered by a corrugated iron awning on timber frame and brackets.

Apart from the addition of a filtration system and toilets, the baths remain intact in form, structure and interior detail.

== Heritage listing ==
Spring Hill Baths was listed on the Queensland Heritage Register on 21 October 1992 having satisfied the following criteria.

The place is important in demonstrating the evolution or pattern of Queensland's history.

Spring Hill Baths is important in demonstrating the evolution of Queensland's history, in its innovative role in promoting public health in Brisbane, including providing a means of the daily flushing of the Spring Hollow drainage scheme.

The place demonstrates rare, uncommon or endangered aspects of Queensland's cultural heritage.

Spring Hill Baths demonstrates rare aspects of Queensland's cultural heritage, being Brisbane's first inground public baths and being a substantially intact example of late 19th century public swimming baths, complete with early changing cubicles.

The place is important in demonstrating the principal characteristics of a particular class of cultural places.

Spring Hill Baths is important in demonstrating the principal characteristics of late nineteenth century public baths.

The place is important because of its aesthetic significance.

Spring Hill Baths is important in exhibiting an aesthetic contribution to the Torrington Street streetscape and Spring Hill townscape, which is valued by the community.

The place has a strong or special association with a particular community or cultural group for social, cultural or spiritual reasons.

Spring Hill Baths has had a strong community association with Brisbane competitive swimming, swimming instruction, and local recreation since the 1880s.
