= McWhinneys Brick Cottage =

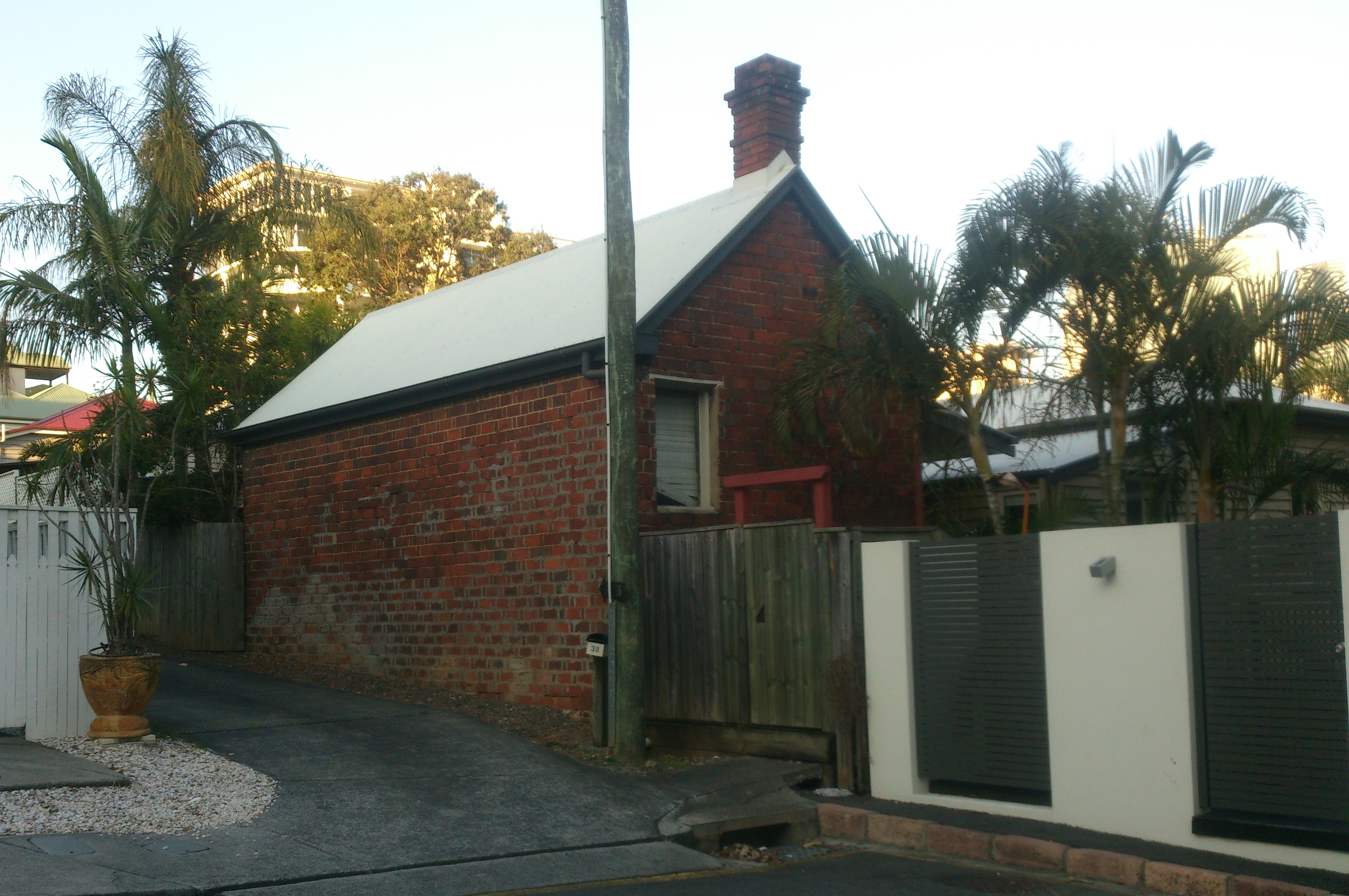
- 2015

- Location within Queensland Location within Australia
- 27.4634°S 153.0222°E
- Location: 47–55 Birley Street, Spring Hill, City of Brisbane, Queensland, Australia

History
- Design period: 1840s–1860s (mid-19th century)
- Built: 1860s
- Built for: Thomas McWhinney

Queensland Heritage Register
- Official name: McWhinneys Brick Cottage
- Type: state heritage (archaeological, built)
- Designated: 23 February 2001
- Reference no.: 602248
- Significant period: 1860s (fabric, historical); 1900 (fabric)
- Significant components: pathway/walkway, residential accommodation – main house, yard

McWhinneys Brick Cottage is a heritage-listed cottage at 47–55 Birley Street, Spring Hill, City of Brisbane, Queensland, Australia. It was built in the 1860s for Thomas McWhinney. It was added to the Queensland Heritage Register on 23 February 2001.

== History ==
The brick cottage at 59 Birley Street, Spring Hill, was likely erected in the mid-1860s for Thomas McWhinney, plasterer.

This part of Spring Hill was surveyed officially into suburban allotments in 1856, and was soon subdivided for closer residential settlement by speculative landowners. Along with Kangaroo Point and Petrie Terrace, Spring Hill was among the earliest of Brisbane's dormitory suburbs, attracting middle-class residents to the highland along the ridges, and the working class to the hollows in between: Hanly's Hollow (between Wickham Terrace and Leichhardt Street), Spring Hollow (between Leichhardt Street and Gregory Terrace), and York's Hollow (to the north of Gregory Terrace - an area occupied by a number of brick-makers in the 1850s and 1860s).

The site on which the brick cottage is located was part of a larger parcel of land (1 acre 3 roods 8 perches (0.73 ha) - suburban portion 179, parish of North Brisbane) with a frontage to Leichhardt Street, purchased from the Crown in May 1860 by Patrick Byrne of Brisbane for the sum of £216. Almost immediately Byrne subdivided this portion into 10 subdivisions around a central access road (Birley Street) off Leichhardt Street. At this period, Birley Street did not extend through to Wickham Terrace. The two subdivisions at the top of the hill, with frontages to Leichhardt Street, comprised 39 perches (990 m^{2}) each, but the remainder, running down the hill on each side of Birley Street into Hanly's Hollow, were each just under 20 perches (510 m^{2}). The first transfer was recorded in August 1861 and all but one of the subdivisions sold in the period 1861–65. By the census of September 1871, there were 12 houses in Birley Street, all inhabited, accommodating 58 persons. Many of these houses appear to have been rental properties, and attracted mostly working-class tenants such as bootmakers, carpenters, labourers, mariners, plasterers, printers, storemen and a number of widows, who were likely existing on modest incomes.

In September 1865, Patrick Byrne sold subdivision 3 of suburban portion 179 (19.4 perches (490 m^{2})) to Thomas McWhinney (sometimes McWhinny or McWhinnie) of Brisbane, for the sum of £63. This is the site of the present brick cottage. It is not known if a house was extant on the land at the time of sale, but the price suggests not.

In April 1866 McWhinney took out a mortgage of £25 on his Birley Street property from the Queensland Building Society No.2, of which he was a member. The timing, within a year of acquiring the land, suggests that the mortgage was used to help finance the construction of the brick cottage. McWhinney was occupying the land in October 1872, when he applied to bring his property under the provisions of the Real Property Act of 1861, and is listed in the 1874 Post Office Directory as resident in Birley Street.

McWhinney and his wife Isabella Todd and family had arrived in New South Wales by 1858, and moved to Brisbane in the early 1860s, where Thomas, who was a plasterer by trade, gained employment with James Campbell. He worked for Campbell for 26 years until his retirement c. 1888, for most of that time as a foreman, supervising the plastering and designing the mouldings for most of the principal construction work undertaken by Campbell during that period.

The cottage at 59 Birley Street is constructed in Flemish bond brick-on-edge ('rat-trap' bond), a form of construction used in other Spring Hill buildings of the 1860s and 1870s (such as Moody's Cottages in Rogers Street). It was a faster and cheaper form of construction, usually restricted to working-class homes and small workshops and stores. At 59 Birley Street the exterior brickwork was finished with tuckpointing and the internal fireplace was plastered, which may be explained by the connection with McWhinney.

By 1883 the McWhinneys had left Birley Street and moved to Arthur Street in Fortitude Valley by 1885, but McWhinney retained his Birley Street land, likely renting out the brick cottage. In 1885, McWhinney also gained title the adjacent subdivision 6 on the northern side of his Birley Street allotment. In the 1880s there were only four or five houses along this side of Birley Street (which did not extend past Lilley Street at that stage), and it is possible (but not confirmed) that in the late 1880s, 59 Birley Street was known as Jireh Cottage, occupied by compositor Thomas Wright. In May 1894, title to subdivisions 3 and 6 was transferred to Mary Ann McWhinney of Brisbane, spinster, and in August 1896 Thomas McWhinney, aged nearly 77, died.

In the mid-1890s Birley Street was extended through to Wickham Terrace and in May 1900 subdivisions 3 and 6 of suburban portion 179 were transferred from Mary Ann McWhinney to Richard Gailey, the well-known Brisbane architect, who appears to have developed these two blocks with the construction of four timber houses for rental purposes. The existing houses on this land, one of which is now connected via an enclosed verandah to the front of the brick cottage at 59 Birley Street, appear to date from this period.

By 1913, 59 Birley Street was occupied by Mrs Jane Collins. A Brisbane City Council Water Supply and Sewerage Detail Plan dated 1914 indicates a structure at 59 Birley Street which correlates with the present c. 1900 timber house attached to the brick cottage at the rear.

In June 1916, title to subdivisions 3 and 6 of suburban portion 179 was transferred from Richard Gailey to his daughter, Evadne Jane Gailey of Brisbane. The houses on these blocks remained rental properties, 59 Birley Street attracting mainly widows. In 1952 both subdivisions passed to Alfred Roberts, and following his death in 1979, they were sold in 1983 to the Queensland Master Builders Association (Union of Employers), who have retained them since as rental properties.

== Description ==
59 Birley Street is located on the western side of Birley Street, about two-thirds of the way down toward the hollow which runs between Leichhardt Street and Wickham Terrace (Hanly's Hollow).

It contains two principal structures: a c. 1900 high-set timber residence at the front of the block, attached via an enclosed c. 1900 timber verandah to a c. 1860s brick cottage at the rear.

The c. 1860s cottage is a small, rectangular, two-roomed brick structure with gable roof and close eaves. It rests on stone (porphyry or Brisbane tuff) foundations, low at the back and approximately 90 centimetres (35 in) above ground at the front, where the land slopes. The stone blocks are roughly dressed and laid in courses, the more regular blocks placed along the exposed southern side. The roof is clad with corrugated iron, with the original shingle battens surviving beneath this.

The red face brick is laid in Flemish bond but brick-on-edge ('rat- trap' bond) - a faster and cheaper method of construction often used for working-class construction in Brisbane in the 1860s and 1870s. There are remnants of white tuckpointing on the bricks closest to the eaves, but the lower sections of the western and southern external walls have been badly repaired with later cement grouting. The northern external wall has been clad with a recent "pebble-dash" render. The front (eastern) wall has been painted and with the enclosing of the front verandah, is no longer exposed to the elements. It has two window openings symmetrically positioned either side of a central doorway. The western wall, built almost on the boundary of the allotment, has no fenestration. A chimney top, nicely detailed with decorative brickwork, rises above the roof at the southern end, but the main shaft of the chimney is internal.

The interior of the cottage comprises two small rooms. The former front entrance (the door has been removed) opens from a now enclosed timber verandah into the southern room, which is larger than the northern room and contains a fireplace and chimney. It is likely this room functioned as kitchen, living room and dining room. There are two windows to this room - one opening onto the front (eastern) verandah and retaining its original double-hung sash window, and the other a later opening in the southern wall beside the fireplace. The northern room is accessed from the southern room and has no external access. It originally had two windows, one in the north wall and the other in the eastern wall opening onto the verandah. The original sash window in the north wall has been replaced with louvres, and the window in the eastern wall has been in-filled with fibrous cement sheeting.

Both rooms retain their early skirting boards and the interior of the cottage is lined with plaster - walls, ceilings, partitioning wall and chimney. Much of this is early lathe and plaster work and early cement render, but sections of the ceilings have been replaced with recent plasterboard sheeting.

The floor boards are of pine, some of this early and secured with hand-made nails. The floor in the northern room has been replaced.

The front verandah was likely replaced c. 1900 with the construction of the attached timber house, and is now enclosed. The northern section of this verandah has been partitioned and enclosed as a bathroom. The southern section is now an internal passageway with an external door at the southern end. This verandah links the brick cottage to the timber house.

The c. 1900 house is a high-set, timber-framed, weatherboard clad structure with a corrugated iron hipped and gabled roof. It has a front extended gable and small front verandah which has since been enclosed.

In plan, the timber house has a central corridor opening off the enclosed front verandah. On the northern side of the corridor are three rooms. On the southern side there are two. The room at the rear on the southern side appears to have been partitioned to create a corridor through to the back door which opens onto the enclosed front verandah of the brick cottage. Floorboards throughout are the original, likely pine. Rooms throughout are lined with vertically-jointed tongue and groove boards and the ceilings are also tongue and groove. The house retains its original joinery, including doors and window frames, some of which are sash and some casements. All the internal doors have fanlights above. The place is remarkably intact considering that it has been occupied as a rental property for approximately a century.

A yard adjoining the cottage on the southern side contains a number of archaeological deposits—horse shoes, bottles, coins, broken pottery, shells and handmade nails have been found here—and there is sub-strata evidence of an early brick pathway to the cottage.

== Heritage listing ==
McWhinneys Brick Cottage was listed on the Queensland Heritage Register on 23 February 2001 having satisfied the following criteria.

The place is important in demonstrating the evolution or pattern of Queensland's history.

McWhinney's Brick Cottage at 59 Birley Street, Spring Hill, erected probably in the mid-1860s, has high historical significance and is important in illustrating the pattern of Queensland's history. It is associated with the mid-19th century settlement of Spring Hill as one of Brisbane's earliest dormitory suburbs, and illustrates the nature of residential subdivisions and construction in Brisbane at this period - particularly the use of brick and stone as distinct from timber.

The place demonstrates rare, uncommon or endangered aspects of Queensland's cultural heritage.

The brick cottage is a rare surviving example of its type and age in Brisbane, and is particularly significant for its brick-on-edge construction, for the intactness of many of the finishes, and for what it reveals of mid-19th century working-class living conditions.

The place has potential to yield information that will contribute to an understanding of Queensland's history.

Archaeological deposits in the grounds have the potential to reveal information since its non-indigenous occupation in the 1860s.

The place is important in demonstrating the principal characteristics of a particular class of cultural places.

The brick cottage is a rare surviving example of its type and age in Brisbane, and is particularly significant for its brick-on-edge construction, for the intactness of many of the finishes, and for what it reveals of mid-19th century working-class living conditions.

The place is important because of its aesthetic significance.

The place has aesthetic value engendered by the materials, form, scale and setting of the brick cottage.
