= Fortitude Valley State School =

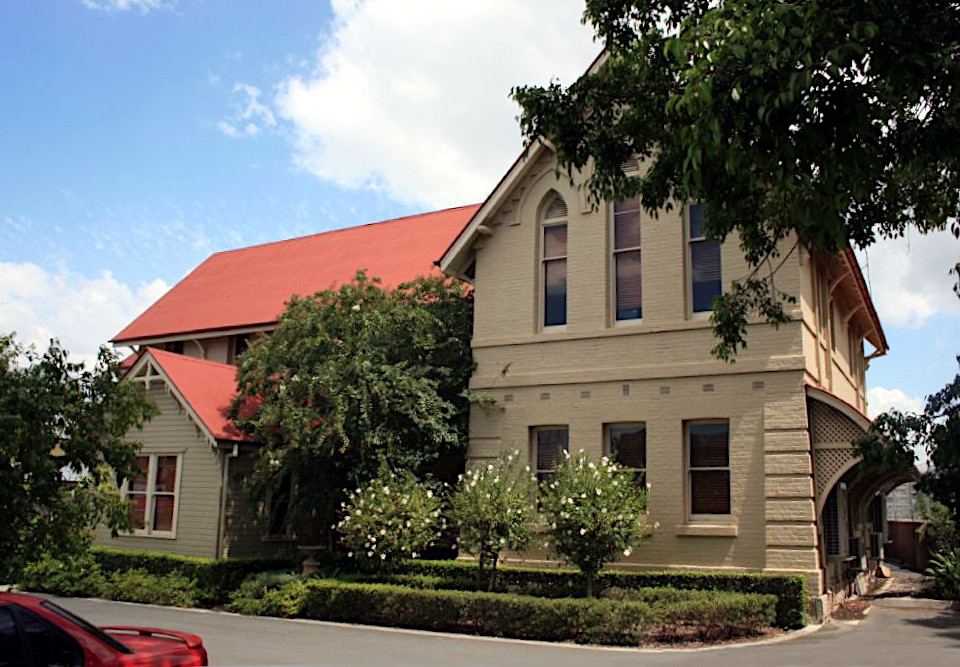
- Fortitude Valley State School, 2009

- Location within Queensland Location within Australia
- 27.4532°S 153.0367°E
- Location: 95 Brookes Street, Fortitude Valley, City of Brisbane, Queensland, Australia

History
- Design period: 1840s–1860s (mid-19th century)
- Built: 1867–1913

Site notes
- Architect: Benjamin Backhouse

Queensland Heritage Register
- Official name: Fortitude Valley State School (former), State Emergency Services State Headquarters, former Fortitude Valley Boys School and former Fortitude Valley Girls and Infants School
- Type: state heritage (built)
- Designated: 26 March 1999
- Reference no.: 602136
- Significant period: 1860s–1870s (historical); 1860s–1910s (fabric)
- Significant components: infants' school, school/school room

Fortitude Valley State School is a heritage-listed former state school at 95 Brookes Street, Fortitude Valley, City of Brisbane, Queensland, Australia. It was designed by Benjamin Backhouse and built from 1867 to 1913. It is also known as State Emergency Services State Headquarters and former Fortitude Valley Boys School and former Fortitude Valley Girls and Infants School. It was added to the Queensland Heritage Register on 26 March 1999.

== History ==
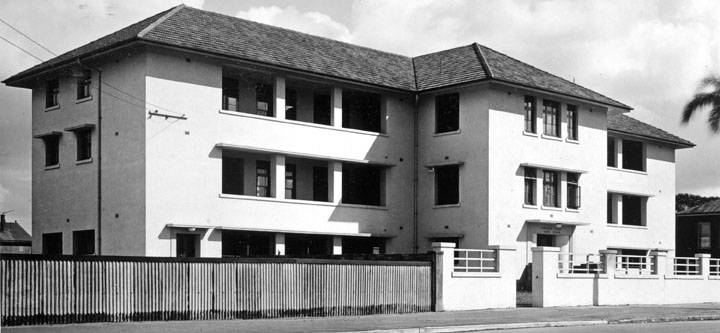
New school building, Fortitude Valley, July 1950

Two substantial brick buildings form the former Fortitude Valley State School in Brookes Street, Fortitude Valley. The two-storeyed brick building designed by Benjamin Backhouse in 1867 was the former Girls and Infants School. The adjacent single-storey designed by Richard George Suter in 1874 was the former Boys School.

Fortitude Valley was settled throughout the 1850s, with a boost to immigrants with the arrival of John Dunmore Lang's free settlers on the ship Fortitude. Denied promised land grants this group moved from York's Hollow, near Wickham Terrace, to what became known as Fortitude Valley. A government census in 1861 showed that there was a total population of over 1300 people in the district by that year.

The Fortitude Valley State School opened in rented premises on 4 March 1861 in the Foresters' Hall, Ann Street near Brunswick Street diagonally opposite the Royal George (RG) Hotel with an average attendance of 140 boys. A girls school joined the boys in 1864. As attendance continued to rise in this flourishing village, the need for a more permanent educational facility ensued. The site in Brookes Street was selected, and the students took up residence in the 1867 two-storeyed building designed by Benjamin Backhouse. As enrolments continued to grow the need to provide additional facilities saw a second building designed by Richard Suter constructed in 1874. The Girls and Infants school were located in the original building and the Boys occupied the new building. The schools were considered separate entities.

Both Backhouse and Suter's designs were modelled on the Lancastrian system. This system combined galleried schoolrooms and smaller classrooms for use in conjunction with monitors and pupil teachers. Monitors and pupil teachers used the classrooms for drill learning with small groups while the teacher conducted the main class in the schoolroom. The arrangement of the rooms allowed the school to cope with very large numbers of children in ratio to small numbers of teachers. The 1867 Fortitude Valley School was designed to accommodate 300 children.

Benjamin Backhouse was born in Ipswich, England and migrated to Queensland in 1861 after a sojourn to the Victorian goldfields between 1852 and 1860. During his eight years in Brisbane he was to erect more than 100 buildings, drawing from a wide range of public, commercial and private clients. He was architect to the Board of General Education between 1863 and 1868. He designed brick schools for Warwick (Warwick East State School 1864), Maryborough (1866), and Bowen (1866). He supervised the construction of South Brisbane State School (1864) and extended the Brisbane Normal School. He also designed a number of timber schools in the southern part of Queensland before moving south to Sydney in 1869.

Richard George Suter was born in London and migrated in 1853. By 1865, Suter was working with Backhouse whilst establishing his own practice. After Backhouse left Queensland in 1868, Suter was offered independent commissions from the Queensland Board of Education. Suter was to develop the use of exposed external studding on timber buildings which was particularly popular in school building constrained by cost and availability of materials.

The school closed in December 2013 due to low student numbers, despite a prolonged campaign by parents and students to keep it open. The Queensland Government argued that there was another school only 1.5 kilometres (0.93 mi) away that could accommodate the students. The site of the school was transferred to Fortitude Valley State Secondary College, which opened in 2020.

== Description ==
Two distinctive and substantial brick buildings on the south side of Brookes Street, Fortitude Valley, between the Fortitude Valley Police Station and the railway line, were the core buildings of the former Fortitude Valley State School. Their decoration and construction details are reminiscent of the Gothic Revival style favoured for ecclesiastical and educational buildings of the time. Within this idiom, these buildings give expression to a more restrained Gothic, displaying a sense of mass solidity and simplicity. Both are lively compositions with decorative textured surfaces and discrete detailing.

=== Former Girls and Infants School (Benjamin Backhouse 1867) ===
This free-standing two-storey red face brick building sits on a rusticated Brisbane tuff base. The exterior is now painted. Though asymmetrical, the school is designed to a basilica-like plan with the narthex and nave expressed externally by steeply pitched intersecting gable roofs. The main entrance is from a five-sided apse porch to the east. To the north, a timber single-storey room with gable roof and decorative paired brackets projects from the middle of the nave. The passage between this room and the main building is now enclosed. The verandah to the south is now enclosed and a single storey brick extension has been constructed to the southeast corner off the apse porch and south verandah.

The building has battered, banded corners and two horizontal stringcourses to the upper level. The north and south gable fronts have three lancet windows to the upper level each with a plain head-mould. Beneath the eaves, both gable fronts are decorated with crow gable corbelling and three blank bullseye windows. A vertical rectangular louvred vent to the east gable sits above the apse porch. The eaves are supported by plain corbelled brackets and the underside is lined with tongue and groove boards. The words "primary school" are spelt out in projecting brick on the north side of the nave at the upper floor level. Curved sunhoods with bold brackets and lattice spandrel screens shelter the windows of the ground floor to the west and southwest.

The entry and circulation apse opens into a large school room from which two smaller teaching rooms open to the west. The ground and first floor plans are identical. These rooms are now partitioned into office workspaces and meeting rooms. The interiors are plain with stop-chamfering to doors and window frames. The apse stair has stop- chamfered newell posts with ball and half-ball tops and plain rectangular timber post balustrading. Much of the joinery survives. The ceiling to roof of the large school room at the upper level is presently covered by a suspended ceiling of acoustic tiles, but a preliminary investigation reveals that the roof is supported by four collar-braced king-post trusses within a lofty timber lined roof space. The arched pendant posts with decorative corbels survive and are visible beneath the suspended ceiling. A dog-leg stair with half landing has been inserted from the south-west teaching room to the teaching room directly above. In the large school rooms, high set windows to the south and larger lower windows to the north accommodated galleried classes. High set windows to the south and west of the small teaching rooms also accommodated galleried classes. The south verandah is enclosed with weatherboards and louvres and partitioned into toilets. A timber louvre to the former southwest lavatory on the south verandah survives. There are hat/coat hooks along the masonry wall to the verandah. The pavilion extension to the south of the apse is entered from the south verandah. A light and airy room, with a mansard profile sheeted and battened ceiling, it is lit by a bank of south facing windows.

=== Former Boys School (Richard Suter 1874) ===
This axially-planned, symmetrical one-storey brick building is east of the former Girls and Infants School and also conforms to a basilica-like plan. Separate, steeply pitched gabled roofs express the narthex and nave and the main entrance is from a five-sided apse porch to the north. The building sits on stone foundations and the verandahs to the east and west rest on low brick piers. The verandahs have been enclosed. The beehive-like corbelling to the eaves of the nave and north gable front is more elaborate than the corbelling on the Girls and Infants School.

The apse entry, with a narrow tongue and groove board lined ceiling, opens into the high ceilinged large school room from which two small teaching rooms open to the south. The large school room has been subdivided into two spaces by a vertical tongue and groove lined post and rail framed partition. Both partitioned spaces have a tongue and groove lined ceiling with a plain cornice. There are timber floors throughout. Cambered arched window openings are a feature throughout the building and double arched doors open from the large school room to both verandahs. Windows to the south portion of the large school room are sheeted over and could not be inspected. Windows to the west wall of the north portion have been clumsily replaced but a window to the north east survives. The two small teaching rooms are lit from the south by a bank of casement windows and each opens to its adjacent verandah. The flat sheeted and battened ceiling across these rooms falls with the gable roof slope near the edges of the rooms. Throughout the building door mouldings, window frames, verandah posts and verandah rails are stop-chamfered. Many verandah posts survive within the enclosing boarding, some with capitals intact. There is evidence that there were handrails and balustrading to the verandahs.

=== Grounds ===
The former Opportunity School, a number of sheds, masts and a lookout are scattered to the south of the site.

Bitumen paths have been laid throughout the site. A bitumen carpark and a gravel parking lot lie to the north of the site. There is haphazard planting along the Brookes Street boundary and close to the buildings.

These incidental buildings and plantings are not considered to be of cultural heritage significance.

=== Replacement ===
In 2019, the Fortitude Valley State Secondary College opened on the site. The main building of the previous Fortuitude Valley State School was transformed into the music block for the new school, and the oval was used as space to build the first of two, six-story tall vertical buildings, with construction completed halfway through 2019.

== Heritage listing ==
Fortitude Valley State School was listed on the Queensland Heritage Register on 26 March 1999 having satisfied the following criteria.

The place is important in demonstrating the evolution or pattern of Queensland's history.

Two distinctive and substantial brick buildings on the south side of Brookes Street, Fortitude Valley, between the Fortitude Valley Police Station and the railway line were the core buildings of the Fortitude Valley State School. The two buildings are early examples of Queensland public school buildings, demonstrating the evolution of settlement in Brisbane.

The 1913 extension to the former Girls' and Infants' School and the dividing partition of the former Boys School are important for demonstrating architectural responses to changes in educational theory. Other alterations indicate architectural responses to the evolution of the operational activities of the Fortitude Valley State School.

The place demonstrates rare, uncommon or endangered aspects of Queensland's cultural heritage.

They are rare examples of the Gothic Revival style favoured for ecclesiastical and educational buildings in the nineteenth century. The two buildings are important for their intact interiors including; roof trusses, timber lined ceilings, joinery, and apse stair. The design allowed for large schoolrooms combined with small classrooms that accommodated galleried seating, features essential to the nineteenth century Lancastrian teaching system. They are rare surviving Queensland examples of schools designed to accommodate this system of education.

The place is important because of its aesthetic significance.

The two buildings contribute to the Brookes Street streetscape aesthetic, which includes the Holy Trinity Church and Rectory, the Fortitude Valley Police Station and the 1948 Fortitude Valley State School.

The place has a special association with the life or work of a particular person, group or organisation of importance in Queensland's history.

The 1867 two-storeyed former Girls' and Infants' School designed by important Queensland architect Benjamin Backhouse, and the 1874 single-storeyed former Boys' School designed by another important Queensland architect Richard George Suter are outstanding examples of their educational work.
