= Spring Hill, Queensland =

Spring Hill
- Suburb
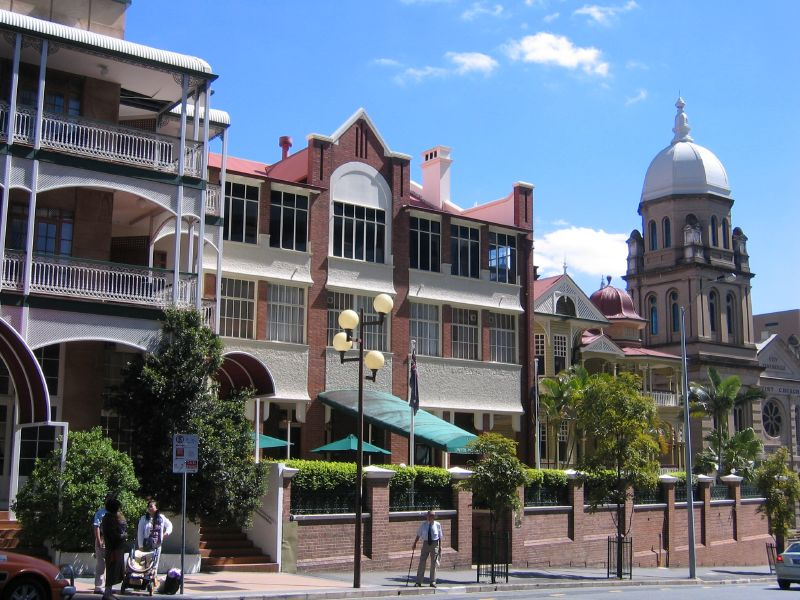
- Wickham Terrace, the main street of Spring Hill

- Interactive map of Spring Hill
- Coordinates: 27.4594°S 153.0261°E
- Country: Australia
- State: Queensland
- City: Brisbane
- LGA: City of Brisbane (Central Ward)
- Location: 1.1 km (0.68 mi) N of Brisbane CBD
- Established: 1840s

Government
  - State electorate: McConnel
  - Federal division: Brisbane

Area
  - Total: 1.3 km^{2} (0.50 sq mi)

Population
  - Total: 6,593 (2021 census)
  - Density: 5,070/km^{2} (13,100/sq mi)
- Time zone: UTC+10:00 (AEST)
- Postcode: 4000
Suburbs around Spring Hill
Kelvin Grove	Herston	Bowen Hills
Petrie Terrace	Spring Hill	Fortitude Valley
Brisbane City	Brisbane City	Brisbane City

Spring Hill is an inner northern suburb in the City of Brisbane, Queensland, Australia. It is one of Brisbane's earliest suburbs. In the 2021 census, Spring Hill had a population of 6,593 people.

== Geography ==
Spring Hill is located 2 kilometres (1.2 mi) north of the central business district. Parts of Spring Hill can be considered to be extensions of the Brisbane CBD.

The Northern Busway serves the suburb via the Normanby bus stop.

== History ==
Spring Hill was originally called Spring Hollow because natural springs in the area supplemented Brisbane's early water supply from the Tank Stream and its dam. The name Spring Hill came into use when prominent citizens began living on the ridge. Boundary Street in Spring Hill and also in West End were named due to the policy of preventing the Jagera and Turrbal peoples from being within the boundaries of the British settlement at night.

All Saints' Anglican Church was opened in 1862. In 1869 it was rebuilt and dedicated. It was consecrated in 1885.

Spring Hill is one of the oldest residential neighbourhoods in Brisbane, with many houses dating from the nineteenth century. As an example, some of the house lots in Sedgebrook Street were surveyed in the 1870s. However, in recent decades much of the older residential and commercial structures have been demolished to be replaced by modern office blocks and apartment buildings.

A Primitive Methodist Church opened at 48 Leichhardt Street on Sunday 12 July 1874, when it was described as "situated on the highest and most pleasant point of Spring Hill ... a handsome and substantially-built brick edifice, about 51 feet long and 34 feet wide ... capable of comfortably accommodating 200 persons". It was designed by architect Richard Gailey. Having been used as a place of worship for over 100 years, the Methodist Church offered the church building for sale in February 1977, although it was not sold until 30 March 1978, after which it has had a number of commercial occupants. The church building was listed on the Brisbane Heritage Register on 1 January 2004. It is the earliest surviving church in Spring Hill.

On Sunday 3 December 1876, a Baptist Church was opened in Fortescue Street. In February 1889, services ceased at the church building in preparation for its relocation to Nundah., where it reopened as the Nundah Baptist Church on Sunday 9 June 1889. In 1890, the Baptist City Taberacle opened at 163 Wickham Terrace in Spring Hill.

A government laboratory and animal facility was built in the 1890s adjacent to the Brisbane Grammar School on College Road. It was known as the Bacteriological Institute from 1900 to 1910.

Between 1903 and 1947, trams ran up Edward Street and along Leichhardt Street to Gregory Terrace. This tram line, operated by the Brisbane City Council, was the steepest in Australia, with a maximum gradient of 1 in 8. After its closure in1947, the trams were initially replaced with diesel buses, but in 1951 these were replaced by a trolley-bus service. This was in turn replaced by diesel buses in 1968. The suburb was also served by trams along Boundary street and St Pauls Terrace, with this service being replaced by buses in 1969.

On 22 September 1976, a mass shooting and hostage crisis occurred on Boundary Street when 36-year-old William Robert Wilson killed two people and wounded four others at random before taking five hostages. He surrendered to police after an hours-long standoff and was sentenced to life imprisonment in 1980.

== Demographics ==
Historical population
Year	Pop.	±%
2001	5,206	—
2006	4,835	−7.1%
2011	5,259	+8.8%
2016	5,974	+13.6%
2021	6,593	+10.4%

In the 2011 census, Spring Hill had a population of 5,259 people, 44% female and 56% male. The median age of the Spring Hill population was 30 years, 7 years below the Australian median. Children aged under 15 years made up 6.8% of the population and people aged 65 years and over made up 5.6% of the population. The most notable difference was the group in their twenties; in Spring Hill this group made up 36.1% of the population, compared to just 13.8% nationally. 43.8% of people living in Spring Hill were born in Australia, compared to the national average of 69.8%; the next most common countries of birth were Korea, Republic of 3.9%, India 3.8%, New Zealand 3.6%, England 3.5%, Colombia 2.1%. 56.7% of people spoke only English at home; the next most popular languages were 3.3% Korean, 3.3% Mandarin, 3.3% Spanish, 1.7% Portuguese, 1.7% Cantonese. The most common religious affiliation was "No Religion" (28.5%); the next most common responses were Catholic 22.9%, Anglican 8.4%, Hinduism 3.7% and Buddhism 3.1%.

In the 2016 census, Spring Hill had a population of 5,974 people.

In the 2021 census, Spring Hill had a population of 6,593 people.

== Heritage listings ==
Spring Hill has a number of heritage-listed sites, including:

- McWhinneys Brick Cottage, 47–55 Birley Street
- Lonsdale House, 283 Boundary Street
- Main Roads Building, 477 Boundary Street
- William Grigor's House, 19 Gloucester Street
- Cliveden Mansions, 17 Gregory Terrace
- Brisbane Grammar School Buildings, 24 Gregory Terrace
- Victoria Flats, 369 Gregory Terrace
- Centenary Pool Complex, 400 Gregory Terrace
- Grangehill, 449 & 451 Gregory Terrace
- Victoria Park, 454 Gregory Terrace
- Mountview House, 37 Leichhardt Street
- Bedford Playground, 8 Love Street
- Brisbane Central State School, Rogers Street
- St Pauls Presbyterian Church, 43 St Pauls Terrace
- St Pauls Presbyterian Church Hall, 43 St Pauls Terrace
- Bellmount, 71 St Pauls Terrace
- Monier Ventilation Shaft 2, 134 St Paul's Terrace
- Spring Hill Baths, 14 Torrington Street
- Moody's Cottages, 8–12, & 16 Victoria Street:
- Wickham Terrace: Albert Park (North) air raid shelter
- All Saints Anglican Church, 32 Wickham Terrace
- Inchcolm, 73 Wickham Terrace
- Lister House, 79 Wickham Terrace
- Espie Dods House, 97 Wickham Terrace
- Ballow Chambers, 121 Wickham Terrace
- Wickham Terrace Car Park, 136 Wickham Terrace
- Wickham House, 155–157 Wickham Terrace
- Baptist City Tabernacle, 163 Wickham Terrace
- United Service Club Premises, 183 Wickham Terrace
- Craigston, 217 Wickham Terrace
- The Old Windmill, 226 Wickham Terrace
- Spring Hill Reservoirs, 230 Wickham Terrace
- Bryntirion, 287 Wickham Terrace
- Athol Place, 307 Wickham Terrace
- Wickham Park Air Raid Shelters, 330 Wickham Terrace
- Theosophical Society Building, 355 Wickham Terrace
- St Andrews War Memorial Hospital Administration Building, 465 Wickham Terrace
- Lady Bowen Hospital, 497–535 Wickham Terrace
- Monier Ventilation Shaft 1, 500 Wickham Terrace

== Attractions ==
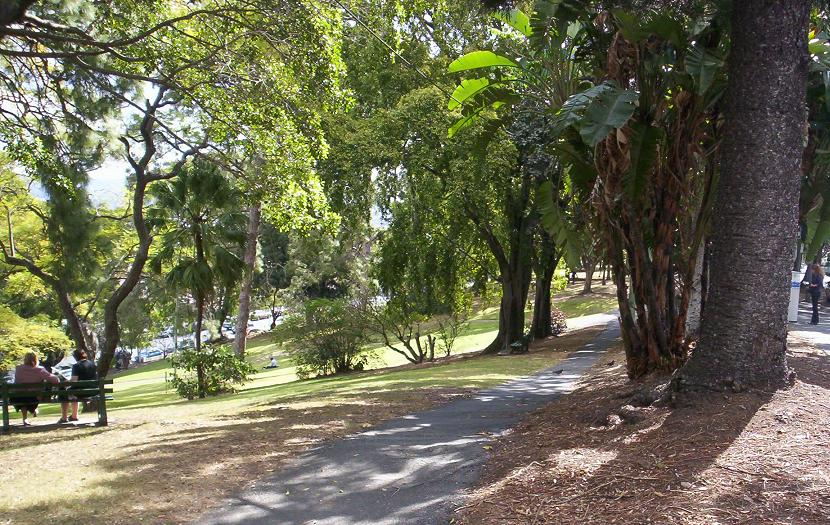
Wickham Park

The Old Windmill in Wickham Park was built in 1828 when Brisbane was a penal colony and originally milled grain and then used as a gallows for the colony. The Spring Hill Baths operated by the Brisbane City Council are the oldest public baths in Queensland.

== Education ==
Brisbane Central State School is a government primary (Prep–6) school for boys and girls at Rogers Street (27.4592°S 153.0271°E). In 2018, the school had an enrolment of 347 students with 26 teachers (22 full-time equivalent) and 20 non-teaching staff (11 full-time equivalent).

Brisbane Grammar School is a private primary and secondary (5–12) school for boys at 24 Gregory Terrace (27.4598°S 153.0186°E). In 2018, the school had an enrolment of 1,708 students with 154 teachers (146 full-time equivalent) and 107 non-teaching staff (95 full-time equivalent).

Brisbane Girls Grammar School is a private primary and secondary (5–12) school at Gregory Terrace (27.4590°S 153.0198°E). In 2018, the school had an enrolment of 1,367 students with 156 teachers (143.2 full-time equivalent) and 71 non-teaching staff (64.6 full-time equivalent).

St Joseph's College is a Catholic primary and secondary (5–12) school for boys at 285 Gregory Terrace (27.4568°S 153.0247°E) with its second campus at 40 Quarry Street (27.4575°S 153.0272°E). In 2018, the school had an enrolment of 1,629 students with 154 teachers (125 full-time equivalent) and 83 non-teaching staff (75 full-time equivalent).

St James College is a Catholic secondary (7–12) school for boys and girls at 201 Boundary Street (27.4615°S 153.0299°E). In 2018, the school had an enrolment of 411 students with 44 teachers (38 full-time equivalent) and 42 non-teaching staff (33 full-time equivalent).

Arethusa College has a campus at 25 Quarry Street (27.4580°S 153.0282°E). It is a private secondary (7–12) school with its main campus at Deception Bay.

There are no government secondary schools in Spring Hill. The nearest government secondary school is Fortitude Valley State Secondary College in neighbouring Fortitude Valley to the east.

== Amenities ==
The Brisbane City Night branch of the Queensland Country Women's Association meets at the International Hotel at 525 Boundary Street.

All Saints Anglican Church is at 32 Wickham Terrace (corner of Ann Street, 27.4645°S 153.0280°E).

The Tongan Valley congregation meets at the Salvation Army Building at 97 School Road (27.4603°S 153.0302°E). It is part of the Wesleyan Methodist Church.

The suburb is home to an established gay bar called The Sportsman Hotel that has been operating for more than 30 years.

== See also ==
- List of Brisbane suburbs
