= Bellmount, Spring Hill =

Bellmount
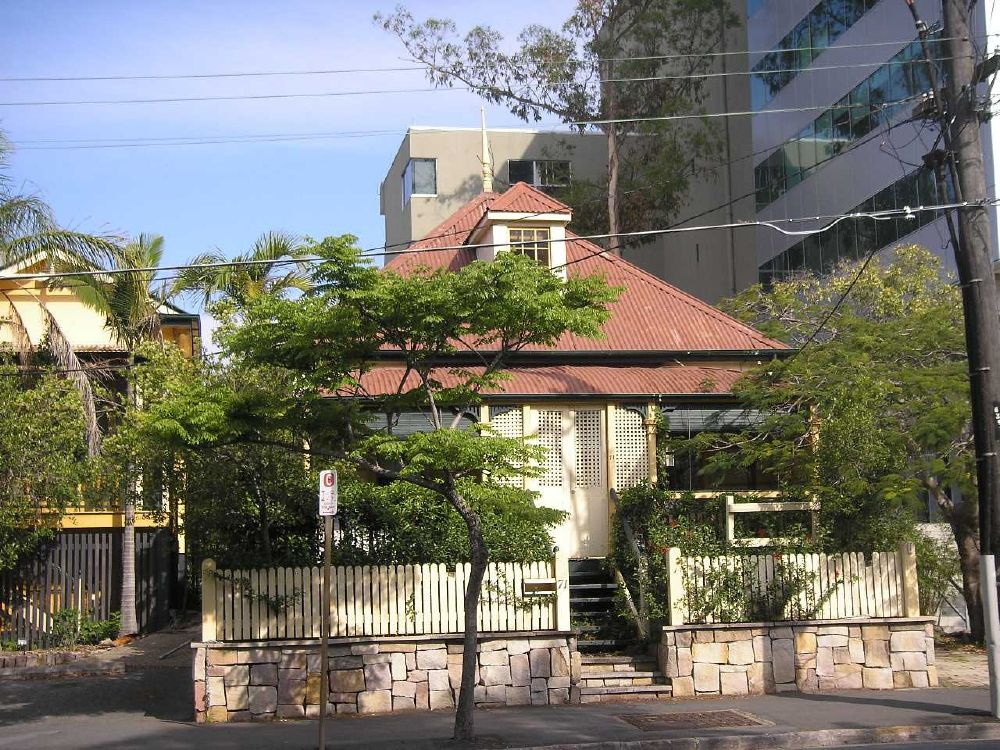
- Bellmount, 2007

- Location within Queensland Location within Australia
- 27.4601°S 153.0279°E
- Location: 71 St Pauls Terrace, Spring Hill, City of Brisbane, Queensland, Australia

History
- Design period: 1870s–1890s (late 19th century)
- Built: c. 1880–c. 1900

Queensland Heritage Register
- Official name: Bellmount
- Type: state heritage (built)
- Designated: 21 October 1992
- Reference no.: 600311
- Significant period: 1880s–1900s (fabric); 1870s/1880s (historical)
- Significant components: residential accommodation – main house

Bellmount is a heritage-listed detached house at 71 St Pauls Terrace, Spring Hill, City of Brisbane, Queensland, Australia. It was built from c. 1880 to c. 1900. It was added to the Queensland Heritage Register on 21 October 1992.

== History ==
Bellmount is a small timber cottage constructed in 1880 for Martin McLeod, a bank messenger for the Union Bank of Australia.

Spring Hill first developed in the 1850s and 1860s following the subdivision of crown land north of the town centre. Unlike other suburbs, Spring Hill evolved almost entirely into a residential suburb that had very little commercial or industrial base. Social segregation between the rich and the poor arose immediately in the area due to the undulating topography of the land. The elite built superior residences along the ridges of Wickham and Gregory Terraces, taking advantage of the views, breezes and good natural drainage. In comparison, the poor built simple timber houses on small blocks of land in the hollows adjacent to the ridges. St Pauls Terrace (formerly known as Leichhardt Street), was a lesser ridge road that was taken up by various institutions such as churches and schools. The 1880s boom period saw the development of more elite residences and boarding houses in the Spring Hill area. Amongst the working-class people, pyramid-roofed type dwellings such as Bellmount became particularly popular and continued to dominate less prestigious domestic building until the 1890s.

Deed of Grant for a 2-acre allotment along Leichhardt Street was granted to David McConnel as early as 1853. The land was subdivided into several allotments in 1872 of which a 30 perches (760 m^{2}) allotment was purchased by William Cookslerf. Further subdivision of that allotment resulted in three similar parcels of land, one of which was bought by Martin McLeod in 1880. On the site, now known as 71 St Pauls Terrace, McLeod erected a typical four roomed timber worker's cottage with a pyramid type roof. The cottage was later extended by the addition of two more rooms at the rear. Physical detailing of the attic within the main pyramid roof structure suggests that it may also have been added later.

The property remained with the McLeod family for three generations until 1976. The building is currently used as offices.

== Description ==
Bellmount is located on the southern side of St Pauls Terrace, opposite Brisbane Central State School, and amongst a small group of timber houses. The dwelling is essentially a typical four-roomed pyramid roofed cottage that has been extended at the rear. The building occupies almost the full width of the property and is set close to the street boundary. Due to the slope of the site, the house is elevated on timber stumps at the front but set close to the ground at the rear. The apex of the steeply pitched corrugated iron roof is decorated with a timber finial and a single dormer style window projects from the roof towards the street. A skylight has been fitted to the rear slope of the main roof. Half-round guttering, fixed by metal brackets, has been used for the main roof. The external walls of the original house are sheathed in twelve inch chamferboards and most of the original four-paned sash windows remain substantially intact. The extension at the rear of the building is clad in weatherboards and has multi-paned sash windows, which match the dormer window. The front verandah of the house also has a hipped roof that has a convex profile. The verandah has timber posts, brackets and top rails and cast iron balustrading. A pair of latticed screen doors provides access to the verandah and an early louvred infill panel exists at the verandah's southern end. In comparison to the front, the rear verandah is crudely constructed and has been infilled with a variety of claddings such as corrugated iron, lattice and fibreglass sheeting. The floor of the back verandah is brick paved.

The building's original core is square and comprises two bedrooms on the north side, with a combined former parlour and drawing room on the other side. Two later built rooms at the rear provide accommodation for a kitchen and an extra bedroom. The attic bedroom, which is located in the main roof space, is accessed via a narrow set of timber stairs located in the former drawing room. A bathroom has been created by the partial enclosure of the back verandah. The internal walls of the house are single skinned and lined with vertical timber boards which are 8 inches (200 mm) wide in the original section but narrower in the rear extension.

== Heritage listing ==
Bellmount was listed on the Queensland Heritage Register on 21 October 1992 having satisfied the following criteria.

The place is important in demonstrating the evolution or pattern of Queensland's history.

Bellmount, built in 1880, is important for demonstrating the early inner suburban development of Brisbane, particularly Spring Hill.

The place demonstrates rare, uncommon or endangered aspects of Queensland's cultural heritage.

The attic is an unusual example of space utilisation rarely adopted in Queensland due to high internal temperatures.

The place is important in demonstrating the principal characteristics of a particular class of cultural places.

The house is a substantially intact example of the typical four-roomed pyramid roofed worker's cottage that dominated domestic building during the 1880s to 1890s.

The place is important because of its aesthetic significance.

The house plays a significant role in the nineteenth century street scape of St Pauls Terrace, contributing aesthetically with its scale, form and use of materials.
