= 1976 Spring Hill shooting =

Mass shooting in Spring Hill, Queensland, Australia

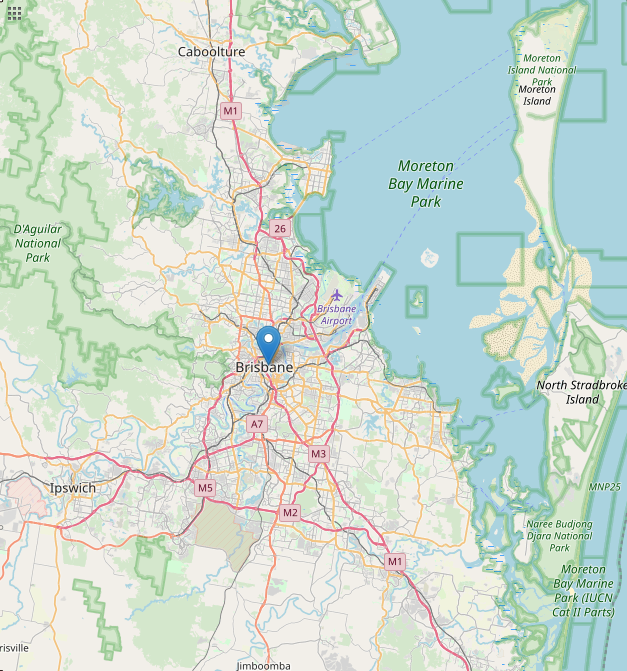
- Spring Hill (Brisbane) Spring Hill (Australia)
- Location: Boundary Street, Spring Hill, Queensland, Australia
- Date: 22 September 1976; 50 years ago 12:30 p.m. – 4:15 p.m. (AEST; UTC+10:00)
- Target: Random people
- Attack type: Mass shooting, hostage crisis, mass murder
- Weapon: .22-calibre semi-automatic rifle
- Deaths: 2
- Injuries: 4
- Perpetrator: William Robert Wilson

On 22 September 1976, a mass shooting and hostage crisis occurred on Boundary Street in Spring Hill, a suburb of Brisbane, Queensland, Australia. 36-year-old William Robert Wilson killed two people and wounded four others at random before taking five hostages. He surrendered to police after an hours-long standoff and was sentenced to life imprisonment in 1980.

== Shooting ==
At 12:30 p.m. (UTC+10:00; AEST) on 22 September 1976, local labourer William Robert Wilson, armed with a .22-calibre rifle and 500 rounds of ammunition, began shooting at people on a car park ramp in Spring Hill. Having been diagnosed with schizophrenia, Wilson was allegedly upset because he had been rejected for membership by a model plane club. He first shot and wounded 28-year-old Donald Galloway and 25-year-old Virginia Hollidge before proceeding down the street, where he encountered 17-year-old Monica Schleuss. Wilson shot Schleuss in the head, killing her in the street. The gunman crossed Boundary Street, and opened fire into a milk bar, fatally shooting 18-year-old Marianne Kalatzis and wounding 17-year-old Mavis Saunders. Wilson walked to a neighbouring barber shop, where he fired at least four shots, wounding 48-year-old Quinto Alberto. The shooter then fled to a house in Kelvin Grove, where he forced his way inside and took five student teachers (four women and one man) hostage.

The police response to the attack was initially bungled. Training was interrupted, and a responding vehicle carrying weapons crashed in Jindalee on its way to the scene. Upon arrival, police surrounded the house where Wilson and his hostages were, with some officers donning bulletproof vests and others arming themselves with rifles and shotguns.

Law enforcement negotiated with Wilson for about two hours, attempting to persuade him to surrender. At 3:30 p.m., one hostage escaped by telling Wilson she needed to use the restroom before instead running down the stairway. Around 4:00 p.m., police decided to storm the house after Wilson threatened to kill the remaining hostages and was seen holding the gun to his victims. When constables entered the room, the gunman and police exchanged gunfire. Constable John O'Gorman managed to knock Wilson down and take him into custody at around 4:15 p.m.

== Legal proceedings ==
On 23 September, Wilson, aged 36, appeared in court, charged with two counts of murder, four counts of attempted murder, unlawfully causing fear by being armed in public, and having a rifle with intent to commit a crime. He did not enter a plea, stating that he had not spoken to a lawyer. A judge recommended that Wilson be medically examined and presented back in court on 1 October. On that date, prosecutors advised that Wilson was receiving treatment at Wolston Park Hospital. Wilson stayed in the psychiatric hospital for three years before he was found mentally fit to enter a plea. Aged 40, he pleaded guilty and was sentenced to life imprisonment on 23 June 1980.
