= St Paul's Presbyterian Church Hall, Spring Hill =

St Paul's Presbyterian Church Hall
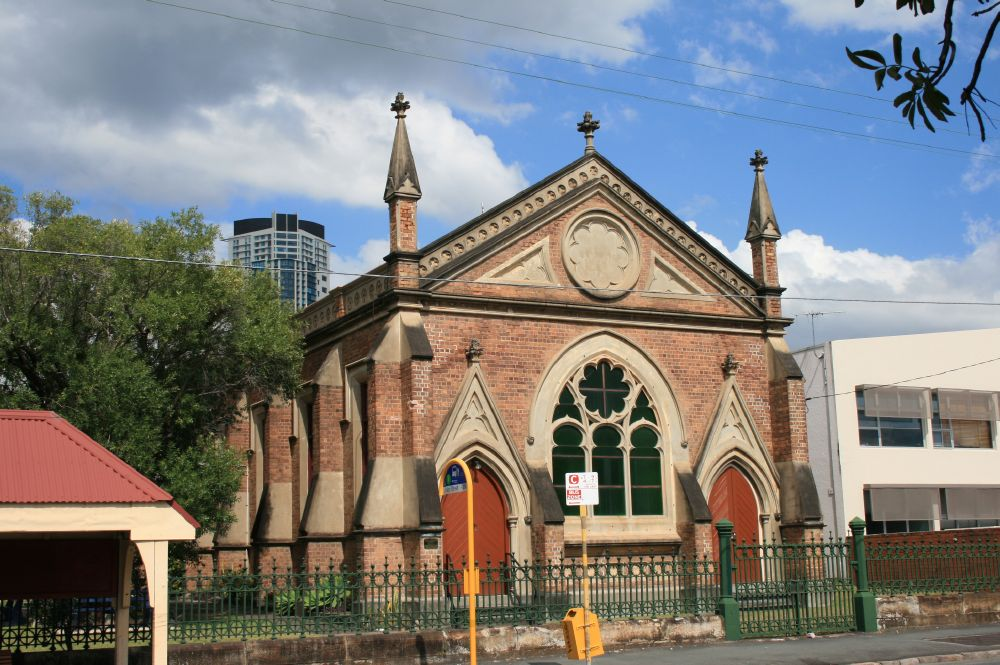
- St Paul's Presbyterian Church Hall, 2008

- Location within Queensland Location within Australia
- 27.4607°S 153.0275°E
- Location: 43 St Pauls Terrace, Spring Hill, City of Brisbane, Queensland, Australia

History
- Design period: 1870s–1890s (late 19th century)
- Built: 1886

Site notes
- Architect: Francis Drummond Greville Stanley
- Architectural style: Gothic

Queensland Heritage Register
- Official name: St Pauls Presbyterian Church Hall, Sabbath School Hall
- Type: state heritage (built)
- Designated: 21 October 1992
- Reference no.: 600310
- Significant period: 1886 (fabric); 1886–1889, 1942, 1949 (historical)

St Paul's Presbyterian Church Hall is a heritage-listed church hall at 43 St Pauls Terrace, Spring Hill, City of Brisbane, Queensland, Australia. It was designed by Francis Drummond Greville Stanley and built in 1886. It is also known as Sabbath School Hall. It was added to the Queensland Heritage Register on 21 October 1992.

== History ==
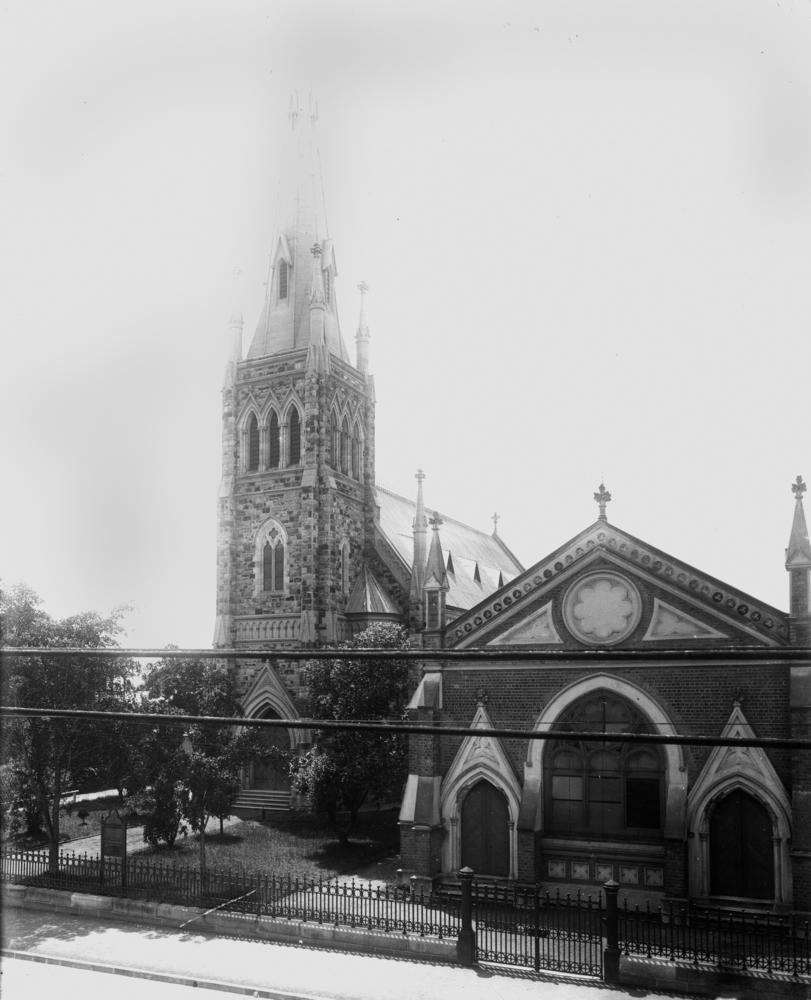
St Paul's Presbyterian Church (left) and Hall (right), circa 1912

The Sabbath School Hall, designed by colonial architect Francis Drummond Greville Stanley, was the first building to be erected on the Creek Street Presbyterian Church's newly acquired property in Leichhardt Street (now St Pauls Terrace), Spring Hill, in 1886.

It was built on the site of Brisbane's first children's hospital, a wooden building which was demolished to make room for the hall.

In form and fabric, the hall was designed well beyond immediate requirements, in anticipation of the Creek Street congregation playing a more prominent role in the development of Queensland Presbyterianism. From May 1886 to May 1889 the Sabbath School Hall functioned as a temporary church while the permanent St Paul's Church was under construction, establishing a precinct which later included church, hall and manse. The manse was demolished in the 1980s.

Over the subsequent century the hall became the focus for the church's social activities, and was home to an active Sunday School in the period prior to the First World War. An extensive library was established in the hall in connection with the Sunday School.

The building served more than the immediate congregation, and in the late 1920s was the venue for local gymnastic competitions.

Falling attendances at evening church services during the 1930s depression resulted in their being conducted in the hall, often in a less formal manner than the regular service.

In February 1942 during World War II the Australian defence authorities requisitioned the hall for possible use as an emergency centre during air raids, and from these premises the Hon. Robert Menzies conducted his final campaign meeting for the 1949 Australian federal election at which he became Prime Minister of Australia.

In 1982 sections of the exterior brickwork were renovated, and early in 1984 a new floor was laid, wiring and power points were renewed, plumbing was repaired and the interior was painted.

== Description ==
St Paul's Presbyterian Church Hall, designed in the gothic style with classical nuances, is a low, wide brick building with buttresses and stone facings, built to a T-shape plan with the leg abutting the street.

It is capped with a gabled roof clad in broad profile galvanised iron, above which square brick and stone pinnacles rise from the buttresses at the ends of each of the four gables.

The front facade, which has a northwest aspect, features a central, pointed-arch window with drip moulding, three green glass lights, tracery, and mullions; and gothic arched doorways with stone pediments above, on either side of the window. Above this is a broad pediment decorated with abbreviated blind panel tracery.

The interior, with its rendered walls, timber dado panelling and raised dais at the eastern end, is lit by rectangular multi-paned windows located in the bays along the sides.

The hall remains largely intact in form, fabric and function.

== Heritage listing ==
St Paul's Presbyterian Church Hall was listed on the Queensland Heritage Register on 21 October 1992 having satisfied the following criteria.

The place is important in demonstrating the evolution or pattern of Queensland's history.

St Paul's Presbyterian Church Hall, constructed in 1886, is significant historically as evidence of the Creek Street congregation's anticipation of playing a prominent role in Queensland Presbyterianism, and as an integral part of a cohesive ecclesiastical precinct formed with the adjoining St Paul's Presbyterian Church and boundary fence.

The place demonstrates rare, uncommon or endangered aspects of Queensland's cultural heritage.

It is a rare 1880s gothic-styled brick hall in Brisbane, and is an example of the ecclesiastical work of former colonial architect FDG Stanley.

The place is important in demonstrating the principal characteristics of a particular class of cultural places.

It is a rare 1880s gothic-styled brick hall in Brisbane, and is an example of the ecclesiastical work of former colonial architect FDG Stanley.

The place is important because of its aesthetic significance.

The place is important for its aesthetic contribution to the Spring Hill townscape.

The place has a strong or special association with a particular community or cultural group for social, cultural or spiritual reasons.

It is significant also for its community association as the first of the St Paul's precinct buildings on Spring Hill, and as a venue for local entertainments for over a century.

The place has a special association with the life or work of a particular person, group or organisation of importance in Queensland's history.

It is a rare 1880s gothic-styled brick hall in Brisbane, and is an example of the ecclesiastical work of former colonial architect FDG Stanley.
