= Lonsdale House =

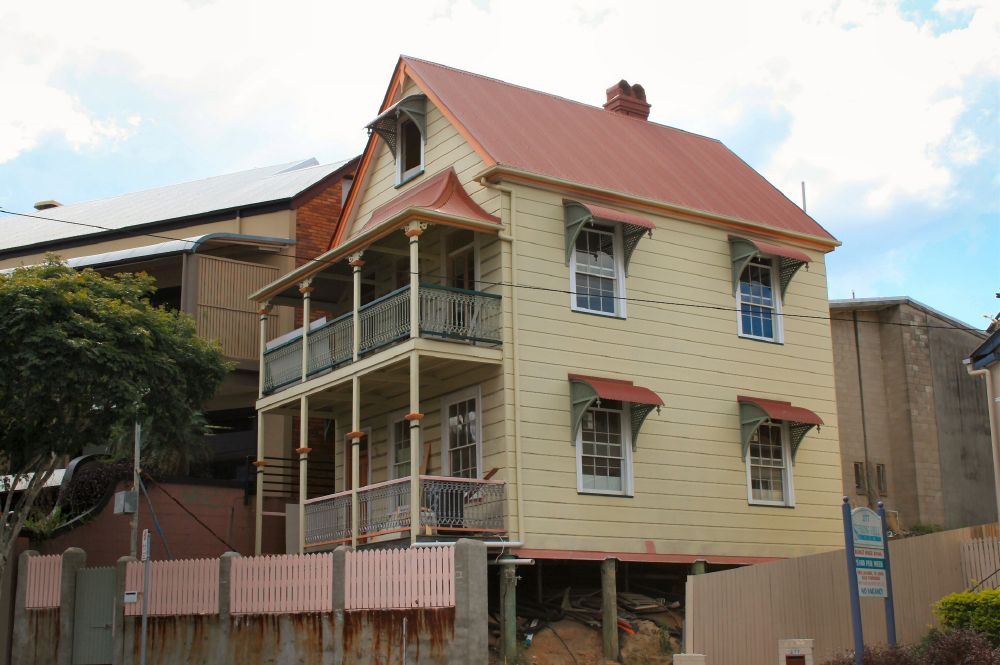
- Lonsdale House, 2009

- Location within Queensland Location within Australia
- 27.461°S 153.0274°E
- Location: 283 Boundary Street, Spring Hill, City of Brisbane, Queensland, Australia

History
- Design period: 1840s–1860s (mid-19th century)
- Built: 1860s circa – 1950s circa

Queensland Heritage Register
- Official name: Lonsdale House
- Type: state heritage (built)
- Designated: 27 August 1999
- Reference no.: 601159
- Significant period: 1860s–1870s, 1920s–1940s, 1950s (fabric); 1860s–1870s (historical)
- Significant components: kitchen/kitchen house, residential accommodation – main house, fence/wall – perimeter, views to, toilet block/earth closet/water closet, views from, attic

Lonsdale House is a heritage-listed detached house at 283 Boundary Street, Spring Hill, City of Brisbane, Queensland, Australia. It was built from 1860s circa to 1950s circa. It was added to the Queensland Heritage Register on 27 August 1999.

== History ==
This two-storeyed timber residence with attic was constructed by 1879, and possibly dates to the 1860s. It is located in the heart of Spring Hill in inner Brisbane, and is associated with the mid-19th century development of this area as one of the city's earliest dormitory suburbs.

Land in Spring Hill, much of it located within the original Brisbane town boundaries, was alienated in the 1850s and 1860s as large suburban allotments. Blocks along the ridge roads which became known as Wickham Terrace and Leichhardt Street, were the first to be taken up, followed by the area between Boundary Street (which formed the old northern limit to Brisbane Town) and Gregory Terrace. Subdivision of these allotments commenced from the 1850s, and Spring Hill, within easy walking distance of Queen Street, rapidly emerged as North Brisbane's first dormitory suburb, with little commercial or industrial base of its own. More affluent residents occupied the larger allotments and houses along the ridges, and the working classes occupied the valleys in between (Hanly's Valley and Spring Hollow). Subdivision accelerated during the 1870s and 1880s, and by 1900 Spring Hill was Brisbane's most densely populated suburb. From the 1860s a row of small shops was established along Leichhardt Street between Fortescue and Rogers Streets, with other shops congregated around the hotels at the intersections of Leichhardt Street with Edward, Wharf and Boundary Streets. In the 1870s and 1880s churches, schools, hospitals, a mechanics' institute and a tram service were established along Leichhardt Street, which became the hub of Spring Hill.

Boundary Street, running from the river west to Gregory Terrace, attracted a mainly working class population, including artisans, trades persons and labourers, with middle class residents occupying the higher blocks near Leichhardt Street and Gregory Terrace.

Lonsdale House, fronting Boundary Street close to the intersection with Leichhardt Street, was erected on part of Northern Suburban Allotment 97, an area of just under 3 acres (1.2 ha) alienated in 1853 by pastoralist David Cannon McConnel, and subdivided the same year. In December 1853 subdivision 16 of NSA 97 (22.5 perches (570 m^{2})) was re-subdivided into two blocks, 283 Boundary Street (12.5 perches (320 m^{2}) - site of Lonsdale House) and 277 Boundary Street (10 perches (250 m^{2})). An 1856 map of Brisbane shows two structures fronting Boundary Street, between what became Leichhardt and Phillips streets - the westernmost of these may have been located at 283 or 277 Boundary Street, but this is not clear.

In 1862 Robert Bourne of Brisbane acquired title to the 12.5 perches (320 m^{2}) re-subdivision fronting Boundary Street, and to the adjacent 10 perches (250 m^{2}) in 1864, by which time he was living in Spring Hill. Whether he erected Lonsdale House after obtaining title to the land, or whether it was already extant, is not known. Nor is it known whether he ever occupied the house. Robert Bourne and his wife Anne Butler were retired missionaries (associated with the London Missionary Society in Tahiti 1817–1827). They had business interests in Sydney and in Victoria in the 1830s and 1840s, and c. 1852 moved to Brisbane following the move there from Sydney in 1851 of their daughter and son-in-law, Harriet and George Raff. Bourne acquired a number of Brisbane properties, including 1a 20p of NSA 97 between Leichhardt and Phillips streets from DC McConnel in February 1856, and portion 192 [1a 3r 36p] on the southern side of Boundary Street in November 1856. He was resident in Leichhardt Street, Spring Hill by 1868, possibly in the two-storeyed brick residence he appears to have erected on the land he purchased from McConnel in 1856, adjoining the northern boundary of Lonsdale House. Bourne was Secretary to the Queensland Board of General Education from June 1860 to January 1870. He died at his home in Leichhardt Street in 1871, aged 78. His death was certified by his son Joseph Bourne of Boundary Street, Brisbane.

Following Bourne's death his Spring Hill properties were transferred to executors (sons-in-law George Raff of Brisbane and Stewart Murray of Sydney), and after Anne's death in December 1878, Raff offered the Spring Hill properties for sale by auction in August 1879. By this date, 4 houses had been erected on the property: Lonsdale House (a two-storeyed timber building with verandah and balcony front and back, containing seven rooms, with detached kitchen); a four-roomed timber cottage adjacent; the two-storeyed brick house behind; and Strathmore Cottage fronting Boundary Street opposite Lonsdale House. They were located close to the heart of Brisbane, on a rise, with breezes and fine views over the town and river.

Lonsdale House on 14.2 perches (360 m^{2}) (comprising the original 12.5 perches (320 m^{2}) re-subdivision plus extended northern and eastern boundaries) was purchased by Henry Lander Pethebridge for £350, with title transferred in March 1880.

Pethebridge, a carpenter and joiner and government Inspector of Works in the Portmaster's Office, was resident in Brisbane from at least April 1860, when he married Elizabeth Mary Symons. The family lived at various addresses in Spring Hill until the mid-1870s, when they left Brisbane briefly, but had returned by May 1877. Pethebridge was employed in the Department of Harbours, Lighthouses and Pilots, and supervised construction of Cape Bowling Green Lighthouse in the early 1870s. In August 1874 he was appointed Inspector of Works (Class IV) in the Department, a position he held until 1900. The Pethebridges occupied Lonsdale House after their purchase of the property. Mrs Pethebridge died in 1894, but Henry remained at 283 Boundary Street until his death in 1910, after which the property passed to his son, Samuel Augustus Pethebridge of Melbourne, and son-in-law Edward J Atkinson of Brisbane, as trustees. Lonsdale House then was rented out to a series of tenants who used the place as a boarding house.

Sir Samuel Augustus Pethebridge died in January 1918, and in August that year, 283 Boundary Street was transferred to Bridget Kenny of Spring Hill. The property changed hands several times in the 1920s, and from c. 1934 was occupied by the Hough family. Herbert Hough obtained title to the property in 1946, ane retained this until 1956. From the 1950s, if not earlier, the house was utilised as a boarding house of 9 rooms, (1 room enclosed on the first floor rear verandah and 1 room in the kitchen wing, in addition to the 7 rooms in the core of the house), and a second ground-level kitchen was constructed at the rear, c. 1950s. Title was transferred to the present owners in 1966.

Lonsdale House is a rare surviving early inner-city residence, and was identified in the Brisbane History Group's 1993 Spring Hill Heritage Tour as a place of cultural heritage interest.

== Description ==
Lonsdale House is located in Boundary Street, Spring Hill, close to the intersection with St Paul's Terrace, on a small elevated block overlooking central Brisbane. It is a two-storeyed timber house with attic rooms, with double-storey verandahs to front (south) and back (north) elevations, and single-storey extensions to the rear. The exterior is clad with 12" deep pine chamfer boards. Built on a slope running west–east, the house is partly high-set on timber stumps or replacement concrete stumps. Because of the slope of the land, there are stairs on the western side leading from the street to the "ground" level front verandah.

The main house has a steeply pitched gabled roof covered in galvanised corrugated iron. There are early hipped, concave, corrugated-iron verandah roofs to the upper level verandahs. The single-storey rear extension on the west side has a hipped roof, and the single-storey extension to the east side has a mono-pitch roof, both covered in corrugated galvanised iron. There is a central brick chimney rising above the main roof, and resting on stone foundations. The front verandahs have timber posts with decorative capitals and fretwork brackets. On the lower level the timber balustrade has simple timber dowel in-fill and there is a timber lattice valance. Two of the bays are in-filled with timber lattice privacy screens. The first floor has a cast iron balustrade.

The front elevation at ground level has a more recent timber-framed, glass entrance door with fanlight over on the west side, and a pair of 6-over-6 timber vertical sash windows. These have narrow glazing bars with no horn to the top sash, and the glass appears original or early. To the first floor there are three early double casement doors with glazed fanlights over, opening onto the front upper-level verandah. The front gable has a centrally placed 6-over-6 timber vertical sash window, over which is a convex curved corrugated-iron window hood, supported on curved timber brackets with decorative pendants, in-filled with a cross lattice.

The east side elevation of the main house has a pair of 6-over-6 timber vertical sash windows to the ground floor and first floor, with the same materials and detailing as those at the front. All have convex corrugated iron window hoods, supported on curved timber brackets with decorative pendants, in-filled with a cross lattice. There are no windows on the west side.

The rear elevation of the main house is obscured by the double-storey verandah which is in filled and the two single-story ground-level extensions. The gable has a centrally placed 6-over-6 timber vertical sash window, over which is a hood of the same design as the front and side elevations.

The single storey western extension at the rear is rectangular, with a corrugated iron stove recess at the north end, with an iron stove chimney. There is a door in the north elevation and a timber-framed window in the west side elevation. It is clad with 8" deep chamferboards and has a galvanised corrugated iron hipped roof. It appears to be of an early date.

The rear extension on the east side is elongated with two windows in the east side elevation. It is clad with fibrous-cement sheeting, with a galvanised corrugated iron mono-pitch roof running down to form a valley gutter with the extension on the west side. There is a small lean-to extension at the northern end of this extension, also clad in fibrous-cement sheeting, with a window in the western side wall. There are two lean-to corrugated iron roofs running off these two single-storey extensions at the rear.

The rear yard has a corrugated iron roof structure in the north west corner under which is a small, brick WC outbuilding. In the north east corner is a timber-framed carport. The front boundary has a brick wall with brick piers, painted and in-filled with vertical timber picket fencing.

Internally, the ground floor has a full-length hall on the west side with a steep timber staircase running up the side wall. The single- flight staircase has four stairs turning onto the first floor landing, and has a turned newel post and simple stick balusters. The hall has a timber arch with decorative brackets separating vestibule from stairwell. The vestibule has a c. 1940s decorative plaster ceiling; the remainder of the hall (ceiling and walls) is covered in fibrous-cement or ply-wood sheeting with timber battens. Two rooms, one front and one back, open off the hall on the ground floor. The front room has two timber 6 over 6 timber vertical sliding sash windows to the front (south) elevation and 1 to the side elevation. The ceiling is lined in jointed timber boarding with a decorative timber (gas) vent. The walls are lined with ply-wood timber sheeting with battens. The north dividing wall has double and single leaf 4 panel timber doors leading to the room at the rear. The rear room has a single 6:6 timber vertical sliding sash window to the side elevation, and a blocked window to the rear (north) elevation. There is a fireplace with early timber fire surround. The ceiling is lined with timber boarding with central timber decorative (gas) vent. The walls are lined with plywood sheeting with timber battens.

A door with fanlight over, leads from the hall out onto the rear verandah, which has been in-filled. On the west side is a small store room, while on the east side the verandah has been incorporated into a later kitchen extension. This extension is lined (walls and ceiling) with what appears to be compressed timber sheeting and has c. 1950s detailing and fittings.

On the west side the single-storey rear extension, an early service wing formerly detached from the main house, has walls and coved ceiling lined with timber tongue and groove boarding with a narrow beading. This wing is divided into two rooms by a wall of vertically jointed tongue and groove timber. Access to the southern room (possibly a former servant's room) is off the verandah. It has timber small-pane sash windows to the east and west side elevations. The rear room (early kitchen) has a corrugated iron stove recess in the rear [north] wall and a door to the rear yard area. A narrow enclosed corridor runs between the two extensions to the rear yard area.

The first floor has a generous landing providing access to 3 rooms and the rear verandah, and staircase access to the roof space. To the rear [north] elevation is a blocked window, and a narrow timber 8 panel door leading out onto the enclosed verandah. There are two rooms to the front (south) side of the house and one to the rear. The front room on the west side has a double casement timber and glazed door, with fanlight over, leading out onto the verandah. The doors have a single timber panel to the bottom, and 4 horizontal panes over with a marginal glazing bar detail, and margins in-filled with coloured glass. Walls and ceiling are lined with timber boarding. The front room on the east side has two double casement doors, with fanlights over, leading onto the verandah, of the same design as the adjoining room. There is a 6:6 timber vertical sash window to the side elevation. Walls and ceiling lined with timber boards. The room to the rear has a fireplace with early timber fireplace surround. There is a single 6:6 timber vertical sash window to the side elevation, and a blocked door opening onto the rear the verandah. Walls and ceiling are lined with timber boards.

The rear verandah is fully enclosed, and partly extended on the west side. A narrow corridor runs from the landing access door onto the verandah to a window and a fire escape door. On the west side are two small rooms, the first containing a shower and basin, the second a toilet. The enclosed verandah on the east side is lined with ripple iron. It has a window to the east side elevation and rear elevation. Timber decking runs from the fire escape door across the roofs of the single story ground-level extensions.

A narrow straight flight of stairs runs from the first floor landing to a small landing in the roof area which is lit by a small skylight. It provides access to two rooms, one to the front (south) side and one to the rear (north) side. The room to the front is lined with wide timber boarding, and has a centrally placed 6 over 6 timber vertical sash window in the gable end. A small access door to the roof space reveals closely spaced battens to the rafters, providing clear evidence that the roof originally had timber shingles. The room to the rear is L-shaped. It has a chimney, but no fireplace, and a single timber sash window to the gable. Walls and ceiling are lined with timber boarding.

Floors throughout are of timber.

== Heritage listing ==
Lonsdale House was listed on the Queensland Heritage Register on 27 August 1999 having satisfied the following criteria.

The place is important in demonstrating the evolution or pattern of Queensland's history.

Lonsdale House, erected by 1879, provides important surviving evidence of the development of Spring Hill as an early dormitory suburb of Brisbane.

The place demonstrates rare, uncommon or endangered aspects of Queensland's cultural heritage.

It is a rare surviving building of its type (a mid-19th century, 3-level, Georgian-style, detached timber town-house) in Brisbane, and is important in illustrating the principal characteristics of its type, including the town-house form with the entrance set to one side of the house; attic rooms with dormers; wide vestibule and narrow, steep internal staircases; early joinery (French doors, narrow-mullioned windows, simple stick balustrading to the staircases); early exterior decorative detailing; and early, formerly detached, kitchen wing.

The place is important in demonstrating the principal characteristics of a particular class of cultural places.

It is a rare surviving building of its type (a mid-19th century, 3-level, Georgian-style, detached timber town-house) in Brisbane, and is important in illustrating the principal characteristics of its type, including the town-house form with the entrance set to one side of the house; attic rooms with dormers; wide vestibule and narrow, steep internal staircases; early joinery (French doors, narrow-mullioned windows, simple stick balustrading to the staircases); early exterior decorative detailing; and early, formerly detached, kitchen wing.

The place is important because of its aesthetic significance.

The building is significant for its aesthetic quality and contribution to the streetscape of Boundary Street and to the Spring Hill townscape.
