= Moody's Cottages =

Pair of heritage houses in Queensland

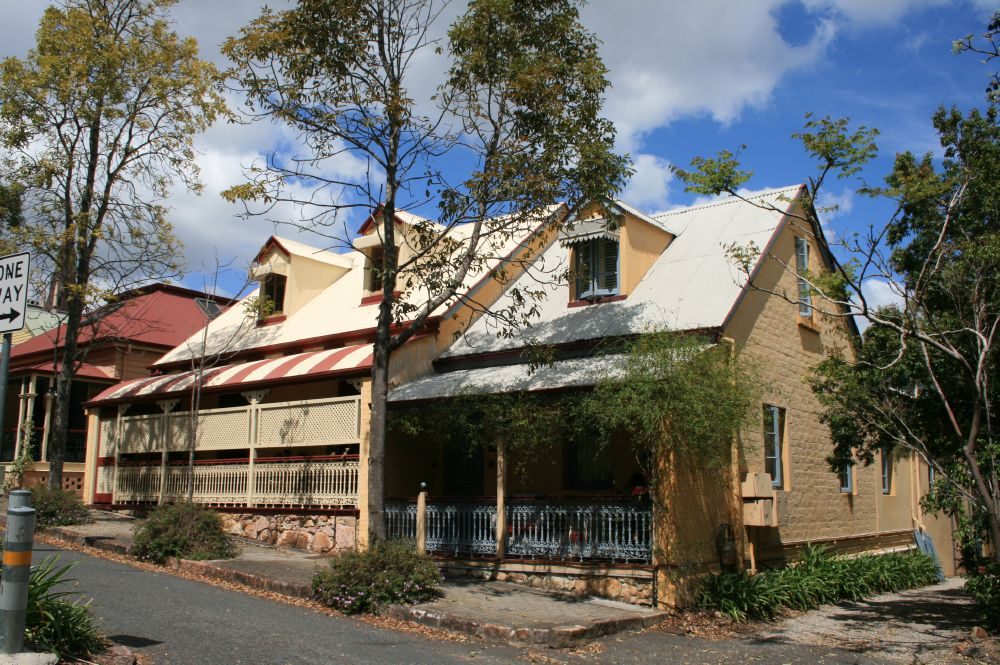
- Moody's semi-detached cottages (Cooee and neighbour), 2008

- Location within Queensland Location within Australia
- 27.4593°S 153.0266°E
- Location: 8–12, & 16 Victoria Street, Spring Hill, City of Brisbane, Queensland, Australia

History
- Design period: 1870s–1890s (late 19th century)
- Built: c. 1875

Queensland Heritage Register
- Official name: Moody's Cottages, Allandoon, Cooee
- Type: state heritage (built)
- Designated: 21 October 1992
- Reference no.: 600314
- Significant period: 1870s (fabric, historical)
- Significant components: residential accommodation – maisonette/s / duplex, attic, residential accommodation – main house

Moody's Cottages are a heritage-listed pair of houses, one a duplex and the other a detached house, at 8–12, & 16 Victoria Street, Spring Hill, City of Brisbane, Queensland, Australia. It was built c. 1875. It is also known as Allandoon and Cooee. It was added to the Queensland Heritage Register on 21 October 1992.

== History ==
Moody's Cottages were constructed probably in the mid-1870s. They comprise a pair of semi-detached brick houses (Cooee and an unnamed neighbour) and an adjacent, detached brick house called Allandoon.

William Moody, a letter carrier employed by the Brisbane Post Office, acquired subdivisions 23 and 24 of portion 236, parish of North Brisbane, in early 1870. Whether any buildings existed on the site, which Moody had purchased from William John Farmer Cooksley, a Brisbane builder, is not known. Although directories reveal Moody was resident in Brisbane by 1874, he is not listed specifically as living in Victoria Street until 1876.

In September 1874 the property was re-surveyed into three equal resubdivisions by Richard Gailey, licensed surveyor and a leading Brisbane architect, and it is likely that he was the designer of the cottages.

The survey plan was signed by both William Moody and Thomas Spilsbury, a compositor and later Queen Street confectioner, whose purchase of resubdivision 3 from Moody was registered immediately the survey was completed. On this property Spilsbury raised a mortgage of £280, which may have financed the construction of the three houses, in partnership with Moody. The mortgage was released in April 1876, and the resubdivision was resold to Moody in May of the same year.

Little is known of Moody's background which might account for how a postman, promoted to mail sorter in the 1880s, was able to become the owner of three brick houses.

Moody's houses remained the property of his daughters Susannah, Hannah and Margaret Jane until 1949.

Allandoon was renovated in the 1980s, and remains a private residence. In 1988 the semi-detached houses were converted into a house and gallery/studio by well known Brisbane artist Rick Everingham, and the name Cooee is generally applied to the pair.

== Description ==
=== The Duplex (Cooee and neighbour) ===
Cooee and its unnamed neighbour originally formed a pair of semi-detached, single-storeyed brick cottages with separate, steeply pitched gabled roofs containing attic spaces lit by dormer windows. The galvanised iron roofs are likely to have been shingled originally.

The foundations are of Brisbane tuff and the exterior and party walls are brick on edge ['rats nest' bond], a cheaper form of construction seen occasionally in surviving Brisbane buildings of the 1860s and 1870s, such as the 1863 Callender House (Theosophical Society Building) on Wickham Terrace.

The buildings follow the slope down Victoria Street, with the southeastern house higher than its attached neighbour.

Both houses have narrow front verandahs adjacent to the street pavement. These have separate convex galvanised iron roofs, timber posts with replaced fretwork brackets, cast-aluminium balustrading and brick end walls of English bond construction. Timber lattice has been added to the verandah of the higher house.

No. 8, the top house and the larger of the two, consists of a central brick core with four rooms, an end hallway which leads through the house to an attached kitchen/dining room and bathroom (twentieth century additions), and two attic bedrooms. French doors open from the two front rooms onto the verandah. Internal walls are of brick or vertically jointed pine boards, and cedar doors with fanlights are a feature.

No.12 is a smaller building consisting of two main rooms, attic bedroom, and hallway with a pressed metal ceiling which leads to the rear of the house, where twentieth century kitchen, dining room and bathroom facilities have been added. In 1988 false ceilings were installed in the main rooms to accommodate track lighting, and the house was converted into an art gallery, the attic room becoming an artist's studio.

By early 1989 the pair had become a house and gallery/studio with the removal of a section of the brick party wall.

Despite some alteration to both structure and fabric, the former semi-detached houses retain their basic form and materials, present a reasonably intact exterior to the street, and are of a housing type rare in Brisbane.

=== Allandoon ===
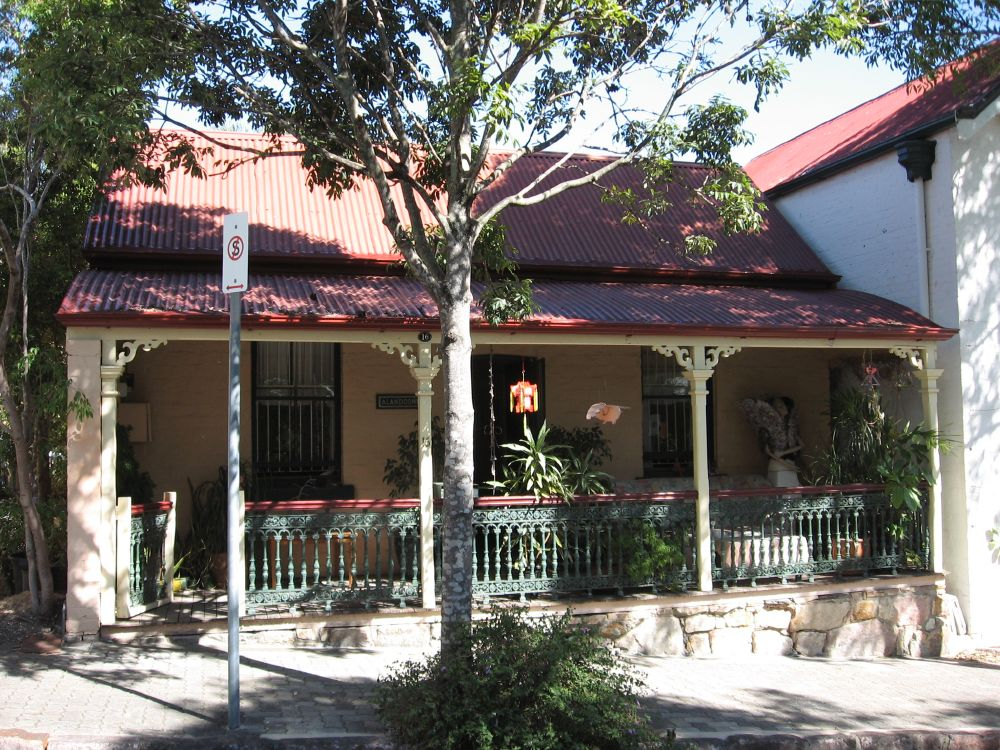
Moody's Cottages - Allandoon, 2009

Allandoon is a small, single-storeyed brick house, rectangular in shape, with a gabled roof of corrugated iron which probably was shingled originally.

The foundations are of Brisbane tuff and the earliest section of the building is constructed of brick on edge ('rats nest' bond), the same technique used in the adjacent semi-detached cottages.

A narrow front verandah, which has a convex corrugated iron roof, timber posts, fretwork brackets, cast-aluminium balustrading and brick end walls of English bond construction, abuts the street pavement.

Internally the house consists of four main rooms opening off a central hallway, with later kitchen, dining and bathroom facilities added at the rear.

The house presents a reasonably intact exterior to the street, and is painted in heritage shades.

== Heritage listing ==
Moody's Cottages was listed on the Queensland Heritage Register on 21 October 1992 having satisfied the following criteria.

The place is important in demonstrating the evolution or pattern of Queensland's history.

Moody's Cottages are significant historically as important surviving evidence of the growth of Spring Hill as a dormitory suburb in the 1860s and 1870s, and in particular of the area between Leichhardt Street and Gregory Terrace.

The place demonstrates rare, uncommon or endangered aspects of Queensland's cultural heritage.

They are rare Brisbane examples of masonry working-class homes of the 1870s, rarer still for their brick and stone construction, brick on edge work, and gable style. They include a rare example of 1870s masonry, semi-detached working class housing in Brisbane.

The place is important in demonstrating the principal characteristics of a particular class of cultural places.

They include a rare example of 1870s masonry, semi-detached working class housing in Brisbane.

The place is important because of its aesthetic significance.

The cottages have aesthetic value and are important for their streetscape contribution. They are an integral part of the Victoria and Rogers Streets historical precinct, as identified under the Spring Hill development control plan.
