= Fortitude Valley State Secondary College =

Location
- 585 St Pauls Terrace; Fortitude Valley, Queensland, 4006; Australia; 27.4532°S 153.0367°E

Information
- Type: Secondary nondenominational public school
- Motto: Bold Resilient Kind
- Established: 2020
- Principal: Sharon Barker
- Enrolment: 837 (As of 2025)
- Colours: Yellow and blue
- Website: fortitudevalleyssc.eq.edu.au

Fortitude Valley State Secondary College (FVSSC) is a co-educational Queensland secondary school located in Fortitude Valley, Brisbane.

== History ==
In 2014 due to an increase of enrollments at the surrounding Kelvin Grove State College the announcement was made by Queensland Minister of Education John-Paul Langbroek to build a new secondary college on the grounds of Fortitude Valley State School which had closed in 2013 due to low student numbers, despite a prolonged campaign by parents and students to keep it open. The main building of the previous Fortuitude Valley State School was transformed into the music block and the oval was used as space to build the first of two, six-story tall vertical buildings with construction completed halfway through 2019. FVSSC was opened on the 28th of January 2020 to 137 students of the class of 2025 (Year 7 at the time), with a new grade level being added every year until the school reached full operation in 2025.

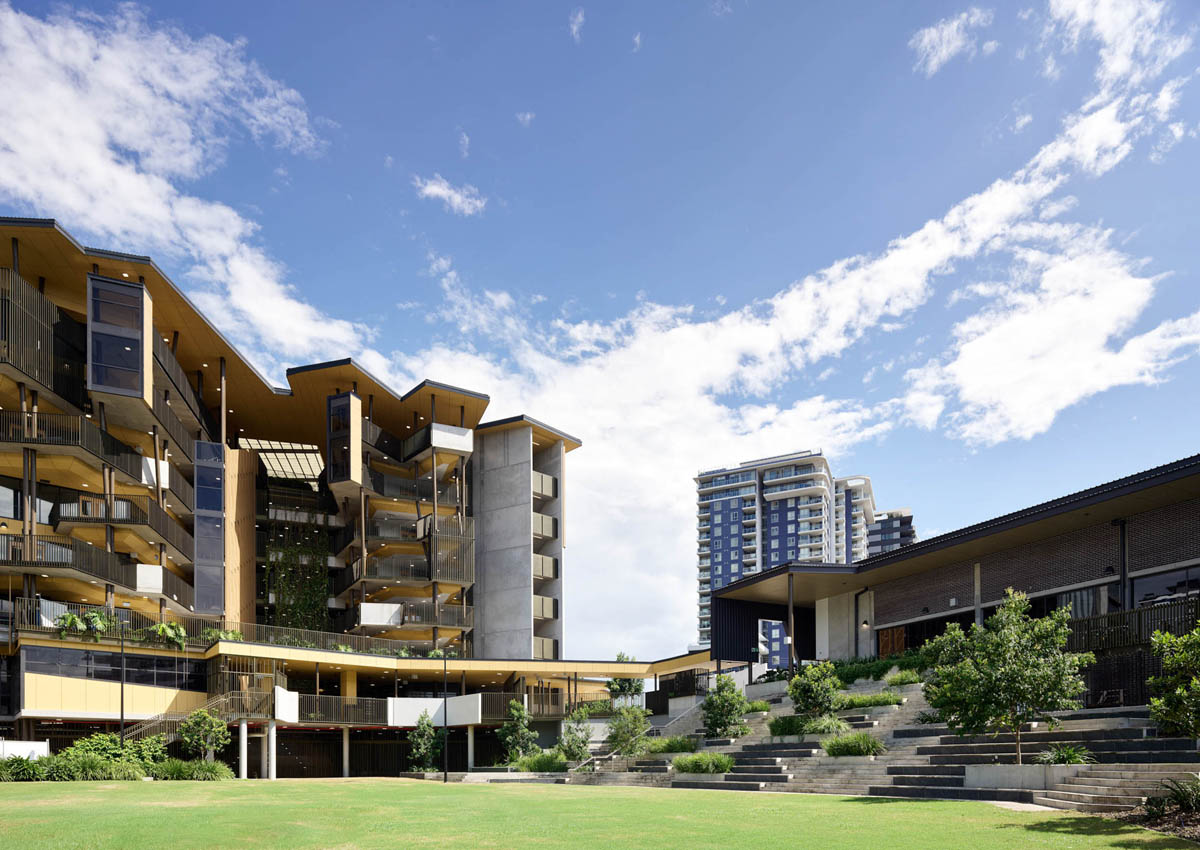
Fortitude Valley State Secondary College, 2025

== Controversy ==
In December 2019, a month prior to the school's opening, the Department of Education (Queensland) confirmed the school would be fitted with self-contained gender-neutral cubicles and shared basin areas. This decision sparked outrage among parents and members of the local community, with the opposition spokesperson for Education, Jarrod Bleijie, publicly stating, "I reckon boys and girls need and deserve their own privacy at school." A month later, Premier Annastacia Palaszczuk overturned this decision after she raised concerns that boys and girls should have their own toilet facilities.
