= Brisbane Normal School =

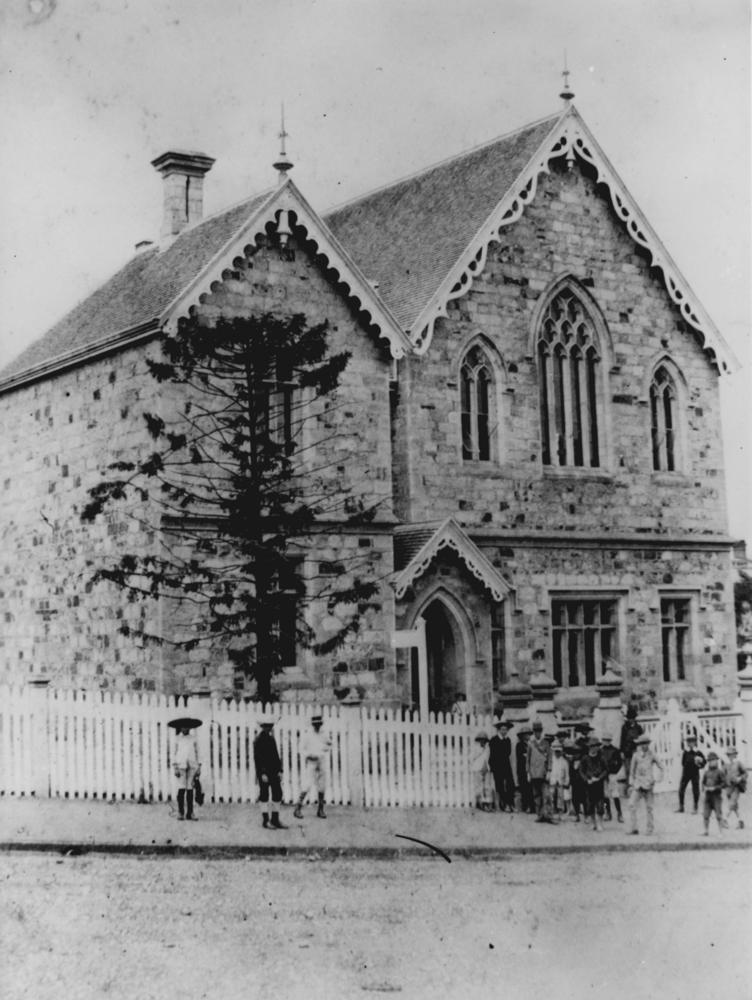
Street view of Normal School, Brisbane, ca. 1885

The Brisbane Normal School (initially known as the Brisbane National School) was the first school established by the Queensland Government. It was in Brisbane and operated from 1860 to 1927.

== History ==
In early 1860, the National Board of Education (a Queensland Government organisation) established the National School (Number 1) in Brisbane. It opened on 2 April 1860 under headmaster John Rendall. On the opening day, the attendance was 50 boys and 8 girls. The school was located in Adelaide Street and was conducted as a school for boys and girls until 14 August 1860. In 1862, the National School became officially known as the Normal School when it was re-organised to include a training school for teachers. In December 1862, the boys' school and the Board of Education moved to the new building next door at the corner of Adelaide and Edward Streets, while the girls remained in the original building.The name of the school varied, originally being the Brisbane National School, afterwards called the Brisbane Central School and then the Brisbane Normal School. Later, the children were separated into three schools: Brisbane Central Girls' School, Brisbane Central Infants' School and Brisbane Central Boys' School. In 1920, the three schools were recombined to create the Central State School. In 1922, this became known as the Central Practising School. In September 1927, the headmaster, staff and pupils were relocated from the old Normal School buildings to the Leichhardt Street State School (later renamed Brisbane Central State School, which is still operating as at 2025).

The Normal School building erected in 1862 was demolished at the end of 1927.

== Notable alumni ==
- William Kelso, Member of the Queensland Legislative Assembly
