= Spring Hill Reservoirs =

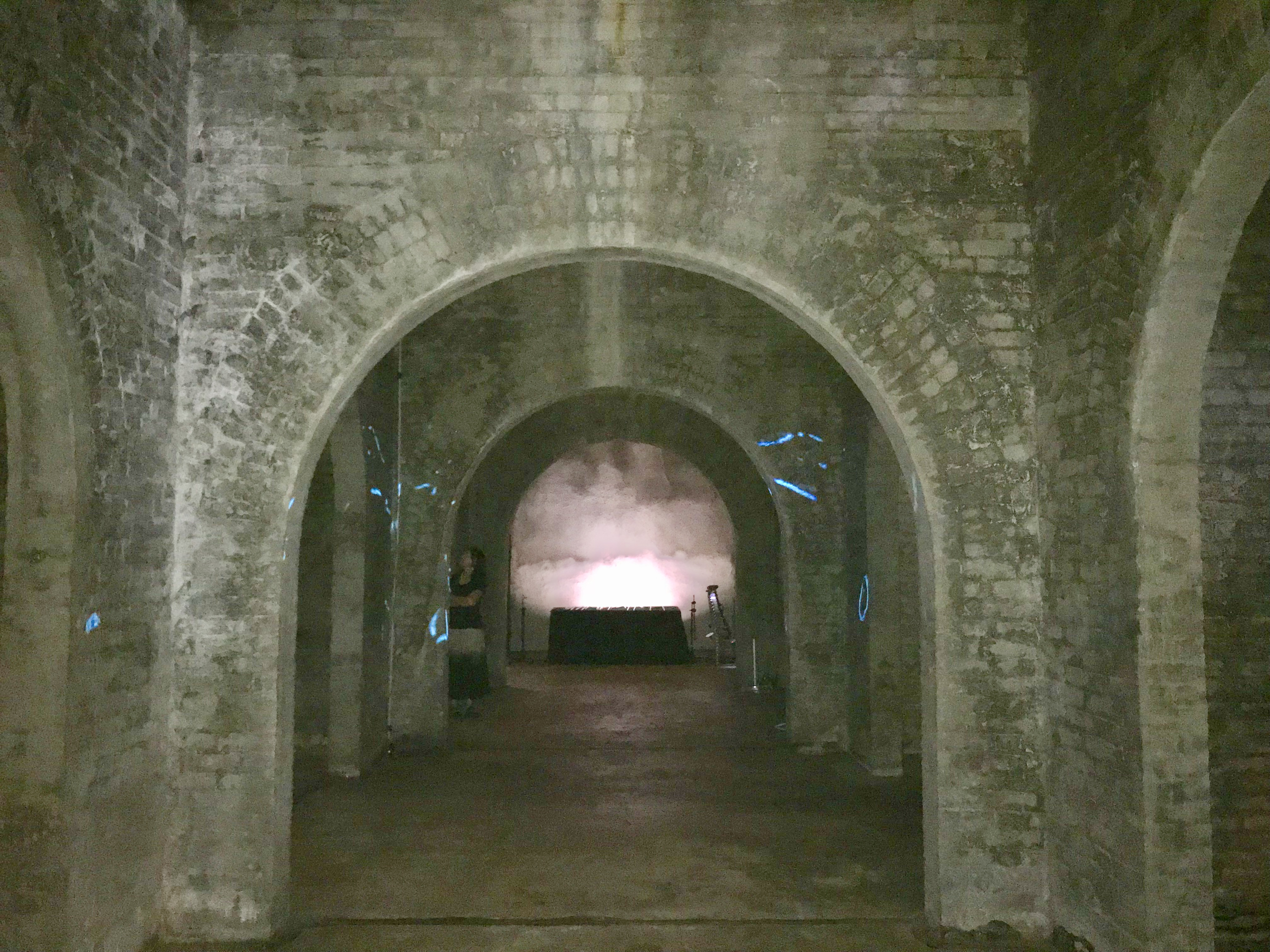
- Spring Hill Reservoirs, 2017

- Location within Queensland
- 27.4661°S 153.0231°E
- Location: 230 Wickham Terrace, Spring Hill, City of Brisbane, Queensland, Australia

History
- Design period: 1870s–1890s (late 19th century)
- Built: 1871–1882

Queensland Heritage Register
- Official name: Service Reservoirs
- Type: state heritage (built)
- Designated: 21 October 1992
- Reference no.: 600174
- Significant period: 1871, 1882 (fabric); 1870s–1880s, 1900s–1960s (historical)
- Significant components: tank – reservoir
- Builders: Henry Holmes

The Spring Hill Reservoirs are two heritage-listed former underground water storage reservoirs within Wickham Park at 230 Wickham Terrace, Spring Hill, City of Brisbane, Queensland, Australia (close to the Old Windmill). They are also known as Service Reservoirs. They were added to the Queensland Heritage Register on 21 October 1992.

The first reservoir was built in 1871, and the second just metres from the first some eleven years after. Both were built primarily of red-brick and mortar, set in-ground. Interiors feature columns and arches between walls for reinforcement. At the time of planning, Spring Hill was considered to be the ideal location for a Brisbane water source, due to its elevation above most of what is now Brisbane CBD. Water was sourced from Enoggera Dam via gravity feed. They were built in 1871 and 1882 by Henry Holmes. They serviced water to what is now Brisbane City until 1962. Currently, the reservoirs are covered by three hut-like structures above ground. For many years the reservoirs were locked and inaccessible to the public. However, since 2014, they are used occasionally for cultural events.

== History ==
The reservoirs were built as an essential part of Brisbane's second phase of water supply development. During the first self-service stage, the inhabitants relied mostly upon natural water courses, wells, tanks and water-carriers. The only public supply was the old convict dam and a hardwood pipeline in the Roma Street hollow (1838), supplemented by an elevated tank in Tank Street (1859). So inadequate and polluted was the water supply that this became a controversial issue as soon as the Brisbane Municipal Council was formed and Queensland's Separation gained in 1859. Despite strenuous debate amongst aldermen regarding the best solution, and continual conflict between council and parliament over control, the new water supply system from Enoggera Dam was constructed by the Brisbane Board of Waterworks and their engineer Joseph Brady in 1863–1866. This was the first reticulated gravity supply and the first municipal engineering undertaking in Queensland. Although Brisbane Mayor Thomas Blacket Stephens proposed a service reservoir on Windmill Hill (Wickham Terrace) as early as 1862, this was postponed for financial reasons until 1871, when the water pressure was already inadequate due to population expansion and increased consumption. Henry Holmes was the prominent building contractor. Further complaints led to the provision of the second, larger reservoir in 1882, particularly to service the high parts of South Brisbane and Kangaroo Point. Other improvements were made in the water supply system which coped with the population boom of the 1880s, including the building of the Gold Creek Dam in 1885–1886, and of the Highgate Hill service reservoir which was of mass concrete rather than arched brick walls in 1889. The commissioning of Mount Crosby pumping station in 1893 marked the decline of gravity water supply. The Spring Hill reservoirs were not used after the Gold Creek dam improved reticulation pressure from 1886 onwards, until a new policy of constructing service reservoirs to reduce the load on trunk mains was recommended in 1903. This resulted in reconditioning of the reservoirs in 1904–1905, including reconnection with the original Enoggera watermain, and the provision of roofs to prevent the growth of algae, a spray inlet, a floating outlet and a relief valve for the Mount Crosby supply. Other inground reservoirs were built on the hills of Brisbane and continue to serve the city today. The Spring Hill reservoirs remained an integral part of the Brisbane water supply system until 3 September 1962 when the watermain was shut down, unable to serve an increasingly highrise inner city due to their comparatively small capacity and low elevation. Redevelopment proposals during the 1980s included converting the area into an art gallery, restaurant, theatre in the round and bus exchange.

In 2014, the Underground Opera Company performed in the reservoirs, having spent 3 years cleaning them. The tickets sold out and the Company entered into an arrangement to continue to use the reservoirs for opera until 2017.

== Description ==
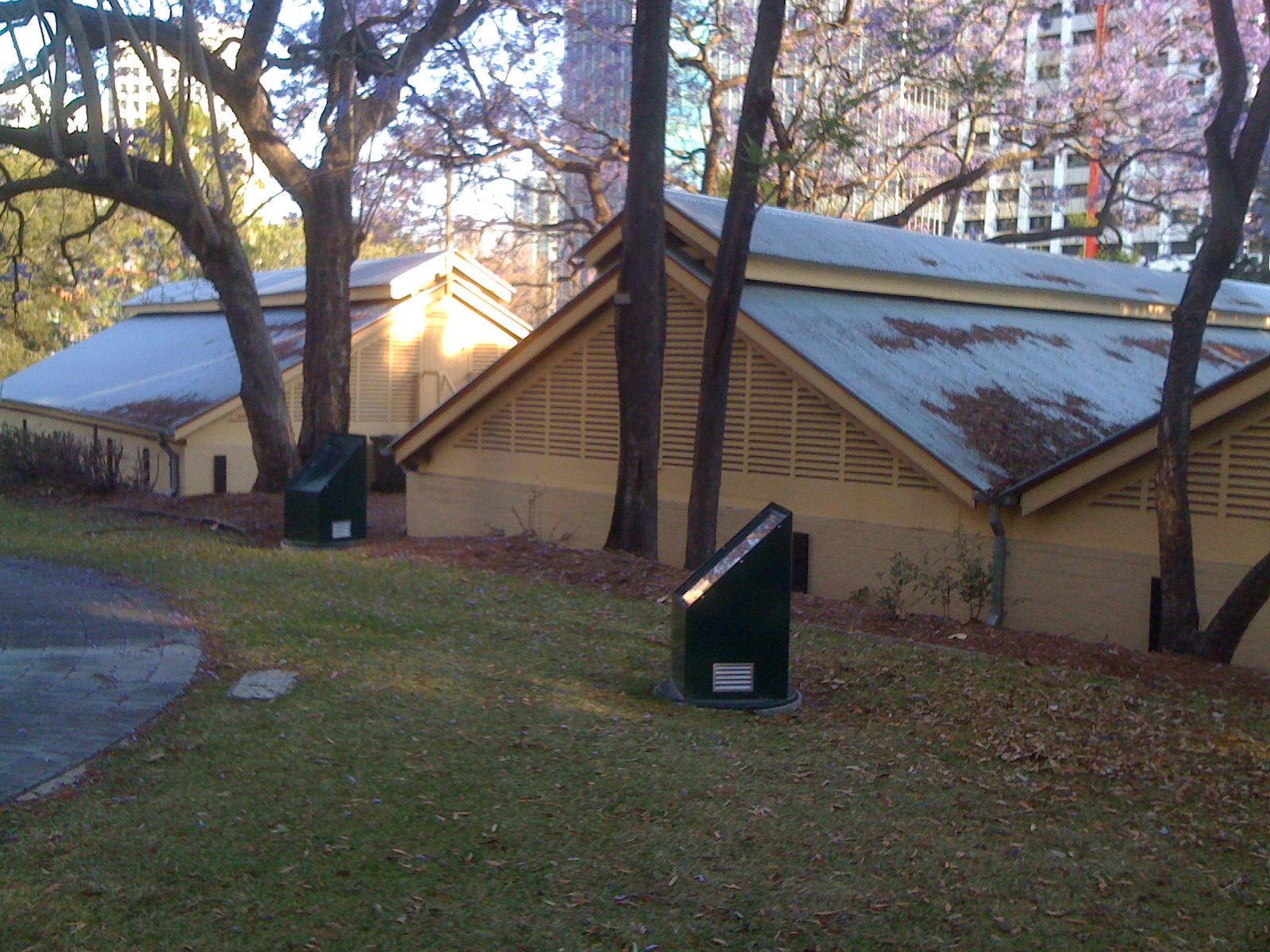
Exterior

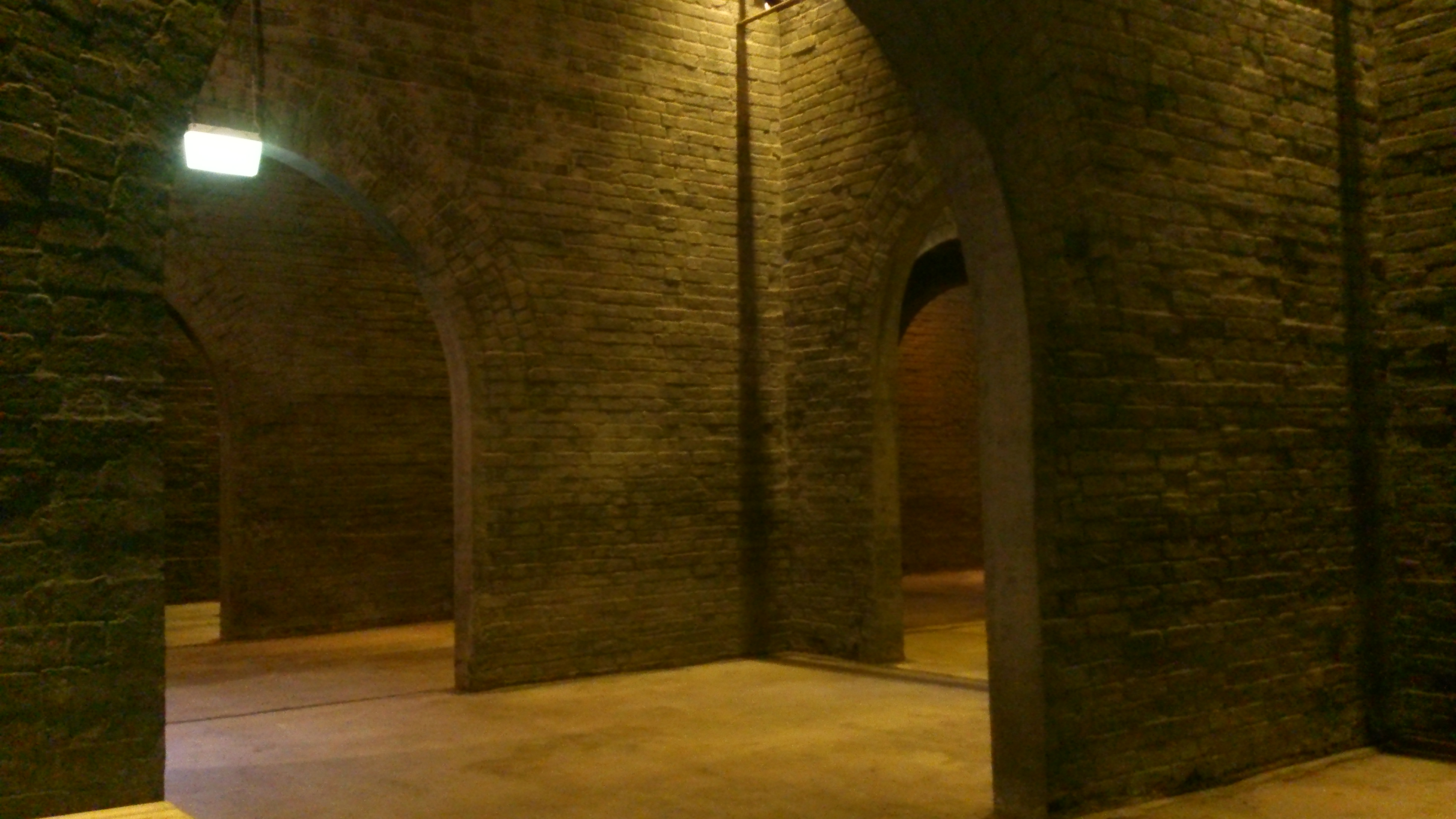
Interior

The low-lying, rectangular and gable-roofed structures behind the Old Windmill Tower conceal Brisbane's first inground service reservoirs. The earlier smaller structure has a single gable roof, while the larger, later one is double-gabled. Excavated deep into the crest of the hill, the disused reservoirs comprise two box-form structures divided into compartments by high arched baffle walls, cast-iron inlet and outlet, valve chambers and pits, and main, outlet and scour pipes. Built of brick before the age of concrete, this type of construction was necessary to withstand external pressure, while the inside walls were rendered to obviate ground water infiltration. The corrugated iron roofs with ample ventilation right along the raised ridges, timber-louvered gables and doorways to descending iron ladders were added later, and evidently painted in contrasting coloured stripes as was the fashion. The service reservoirs, which were built to store water from the Enoggera Dam and improve pressure within the city, played a most important role in Brisbane's first reticulated gravity supply system for the best part of a century.

== Art installation ==
In 2017, the site hosted an art installation by Meaghan Streader that featured neon lights.

== Heritage listing ==
The Spring Hill Reservoirs were listed on the Queensland Heritage Register on 21 October 1992 having satisfied the following criteria.

The place is important in demonstrating the evolution or pattern of Queensland's history.

The Spring Hill service reservoirs are an historic expression of demographic growth, improvement in living standards and local politics in Brisbane during the years of early self-government.

The place demonstrates rare, uncommon or endangered aspects of Queensland's cultural heritage.

In Queensland they are the first of a series of inground reservoirs, but quite unusual in being the only ones known to have been built of brick with arched baffle walls rather than concrete.

The place has potential to yield information that will contribute to an understanding of Queensland's history.

The sub-surface pits, chambers and pipes, and the sites of the two former houses have the potential to reveal technical and archaeological evidence.

The place is important in demonstrating the principal characteristics of a particular class of cultural places.

In Australian context there are important differences in form, material and dating between each of the above reservoirs; but their similarities, particularly between Spring Hill and Adelaide, are such that the former may be treated as a significant example of its type.

The place is important because of its aesthetic significance.

In addition the reservoirs have long formed a pleasing part of the "Windmill Hill" reserves, which also include the old convict windmill, a reconstructed signal flagstaff and surrounding parkland. Their dimly lit, resonant and monumental interior spaces are also atmospheric in character.

The place is important in demonstrating a high degree of creative or technical achievement at a particular period.

As an important part of the Enoggera waterworks system, and a simple but handsome solution to the problem of an adequate water supply, the reservoirs represent both a technical and a creative achievement of the Colonial era.

== See also ==
- The Old Windmill, Brisbane
- Enoggera Dam
