= Brisbane Central State School =

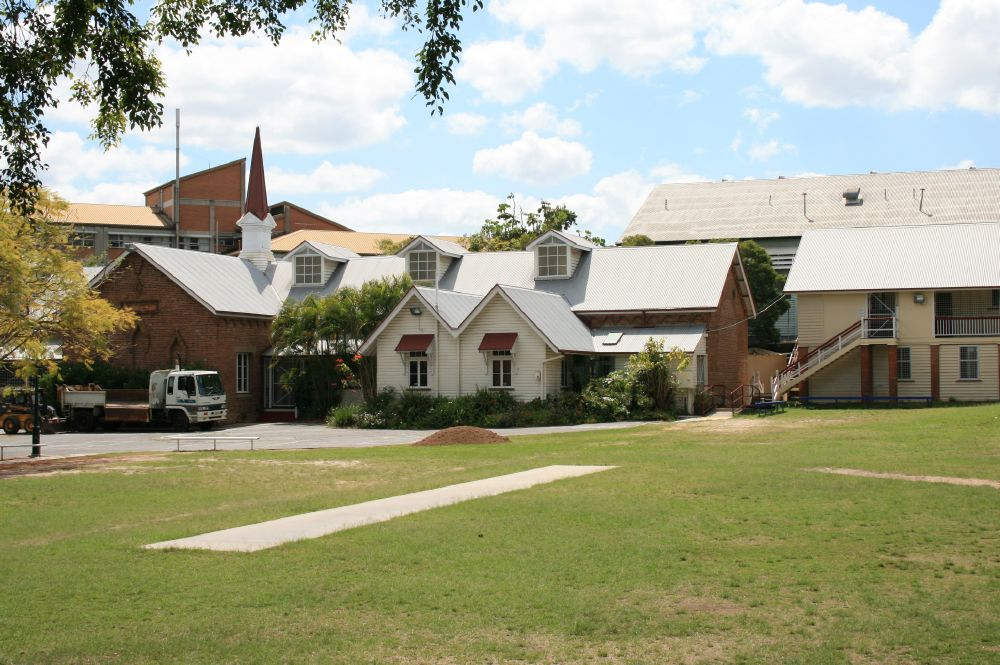
- The school in 2008

- Location within Queensland Location within Australia
- 27.4589°S 153.0276°E
- Location: Rogers Street, Spring Hill, City of Brisbane, Queensland, Australia

History
- Design period: 1870s–1890s (late 19th century)
- Built: 1874–c. 1927

Site notes
- Architect: Richard George Suter

Queensland Heritage Register
- Official name: Brisbane Central State School, Brisbane Central State School, Leichhardt Street (practising) School, Leichhardt Street State School for Boys, Girls, Infants
- Type: state heritage (built)
- Designated: 21 October 1992
- Reference no.: 600312
- Significant period: 1870s–1880s, 1900s–1910s, 1920s (fabric); 1875 ongoing (social); 1870s–1880s (historical)
- Significant components: hospital, classroom/classroom block/teaching area, school/school room, play shed
- Builders: Dennis & Sons

Brisbane Central State School, also known as Leichhardt Street State School, and Brisbane Practicing School, is a heritage-listed public coeducational primary school, located at 85 Rogers Street, Spring Hill, in the City of Brisbane, Queensland, Australia. Designed by architect Richard George Suter and built in 1874 by Dennis & Sons with further additions through to c. 1927, it was added to the Queensland Heritage Register on 21 October 1992, due to its historical and architectural significance. It is administered by the Department of Education, with an enrolment of 524 students and a teaching staff of 37, as of 2023. The school caters to students from Prep to Year 6, with Michael Grogan as principal.

== History ==
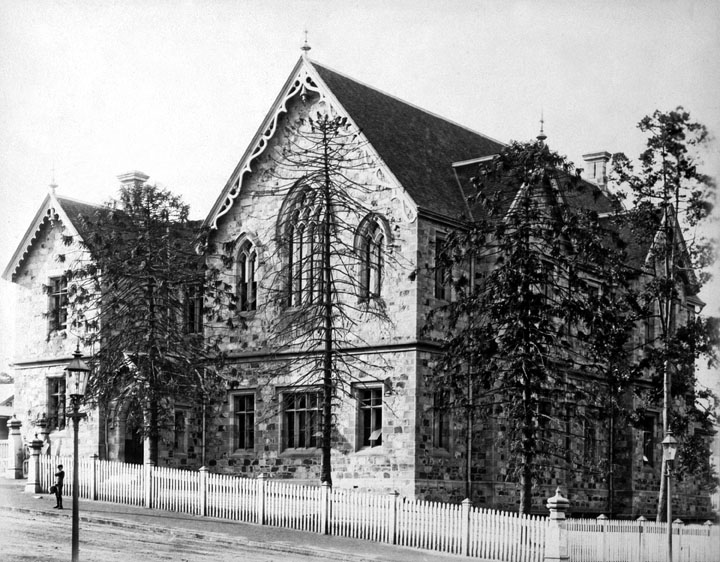
Central State School for Boys, circa 1890

Agitation for a primary school in the Spring Hill area commenced in 1873, culminating in the establishment of three separate schools - Leichhardt Street Boys' School, Leichhardt Street Girls' School, and Leichhardt Street Infants' School (later renamed Brisbane Central State School). Opening 25 January 1875 on a large site, the schools were initially accommodated in one building built in 1874. As attendance grew, other buildings were constructed, including; a playshed (1887); a high-set, timber classroom building for the boys' school (1909); a timber classroom building for the practising school (c. 1929); a brick building for the infants' school (c. 1952); as well as playgrounds, extensive cuttings, retaining walls, landscaping and plantings.

The provision of state-administered education was important to the colonial governments of Australia. In 1848 the New South Wales Government established National Schools. This was continued by the Queensland Government after the colony's creation in 1859. The Education Act 1860 established the Queensland Board of General Education and began to standardise curriculum, teacher training, and facilities. The Education Act 1875 provided a number of key initiatives for primary education; it was to be free, compulsory and secular. The Department of Public Instruction was established to administer the Act. This move standardised the provision of education and, despite difficulties, colonial educators achieved a remarkable feat in bringing basic literacy to most Queensland children by 1900.

The establishment of schools was considered an essential step in the development of early Queensland communities. The formal education of Queensland children was seen as integral to the success of a town, the colony, and the nation. Land and construction labour was often donated by the local people and schools frequently became a major focus within the community as a place symbolising progress, for social interaction, and as a source of pride. Also, the development and maintenance of schools frequently involved donations and work by teachers, parents, and pupils. Because of their significant connections with the local community, schools have occasionally incorporated other socially important elements such as war memorials and halls used for community purposes. They also typically retain a significant enduring connection with former pupils, their parents, and teachers. Social events involving a wide portion of the local community have often been held at schools, utilising the buildings and grounds – such as fetes, markets, public holiday celebrations, school break-up days, fundraisers, sporting events, reunions, and dances.

As in other Australian colonies, the Queensland Government developed standard plans for its school buildings. This helped to ensure consistency and economy. The standard designs were continually refined by government architects in response to changing needs and educational philosophy. Queensland school buildings were particularly innovative in their approach to climate control, lighting, and ventilation. Due to the standardisation of facilities, schools across the state were developed in distinctly similar ways and became complexes of typical components. These components included: the teaching buildings, the school yard, the horse paddock that was often later configured into a sports oval, and a variety of features such as sporting facilities or play equipment, shade structures, gardens and trees.

The initial school building for the Leichhardt Street schools was a low-set, one-storey, brick structure designed by established Brisbane architect Richard George Suter. Suter was a private architect commissioned from 1865 by the Board of General Education to design school buildings. After 1868, Suter was responsible for most of the Board's buildings until 1875. As an architect in the early years of the colony, Suter was prolific despite only practicing for approximately 10 years in Queensland and had a strong influence on the establishment of Queensland architecture, being credited with introducing "outside studding" construction technique to the state.

Suter's Brisbane school buildings were of brick construction. His initial designs were simple, low-set, structures with gable roofs, and rectangular in plan. In 1873 he introduced an "improved plan" adding front and rear verandahs to provide hat rooms and additional play and classroom space beginning a distinctive design solution of "classroom and verandah" that continued through evolution until at least the 1960s.

The contract to construct the Suter building for the Leichhardt Street schools was let on 5 February 1874 to builders Dennis & Sons, with a price of £1970. The T-shaped building had three large classrooms - the long front wing held two 80 by 25 feet (24.4 by 7.6 m) classrooms, one each for the boys' and girls' schools, and projecting to the rear was one 25 by 24 feet (7.6 by 7.3 m) classroom for the infants' school. The building had a symmetrical front elevation with a projecting central room 20 by 25 feet (6.1 by 7.6 m) flanked by a small teachers' room either side and a verandah along the front and rear. Enrolments by October 1875 totalled 241 boys, 176 girls, and 250 infants. In 1887 a playshed was built at the school. This was a timber-framed, open-sided shelter with a gable roof measuring 25 by 45 feet (7.6 by 13.7 m). The Queensland education system recognised the importance of play in the school curriculum and, as well as classrooms, they provided plans for playsheds, free-standing shelters that provided covered play space and were often used for unofficial teaching space when needed. They were timber-framed structures, generally open on all sides although were sometimes partially enclosed with timber boards or corrugated galvanised iron sheets. The hipped (or less frequently, gabled) roofs were clad with timber shingles or corrugated iron and they had an earth or decomposed granite floor. Fixed timber seating ran between the perimeter posts. Playsheds were a typical addition to state schools across Queensland between c. 1880s and the 1950s. They were mostly built to standard designs that ranged in size relative to student numbers. School sites were typically cleared of all vegetation and the provision of all-weather outdoor space was needed. After c. 1909 school buildings were high-set, allowing students to play in the understorey and playsheds were not frequently constructed.

In 1889 a Grand Gala Tree-planting Day was held at the Leichhardt Street schools site. Prior to this, the grounds were described as barren. The provision of outdoor play space was a result of the early and continuing commitment to play-based education, particularly in primary school. Trees and gardens were planted as part of beautification of the school. In the 1870s, schools inspector William Boyd was critical of tropical schools and amongst his recommendations was the importance of the addition of shade trees in the playground. Landscape elements were often constructed to standard designs and were intrinsic to Queensland Government education philosophies. Educationalists believed gardening and tree planting instilled in young minds the value of hard work and activity, improved classroom discipline, developed aesthetic tastes, and inspired people to stay on the land. Aesthetically designed gardens were encouraged by regional inspectors. More than 50 shade and ornamental trees supplied by the Department of Agriculture were planted in the Leichhardt Street school grounds by its scholars. It was seen as a great success and sparked the introduction of Queensland-wide Arbor Day celebrations the following year. Between 1889 and 1892 about 150 trees were planted in the school grounds.

From the school's opening, the Suter building was overcrowded and had other problems, including poor lighting and ventilation. From 1893 the Department of Public Works became responsible for school design and worked to greatly improve its standard designs to address the natural ventilation and lighting of classroom interiors. The department's architects experimented with different combinations of roof ventilators, ceiling and wall vents, larger windows, dormer windows and ducting. Roof ventilators became fleches which grew larger as the experimentation continued. Prior to the widespread adoption of electricity and artificial lighting, achieving an ideal or even adequate level of natural light in classrooms, without glare, was of critical importance to educators and consequently it became a primary determinant of the design concept and layout of all school buildings. From around 1909 windows were rearranged and enlarged to provide a greater amount of gentle, southern light into the room and desks were rearranged to have the light falling onto the students' left hand side. This reduced glare, and, since students were forcibly right-handed, did not throw a shadow onto the page. This often meant a complete transformation of the fenestration of existing buildings. Windows were larger and sills were lowered to let in more light generally. Smaller classrooms were preferred as they were easier to light correctly. Interiors became lighter and airier and met with immediate approval from educationalists.

Over time, the Leichhardt Street schools' Suter building was altered to improve lighting and ventilation of the interior to standard designs by the department. In c. 1897 skylights were added to the roof either side of the spire to aid internal lighting of the classrooms. In c. 1911 these were replaced with dormer windows, and a large arched window was added to the end (south-eastern) wall. To further improve the internal light conditions the rear verandah was removed between 1918 and 1933. The projecting infants' wing was demolished in 1933, replaced by an asphalted assembly area. Banks of casement windows were added to the rear wall to greatly increase the natural lighting and ventilation of the classrooms. This work is typical of the standard "improvements" designed by the Department of Public Works that were made to older education buildings to meet evolving education philosophies espoused by the Department of Education of over time.

Overcrowding continued at the Leichhardt Street schools and in 1909 a new high-set, timber classroom building was built to the south of the Suter building for the boys' school. This was built to a new standard design introduced in c. 1909. This high-set, timber design provided better ventilation as well as further teaching space and a covered play space underneath. This was a noticeable new direction and the high-set form became a characteristic of Queensland schools. The understorey of this new building at Leichhardt Street was enclosed between June 1922 and June 1923.

By 1914 a separate building for the Infants' School had been constructed to the northeast of the Suter building.

In 1927 the Brisbane Normal School (Adelaide Street) was closed for demolition and its teachers and students were transferred to Leichhardt Street State School. The Leichhardt Street school also took over the Normal School's role of training teachers. On 4 September 1927, the three Leichhardt Street schools operating from the site (boys', girls', and infants' schools) closed and re-opened the next day under one head teacher as the Leichhardt Street State and Practising School (unofficially known as the Central Practising School). To accommodate the large increase in pupils, teachers and trainee teachers, additional buildings and toilets were constructed at the school. One of these was a classroom building for the practising school built c. 1929 facing St Pauls Terrace. It stood on the highest part of the site, separated from the rest of the school by a tall, concrete retaining wall.

During the 1930s and 1940s, the school was known as the "Scholarship Factory" due to the high success rate of its pupils in the high school scholarship examinations. Many of its teachers and pupils became prominent identities, including Jack Pizzey and Sir Douglas Tooth.

The school was officially renamed the Brisbane Central State School in 1954. A fire damaged the north-western end of the Suter building in 1973.

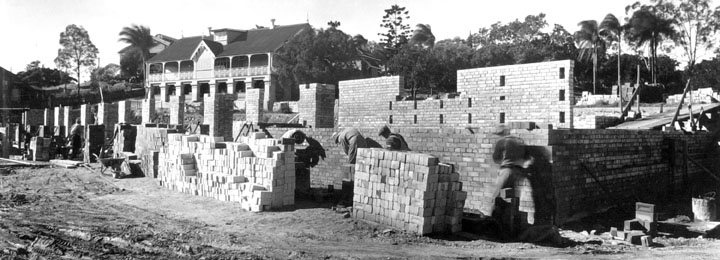
New Infants School under construction, July 1950

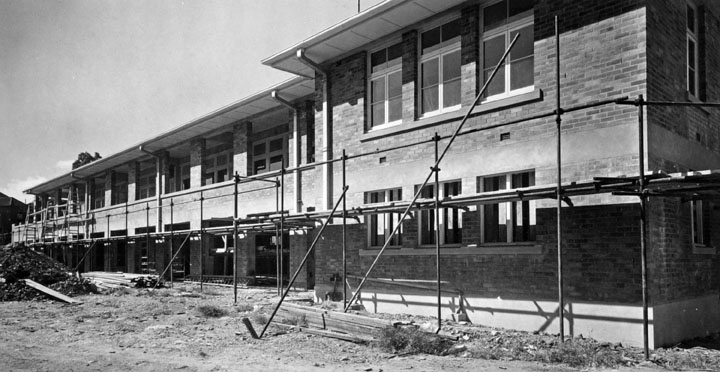
New Infants School under construction, 1st and 2nd sections, April 1951

A large, new brick infants building was constructed at the Water Street end of the site, replacing the earlier infants building. Beginning in the 1950s, school designs were altered with a goal of modernisation. Classrooms had extensive areas of windows; almost the entirety of the verandah wall and the opposite classroom wall were glazed, allowing abundant natural light and ventilation. The proliferation of stumps in the understorey was replaced with steel, timber and sometimes concrete trusses that spanned the width of the classroom and provided an unimpeded play space while minimising costs. While the majority of school buildings were built to standard plans, as in other periods, some buildings were also constructed that were individually designed. These were typically constructed in areas of stable, suburban and urban populations and were an evolution of the urban brick school buildings of the early 1900s and depression-era brick school buildings. They were generally substantial structures of brick and concrete that introduced many innovative ideas that found their way into standard plans. For example, brick was progressively used more frequently in high schools as standard. The new infants' building at Brisbane central State School was one of these non-standard designs. Designed in 1949 by the Department of Public Works, construction was completed in the financial year ending June 1952. The building included five classrooms, one kindergarten room, and an open understorey play area. It was occupied by the school until c. 1966 when use of the building was given to the Department of Health. The building was then used as the Brisbane Institute of Child Guidance, which operated as a separate entity to the school. This new use was officially opened 6 April 1966. The land around the former infants' building was subdivided off and formally transferred to the Department of Health in 1991. Remedial structural work was performed on the building at this time.

The Practising School left Brisbane Central State School c. 1959. Its building facing St Paul's Terrace was transferred to the Department of Health and used as the Children's Dental Hospital, operating separating from the school. Later, the dental hospital moved out and in c. 2008 the building was transferred back to school use. The interior was extensively refurbished in 2010 to create a single large space for assembly.

Over time, buildings and structures were added to and removed from the school grounds to accommodate different education programs or to provide new facilities. New toilets were constructed in 2004 and the c. 1929 toilets were demolished in 2012. A low-set classroom building was constructed adjacent to the rear of the Suter building in c. 2008.

Enrolments at Brisbane Central State School fluctuated from over 1000 students during the 1930s to fewer than 100 during the 1980s to 220 in 2013. In 2014, the school retains the 1874 Suter building, the 1887 playshed, the 1909 former boys' school building, the c. 1929 former practising school building, the c. 1952 former infants' school building, playgrounds, extensive cuttings, retaining walls, landscaping and mature tree plantings.

In 2014, the school is the only remaining inner-city state school and is surrounded by a mix of early Spring Hill housing and modern structures.

== Description ==
Brisbane Central State School, built on terraced terrain, comprises a number of elements, including: the Suter building (1874); a play shed (1887); the former boys' school high-set, timber classroom building (1909); the former practising school building (c. 1929); the former infants' school building (completed by June 1952); playgrounds; and extensive cuttings, retaining walls, landscaping and plantings.

The Suter building is a one-storey, low-set brick structure with a gabled roof clad with corrugated metal sheets. It faces south-west to the main entrance into the grounds on Victoria Street, and the vista of the building from the entrance is framed by trees. It is a long and narrow building aligned south-west and north-east with a timber-framed verandah along the front. The verandah is interrupted by a central, projecting gabled classroom and either side of this is an attached pair of timber-framed and -clad teaching rooms. Surmounting the centre of the roof is a square-based spire and along the ridge are timber- framed, ventilated dormer windows. The brick walls of the building stand on Brisbane tuff footings and the timber-framed portions stand on concrete posts or brick piers. The building features highly crafted, decorative brickwork including: running corbel friezes under the eaves and gable barge boards; a variety of corbelled decorations; and lancet niches. The rear (north-eastern) wall is cement rendered, scored to mimic coursed stone and has a series of timber-framed casement windows with fanlights, sheltered by timber-framed hoods. The south-eastern gable end wall has a large bricked-in arch. The layout comprises five classrooms facing north-east and one central classroom facing south-west, all accessed from the verandah. The three southern classrooms have timber-lined walls and ceiling with timber roof framing exposed within the space. The other two rooms have suspended ceilings and a masonite sheeting partition.

The playshed is a timber-framed, open-sided shelter with a gable roof supported by timber posts with brackets. The gable ends are clad with timber weatherboards. The roof is clad with corrugated metal sheets and the ceiling is lined with timber, v-jointed boards with a ventilation gap between cladding and ceiling. It has a concrete floor and perimeter seating.

The former boys' school high-set building is very intact and stands adjacent to a tall, brick-faced retaining wall on its north-eastern side. It is a timber-framed building clad with timber weatherboards and has a gable roof clad with corrugated metal sheets. It is high-set on tall brick piers and the understorey is enclosed with timber weatherboards. A timber stair on the north-western side provides access to the upper level. The upper level has a verandah on the north-eastern and south-western sides, partially enclosed on the latter by more recent sheet material and on both sides by modern steel screens. The verandah walls are single-skin with externally exposed stud framing. Between the studs are timber-framed, horizontal-pivot windows with high sills. The gable end windows are later, steel-framed louvres with original, timber-framed hoods. The upper level comprises one large classroom, accessed from both verandahs via timber, double- leaf doors with horizontal-pivot fanlights. The well-proportioned interior has a high, coved ceiling and is lined with timber, v-jointed boards. A metal tie rod between the verandah walls at cornice height is exposed within the space.

The former practising school building stands on the easternmost corner of the site and faces St Paul's Terrace to the south-east. This is a large, timber-framed building clad with timber weatherboards and has a gable roof clad with corrugated metal sheets. It is a high-set building and its understorey is enclosed. The interior layout on both levels is not original; all partitions of the upper floor are demolished to form one large space.

The former infants' school stands on the lowest part of the site near the corner of Rogers and Water Streets, separated from the main part of the school by a tall stone-faced retaining wall. Accessed from a curving driveway from Rogers Street, the long, narrow building is a two-storey, facebrick structure with a hipped, tiled roof. The area for the former infants' school is divided into two level areas by a large concrete retaining wall and the school building sits against the wall on the lower level, accessible at grade from both sides. The principal entry is from the driveway into the upper (formerly classroom) level. This entrance is emphasised by large porthole windows, a sweeping, cantilevered concrete awning and curved steps, and a set of large, bifolding, glazed, timber-framed entrance doors. A verandah, enclosed with more-recent glazing, runs along the length of the northern side and a stair at the entry and at the western end leads down to the lower level (formerly open play space). The classrooms and the understorey are subdivided by later, lightweight partitions to form offices; although the original layout is discernible. The walls between former classrooms and the verandah have been demolished. The upper level retains south-facing, timber-framed casement windows and fanlights and sheet-and-batten ceilings.

The school grounds are terraced to form levelled playing areas and feature mature ornamental trees including: camphor laurels (Cinnamomum camphora), figs, hoop pines, (Araucaria cunninghamii), palms, jacarandas (Jacaranda mimosifolia), poincianas (Poinciana regia), and eucalypts, as well as gardens and other plantings.

== Heritage listing ==
Brisbane Central State School was listed on the Queensland Heritage Register on 21 October 1992 having satisfied the following criteria.

The place is important in demonstrating the evolution or pattern of Queensland's history.

Brisbane Central School, established in 1875, is significant historically for its close association with the development of Spring Hill as an early dormitory suburb of Brisbane, and as one of the oldest extant brick schools in Queensland. It is the last remaining inner-city state school in Brisbane and is important for its historical role in Queensland teacher education.

The place is important in demonstrating the principal characteristics of a particular class of cultural places.

It is important in illustrating the principal characteristics of 1870s state school design in Queensland.

The place is important because of its aesthetic significance.

The place has an aesthetic appeal engendered principally by the early form, materials and siting of the 1870s building within grounds with mature trees and landscaping, and makes an aesthetic contribution to the historic Spring Hill townscape.

The place has a strong or special association with a particular community or cultural group for social, cultural or spiritual reasons.

It has a strong association for the Brisbane community with the evolution of Spring Hill as one of the city's most historic districts.

The place has a special association with the life or work of a particular person, group or organisation of importance in Queensland's history.

The 1874 building is an excellent example of an institutional building by Brisbane architect RG Suter, and displays a high quality of design and craftsmanship.
