= El Nido, Hamilton =

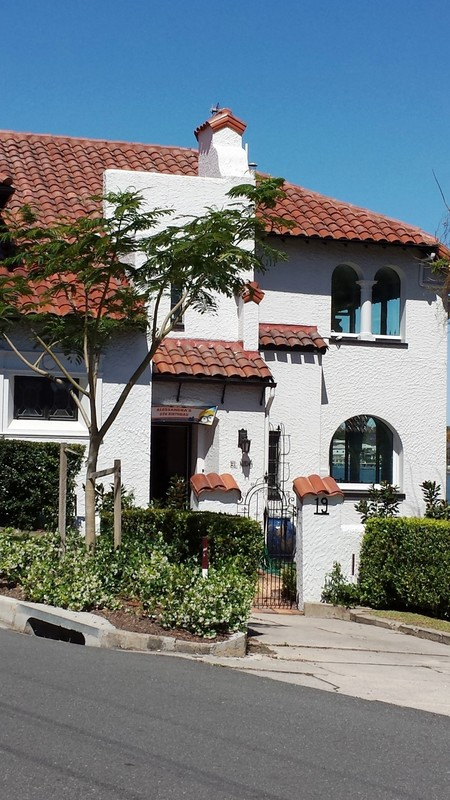
- El Nido, 2014

- Location within Queensland Location within Australia
- 27.4391°S 153.0524°E
- Location: 194 Kingsford Smith Drive, Hamilton, City of Brisbane, Queensland, Australia

History
- Design period: 1919–1930s (interwar period)
- Built: 1928–

Site notes
- Architect: Eric Percival Trewern
- Architectural style: Spanish Mission

Queensland Heritage Register
- Official name: El Nido, Cassa Anna
- Type: state heritage (built)
- Designated: 28 February 2003
- Reference no.: 602390
- Significant period: 1928 (fabric, historical)
- Significant components: air raid shelter, terracing, paving, pathway/walkway, residential accommodation – main house, steps/stairway, garage
- Builders: Burton Hollingsworth

El Nido is a heritage-listed detached house at 194 Kingsford Smith Drive, Hamilton, City of Brisbane, Queensland, Australia. It was designed by Eric Percival Trewern and built from 1928 onwards by Burton Hollingsworth. It is also known as Cassa Anna. It was added to the Queensland Heritage Register on 28 February 2003.

== History ==
Possibly originally known as Cassa Anna, this early Brisbane Spanish Mission style house was constructed c. 1928 for Mr and Mrs E. F. Powers. It was designed in 1927 by important Brisbane architect Eric Percival Trewern, who was instrumental in popularising the Spanish Mission style for domestic architecture in Brisbane. The builder was Burton Hollingsworth of Coorparoo, who constructed many of Trewern's residential designs.

The site was first alienated from the Crown in 1853/54 by William Robert Howe Weekes of Brisbane, as part of a parcel of land which comprised the whole of Hamilton Hill through to what is now Crescent Road, and down to Eagle Farm Road (later Hamilton Road, then Kingsford Smith Drive) along the Brisbane River. In the 1860s Weekes sold much of this land to Brisbane auctioneer and politician James Dickson, who erected Toorak House at the top of Hamilton Hill. By the mid-1870s Hillside Crescent had been formed, and the subdivision which was later the site of El Nido (subdivision 1 of allotment 6 of portion 1) had been created, with title held by Dickson.

In late 1878, Dickson transferred title to subdivisions 1–3 of allotment 6 of portion 1 (three blocks between Hillside Crescent and Hamilton Road) to another Brisbane auctioneer and politician, John Francis Buckland, and an adjacent two blocks, also fronting Hamilton Road, (subdivisions 4 and 5) to dentist David Ralph Eden. Braeside House, a substantial two-storeyed residence, appears to have been erected c. 1880 on subdivisions 4 and 5, and was occupied by solicitor John Robb Baxter Bruce by 1883. In the early 1890s Bruce acquired title to all five subdivisions and part of the adjacent subdivision 6. The house stood about two-thirds of the way along the site, overlooking the Brisbane River.

Braeside changed hands a number of times between 1902 and the 1920s, but remained on one title until the late 1920s. An aerial photograph of Hamilton Hill dated c. 1925 shows Braeside and its grounds very clearly. The main carriage drive led from a surveyed road (later closed) along the western boundary of subdivision 1 (near its intersection with Hillside Crescent), eastward across subdivisions 1–3 and parallel to Hillside Crescent, until it reached the house on subdivisions 4 and 5. Also evident in the photograph is a set of stairs leading south from the main carriage drive down the steep slope to another carriage drive running parallel to Hamilton Road. This second carriage drive led to two structures in the southwest corner of the estate (on subdivision 1), close to Hamilton Road, which may have been stables or garages. The stairs appear to be those still in existence at 25 Hillside Crescent, and shared by "gentleman's agreement" with the occupants of 19 Hillside Crescent, since the late 1920s.

The Braeside Estate was subdivided during the 1920s economic boom, when rising Council rates combined with the lure of attractively increasing prices obtained for inner city suburban blocks in good locations, led to the subdivision of most of the remaining large suburban estates at New Farm, Hamilton, Ascot and Clayfield. Edward Ferdinand Powers acquired title to subdivision 1 in September 1927; title to subdivision 2 was transferred in 1928, as was that to Braeside on subdivisions 4 and 5 and re-subdivision 1 of subdivision 6; and subdivision 3 was transferred in 1932, although possibly sold in 1927–28. New houses on subdivisions 1–3 were erected and occupied by 1929.

The block which Powers acquired in 1927 comprised 30.8 perches (780 m^{2}) of steeply sloping land with views over the Hamilton and Bulimba reaches of the Brisbane River, and east toward the mouth of the river. The site may also have contained the buildings associated with Braeside House, evident in the c. 1925 aerial photograph.

In mid-1927 Powers commissioned architect EP Trewern to design a substantial Spanish Mission styled residence for this site, to take advantage of the views. The design was well publicised (likely by its architect) and attracted considerable interest at the time, being heralded in the Architectural and Building Journal of Queensland of 11 July 1927 as:

"The Spanish House Introduced to Brisbane Spanish architecture is to be introduced to Brisbane in home designing. Mr EP Trewern, architect, has received from a local medico a commission to erect a residence for him of this type, and, as the location is on the Hamilton Heights, it will be seen to advantage."

A similar claim that Spanish Mission design was being introduced to Brisbane was repeated in the Daily Mail newspaper of 28 October 1927:20, which published a sketch of the principal elevations. The same sketch also appeared in the Architectural and Building Journal of Queensland of 10 November 1927:54. Of particular interest were the Cordova-style roofing tiles, manufactured by the Shannon Brick and Tile Company (of Sydney and Brisbane) and reputedly used for the first time in Brisbane.

Elements of Spanish Mission style were not new to Brisbane in 1927, having been used on picture theatre facades since the 1910s. Craigston Flats on Wickham Terrace, erected in 1927, employed elements of the Spanish Mission and/or Mediterranean styles. However, El Nido was the earliest or one of the earliest Spanish Mission style houses in Brisbane, and was designed by a prominent architect who subsequently popularised this style for domestic housing in Brisbane. Other important Spanish Mission style houses designed by Trewern include Santa Barbara at 209 Moray Street, New Farm (1929–30, cost £4,000) and 17 Griffith Street, New Farm.

EP Trewern's Brisbane architectural practice, established in 1920 and maintained until his death in 1959, proved highly successful. During the interwar years he was influential in popularising Georgian revival style in Brisbane commercial building, and Spanish Mission style in Brisbane residential architecture. He designed residences throughout Brisbane, and his interwar commercial work included business premises, flats and office renovations. His larger commissions included the Country Press Association Building at the corner of Elizabeth and Edward Streets (1924–25 - demolished); Heindorff's Building in Queen Street (1926–28 - demolished); Inchcolm Professional Chambers on Wickham Terrace (1929–30); and the new Surfers Paradise Hotel (1936–37 - demolished).

Trewern was actively involved in furthering professional architectural standards in Queensland. He served as Vice-President of the Queensland Institute of Architects 1929–30, Member Board of Architects of Queensland 1929–35, Fellow of the Royal Australian Institute of Architects 1930, President Queensland Institute of Architects 1931–35, Fellow of the Royal Institute of British Architects 1931; Vice-President of the Royal Australian Institute of Architects 1932–33, and Federal Councillor 1932–35.

Brisbane City Council building approval for El Nido was granted in November 1927. Expected to cost £3,500, the brick and stucco residence was one of the most expensive houses erected in Brisbane in the late 1920s. In 1927 Brisbane was experiencing "boom" economic conditions; even so, most houses were erected in timber, and in the financial year 1927–28, the average cost of an average 4-roomed timber house with kitchen and front and back verandahs was £558. In 1927–28 a very comfortable timber residence could be erected for between £1,000 and £1,500, and more elaborate and stylish timber homes averaged between £1500 and £2000. The 20th century construction of domestic dwellings in brick or concrete was still in its infancy in Brisbane, and El Nido was at the cutting edge of this movement. In the twelve months from November 1927 to October 1928, approvals were given for only four homes of greater cost than El Nido: a brick and stone house at Ascot to cost £4,200; two brick houses at Clayfield priced at £7,000 and £3,700 respectively, and a timber residence at Clayfield costing £4,000. El Nido and its middle class contemporaries were as close to mansion status as Brisbane generated in this era.

In February 1928 EF Powers took out a mortgage on his Hamilton Road property, which may have helped finance the construction of Cassa Anna (or El Nido), which appears to have been completed and occupied (possibly not by Powers initially) by 1929. The house and its garage, the latter accessed off Hamilton Road, figure prominently in an aerial photograph of Hamilton published in The Queenslander of 19 March 1931.

Cassa Anna was considered one of Brisbane's most beautiful homes, and was featured in the January 1933 issue of the Brisbane society publication Steering Wheel and Society and Home, reflecting the social status of its owners. It is not clear whether Powers was a medical practitioner as reported in the Architectural and Building Journal of Queensland in 1927. He appears to be the Edward F Powers who married Olive MacDermott in Sydney in 1927, suggesting that Brisbane was not their home city. They did not occupy the building for any length of time, possibly not taking up residence there until c. 1930. They undertook a world tour in 1932, during which time they lent the house to Sydney friends. Then in April 1933 title was transferred to medical practitioner Robert Graham Brown.

In January 1937 Brown transferred the property to Norman Edward Gow of Brisbane, who retained the house for nearly 20 years. Gow also appears to have leased the house to other occupants for some years, possibly even to the former owner, Dr Brown, who remains listed in the Post Office Directories as resident here until at least 1940. By at least May 1938 the house was known as El Nido (meaning "the nest" or "the home" in Spanish). It was occupied at the time by JP Ragland, consul for the United States of America, and was a focus for "society" functions in Brisbane.

During the Second World War (1939–45) a concrete air-raid shelter was erected along the northern boundary of the property.

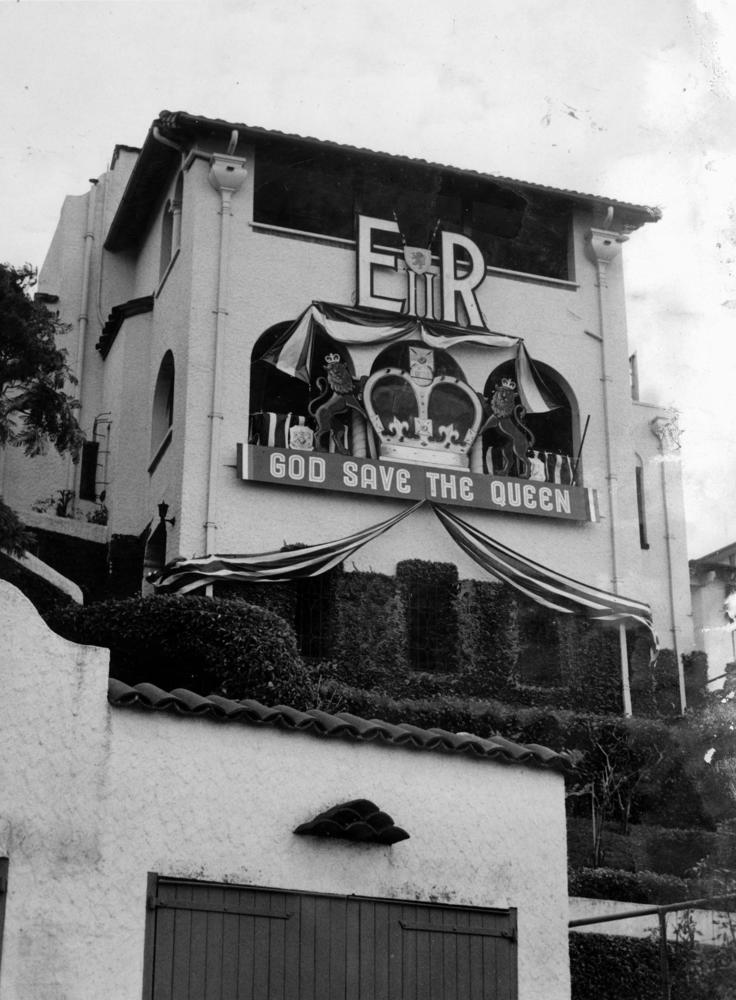
El Nido decorated for the royal visit in 1954

In honour of the royal visit of Queen Elizabeth II and the Duke of Edinburgh to Brisbane in 1954, the occupants of prominently-positioned El Nido decorated the front elevation of their house with the British Coat of Arms and the lettering "God Save the Queen". The elaborate decoration would have been seen from the river and from the Brisbane Airport approach to the city, along Hamilton Road (Kingsford Smith Drive). Between 1957 and 1975 the property changed hands three times, before sale to the present owners in 1978. It remains a private residence, and retains its views over the Brisbane River and eastward toward the river entrance.

== Description ==
El Nido is a large, Spanish Mission style residence situated prominently on the steep southern slope of Hamilton Hill, overlooking the Hamilton and Bulimba reaches of the Brisbane River, with views south/southwest across the city centre and east toward the mouth of the river. The house is accessed both from Hillside Crescent and from Kingsford Smith Drive, but sits well above Kingsford Smith Drive. It is a landmark building, seen from the river, from the Bulimba and Newstead areas, and from along Kingsford Smith Drive.

The house is a substantial, roughcast rendered brick building of two storeys with a sub-floor, taking advantage of the slope of the site. Elements of the Spanish Mission style include: a complex main hipped roof and small ancillary skillion roofs at various heights, all clad in Cordova style terracotta tiles; the use of colonnaded verandahs with semi-circular arches, barley twist columns and wrought iron balustrades; and the white roughcast exterior.

The entrance is from the western side of the building; the southern elevation, overlooking the river, is considered the "front". The originally open verandahs on the southern elevation have been enclosed with glazing, but the colonnade effect has been preserved.

Internally, the house remains substantially intact, with original timber wall panelling in the public rooms, and decorative leadlight windows throughout. Extensive views are obtained from the dining and living rooms on the eastern side of the house.

At the southern end of the block is a garage, accessed off Kingsford Smith Drive. This building is similarly designed with a Spanish Mission feel, with its roughcast rendered exterior walls and Cordova tiled roof. The grounds also contain stone terracing (which may be remnants of the Braeside garden); concrete paving and stairs, including access to the stairs at 25 Hillside Crescent; and a private air-raid shelter of concrete construction at the northern end of the block, erected during the Second World War. This structure has been rendered to resemble the finish to the house.

The concrete stairs at 25 Hillside Crescent which lead to Kingsford Smith Drive are included in the heritage register boundary, having been used as an alternative means of access to El Nido for over 70 years. The top of these stairs has been extended onto the El Nido property to facilitate this use, and there are two landings further down the slope which permit access from 19 Hillside Crescent.

== Heritage listing ==
El Nido was listed on the Queensland Heritage Register on 28 February 2003 having satisfied the following criteria.

The place is important in demonstrating the evolution or pattern of Queensland's history.

El Nido, erected in 1928, was an important and expensive house of its era, which remains important in illustrating the pattern of Brisbane suburban infill in the 1920s and 1930s, when the large suburban estates of the 1880s and 1890s were subdivided for closer density middle class housing. The extent of this infill was not rivalled until the late 20th century. The house is illustrative of the new trend toward brick construction for Brisbane's more expensive homes, a reflection of a booming economy. Its design is credited with being instrumental in popularising Spanish Mission residences in Brisbane in the interwar period, and reputedly its construction introduced the Cordova tile to Brisbane. The grounds retain the original garage, a private Second World War air-raid shelter, and early terracing. Included in the heritage register boundary is an early set of steps located on the adjacent block to the eastern of El Nido. These steps, which lead to Kingsford Smith Drive, were associated with the c. 1880 suburban villa known as Braeside, and have been shared by the residents of 19 and 25 Hillside Crescent since the late 1920s.

The place is important in demonstrating the principal characteristics of a particular class of cultural places.

El Nido is one of the earliest and best conceived of the interwar Spanish Mission style houses erected in Brisbane, important in illustrating the principal characteristics of its type: a substantial, decorative, middle-class residence designed in the Spanish Mission style to take advantage of a steeply sloping block with extensive views across Brisbane and along the Brisbane River.

The place is important because of its aesthetic significance.

Situated prominently along a major arterial road, the building was designed to be viewed and to impress. Building and grounds retain strong aesthetic value, and are significant for their landmark quality.
