= Andrew Russell Murray =

Australian orthopaedic surgeon

Andrew Russell Murray FRCSEd
- Born: 22 August 1910; Lyell, Tasmania, Australia
- Died: 1 December 1955 (aged 45); Brisbane, Australia
- Education: University of Melbourne
- Occupation: Orthopaedic surgeon
- Known for: Innovations in hand surgery

Andrew Russell Murray FRCSEd (22 August 1910 – 1 December 1955) was an Australian orthopaedic surgeon who pioneered developments in hand surgery while working at Leith Hospital, Scotland. These included pollicisation (the transfer of the index finger to replace a missing thumb), the use of stainless steel joint prostheses to replace finger joints and the use of wire to stabilise finger fractures and bone grafts. He later worked as an orthopaedic surgeon in Brisbane, Australia. On 1 December 1955 he was shot dead by Karl Kast in the "Brisbane medical massacre".

== Early life and education ==
Murray was born in Lyell, Tasmania, Australia, in 1910, the son of Russell Mervyn Murray, a mining engineer, and his wife Vivienne Murray (née Douglas). He went to school at Scotch College, Melbourne, and then studied medicine at Ormond College in the University of Melbourne. Two accidents in childhood had resulted in disabilities. His left leg had been amputated after a shooting accident. In a separate accident he sustained a permanent nerve injury of the left ulnar nerve resulting in impaired function of the hand. Despite these setbacks he became an "accomplished cricketer and ballroom dancer" at university. He graduated MB BS in 1936. During residency posts at the Alfred Hospital in Melbourne he decided to become a surgeon.

== Career in Scotland ==
Murray took a temporary post as assistant surgeon at the Royal Infirmary of Edinburgh and in 1941 he was appointed associate assistant surgeon at Leith Hospital, where he became surgeon in charge of a hand clinic. He qualified as fellow of the Royal College of Surgeons of Edinburgh (FRCSEd) in 1943. In 1946 Murray published techniques in hand surgery which, according to Hooper, had not been previously described. These included pollicisation (the transfer of the index finger on a neurovascular pedicle to replace a missing thumb), the transfer of a finger from one hand to the other, joint replacement of finger joints using stainless steel hinge joints and the use of wire to fix bone grafts in the hand. The clinic which Murray established was an early example of a specialist multidisciplinary hand clinic, incorporating physiotherapy and rehabilitation which included vocational training. Hooper considered that this was "the more remarkable for being developed by a young surgeon working in a small, busy hospital in wartime."

Morrison considered that Murray's achievements in hand surgery included three which he believed to be the first in the world. These were the first artificial joint prosthesis in hand joints, the first interosseous wiring for finger fractures and the first index finger pollicisation for thumb reconstruction, which had been previously attributed to Gosset, who had published his first paper on the topic in 1949, three years after Murray's publication on the topic.

When medical personnel returning from war service were given preference in appointment to permanent hospital posts in the UK, Murray was not appointed to a permanent post in Edinburgh and worked for a short time at the Royal Oldham Hospital, Lancashire, before returning to Australia in 1948.

== Career in Australia ==
Murray worked in Brisbane, Queensland, as orthopaedic surgeon with Arthur Meehan as his main colleague. From Brisbane Hospital he published research work on lumbar disc prolapse. His main interest remained hand surgery and he published studies on hand sepsis and carpal tunnel syndrome. He was instrumental in setting up a school of occupational therapy in Brisbane.

== The Brisbane medical massacre ==
Murray was shot dead in the "Brisbane medical massacre". Karl Kast, a naturalised Australian who was familiar with explosives, sought compensation for an alleged back injury. He had consulted six orthopaedic surgeons, none of whom supported his claim. On 1 December 1955 he made his way to the doctors' offices in Wickham House, Brisbane, armed with 30 kg (66 lb) of explosives and a .38 pistol. Here he shot Dr Michael Gallagher, wounding him in the forearm. He then made his way down Wickham Terrace to doctors' offices in Ballow Chambers where he shot dead Arthur Meehan and then Murray. Katz then detonated bombs in the office of John Lahz, before shooting himself through the head.
