= Wickham House, Spring Hill =

Wickham House
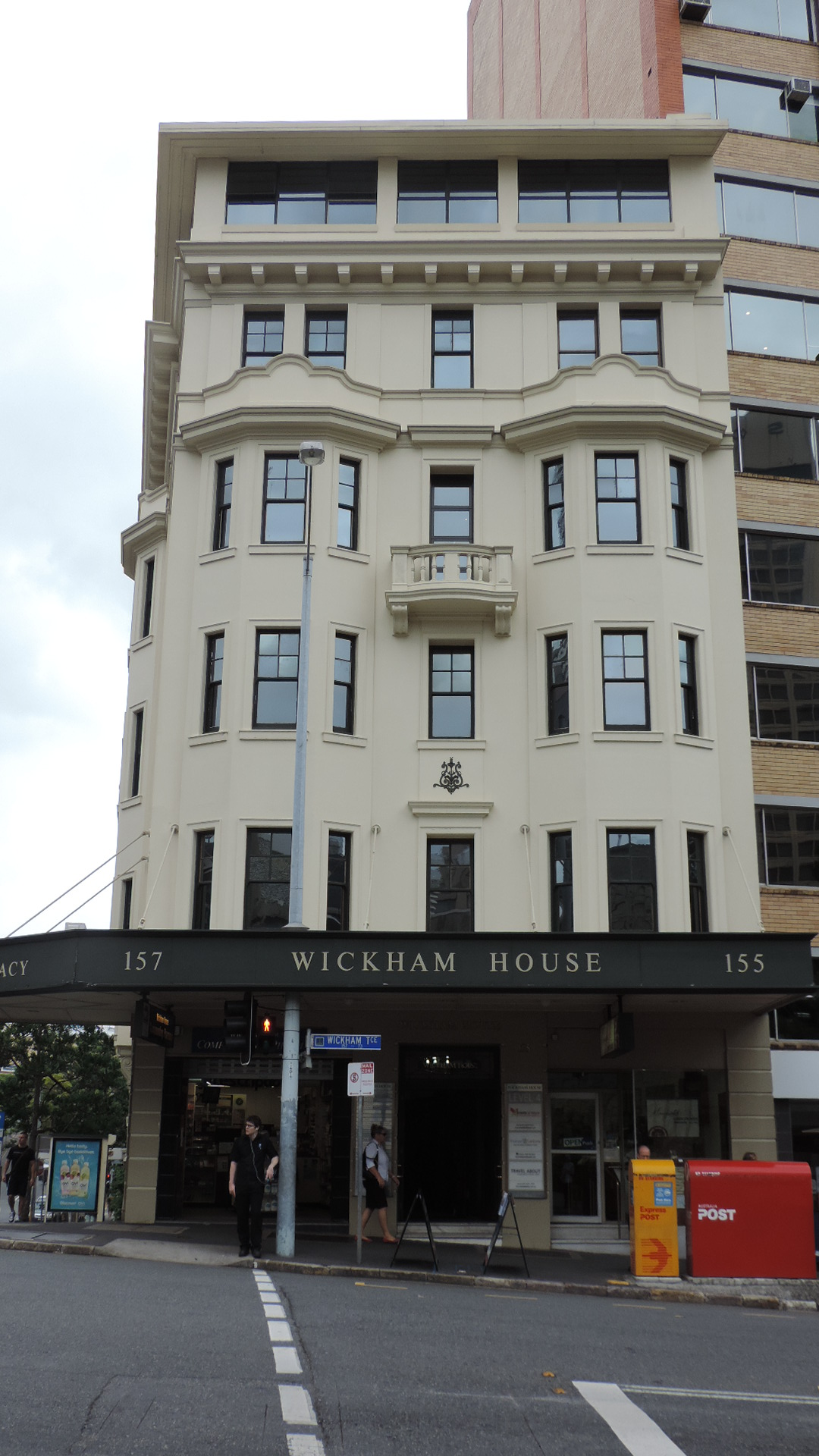
- Wickham House (as seen from Wickham Terrace), 2015

- Location within Queensland Location within Australia
- 27.4646°S 153.0251°E
- Location: 155–157 Wickham Terrace, Spring Hill, City of Brisbane, Queensland, Australia

History
- Design period: 1919–1930s (interwar period)
- Built: 1923–1924

Site notes
- Architect: Francis Richard Hall
- Architectural style: Georgian

Queensland Heritage Register
- Official name: Wickham House
- Type: state heritage (built)
- Designated: 23 June 2000
- Reference no.: 601180
- Significant period: 1924 (fabric); 1920s–1930s (historical)
- Builders: F J Corbett

Wickham House is a heritage-listed office building at 155–157 Wickham Terrace, Spring Hill, City of Brisbane, Queensland, Australia. It was designed by Francis Richard Hall and built from 1923 to 1924 by F J Corbett. It was added to the Queensland Heritage Register on 23 June 2000.

== History ==
Wickham House, a five-storey masonry building, with basement, was constructed in 1924 to a design by Francis R Hall and built by FJ Corbett.

Known as Windmill Hill to residents during the 1840s and 1850s because it was (and still is) the location of the Old Windmill) the Wickham Terrace area was subdivided during 1856 and sold to wealthy citizens. Following the first land sales along "The Terrace", also known as "The Ridge", houses began being constructed. Due to its location, close to the city and elevated, the area soon became popular for professional and business families.

Wickham Terrace was evolving into an area of boarding houses and homes, schools, clubs and medical rooms. Doctors were living and practising on Wickham Terrace as early as the 1860s. One of the first was Dr Joseph Bancroft, who occupied several houses including Athol Place, Inchcolm and Carlton House. During the 1880s, many doctors and their families moved onto Wickham Terrace, however, by the end of World War I, doctors became more specialised and starting setting up rooms on Wickham Terrace, moving their families out to the suburbs, separating their place of work from their home.

A medical entrepreneur, Dr ACF Halford, commissioned architect FR Hall to design a building for consulting rooms for medical specialists. On 6 January 1923, Hall called for tenders for the construction of "professional flats at the corner of Wickham terrace and Upper Edward street (to cost £25,000)". Built by FJ Corbett, Wickham House was opened in July 1924. Allan Oxlade was the decorator and the joinery and floor lino were supplied by James Campbell and Sons Ltd. The building was featured in the Architectural and Building Journal of Queensland on 7 July 1924:

"Brisbane is be congratulated on the enterprise of Dr ACF Halford in erecting such a modern and up-to-date suite of professional chambers known as Wickham House, just completed... on Wickham terrace... The building consists of five floors and basement, that portion facing Wickham Terrace consisting of two shops, one occupied by Mr DJ Clark (Chemist) and the other by Medical and Surgical Requisites Ltd... the main entrance... vestibule... is panelled and floored in marble with swing doors of bevelled glass..."

Wickham House was part of the interwar redevelopment of the medical precinct along Wickham Terrace, which included Brisbane Clinic (Lister House), Ballow Chambers, Inchcolm and Craigston. Their construction constituted the second phase, the first being in the 1880s, of Wickham Terrace's growth as a medical precinct. The attic roof was a later addition to the building in the 1960s.

Wickham House, together with Ballow Chambers, was the scene of a tragic occurrence in December 1955. On Thursday, 1 December 1955, Karl Kast, carrying a home-made bomb shot dead two doctors, Dr Arthur Vincent Meehan and Dr Andrew Russell Murray and wounded Dr Michael Joseph Gallagher and George Boland. A fourth doctor, Dr John Rudolph Sergius Lahz was severely traumatised due to the incident. Dr Gallahger, Kast's first victim, was shot in his offices in Wickham House. Kast then ignited three bombs in the foyer of Wickham House. George Boland, a patient of one of the doctor's in the building, attempted to stub out the bomb only to have it explode and maim his hand. Kast then went to Ballow Chambers, around hundred metres down Wickham Terrace, where he shot Dr Murray and attempted to apprehend Dr Latz, who escaped. Following his rampage, Kast locked himself in the office of Dr Lahz, within Ballow Chambers, where he shot himself and ignited another bomb. He later died in hospital. The tragedy was reported in the Courier-Mail on Friday, 2 December, as "...a horrible crime ...[that]...sent a shock of horror through the city and all Queensland".

Wickham House continues to accommodate medical specialists, maintaining the purpose for which the building was designed and constructed.

== Description ==
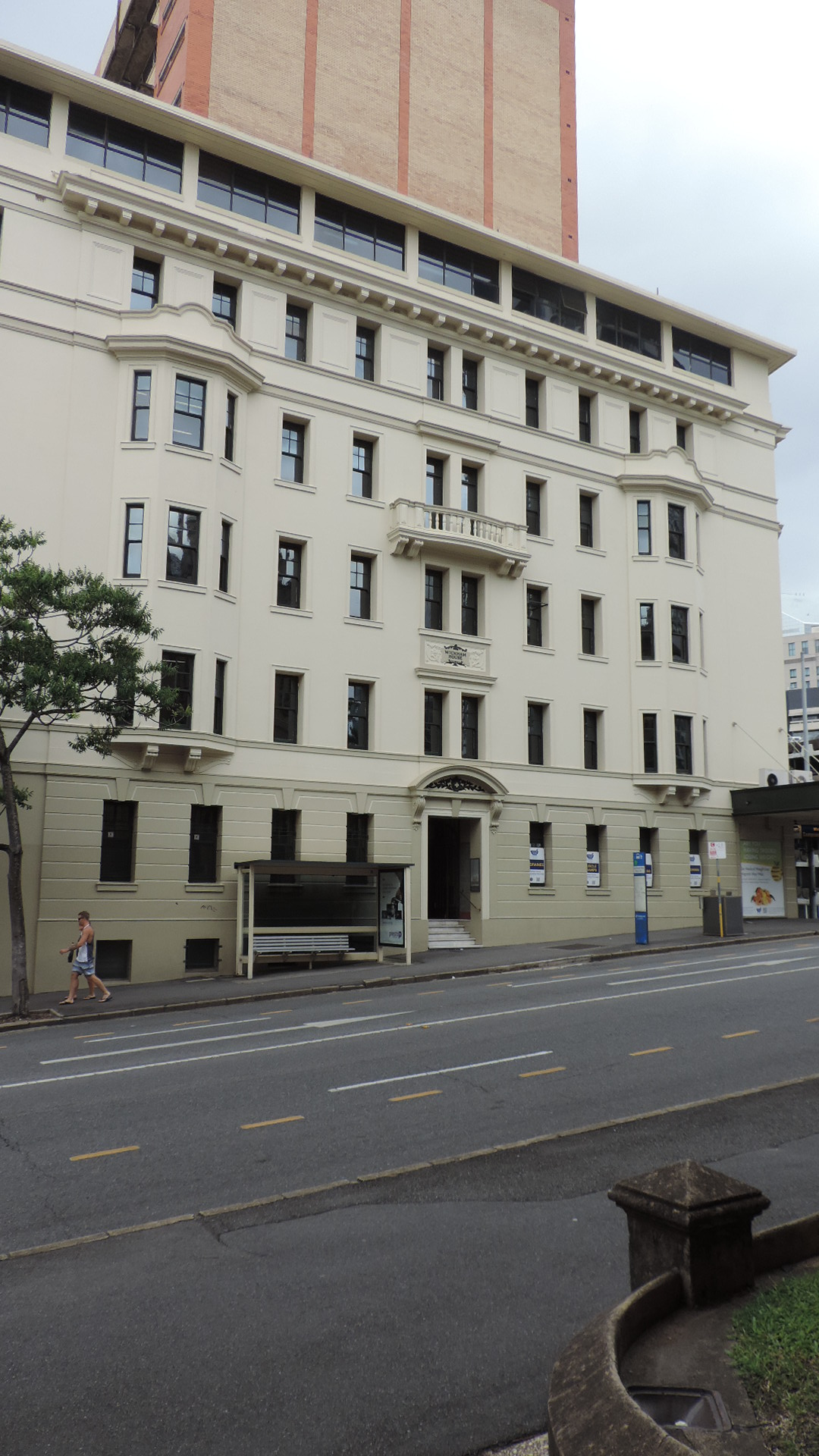
Wickham House (as seen from Upper Edward Street), 2015

Wickham House is a five-storey building, with an attic, of rendered brick with reinforced concrete floors located towards the eastern end of Wickham Terrace, overlooking the city centre. The ground floor features two shops either side of the entrance to the building on Wickham Terrace.

The Wickham Terrace facade, with three bays has restrained Georgian details including oriel windows with decorative mouldings, a centrally located balcony with rendered balustrading and brackets and moulded string course. Rectangular double hung sash windows, with multi-paned upper windows and moulded architraves, define each storey horizontally. The four upper floors of the building terminate in a projecting dentilled cornice, which does not continue right around the building.

The Upper Edward Street facade, has seven bays, defined by two oriel windows at either end of the facade and a centrally located balcony with rendered balustrading and brackets. Similarly to the Wickham Terrace facade, rectangular double hung sash windows, with multi-paned upper windows and moulded architraves, define each storey horizontally. At ground floor level, the building is rendered and scored to resemble ashlar. The row of double hung sash windows have keystone motifs. A second entrance is located in the Upper Edward Street facade. A round arched opening with large decorative brackets is located above the entrance.

Internally, the entrance foyer has a timber dado panel and timber staircase leading to the upper floors which contain medical suites. The floor is marble and the timber door has bevelled glazing.

== Heritage listing ==
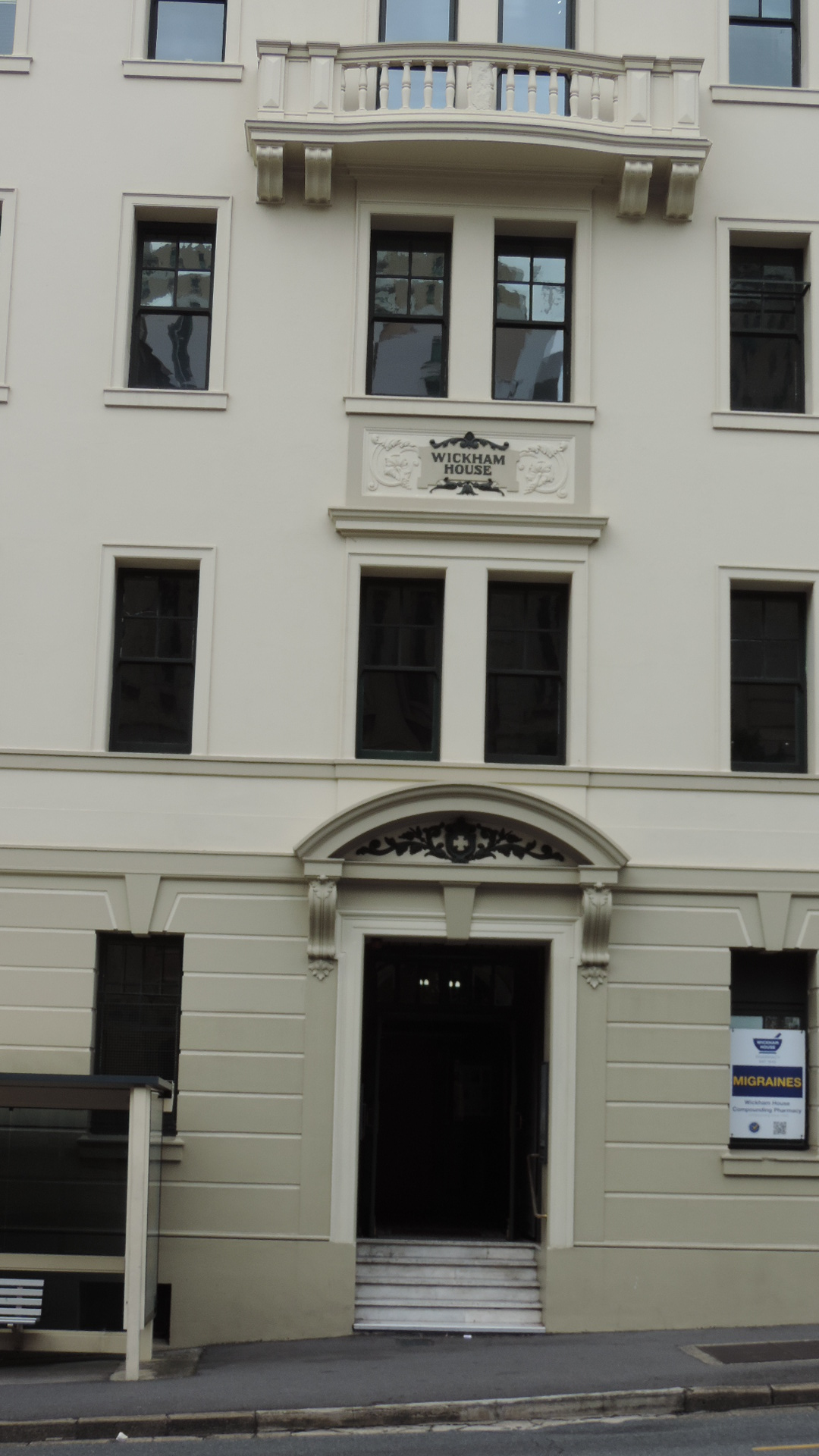
Wickham House detail (as seen from Upper Edward Street), 2015

Wickham House was listed on the Queensland Heritage Register on 23 June 2000 having satisfied the following criteria.

The place is important in demonstrating the evolution or pattern of Queensland's history.

Wickham House is important in demonstrating the interwar evolution of Wickham Terrace as an example of specialist medical rooms in Brisbane, and is associated with the development of specialist medicine in Queensland. Wickham House was part of the interwar redevelopment of the medical precinct along Wickham Terrace, which included Brisbane Clinic (Lister House), Ballow Chambers (Ballow Chambers), Inchcolm (Inchcolm, Spring Hill) and Craigston (Craigston). Their construction constituted the second phase, the first being in the 1880s, of the Terrace's growth as a medical precinct, and was indicative of new directions toward specialist medicine in Queensland in the interwar years.

The place is important in demonstrating the principal characteristics of a particular class of cultural places.

Prominently located at the corner of Wickham Terrace and Upper Edward Street, Wickham House is an accomplished and intact building which is important in demonstrating the principal characteristics of a purpose-built interwar medical office building, including in the restrained design the assertion of medical specialist prestige.

The place is important because of its aesthetic significance.

As one of a related group of classical facades, Wickham House with its neo-Georgian facade exhibits a strong contribution to the Wickham Terrace streetscape.

The place has a strong or special association with a particular community or cultural group for social, cultural or spiritual reasons.

The building has a special association with Brisbane architect Francis R Hall, as a prominent example of his work, and as a building which continues to function for the purpose for which it was designed and constructed.
