= 1955 Wickham Terrace attack =

Shooting and bombing in Brisbane, Australia

Coordinates: 27°27′53″S 153°01′30″E

On 1 December 1955, a bombing and shooting attack took place on Wickham Terrace in Brisbane, Australia. Targeting medical professionals, two people were killed and two others were injured before the perpetrator, 38-year-old Karl Kast, killed himself at the scene. Investigators determined that Kast had acted out of resentment over failed treatment for back pain by the victims.

Contemporary newspapers referred to the attack as the "Wickham Terrace Tragedy". Orthopaedic surgeon William J Cumming dubbed the attack the "Brisbane medical massacre" in a 2009 retrospective. In 2018, the Brisbane Times called the incident “terrorism”.

== Incident ==
On Thursday, 1 December 1955, Karl Kast boarded a taxi to Wickham Terrace, carrying a .38 calibre pistol and two boxes filled with 30 kg of explosives. In Wickham House, Kast entered the office of Dr Michael Joseph Gallagher, who was shot twice in the right arm and right side of the chest. After collapsing to the ground, Gallagher asked Kast why he had shot him, to which Kast replied "It is to do with spies" or "It is to do with spines" before shooting Gallagher a third time, striking his right leg. Before leaving the building, Kast placed some of the explosives in the building's foyer and set it on fire. A patient, George Boland, unsuccessfully attempted to extinguish the fire and lost several fingers when the explosives went off.

In nearby Ballow Chambers, Kast left his explosives in the waiting room and successively going to the offices of Dr Arthur Vincent Meehan and Dr Andrew R Murray, who were killed with single gunshots to the chest. Kast held a few present patients at gunpoint before he entered the office of Dr John Lahz. As Kast aimed at Lahz, two nurses and a receptionist placed themselves in the line of fire, causing Kast to relent. He instead ordered everyone to leave the room, after which Kast locked himself inside and ignited his remaining bombs. The resulting blast severely injured Kast, who then shot himself in the head with his gun. Paramedics recovered Kast alive, but he died the same day at a hospital.

In 2018, an article in the Brisbane Times called it “one of Brisbane's first acts of terrorism”.

== Perpetrator ==
Karl Kast

Siegfried Karl Kast was born on 28 March 1917 in Erding, Kingdom of Bavaria. He entered Australia on 8 July 1938, while working as a fireman on the steamship Halle, which had docked at Brisbane. Kast stated that he sought asylum due to his opposition to the Nazi government. With the beginning of World War II, Kast was initially charged with desertion and suspected of being a German spy, but charges were dropped for lack of evidence on 28 September. He was interned at several forced labour camps until March 1944, being noted for four escapes, which all ended in recapture. Upon his release, he began working as a salesman in Alice Springs and obtained Australian citizenship the same year.

On 10 August 1954, while working as a pipelayer for Cairns City Council, Kast slipped during a work detail in Earlville, falling backwards onto a pipe. He subsequently complained of back pain, for which he visited the later targeted physicians at Wickham. The doctors all stated that Kast was exaggerating his injury and possibly malingering. Cairns State Government Insurance Office denied a compensation claim, as there were reports that Kast had sustained the injury in two earlier incidents in private. Kast later told a neighbour that he would plant a bomb at the office to bring attention to his case.

== Aftermath ==
A brown paper parcel was delivered to the Brisbane Criminal Investigation Branch containing a letter from Kast claiming that he "did not receive justice elsewhere" and listing his four victims by name. The parcel also contained correspondence detailing his attempts to receive compensation for an alleged back injury.

The tragedy was reported in the Courier-Mail on Friday, 2 December, as "...a horrible crime ...[that]...sent a shock of horror through the city and all Queensland". Kast was buried in an unmarked grave at Toowong Cemetery.

== See also ==
- Luigi Mangione
