= E. P. Trewern =

- Born: 1895; Bendigo, Victoria, Australia
- Died: 1959 (aged 63–64)
- Occupation: Architect

Eric Percival "Percy" Trewern (1895–1959) was an architect who was known professionally as E. P. Trewern.

== Early life ==
Trewern was born in Bendigo, Victoria. He worked as a draftsman when he entered the Queensland Government Public Works Department. He decided to leave in 1920 and started his own architecture design firm in Brisbane, where he practiced for his entire life.

== Architectural career ==
Working during the interwar period, Trewern was involved in designing a variety of projects such as the Country Press building, Elizabeth and Edward Streets, Brisbane (1924–5), Heindorff House, Queen Street, Brisbane (1926) and Inchcolm, Wickham Terrace, Brisbane (1929). His domestic work included houses such built in the Ascot, Hamilton, Clayfield, Coorparoo and Greenslopes. He designed houses in a range of styles, including the Californian bungalow Gibson residence in Manly (1919). His Californian bungalows have features quite similar to the traditional houses of Queensland with elevated floors, pitched roofs, condensed floor plans and outdoor living and sleeping areas. The Raff residence in Clayfield (1923) and his own house at Greenslopes (1926) are good examples of designs presenting those features. Cassa Anna (later El Nido) in Hamilton (1926) and Santa Barbara in New Farm (1929) are two examples of Trewern working in the Spanish Mission style.

== Fellowships ==
- Fellow of the Royal Australian Institute of Architects (1930)
- Fellow of the Royal Institute of British Architects (1931)

== Honorary positions ==
- Vice-president of the Queensland Institute of Architects 1929–30
- Member Board of Architects of Queensland 1929–35
- President Queensland Institute of Architects 1931–35
- Vice-president of the Royal Australian Institute of Architects 1932–33 and Federal Councillor 1932–35.
