= Santa Barbara, New Farm =

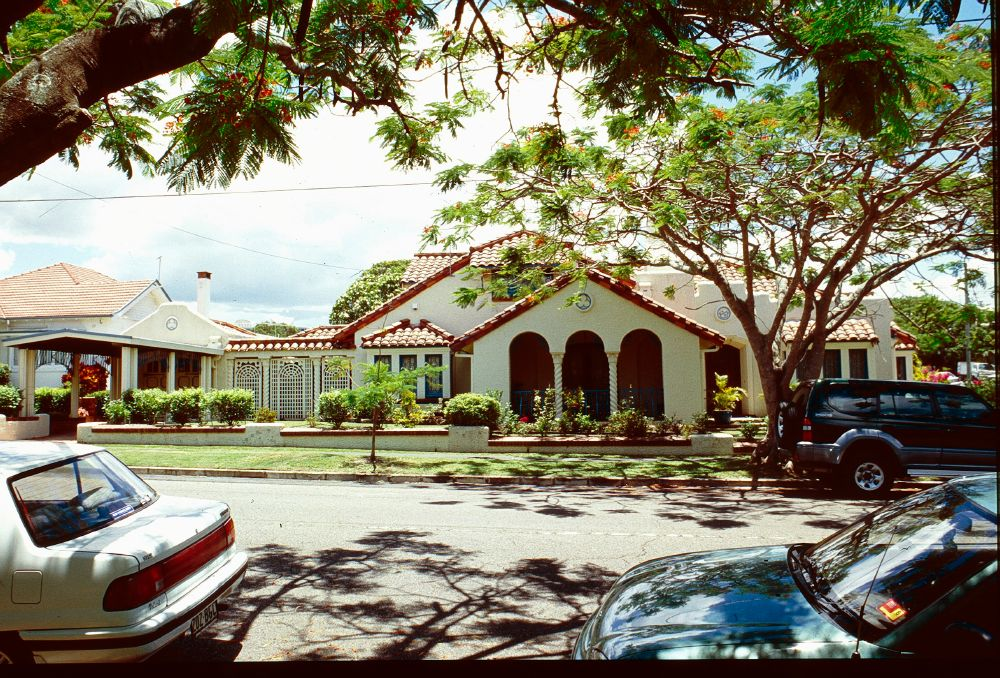
- Santa Barbara, 2008

- Location within Queensland Location within Australia
- 27.4719°S 153.0445°E
- Location: 209 Moray Street, New Farm, City of Brisbane, Queensland, Australia

History
- Design period: 1919–1930s (interwar period)
- Built: 1929–1930
- Built for: Sarah Balls

Site notes
- Architect: Eric Percival Trewern
- Architectural style: Spanish Mission

Queensland Heritage Register
- Official name: Santa Barbara
- Type: state heritage (landscape, built)
- Designated: 28 January 2000
- Reference no.: 601547
- Significant period: 1920s–1930s (fabric, historical)
- Significant components: residential accommodation – main house, trees/plantings, garden/grounds, attic, decorative features, fence/wall – perimeter, loggia/s, paving, garage
- Builders: DF Roberts

Santa Barbara is a heritage-listed villa at 209 Moray Street, New Farm, City of Brisbane, Queensland, Australia. It was designed by Eric Percival Trewern and built from 1929 to 1930 by DF Roberts. It was added to the Queensland Heritage Register on 28 January 2000.

== History ==
Santa Barbara, a rendered brick residence in the Spanish Mission style was erected in 1929–30 for Brisbane businesswoman Mrs Sarah Balls. The house was designed by Brisbane architect EP Trewern, and was constructed by builder DF Roberts.

The site was part of a much larger parcel of land – part of the New Farm of convict days – surveyed in 1843 as Eastern Suburban Allotment 19 [nearly 22 acres] and purchased in 1844 by John McConnel of Brisbane and Cressbrook. In 1863 it was transferred to, and immediately subdivided by, pastoralist and politician Robert Ramsay MacKenzie. In the 1870s Samuel Griffith acquired much of this land, including the site of Santa Barbara, on which he erected his home Merthyr.

The southwest corner of Moray and Sydney Streets remained part of the grounds of Merthyr until after the death of Sir Samuel Griffith in 1920. Early in 1929, resubdivision 37 of subdivision 17 of ESA 19, parish of North Brisbane [32 perches] was transferred from Edward Percival Thomson Griffith and George Frederick Doyle, trustees of Sir Samuel's estate, to Nola Eulis Wilkinson, the transfer being recorded in early May. In the same month, the property was transferred from Nola Wilkinson to Sarah Balls, widow.

Sarah Balls [nee Sarah Beatrix Meats Blasdale] was the widow of builder and later publican John Irwin Balls, who had immigrated from Scotland to Queensland in 1881. They were married in Brisbane in August 1881. In 1887 JI Balls went into partnership with Henry Smith as Smith and Balls, builders and contractors, Brisbane, and by 1889 had worked on warehouses for Finney, Isles & Co. and Watson Bros. (Watson Brothers Building), and the Union and Empire Hotels. It appears that the partnership did not survive the economic depression of the early 1890s, and from 1892–1896 John and Sarah Balls ran the Queensland Hotel in Terrace Street, Ipswich. In 1896 the license to the Queensland Hotel was transferred from John Irwin Balls to Sarah Balls, and she held this until 1898. John died in Western Australia in mid-1898 and the following year his widow moved to Maryborough, where she held the license to the Queen's Hotel at the corner of Adelaide and Kent Streets. However, by 1902 Sarah Balls had returned to Brisbane, where she ran the Prince of Wales Hotel in Edward St, then the Stock Exchange Hotel in Queen Street from c. 1905–c. 1915.

In the early 1900s Sarah Balls appears to have diversified her business interests, as proprietor of refreshment rooms at Isis Junction from c. 1908, and Helidon from c. 1911. In the mid-1910s she also operated refreshment rooms in Edward Street, Brisbane. In 1912–13 she erected modest brick premises in Margaret Street for Smith & Balls' Acme Engineering Works, and c. 1915 acquired an interest in the Commercial Hotel in Rockhampton. By 1917 Mrs Balls had retired from hotel work and moved to Hamilton, but appears to have maintained her business interests until her death in 1932.

In July 1929 Sarah Balls made application to the Brisbane City Council to erect a brick residence, to cost £4,000, at the corner of Moray and Sydney Streets, New Farm. Brisbane architect Eric Percival Trewern had called tenders through May and June 1929, and the contract had been let to Douglas F Roberts & Sons of Toorak Road, Hamilton.

EP Trewern's Brisbane architectural practice, established in 1920 and maintained until his death in 1959, proved highly successful. During the interwar years he was influential in popularising Georgian revival style in Brisbane commercial building and Spanish Mission and Old English/Tudor Revival style in Brisbane residential architecture. He designed residences throughout Brisbane with Santa Barbara at New Farm ranking amongst his best, and considered the finest example of Spanish Mission style in Brisbane. It was also one of the most expensive homes erected in Brisbane at this period. Trewern also designed the Spanish mission style residence at nearby 17 Griffith Street, New Farm, similar in materials and style to Santa Barbara, but on a smaller scale. Trewern's other interwar work included business premises, flats and office renovations, with some of his larger commissions including the Country Press Association Building at the corner of Elizabeth and Edward Streets (1924–25 - demolished); Heindorff's Building in Queen Street (1926–28 - demolished); Inchcolm Professional Chambers on Wickham Terrace (1929–30); and the new Surfers Paradise Hotel (1936–37 - demolished).

Trewern was actively involved in furthering professional architectural standards in Queensland. He served as Vice-President of the Queensland Institute of Architects 1929–30, Member Board of Architects of Queensland 1929–35, Fellow of the Royal Australian Institute of Architects 1930, President Queensland Institute of Architects 1931–35, Fellow of the Royal Institute of British Architects 1931; Vice-President of the Royal Australian Institute of Architects 1932–33, and Federal Councillor 1932–35.

Santa Barbara, completed by May 1930, was much admired. Described in the Architectural and Building Journal of Queensland as a handsome Brisbane residence, it was noted for its unique mission style. The Cordova tile roof, manufactured, supplied and fixed by the Brisbane branch of Wunderlich Limited, was considered impressive. The Brisbane social magazine Steering Wheel and Society & Home devoted a whole-page pictorial spread to the building in August 1933, emphasising the Mediterranean elements in the design and the sub-tropical garden setting. In 1936, a photograph of Santa Barbara was included in a newspaper article on New Farm, captioned: "This, one of the most admired homes of New Farm, combines with its settings to produce a romantic atmosphere. Here the Spanish influence in architecture has been happily employed".

Sarah Balls died on 13 June 1932, and in 1933 Santa Barbara was transferred to her daughter Eva Muriel Lissner of New Farm. Eva had married Ernest Henry Lissner, son of former Member of the Queensland Legislative Assembly Isidor Siegfried Lissner, in Brisbane in 1904, and was widowed in 1927. She resided at Santa Barbara through the 1930s, but whether she continued to live at Santa Barbara after her marriage to Francis James Wilson in 1939, is not known. Following Mrs Wilson's death in 1954, Santa Barbara passed to her son, Jack Ernest Lissner, who transferred the property to Francis Louis John Stellmack in 1956. It remained in the Stellmack family until purchased by the Wigan family in 1969.

== Description ==
Santa Barbara, a low set, rendered masonry residence is located on the corner of Moray and Sydney Streets, New Farm. It has an expansive ground floor with a centrally-placed attic room above. The house is an unusual, asymmetrical composition of intersecting forms that together create a distinctive design. It is a substantial dwelling constructed in the Spanish Mission style and employs many of the features associated with this style, including suggestions of hand-crafted techniques reminiscent of adobe buildings.

The heavy, half-round terracotta tiled roof, together with the curvaceous, bell-like chimney that sits upon a large square base are dominant features of the exterior. The principal elevation has a projecting porch with a short arcade of three arched openings, decorative metalwork and twisted, "barley sugar" columns. Bay windows are located to either side of the porch, each has a tiled roof, planter boxes supported on corbels that sit at sill level and ornamental leadlight windows in an octagonal honeycomb pattern. A loggia with twisted columns and tile capping links the house and garage and has been enclosed by decorative screens with an arch motif. The garage has been extended with an open-sided canopy with a gently pitched roof and has been paved with brick pavers. The main door is located within a wall with a stepped, asymmetric parapet and has delicate concrete moulding around the opening. Circular moulded cartouches adorn the exterior in a number of places.

Reports of the interior highlight the use of hand-made flooring tiles, panelled ceilings and walls, gently arched openings and timber-framed glass doors with decorative tracery. The central fireplace is reputedly highly decorative with twisted columns and moulded plaster surrounds.

The house is painted in a pale tone of terracotta with details such as metalwork painted in blue. The exterior of the house appears to be very intact. The setting contributes to the overall design of the house and includes a low, rendered masonry perimeter wall with brick capping, "crazy" paved paths and mature, graceful poinciana trees on the street. The name Santa Barbara is inscribed on the wall close to the entrance to the property at the corner of Sydney and Moray Streets.

== Heritage listing ==
Santa Barbara was listed on the Queensland Heritage Register on 28 January 2000 having satisfied the following criteria.

The place is important in demonstrating the evolution or pattern of Queensland's history.

Santa Barbara is significant historically for its association with the interwar redevelopment of New Farm, in which, despite the subdivision of surviving 1880s estates and the construction of many purpose-designed blocks of flats, that part of New Farm south of Brunswick Street remained as middle-class as it had been when first subdivided in the 1860s.

The place is important in demonstrating the principal characteristics of a particular class of cultural places.

Santa Barbara is important in demonstrating the principal characteristics of its type: a substantial masonry residence in the Spanish Mission style and is a key example of this genre in Brisbane.

The place is important because of its aesthetic significance.

The place exhibits aesthetic qualities which are derived from a combination of its design, form, materials, setting and intactness. It makes an important contribution to the streetscapes of Sydney and Moray streets and to the New Farm townscape.

The place has a special association with the life or work of a particular person, group or organisation of importance in Queensland's history.

The place has a special association with the work of influential Brisbane architect EP Trewern, and has been recognised as his best known residential work.
