= Ballow Chambers =

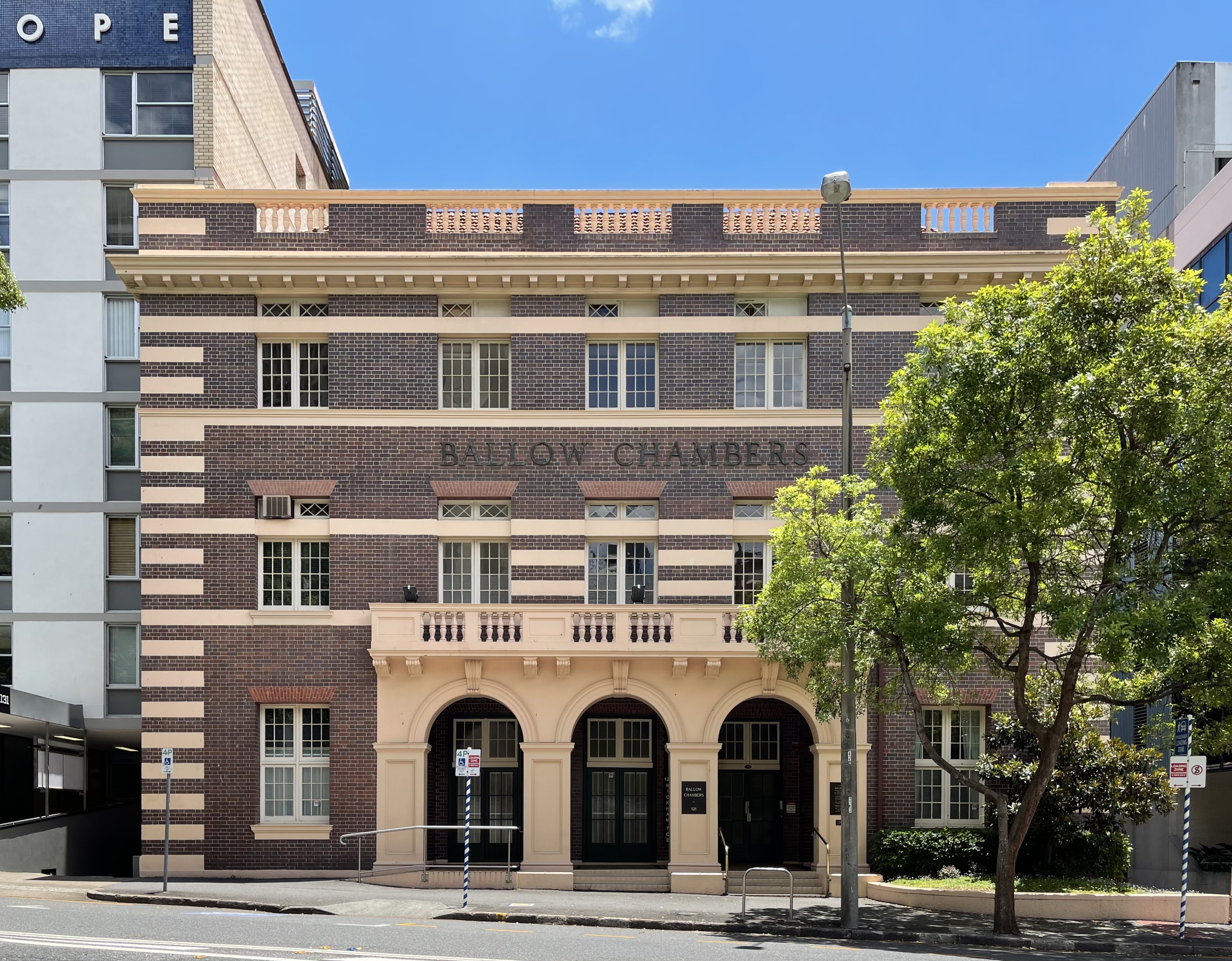
- Ballow Chambers, 2020

- Location within Queensland Location within Australia
- 27.4644°S 153.0258°E
- Location: 121 Wickham Terrace, Spring Hill, City of Brisbane, Queensland, Australia

History
- Design period: 1919–1930s (interwar period)
- Built: 1924–1926

Site notes
- Architect: Lange Leopold Powell
- Architectural style: Georgian

Queensland Heritage Register
- Official name: Ballow Chambers
- Type: state heritage (built)
- Designated: 21 October 1992
- Reference no.: 600164
- Significant period: 1924–26 (fabric); 1920s–1930s (historical)
- Builders: John Hutchinson

Ballow Chambers is a heritage-listed office building at 121 Wickham Terrace, Spring Hill, City of Brisbane, Queensland, Australia. It was designed by Lange Leopold Powell and built from 1924 to 1926 by John Hutchinson. It was added to the Queensland Heritage Register on 21 October 1992.

== History ==
This three-storeyed masonry office building was constructed in two stages, in 1924 and in 1926, for Ballow Chambers Ltd, a group of medical practitioners headed by Charles Thelander. The company acquired most of the site in 1924. Bunya Bunya Cottage, erected on the site c. 1870s, had accommodated a medical practice in the late 1880s, and from about 1900.

Brisbane architect Lange Powell was commissioned to design the new building. Powell was an established Brisbane architect, whose work includes St Martin's House (1922) and the Masonic Temple (1930), both in Ann Street, Brisbane.

Ballow Chambers was one of the earliest of the purpose-built specialist medical buildings in Brisbane. These interwar medical office redevelopments along Wickham Terrace included Wickham House (1923–24), Craigston (1927), Inchcolm (1930) and Brisbane Clinic (Lister House) (1930) . Their construction constituted the second phase (the first being in the 1880s) of Wickham Terrace's growth as a medical precinct, and was indicative of new directions toward specialist medicine in Queensland in the interwar years.

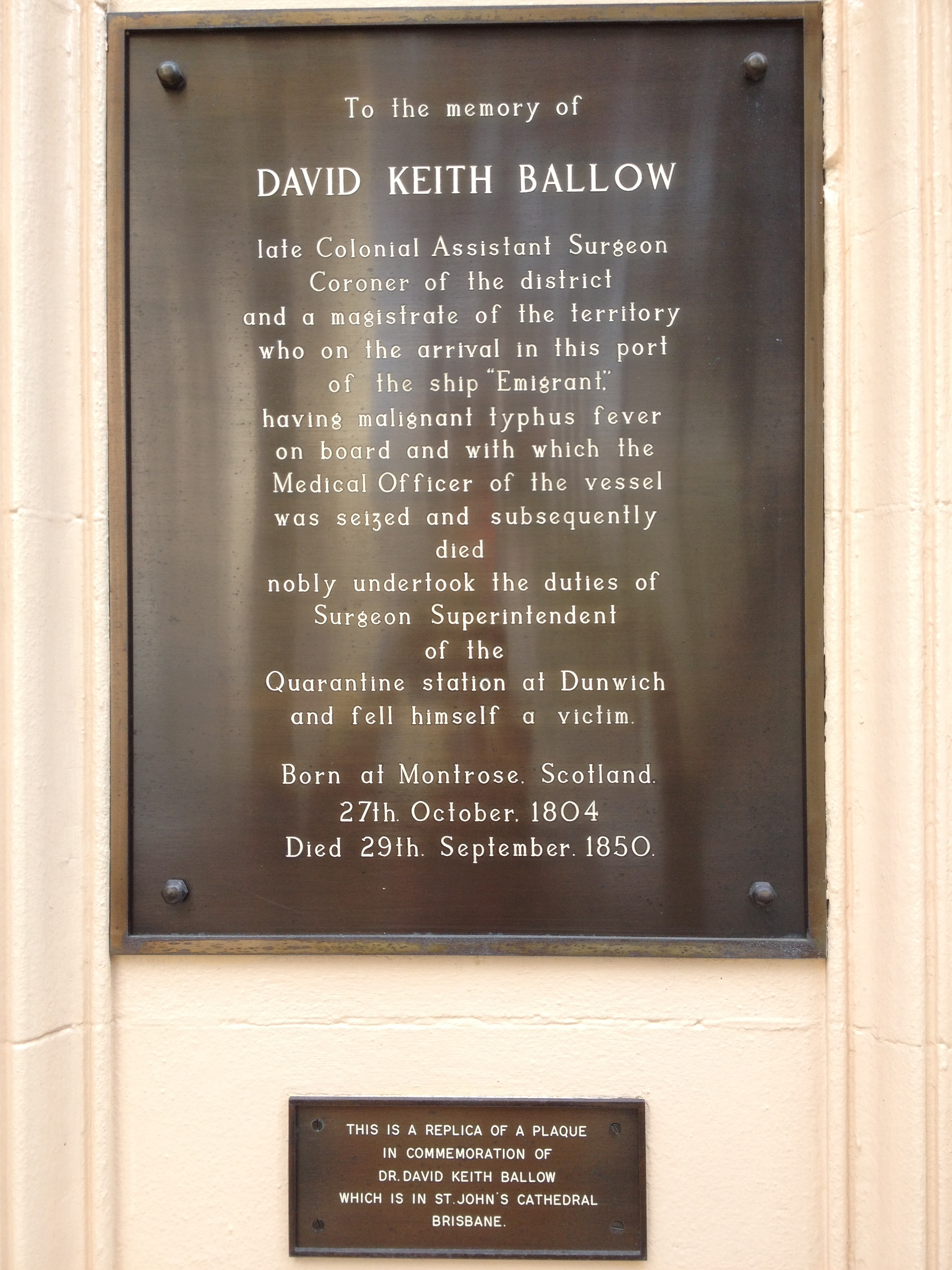
Plaque commemorating David Keith Ballow

The ground floor and sub-floor of Ballow Chambers were constructed in 1924, with a further two storeys added in 1926. John Hutchinson was the builder for both stages. The building was named after a colonial surgeon and the first doctor to establish a private practice in Brisbane, David Keith Ballow, who died of typhus fever while treating emigrants quarantined at Dunwich in 1850.

Ballow Chambers, together with Wickham House, was the scene of a tragic occurrence in December 1955. On Thursday, 1 December 1955, Karl Kast, carrying a home-made bomb shot dead two doctors, Dr Arthur Vincent Meehan and Dr Andrew Russell Murray and wounded Dr Michael Joseph Gallagher and George Boland. A fourth doctor, Dr John Rudolph Sergius Lahz was severely traumatised due to the incident. Dr Gallahger, Kast's first victim, was shot in his offices in Wickham House. Kast then ignited three bombs in the foyer of Wickham House. George Boland, a patient of one of the doctors in the building, attempted to stub out the bomb only to have it explode and maim his hand. Kast then went to Ballow Chambers, around hundred metres down Wickham Terrace, where he shot Dr Murray and attempted to apprehend Dr Lahz, who escaped. Following his rampage, Kast locked himself in the office of Dr Lahz, within Ballow Chambers, where he shot himself and ignited another bomb. He later died in hospital. The tragedy was reported in the Courier-Mail on Friday, 2 December, as "...a horrible crime ...[that]...sent a shock of horror through the city and all Queensland".

== Description ==
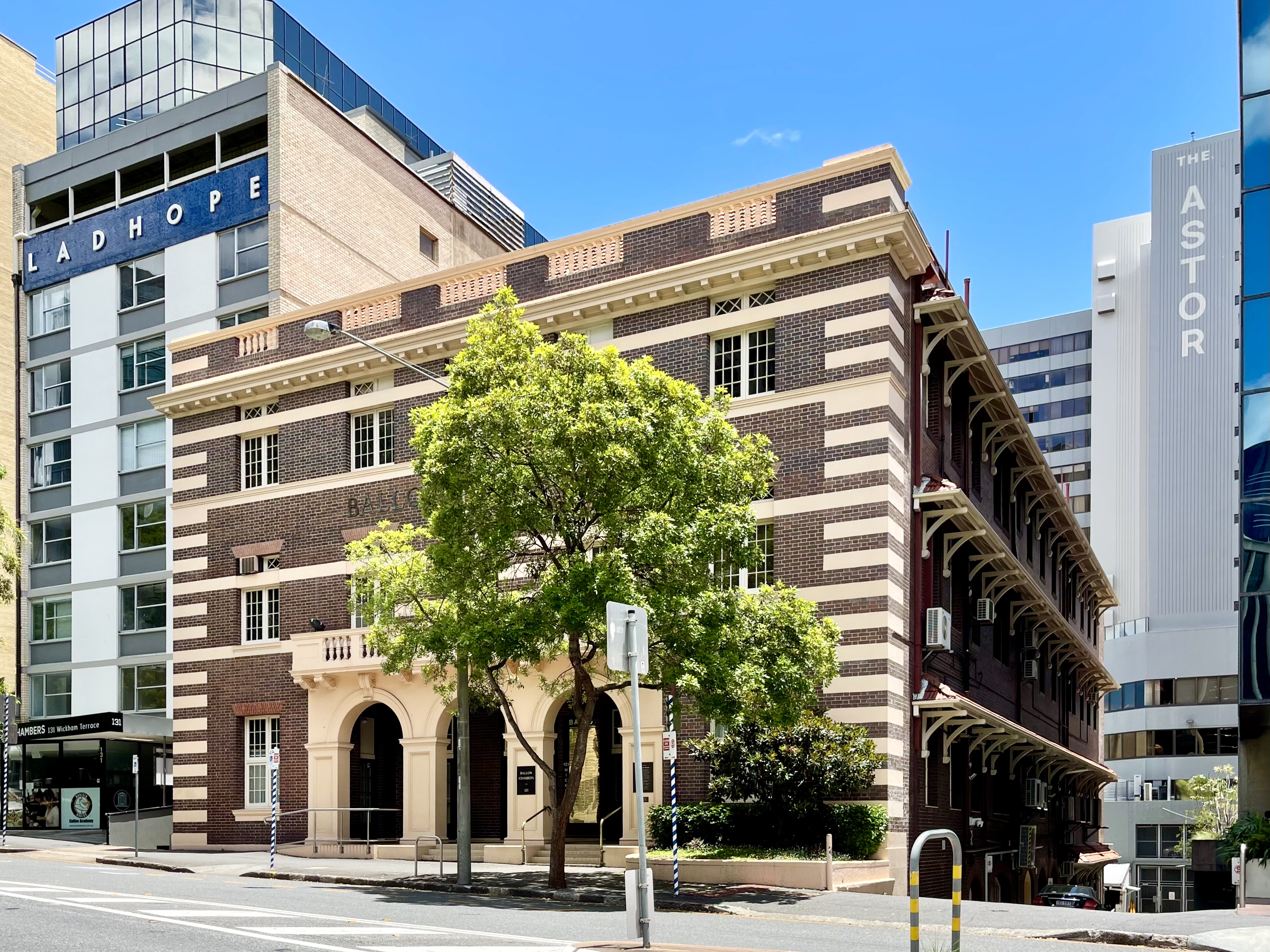
Ballow Chambers, view of northern wall, 2020

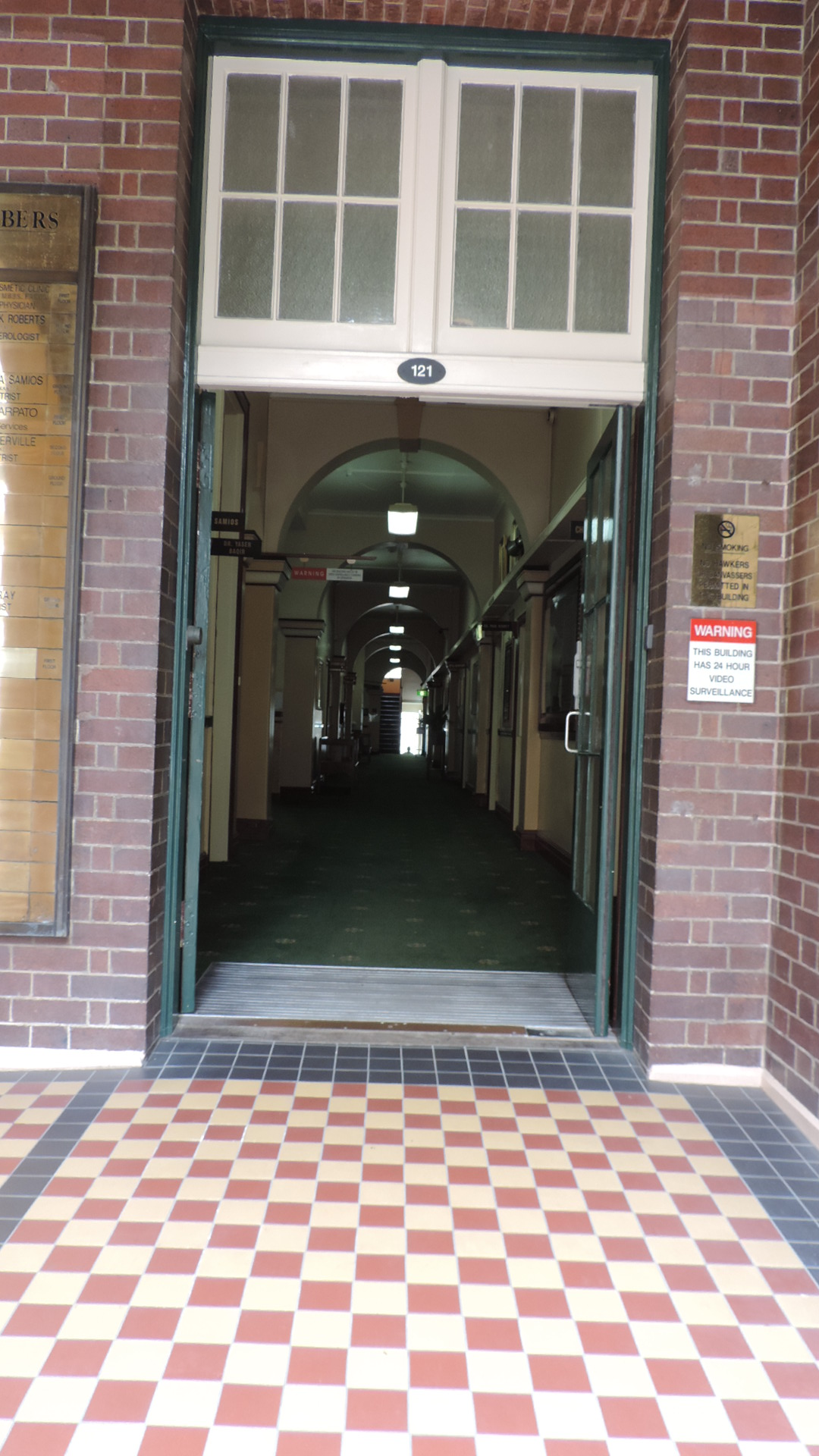
Entrance, 2015

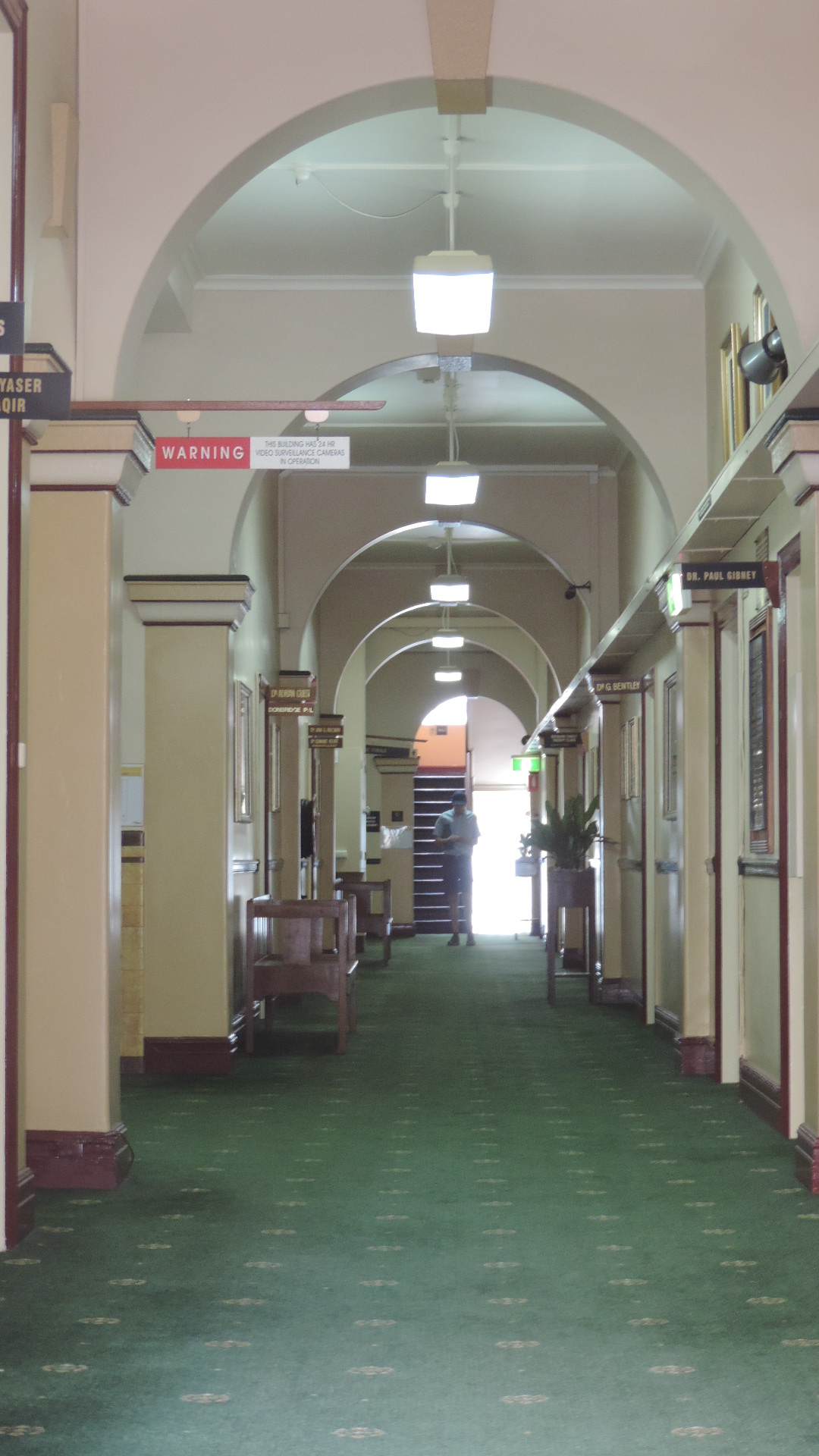
Hallway, 2015

Ballow Chambers, a three-storeyed brick building, is located towards the eastern end of Wickham Terrace, overlooking the city centre, within a precinct associated since the 1880s with Brisbane's medical profession. The street facade, with five bays, has restrained Georgian details: a central, rendered, triple-arched entry with balcony above; stucco quoins and strings; and a cornice and parapet with balustrading. Rectangular multi-paned casement windows with fanlights and metal glazing bars define each storey. Windows along the northern wall are shaded by awnings supported on large brackets.

Internally the building is divided into suites of medical offices, accessed via a hallway on each level. The ground floor corridor is particularly intact, and displays a sequence of arches, plastered walls, and timber skirting boards and dado rail (now painted). A central staircase of dark-stained, silky oak treads and handrail, with wrought iron balustrading and dado tiles, services all floors, as does the adjacent elevator. A casement window and arched fanlight with multi-paned leadlights is a prominent feature of the ground-floor stairwell.

The original configuration of suites has been retained, despite some remodelling of individual offices. The interior public spaces sustain the 1920s ambience. Ballow Chambers continues as a specialist medical office building.

== Heritage listing ==
Ballow Chambers was listed on the Queensland Heritage Register on 21 October 1992 having satisfied the following criteria.

The place is important in demonstrating the evolution or pattern of Queensland's history.

Ballow Chambers is important in demonstrating the interwar evolution of Wickham Terrace as an important medical specialist precinct in Brisbane, and is associated with the development of specialist medicine in Queensland.

The place is important in demonstrating the principal characteristics of a particular class of cultural places.

Ballow Chambers is an accomplished building which is important in demonstrating the principal characteristics of a purpose-built interwar medical office building, including in the restrained design the assertion of medical specialist prestige.

The place is important because of its aesthetic significance.

As one of a related group of classical facades, Ballow Chambers exhibits a strong aesthetic contribution to the Wickham Terrace streetscape, which is valued by the community.

The place has a special association with the life or work of a particular person, group or organisation of importance in Queensland's history.

The building has a special association with Brisbane architect Lange L Powell, as an example of his interwar work.
