= Sydney Fancourt McDonald =

Australian physician and military doctor (1885–1947)

Sydney Fancourt McDonald (1885–1947) was an Australian physician and military doctor. He was the first paediatrician within the Faculty of Medicine of the University of Queensland.

== Early life ==
Sydney Fancourt McDonald was born in Brisbane, Queensland on 18 November 1885. He was the son of a Scottish surveyor George McDonald and his wife Amelia. He was educated at Rocklea State School and Brisbane Boys Grammar School, a contemporary of John Lavarack and S.A. Roe. He won a scholarship to attend the University of Melbourne where he lived in residence at Trinity College while he studied medicine, taking his MB in 1909, BS in 1910 and MD in 1913. He was appointed to Queen's Memorial Infectious Disease and Alfred Hospitals and was assistant senior resident surgeon at the Children's Hospital from 1912 to 1914. He travelled to England in 1914 to take up postgraduate study and was a resident medical officer at Queen Charlotte's Hospital.

== Military service ==
McDonald first served in the Australian Militia Engineers in 1904. From 1910 he was an officer with the Melbourne University Rifles. He enlisted with the Royal Army Medical Corps in 1914 while he was in England and was posted to the 4th (British) General Hospital at Versailles, France. He was a conscientious teacher instructing VAD staff working in the hospitals in the basics of medical care. He served as an anaesthetist and radiographer at the hospital, and later the 33rd and 51st casualty clearing stations and 46th stationary hospital. He was mentioned in despatches in 1916.

== Return to Australia ==
Following the war McDonald worked in a number of English hospitals treating ex-servicemen suffering from post-war disorders. He completed his M.F.C.P in London in 1919. McDonald returned to Australia in 1920, taking up a position at the Repatriation Hospital in Lutwyche assisting ex-servicemen and an honorary position at the Children's Hospital in Brisbane specialising in childhood diseases and disorders. He lobbied to have lead paint removed from use in homes and backyards due to the poison risk it created for children. He treated patients with poliomyelitis. In 1927, McDonald encouraged other physicians to set up practice in Craigston, an apartment building in Brisbane which combined consultation spaces with private apartments. In 1928, he was appointed a medical consultant to the RAAF and Civil Aviation Unit in Brisbane. He was a licensed pilot and was able to give advice on pilot fatigue and aviation issues in a medical capacity. He also continued in private practice.

== World War II ==
McDonald served in New Guinea during World War II assisting with medical problems associated with tropical conditions.

== Memberships ==
- McDonald was on the council of the BMA (Queensland) 1923–1944.
- McDonald was President of the BMA Queensland in 1930.
- Chairman of Postgraduate Committee of BMA, Queensland.
- Board Member, Faculty of Medicine, University of Queensland.

== Legacy ==
McDonald's health began to fail during 1944. He died on 8 August 1947. He was survived by his second wife Jean and a large extended family. A keen photographer and film maker, his photographs, particularly of Heron Island, and other papers are held in the University of Queensland Fryer Library. A biography of McDonald entitled, The highest traditions: a biography of Sydney Fancourt McDonald was published in 1985.
