= Thumb hypoplasia =

Congenital abnormality

Thumb hypoplasia is a spectrum of congenital abnormalities of the thumb varying from small defects to complete absence of the thumb. It can be isolated, when only the thumb is affected, and in 60% of the cases it is associated with radial dysplasia (or radial club, radius dysplasia, longitudinal radial deficiency). Radial dysplasia is the condition in which the forearm bone and the soft tissues on the thumb side are underdeveloped or absent.

In an embryo the upper extremities develop from week four of the gestation. During the fifth to eighth week the thumb will further develop. In this period something goes wrong with the growth of the thumb but the exact cause of thumb hypoplasia is unknown. One out of every 100,000 live births shows thumb hypoplasia. In more than 50% of the cases both hands are affected, otherwise mainly the right hand is affected.

About 86% of the children with hypoplastic thumb have associated abnormalities. Embryological hand development occurs simultaneously with growth and development of the cardiovascular, neurologic and hematopoietic systems. Thumb hypoplasia has been described in 30 syndromes wherein those abnormalities have been seen. A syndrome is a combination of three or more abnormalities. Examples of syndromes with an hypoplastic thumb are Holt–Oram syndrome, VACTERL association and thrombocytopenia absent radius (TAR syndrome).

== Classification ==
In general there are five types of thumb hypoplasia, originally described by Muller in 1937 and improved by Blauth, Buck-Gramcko and Manske.

- Type I: the thumb is small, normal components are present but undersized. Two muscles of the thumb, the abductor pollicis brevis and opponens pollicis, are not fully developed. This type requires no surgical treatment in most cases.

- Type II is characterized by a tight web space between the thumb and index finger which restricts movement, poor thenar muscles and an unstable middle joint of the thumb metacarpophalangeal joint. This unstable thumb is best treated with reconstruction of the mentioned structures.

- Type III thumbs are subclassified into two subtypes by Manske. Both involve a less developed first metacarpal and a nearly absent thenar musculature. Type III-A has a fairly stable carpometacarpal joint and type III-B does not. The function of the thumb is poor. Children with type III are the most difficult patients to treat because there is not one specific treatment for the hypoplastic thumb. The limit between pollicization and reconstruction varies. Some surgeons have said that type IIIA is amenable to reconstruction and not type IIIB. Others say type IIIA is not suitable for reconstruction too. Based on the diagnosis the doctor has to decide what is needed to be done to obtain a more functional thumb, i.e. reconstruction or pollicization. In this group careful attention should be paid to anomalous tendons coming from the forearm (extrinsic muscles, like an aberrant long thumb flexor – flexor pollicis longus).

- Type IV is called a pouce flottant, floating thumb. This thumb has a neurovascular bundle which connects it to the skin of the hand. There's no evidence of thenar muscles and rarely functioning tendons. It has a few rudimentary bones. Children with type IV are difficult to reconstruct. This type is nearly always treated with an index finger pollicization to improve hand function.

- Type V is no thumb at all and requires pollicization.

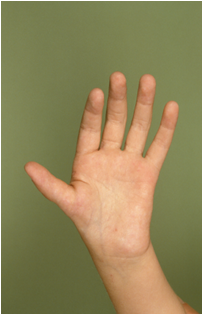
Type II

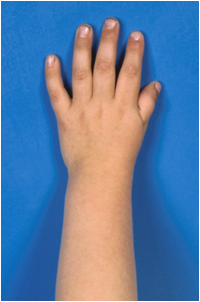
Type III-A

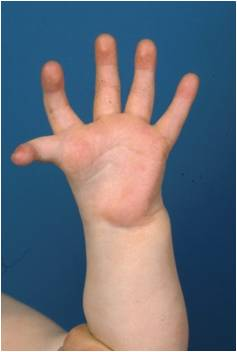
Type III-B

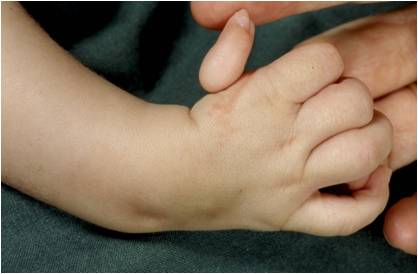
Type IV

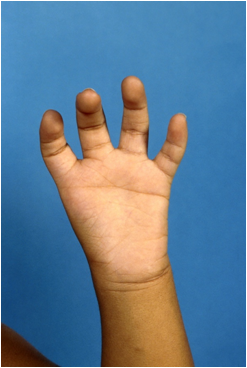
Type V

== Cause ==
The cause is unknown, and likely related to genetic abnormalities. Children with Fanconi anemia can sometimes display hypoplasia of the thumb.

== Diagnosis ==
Three main points in diagnosing thumb hypoplasia are: width of the first web space, instability of the involved joints and function of the thumb. Thorough physical examination together with anatomic verification at operation reveals all the anomalies. An X-ray of the hand and thumb in two directions is always mandatory. When the pediatrician thinks the condition is associated with some kind of syndrome other tests will be done. More subtle manifestations of types I and II may not be recognized, especially when more obvious manifestations of longitudinal radial deficiency in the opposite extremity are present. Therefore, a careful examination of both hands is important.

== Treatment ==
When it comes to treatment it is important to differentiate a thumb that needs stability, more web width and function, or a thumb that needs to be replaced by the index finger. Severe thumb hypoplasia is best treated by pollicization of the index finger. Less severe thumb hypoplasia can be reconstructed by first web space release, ligament reconstruction and muscle or tendon transfer.

It has been recommended that pollicization is performed before 12 months, but a long-term study of pollicizations performed between the age of 9 months and 16 years showed no differences in function related to age at operation.

It is important to know that every reconstruction of the thumb never gives a normal thumb, because there is always a decline of function. When a child has a good index finger, wrist and fore-arm the maximum strength of the thumb will be 50% after surgery in comparison with a normal thumb. The less developed the index finger, wrist and fore-arm is, the less strength the reconstructed thumb will have after surgery.
