= Lister House =

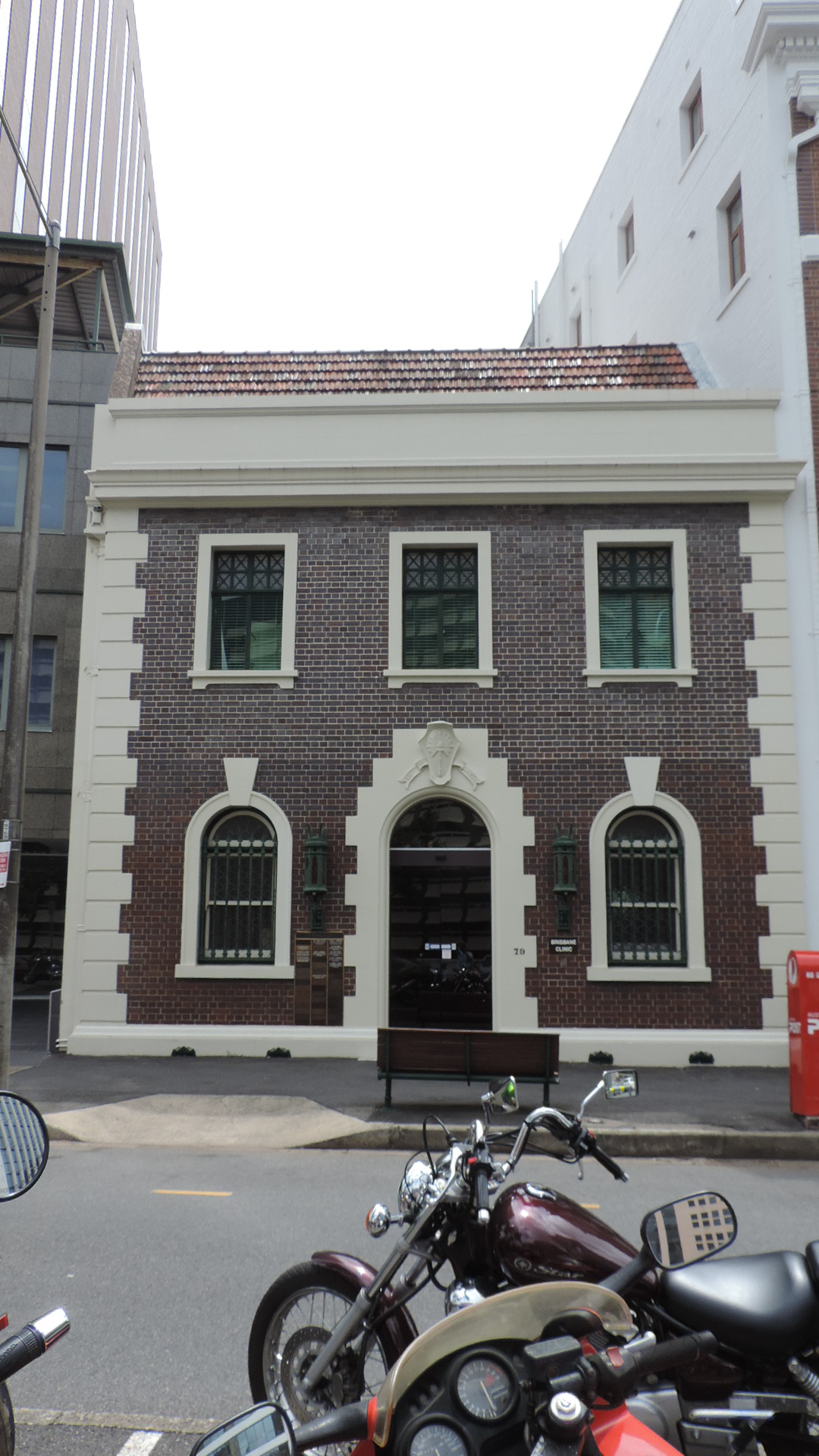
- Lister House, Wickham Terrace, 2015

- Location within Queensland Location within Australia
- 27.4643°S 153.0268°E
- Location: 79 Wickham Terrace, Spring Hill, City of Brisbane, Queensland, Australia

History
- Design period: 1919–1930s (interwar period)
- Built: 1930–1948

Site notes
- Architect: Raymond C Nowland

Queensland Heritage Register
- Official name: Lister House
- Type: state heritage (built)
- Designated: 21 October 1992
- Reference no.: 600171
- Significant period: 1930, 1948 (fabric); 1920s–1950s (historical)
- Builders: J I Green & Son

Lister House is a heritage-listed office building at 79 Wickham Terrace, Spring Hill, City of Brisbane, Queensland, Australia. It is also known as the Brisbane Clinic. It was designed by Raymond C Nowland and built from 1930 to 1948 by J I Green & Son. It was added to the Queensland Heritage Register on 21 October 1992.

== History ==
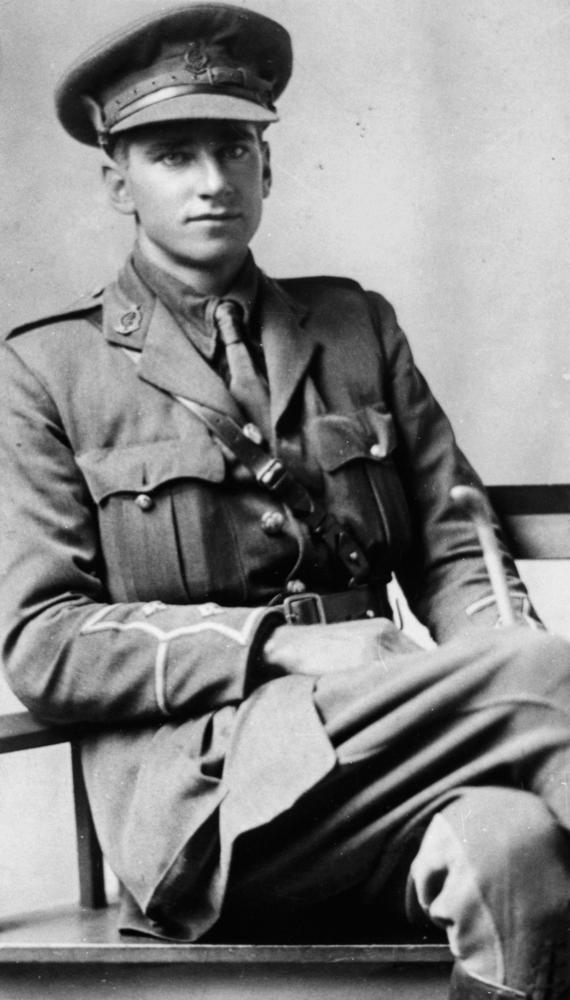
Captain Leslie Jarvis Nye

This two-storeyed masonry building was constructed in 1930 as purpose-designed medical suites for Lister House Ltd, a group of medical practitioners.

Like its neighbour Inchcolm, it is built on the site of the first Inchcolm building. In 1929 Lister House Ltd acquired the site from the Wharf Street Congregational Church (the church having decided to construct their new church on a more central site). Lister House Ltd then commissioned Brisbane architect Raymond Clare Nowland to design a building which could function along the lines of the Mayo Clinic in the United States. The contractor for the project was J I Green & Co.

Drs Leslie John Jarvis Nye, John Bostock and John Power used the American model to institute the first specialist group practice in Queensland, the Brisbane Clinic, characterised by new standards of investigation and treatment, group consultation, shared facilities, and a reading circle (until the 1950s).

Lister House was one of a number of interwar medical office redevelopments along Wickham Terrace. These included Inchcolm, Ballow Chambers, Wickham House and Craigston. Their construction constituted the second phase (the first being in the 1880s) of Wickham Terrace's growth as a medical precinct, and was indicative of new directions toward specialist medicine in Queensland in the interwar years.

In 1948 the building was extended to the rear with the addition of a second reception and stairwell area and six offices on each storey.

Some renovation of the building was undertaken in the 1980s.

== Description ==
Lister House is located towards the eastern end of Wickham Terrace, overlooking the city centre, within an area dominated by buildings accommodating medical and allied professions. It is a two-storeyed, brick building with basement.

The main arched entrance is surrounded by rendered mouldings which match the heavy render quoining to the angles of the building. Above the doorway is displayed a crest which incorporates a lighted torch, the date (1930) and the motto Lux sanant (light heals). On each side of the entrance are ornate bronze lamps of florentine design and arched windows with exaggerated keystones. Three rectangular windows with prominent mouldings distinguish the upper level. A heavy rendered cornice with a tiled roof behind completes the building.

Although built in two stages, the internal finish to the newer section mirrors that of the first. The interior features silky oak joinery, parquetry floors, rough plaster finish on the walls to picture-rail height, plaster ceilings and cornices employing a variety of decorative mouldings, and leadlighted fanlights above doorways and in the arches of the central corridor.

There are two reception and stairwell areas in the building, with the front staircase featuring silky oak treads and wrought iron balustrading.

The basement was designed specifically to accommodate an x-ray unit, and continues to be used for this purpose.

Lister House continues as a specialist medical office building.

== Heritage listing ==
Lister House was listed on the Queensland Heritage Register on 21 October 1992 having satisfied the following criteria.

The place is important in demonstrating the evolution or pattern of Queensland's history.

Lister House is important in demonstrating the interwar evolution of Wickham Terrace as an important medical specialist precinct in Brisbane, and is associated with the development of specialist medicine in Queensland

The place is important in demonstrating the principal characteristics of a particular class of cultural places.

Lister House is an accomplished and intact building which is important in demonstrating the principal characteristics of a small-scale, purpose-built interwar medical office building, including in the restrained design the assertion of medical specialist prestige.

The place is important because of its aesthetic significance.

As one of a related group of classical facades, and in particular in association with adjacent Inchcolm, Lister House with its mannered facade exhibits a strong contribution to the Wickham Terrace streetscape, which is valued by the community.

The place has a special association with the life or work of a particular person, group or organisation of importance in Queensland's history.

The building has a special association with Brisbane architect RC Nowland, as an example of his private sector work and the innovative Brisbane Clinic concept, which was modelled on the Mayo Clinic in the United States of America.
