= Craigston =

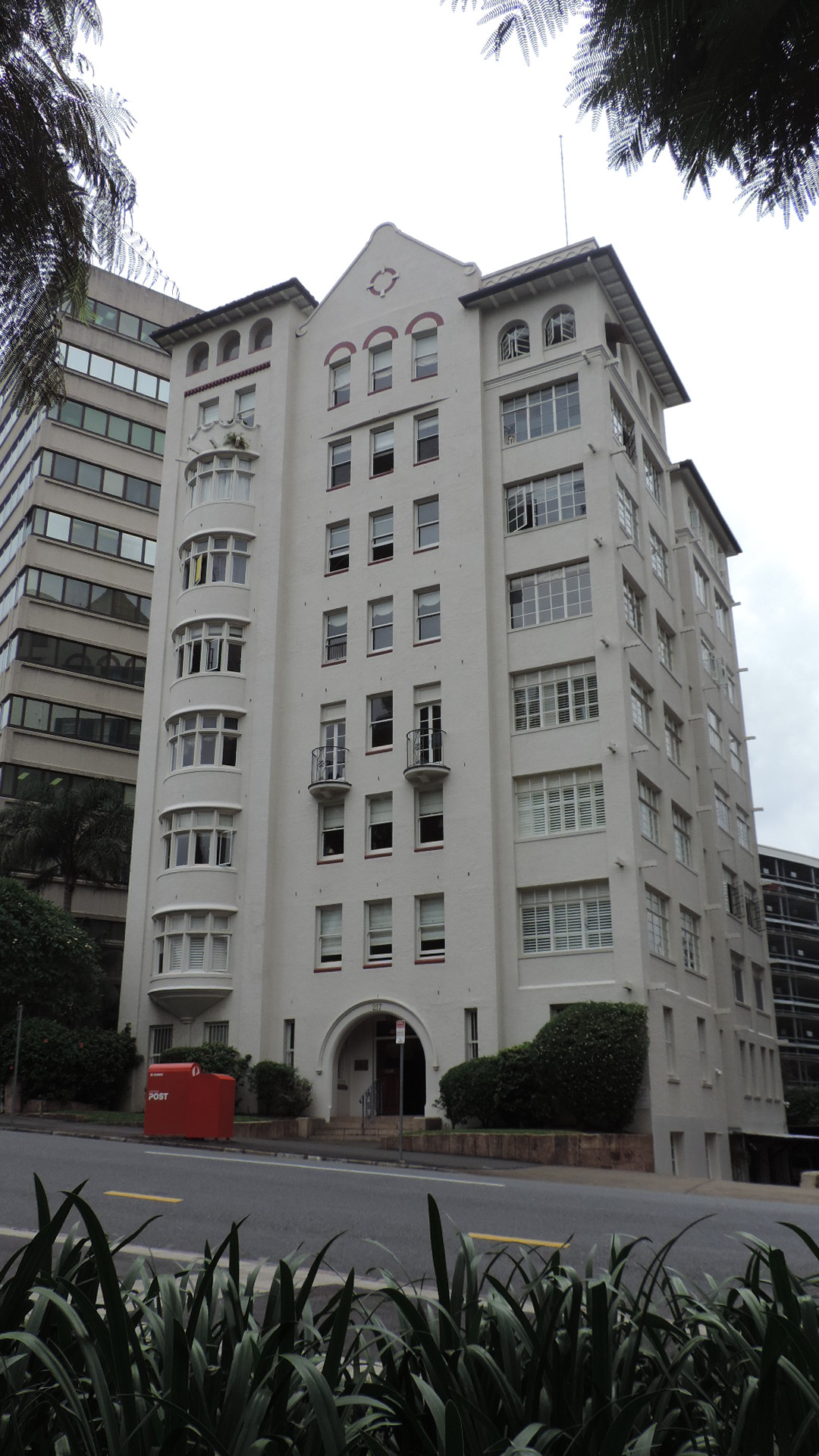
- Craigston, 2015

- Location within Queensland Location within Australia
- 27.4653°S 153.0235°E
- Location: 217 Wickham Terrace, Spring Hill, City of Brisbane, Queensland, Australia

History
- Design period: 1919–1930s (interwar period)
- Built: 1927

Site notes
- Architect: Atkinson & Conrad
- Architectural style: Spanish Mission

Queensland Heritage Register
- Official name: Craigston
- Type: state heritage (built)
- Designated: 21 October 1992
- Reference no.: 600165
- Significant components: tower – observation/lookout, garden edging/balustrades/planter boxes, garden – bed/s, basement / sub-floor, office/s, residential accommodation – flat/s, garden – roof

Craigston is a heritage-listed apartment block at 217 Wickham Terrace, Spring Hill, City of Brisbane, Queensland, Australia. It was designed by Atkinson & Conrad and built in 1927. It was added to the Queensland Heritage Register on 21 October 1992.

== History ==
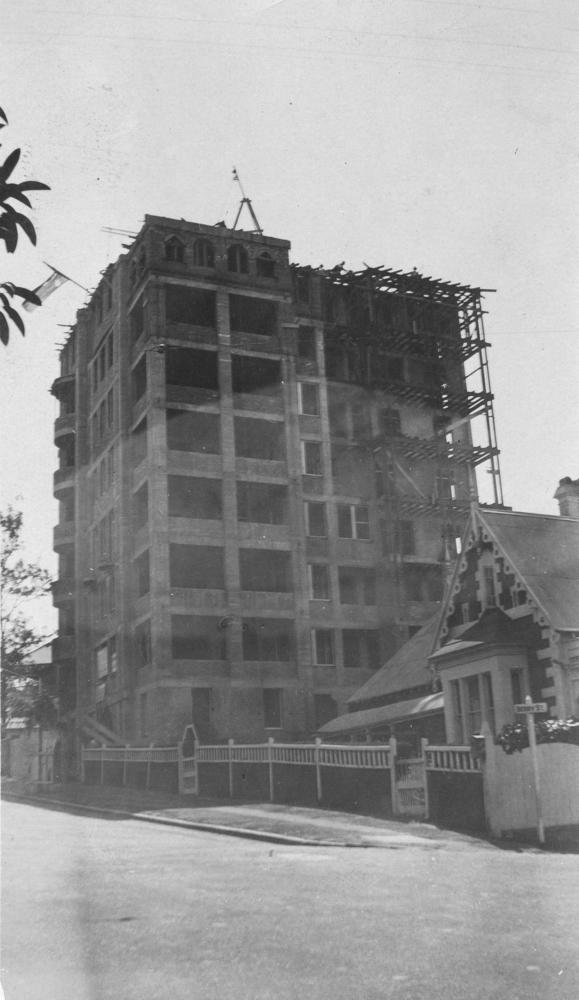
Craigston under construction, circa 1928

This eight-storeyed building was constructed in 1927 for a group of Brisbane medical practitioners.

In the mid-1920s Dr Sydney Fancourt McDonald introduced to Brisbane the concept of a multi-function office/residential block, comprising professional suites on the ground floor and residential apartments on the levels above. Craigston Ltd was formed with McDonald as chairman, and Brisbane architects Atkinson & Conrad (1918–1927) were commissioned to design the structure.

Arnold Conrad and David Wales (draftsman) worked on the design in 1926, incorporating possibly the first reinforced concrete frame in a multi-storeyed building in Brisbane. The design also demonstrated Atkinson & Conrad's interest in the Spanish Mission style, which they used in a variety of local buildings, including the Tristram Factory at West End.

The building was erected in 1927 by builder and engineer Walter Taylor, under the supervision of architect Thomas Brennan Femister Gargett. Taylor's later work included the Walter Taylor Bridge (1932–1936).

Craigston was built during the interwar redevelopment of the medical precinct along Wickham Terrace, which included Ballow Chambers, Inchcolm, Brisbane Clinic (Lister House) and Wickham House. Their construction constituted the second phase (the first being in the 1880s) of the Terrace's growth as a medical precinct.

== Description ==
Craigston is located on Wickham Terrace, overlooking the city centre, within a precinct associated since the 1880s with Brisbane's medical profession.

It is an eight-storeyed building with a sub-floor, rooftop garden, and viewing tower, and is constructed of rendered brick with a steel-reinforced concrete frame.

The design is Spanish Mission style, with an arched entry, arched windows and a decorative parapet at penthouse level, and a corner tower with a terracotta tiled roof.

Apart from a sympathetic enclosing of the balconies, the exterior of the building is intact.

Professional suites occupy the ground and sub-floors, with the remaining levels providing residential accommodation. Apart from the sixth level, which has always accommodated two apartments, each of the residential levels originally contained one spacious flat with central arrival hall, servants' rooms in the back western corner and family living in the L-shape. Most of the flats have been subdivided since, with apartments currently numbering twelve.

The block is serviced by a central elevator, dumb waiter and common L-shaped hallways, which are lined with dark-stained silky oak dado panelling. Access to the professional suites is via the front entrance, with a separate side entry (at the southwest end of the hallway) reserved for the use of residents.

Several small garden beds with edgings of Brisbane tuff have been established at the front and along the south-western side of the building.

== Heritage listing ==
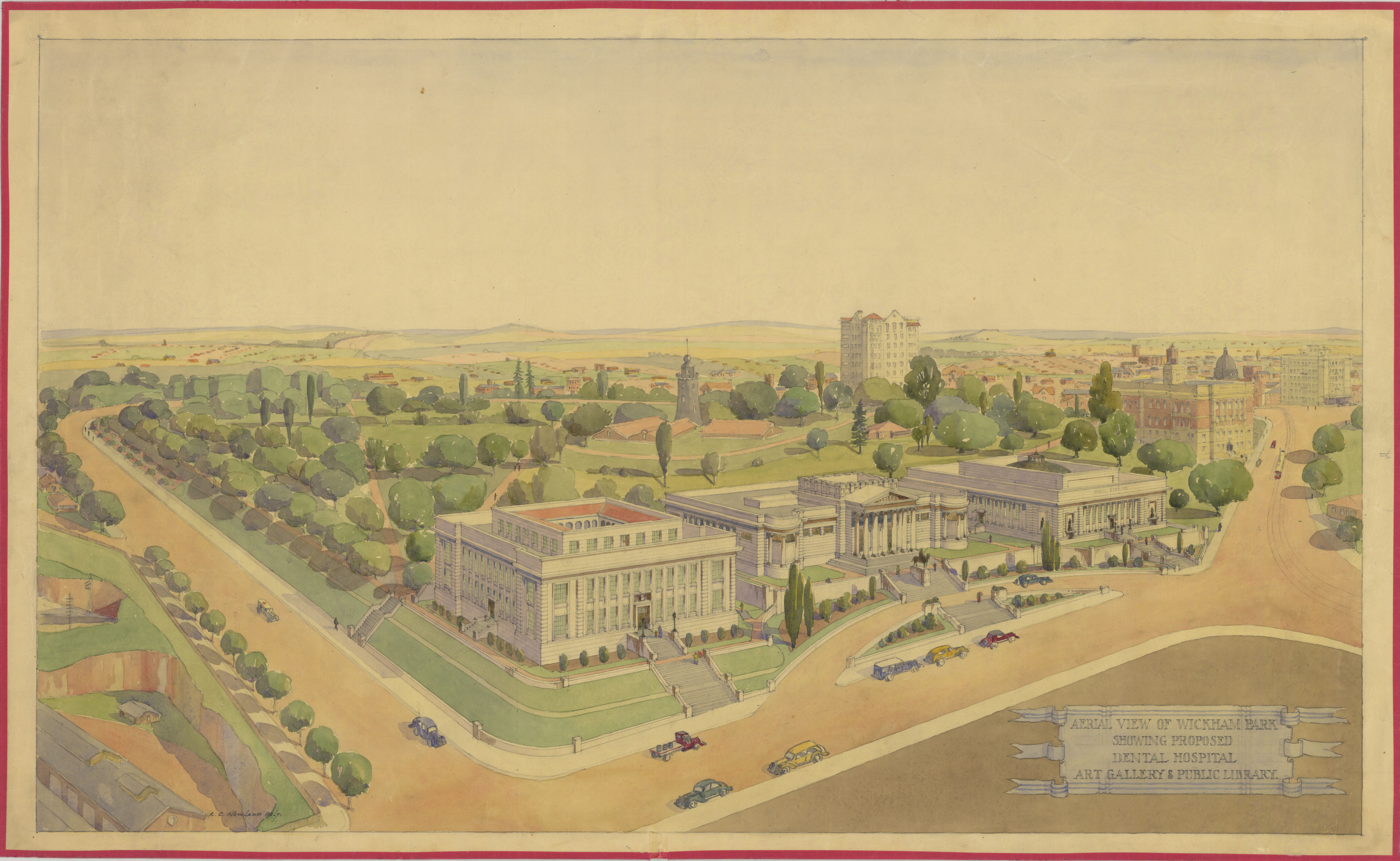
Aerial perspective view of Wickham Park show Criagston as a dominant landmark, 1938

Craigston was listed on the Queensland Heritage Register on 21 October 1992 having satisfied the following criteria.

The place is important in demonstrating the evolution or pattern of Queensland's history.

As Brisbane's first multi-storeyed apartment block, Craigston is important in demonstrating the evolution of Queensland's history, in particular of multi-storeyed developments in Brisbane.

As Brisbane's first purpose built medical office block to provide residential accommodation for its professional tenants, Craigston is important in demonstrating the pattern of Queensland's history, in particular the development of Wickham Terrace as a medical precinct.

The place is important in demonstrating the principal characteristics of a particular class of cultural places.

As a prominent Brisbane example, Craigston is important in demonstrating the principal characteristics of the application of the Spanish Mission style to a multi-storeyed building.

The place is important because of its aesthetic significance.

Craigston is important in exhibiting a range of aesthetic characteristics valued by the Brisbane community, in particular its contribution to the Wickham Terrace streetscape and the Brisbane townscape.

The place is important in demonstrating a high degree of creative or technical achievement at a particular period.

Craigston is important in demonstrating a high degree of technical achievement as possibly the first use of a reinforced concrete frame in a multi-storeyed building in Queensland.

The place has a special association with the life or work of a particular person, group or organisation of importance in Queensland's history.

Craigston has a special association with Brisbane builder and engineer Walter Taylor as a major example of his work and with Brisbane architectural firm Atkinson and Conrad as a prominent example of the firm's work, in particular their application of the Spanish Mission style.

== Notable residents ==
- Sydney Fancourt McDonald
- William N. Robertson, surgeon and Vice Chancellor of the University of Queensland
