= Pollicization =

Surgically turning an existing finger into a thumb

Pollicization (or pollicisation) is a hand surgery technique in which a thumb is created from an existing finger. Typically this consists of surgically migrating the index finger to the position of the thumb in patients who are either born without a functional thumb (most common) or in patients who have lost their thumb traumatically and are not amenable to other preferred methods of thumb reconstruction such as toe-to-hand transfers.

During pollicization the index finger metacarpal bone is cut and the finger is rotated approximately 120 to 160 degrees and replaced at the base of the hand at the usual position of the thumb. The arteries and veins are left attached. If nerves and tendons are available from the previous thumb these are attached to provide sensation and movement to the new thumb ("neopollex"). If the thumb is congenitally absent other tendons from the migrated index finger may be shortened and rerouted to provide good movement.

The presence of an opposable thumb is considered important for manipulation of most objects in the physical world. Children born without thumbs often adapt to the condition very well with few limitations, so the decision to proceed with pollicization lies with the child's parents with the recommendation of their surgeon. Persons who have grown to adulthood with functional thumbs and then lost a thumb find it highly beneficial to have a thumb reconstruction, not only from a functional but from a mental and emotional standpoint.

Other cases for pollicization are:

- Where someone is born with a hand which has five fingers, but the radialmost finger is an ordinary finger and not a thumb.
- Floating thumb: this congenital defect is a hypoplastic thumb without its metacarpal and without the muscles needed to operate it. Surgical experience shows that it is best to fillet its bones out and use its skin as spare skin to line the cleft when pollicizing the index finger.
  (Attempt to salvage a floating thumb include transferring the flexor carpi ulnaris muscle as a thumb flexor, and making a thumb metacarpal out of a metatarsal bone taken from a foot; but this leaves an inadequate thumb, and a wrist weakness, and foot damage.)
- There has been at least one case of pollicizing the little finger.
