= Athol Place =

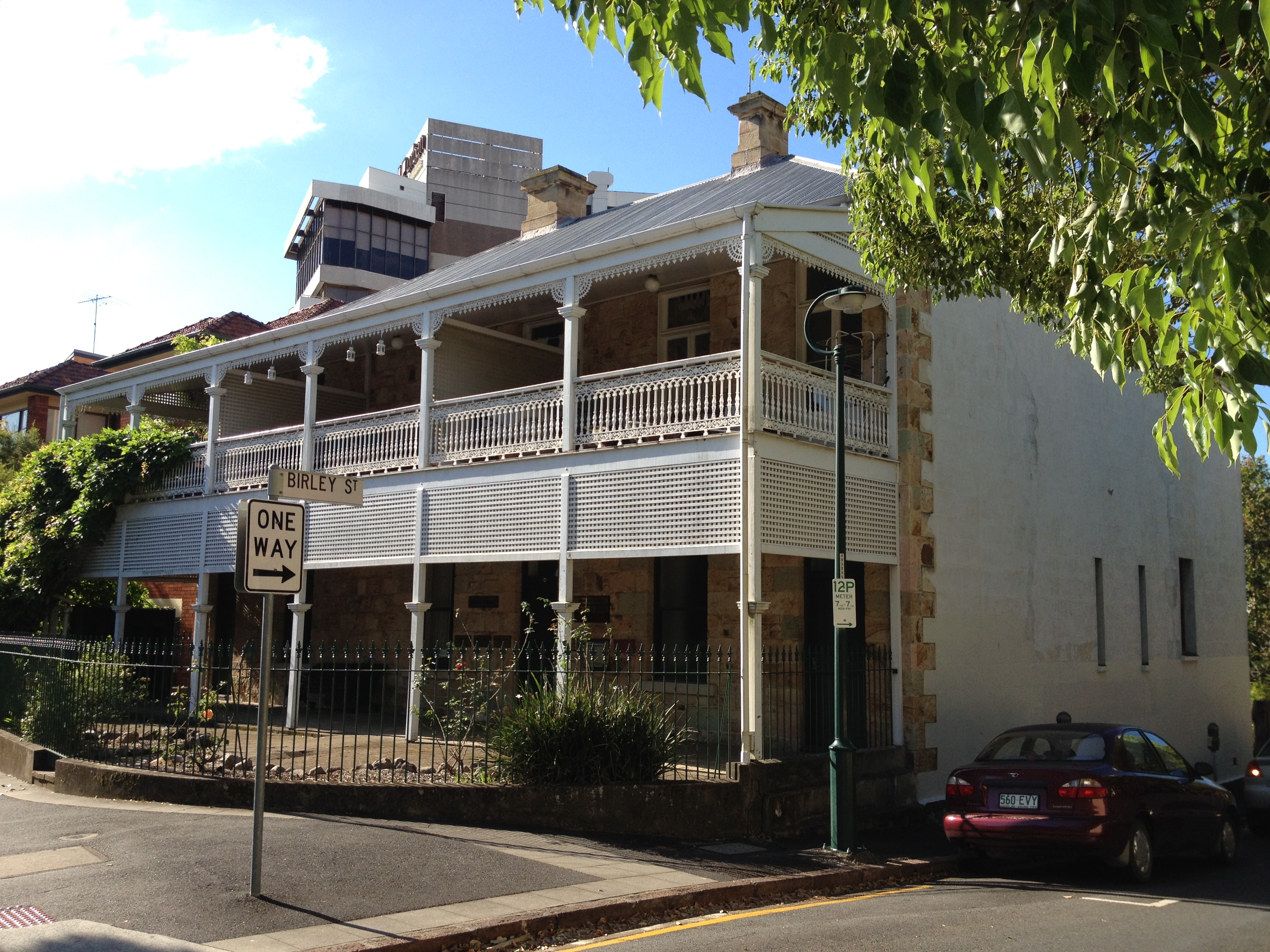
- Athol Place, 2013

- Location within Queensland Location within Australia
- 27.4646°S 153.0217°E
- Location: 307 Wickham Terrace, Spring Hill, City of Brisbane, Queensland, Australia

History
- Design period: 1840s–1860s (mid-19th century)
- Built: 1860s

Site notes
- Architectural styles: Georgian, Victorian Filigree, Queenslander

Queensland Heritage Register
- Official name: Athol Place
- Type: state heritage (built)
- Designated: 21 October 1992
- Reference no.: 600167
- Significant period: early 1860s – present
- Significant components: residential accommodation – terrace house/terrace, cellar, basement / sub-floor
- Builders: Alexander McNab

Athol Place is a heritage-listed terrace house at 307 Wickham Terrace, Spring Hill, City of Brisbane, Queensland, Australia. It was built in the 1860s by Alexander McNab. It was added to the Queensland Heritage Register on 21 October 1992.

== History ==
Athol Place was built in the early 1860s soon after Wickham Terrace was opened up for development. The block of three stone terrace houses was built by Alexander McNab, a building contractor, who retained them as rental properties. McNab lived next door in Athol Cottage which has since been demolished. Both properties were named after McNab's home town of Blair Atholl in Scotland. An early tenant was the noted physician Dr Joseph Bancroft who opened consulting rooms there in 1866, shortly after starting his Brisbane practice. Later tenants included McNab's son Alexander, who established the legal firm of Chambers McNab, and Brisbane Girls High School (now Somerville House) which used one residence as a boarding house. In 1916 the property was sold to Patrick Ryan whose family moved into one of the residences. In 1929 the Ryans moved out and converted the property into six flats. They sold Athol Place in 1972 to a firm of engineers who in turn sold it to Drs John Herron and Jon Cohen in 1979. They reinstated the exterior and refurbished the interior of the property, creating the two consulting rooms and a reception area on the ground floor and three flats upstairs.

== Description ==
Athol Place is a row of three Colonial Georgian style terrace houses. Two storey in height, it is built in Brisbane tuff with a corrugated iron roof replacing the original shingles. A timber verandah with cast-iron balustrading extends across the front of the building of the upper level. As with many of its contemporaries, the row appears as a unified building with a single hipped roof. The interior is lined with plaster except for the rear sections which are in tongue and groove timber.

The ground floor consists of a central waiting room with doors leading off on either side to doctors' consulting rooms. At the rear of each of these is an examination room which is entered through an archway. French doors open out from the reception and consulting rooms onto a hallway which runs across the width of the building. On the other side of the hall are a kitchen and offices and three stairwells leading to the flats on the first floor. These flats consist of an open kitchen and bathroom area at the top of the stairs, a wide hallway with living room on one side and two bedrooms which open out through French doors onto the front verandah.

A sub-floor is created by the fall of the land at the rear of the building forming three rooms and three cellars. Until renovation, the original layout of each terrace house consisted of two ground floor reception rooms, each with a fireplace, and a wing comprising kitchen and service-rooms at the back. A staircase on one side of the front room leads to the upstairs bedrooms.

== Heritage listing ==
Athol Place was listed on the Queensland Heritage Register on 21 October 1992 having satisfied the following criteria.

The place is important in demonstrating the evolution or pattern of Queensland's history.

Built soon after the opening up of Wickham Terrace, Athol Place is significant as one of the earliest stone terrace houses with Georgian elements built in Brisbane.

The place demonstrates rare, uncommon or endangered aspects of Queensland's cultural heritage.

It is one of the few surviving original residential buildings left along this street, and is indicative of the type of house once common when this was a residential area. Terrace houses, though numerous, were not as common in Brisbane as they were in southern capitals. The demolition of many of their number has increased the rarity of early examples still extant. As most two storey terrace houses in Brisbane were built in brick or timber, the stone construction of Athol Place increases its significance.

The place is important in demonstrating the principal characteristics of a particular class of cultural places.

The building is a fine example of its type and contributes to the streetscape of Wickham Terrace including Bryntirion on the adjacent corner of Birley Street.

The place is important because of its aesthetic significance.

The building is a fine example of its type and contributes to the streetscape of Wickham Terrace including Bryntirion on the adjacent corner of Birley Street.

The place has a special association with the life or work of a particular person, group or organisation of importance in Queensland's history.

Athol Place's significance is enhanced by its association with Alexander McNab, the successful early Brisbane developer who built and owned it for many years. This was the residence of his son Alexander, the prominent solicitor, and was at one time the surgery of Dr Joseph Bancroft, the pioneer physician.
