= Inchcolm, Spring Hill =

Inchcolm
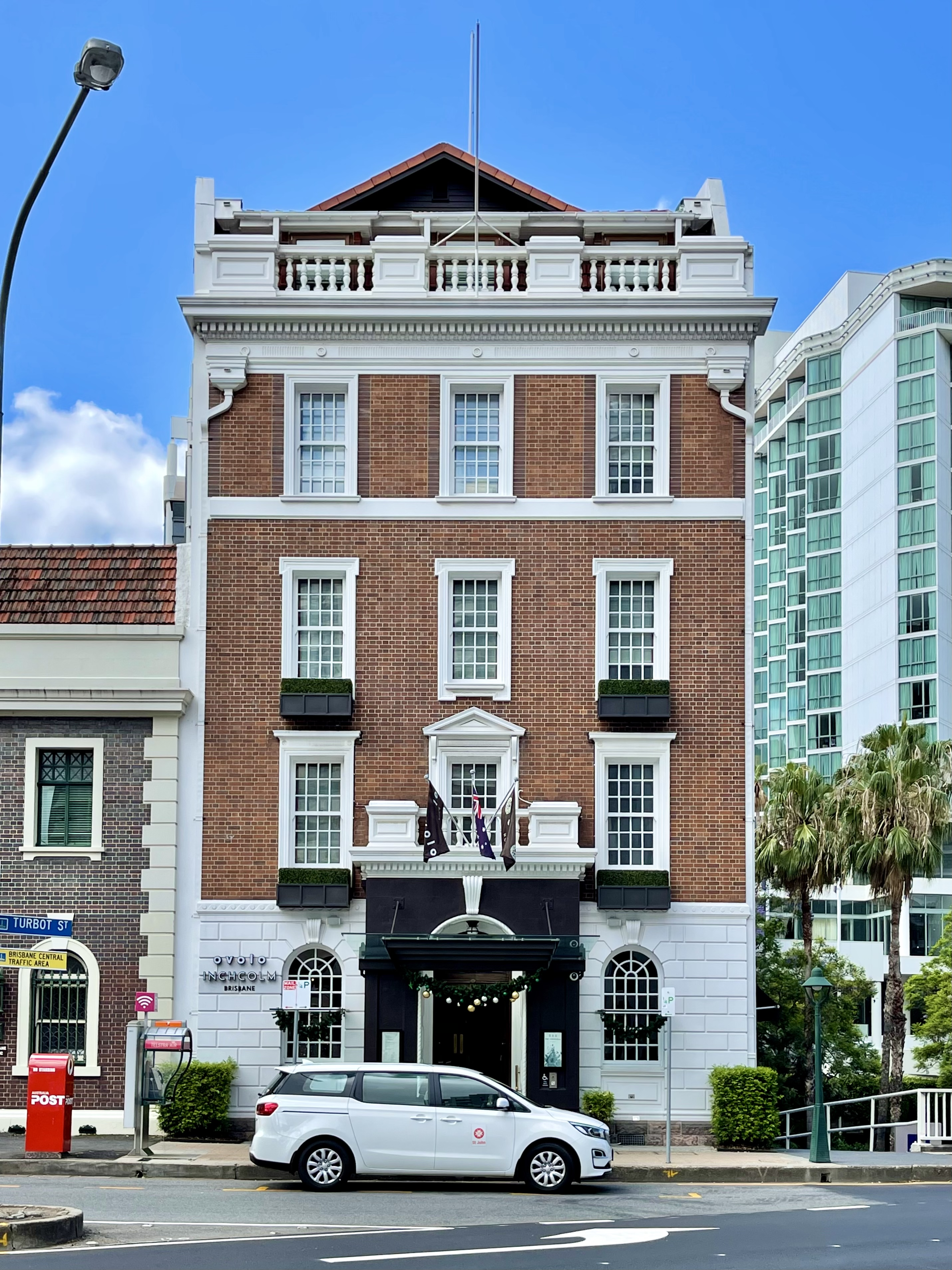
- Inchcolm, 2015

- Location within Queensland Location within Australia
- 27.4643°S 153.0269°E
- Location: 73 Wickham Terrace, Spring Hill, City of Brisbane, Queensland, Australia

History
- Design period: 1919–1930s (interwar period)
- Built: 1930

Site notes
- Architect: Eric P Trewern
- Architectural style: Georgian

Queensland Heritage Register
- Official name: Inchcolm
- Type: state heritage (built)
- Designated: 23 March 1998
- Reference no.: 600170
- Significant period: 1930 (fabric); 1920s–1930s (historical)
- Builders: J I Green & Son

Inchcolm is a heritage-listed former office building at 73 Wickham Terrace, Spring Hill, City of Brisbane, Queensland, Australia. It was designed by Eric P Trewern and built in 1930 by J I Green & Son. It was converted into a hotel in 1998, and renovated in 2014. It now trades as The Inchcolm by Ode Hotels. It was added to the Queensland Heritage Register on 23 March 1998.

== History ==
This five-storeyed masonry office building was constructed in 1930, on a site which has been associated with the medical profession since the 1880s, when the first Inchcolm was established by Dr John Thomson. This building contained both his private residence and consulting rooms, and during the 1910s and 1920s it operated as a private hospital.

The first Inchcolm was bought by the Wharf Street Congregational Church in 1925 with the intention of constructing a new church on that site. However, it was subsequently decided that the church needed a more centrally located site in the city, and so sold Inchcolm in 1929. Part of the site was purchased by Inchcolm Ltd, a group of medical practitioners initiated by George Douglas. The company commissioned Brisbane architect Eric Percival Trewern, who was influential in popularising Georgian revival style in Brisbane domestic building during the interwar years, to design a new medical office building for the site, the present Inchcolm. The other part of the site was sold to a consortium who erected the neighbouring Lister House.

Constructed by builders J I Green & Son in 1930, Inchcolm was part of the interwar redevelopment of the medical precinct along Wickham Terrace, which included Brisbane Clinic (Lister House), Ballow Chambers, Wickham House, and Craigston. Their construction constituted the second phase (the first being in the 1880s) of Wickham Terrace's growth as a medical precinct, and was indicative of new directions toward specialist medicine in Queensland in the interwar years.

Inchcolm was converted into a hotel in 1998, and was renovated in 2014. It now trades as Ovolo Inchcolm.

== Description ==
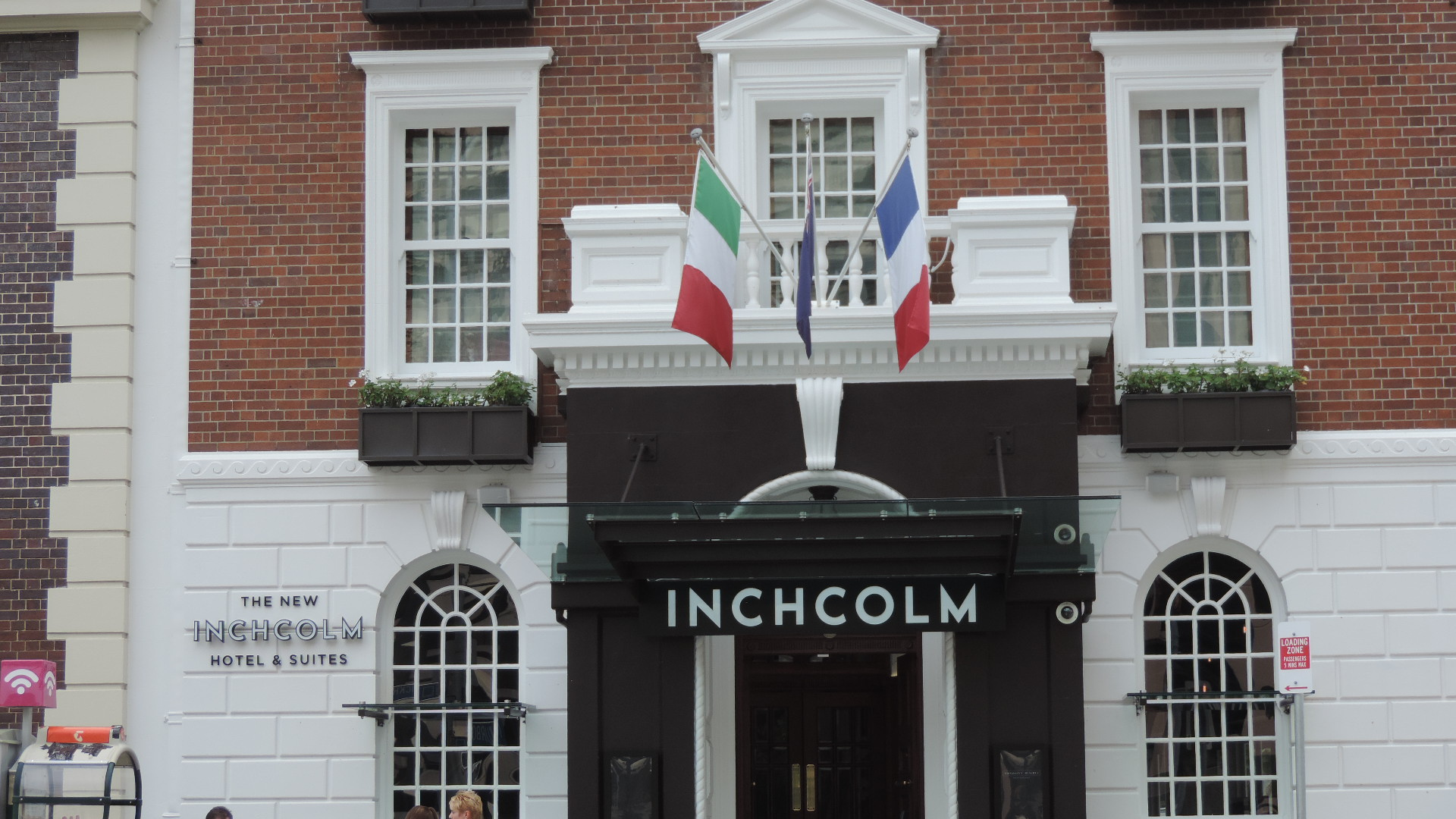
Detailing, 2015

Inchcolm is located at the eastern end of Wickham Terrace, overlooking the city centre, within an area dominated by buildings accommodating the medical and allied professions.

The building comprises four storeys to parapet level, with a basement and another floor above and behind the parapet.

The Georgian-style facade is of English bond face red brickwork, contrasted with rendered detailing. The ground floor level is rendered and scored to resemble ashlar, and the small projecting arched entrance is crowned by a cornice and parapet.

Internally the building is divided into suites of medical offices, accessed via a narrow central corridor on each level.

The ground floor lobby features entrance doors with cut bevelled glazing, dark-stained silky oak panelling to picture-rail height, plaster ceiling panels with moulded cornices, and terrazzo borders in the passageway in front of the lift, which is located in the middle of the eastern side of the building. This panelled and metal-meshed lift installation, which was designed to accommodate stretcher patients, is circled by a staircase which services all levels. The stairwell walls are rendered and pointed to resemble stone work.

Although some remodelling of individual offices has occurred, the interior public spaces remain substantially intact and sustain the ambience of a 1930s building.

== Heritage listing ==
Inchcolm was listed on the Queensland Heritage Register on 23 March 1998 having satisfied the following criteria.

The place is important in demonstrating the evolution or pattern of Queensland's history.

Inchcolm is important in demonstrating the interwar evolution of Wickham Terrace as an important medical specialist precinct in Brisbane, and is associated with the development of specialist medicine in Queensland

The place is important in demonstrating the principal characteristics of a particular class of cultural places.

Inchcolm is an accomplished and intact building which is important in demonstrating the principal characteristics of a purpose-built interwar medical office building, including in the restrained design the assertion of medical specialist prestige

The place is important because of its aesthetic significance.

As one of a related group of classical facades, and in particular in association with adjacent Lister House, Inchcolm with its neo-Georgian facade exhibits a strong contribution to the Wickham Terrace streetscape, which is valued by the community

The place has a special association with the life or work of a particular person, group or organisation of importance in Queensland's history.

The building has a special association with Brisbane architect EP Trewern, as an example of his work
