= Wickham Terrace =

Street in Brisbane, Queensland

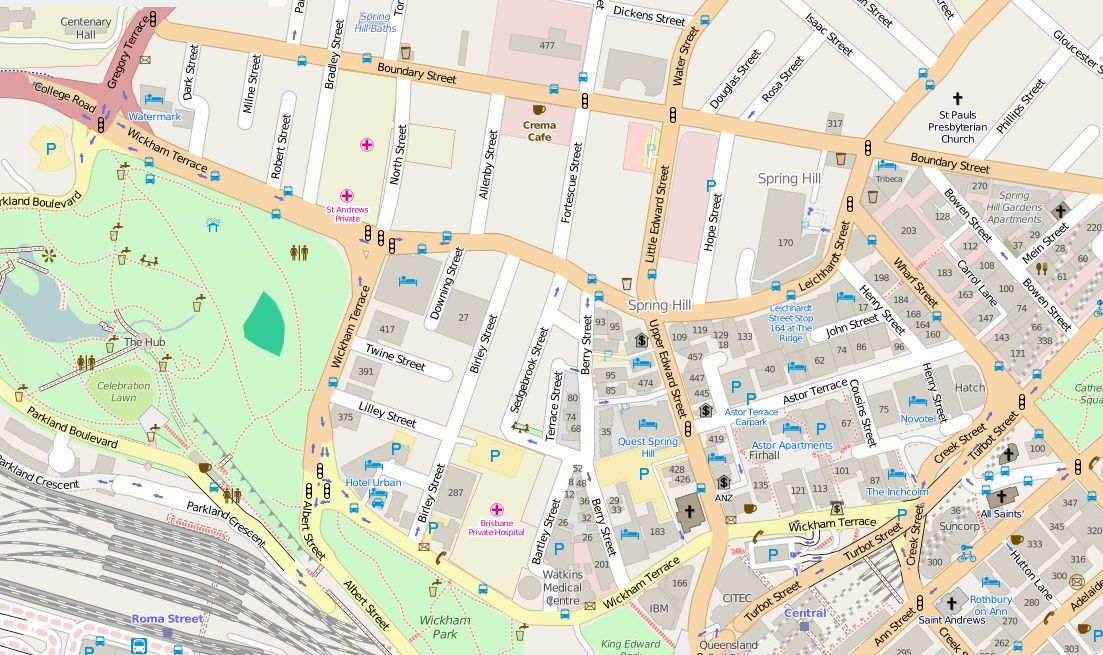
OpenStreetMap – Wickham Terrace, 2015

Wickham Terrace is one of the historic streets of Brisbane, Queensland, Australia. It is known as the street of private medical specialists.

== Geography ==
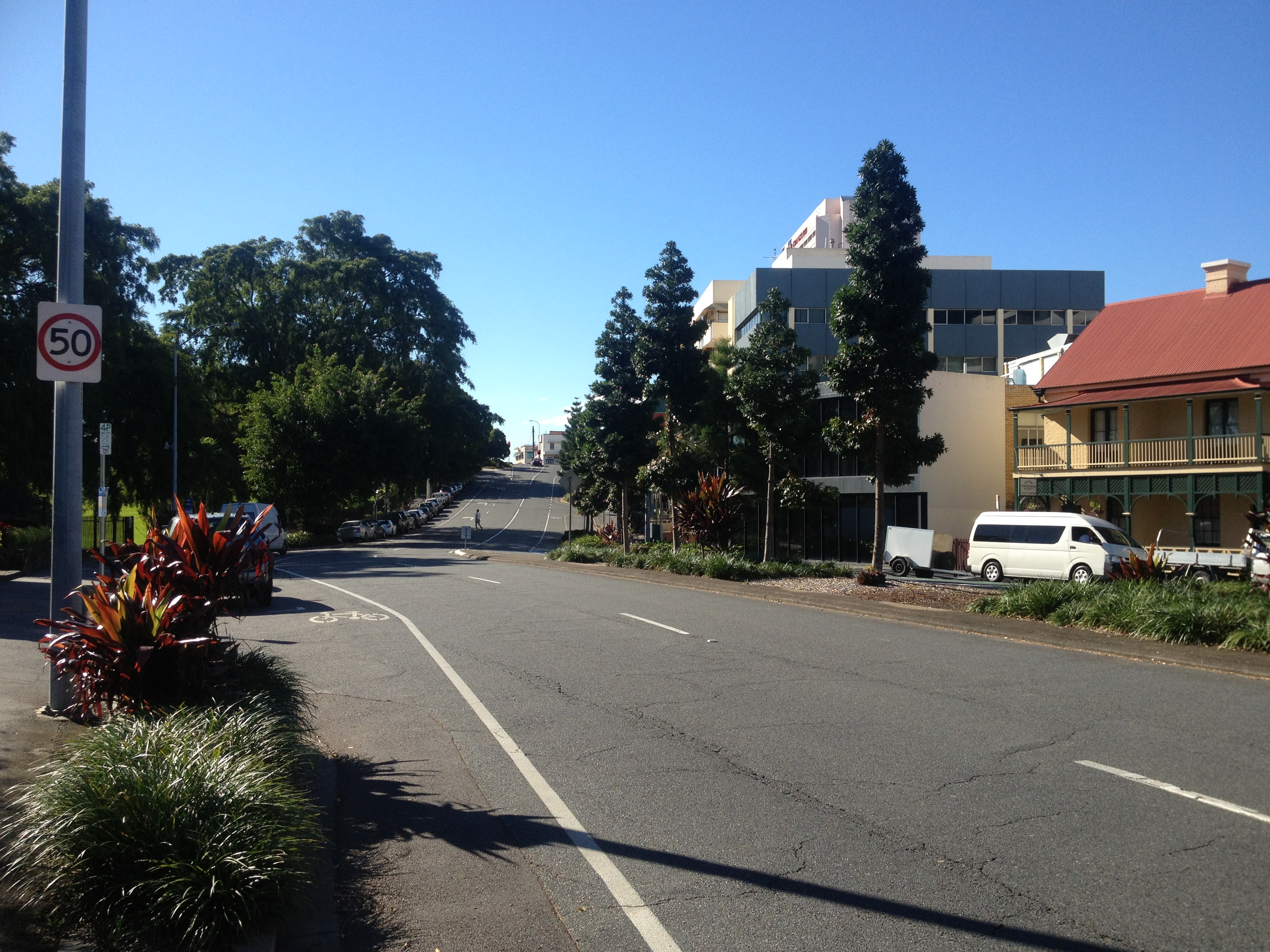
Wickham Terrace in Spring Hill, 2013

Wickham Terrace commences at the western corner of the intersection of Ann Street and Wharf Street in the Brisbane central business district (27.4641°S 153.0288°E) and then gradually rises in a winding westerly direction up the slopes of Spring Hill. It then follows the ridge and rises to the north and then to the west, creating the upper boundary of Albert Park. The name Wickham Terrace terminates at the intersection with Gregory Terrace (27.46087°S 153.0183°E) but the road continues as College Road through into the Normanby Fiveways.

== History ==
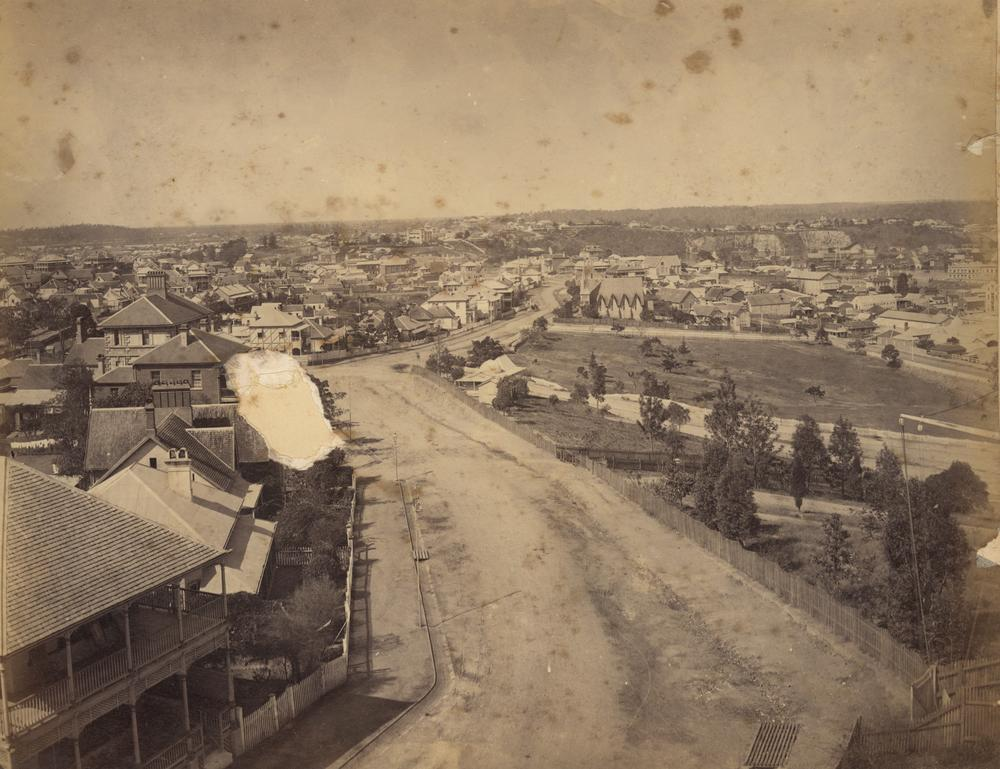
The street in 1863

Wickham Terrace is named after John Clements Wickham, the police magistrate and Government Resident of the Moreton Bay district.

Land sales occurred on Wickham Terrace in 1856. Because Spring Hill is higher than main Brisbane township, it was attractive for its views and cooling breezes. The better ventilation afforded by the breezes was also believed to create a healthier place to life, due to the prevailing belief in miasma (that disease was spread through bad air). Many prominent citizens built homes in Wickham Terrace and many civic institutions were established here.

Over time, hospitals and medical practices began to dominate the street and, since World War II, Wickham Terrace has been noted for its private medical specialists (similar to Harley Street in London).

From 1948, Rhoda Felgate operated her Twelfth Night Theatre in various buildings in Wickham Street.

== Landmarks ==
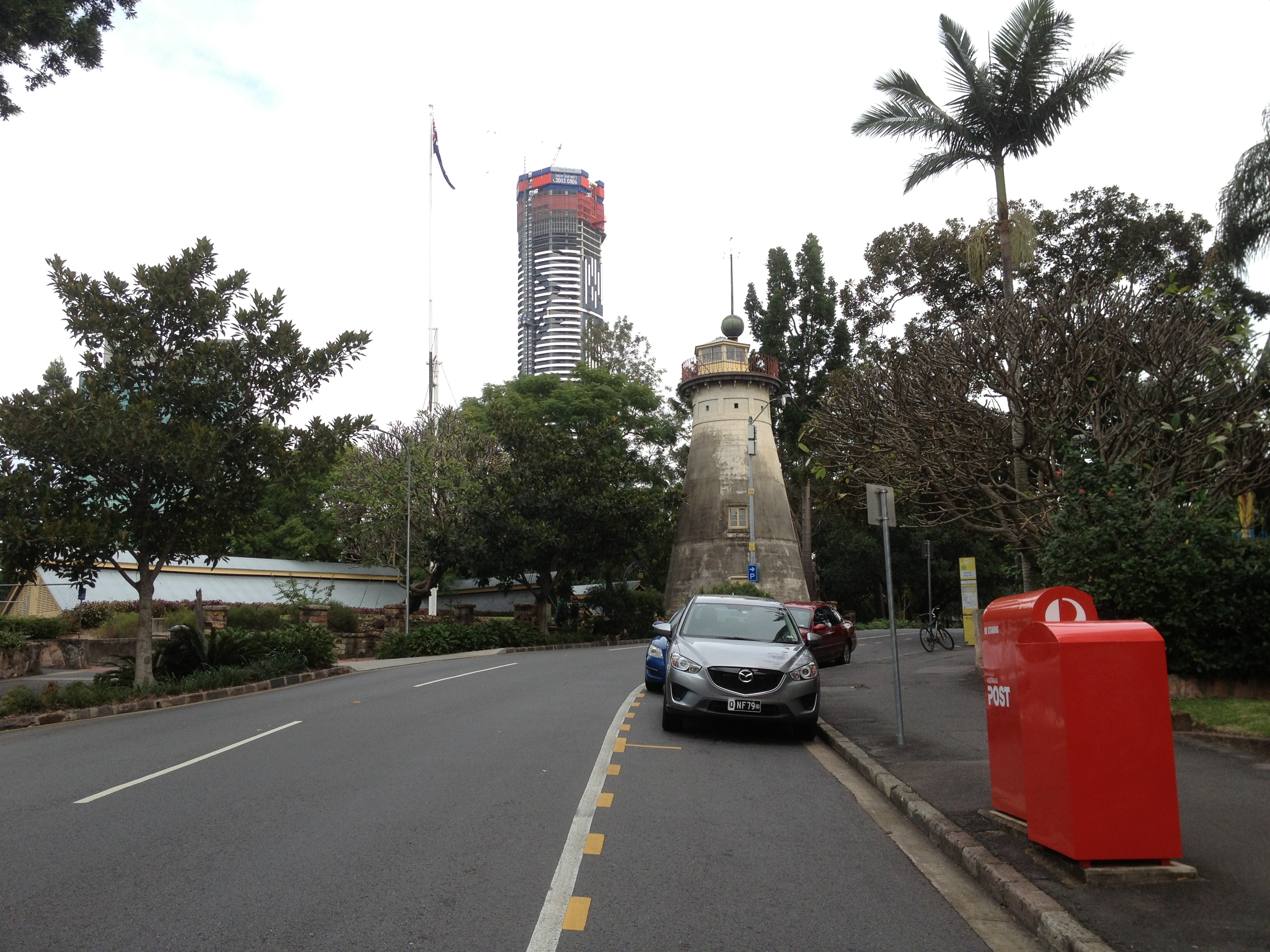
The Old Windmill and the Infinity Tower skyscraper under construction in 2013

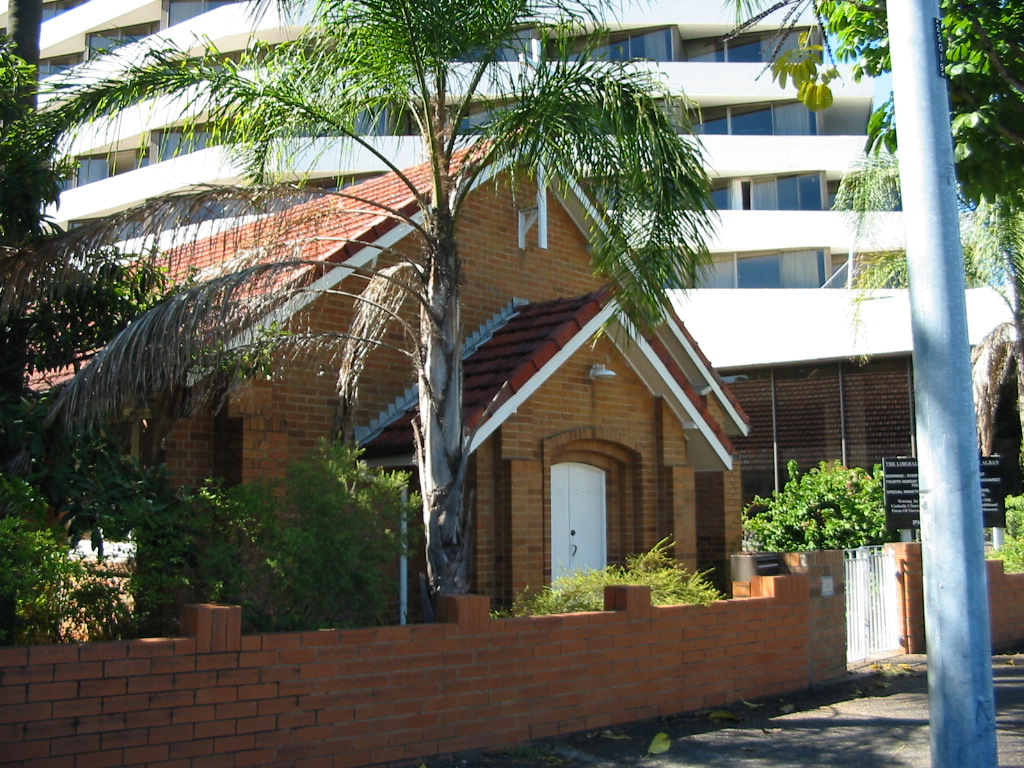
St Alban's Liberal Catholic Church, 2005

Many Brisbane landmarks are located on Wickham Terrace (as numbered, starting from the intersection at Ann and Wharf Streets):

- 25: St Andrew's Lutheran Church
- 32: All Saints Anglican Church
- 73: Inchcolm
- 79: Lister House
- 97: Espie Dods House
- 121: Ballow Chambers
- 136: Wickham Terrace Car Park
- 155–157: Wickham House
- 163: Baptist City Tabernacle
- 193: United Service Club Premises
- 217: Craigston
- 226: The Old Windmill
- 230: Spring Hill Reservoirs
- 287: Bryntirion
- 307: Athol Place
- 330: Wickham Park Air Raid Shelters
- 351: St Alban's Liberal Catholic Church
- 355: Theosophical Society Building
- 465: St Andrews War Memorial Hospital
- 497–535: Lady Bowen Hospital
- 500: Monier Ventilation Shaft 1
- Roma Street Parklands (formerly Albert Park)
