= National Mutual Life Building, Brisbane =

National Mutual Life Building
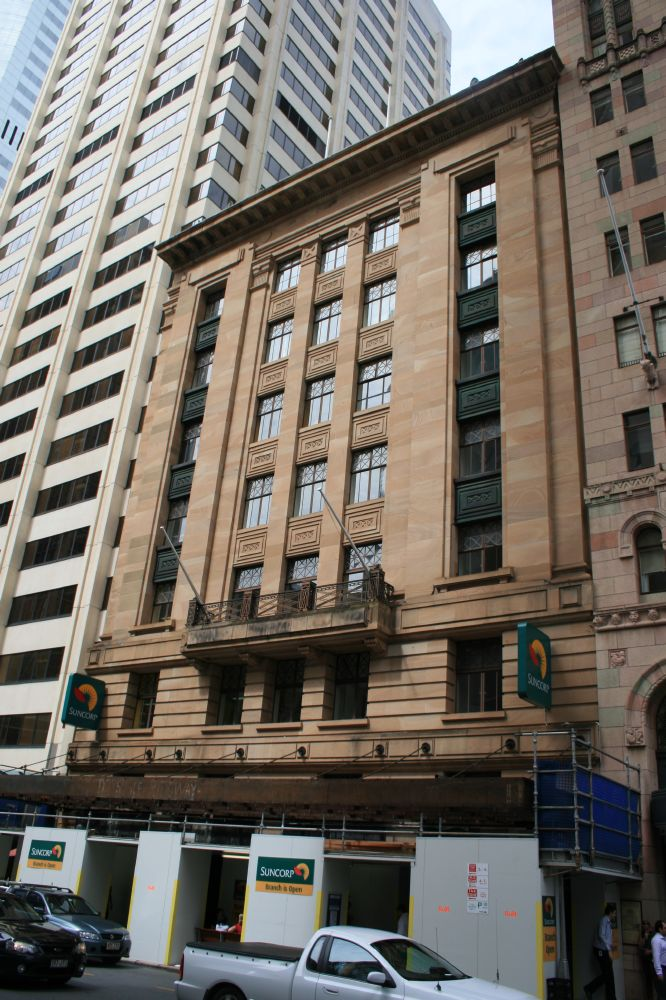
- National Mutual Life Building (then Custom Credit House), 2009

- Location within Queensland Location within Australia
- 27.4676°S 153.0284°E
- Location: 299 Queen Street, Brisbane City, City of Brisbane, Queensland, Australia

History
- Design period: 1919–1930s (interwar period)
- Built: 1926

Site notes
- Architect(s): Gibbs, Finlay & Morsby, Thomas Blair Moncrieff Wightman

Queensland Heritage Register
- Official name: Custom Credit House, Metway Chambers, National Mutual Life Building
- Type: state heritage (built)
- Designated: 21 October 1992
- Reference no.: 600151
- Significant period: 1926s (fabric); 1926–1981 (historical)
- Significant components: residential accommodation – caretaker's quarters
- Builders: J L Green & Sons

National Mutual Life Building is a heritage-listed office building at 299 Queen Street, Brisbane City, City of Brisbane, Queensland, Australia. It was designed by Gibbs, Finlay & Morsby in conjunction with Thomas Blair Moncrieff Wightman and was built in 1926 by J L Green & Sons. It is also known as Metway Chambers and Custom Credit House. It was added to the Queensland Heritage Register on 21 October 1992.

== History ==
National Mutual Life Building was constructed in 1926. Part of this site was purchased by the National Mutual Life Association of Australasia in January 1883 for the association's headquarters. Title to the adjoining allotment was acquired by the association in July 1920. National Mutual Life proposed the reconstruction of its central offices on the site in 1925. Other contemporaneous redevelopments near the site included the Commonwealth Bank (1929), Colonial Mutual Life (1930–31) and the AMP building (1930–34).

Designed by Melbourne architects Gibbs, Finlay and Morsby, in conjunction with Thomas Blair Moncrieff Wightman, Brisbane, the new seven storey building provided 114 offices, a basement and caretaker's quarters on the roof. The tender of JL Green and Sons, contractors, was accepted in January 1926, the former offices were demolished in February and construction began.

National Mutual Life occupied the building until 1981 when the property was sold to Havelah Investments. In 1982 Comord Pty Ltd purchased the building and the following year $4 million was spent on refurbishment. Since 1987 the building has been leased by Custom Credit and in 1988 Suncorp Insurance bought the property.

== Description ==
This inter-war commercial building is seven storeys in height with a basement and a caretakers office as an attic level. It is a stone faced building on a reinforced concrete structure. The scale and form of the building and the colour of its stonework complements nearby buildings on this side of Queen Street.

It has a bronze faced suspended awning and bronze panels separating the windows of the end bays, from the second floor upwards. These end window bays project slightly from the rest of the building and have plain, flanking giant order pilasters. The three central bays of windows are more closely spaced. At their second floor level they extend to the floor and have a projecting balcony that is supported on brackets. This has a wrought iron railing of a diamond shape pattern between balusters of the same material.

The stone facing of the first floor level has banded rustication and visually forms a plinth to the upper levels. The windows of the three central bays are separated by decorative stone panels in the same pattern as the bronze panels of the outer bays. An elaborate cornice appears at the top of the facade. The raised sections of parapet above the end bays each have three small bronze acroteria.

Two flag poles are situated between these raised sections. The caretakers quarters are set back behind this at roof level. The visible portion of the north-eastern elevation has some window openings, but its surface has been rendered and painted. The windows of the front facade are still the original pattern with crossed diagonal glazing bars in their upper portion with four vertical panes below. The shopfronts below the street awning are not original.

Internally the ground floor lobby and lifts have been refurbished. The original main stair remains but has been enclosed as a fire stair and now exits to the footpath. All floors now have suspended ceilings and partitioning. The original caretaker's quarters is now used as office space and opens to a small roof terrace behind the parapet.

== Heritage listing ==
National Mutual Life Building was listed on the Queensland Heritage Register on 21 October 1992 having satisfied the following criteria.

The place is important in demonstrating the evolution or pattern of Queensland's history.

It is important in demonstrating the pattern of Queensland's history, in particular the 1925/35 redevelopment of this financial sector of Queen Street.

The place is important in demonstrating the principal characteristics of a particular class of cultural places.

It is important in demonstrating the principal characteristics of an inter-war commercial building.

The place is important because of its aesthetic significance.

It is important in exhibiting aesthetic characteristics valued by the community, in particular:

- as a fine example of an interwar commercial building reflecting the dignity and solidity of a financial institution
- the building's contribution to the visual cohesiveness of this portion of Queen Street
