= Alexander Raff =

The Hon Alexander Raff
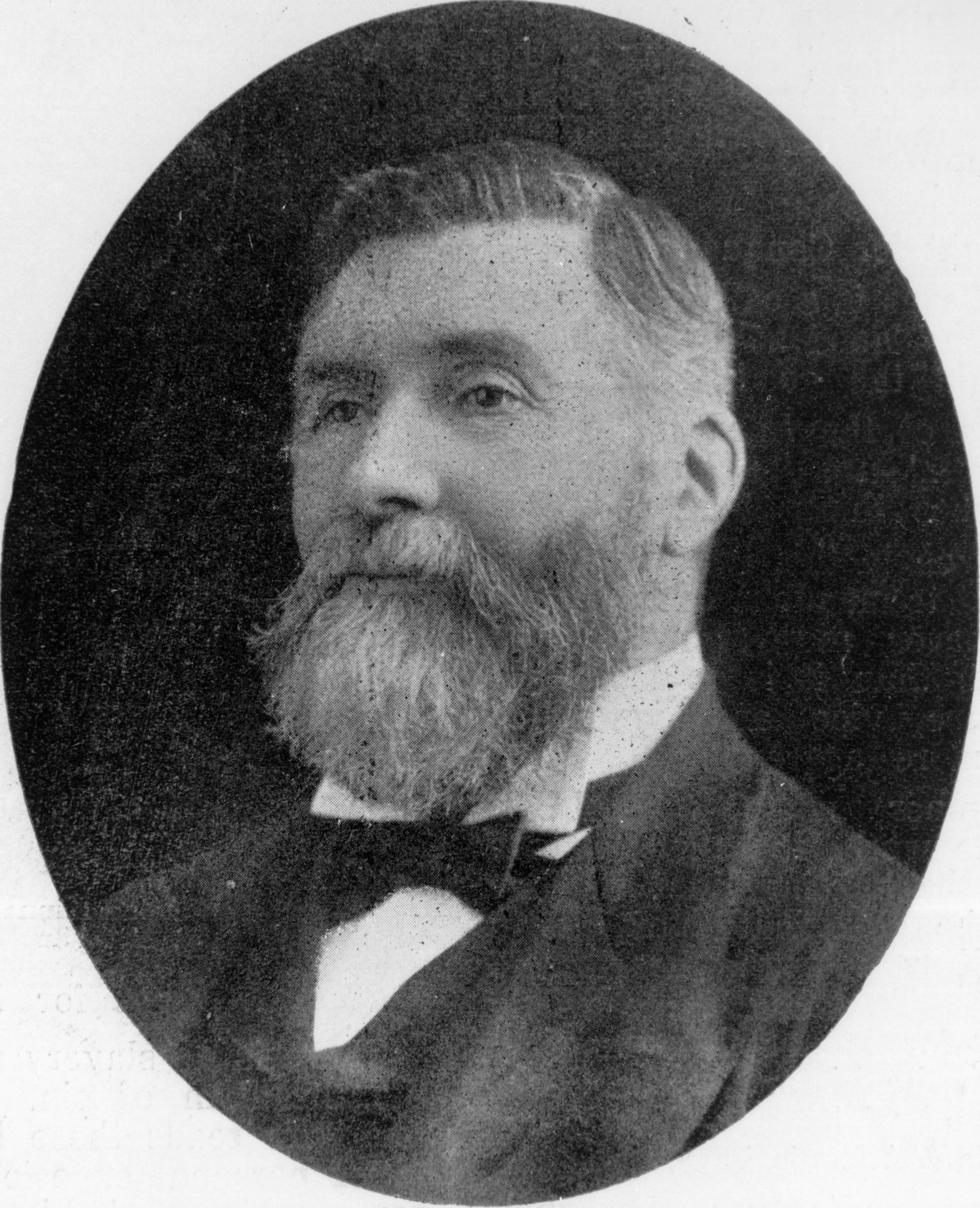

Member of the Queensland Legislative Council
- In office 14 August 1884 – 10 June 1910

Personal details
- Born: Alexander Raff; 20 July 1820 Forres, Elginshire, Scotland
- Died: 26 January 1914 (aged 93) Brisbane, Queensland, Australia
- Resting place: Toowong Cemetery
- Spouse: Elizabeth Millar Patterson (m.1862 d.1909)
- Relations: George Raff (brother)
- Occupation: Curator, Company director

Alexander Raff (1820–1914) was a politician in Queensland, Australia. He was a Member of the Queensland Legislative Council.

== Early life ==
Raff was born in Forres, Elginshire, Scotland, in July 1820, as the third son of James and Margaret Raff. Raff arrived in New South Wales in 1845, following his eldest brother, George Raff, who had arrived in 1841. After first settling in Victoria pursuing pastoral interests, Raff arrived in Brisbane, aboard the Souvenir schooner on 9 April 1851.

== Queensland years ==
Raff purchased two blocks of land on what was to become Gregory Terrace in Spring Hill on 14 May 1860 for £312.4.3. A third adjacent block was subsequently bought by Raff in 1864 from the original 1860 purchaser, John Frederick McDougall.

In January 1861, Raff was seriously injured when he was thrown from his horse.

Raff married Elizabeth Millar Patterson, the elder daughter of a prominent Scottish medical family, in Sydney on 5 June 1862. The newly-weds arrived in Brisbane aboard the Balclutha on 13 June 1862. Raff and his wife Elizabeth had seven children, six of whom survived to adulthood. At some point prior to the birth of his first child, Jessie Watson, on 18 April 1863, the now heritage-listed house Grangehill was built on the Gregory Terrace site and occupied by Raff's family.

In 1865 Raff was appointed to the position of Official Assignee of Insolvent Estates, and in 1868 he was promoted to the position of Curator of Intestate Estates. The Official Assignee was responsible for collecting the assets of an insolvent debtor and distributing them among the creditors; the Curator of Intestate Estates administered the estate of deceased persons, thought to have died intestate.

Raff continued his pastoral interests in Queensland, on his property, Logie Plains on the Darling Downs. For many years from the 1880s, Raff was a partner of Smellie and Co, looking after the financial interests of the company.

In August 1884 Raff was appointed to the Queensland Legislative Council.

Raff was an active member of various organisations and societies, including the Brisbane School of Arts, where he was elected treasurer in January 1854; the Pilot's Board; the Queensland Horticultural and Agricultural Society and the Queensland Philosophical Society, in both of which he acted as treasurer during the 1860s. Raff was the first president of the Young Men's Christian Association in Queensland. Other organisations of which he was a member include the Queensland Steam Navigation Company; the Board of National Education pending the passing of the Education Act in 1860; and, later, the men's steering committee for the Brisbane Children's Hospital established in 1878. Raff was a director of the Scottish Mutual Land and Mortgage Company; the Agricultural Company; the Brisbane Gas Company and National Mutual Life Association. Raff was an elder in the Presbyterian Church.

== Later life ==
Raff retired from the legislative council on 10 June 1910 (he was approaching his 90th birthday).

Raff died on 26 January 1914. He was buried in the Toowong Cemetery on 27 January 1914.
