= Cliveden Mansions =

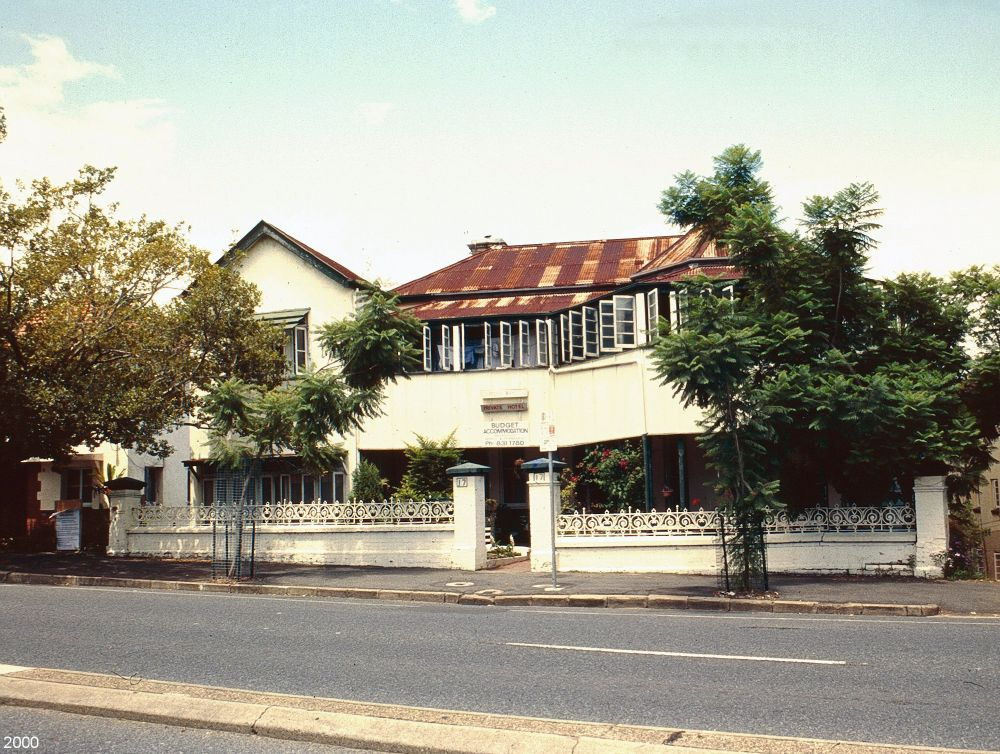

- Location within Queensland Location within Australia
- 27.4604°S 153.019°E
- Location: 17 Gregory Terrace, Spring Hill, City of Brisbane, Queensland, Australia

History
- Design period: 1870s–1890s (late 19th century)
- Built: 1888, 1915
- Built for: Selina Forth

Site notes
- Architect: George Henry Male Addison

Queensland Heritage Register
- Official name: Cliveden Mansions, Chippendale
- Type: state heritage (built)
- Designated: 29 April 2003
- Reference no.: 602186
- Significant period: 1888 (fabric, historical); 1915 (fabric, historical)
- Significant components: fence/wall – perimeter, residential accommodation – main house, steps/stairway, pathway/walkway

Cliveden Mansions is a heritage-listed villa at 17 Gregory Terrace, Spring Hill, City of Brisbane, Queensland, Australia. It was built in 1888 and extended in 1915, both to designs of George Henry Male Addison. It is also known as Chippendale. It was added to the Queensland Heritage Register on 29 April 2003.

== History ==
The first structure built at 17 Gregory Terrace was "Chippendale", a detached house designed by George Henry Male Addison for Selina Forth. A purpose-built boarding house was added in 1915 for Pauline Eschenhagan, also to the design of George Addison. Both the house and rear addition have continued to be used as boarding house accommodation since this time, and are currently known as "Cliveden Mansions".

Land in the settlement of Brisbane was first alienated from the Crown in 1856. Some of the earliest land purchases were made in the Spring Hill area, including lots along Wickham and Gregory Terraces. The site of Cliveden Mansions, described as portion 216, county of Stanley, parish of Brisbane, was originally granted to Patrick Bradley in 1861. The holding was later subdivided, and subdivisions 3 and 4 were acquired by the Crowther family in 1872. The Crowthers sold the property ten years later to Moses Ward, a Fortitude Valley chemist. Throughout this time, Post Office Directories indicate the property was vacant. Selina Forth became the owner of the property in 1888, and retained the title until her death in 1911. It was during Ms Forth's ownership of the property that Chippendale was built.

The construction of Chippendale was the result of human tragedy in the Forth family. Selina Forth was the wife of John William Forth, an alderman for the east ward in 1882 and 1883, and the owner of a large wholesale and retail produce business located in Elizabeth Street. The Forths, together with their ten children, were residents of Wickham Terrace in the early 1880s, before moving to Stanley Hall at Clayfield, built for the Forths in 1885–86. The Forths resided only a short time at Stanley Hall. Clara Forth, their 20-year-old daughter, died there in 1886, and shortly after the family returned from a visit to Europe toward the end of the year, John Forth was killed while helping transplant trees in a paddock near his home, on 28 December 1886. Selina Forth subsequently sold Stanley Hall in 1888, and purchased the Gregory Terrace property in the same year. She had George Addison of Oakden, Addison and Kemp design her house in 1888–89, and in 1890 she took up residence there, naming the house Chippendale. Mrs Forth lived in the house with her son William Forth, and, on occasion, two other women.

Following the death of Selina Forth in 1911, the beneficiaries of her will sold Chippendale to Pauline Emma Eschenhagen in 1913. Pauline Eschenhagen, together with her husband Carl, and later her son Edward, ran a very successful restaurant and catering business in the late nineteenth and early twentieth century. Anti-German sentiment during World War I forced the sale of the business in 1915, and Ms Eschenhagen mortgaged Chippendale and had the architect of the original house, GMH Addison, design the large boarding house extension to the rear of the property. It is thought the front northern addition to the house was also completed at this time. In 1915 the property was leased to Grace Tate who ran the property as a boarding house. Ms Tate held a lease on Chippendale, including the boarding house extension, at least until 1929. In the same year, the boarding house extensions were added. Ms Eschenhagen also had architect Thomas Ramsay Hall design a new villa residence further along Gregory Terrace next to St Joseph's College, and lived in this house with her family until her death in 1921.

As proprietor of the boarding house establishment, Grace Tate represented a common practice whereby many of Brisbane's boarding houses were run by women. The 1916 listing of boarding houses in Pugh's Almanac noted 54 such establishments, of which 40 were run by women. The figures for 1918 show a similar pattern: 46 of the 66 boarding houses listed in Brisbane were operated by women. What was unusual about the Gregory Terrace boarding house was the purpose-built nature of the rear portion. It was a more common practice for boarding houses to be larger houses subdivided into smaller dwellings.

The construction and operation of the Gregory Terrace boarding house from 1915 reflects the popularity of Spring Hill and other inner-Brisbane suburbs as locations of boarding house accommodation at that time. Boarding houses existed in Brisbane from the earliest years of free settlement in the 1840s. From this era until the 1890s, boarding houses were particularly well established in the South Brisbane/West End/Woolloongabba, and Teneriffe/Newstead areas. The Brisbane floods of 1890 and 1893 adversely affected the popularity of South Brisbane however, and the population drifted to the north side of the river. Further impetus towards the establishment of boarding house accommodation in the inner-city suburbs occurred in the 1910s when the cost of living outgrow the rise in wages, a situation worsened by the outbreak of World War I in 1914. This economic pattern may have forced many into boarding house accommodation. The Great Depression of the 1930s certainly had this effect with an influx of labour into the cities in search of work.

Pugh's Almanac and the Post Office Directories from the 1910s indicate the saturation of lodging houses in Wickham Terrace and Boundary Street alone. Pugh's Almanac for the years 1916 and 1918 list 18 and 15 boarding houses in Wickham Terrace respectively, while in South Brisbane only seven are recorded for both years. The Post Office Directories for 1915–16 included listings for 195 boarding houses in Brisbane, of which six were listed in Boundary Street. While neither listing is conclusive, they do illustrate the importance of Spring Hill as a location of boarding houses.

During the 1930s Spring Hill and other inner-city suburbs waned in their popularity as a "desirable address", and they remained unpopular for much of the remainder of the twentieth century. Wealthy residents increasingly relocated from their inner city dwellings to the suburbs, and the inner-city area was increasingly known as an industrial and working class area. These areas continued to be considered "undesirable" in the 1970s and early 1980s when there was a decline in the number of families with young children, and an increase in elderly and single people, migrants from non-English speaking backgrounds and Indigenous Australians residing in the area. Significant numbers of former residents of psychiatric institutions also began relocating to boarding house and hostel accommodation within inner Brisbane. Attitudes began to change in the mid to late 1980s and 1990s however, as inner-city gentrification occurred. Properties were increasingly acquired for middle-class residential, commercial, recreational and cultural uses, including many boarding houses. Between 1987 and 1996, 37 per cent of all boarding house premises in inner north Brisbane suburbs closed, and pressure of redevelopment of these places continues.

The Gregory Terrace boarding house remained in the Eschenhagen family until 1949, and was renamed "Cliveden Mansions" during the family's ownership, in 1941. The Canadian Pacific Tobacco Company Ltd purchased the property in 1949, and the property was owned by four different owners during the 1950s before being bought by Salem Tamer in 1958. Hunsoomie Tamer became a joint owner in 1967, and Salem and Hunsoomie retained the property until 1979 when it was purchased by Neil Gibbins and Elaine Katte. The current owners, Treklodge Pty Ltd, purchased the property in 1992, and continue to operate Cliveden Mansions as a boarding house.

Brisbane City Council building records indicate approval for alterations to the building was given in 1957. It is not certain what this work was; however, it may have included various verandah enclosures and internal planning changes that currently exist.

== Description ==
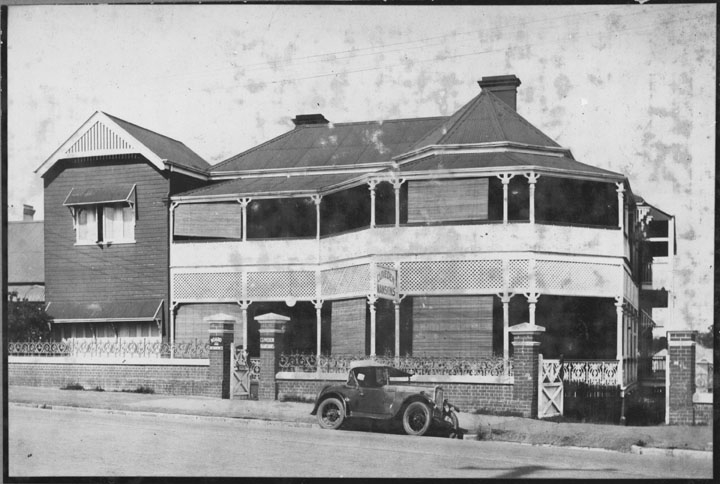
Cliveden Mansions, circa 1930

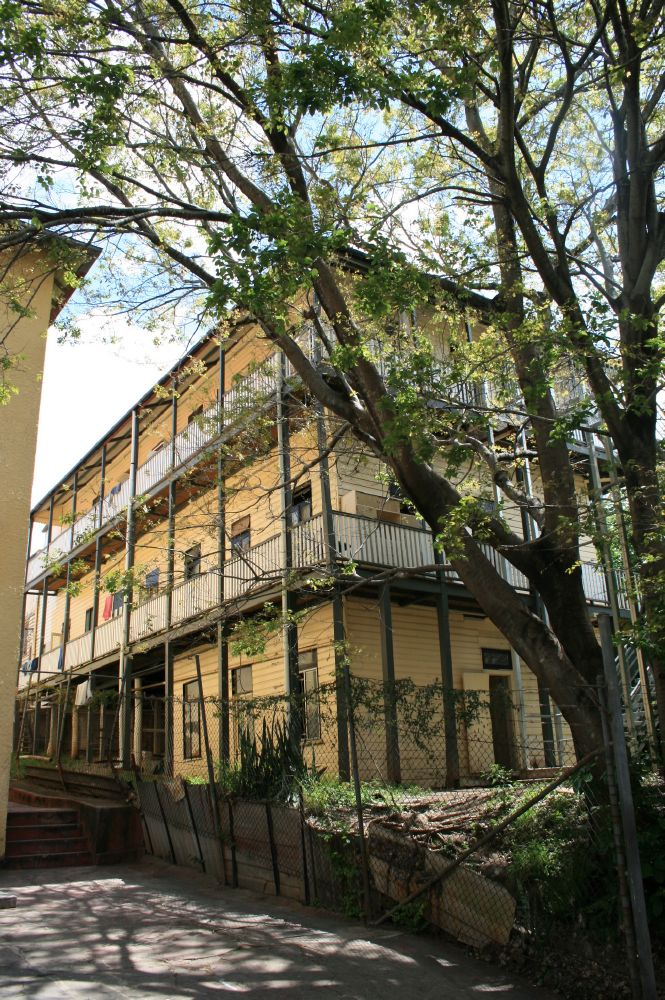
Modern-day picture of Cliveden Mansions

Cliveden Mansions consists of two main portions, the 1888–89 house fronting Gregory Terrace, and the 1915 boarding house extension to the rear.

The 1888–89 section of Cliveden Mansions is a two-storey rendered brick building, featuring timber-framed floors and roof, and corrugated iron roof cladding. Two original chimneys are visible above the roof line. A series of timber-framed additions exist to the northern and eastern sides of the masonry core. The northern addition has chamferboard external cladding which has been rendered. Timber-framed verandahs to two sides have also been enclosed.

Internally, the 1888–89 section consists of a series of major and minor rooms opening on to a central stairway and passage. A full room bay arrangement punctuates the otherwise rectilinear plan form and is surmounted by a distinctive octastyle roof. Most rooms have access to either the western or southern verandah. Much of the timber door and window joinery survives intact, including a coloured leaded glass main entry and coloured patterned glass stairwell window. The original timber internal staircase has been painted. Some original internal decorative finishes survive including moulded plaster cornices and ornate plaster ceiling roses.

The 1915 boarding house addition is a 2–3 storey timber-framed structure with a corrugated iron hip roof. The plan form is a simple series of single rooms accessed by a central corridor and opening out on to a narrow perimeter verandah. The eastern and southern external walls are clad with chamferboards while the northern external wall is of single-skin VJ construction.

The verandahs are simply detailed with timber dowel balustrades and timber French doors with fanlights opening out from the rooms. The verandah posts are stop chamfered. A modern steel stair is visible at the eastern end of the verandah.

Internally, the rooms are divided by single-skin VJ walls, interior ceilings and corridor walls are lined with VJ timber. Bathrooms are fitted with post-World War II fittings of varying styles and standards.

The existing brick-and-cast-iron fence to Gregory Terrace is thought to be the original 1888–89 fence. Evidence of the front stairs and path with a distinctive 45 degree turn also survives.

== Heritage listing ==
Cliveden Mansions was listed on the Queensland Heritage Register on 29 April 2003 having satisfied the following criteria.

The place is important in demonstrating the evolution or pattern of Queensland's history.

Cliveden Mansions is important in demonstrating the evolution of Queensland's history as an illustration of late nineteenth and twentieth century housing patterns in inner Brisbane. The 1888–89 section demonstrates a characteristic of Brisbane residential development whereby the wealthy built along hilltops and ridgelines, surrounded on the lower slopes and hollows by the less wealthy members of the community. It also demonstrates the expansion of residential development beyond the city centre in the later nineteenth century. The 1915 boarding house extension illustrates another housing pattern whereby inner-city suburbs such as Spring Hill had the highest concentrations of Brisbane boarding houses in the early twentieth century.

The place demonstrates rare, uncommon or endangered aspects of Queensland's cultural heritage.

The 1915 boarding house addition demonstrates rare aspects of Queensland's cultural heritage as a purpose-built boarding house. Most boarding houses were larger houses subdivided into smaller dwellings. The 1915 extension is also rare as a three-storey building constructed in light-weight timber framing.

The place is important because of its aesthetic significance.

The original 1888–89 house is important because of its aesthetic significance as a competent example of late nineteenth century Victorian domestic style architecture.
