= Grangehill =

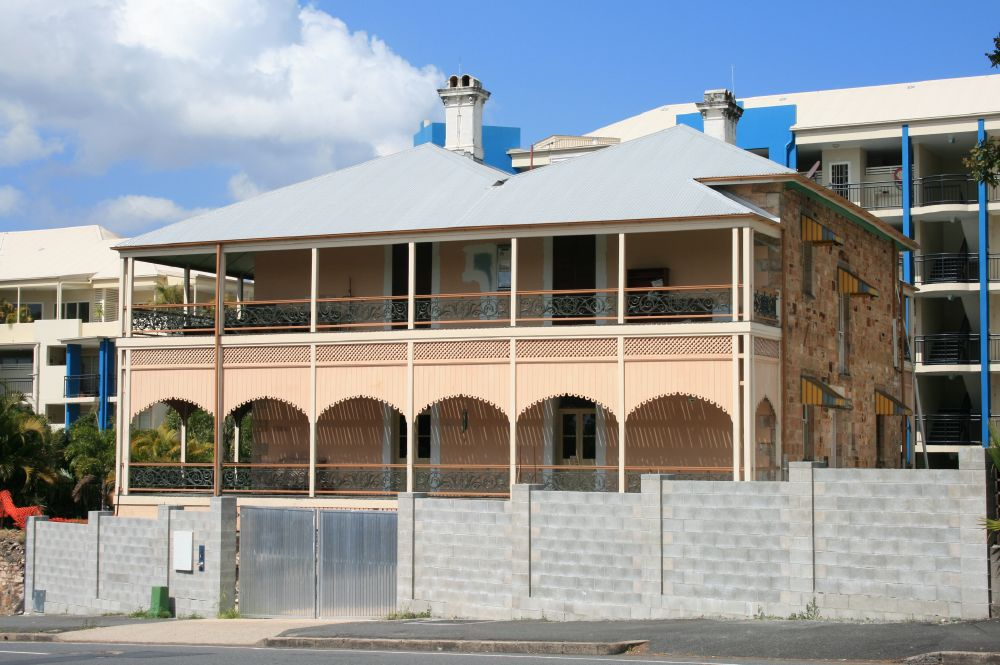
- Grangehill, 2008

- Location within Queensland Location within Australia
- 27.4534°S 153.028°E
- Location: 449 & 451 Gregory Terrace, Spring Hill, City of Brisbane, Queensland, Australia

History
- Design period: 1840s–1860s (mid-19th century)
- Built: early 1860s
- Built for: Alexander Raff

Queensland Heritage Register
- Official name: Grangehill, Grange Hill, St Teresa's Church Discalced Carmelite Priory and Retreat Centre
- Type: state heritage (landscape, built)
- Designated: 6 September 1995
- Reference no.: 601668
- Significant period: 1860s–1920s (fabric, historical)
- Significant components: residential accommodation – main house, views from, trees/plantings, carriage way/drive, wall/s – retaining, garden/grounds

Grangehill is a heritage-listed detached house at 449 & 451 Gregory Terrace, Spring Hill, City of Brisbane, Queensland, Australia. It was built in the early 1860s for Alexander Raff. It is also known as Grange Hill and St Teresa's Church Discalced Carmelite Priory & Retreat Centre. It was added to the Queensland Heritage Register on 6 September 1995.

== History ==
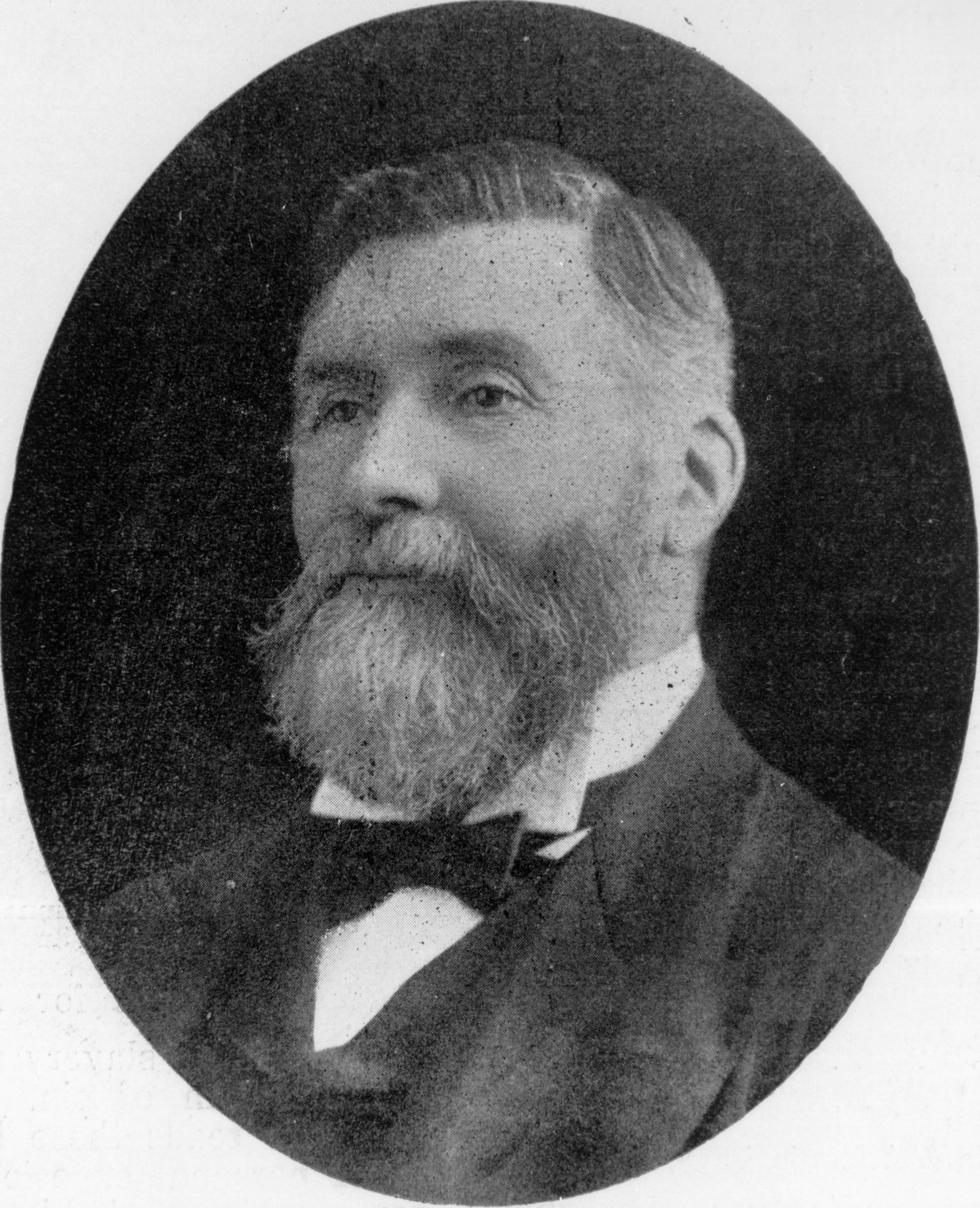
Alexander Raff

Grangehill is a substantial stone house which was constructed in the early 1860s, as the family home of Alexander Raff, a prominent member of Brisbane society and a later Member of the Queensland Legislative Council.

Alexander Raff was born in Forres, Elginshire, Scotland in July 1820, as the third son of James and Margaret Raff. Alexander arrived in New South Wales in 1845, following his eldest brother, George who had arrived in 1841. After first settling in Victoria pursuing pastoral interests, Alexander arrived in Brisbane, aboard the Souvenir schooner on April 9, 1851.

Alexander Raff was an active member of various organisations and societies, including the Brisbane School of Arts, where he was elected Treasurer in January 1854; the Pilot's Board; the Queensland Horticultural and Agricultural Society and the Queensland Philosophical Society, in both of which he acted as Treasurer during the 1860s. Raff was the first president of the Young Men's Christian Association in Queensland. Other organisations of which he was a member include the Queensland Steam Navigation Company; the Board of National Education pending the passing of the Education Act in 1860; and, later, the men's steering committee for the Brisbane Children's Hospital established in 1878. Alexander was a director of the Scottish Mutual Land and Mortgage Company; the Agricultural Company; the Brisbane Gas Company and National Mutual Life Association. Alexander continued his pastoral interests in Queensland, on his property, Logie Plains on the Darling Downs.

For many years from the 1880s Alexander Raff was a partner of Smellie and Co, looking after the financial interests of the company. Raff was an elder in the Presbyterian Church.

In 1865 Alexander was appointed to the position of Official Assignee of Insolvent Estates and in 1868 he was promoted to the position of Curator of Intestate Estates. The Official Assignee was responsible for collecting the assets of an insolvent debtor and distributing them among the creditors; the Curator of Intestate Estates administered the estate of deceased persons, thought to have died intestate. In August 1884 Alexander Raff was appointed to the Queensland Legislative Council, a position he held until his resignation in June, 1910.

Raff married Elizabeth Millar Patterson, the elder daughter of a prominent Scottish medical family, in Sydney on 5 June 1862. The newly weds arrived in Brisbane aboard the Balclutha on 13 June 1862.

Alexander Raff purchased two blocks of land on what was to become Gregory Terrace on 14 May 1860, for £312/4/3. A third adjacent block was subsequently bought by Raff in 1864 from the original 1860 purchaser, John Frederick McDougall.

The first mention of Raff's occupation of Grangehill, is upon the birth of their first child, Jessie Watson, on the 18 April 1863, where Grangehill is nominated as the family home. It is presumed that Raff built the house after the purchase of land in 1860. Although the architect is unknown, a possible candidate would be James Cowlishaw, who designed a store for Alexander's brother's company, George Raff and Co in 1862 and later, in 1864, additions to Raff's Wharf in Brisbane. Cowlishaw is also thought to have been a personal friend of the Raffs.

During the late 1860s and early 1870s, Raff sold land on the Warry Street side of the block, and re-purchased it by 1874. In 1879 both John Petrie and Augustus Gregory built substantial family homes on property on Gregory Terrace previously purchased by them in the sale of 1860. By 1883 Warry Street had been extended north to Gregory Terrace, onto Raff's allotment 258.

Alexander and Elizabeth Raff had seven children, six of whom survived to adulthood. In August 1893, one of the daughters, Margaret Cumming Raff, married Mr T.C. Woolnough, in a ceremony held at Grangehill. It is thought that during the 1880s or 1890s a verandah was added to both stories of three sides of the house, and that bay windows were added to four of the principal entrance elevation.

On Alexander's death on January 26, 1914, the house was left in trust to his eldest son, James, who enabled the Red Cross to use it after the First World War as a convalescent home.

In 1924 Brisbane architects, Chambers and Ford, designed additions to Grangehill, converting the house into two flats, one of which James Raff moved into for a short time. These additions included a wing on the north west which housed a kitchen and laundry, and the closing of sections of the verandah for use as bathrooms. A new entrance to Grangehill was planned from Gregory Terrace, through the new wing.

By 1929, the Grangehill property was subdivided, when a Dr Henry Joseph Windsor is listed as living on the Warry Street corner of the property, in a timber house also designed by Chambers and Ford. On the Brunswick Street side of the property is a block of six flats which survive in 1995. From 1929, the two flats at Grangehill were let to a Mr Edward Kivas Tully and a PJ Teeley, who remained there until Mrs Adele Magnum is listed as running a boarding house from Grangehill for about two years from 1939. According to family history, Grangehill was then used by American soldiers in the Second World War. James Raff died in 1939, leaving the house in trust to his nephew, James Cluny Raff.

In 1949 the property was offered for sale by James Cluny Raff, and passed out of the family who had owned it since 1860. The auction notice for this sale notes a substantial wooden cottage on the block, no longer extant. The Discalced Carmelite Fathers purchased Grangehill in March 1950, and it has remained their headquarters and retreat centre until 1995. The Fathers made alterations to the house between 1965 and 1970. These included the demolition of the 1924 kitchen wing, and its replacement with another wing, the removal of the first floor bay windows, and the addition of some interior arch screens. A later addition saw the erection of a retreat centre abutting the south east side of the house. Subsequently, the Carmelite community in Brisbane met at a number of temporary locations until the Carmelite nuns at Ormiston built a meeting place called Avila on their grounds.

In 1995, Grangehill was purchased by Ipswich businessman Edwin Stoyle.

The Stoyle family sold the property in 2023.

== Description ==
Grangehill, a two-storeyed Brisbane tuff and sandstone residence with a hipped corrugated iron roof, is located on an elevated position above Gregory Terrace to the northwest and has views over the surrounding suburbs of Fortitude Valley, Bowen Hills and Herston.

The roof, consisting of U-shaped hips with a central box gutter, has a raised central skylight and two rendered chimney stacks with cornice detailing. The building has verandahs to the northeast and southeast, with the ground floor of the southeast verandah having been removed during 1960s extensions (retreat centre), and northwest verandah having been removed for the 1950s extensions. The verandahs have cast iron balustrade panels with timber rails, chamfered timber verandah posts, and a rendered masonry base. The ground floor has an arched boarded timber valance with timber lattice panels above, which have been covered over with weatherboard, and the second floor has a raked ceiling lined with hardboard sheets with timber cover strips. The first floor of the southeast verandah has been enclosed with glass louvres.

The central entry projects slightly from the verandah and has paired corner posts, a timber arch to the ground floor, and sandstone steps, and was originally surmounted by a pediment which is no longer extant. The ground floor verandah walls are of coursed Brisbane tuff with dressed hammer-faced sandstone quoining to the main entry. The central entry, which has a panelled timber door with glass sidelights and fanlight assembly with the name GRANGEHILL in the fanlight, is surrounded by vermiculated sandstone quoining and is flanked by bay windows to either side which projects from the face of the wall. These bays have tall sash windows, with the southern bay incorporating a multi-paned glass door. The first floor verandah walls are finished in scribed render, and had similar early bays which have been removed, but evidence of their form can be seen in the verandah floor boards and ceiling sheeting. The southern bay has been replaced with a sliding aluminium framed glass door, and the northern bay has been replaced with a pair of timber framed French doors.

The rear of the building has mostly coursed hammer-faced sandstone with quoining to the corners and an expressed band at first floor level. Windows are multi-paned sashes, with a tall arched sash window at mid-floor level to the stair landing. Striped metal awnings and a brick rear entry lean-to have been added recently.

The two-storeyed northwest extension replaced the original two-storeyed verandah and attached kitchen, and consists of a rendered masonry structure with a corrugated iron gable roof and a large crucifix in relief on the northwest wall. Windows are metal framed casements, and a crucifix is affixed to the gable apex.

The southeast extension (retreat centre) consists of a two-storeyed U-shaped brick structure with a flat ribbed sheet metal roof. One side of the U-shaped structure replaced the southeast ground floor verandah, with the central section spanning over a driveway, and the southern side incorporating a sub-floor level.

Internally, the building has plastered masonry walls, ceilings, cornices and picture rails, and cedar joinery (some of which is painted) including panelled doors, architraves, corniced panels above doorheads, skirtings and staircase. The ground floor of the building has a central entrance hall with a large room to either side. The entrance hall has an arch, leading to a wider rear hall, with plastered extrados and imposts and a glass panel with the word CLOISTER. The northern room has an ornate plaster ceiling pendant and pendant light fitting, and a marble fireplace surround with tile inserts and cast iron screen. The southern room has a plaster ceiling pendant and a wide arch dividing the room in two, with two side doorways (originally with French doors opening to a verandah) which have painted glass fanlights each consisting of landscape scenes in sepia tones. The room originally had a white marble fireplace surround which has been removed.

The rear hall has two rooms opening to either side, with the northwest room having undergone a number of changes and now has timber framed glass doors within an original archway, and a partition wall of arches forming a central hallway. The rear hall has a painted half-turn with landings staircase with turned balustrade and square newel posts.

The first floor has a central hall with an arch, which has plastered extrados and imposts, opening to three front rooms. The northern room has been partitioned to create two rooms with a corridor at the rear accessing the northwest extension. A bathroom, which has been recently refitted, is located centrally and is lit by a skylight. An early storage cupboard adjacent to the bathroom retains the only section of pressed metal ceiling to the first floor.

The northwest extension has a kitchen, laundry and bathroom to the ground floor, with a staircase accessing the first floor which houses bathrooms and bedrooms. The southeast extension (retreat centre) has a chapel, confessionals, seminar room and bedrooms to the first floor, bedrooms and garages to the ground floor, and bedrooms to the sub-floor level.

The building is accessed off Gregory Terrace via a curved driveway with turning circle. The grounds include two large fig trees to the east of the driveway, and several substantial umbrella and camphor laurel trees. A stone embankment wall is located along the Gregory Terrace alignment.

== Heritage listing ==
Grangehill was listed on the Queensland Heritage Register on 6 September 1995 having satisfied the following criteria.

The place is important in demonstrating the evolution or pattern of Queensland's history.

Grangehill is illustrative of the residential development of Spring Hill during the nineteenth century.

The place demonstrates rare, uncommon or endangered aspects of Queensland's cultural heritage.

The house is one of the earliest surviving in Brisbane and as such a rare extant example of a substantial 1860s stone residence.

Internal fittings which are early and rare include the lower floor ceiling roses, the lower floor ceiling with associated cornice, the painted glass transom windows and timber joinery.

The place is important in demonstrating the principal characteristics of a particular class of cultural places.

Though it was extended at various times, the building retains a substantial amount of original fabric and is representative of a large early Victorian era residence.

The place is important because of its aesthetic significance.

Located on an elevated position, the building and grounds, including the driveway, landscaped grounds and stone embankment wall, make a substantial contribution to the amenity of the Gregory Terrace streetscape and Spring Hill townscape.

The place has a special association with the life or work of a particular person, group or organisation of importance in Queensland's history.

Grangehill, a two storied stone residence constructed in Spring Hill in the early 1860s by prominent Brisbane businessman and pastoralist, Alexander Raff, has associations with the Raff family, who were instrumental in establishing various Brisbane businesses and institutions.

Grangehill was purchased by the Discalced Carmelite Fathers in 1950, and retains important associations with the order as their Queensland headquarters and Retreat Centre.
