= Victoria Flats =

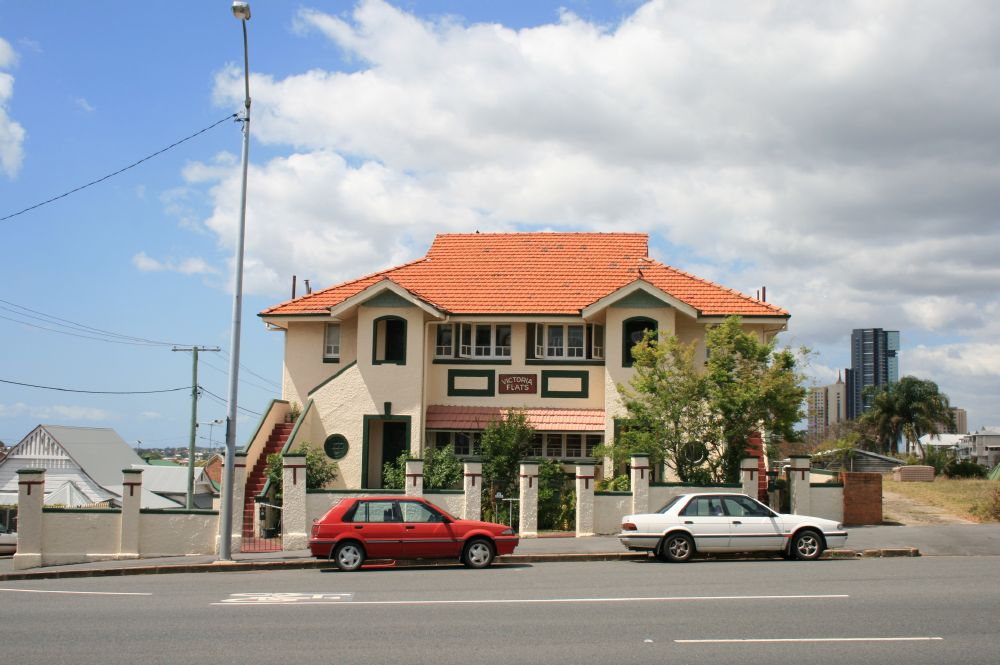
- Victoria Flats, 2008

- Location within Queensland Location within Australia
- 27.456°S 153.0267°E
- Location: 369 Gregory Terrace, Spring Hill, City of Brisbane, Queensland, Australia

History
- Design period: 1919–1930s (interwar period)
- Built: c. 1922
- Built for: Fanny Kilroe

Site notes
- Architect: Thomas Blair Moncrieff Wightman

Queensland Heritage Register
- Official name: Victoria Flats, Kilroe's Flats, Morella, Carinyah, Lumtah and Neerim
- Type: state heritage (built, landscape)
- Designated: 30 March 2001
- Reference no.: 601888
- Significant period: 1920s (fabric, historical)
- Significant components: garage, views from, garden/grounds, residential accommodation – flat/s, lead light/s, trees/plantings, gate – entrance, fence/wall – perimeter, basement / sub-floor, furniture/fittings
- Builders: Cheesman & Bull

Victoria Flats is a heritage-listed apartment block at 369 Gregory Terrace, Spring Hill, City of Brisbane, Queensland, Australia. It was designed by architect Thomas Blair Moncrieff Wightman and built c. 1922 by Cheesman & Bull. It is also known as Kilroe's Flats and Morella, Carinyah, Lumtah and Neerim. It was added to the Queensland Heritage Register on 30 March 2001.

== History ==
Victoria Flats are understood to have been known initially as Kilroe's Flats, erected c. 1923 for Mrs Fanny (Frances) Kilroe. Designed by influential Brisbane architect Thomas Blair Moncrieff Wightman, they were amongst the first purpose-designed flats constructed in Brisbane.

This part of Spring Hill had been surveyed into 2 acre suburban allotments in 1860. Allotment 253, which ran between Gregory Terrace (which at the time formed the town boundary) and Water Street, and included the site of the later flats, was purchased in May 1860 by William Gray of Brisbane for the sum of £62. In 1863 Gray subdivided the land into 12 smaller residential subdivisions and William (later Kinross) Street. Most of the blocks lower down the hill in Spring Hollow sold quickly, but Gray retained the blocks fronting Gregory Terrace (subs 1–3 of allotment 253 – 1 rood 37.6 perches). This land remained vacant until Frances Kilroe, wife of Joseph Kilroe, acquired title in September 1918. The Kilroes erected a residence, Mirrunya, on subdivision 2, and were listed as resident there in the 1919–20 Post Office Directory. Joseph Kilroe was associated with the drapery and haberdashery firm of Finney Isles & Co., and had married Fanny Elliott in Brisbane in 1895.

In 1922, Mrs Kilroe made application to the Brisbane Municipal Council to erect a block of flats on Gregory Terrace, with the plans approved in November. The architect was listed as T.B.M. Wightman, and the contractors as Cheesman & Bull of Charlotte Street. The flats were erected on subdivision 1 of allotment 253, adjacent to Mirrunya, with frontages to Gregory Terrace and Kinross Street. Plans published in the Architectural and Building Journal of Queensland in June 1923 show a two-storeyed block of four flats (2 on each level), each with separate entrance, front verandah, vestibule, living room, dining room, kitchen, 2 bedrooms, rear sleeping verandah, bathroom, laundry and toilet. Details of the street fencing were also included. The flats were completed by mid-1924, and were known initially as Kilroe's Flats. Each of the four flats also had an individual name: Morella, Carinyah, Lumtah and Neerim. The name Victoria Flats may be a later descriptor.

The purpose-designed flat or apartment building emerged as a new form of residential accommodation in Brisbane during the 1920s, and Kilroe's Flats on Gregory Terrace were amongst the earliest purpose-designed flats erected in the city, and certainly the first on Gregory Terrace, which became a popular location for blocks of flats in the later 1920s and 1930s. Brisbane, in comparison to Sydney where flat buildings were being erected from the early 1900s, was relatively slow to adopt this new form of domestic dwelling. Like most of Brisbane's purpose-designed flats, and similar to Melbourne rather than Sydney flats, Kilroe's Flats on Gregory Terrace were essentially suburban in nature: domestic in scale and design and located within a garden setting. They were unusual in that each flat had an entrance directly accessible from the street, rather than accessed from a common stairwell.

Three main types of purpose-designed flats evolved in Brisbane in the interwar period: moderate-rental blocks; prestigious and luxury flats or apartments; and the bachelor flat. Sometimes these were combined with professional chambers or shops. Kilroe's Flats, with their attractive street facades, private entrances, generously proportioned rooms, and up-to-date facilities (including built-in cupboards in the entrance, kitchen and bathroom), were clearly aimed at the higher-income, long-term rental market. The location was prestigious - situated on the high land along Gregory Terrace overlooking Victoria Park —and convenient to the Brisbane central business district.

The bulk of purpose-designed blocks of flats erected in Brisbane in the interwar period were intended as rental investments, rather than for immediate re-sale, as strata title was not available. Investors favoured centrally located positions, close to workplaces, shopping facilities, entertainment and schools, with easy access to public transport. Corner positions, which permitted plenty of opportunity to ensure flats were well lit and ventilated, were also favoured. Kilroe's Flats are early and important evidence of these considerations.

The designer of Kilroe's Flats, Scottish-trained architect Thomas Blair Moncrieff Wightman, arrived in Brisbane c. 1910 at the age of 26. He first lectured in architecture at the Brisbane Central Technical College, then was employed by architects Atkinson and McLay in 1912, and was in private practice in Brisbane by 1913 – firstly on his own, then as Wightman and Phillips from 1914 to 1918. From 1919 he practised alone until his retirement and subsequent early death c. 1933. He was a fellow of the Royal British Institute of Architects, and a councillor of the Queensland Institute of Architects (President in 1923–24, about the time he designed Kilroe's Flats).

Wightman's work was well received in Brisbane, and his residential work is considered to be important in the development of interwar domestic architecture in Queensland. He established a substantial residential practice, and attracted prestigious commissions which permitted design experimentation in adapting the traditional Queensland timber house to meet changing social and functional requirements.

Kilroe's Flats are the only purpose-built flats in Brisbane identified to date as designed by Wightman. In these flats, Wightman employed elements of domestic bungalow style in the tradition of the Queensland high-set house. The verandah spaces in particular are illustrative of changing lifestyles in Brisbane during the interwar period, when verandah widths and designs were being experimented with to permit their use as outdoor living and sleeping "rooms".

The Kilroes did not reside in their Gregory Terrace flats, and by c. 1925 had left Mirrunya, which from March 1928 they let to Lillian Leitch as a private hospital. By 1942 Mrs Kilroe had been widowed. In that year she sold Mirrunya, but retained the flats on an enlarged subdivision (resub 2 of subs 1–3 of allotment 253 – 1 rood 4.2 perches). Following Fanny Kilroe's death in 1948, the flats (building and land) were sold to Edward and Bridie Lynch in 1949. They remain with descendants of the Lynch family, and unlike many of Brisbane's interwar flats which have since been converted to strata title, are retained on a single title.

== Description ==
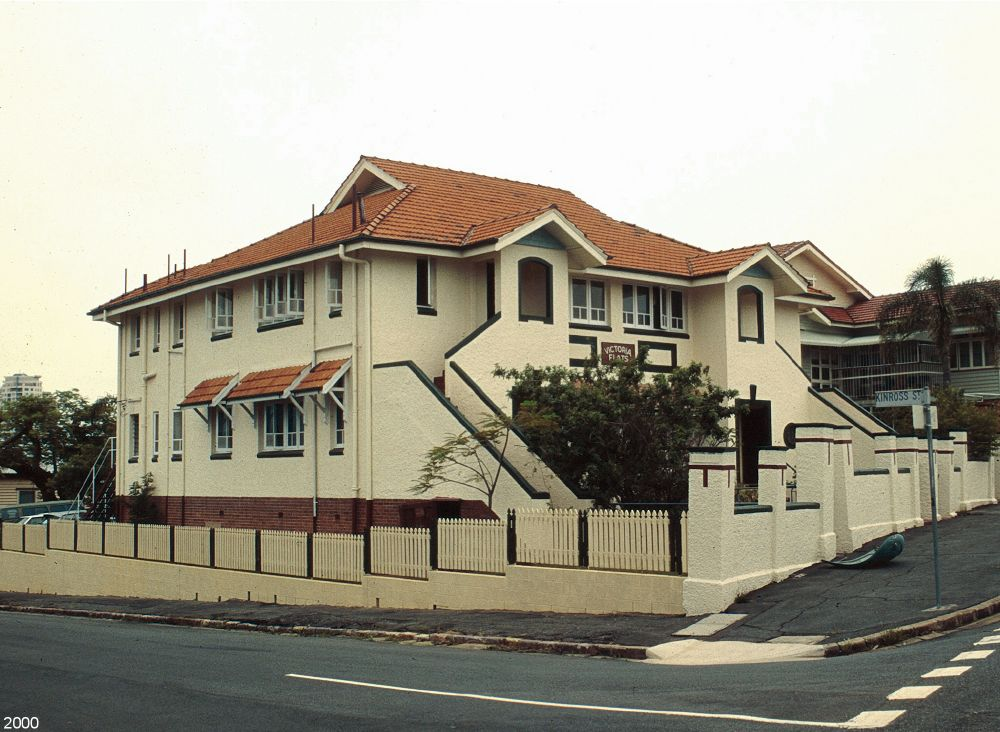
Victoria Flats, 2000

Victoria Flats are situated at the corner of Gregory Terrace and Kinross Street, Spring Hill, on the highest part of the ridge overlooking Victoria Park to the north and west. The principal elevation is to Gregory Terrace, to which the flats make a prominent streetscape contribution.

The building is domestic in scale and form. It is a two-storeyed brick building with 2 flats on each floor, each with a frontage to Gregory Terrace, and a sub-floor at the rear where the land slopes away toward Water Street The whole has a single, bungalow-style roof clad in terracotta tiles, with a short ridge and gablets at the apex, reminiscent of early 1900s houses, which unifies the building. Each flat has a separate front and rear entrance. Two symmetrically positioned, gable-roofed, external brick staircases at the front of the building give access to the two upper floor flats. At the rear, two separate external staircases also give access to the top two flats, but the original staircases have been replaced with steel framing and concrete treads. The exterior walls are finished in stucco with decorative brickwork to the window sills. Windows on the ground floor have window hoods clad with terracotta tiles.

Each flat has a separate wrought-iron entrance gate on Gregory Terrace, with individual name plate in the gate: Morella, Carinyah, Lumtah and Neerim.

Internally, each flat is identical in arrangement, other than that the two flats on each floor are mirrored in plan. Although the two upper floor flats were initially designed with a different floor plan to the lower floor flats, all have been constructed to the ground floor pattern. In each flat, a small entrance hall leads into the public spaces - a living room and dining room with windows along the side of the building, and separated by a timber arch. A bedroom opens off each of these rooms on the party-wall side. The front bedroom has a small enclosed front balcony, and off the rear bedroom, through wide French doors, is a larger enclosed sleeping verandah. Originally the kitchen was located at the front of each flat, beside the front entrance hall, and accessed from what is now the living room (formerly the dining room). At an early date, in each flat, the kitchen has been converted to a bathroom, and the bathroom, which opened off the sleeping verandah at the back, was converted to a kitchen. The present "kitchens" retain the original wall and floor tiling associated with their former function as bathrooms: black and white patterned mosaic tiles on the floor and rectangular, white ceramic tiles finished with similar listello tiles, on the walls. Next to the original bathroom (now kitchen) and also accessed from the sleeping verandah is a toilet. In each flat, a rear door opens from the sleeping verandah onto a landing, off which is a separate, externally accessed laundry.

The floors are of extremely narrow timber boards, possibly japanned originally. The public rooms have early timber panelling, and plate and picture rails with decorative timber brackets, all of which has been painted. The ceilings retain their original fibrous-cement sheeting and timber battening arranged in decorative patterns. In at least one flat, the timber battening on the ceiling retains its dark staining, but most ceilings have been repainted. In each flat, there is a small triangular coat-cupboard in the entrance hall, and early built-in cupboards in the bathroom and kitchen. There is also an early, but not original, serving hatch between what is now the dining room (formerly the living room) and what is now the kitchen (formerly the bathroom)]. Windows throughout are timber-framed casements, most retaining their original patterned, opaque glass. The front door to each flat has a decorative oval leadlight window.

The front garden is enclosed along Gregory Terrace by the original fence of rendered brick, but the retaining wall and fence along Kinross Street has been replaced (late 1990s) with a cement block and picket fence. In the backyard is a mature Jacaranda tree and a set of three timber-framed, weatherboard-clad garages with a skillion roof, recently reclad. These are accessed from Kinross Street.

== Heritage listing ==
Victoria Flats was listed on the Queensland Heritage Register on 30 March 2001 having satisfied the following criteria.

The place is important in demonstrating the evolution or pattern of Queensland's history.

Victoria Flats (Kilroe's Flats), erected c. 1923, is important in demonstrating the pattern of residential development in Brisbane during the interwar years, being among the earliest purpose-designed suburban flats constructed in Brisbane.

The place demonstrates rare, uncommon or endangered aspects of Queensland's cultural heritage.

As early surviving purpose-designed flats in Brisbane, the place is rare, and important in illustrating changing community attitudes to desirable and acceptable forms of housing. The incorporation of separate street entrances for each flat also is comparatively rare among Brisbane interwar flats.

The place is important in demonstrating the principal characteristics of a particular class of cultural places.

The place remains highly intact externally and substantially intact internally, and is important in demonstrating the principal characteristics of early, purpose-designed, middle-class flats in Brisbane - including the domestic scale, design and layout; the garden setting; the inclusion of separate entrances and separate laundries; and the attention to aesthetic detail (including leadlights in the front entrance doors, decorative timber brackets to the internal picture and plate rails in the living and dining rooms, and early decorative wall and floor tiling to the original bathrooms). In addition, the location is illustrative of many of the principal concerns of investors in up-market flats, including: accessibility to public transport, workplaces, shops, schools and entertainment; aesthetics; and good light and ventilation.

The place is important because of its aesthetic significance.

The place has aesthetic value, and makes an important contribution to the Gregory Terrace streetscape.

The place has a special association with the life or work of a particular person, group or organisation of importance in Queensland's history.

The place has an important association with the work of Brisbane architect TBM Wightman, who was influential in the development of domestic architecture in Brisbane during the interwar years, and is the only purpose-designed block of flats identified to date as having been designed by him.
