= Brisbane Grammar School Buildings =

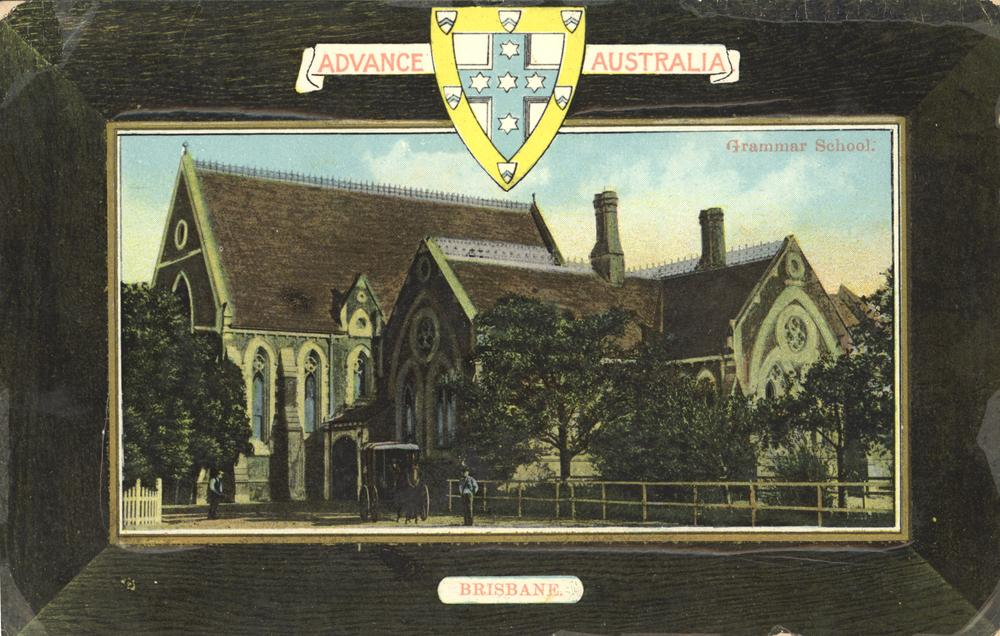
- Great Hall, Brisbane Grammar School

- Location within Queensland
- 27.4598°S 153.0171°E
- Location: 24 Gregory Terrace, Spring Hill, City of Brisbane, Queensland, Australia

History
- Design period: 1900–1914 (early 20th century)
- Built: 1902

Site notes
- Architect(s): James Cowlishaw, Richard Gailey, Robin Dods, George David Payne
- Architectural style: Gothic

Queensland Heritage Register
- Official name: Brisbane Grammar School
- Type: state heritage (built)
- Designated: 21 August 1992
- Reference no.: 600124
- Significant period: 1870s–1900s (historical); 1879–ongoing (social) main building: 1879–1925 (fabric) school house: 1870

Brisbane Grammar School Buildings are a heritage-listed group of private school buildings of Brisbane Grammar School, 24 Gregory Terrace, Spring Hill, City of Brisbane, Queensland, Australia. They were added to the Queensland Heritage Register on 21 August 1992.

== History ==
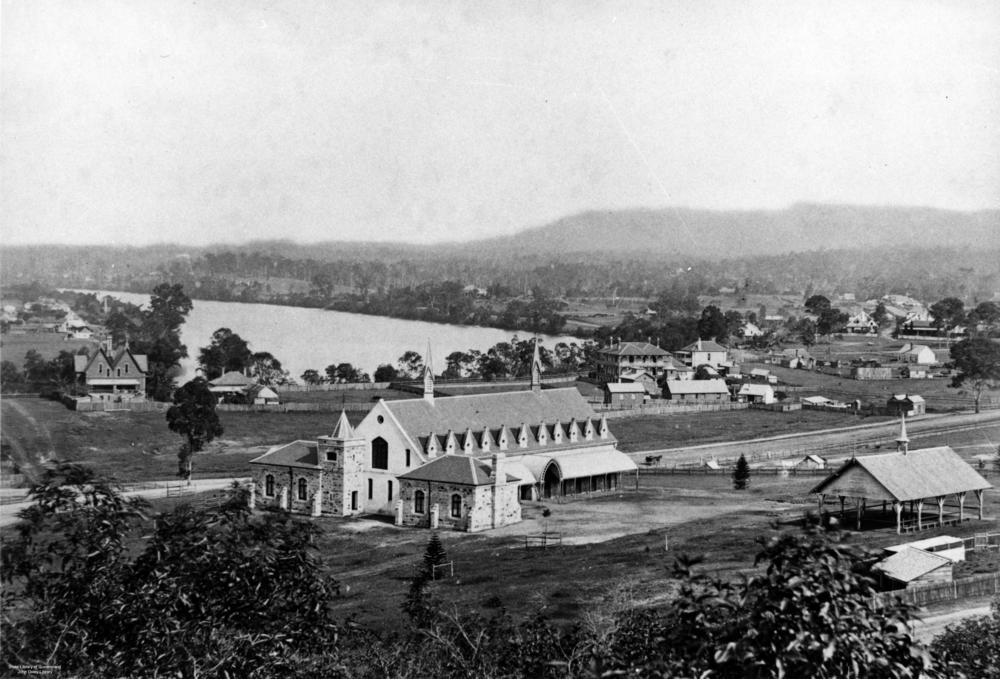
Original Brisbane Grammar School at Roma Street, 1874

The Brisbane Grammar School, constituted under the Grammar School Act 1860–1864, was officially opened on 1 February 1869 under the headmastership of Thomas Harlin. It was the second Grammar School established in Queensland under the 1860 Grammar Schools Act (Ipswich Grammar School was the first).

The first buildings designed by architect Benjamin Backhouse with later additions by Richard George Suter were erected on a site along Roma Street and were demolished in 1911.

Following the expansion of the railway network, the school moved to the present site on Gregory Terrace. The foundation stone was laid by the Chairman of Trustees, Hon Charles Lilley on 28 November 1879. The site granted by the Queensland Government in 1878 was bounded on three sides by Gregory Terrace, College Road (then known as New Road), and the railway line. In addition the School was granted by the government a piece of land across the railway line for a sporting ground and a corresponding area was excised from the south west corner of the Gregory Terrace site.

Arranging of the drive and tree planting including the planting of an avenue of Moreton Bay figs along the main drive was carried out at the new site by School Trustee and founding member of the Acclimatisation Society Lewis Adolphus Bernays. In 1918 the figs on the northern side of the drive were replaced by cocos palms. In 1881, students moved to the new school. The Main Building, comprising the Great Hall with single storeyed wings of classrooms on either side, was designed by architect James Cowlishaw. It was built to face College Road, overlooking the city and the old school. In the same year two Moreton Bay figs were planted by Prince Albert and Prince George (later King George V) in the drive.

Not until the opening in 1887 of the School House, designed by architect Richard Gailey, was accommodation provided for boarders within the school grounds. The three storeyed School House also provided accommodation for headmaster, Reginald Heber Roe and his family. In 1909 Roe resigned to become the Inspector General and Chief Educational Advisor in the Department of Public Instruction and former deputy Frederick Sydney Newman Bousfield became headmaster. In the same year, additions and alterations by architect George David Payne were carried out to the School House. Payne, who was the father of two boys at the school, was also responsible for the 1912 additions to the Main Building comprising a chemistry laboratory and physics laboratory which were erected at a cost of less than £6,000 and for the New Building erected in 1916 by the Works Department at a cost of £4,983. At this time levelling of the hill wicket was carried out. Later, in 1925 the Works Department carried out further work at the school with the addition of a second floor to the classroom wings of the Main Building.

On 11 August 1921, a World War I trophy, a "German" field gun – actually an Austro-Hungarian 10.4 cm Feldkanone M. 15 which had been taken from the Ottoman Army at the Capture of Jenin in 1918 – donated to the school by old boy, Brigadier General Lachlan Chisholm Wilson, was unveiled.

The War Memorial Library was opened on Armistice Day 1924 by Queensland Governor Matthew Nathan. Built as a memorial to some 1,020 members of the School who served during World War I, it was erected to the design of architect John Barr, who had succeeded in a competition held amongst old boys of the school and subscribers to the War Memorial fund.

In 1928, former deputy Stuart Stephenson was appointed Headmaster and an appeal was launched to transform the Hill Wicket into a new turf cricket ground. The new turf which was levelled under the unemployment scheme was opened in 1932. In 1931 part of the oval was excised for the making of Gilcrest Avenue and in return the school was granted a portion of Victoria Park. With the depression, direct government funding and indirect funding via state scholarships was reduced. In the mid-1930s various improvements financed by government grant were undertaken and Brisbane City Council workmen beautified the approach and entrance to the school grounds with gardens, lawns, and rockeries.

Old boy George Carson-Cooling was appointed Headmaster in 1940 and was followed by Henry Robert Pigott in 1948. The oval across Gilcrest Avenue was leased from 1948–1966 to Ballymore. In the early 1950s beautification of the grounds was undertaken including planting shrubs on the frontage facing Brisbane; levelling part of the entrance road; making gardens at the gate and around the School House; a low stone wall and garden beds were made by fathers in 1955 to the College Road entrance; a start was made on filling up part of "no man's land" between boys and girls school to make a new playing field; and the main football ground was extended to full size with space for a running track and miniature rifle range.

In 1953, Allen Ernest McLucas was appointed Headmaster. In that year the Frank Walker Gymnasium was opened and in the following year, the Old Boys Second World War Memorial Swimming Pool was opened.

Harold Frederick Newell was appointed head in 1956. New entrance gates were erected in 1959 and a new science block opened in 1960. In 1961 a players pavilion was erected on the oval and in the following year the headmaster moved from the School House to a brick residence erected in the grounds. In 1963, a wing of four classrooms was added to the Main Building and the Newell Quadrangle was completed by the following year.

The Centenary Building Project was announced in 1964. It included the building of the Centennial Hall and the library. Other work included the construction of Advanced Science Laboratories (1965); the conversion of the Science Wing into administration offices and masters common room (1966), the Manual Training Building (1967); additions to the School House (1972); the Humanities Building (1975); the addition of two floors to the Manual Training Building to become the Language Laboratory (1981); and the Music Auditorium (1982).

In 1982 the permanent closure of Kalinga Avenue between the Brisbane Grammar School and Brisbane Girls Grammar School was granted. In 1992, the Old Correspondence School, located on what was intended as part of the original endowment land, was purchased from the Queensland Government.

=== Main Building ===
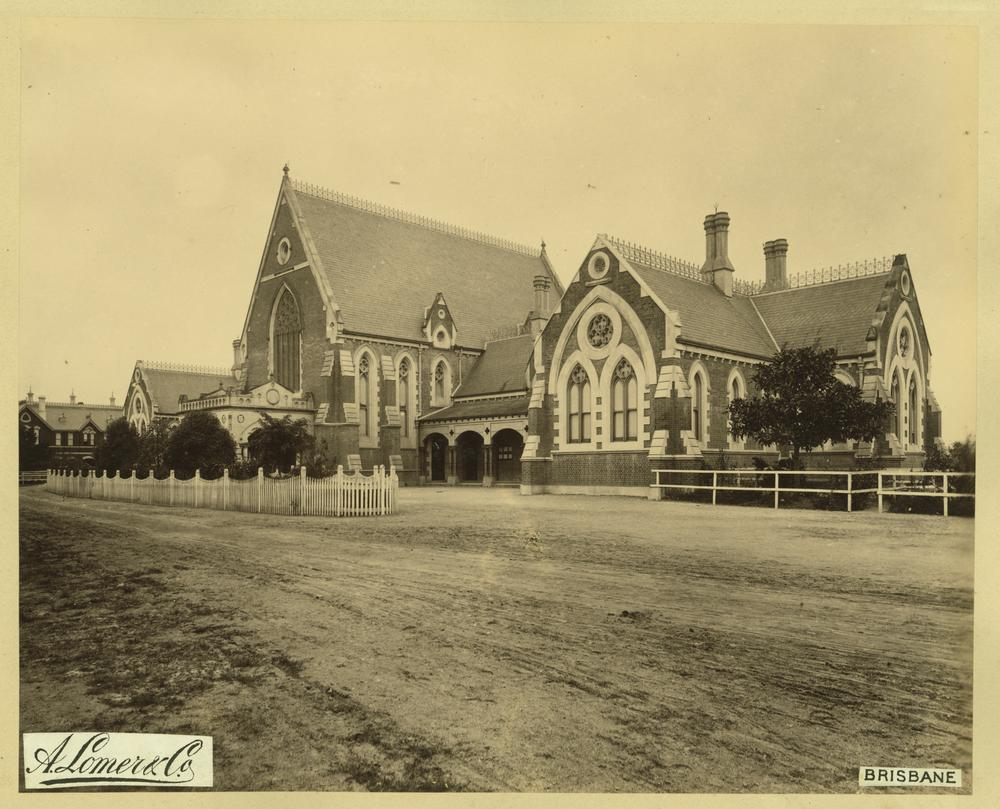
Main Building, 1889

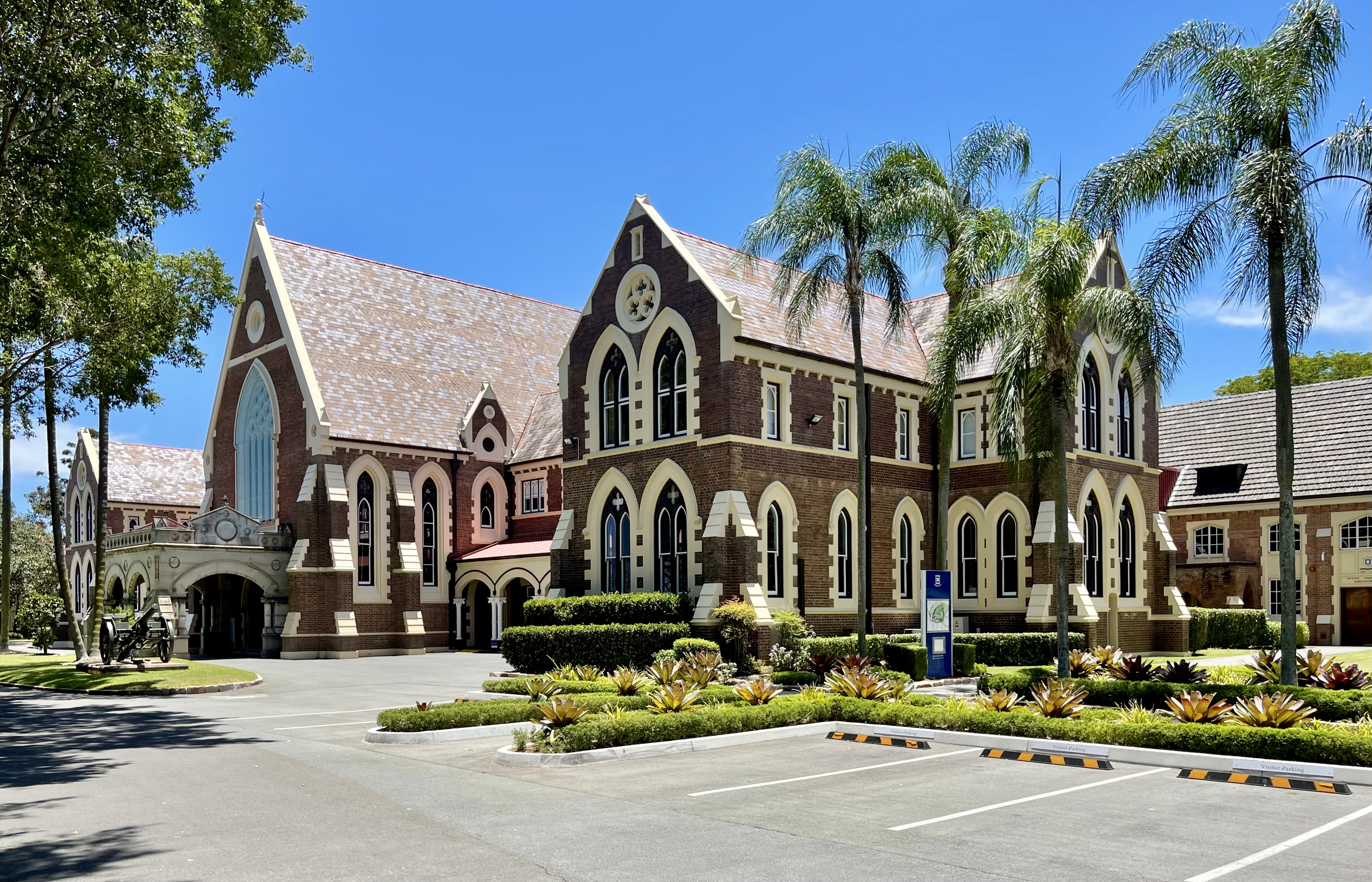
Main Building, 2020

The Main Building, comprising the Great Hall and classroom wings, was designed by architect James Cowlishaw and erected in 1880 with a second floor added to the classroom wings by the Public Works Department in 1925. It was the first building to be erected at the Brisbane Grammar School's new Gregory Terrace site.

With the expansion of the Roma Street railway yards, the school was forced to move to a new location selected on Gregory Terrace. On 28 November 1879 the foundation stone was laid by Chairman of Trustees and school benefactor, the Hon Charles Lilley.

By 1881, the new building costing some £12,000, had been completed by contractor, W MacFarlane. A detached wooden cottage was also erected for the caretaker and included a dining room for the pupils. Like the Main Building, this featured the use of the quatrefoil motif. The new school overlooked both the old school site and the city. Its hill top location was considered salubrious and picturesque. Cowlishaw's Collegiate Gothic design provided for a large central hall, with single storeyed classroom wings on either side. It was brick and roofed with banded Bangor slates with cast iron cresting on the ridges.

The main entry, facing the city, was by a covered carriage porch of Oamaru stone bearing a number of carvings, and which led to the Great Hall. Inside, the ceiling was coloured sky blue and decorated with hundreds of gold stars. Soon after the opening the large stained glass windows, funded by subscriptions, were installed. Made by Ferguson and Urie of Melbourne, they are thought to be the earliest Australian produced windows in Queensland. Both windows are used to portray the ideals of the school. The northern window shows a young Queen Victoria flanked by men famous in British history, including maritime and military leaders, statesmen, poets, playwrights, and men of science, who look down on the boys inviting them to "emulate their noble deeds". The theme of the southern grisaille window speaks of the rewards bestowed by the Crown for loyalty and service. On either side of the Great Hall were the class room wings including Headmaster's office and science laboratory. As in the Great Hall, the ceilings and rafters of these rooms were coloured.

In 1912, the Science Wing comprising chemistry and physics laboratories was added to the eastern wing by architect GD Payne. Major additions were undertaken in 1925, when a second floor containing ten new classrooms was added to what had previously been the single storeyed class room wings. In 1924, in response to rising enrolments, the Trustees of the school wrote to the Queensland Government Architect requesting that plans be prepared for eight additional classrooms. A proposal to extend the New Building was considered by the Public Works Department where the Chief Architect at the time was William James Ewart, an old boy. In the following year the plan was rejected in favour of a proposal by old-boy architect Arnold Edwin Brooks, to add the second floor. The proposal was considered by the Trustees to further dignify the architectural beauty of the building. It was also considered cheaper than the erection of a separate building. Leonard James Kempster of the Public Works Department modified that proposal to enable the existing ground floor to be altered as little as possible thereby retaining the ground floor. The work, which cost £11,290 involved the raising of the existing roof to form the roof of the second storey and included the removal of fireplaces and chimneys and the replacement of the slate tiled roof.

In 1935, under architect Thomas Ramsay Hall, an old boy, the slate roof of the Great Hall was renewed and the outside walls repaired. The stained glass window designed by William Bustard and executed by RS Exton was unveiled in 1951. It was donated by the Old Boys in memory of Maud Carson-Cooling, the wife of Headmaster George Carson-Cooling. Various works were undertaken during the mid-1950s, under the supervision of Professor Robert Percy Cummings including the repair of the roof of the main building, the renovation of the cloisters, the releading of the stained glass windows of the Great Hall; and the repainting of the interior of the Hall in an array of colours including the 500 gold stars on the ceiling.

In response to changes in education policy, in 1963, a two-storeyed addition was made to the western wing consisting of 4 classrooms to accommodate what amounted to a double intake for the following year.

Lining the walls of the Great Hall are a number of honour boards and memorials. These include a bronze memorial plate designed by old-boy architect Robin Dods in 1897 in memory of school benefactor Sir Charles Lilley. In 1902 Dods also designed the cedar TJ Byrnes Honour Board, erected in memory of an old boy and former Premier of Queensland, Thomas Joseph Byrnes. In 1938, the Honour Board was extended with two lateral wings to Dods' original design. In 1916, an Honour Board, designed by TR Hall containing the names of 640 old boys who joined the Imperial forces during World War I was unveiled together with tablets to Lt Colonel Hubert Jennings Imrie Harris and Captain Thomas Joseph Brundrit. In 1949, the World War II honour board, designed by old-boy architect Dean Stocker Prangley, was unveiled. In the 1950s reorganisation of the interior of the Hall to accommodate the various memorials was carried out including the moving of the TJ Byrnes Honour Board.

Although now too small for entire gatherings of the school, the Great Hall remains a central symbol of it. The original classrooms are predominantly used as staff rooms.

=== School House ===
The School House is a three storeyed brick building designed by architect Richard Gailey, and erected in 1887 to provide on site accommodation for boarders as well as a Headmaster's residence.

Prior to the erection of the School House, boarders at the School were housed off the school grounds, in the residences of masters and later nearby the residence of Headmaster Roe. In about 1883 plans for a boarding house were prepared by the architect of the Main Building, James Cowlishaw. Cowlishaw's proposal was not proceeded with, however, as the estimated cost of £8,500 exceeded the budget by some £2,500. Cowlishaw did however recommend to the Trustees that his former Clerk of Works, Richard Gailey be approached.

Gailey's plans forwarded to the School in September 1885 provided for a three storeyed red-and-white brick building. The headmaster's residence occupied the main floor; with service and dining areas in the lower floor and the boys housed on the top floor which was divided into numerous cubicles. Gailey's planning of the entries to the School House was strategic. Access by the boys to the building was via a bridge to the headmasters residence on the main floor from where the staircase lead to the floors above and below, giving the Headmaster complete control over the movement of his charges. Separate entry to the Headmaster's residence was provided from the southern side of the building. A Treasury loan of some £8,000 was made for the erection of the School House which was opened in January 1887, the contractor being H Holmes (£6,950).

In 1909, architect and father of two Brisbane Grammar School boys, GD Payne was commissioned to design alterations and additions to the School House. This was to be the first of Payne's works for the school. Later he was to design the Science Wing added to the Main Building and the New Building. His work to the School House included a single-storeyed timber-framed building for servants' accommodation and ancillary facilities; on the lower story a larger dining room where the matron, laundry and common room were previously located; conversion of the former dining room to boys' prep room and former servants' quarters into additional study area, and the addition of single storeyed timber framed verandah to the northern end of the building housing a store, larder, and dairy. Alterations to the main and top floor, consisting of conversion of part of the headmaster's residence into boys' dormitory accommodation, and on the upper floor rearrangement of partitions and upgrading of showers and lavatories, may also have been carried out at this time, but were certainly completed by 1925.

During the 1930s the School House was repainted and improvements carried out. In the 1950s the slate roof was replaced by tiles. In 1962, a separate house was erected for the Headmaster and the headmaster moved from the School House. In 1972, the three-storeyed reinforced-concrete dormitory wing, erected on the northern end of the School House by architect Colin Trapp, was opened.

=== Administration Building ===
The Administration Building is a two storeyed brick building adjoining the eastern classroom wing of the Main Building, which was erected as a science block in 1912 the design of architect GD Payne.

The Main Building erected in 1880 contained a science laboratory; however the Science Wing was intended for the "more thorough experimental teaching of science". The Science Wing was the first classroom addition carried out at the school since its opening at the Gregory Terrace site. George Payne was also to be responsible for the design of further school buildings with the erection of the New Building in 1916. In 1909 Payne, who had two boys at the school, had also designed additions and alterations to the School House.

Payne's Science Wing was a contemporary and complementary interpretation of Cowlishaw's Collegiate Gothic building, in brick with light-coloured dressings, and high pointed arch coloured and leaded pane windows. It contained a large chemistry laboratory and smaller physics laboratory with timber galleries. These classrooms were impressive double-storey height spaces with exposed roof structures, and clerestory lighting and ventilation.

The cost of £6,000 was funded by the selling of endowment lands and a grant from Treasury for equipment. The Science Wing was opened on 26 July 1912 by the Governor Sir William MacGregor, a strong supporter of education and the advancement of science, and the school's Visitor.

In 1928 a bellcote designed by architect AE Brooks, an old boy, was erected by the Old Boys of the school in memory of school janitor and ringer of bells, George Rylatt.

A water fountain designed by architect TR Hall, an old boy, was erected to the south of the building in memory of Graham Murray Lumsden, who was killed during World War II. This was moved to the eastern side in 1964.

As part of the school's centenary building program, Payne's Science Wing was converted into an Administration Building by school architect Colin Trapp. The new work was opened in 1966.

=== New Building ===
The New Building, a two storeyed brick building designed for the Trustees of the Brisbane Grammar School by Architect GD Payne, was erected by the Public Works Department in 1916 at a cost of some £5000 on the northern side of the Main Building overlooking the oval.

The New Building (as it is still known) was erected in response to the increasing numbers of enrolments at the School. Like other Grammar Schools, the Brisbane Grammar School was largely dependent for its enrolments on boys who were in receipt of State Scholarships. In 1914, a change in the policy of the awarding of those Scholarships occurred resulting in an increasing number of recipients and hence an increasing number of enrolments at the school. In response to this increase, the Trustees requested the Government to erect extra class room accommodation and forwarded a proposal by school architect GD Payne.

Payne, who had two boys at the School, had already designed additions to the School House as well as the Science Wing added to the Main Building in 1912. His sketch plans show a two-storeyed building containing eight classrooms (including a chemistry and physics laboratory) connected by a covered way to a block of toilets. He proposed a timber building with fibro cement linings and a roof of red fibro cement slates with the cost including retaining wall to be £3480. Payne's siting of the proposed new building took advantage of the aspect offered to the north as well as visually linking the Main Building and the later Science Wing, whilst maintaining the primacy of the Main Building.

Funding for the new building was to be provided by the government and responsibility for its erection passed to the Public Works Department. Some modifications were made to Payne's plans in 1914 by the Public Works Department; however Payne's scheme was substantially retained including his selected site. Works Department drawings by Harold James Parr included a central corridor and stair and some changes to the size of rooms. Costings were prepared by the department for both a brick (£5,500) and a timber (£4,000) building; however in September 1914 tenders were called for the erection of the brick building. The contractor for the works carried out during 1915 was John MacArthur of Toowong with joinery by Pattersons of Toowong and tiles and cement ceilings by Ladgrove.

In 1954, the repainting of the New Building was supervised by Professor Cumming, who was also responsible for the colour scheme at the Great Hall. Cumming's colour scheme was described by the school magazine as being something out of the ordinary and of an almost bewildering diversity.

With the extensions of the oval during the 1950s, the verandahs of the New Building became and remain a grandstand for spectators of school sporting events about this time. The classrooms, particularly those on the ends of the upper floor are regarded as the best in the School.

=== War Memorial Library ===
The Memorial Library, erected to the design of architect John Barr, an old boy, as a memorial to old boys who served in World War I, was opened on Armistice Day 1924.

On 14 August 1916, an Honour Board, which at that time recorded the names of 640 old boys who joined the Imperial Forces during the Great War, was unveiled in the Great Hall. On that day a meeting was held at which it was resolved to erect a more substantial memorial and subscriptions were opened. The War Memorial Building Committee, chaired by the Chairman of Trustees, John Laskey Woolcock was formed, and the canvassing for funds was commenced but soon deferred due to the Federal War Precautions Act which required the conservation of resources for the war effort.

Various forms of memorial were considered by the committee. Unable to erect a chapel, due to the constraints of the Grammar School Act, the subscribers chose a useful monument, a library. In 1919, on the recommendation of a subcommittee consisting of Edward Robert Crouch, Thomas Ramsay Hall, and Henry Wallace Atkinson, it was decided that a building of "approved Gothic design" be erected in the school grounds to be used as a war record room and library. The site chosen by the subcommittee was on the south side of the drive facing College Road; however this was changed in October 1920 to the existing site so as to save costs on the foundations. At this time a number of architects, who were either old boys of the school or subscribers to the fund were approached for designs. Their brief required a building of Gothic 13th/14th century design with two lancet windows in each face with medallion or three lancet windows in each face with the windows to start from 7 to 8 feet (2.1 to 2.4 m) above floor level. Architect GHM Addison was enlisted to consider five of the eight schemes submitted. Addison recommended the scheme submitted by John Barr be awarded first prize, with an entry by Ronald Martin Wilson awarded second prize.

Barr was in practice in New South Wales. He designed the old Fisher Library (now the Nicholson Museum) and later was to win another memorial competition, this time at the Melbourne Grammar School. As Barr was resident in Sydney, he arranged for another old boy and former pupil of Addison, architect AE Brooks, to supervise the construction of the building.

Tenders for the erection of the building were first called in February 1923; however no tender was accepted and tenders were recalled with some modifications of the original plan in April. The tender of Peter Frew of £4385 was accepted which provided for the substitution of concrete for freestone in parapets, iron for copper dormers, and solid walls in place of hollow.

On Anzac Day 1923, the foundation stone was laid by the School Visitor and State Governor, Sir Matthew Nathan. Beneath the stone was buried the same bottle as was placed under the foundation stone of the original school in Roma Street in 1868.

In December 1923 the committee resolved that a uniform design for the stained glass windows be adopted with the window over the doorway to be representative of Victory (Saint George) and over the opposite door to be representative of Peace. Those windows were subscribed to by the Trustees and the Old Boys Association respectively. The other chivalric virtues chosen by the committee to be represented in the windows were justice, magnanimity, courtesy, honour, service, fortitude, reverence, loyalty, duty, and truth. These were subscribed to by families and others in memory of sons, brothers, and friends and were designed and executed by Charles Edward Tute.

Tute is also believed to have executed the library furniture which was probably designed by Barr. It included four bookcases to stand at right angles to piers, six benches and tables, six chairs, and the Crystal Cabinet, which housed the Golden Book, comprising four volumes bound in brown Moroccan leather by the Government Printer. The Book records, on pages framed with red Flanders poppies drawn by one of the daughters of Headmaster Roe, Madge Roe, the names of 1,020 Brisbane Grammar School volunteers as written by the President of the Old Boys Association, CB Fox. An octagonal display case was also made by long-time master, Alfred John Mason.

The memorial was intended to house a great reference library and books were donated in memory of the fallen. Other books donated included signed volumes written by old boys. Signed photographs of wartime political and military leaders from various parts of the Empire were also sought and placed around the walls.

Many of the original contents of the library are still in the possession of the school or have been reacquired. The War Memorial Library is now maintained by the school as a memorial and museum.

=== Old Correspondence School ===
The Old Correspondence School is a two storeyed red brick building erected in 1899 by the Works Department for the Department of Agriculture for use as a Stock Institute, and was acquired by the Brisbane Grammar School from the Queensland Government in 1992.

The Queensland Stock Institute was established as part of the Stock Branch of the Colonial Secretary's Department in 1893 to research the nature and origin of stock diseases and to develop preventative measures against these. It was the first Stock Institute in Australia. The first premises of the Institute were in Turbot Street, Brisbane. The first Director, microbiologist, Charles Joseph Pound was known for his work on various animal and human diseases, most particularly for his work on tick fever. In 1897 the Stock Branch was transferred to the Department of Agriculture where Pound renewed his complaints regarding the unsuitability of the Turbot Street building.

By the following year, plans for new premises had been completed by the Public Works Department. The new building erected on College Road by contractor William Herd for £1,800, contained on the ground floor, laboratories and a photographic room and on the second floor, a museum, and a lecture and specimen room. An animal yard containing sheds and stalls was erected at the rear. To the front, timber steps were constructed leading down to College Road.

The new site provided the Stock Institute with a prominent position overlooking the city with ready access to transport, both rail and road. The site adjoined the Brisbane Grammar School and had been intended to form part of the 1878 grant to the Trustees of the Brisbane Grammar School. In 1877, it was excised from the proposed grant and exchanged for land more suitable for use as a sports ground.

In 1901 the Stock Institute was transferred to the Home Secretary's Department. In that year a timber post mortem room and more stables and sheds were built in the grounds. Now known as the Bacteriological Institute, with Charles Pound as the Government Bacteriologist, its work included research into human diseases, the examination of water samples, and the preparation of pathological samples. During the plague epidemics of the first decade of the 20th century plague work was undertaken, and complaints were received from the adjoining Grammar School regarding the hazards of keeping rats on premises so close to the school's boarding house.

In 1907, the Bacteriological Institute was returned to the newly renamed Department of Agriculture and Stock although work was still done for the Health Department. Sydney Dodd was appointed Principal Veterinary Surgeon and Bacteriologist. Under pressure from the Queensland branch of the British Medical Association the institute was again transferred to the Health Department in 1909 where it became the Laboratory of Pathology and Microbiology under the directorship of Dr John D Harris. Work continued on research into human diseases, including during World War I, work on the epidemics of meningitis in army camps. All stock related work was undertaken at the newly established Stock Experiment Station at Yeerongpilly. In 1918 the Laboratory relocated to the Old Police Court at South Brisbane. In that year the Queensland Hookworm Campaign was established and soon after the Normanby building became the central office of the campaign under director Dr WA Sawyer.

In 1925 the building was converted for use by the Irrigation and Water Supply Commission. A three-storeyed wing designed by the Public Works Department was added at the rear of the building by day labour at a cost of £4,500. The addition included in the basement, a printing room and strong rooms.

In 1932, the building was converted for the used of the Primary Correspondence School. The school commenced on 1 February 1922 to provide primary school education for children in remote areas. The school was initially based at the Central Technical College with an enrolment of 37 pupils, but in September of that year moved to the former Trades Hall. During World War II, when wartime conditions made it impossible for many children to attend school, enrolments in the Primary Correspondence School rose to a peak of 11,000 with a staff of 150. After the war, the PCS also assisted in establishing rehabilitation schemes for returned service people. With closer settlement, improved transport and provision of more schools, enrolments of the school once known as the biggest in the southern hemisphere, began to decline.

The Primary Correspondence School vacated the building in 1979 but remained in use by the Education Department until 1992, when it was acquired by Brisbane Grammar School and renamed the S.W. Griffith Building.

== Description ==
The Brisbane Grammar School is sited on the crest of a ridge that overlooks Albert Park and Roma Street Railway yards to the south, and Victoria Park and Kelvin Grove to the north; the site is bounded by College Road, Gregory Terrace, and the North Coast railway line, and has its main entrance from Gregory Terrace.

The siting and architectural character of buildings at Boys Grammar School reinforce a hierarchy of buildings of primary and secondary importance. The "primary" buildings include the Main Building (1879), the Administration Building (1912) and War Memorial Library (1923), which form a collection of brick Collegiate Gothic buildings with pale masonry dressings and pitched roofs at the centre of the school. They are sited on highest point of the school grounds, a finger-shaped plateau which runs westwards from Gregory Terrace. The central buildings are encircled by "secondary" buildings which are classrooms and boarder accommodation to the north and the east, sited on the sides of slopes which fall way from the central plateau. These include brick, pitched roof buildings which are complementary in character to the central buildings: the School House (1887), the New Building (1916) and the more recently acquired Correspondence School (1899). The Sports Grounds extend towards the north west at a lower terraced level which has been cut out of the side of the hill. The south of the school is screened from the road with a vegetated embankment. The recent entrance driveway from Gregory Terrace and the symmetrical grouping of new buildings around the axis of the War Memorial Library contrasts with the picturesque grouping of the buildings as seen from the earlier entrance driveway.

The grounds contain a number of memorial objects; the "German" field gun to the south of the Main Building, an octagonal sandstone memorial drinking fountain to the east of the Administration Building, and several plaques to the buildings' exteriors. The grounds also contain a double-storeyed brick and corrugated iron roofed toilet block, sited on an escarpment to the northwest of the Main Building. It has rendered concrete lintels, unglazed high-set openings and a rendered masonry portico.

Vegetation features within the grounds include: remains of an avenue of Moreton Bay figs which once led from the school gates to the main buildings (planted 1879); a row of palms which supplanted some of the figs (planted 1918); three "royal trees" (two planted in 1881 and one in 1968); four pines, seeds of which came from the Lone Pine at Gallipoli on the bank near the "German" field gun (planted in 1978), several figs to the south west entrance to the oval (1941), and a number of trees planted or donated by eminent people associated with the school.

A pair of steel gates hinged from brick posts are located on the south eastern boundary of the school; these gates mark an entry that is no longer in use. A porphyry square-necked rubble wall runs along part of the southern boundary.

The Brisbane Grammar School forms an unusually intact collection of buildings, notable for the coherent architectural character and siting logic that has been developed and largely maintained over the years.

=== Main Building ===
Sited centrally on the school's highest plateau, with its principal frontage to College Road, the Main Building is a double-storeyed brick Gothic building with rendered masonry and cement dressings and a slate tiled pitched roof. It is a symmetrical building consisting of central Great Hall rising above and flanked by two classroom wings. The wings have a cruciform plan, and their long axes run east–west; the Great Hall runs north–south and has an Oamaru stone porch to its south. The building has been extended to the north with a Science Wing (1912) to the eastern end and new classrooms (1963) to the western end.

The roof is a series of intersecting pitches which run concurrent with the long axes of the rooms below, and is decorated with a band of fish-tailed slates.

The southern frontage to College Road has three double-storeyed projecting bays with parapeted gables and corner buttresses to the Great Hall and end classrooms. The eastern and western frontages have single, central double-storeyed projecting bays, also with corner buttresses and parapeted gables.

To the north, only the projecting bay of the Great Hall remains visible.

To the south, the projecting bays are spaced with an arcaded awning to the ground floor with a sheet metal roof, rendered masonry spandrels and paired cast iron columns with Collegiate Gothic capitals. The Oamaru stone porch, a single-storeyed aedicule, has arched entry ways to the east and west, surmounted by pediments and flanked by paired half columns, and two arched openings to the south. The columns capitals are richly carved with oak, holly and shamrock leaf motifs. The cornice, pediment and balustrade feature quatrefoil motifs.

The northern frontage has timber verandahs giving access to first level classrooms, with squared sheeted spandrel panels, and supported on paired columns with foliate capitals. The verandahs have battened balustrades, raked timber ceilings to the upper level and ripple iron ceilings to ground level. Part of the verandah to the east has been closed in with fibre cement sheeting.

The projecting bays to the south, east and west have pairs of pointed arch tracery windows with single rosettes above, with a single larger tracery window to the northern and southern end of the Great Hall. Rectangular windows with pointed arch motifs run between the projecting bays, and the rooms are accessed via timber double doors. Rendered masonry dressings include toothed window surrounds, hood mouldings, cornices with dentils, and copings.

The upper level classrooms at the ends of the east and west wings feature timber arched braced trusses springing from semi-circular impost blocks, diagonally boarded timber ceilings with exposed rafters, and timber cornices with quatrefoil motifs. The four classrooms either side of the Great hall on the upper floor and several on the ground floor have sheeted ceilings with dark timber coverstrips.

The Great Hall is spanned by similar but more elaborately decorated arched timber trusses to those found in the classrooms, also landing on semi-circular impost blocks. It has a diagonally boarded timber ceiling with exposed rafters and purlins, finished with a timber cornice with pierced motifs. The interior features two large stained glass windows, one at each end of the hall, and one to each side amongst a run of lancet windows. The entrances to the south, east and west have pointed arch cedar double doors. The doors and windows have mouldings, and a stepped dado moulding decorates the north and south walls. The Great Hall contains a number of memorial plaques, and WWI and WWII honour rolls.

This impressive primary building of the Grammar School group remains substantially intact in form and detail, retaining its well-crafted features, in particular the upper level classroom and Great Hall interiors, and the Oamaru stone porch.

=== School House ===
The School House is a three-storeyed, Gothic-influenced painted brick building, sited on a slope to the west of the Main Building. It has a red terracotta tiled roof, consisting of a central, low pitched hipped portion and more steeply pitched edges intersected by gables. A 1972 boarding house directly adjoins the School House to the north. The building has a rectangular plan, and is entered from the west on the ground floor, and the north, south and east on the first floor. A small loggia connects to the eastern entrance. To the ground and first floors, rooms are accessed from cruciform corridors with stairs to the west and the south. The intersection of the corridors are decorated with rendered masonry arches, and many of the ceilings are timber-boarded. The first floor bay windows are framed internally by a flat arch.

The upper floor is an impressive space with exposed timber trusses which span the width of the building. The gable ends of the exterior are expressed internally in the timber-lined ceiling.

The exterior has two differing expressions, the eastern and western elevations having an "institutional" appearance in comparison to the more domestically scaled southern facade designed as the entrance (previously the headmaster's residence). The eastern and western elevations are symmetrical compositions of gabled bays and paired windows, while the southern elevation features a 1 1/2-storey entry portico with a gable end on the wall above, flanked by bay windows with small tiled roofs.

The building has triangular head windows to the upper storey, arched windows to the first floor, and windows with slightly flatter arches to the ground floor. Each gable end has a rounded triangular vent at its peak. The elevations are linked horizontally with projecting brick courses running at floor and sill level. These brick courses consist of diagonally-placed brick ends under a projecting course, framing rectangular motifs.

The School House is an integral part of the Grammar School group, exhibiting fine architectural qualities in the composition and brickwork detailing of its exterior, and its impressive interior space to the upper level.

=== Administration Building ===
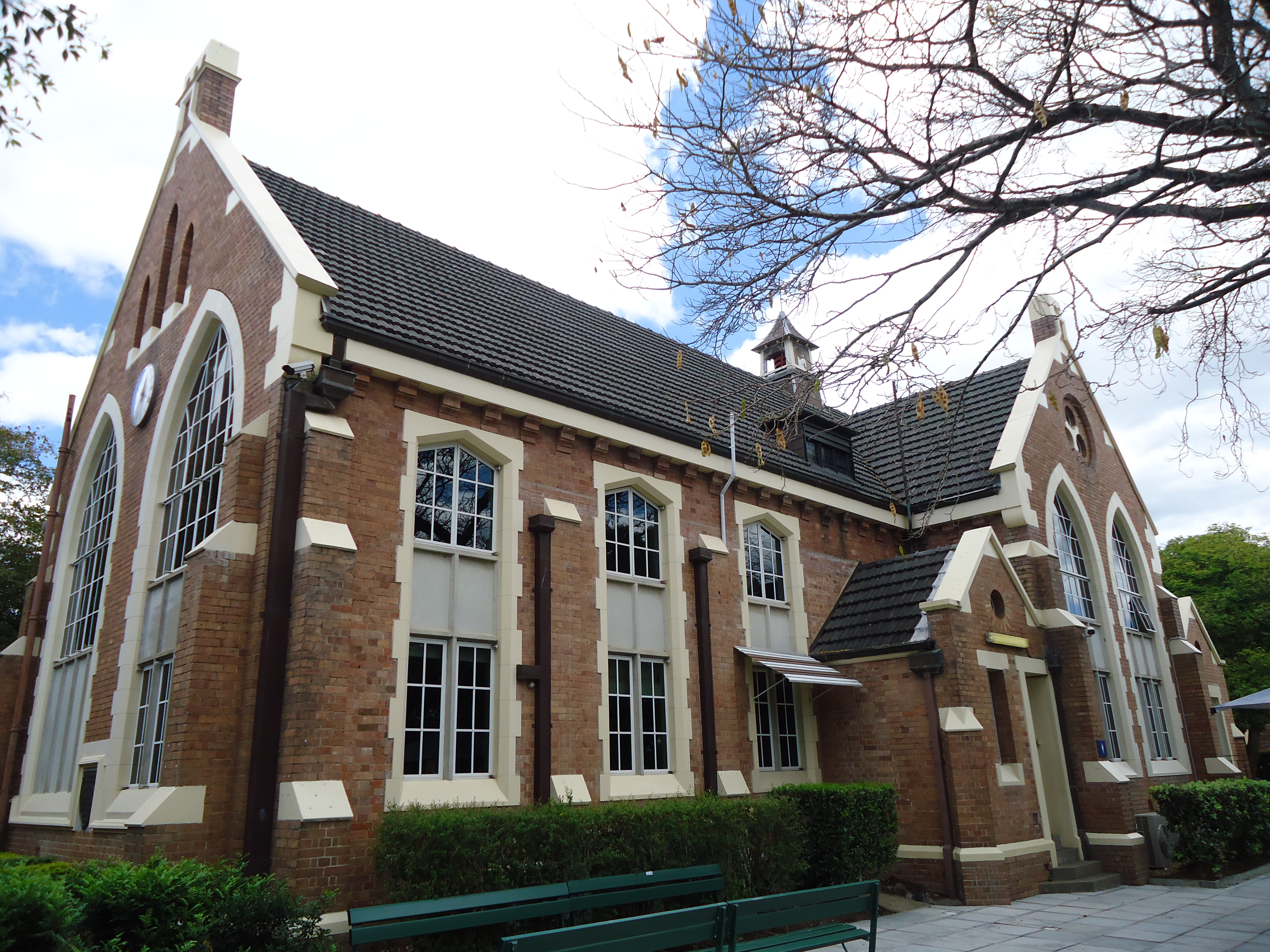
Administration Building (formerly Science Building), 2011

The Science Wing is a two-storeyed Collegiate Gothic building adjoining the eastern wing of the Main Building to the north. Complementing the Main Building in form, the Science Wing is made of brick with light masonry dressings, and employs a similar formal language of parapeted gabled bays with corners buttresses to the north, east and west. It has a pitched tiled roof, with a pyramidal fleche rising above the roof line.

The western and eastern elevations consist of single gable ends, with two large pointed arch windows surmounted by three small lancets. The western elevation has a memorial bell-cote, set in a rendered masonry surround with bell suspended above a more recent clock. The northern elevation has a projecting gabled bay with two large pointed arched windows with a rosette above. It is flanked by two single-storeyed gabled bays with rectangular windows.

The refurbishment of the building included most of the windows. Leaded glass windows were replaced with steel mullioned windows with concrete spandrel panels and new rendered masonry surrounds, while pointed arched windows to the side walls were replaced with triangular head windows.

Originally consisting of three double-storeyed height rooms extending in turn to the west, north, and further out to the east, the building has been divided into two storeys. The ground floor has been partitioned for administrative offices, and the first floor now serves as a meeting area.

The fine and impressive timber roof structures of the three major rooms remain visible on the upper floor, being composed of exposed timber blade trusses on quarter-round impost blocks. The ceilings have exposed rafter and purlins over timber boarding. A corner is formed by the continuation of the ceiling along the top of the wall.

Despite substantial internal alterations and the replacement of windows, the building remains a fine addition to the Main Building, retaining major elements of its skilfully-designed interior and exterior.

=== New Building ===
The New Building is a two-storeyed brick building with timber verandahs, rendered concrete lintels and a fibro-cement tiled gambrel roof. It has a rectangular plan, with its long axis running east–west, and is sited immediately to the north of the main building. It has been cut into an escarpment, the result being a reduction of the bulk of the building in relation to the Main Building. It has one storey above ground level to the south, and two storeys above ground level to the north, with unobstructed views over the sports field, Victoria Park and Kelvin Grove. The escarpment has been retained with a brick batter wall.

The building is entered from the south via a timber bridge which runs across the batter wall at first floor level. This entrance is marked with a gable end with vertical timber battens, centred tulip motif, and curved valances. The same gable end is featured to the north.

The four classrooms to each level are accessed via north and south verandahs, and vertically linked with internal terrazzo stairs. To the south, the verandahs have vertically battened timber balustrades, and timber lattice panels to the lower level. To the north, the timber balustrades have been replaced with chainwire and steel pipe, and the lattice replaced with sheeted timber panels. The timber posts to the gabled ends, and to the east and western ends of the verandahs are paired, and decorated with timber panels with tulip motifs.

The verandah ceilings to the upper level are raked, with timber boarding with exposed eaves rafters; the western and eastern ends of the ceilings are finished with triangular panels with vertical battens. The verandahs have ripple iron ceilings to the ground floor.

The classrooms are lined and rendered internally, and have sheeted ceilings. All the classrooms are accessed from both sides via timber double doors. The rooms have two types of grided timber windows; paired sliding sash windows, and high-set grided timber windows with an inward tilting panel.

Despite alterations to the northern elevation, the building remains an intact example of skilful design with modest decoration achieved within the budgetary constraints of the classroom block type.

=== War Memorial Library ===
The War Memorial Library is located immediately to the east of the Main Building, and terminates a vista to the west from Gregory Terrace which is framed by two 1960s buildings. It is a free-standing octagonal Gothic building with stained glass windows, and is made of red brick in English bond with sandstone dressings. It has a steeply pitched slate-tiled octagonal roof covering a single-storeyed space of tall proportions.

The building has stepped buttresses at the corners of the octagon, while the faces of the octagon have paired lancet windows alternating with single lancets which have dormers above. The entrances to the building are on the north and south faces through pointed arch timber double doors with carved inscriptions on either side. The sandstone door surrounds feature a gable carved with trefoil motifs above a hood mould. The sandstone battlement also features trefoil motifs, and is punctuated with curved gables surmounting the buttresses. Other sandstone dressings include hood mouldings and toothed surrounds to windows, thin pilasters crowned with small spires which link the dormers to the windows below, and two courses of rough hewn stone at the base.

The interior has an elaborate exposed roof structure consisting of small arched trusses springing from sandstone impost blocks, which are centred on brick piers at the corners of the octagons. The trusses meet at a midpoint below the roof pinnacle; the remainder of the roof is supported with struts springing from a central half-post. It has a timber boarded ceiling with exposed rafters, and the dormers are expressed in the ceiling.

The room has twelve high-set stained glass windows with sandstone voussoirs encircling the room, as well as four stained glass windows to the dormers. Of the twelve windows, ten feature figures personifying chivalrous virtues; the window over the north door features the figure of peace, while south windows features that of victory. The building contains a number of commemorative plaques, and dark timber furniture with Gothic detailing. The latter consists of the "Crystal Cabinet", the "Octagonal Cabinet", a tall glass-fronted cabinet, a smaller glass-fronted cabinet, and a bench.

The Memorial Library has been described as notable for its concept, composition, detailing and symbolic content within the school building group.[1]

=== Old Correspondence School ===
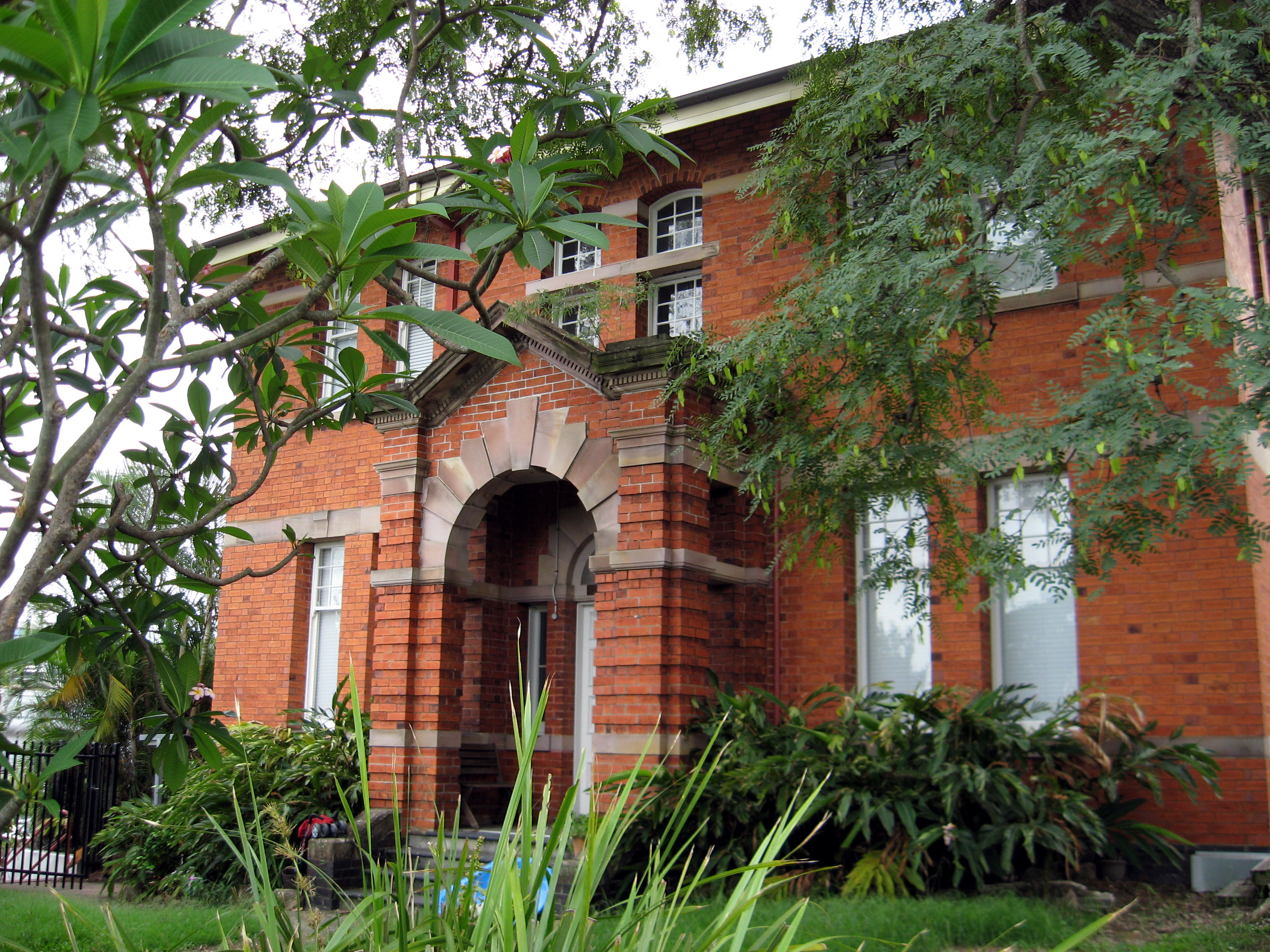
S.W. Griffith Building (former Primary Correspondence School), 2015

The Old Correspondence School is located to the west of the School House, on a lower terraced level which falls gently to the west. It is a double-storeyed banded red-brick building with a red corrugated iron hipped roof, fronting onto and rising above College Road. The building consists of two wings; an 1899 wing which runs north–south, with its address to College Road, and an adjoining 1923 wing running east–west, which has a semi-basement to the west.

The southern elevation has a fine brick and sandstone entrance portico. The northern elevation has a projecting bay with its own pyramid roof, containing toilets, which is linked to the building with an enclosed timber verandah clad in weatherboard. The western elevation has a single-storeyed weatherboard-clad enclosed verandah, while the eastern elevation has a double-storeyed enclosed verandah. The eastern elevation has been extended with a single storeyed weatherboard annex.

The brickwork is banded with sandstone courses to the 1899 section, and beige brick courses to the later addition. These courses run above and below the windows, and a deep band of blue-grey brick runs around the base of the entire building. The windows to the upper level have flat arches with splayed brick voussoirs (excepting to the toilet bay). The ground floor windows have square heads with sandstone lintels and keystones to the 1899 section, and splayed brick lintels to the newer section. All openings to the west are protected with corrugated iron sunshades on timber brackets.

The entry portico to the south has rusticated brick pilasters flanking a sandstone arch with toothed voussoirs, set in a brick gable end surmounted by a sandstone cornice with dentils. The timber double entrance doors are surmounted by a similar sandstone arch around a glazed fanlight.

The interior features two timber staircases, which have timber balustrades with turned newels with rounded terminals. The windows are sliding sash with grided panes to the upper leaves, excluding those to the verandahs and toilet bay. The verandahs are accessed with timber double doors with fanlights.

The 1899 section has ripple iron ceilings, while the 1925 section has sheeted ceilings with coverstrips. The southern rooms have views to the city, Petrie Terrace and Paddington.

The 1898 building exhibits some fine detailing, and the later addition is successfully complementary in form, character and materials.

== Heritage listing ==
Brisbane Grammar School was listed on the Queensland Heritage Register on 21 August 1992 having satisfied the following criteria.

The place is important in demonstrating the evolution or pattern of Queensland's history.

The Brisbane Grammar School Buildings are important in demonstrating the pattern of Queensland's history, in particular the history of education and the development of the Grammar Schools evidence of the development of a self-conscious pedagogical culture within the Brisbane Grammar School.

The Main Building of the Brisbane Grammar School is important in demonstrating the pattern of Queensland's development, in particular, the development of the grammar schools and provides evidence of the development of a self-conscious pedagogical culture within the Brisbane Grammar School.

The School House of the Brisbane Grammar School is important in demonstrating the evolution and pattern of Queensland's history, in particular, the building registers the changing attitudes in boarding practices.

The Brisbane Grammar School Administration Building is important in demonstrating the evolution and pattern of Queensland's history, in particular the evolution of the study of science in the school curriculum.

The New Building of the Brisbane Grammar School is important in demonstrating the evolution and pattern of Queensland's history, in particular changes in educational policy in the state and the role of Grammar Schools in the secondary school system.

The War Memorial Library is important in demonstrating the evolution and pattern of Queensland's history, in particular the participation by former students and staff, in World War I, and in common with many other communities, the need to memorialise that participation and loss.

The Old Correspondence School is important in demonstrating the evolution and pattern of Queensland's history in particular the importance of primary industries and the role played by government via the Stock Institute in its development, the development of the role of the Health Department in public health with the establishment of the Bacteriological Institute and the Laboratory of Pathology and Microbiology and the development of distance education.

The place demonstrates rare, uncommon or endangered aspects of Queensland's cultural heritage.

The Main Building, School House, Administration Building, New Building, and War Memorial Library are a rare example of a group of buildings where a clear aesthetic coherence has been sustained.

The Main Building of the Brisbane Grammar School is important in demonstrating rare aspects of Queensland's cultural heritage, containing early examples of Australian designed stained glass.

The War Memorial Library demonstrates rare aspects of Queensland's cultural heritage, in particular its substantial and rich symbolic content make it an unusual and distinctive part of a school building group.

The place is important in demonstrating the principal characteristics of a particular class of cultural places.

The Main Building of the Brisbane Grammar School is important in demonstrating the principal characteristics of a Collegiate Gothic educational building.

The School House of the Brisbane Grammar School is important in demonstrating the principal characteristics of a school boarding house.

The Old Correspondence School is important in demonstrating the principal characteristics of a building of the Public Works Department, who at this time set high standards for public architecture.

The place is important because of its aesthetic significance.

The Brisbane Grammar School is important in exhibiting a range of aesthetic characteristics valued by the community, in particular its quality as a group of buildings, comprising the Main Building, School House, Administration Building, New Building, and War Memorial Library, which complement each other in character, materials, and siting. The Brisbane Grammar School is significant for the fineness and symbolic content of some of its crafted elements and its contribution to the townscape as a landmark.

The Main Building of the Brisbane Grammar School is important in exhibiting a range of aesthetic characteristics valued by the community, in particular, the impressive exterior which reinforces the buildings as the focus of the Grammar School Group, the exceptional quality of the upper-level classroom interiors, the Great Hall and the Oamaru Stone porch and the well crafted quality and symbolic content of the memorials and stained glass windows in the Great Hall.

The School House of the Brisbane Grammar School is important in exhibiting a range of aesthetic characteristics valued by the community, in particular, the accomplished design of the exterior in its delineation of the building's domestic and institutional roles, in its brickwork detailing, and the impressive quality of the interior of the upper level.

The Brisbane Grammar School Administration Building is important in exhibiting aesthetic characteristics valued by the community, in particular, its contribution to the Grammar School group in its skilful reworking by GD Payne of the architectural vocabulary of the Main Building. The Brisbane Grammar School Administration Building is significant as it contains the remnants of fine interiors, particularly the timber roof structures.

The New Building of the Brisbane Grammar School is important in exhibiting aesthetic characteristics valued by the community in particular, its accomplished design within the constraints of the classroom block type, its complementary siting in relation to the Main Building and its modest decorative detailing.

The War Memorial Library is important in exhibiting a range of aesthetic qualities valued by the community, in particular its architectural distinction in concept, composition and detailing, the high quality and symbolic content of the stained-glass windows, the high quality of the purpose-built furniture and its contribution to the school's distinctive skyline.

The Old Correspondence School is important in exhibiting a range of aesthetic qualities valued by the community, in particular, the fine detailing of the 1899 building, the entrance portico, the skilful design of the extension to the 1899 building in terms of its complementary form, character, materials and detailing and its landmark qualities.

The place has a strong or special association with a particular community or cultural group for social, cultural or spiritual reasons.

The Brisbane Grammar School is significant for its special association with the Brisbane community and the community of the Brisbane Grammar School for social and cultural reasons.

The Main Building of the Brisbane Grammar School is significant for its special association with the Brisbane Grammar School community, in particular the Great Hall is both a symbol of and memorial to the school and its members.

The School House of the Brisbane Grammar School has a strong and special association with Brisbane Grammar School community, particularly the boarders since 1887.

The War Memorial Library has a strong and special association with the Brisbane Grammar School, in particular as a memorial to the old boys who served in the Great War and also to the many subscribers and others who contributed to its erection as a symbol forming part of the nomenclature of school.

The place has a special association with the life or work of a particular person, group or organisation of importance in Queensland's history.

The buildings and grounds of the Brisbane Grammar School have a special association with the life and work of the Trustees, Headmasters, teachers, students, Official Visitors and many others associated with the school, many of whom have been prominent in Queensland's history. The Brisbane Grammar School also has a special association with the work of a number of architects in particular, James Cowlishaw, Richard Gailey, GD Payne, Public Works Department, John Barr, RS Dods, and TR Hall, a number of whom were old boys of the school.

The Main Building of the Brisbane Grammar School is significant for its special association with the work of architect James Cowlishaw and with the Public Works Department.

The School House of the Brisbane Grammar School has a special association with the work of architect Richard Gailey.

The Brisbane Grammar School Administration Building has a special association with the work of architect GD Payne, who was also the architect for the New Building (Brisbane Grammar Schoold) and with School Janitor George Rylatt, whose association with the school is memorialised in the building.

The New Building of the Brisbane Grammar School has a special association with the work of GD Payne, who was also the architect for the Administration Building (Brisbane Grammar Schoolc) and with the work of the Works Department, which at this time enjoyed eminence under Government Architect AB Brady, and which was responsible for numerous school buildings.

The War Memorial Library has a special association with the work of an old boy, architect John Barr and with the work of artist, Charles Tute.

The Old Correspondence School has a special association with the work of a number of government departments including the Department of Primary Industries in particular the Stock Institute, which was the first established in Australia, with the Department of Health, in particular as the Bacteriological Institute and the Laboratory of Pathology and Microbiology, with the Department of Education and the work of the Primary Correspondence School for over 40 years and with the Works Department.
