= Gregory Terrace =

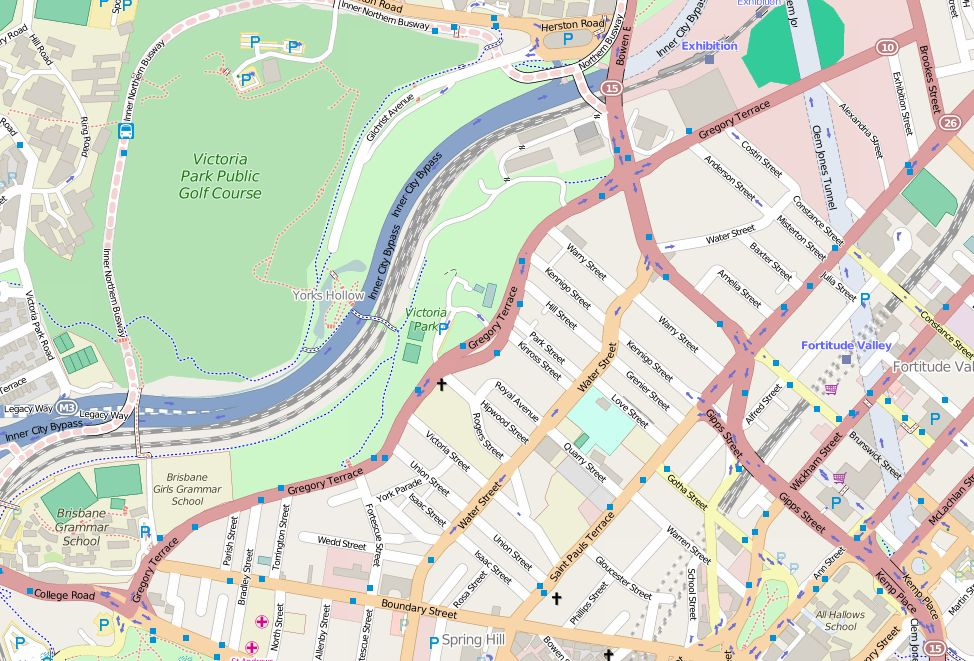
OpenStreetMap – Gregory Terrace, 2015

Gregory Terrace is a road in Brisbane, Queensland, Australia.

== Geography ==
Gregory Terrace commences at an intersection with Wickham Terrace and College Road in Spring Hill (27.4608°S 153.0183°E). It travels in a north-easterly direction through Spring Hill, Fortitude Valley and Herston, where it terminates at a junction with Brookes Street (27.4498°S 153.0353°E).

== Landmarks ==
There are many landmarks along Gregory Terrace, including (from Spring Hill to Herston, sorted by street number/position):

- Roma Street Parkland
- 17: Cliveden Mansions
- 24: Brisbane Grammar School and its buildings
- Brisbane Girls Grammar School
- 285: St Joseph's College, Gregory Terrace
- 369: Victoria Flats
- 400: Centenary Pool Complex
- 449 & 451: Grangehill
- 454: Victoria Park
- 480: Old Museum Building
- 574: Brisbane Exhibition Ground
