= Thomas Blair Moncrieff Wightman =

Thomas Blair Moncrieff Wightman (1884–1972) was an architect in Queensland, Australia. A number of his works are now heritage-listed.

== Early life ==
Thomas Blair Moncrieff Wightman was born in Glasgow, Scotland in 1884, the son of Robert Anderson Wightman and his wife Jeanie Greenless (née Dunsmore).

He trained in Scotland as an architect and arrived in Brisbane c. 1910 at the age of 26.

He married Hannah Matkin in 1910 in the All Saints Anglican Church in Spring Hill, Brisbane. The couple had one daughter, Jean, born 1911.

== Career as an architect ==
On arrival in Brisbane, he first lectured in architecture at the Brisbane Central Technical College, then was employed by architects Atkinson and McLay in 1912, and was in private practice in Brisbane by 1913 – firstly on his own, then as Wightman and Phillips from 1914 to 1918. From 1919 he practised alone until his retirement c. 1933. He was a councillor of the Queensland Institute of Architects and its president in 1923–24. He was elected a Fellow of the Royal Institute of British Architects in 1927.

Wightman's work was well received in Brisbane, and his residential work is considered to be important in the development of interwar domestic architecture in Queensland. He established a substantial residential practice, and attracted prestigious commissions which permitted design experimentation in adapting the traditional Queensland timber house to meet changing social and functional requirements.

== Works ==
Victoria Flats in Spring Hill (known as Kilroe's Flats at the time of their construction c. 1922) are the only purpose-built flats in Brisbane identified as designed by Wightman. In these flats, Wightman employed elements of domestic bungalow style in the tradition of the Queensland high-set house. The verandah spaces in particular are illustrative of changing lifestyles in Brisbane during the interwar period, when verandah widths and designs were being experimented with to permit their use as outdoor living and sleeping "rooms". The flats are listed on the Queensland Heritage Register.

Wightman also designed the former Masonic Temple at 149 Brunswick Street, Fortitude Valley c. 1922, which is now listed on the Brisbane Heritage Register.

== Later life ==
In April 1932, Thomas Wightman was convicted of income tax evasion for the financial year 1925–1926, having understated his income and deducted a number of fictitious expenses. He was fined £100 and ordered to pay double income tax as penalty, with the alternative of six months in prison.

His wife died unexpectedly on 7 August 1932 in a private hospital in Toowong.

He travelled worldwide during 1933—1935, including Japan (where he was concerned about the political situation), South Africa (where he was concerned about the plague of grasshoppers). He also noted a growing preference for buses over trams as a means of public transport in both the United Kingdom and South Africa.

He retired to Sydney c. 1940.

He died in Sydney on 22 February 1972.
