= Raymond Park, Brisbane =

Park in Kangaroo Point, Brisbane, Australia

Raymond Park
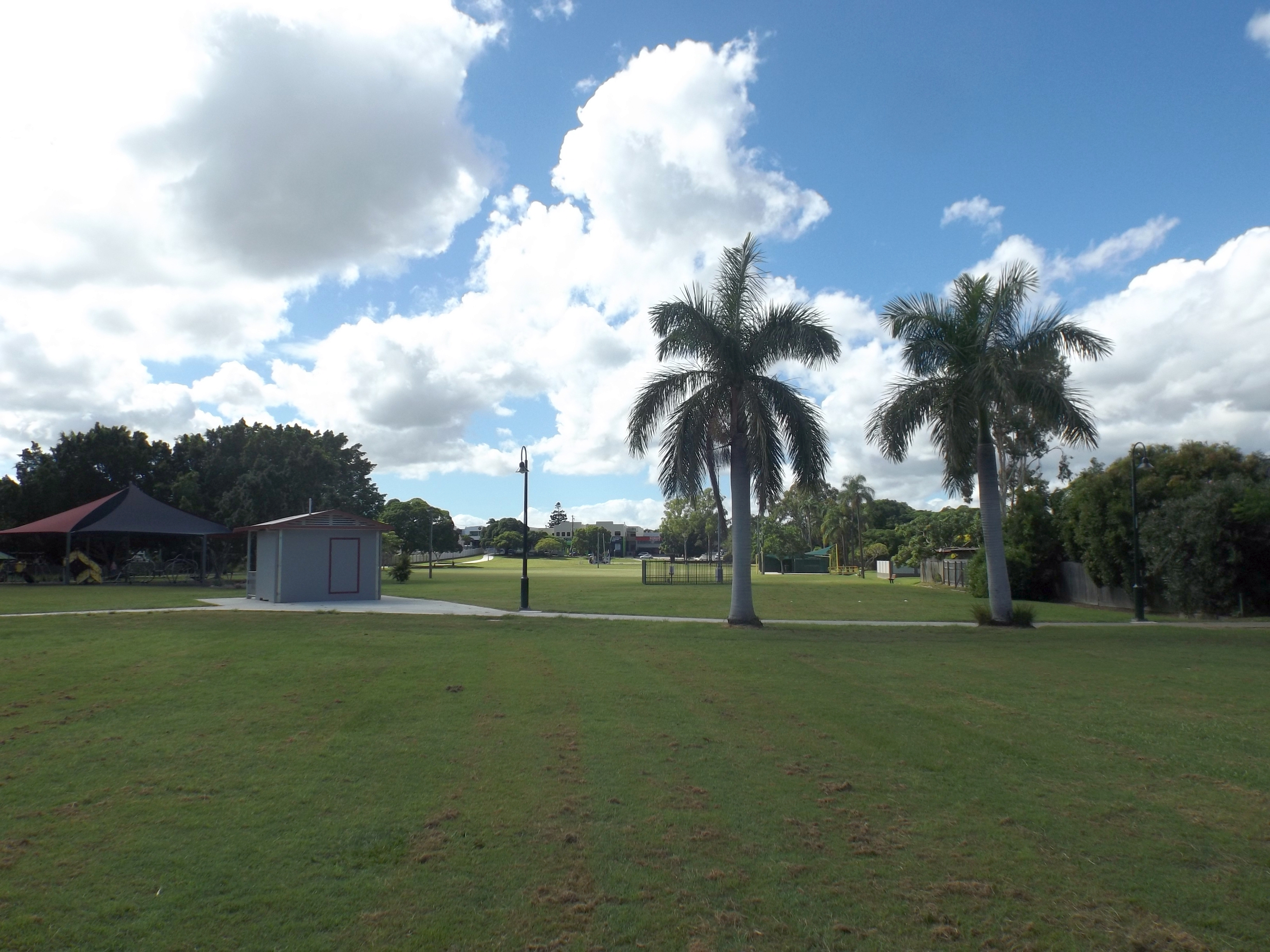
- Central area, 2015

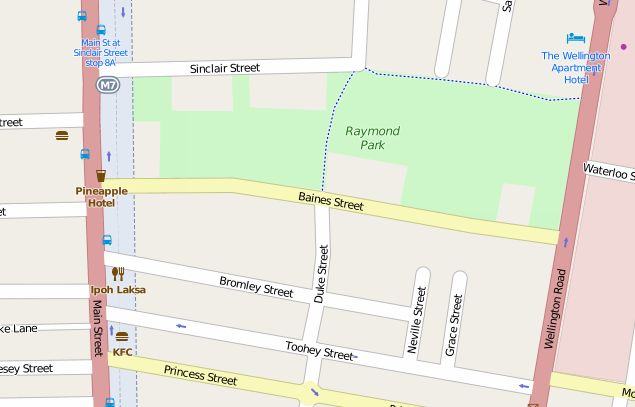
- Type: Public park
- Location: Kangaroo Point
- Nearest city: Brisbane
- Coordinates: 27.4805°S 153.039013°E
- Created: 1913

Raymond Park is a park in Kangaroo Point, Brisbane, Queensland, Australia. It is also known informally as Pineapple Park due to the presence of the Pineapple Hotel on the corner of the park.

== Geography ==
Raymond Park is roughly rectangular in shape and bounded by Main Street to the west, Wellington Street to the east, and Baines Street to the south, and Sinclair Street in part to the north. The irregularity in shape is due to the presence of the Pineapple Hotel in the south-west corner and housing at other locations, presumably existing prior to the establishment of the park. Note Baines Street is named after Edward Joseph Baines, a mayor of Brisbane who was the publican of the Pineapple Hotel.

== History ==
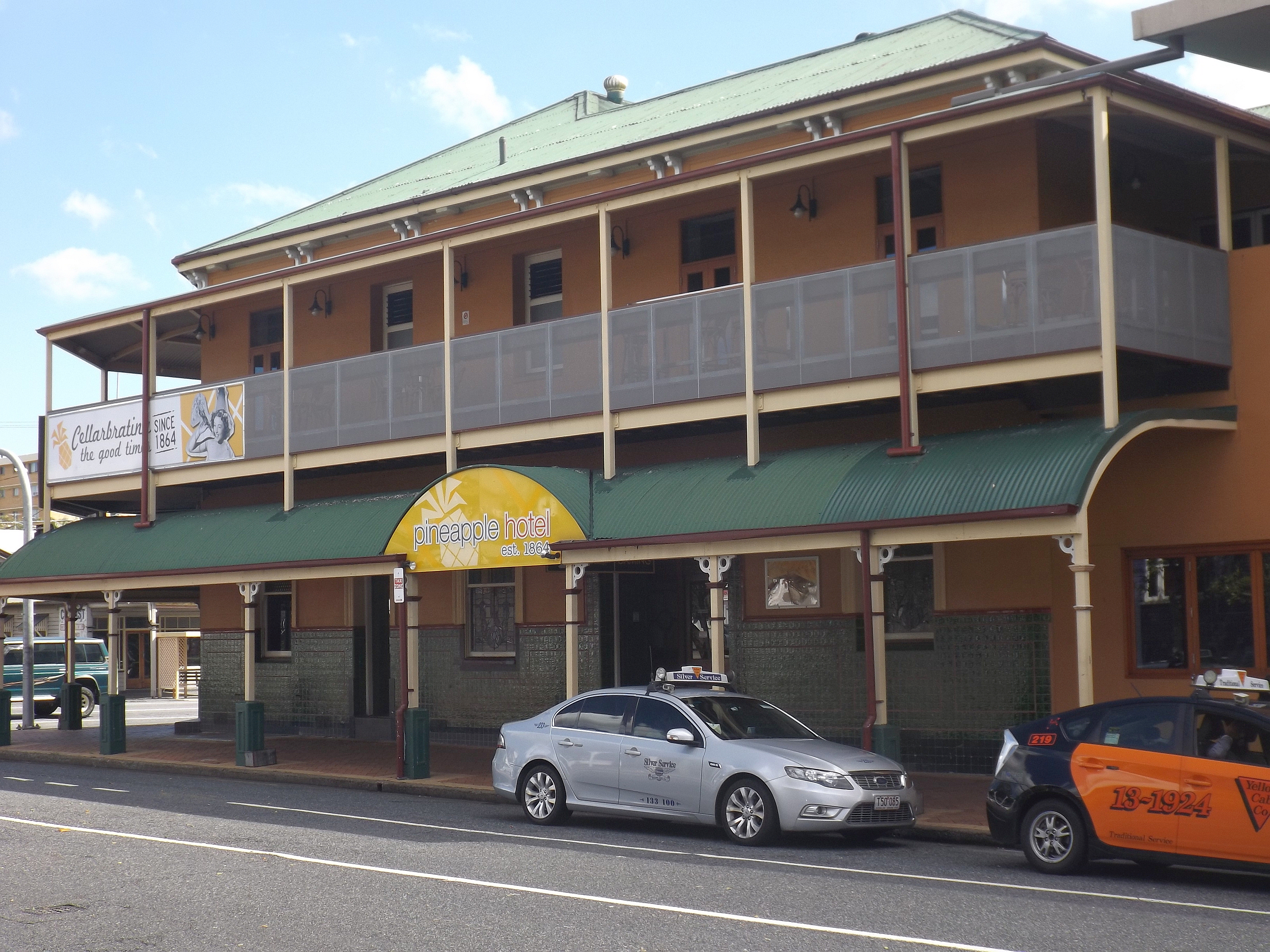
Pineapple Hotel Kangaroo Point, 2015

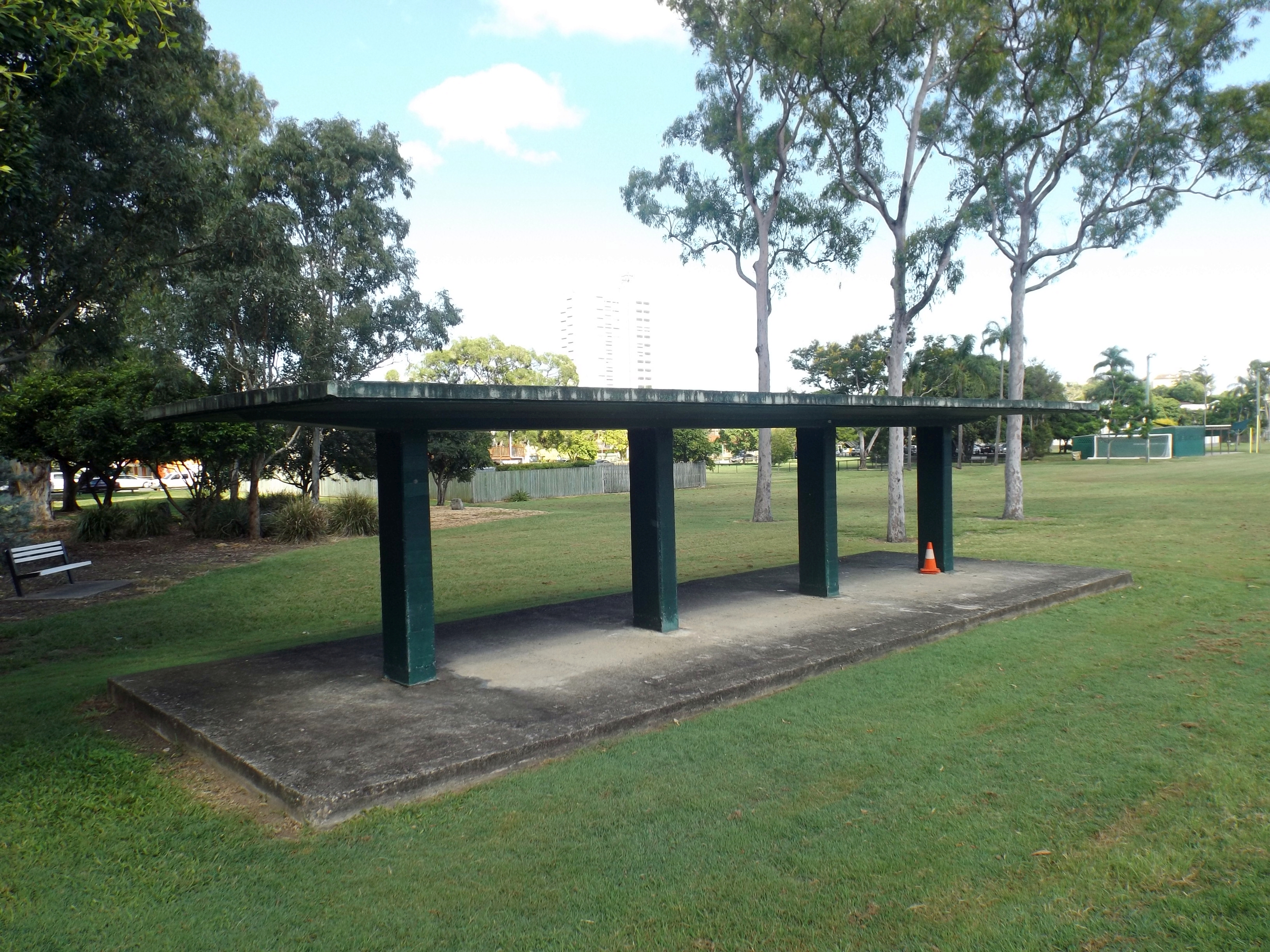
Raymond Park (East) Air Raid Shelter, 2015

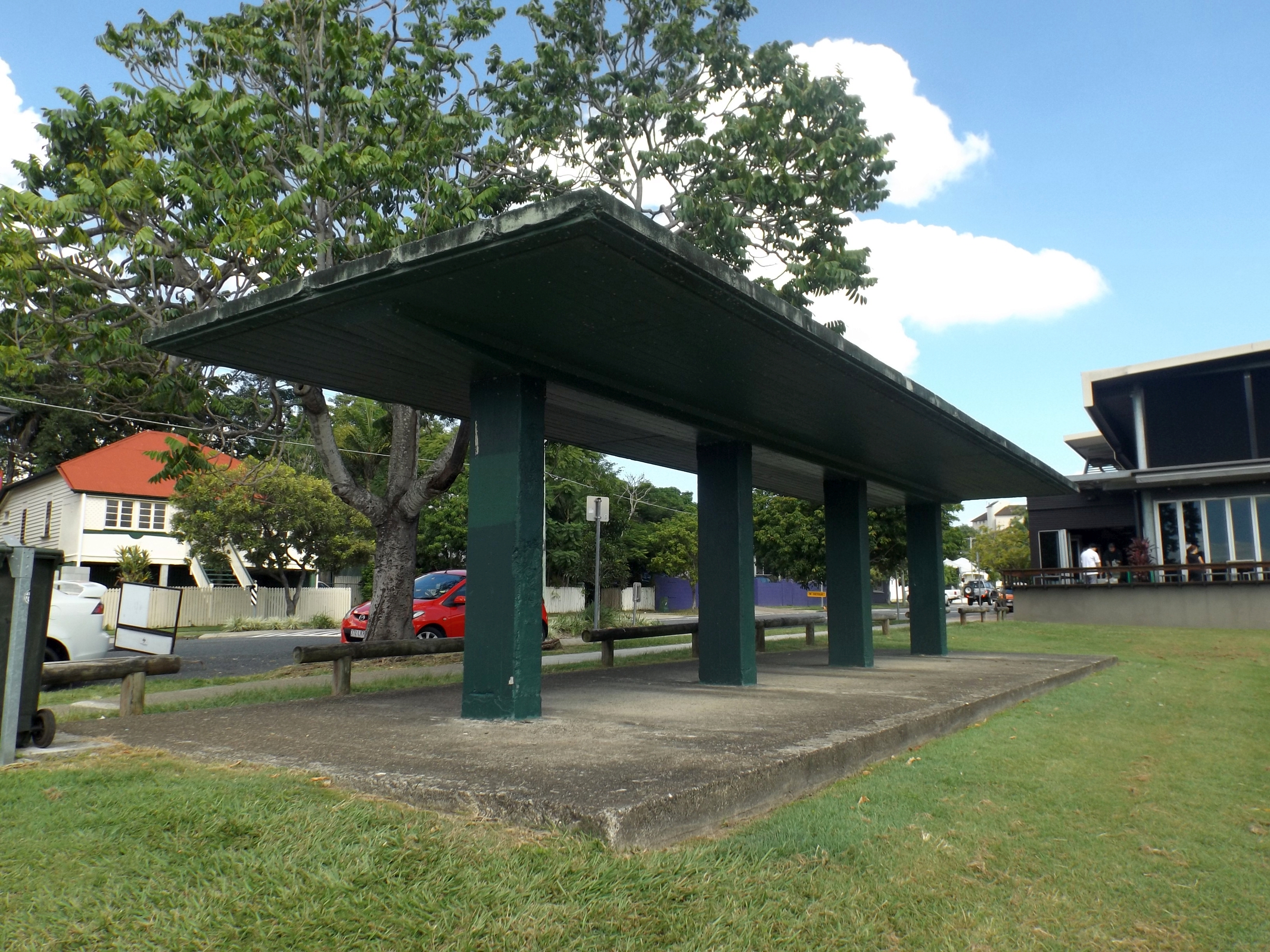
Raymond Park (West) Air Raid Shelter, 2015

In 1864, the Pineapple Hotel was established on the south-western corner of Main Street and Baines Street in Kangaroo Point.

In the early 1880s, the first soccer teams were established in Brisbane, initially practising at Queen's Park in Alice Street (now part of the City Botanic Gardens) in the Brisbane CBD. However, as that park was used by other sports teams, the soccer teams decided to seek a new practice ground. A vacant block of land at South Brisbane bounded by Melbourne Street, Stanley Street and Grey Street was trialled but was found to be frequently waterlogged after rain, so the soccer teams relocated to grounds behind the Pineapple Hotel (the ground is now the western part of Raymond Park). The first competitive soccer matches in Brisbane were played at the Pineapple Sportsground in 1884. The ground was also the home of Pineapple Rovers [soccer] Football Club, one of the most prominent clubs in Brisbane, from the late 1880s until around 1940.

In 1886–1887, the Pineapple Hotel was re-built in its current form.

In July 1913, over six acres of land on Wellington Road was purchased at a cost of £4,600 by the Brisbane City Council to establish a park called Raymond Park after Alfred John Raymond, who had been mayor of Brisbane in 1912 and the alderman for Kangaroo Point for many years and was the chairman of the Parks Committee in 1913. Following work undertaken by the Brisbane City Council to create the park, Raymond Park was officially designated a public place in April 1915.

During World War II, concerns about air raids by Japan resulted in the construction of many air raid shelters in Brisbane. Two air raid shelters were constructed at the eastern and western ends of Raymond Park. Although most air raid shelters were demolished after the war, the eastern and western air raid shelters in Raymond Park are among the handful to survive, albeit with their outer walls removed. They are listed on the Queensland Heritage Register.

== See also ==
- List of parks in Brisbane
