= Wickham Park, Brisbane =

Park in Brisbane, Australia

Coordinates: 27.4657°S 153.0219°E

Wickham Park
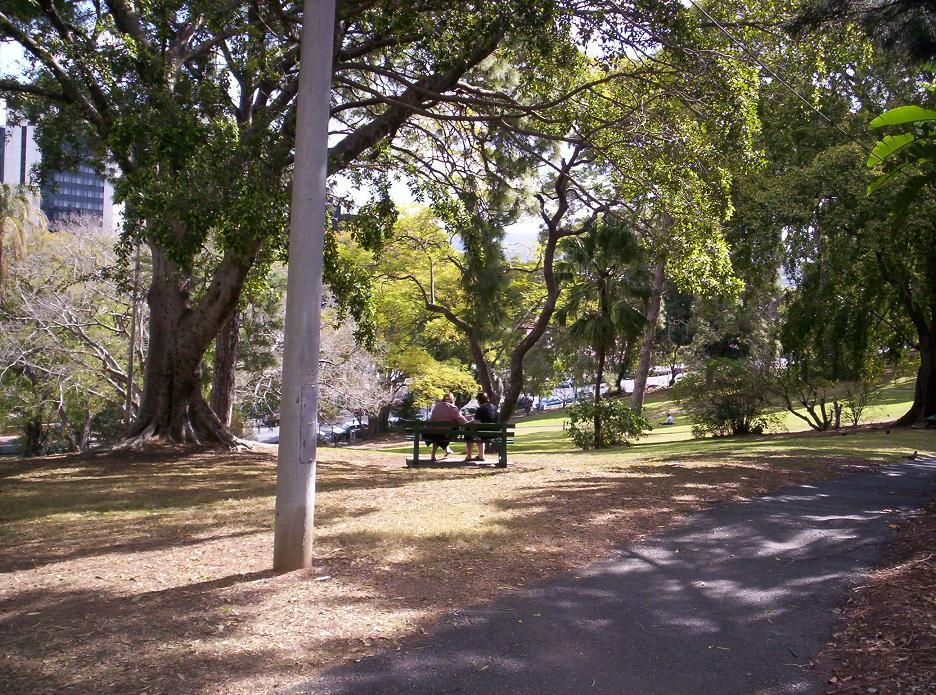
- Wickham Park
- Interactive map of Wickham Park
- Location: Brisbane, Queensland, Australia
- Area: 19,100 m^{2}
- Operator: Brisbane City Council

Wickham Park is a park at 330 Wickham Terrace, Spring Hill, Brisbane, Queensland, Australia.

== Geography ==
Wickham Park lies on the fall of the land from Wickham Terrace to down to Albert Street. To the north-west, it is adjacent to the Roma Street Parkland (formerly Albert Park) which lies on the fall of the land from the higher parts of Wickham Terrace down to the Roma Street railway station.

== History ==
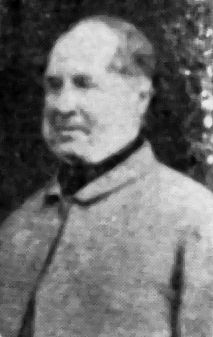
John Clements Wickham

Wickham Park was named after John Clements Wickham. It was formerly known as the Wickham Terrace Reserve and Wickham Terrace Park.

== Heritage listings ==
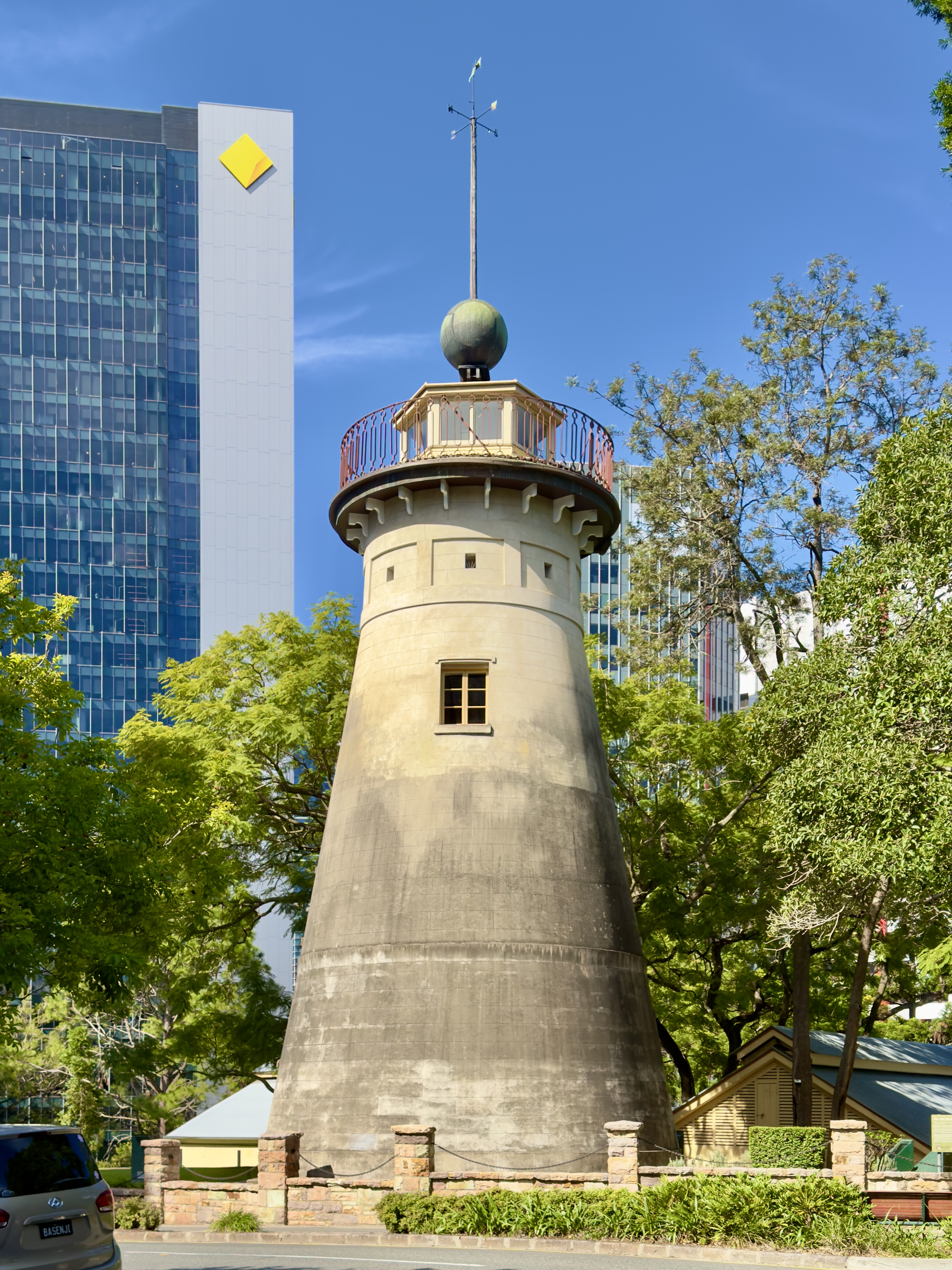
The Old Windmill, in Wickham Park

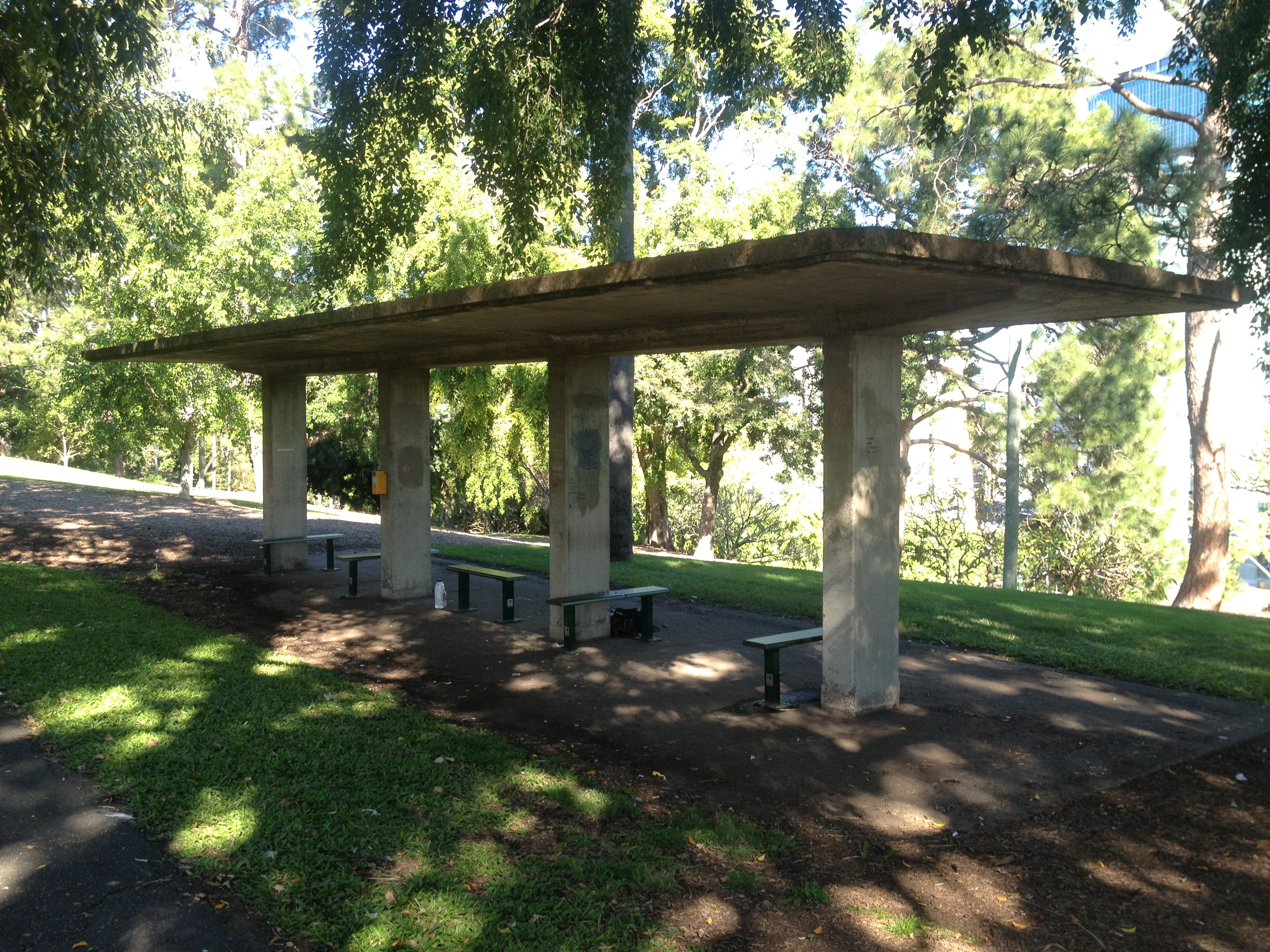
Remains of World War II air-raid shelters in Wickham Park

Wickham Park contains a number of heritage-listed sites, including:

- 226 Wickham Terrace: The Old Windmill, the oldest surviving building in Brisbane
- 230 Wickham Terrace: Spring Hill Reservoirs
- 330 Wickham Terrace: Wickham Park Air Raid Shelters
