= Fortitude Valley Police Station =

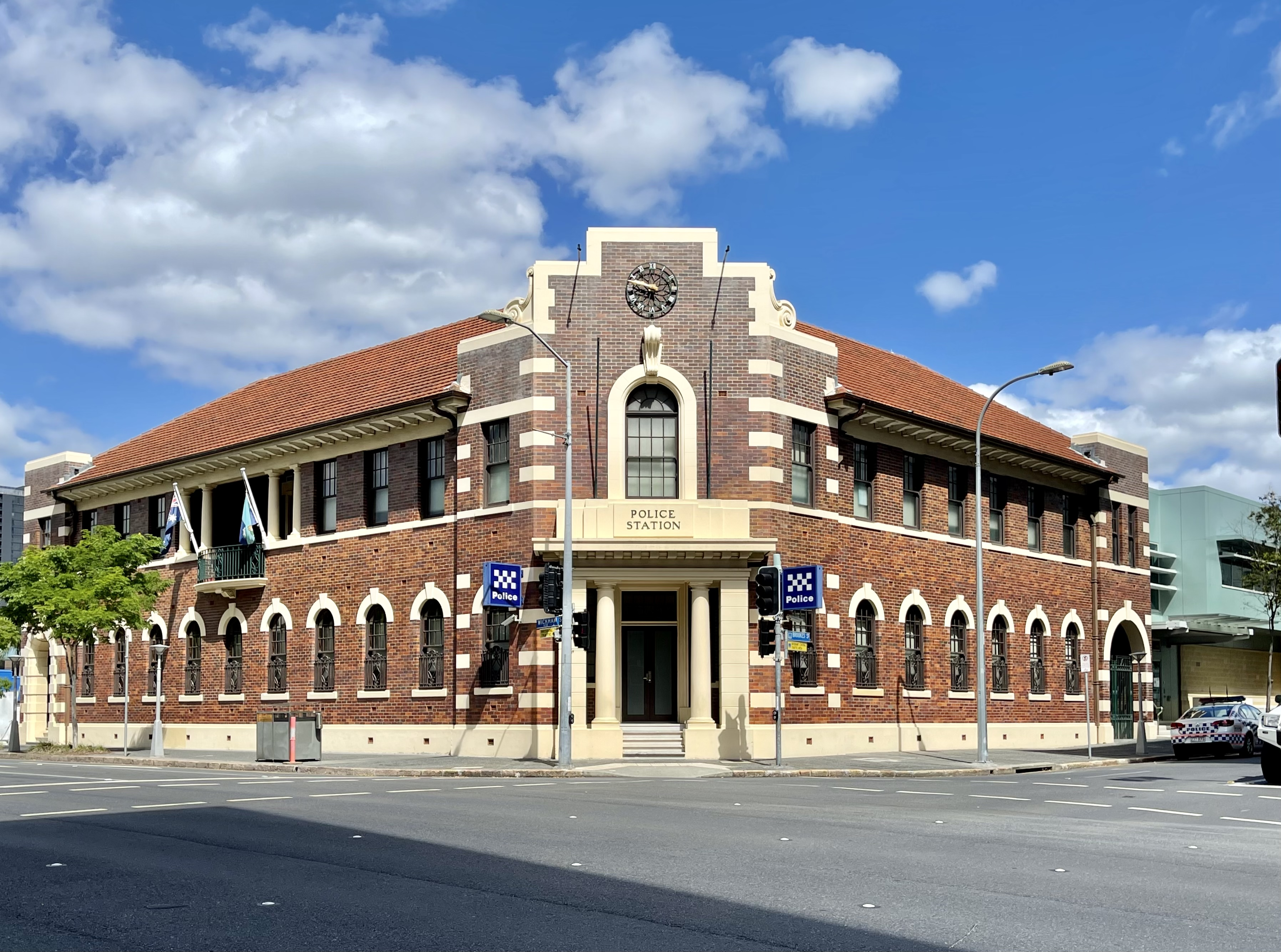
- Fortitude Valley Police Station, 2021

- Location within Queensland Location within Australia
- 27.4533°S 153.0373°E
- Location: 119 Brookes Street, Fortitude Valley, City of Brisbane, Queensland, Australia

History
- Design period: 1919–1930s (interwar period)
- Built: 1935–1936

Site notes
- Architect: Raymond Clare Nowland
- Architectural style: Classicism

Queensland Heritage Register
- Official name: Fortitude Valley Police Station
- Type: state heritage (built)
- Designated: 24 June 1999
- Reference no.: 601168
- Significant period: 1930s (historical); 1930s (fabric)
- Significant components: police station, barracks – police

Fortitude Valley Police Station is a heritage-listed police station at 119 Brookes Street, Fortitude Valley, City of Brisbane, Queensland, Australia. It was designed by Raymond Clare Nowland and built from 1935 to 1936. It was added to the Queensland Heritage Register on 24 June 1999.

== History ==
Opened on 6 July 1936, the Fortitude Valley Police Station is a striking, two-storeyed red facebrick building with contrasting imitation stone dressings to arched entrances and window surrounds on the corner of Brookes and Wickham Streets, Fortitude Valley.

From the 1850s there was a spread of urban settlement into Fortitude Valley and the area quickly became a thriving village. By the end of the 19th century Fortitude Valley had emerged as an important commercial and retail area with a number of substantial buildings and was a popular residential area. The area continued to expand during the early decades of the 20th century.

The Fortitude Valley Police Station replaced an earlier station in Church Street when the area was elevated to the status of a police district in 1934 and the existing police station in Church Street was declared "quite inadequate for such an important quarter of the city." At the official opening the new station was described as the "finest, most up-to-date, and most comfortable police station in Queensland." The Station provided an entrance lobby and offices on the ground floor for the Inspector of Police and Clerks, Sergeant of Police and Clerk, Records, Station Sergeant's office, Constables and Non-Commissioned Officers' day rooms, plain and uniform Enquiry staff rooms with interrogating rooms, Paymaster and Enquiry rooms; dormitory accommodation, recreation rooms and sitting rooms, married and single men's messes, kitchen and lavatory and bathing facilities on the first floor; a lavatory block connected to the rear of the main building by a battened gangway; and garage to the rear corner of the courtyard. The dormitory was designed to provide commodious accommodation for single constables and were cross ventilated with tilting fanlights to each room. The building has been in continuous use as a police station since its construction.

With changes to police work practices the building has been altered on a number of occasions since 1962. The first floor dormitory accommodation has been adapted for use as office accommodation for the CIB, Records, interviewing rooms and intelligence data recording.

Glazed panels and door have been inserted within the elliptical arch between the main entrance lobby and the main hall; toilet and shower facilities have been refurbished; dropped ceilings have been inserted in some areas; plant for air conditioning and computers inserted; and an office mezzanine inserted within the former Sergeant's Clerks Office. The exterior of the building is substantially intact and much original interior fabric survives including window and door joinery; fibrous cement ceilings with timber cover strips; decorative plaster ceilings; plaster and timber skirtings and architraves; timber picture rails; decorative elliptical arch between the lobby and hall; terrazzo floors to the main entrance lobby and main hall; the main and subsidiary staircases with terrazzo treads and landings, silky oak handrails and newels, decorative wrought iron balustrading and decorative consoles to the flat arched approaches to the stairwells. Formerly stained and varnished, the timber panelling to the walls throughout the public areas, cover strips to the fibrous cement ceilings, timber architraves, cornices and picture rails are now painted. The integrity and spatial relations of the internal planning remain.

The main entrance stair was an important component of the building and the French polishing section of the building specification referring to the stair handrails, newels and panelling states that "great care to be taken to show off the timber and panels to best advantage".

The Fortitude Valley Police Station is a landmark structure within a precinct of community service buildings including the Fortitude Valley Swimming Baths, former Fortitude Valley State School, present Fortitude Valley State School, Holy Trinity Church and rectory.

Designed by Raymond Clare Nowland, an architect in the Department of Public Works (DPW), the Fortitude Valley Police Station was constructed during an intensive public works building program undertaken by the Forgan Smith Labor Government in Queensland during the 1930s to counter the effects of the Great Depression.

Raymond Clare Nowland joined the architectural office of the DPW in November 1932 where he became a senior architect in 1938. He produced the most significant buildings of his career between 1932 and 1942 including the University of Queensland Mayne Medical School at Herston (1939); Brisbane Dental Hospital and College (1941); Police Barracks, Petrie Terrace (1942); the Cairns Court House Complex (1935), the Rockhampton Courthouse, Toowoomba Police Station Complex and Maryborough Government Offices Building. Nowland undertook architectural studies at the Sydney Technical College (1911–14) and the Architectural Association School London (1919). In private practice from 1926–32, he undertook a range of domestic and commercial commissions including the Brisbane Clinic, Wickham Terrace, Brisbane (1930) (Lister House). His preference for designing within a restrained classicism reflects his architectural training, the prevailing professional architectural attitudes and the design direction given by the Chief Architect, A.B. Leven. Along with many British Empire architects of the 1930s, Leven and Nowland shared a respect for simplicity, order and rational planning which in his public work enabled Nowland to make a notable contribution to the architectural fabric of Queensland towns and cities.

== Description ==
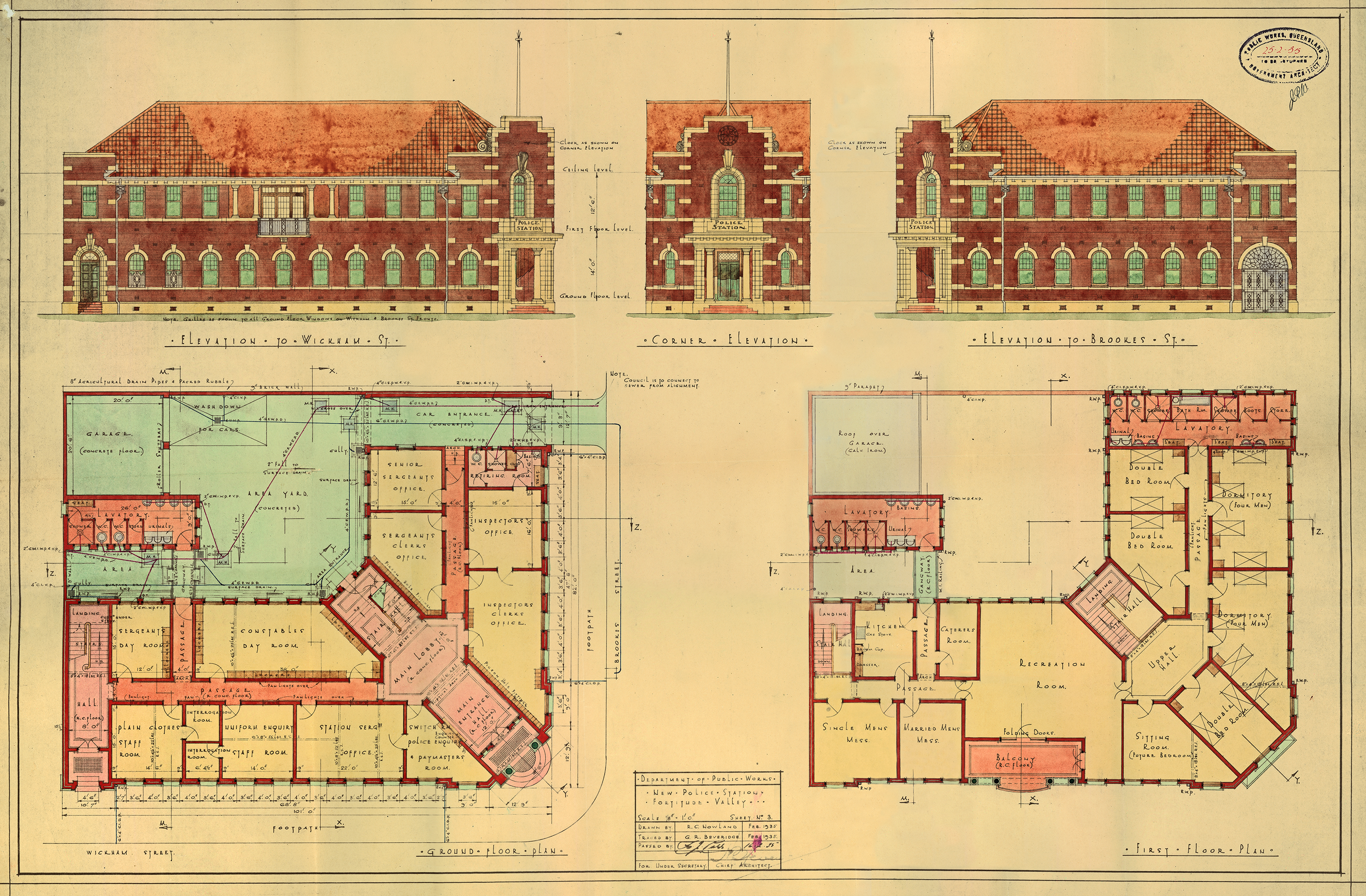
Architectural plans, circa 1935

The Fortitude Valley Police Station, a two-storey, L-shaped building in red facebrick with contrasting imitation stone facings in cream cement render, is a striking presence to the corner of Brookes and Wickham Streets, Fortitude Valley. The prominent tiled hipped roof is interrupted at the street corner and building ends by high narrow parapets with relieved quoining. Built around a courtyard containing a lavatory block and garaging to the rear, the Station is distinguished by a rendered portico entrance below an electric clock and rendered arched timber sash window within the high narrow parapet to the corner and striking rendered arches with prominent scroll keystones to the ground floor timber sash windows to both elevations.

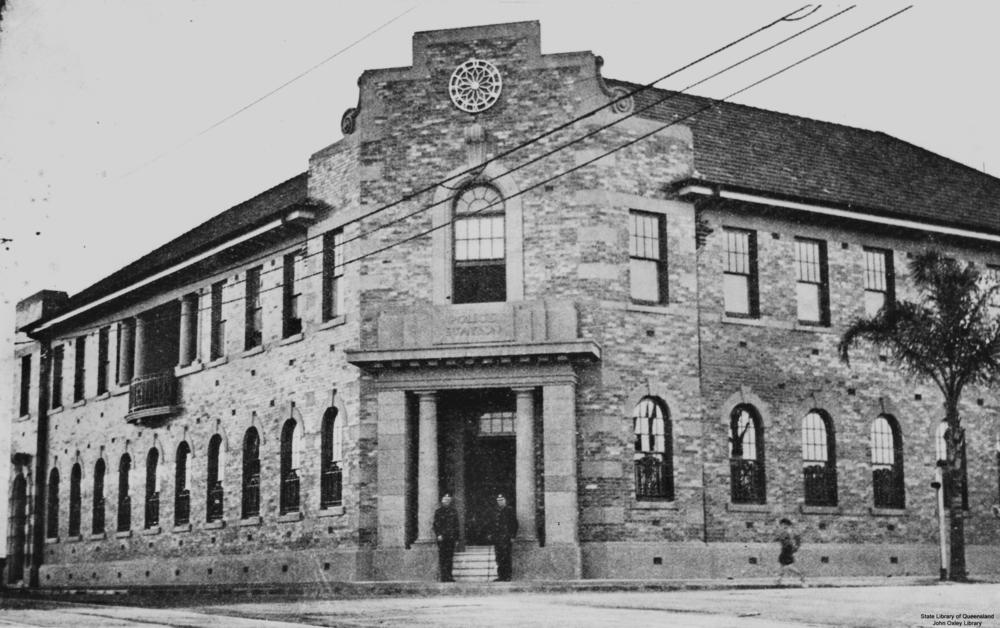
Police station, 1936

Single-height Doric columns flanked by rusticated pilasters beneath a dentilled cornice frame the main corner entrance portico which contains a set of terrazzo stairs and landing. The rusticated rendered arch with a prominent scroll keystone marks the side entrance portico to Wickham Street and is framed by rendered quoining to a high narrow parapet. Wrought iron ornamental grilles are provided to the ground floor street windows and ornamental iron gates to the arched vehicle entrance to Brookes Street. Overlooking Wickham Street from the first floor, an open porch framed by four half-height rendered Doric columns has an elegant, projecting oval balcony with decorative wrought iron balustrading. Bold brackets to lined roof eaves project over the plain flat arched sash windows to the first floor.

The narrow high triangular parapeted rear entrance is accessed from the courtyard from a door sheltered by a moulded concrete awning supported by consoles which sits beneath the large semi-circular window which lights the main stairwell.

The main corner entrance portico opens to a spacious main entrance lobby and hall around which the building hinges and from which central corridors run through each wing. Within the hinge, a dog leg timber stair connects to the first floor and a rear entrance opens to the courtyard beyond. The corridor to the Brookes Street wing opens to the vehicle laneway and the corridor to the Wickham Street wing terminates at a secondary dog leg timber stair. A side passage off this corridor connects via a battened gangway to the lavatory block in the rear courtyard.

The main entrance lobby, hall floors, Wickham Street side entrance lobby, stair treads and landings in both stairwells are in pale gold and white terrazzo with black terrazzo borders to the floors. Two large plaster rosette pateras lie to the upper corners of the main lobby to each side of the elliptical moulded arch with large scroll keystone which separates the lobby from the hall. This opening has now been glazed and contains a glazed security door. The main stair doglegs off the hall and has a grooved silky oak handrail and 6"x6" stop chamfered silky oak newels with sunk necking and domed caps. Ornamental consoles decorate the flat arched openings to the stairwell. The plaster ceilings to the lobby and hall are decorated with a border figure of tied bundles of straight twigs. The Wickham Street entrance stairwell has similar detailing but is narrower.

The offices on the ground floor are accessed from central corridors with semi-circular arched doorways to each end. The rooms retain their original spatial forms with some changes to doorways, some added internal glazing and refurbishment of tiling and fittings to the lavatory areas. The Constables' Day Room continues to be used for this purpose. The insertion of a mezzanine to the former Sergeant's clerks office has disrupted the form of this room. The dormitory accommodation on the first floor retains its spatial integrity and now accommodates offices and associated storage and interview rooms. The tilting fanlights to the bedrooms remain along with window and door joinery, architraves, skirtings, picture rails, fibrous cement ceilings with timber cover strips. The recreation room is now a locker room and opens to the balcony overlooking Wickham Street. The balcony has a concrete floor, decorative wrought iron balustrading and four half-height Doric columns. The balcony affords views across to Holy Trinity Church and associated grounds.

The rear courtyard contains the lavatory block and a two vehicle garage. A retaining wall separates the yard from the adjacent police car parking area which looks onto the former Fortitude Valley State School. This car parking area adjacent to the School was used as a playground by pupils attending the former Fortitude Valley State School until the 1940s.

== Heritage listing ==
Fortitude Valley Police Station was listed on the Queensland Heritage Register on 24 June 1999 having satisfied the following criteria.

The place is important in demonstrating the evolution or pattern of Queensland's history.

Constructed in 1936, the Fortitude Valley Police Station was the second purpose-built police station erected on the police reserve. The prominent siting, scale and form of this distinctive L-shaped building to the corner of Brookes and Wickham Streets demonstrate the emerging importance of Fortitude Valley as an urban centre and the development of law and order services in the district. The Station provides evidence of the evolution of the role of police and police stations in a major urban district illustrating the decreasing importance of the provision of a supporting accommodation function to the establishment of the Station as an official base for extended police operations.

The place is important in demonstrating the principal characteristics of a particular class of cultural places.

The site has had a continuous association with law enforcement activities since 1889 and the present Fortitude Valley Police Station has been operating as a police station for the Fortitude Valley district since 1936. The place is a fine example of the planning of a 1930s police station with barracks though the barracks are now adapted for use as offices.

The place is important because of its aesthetic significance.

A L-shaped, two-storeyed, red facebrick building with contrasting rendered dressings, the Fortitude Valley Police Station is a building on an arterial road and forms an part of a group of community service buildings within the area. The Station provides a civic presence and contributes to the streetscape. The detailing, use of materials and composition illustrate competency in design and workmanship.

The Fortitude Valley Police Station is important for its intact exterior and for its surviving interiors particularly the main entrance lobby, hall and main stair.

The Fortitude Valley Police Station is surrounded by recreational, law enforcement and educational buildings and associated grounds formed by the Holy Trinity Church, Holy Trinity Rectory, Valley Swimming Baths, former Fortitude Valley State School and present Fortitude Valley State School.

The place has a special association with the life or work of a particular person, group or organization of importance in Queensland's history.

The Fortitude Valley Police Station has a special association with Queensland Police, demonstrating the evolution of work practices and the changing nature of the lifestyle associated with police work in a major urban district.

The Fortitude Valley Police Station is important for its association with the extensive public works building program undertaken by the Forgan Smith Government throughout Queensland during the 1930s. The place is an important building within the body of work produced by the Department of Public Works in the first half of the 20th century. The Fortitude Valley Police Station is important for its association with the architect Raymond Clare Nowland. The building is one of the most notable structures designed by Nowland, an architect of considerable talent working in the Department of Public Works during the period of extensive public works building in the 1930s.
