= Gladstone Post Office =

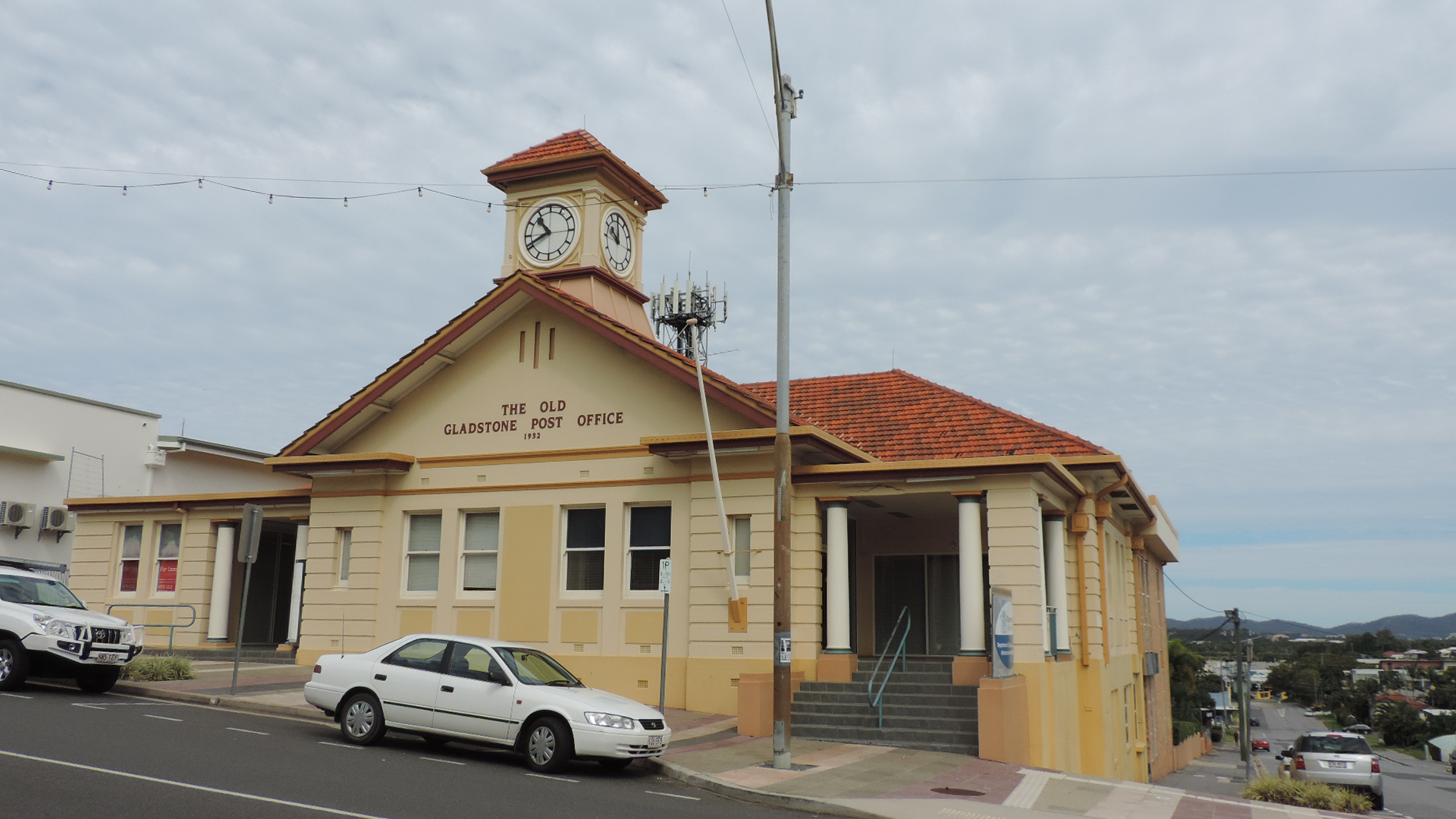
- Former Gladstone Post Office, 2014

- Location within Queensland Location within Australia
- 23.8407°S 151.2536°E
- Location: 33 Goondoon Street, Gladstone, Gladstone Region, Queensland, Australia

History
- Design period: 1919–1930s (interwar period)
- Built: 1932

Site notes
- Architectural style: Classicism

Queensland Heritage Register
- Official name: Gladstone Post Office (former)
- Type: state heritage (built)
- Designated: 7 May 1998
- Reference no.: 601331
- Significant period: 1930s (fabric); 1930s–1990s (historical, social)
- Significant components: tower – clock
- Builders: Relief workers

Gladstone Post Office is a heritage-listed former post office at 33 Goondoon Street, Gladstone, Gladstone Region, Queensland, Australia. It was built in 1932 by relief workers. It was added to the Queensland Heritage Register on 7 May 1998.

== History ==
The former Gladstone Post Office was erected in 1932 as a purpose-designed post office for the Commonwealth Postmaster-General's Department, replacing earlier Post and Telegraph Offices on the same site. The 1932 building was at least the third purpose-built post and telegraph offices in Gladstone, and was designed by the office of the Federal Director-General of Works, Canberra. It was one of several important public buildings erected in Gladstone in the interwar years as work creation schemes, including the 1929 Commonwealth Bank Building, the 1934 Town Council Chambers and the c. 1940 Court House. As a group, these buildings contributed significantly to the development of a 20th-century image for Gladstone, and remain important public landmarks.

Gladstone was established by the New South Wales colonial government in 1854, possibly in an attempt to create a more centralised alternative to Brisbane as the capital of any future northern colony. The town's first post office was gazetted on 1 July 1854, opening in premises at the corner of Goondoon and Yarroon Streets (later the site of the Commercial Hotel). In the late 1850s and early 1860s postal services between Gladstone and Gayndah, Maryborough and Rockhampton were established, and to the Calliope Goldfields in 1864. In 1860, the Brisbane-Gladstone postal service came by fortnightly steamer, increased to a weekly service in 1871. On 28 November 1864 the overland telegraph service was opened to Gladstone, linking the town with Brisbane, Rockhampton and the hinterland.

In 1869 a substantial brick building was erected on the Customs Reserve at the corner of Lord and Goondoon Streets, Gladstone, as a purpose-designed Post and Telegraph Offices and Customs House, with attached residences for the post master and the telegraph master. For a short time, post, telegraph and customs shared this building before it was designated as Gladstone Customs House.

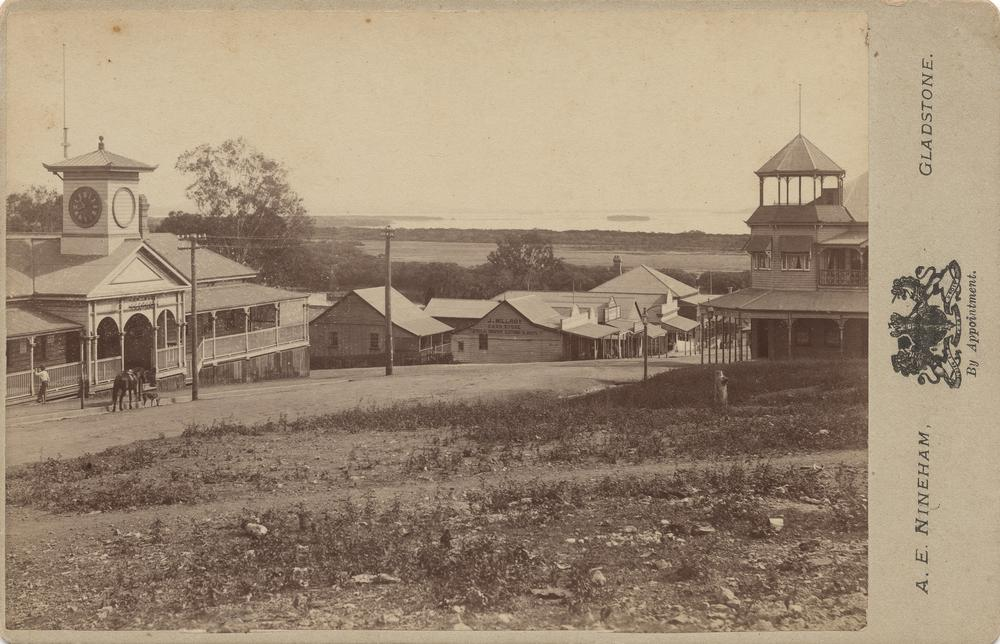
Timber telegraph and post office in Goondoon Street, Gladstone, 1904

The post and telegraph departments then occupied temporary premises until a large timber building with separate offices and residences for post and telegraph was constructed in 1877–1878. This building was erected in Goondoon Street, at the intersection with Yarroon Street, on a prominent and centrally located site gazetted as a Post and Telegraph Reserve. Total expenditure on building and site by the Queensland government in the period 1877–1900 was £3,014. A telephone trunk line office opened at the Gladstone Post & Telegraph Offices on 20 September 1910, but the exchange was not built until 1911.

In 1912, most of Queensland's Post and Telegraph Department's property, including the Gladstone Post and Telegraph Offices, was transferred to the Commonwealth Government.

By the late 1920s, the shabby condition of Gladstone's Post and Telegraph Offices was an embarrassment to the local community. The Commonwealth Government's District Works Inspector, based at Rockhampton, recommended in 1925 and 1927 that the building did not warrant substantial expense on repairs, and recommended that a brick or concrete structure be erected in its place. Still the Postmaster- General's Department failed to act. By late 1928 the condition of the Gladstone Post Office had become an election issue, and in 1929, federal MHR for Capricornia, Mr Frank Forde, lobbied on behalf of his constituents for a new post office.

Finally, provision was made in the estimates of 1930–1931 for a new brick and tile-roofed building, to cost approximately £5,540. However, by the end of 1930, as world-wide economic depression worsened (with primary-producing Australia particularly vulnerable) this proposal was deferred. The depression deepened, and in November 1931, the Federal Works Director for Queensland, James Orwin, recommended to Canberra that urgently required new post offices at Gladstone, Muttaburra, Hughendon and Isisford be erected under relief scheme funding, using day labour. The proposal was accepted, and work on the Gladstone project commenced almost immediately. Before the end of the year, plans and specifications were being prepared by the office of the Director-General of Works, Canberra. By late January 1932, Mr D Gallogly had been engaged as foreman of works and the Post Office half of the 1870s building had been sold for removal.

The new post office was erected on the same reserve as the 1870s building, but with a smaller (66 feet (20 m)) frontage to Goondoon Street. To enable construction of the new building, the Post Office half and clock tower of the 1870s building were removed first, and the post office temporarily shared facilities with the telegraph office. When the new building was completed, the old Telegraph Offices were removed, leaving a frontage of 64 feet (20 m) to Goondoon Street for future development.

The new post office was a single-storeyed rendered brick building with symmetrically arranged entrance porches on either side of the front elevation. Unlike the earlier Gladstone Post and Telegraph Offices, the new building did not include quarters for the post master or telegraph master. Only 7 of this "twin porch" type of masonry post office were erected in Queensland in the period 1923–1932, but 25 timber post offices of similar design were erected 1923–1939. The masonry post offices of this era illustrate the transition from timber to masonry post offices in Queensland, and from design by the Queensland Works Department to the Commonwealth Works Department. No new timber post offices were erected in Queensland after 1940, and the masonry post offices erected in the period 1941 to 1952 favoured the "porch, parapet and hip" design.

The Gladstone Post Office was the only one of the Queensland "twin porch" masonry post offices to include a clock tower, illustrating Gladstone's role as an important regional centre. The existing clock mechanism, already recycled from Maryborough and dating to at least 1900, was overhauled and used again in the new building. In 1932 the Gladstone Town Council agreed to illuminate, each night until midnight, the faces of the town clock which was to be installed in the new post office.

The new post office was opened officially on 23 July 1932, when members of the Gladstone Town Council, Chamber of Commerce and Harbour Board were taken on a tour of the building. At the time, the contribution of Mr FM Forde, MHR, in promoting the construction of this building, was acknowledged.

In the second half of the 1940s a two-storeyed rendered-brick Carrier Equipment Building (telephone exchange) was erected on the southern end of the post office reserve, about 20 feet (6.1 m) from the post office building and fronting Goondoon Street. This was extended to the rear in 1965–67, linking the exchange with the 1932 post office. Perhaps at this period, and certainly between 1962 and 1976, the post office building was extended on the southern side to accommodate public telephones.

By 1976, the post office had undergone a number of modifications, including a large, two-storeyed brick extension to the rear of the post office, necessitating the removal of the rear wall of the 1932 building, and changes to the two public entrances. Internal verandahs had been created along the north and east sides by means of a rearrangement of the internal partitions, accommodating an expanded number of private post boxes. By the mid-1990s, changes in postal handling techniques made the building redundant to Australia Post, and it was sold to private enterprise in 1997. The interior has been gutted since, in preparation for an internal refurbishment as offices, but the principal street facades survive reasonably intact, and the prominently positioned building, along with its clock tower, remains an integral element in the Gladstone townscape.

== Description ==
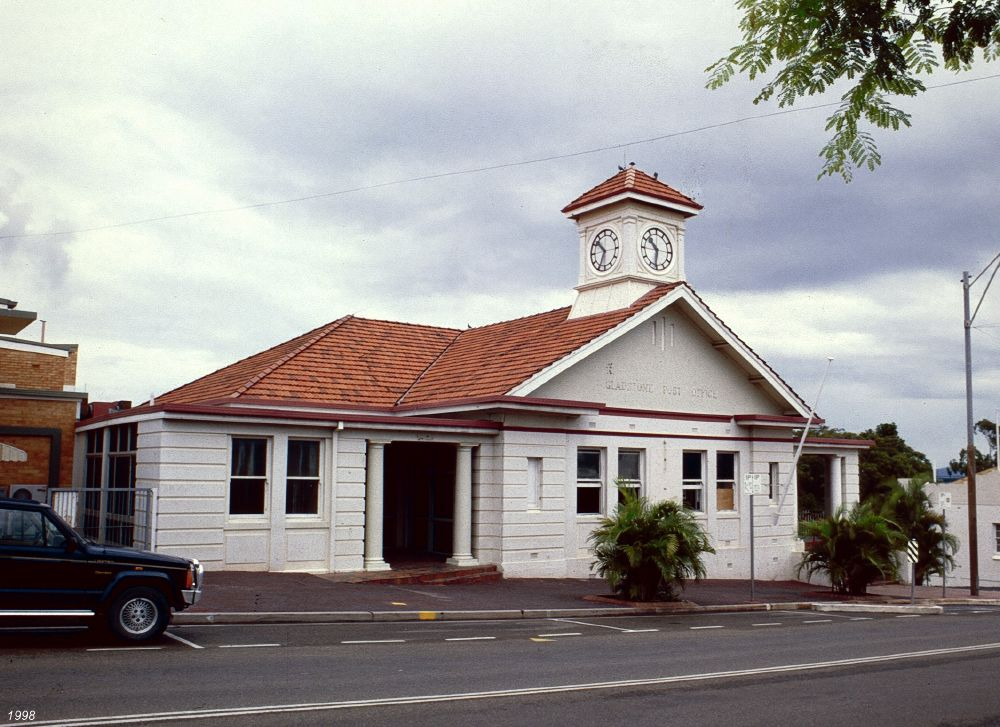
Former Gladstone Post Office, 1998

The former Gladstone Post Office is a single-storeyed rendered masonry building with a terracotta-tiled hipped roof, prominent clock tower and two-storeyed brick extension at the rear of the building. The building is situated in Goondoon Street, the principal street in Gladstone, and overlooks the harbour.

The principal facade of the building is to Goondoon Street with two flat roofed porches either side of a protruding gable. The building is designed in a stripped classical style. The clock tower sits above the gabled-end; it is square in plan, has a four-faced clock and is capped with a pyramidal terracotta roof. Below the clock tower the gable-end elevation has two sets of paired sash timber windows arranged symmetrically. There is evidence in the triangular pediment of the gable of the original signage.

The entrance to the twin porches is marked by two simple columns. The northern porch is entered by a flight of steps; aluminium shop fronts and doors give access to the building. The southern porch has been extended along the southern elevation of the building. The extension is rendered masonry, with paired sash windows and a flat metal deck roof. The southern porch has aluminium shop fronts and doors.

The northern elevation of the buildings has two sets of timber sash windows symmetrically arranged. The basement level below has three multi-paned timber sash windows.

Internally the main Goondoon Street level of the 1932 Post Office is one large open space. The original timber floor is extant, as is some remnant light internal partitioning. The ceiling has been removed as part of the process of refurbishing the building. The back wall of the original building was demolished when the extension was constructed.

The two-storeyed face brick rear extension has a flat roof. A concrete stairway leads to the lower level which contains a number of small rooms and connects with the two basement rooms of the 1932 building.

== Heritage listing ==
The former Gladstone Post Office was listed on the Queensland Heritage Register on 7 May 1998 having satisfied the following criteria.

The place is important in demonstrating the evolution or pattern of Queensland's history.

The former Gladstone Post Office, erected in 1932, is important in illustrating the pattern of development of Gladstone as a regional centre. As one of a group of employment-generating public buildings erected in Gladstone during the interwar period, (including the 1929 Commonwealth Bank Building, the 1934 Town Council Chambers and the c. 1940 Court House), the former Post Office is significant in illustrating a more positive impact of the interwar economic depression on regional Queensland.

The place is important because of its aesthetic significance.

As a group, these buildings contributed significantly to the development of a 20th-century image for Gladstone, and remain important public landmarks. The prominently positioned former Post Office with clock tower retains a reasonably intact street exterior, and remains an integral element, with landmark status, in the Gladstone townscape.

The place has a strong or special association with a particular community or cultural group for social, cultural or spiritual reasons.

As a group, these buildings contributed significantly to the development of a 20th-century image for Gladstone, and remain important public landmarks. The prominently positioned former Post Office with clock tower retains a reasonably intact street exterior, and remains an integral element, with landmark status, in the Gladstone townscape.
