= Gladstone Regional Art Gallery and Museum =

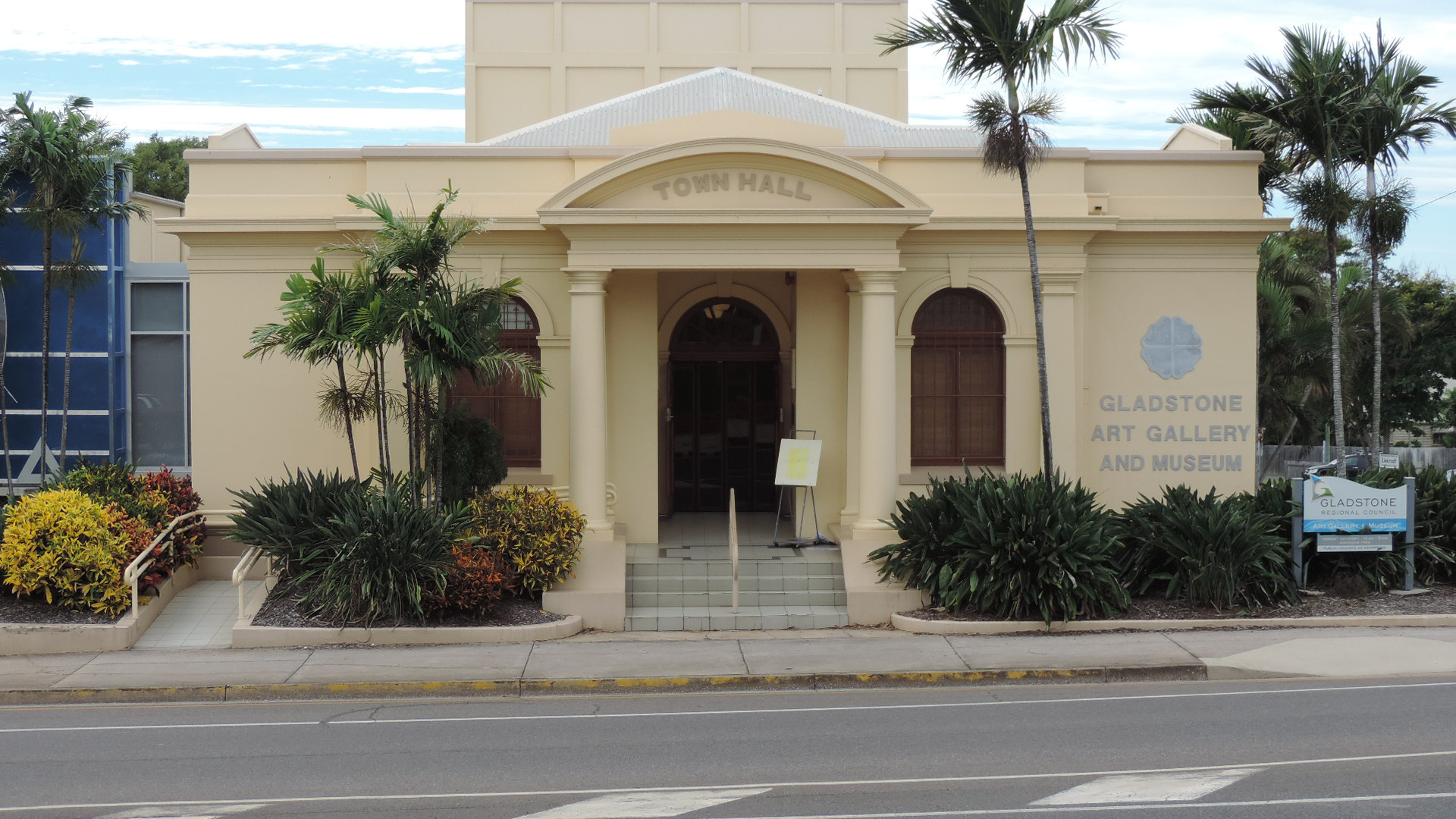
- Gladstone Regional Art Gallery and Museum, 2014

- Location within Queensland Location within Australia
- 23.8451°S 151.2575°E
- Location: 144 Goondoon Street, Gladstone, Gladstone Region, Queensland, Australia

History
- Design period: 1919–1930s (interwar period)
- Built: 1933–1934

Site notes
- Architect: Roy Chipps
- Architectural style: Classicism
- Website: http://gallerymuseum.gladstonerc.qld.gov.au

Queensland Heritage Register
- Official name: Gladstone Regional Art Gallery and Museum, Gladstone Town Hall and Council Chambers
- Type: state heritage (built)
- Designated: 7 July 1998
- Reference no.: 601333
- Significant period: 1930s (historical); 1930s (fabric); 1933–ongoing (social)
- Significant components: tower – fly, memorial – honour board/ roll of honour, council chamber/meeting room, views to, hall, strong room
- Builders: Relief workers

Gladstone Regional Art Gallery and Museum is a heritage-listed former town hall and now art gallery and museum at 144 Goondoon Street, Gladstone, Gladstone Region, Queensland, Australia. It was designed by Roy Chipps and built from 1933 to 1934 by relief workers. It is also known as Gladstone Town Hall & Council Chambers. It was added to the Queensland Heritage Register on 7 July 1998.

== History ==
The Gladstone Regional Art Gallery and Museum, designed by Rockhampton architect Roy Chipps, was erected in 1933–34 as the Gladstone Town Hall and Municipal Chambers. It functioned as such for about 33 years and then as an entertainment venue until 1980, when the City Theatre opened. In 1985 the building was converted to an art gallery and museum. Gladstone was established by the New South Wales government in 1853–54 (prior to the separation of Queensland), possibly in an attempt to create a more centralised alternative to Brisbane as the capital of any future northern colony. The township acquired municipal status in 1863, and the first town hall was erected in 1868 in Goondoon Street, north of the Yarroon Street intersection.

Gladstone languished in the 1870s and 1880s, but in the late 1890s sustained a period of strong development associated with the 1896 opening of the Gladstone meatworks and extension of the railway from Brisbane to Gladstone in the same year. However, by 1900 the cattle tick was decimating the local grazing industry, affecting meatworks production and cattle shipments. This, coupled with the great drought of 1900–02 and the 1903 opening of the Rockhampton extension of the railway which immediately deprived Gladstone of substantial port trade and passenger shipping, caused a crisis in business confidence in the town. The development of a local dairying industry and the 1905 opening of a butter factory at Gladstone, did much to revive the town's fortunes, and sustained the town during the interwar period, when many Gladstone business premises were rebuilt or renovated.

Construction of the 1933–34 town hall, a long-needed project, was made possible by low interest loans and subsidised labour provided by the Queensland Government during the height of the economic depression of the 1930s. Other buildings constructed in Gladstone during this period as employment-generating schemes included the 1929 Commonwealth Bank Building, the 1932 Post Office, and the 1940–42 Court House.

In late 1932, Gladstone Town Council applied for a State Government loan for the erection of a new town hall at the northeast corner of Goondoon and Bramston Streets, and invited competitive designs for the project. This was won by architect Roy Chipps of Rockhampton.

The Queensland Department of Labour granted the Gladstone Town Council a subsidy of nearly £5,000 to employ labour under the Unemployed Worker's Scheme; i.e. men receiving the dole were not eligible for relief work until their sustenance rights were exhausted, and then when given work, were to be employed on a rotational basis of 13 weeks continuous work rather than the 1 or 2 days per week under the usual day labour system.

Work commenced about September 1933, under the foremanship of Mr FH Cecil of Brisbane. Bricks for the building were made in Rockhampton. The original brief and design was for Council Chambers only, but during construction a newly elected Town Council decided to extend the building to include a public hall and stage. The council chambers was already nearing completion, so Chipps had to convert the main chamber into a hall, with a stage and fly tower extension at the eastern end. This work was made possible with an additional State Government loan of £750, granted in January 1934.

The new Gladstone Town Hall and Municipal Chambers was opened officially on Saturday 15 September 1934, by Hon Harry Bruce MLA, Minister for Public Works. For the occasion, the front of the building was garlanded with 40 International Signal Flags borrowed from the Pilot Station at Gatcombe Head. The building was considered a fine ornament to the town. The council offices and meeting room were at the western end of the building, fronting Goondoon Street. The town's First World War Honour Board was relocated from the old council chambers and hung in the new council meeting room. Behind the offices was the public hall, 70 feet (21 m) long by 38.5 feet (11.7 m) wide, accessed via a foyer from Goondoon Street, and from a side entrance facing Bramston Street. A short winding staircase near the proscenium at the eastern end led to the supper room in the basement. Stage, dressing rooms and toilets were accessed from the basement.

Gladstone Town Council's first meeting in the new premises was held on 8 October 1934, and from this time the council chambers at the north end of Goondoon Street was leased to the RSSLIA (Returned Soldiers). The new Town Hall rapidly became the hub of community life, with a weekly baby clinic, "talkies" screened 3 times a week (canvas chairs were placed in the auditorium), balls, stage shows, ALP sponsored bingo, and community group meetings of all kinds. In 1956 a children's library, and in 1957 a small adult library, were opened in the basement of the Town Hall, which no longer functioned as a supper room.

In 1947 the 173rd anniversary of Matthew Flinders' birth was celebrated with tree plantings on Auckland Hill and outside the Gladstone Town Hall, and with the unveiling of a plaque at the hall. Flinders had named and explored Port Curtis in August 1802, during his circumnavigation of the Australian mainland.

Within a decade of its opening, plans were being discussed to replace the Gladstone Town Hall and Municipal Chambers with a larger Civic Centre. These plans were deferred a number of times, and when finally built in 1958–59, the new Civic Centre comprised only one floor, with no council chamber, and no offices for council staff. In 1966 work began on the upper floor of the Civic Centre, and the Gladstone Town Council met there for the first time on 18 December 1967. From this date the principal use of the former Town Hall and Municipal Chambers was as an entertainment and meeting venue. The library in the basement of the Town Hall also was transferred to the Civic Centre in the 1960s.

The first Gladstone City Council (1976–79) built a new library and art gallery, established an immunisation centre, chose a site for a City Theatre and planned its construction – all of which contributed to the redundancy of the 1934 Town Hall. In 1980 the new City Theatre opened, and in 1984–85 the Gladstone City Council converted the former Town Hall and Municipal Chambers into an art gallery and museum, to provide the citizens of Gladstone and visitors to the city with a venue in which to view art, of all media, by professional and amateur artists from locally and elsewhere and to acquaint themselves with the cultural and historic heritage of the area. The Gladstone Regional Art Gallery and Museum was opened officially on 3 April 1985. The refurbishment necessitated the installation of "total environment control", filling-in of the proscenium arch over the stage, and removal of the internal stairs from the hall to the basement.

== Description ==
The Gladstone Regional Art Gallery and Museum is situated on the corner of Bramston Street and Goondoon Street, which is the principal street of Gladstone. The Art Gallery and Museum is a single-storeyed masonry building, with a basement level, designed in a free classical style.

The main entrance to the building is from Goodoon Street through a portico with Doric columns and an arched entablature with "TOWN HALL" in raised lettering. The doorway is in an arched opening with decorative double doors and fanlight. On either side of the entrance portico are arched windows and pilasters; this western elevation is finished with a parapet and flagpole. Behind the parapet is a hipped roof clad in corrugated iron. The building is rendered and the details are moulded plasterwork. The side elevations of the building contain sash windows and decorative fanlights with a pattern of radiating glazing bars. This is a motif that is used throughout the glazing in the building. The southern elevation to Bramston Street has a secondary entrance to the building. A flight of steps with wrought iron lamp stands leads to an arched doorway. At the eastern end of the building is the concrete-framed fly tower.

Internally the plan of the building is a central hallway, with rooms on either side, that opens onto the large space that was formerly the hall. The entrance vestibule has silky oak panelling to door head height, silky oak doors and fanlights all with the radiating glazing bars. Opening off the hallway to the north is the room that was the Council chamber. This room contains a very fine timber First World War honour board. The former Council chamber and hallway are connected by a hatch with a writing slope. On the southern side of the hallway are two rooms and a strong room.

The former hall has been renovated to become an art gallery. This room has been lined so that the windows are covered, the proscenium arch has been removed and a wall placed between the former stage area and the hall. The room has two exposed air conditioning ducts running its length and a suspended track lighting system. The room has a curved ceiling with exposed timber trusses. The fly tower is used as a store room with a mezzanine above the stage area. The basement area is entered from Bramston Street and is also used for storage.

== Heritage listing ==
Gladstone Regional Art Gallery and Museum was listed on the Queensland Heritage Register on 7 July 1998 having satisfied the following criteria.

The place is important in demonstrating the evolution or pattern of Queensland's history.

Gladstone Regional Art Gallery and Museum, erected in 1933–34 as the Gladstone Town Hall and Municipal Chambers, is important in illustrating the pattern of development of Gladstone as a regional centre. As one of a group of employment-generating public buildings erected in Gladstone during the interwar period, (including the 1929 Commonwealth Bank Building, the 1932 Post Office and the 1940–42 Court House), the former town hall is significant in illustrating a more positive impact of the interwar economic depression on regional Queensland. As a group, these buildings contributed significantly to the development of a 20th-century image for Gladstone, and the former town hall remains one of the town's most prestigious buildings.

The place is important in demonstrating the principal characteristics of a particular class of cultural places.

The conversion into an art gallery and museum in 1984–85 necessitated some alterations, but the building remains sufficiently intact to be important in demonstrating the principal characteristics of a regional town hall and municipal chambers of the interwar period, designed in a classically derived style.

It is a fine example of the public work of Rockhampton architect Roy Chipps.

The place is important because of its aesthetic significance.

Located on a corner block in the main street of Gladstone, the building has strong streetscape presence and townscape value.

The place has a strong or special association with a particular community or cultural group for social, cultural or spiritual reasons.

It is valued by the local community for its strong association with municipal government and community activities and entertainments since the 1930s, for its present role as the town's principal repository of Gladstone's history, and for its aesthetic value.
