= Raymond Clare Nowland =

Australian architect (1894–1973)

Raymond Clare Nowland (1894–1973) was an architect in Australia. Many of his buildings are listed on the Queensland Heritage Register.

== Early life ==
Raymond Clare Nowland was born in Sydney in 1894. Nowland studied at Sydney Technical College and the Architectural Association in London.

== Career ==
On returning to Australia, Nowland was employed by the Commonwealth Government from 1920 to 1926. Nowland then moved to Queensland, practicing as an Architect and Town planner in Brisbane. Nowland joined the architectural office of the Department of Public Works in the Queensland Government in November 1932 where he became a senior architect in 1938. He produced the most significant buildings of his career between 1932 and 1942.

Nowland also had some private practice in which he proposed developments for Mount Tamborine and housing estates in Coorparoo for property developer Robert George Oates.

== Later life ==
Nowland died in Brisbane in 1973.

== Works ==
His works include:

- University of Queensland Mayne Medical School, Herston (1939)
- Brisbane Dental Hospital and College (1941)
- Petrie Terrace Police Depot (1942)
- Cairns Court House Complex (1945)
- Rockhampton Court and Administrative Complex
- Toowoomba Police Station Complex
- Maryborough Government Offices Building
- Fortitude Valley Police Station
- Gladstone Court House
- Lister House
