= Brisbane Dental Hospital and College =

Heritage-listed hospital building in Brisbane, Queensland

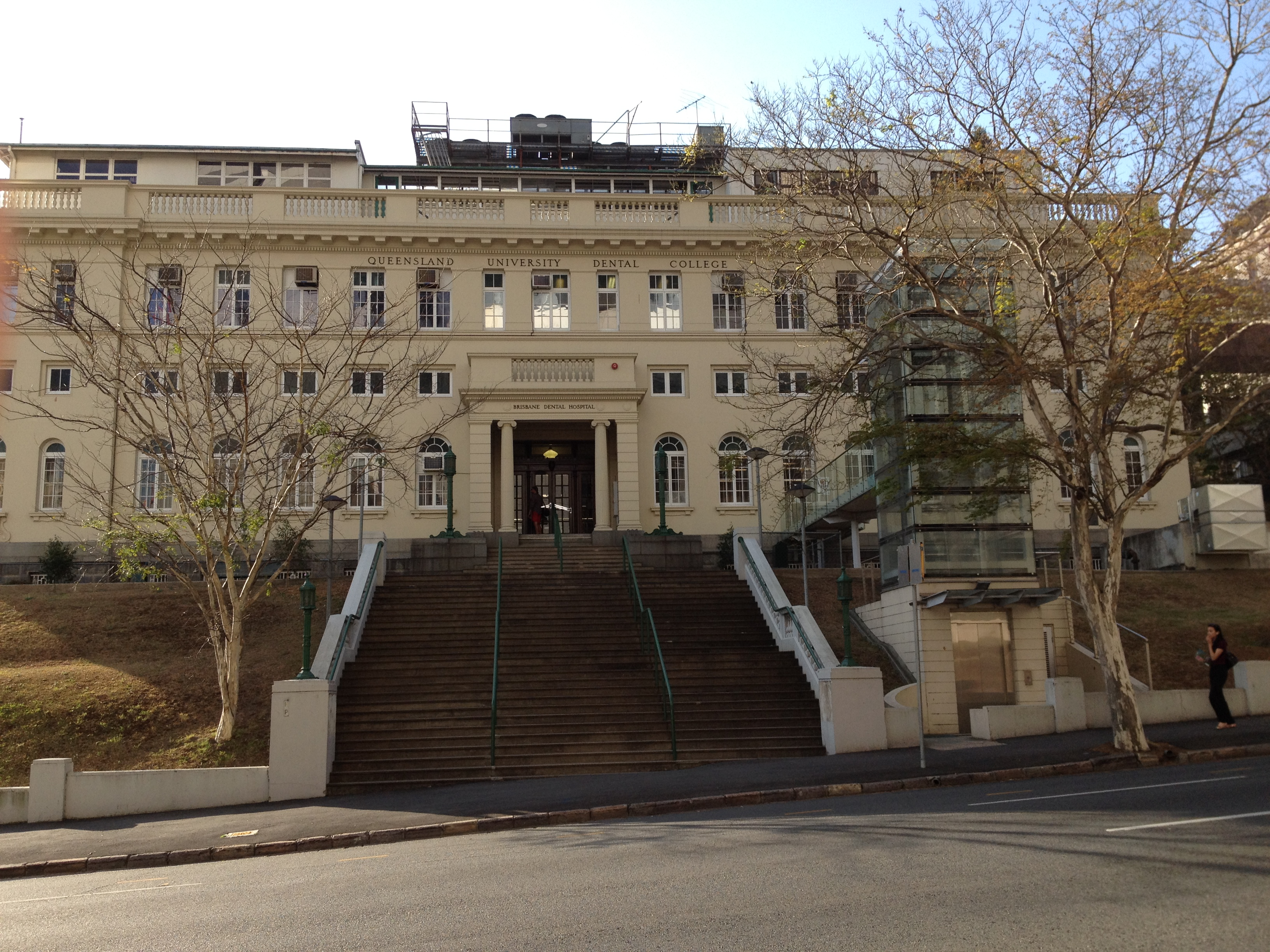
- Brisbane Dental Hospital and College, 2013

- Location within Queensland Location within Australia
- 27.4669°S 153.0231°E
- Location: 168 Turbot Street, Brisbane City, Queensland, Australia

History
- Design period: 1919–1930s (interwar period)
- Built: 1938–1941

Site notes
- Architect: Raymond C Nowland
- Architectural style: neo-Georgian

Queensland Heritage Register
- Official name: Brisbane Dental Hospital and College
- Type: state heritage (built)
- Designated: 23 April 1999
- Reference no.: 601909
- Significant period: 1938–1949 (fabric); 1930s–1940s (historical); 1940s–ongoing (social)
- Significant components: steps/stairway, wall/s, terracing, courtyard, surgery – dental, theatre – lecture, trees/plantings
- Builders: Queensland Department of Public Works

Brisbane Dental Hospital and College is a heritage-listed former dental hospital at 168 Turbot Street, Brisbane City, Queensland, Australia. It was designed by Raymond C Nowland and built from 1938 to 1941 by the Queensland Department of Public Works. It was added to the Queensland Heritage Register on 23 April 1999.

== History ==
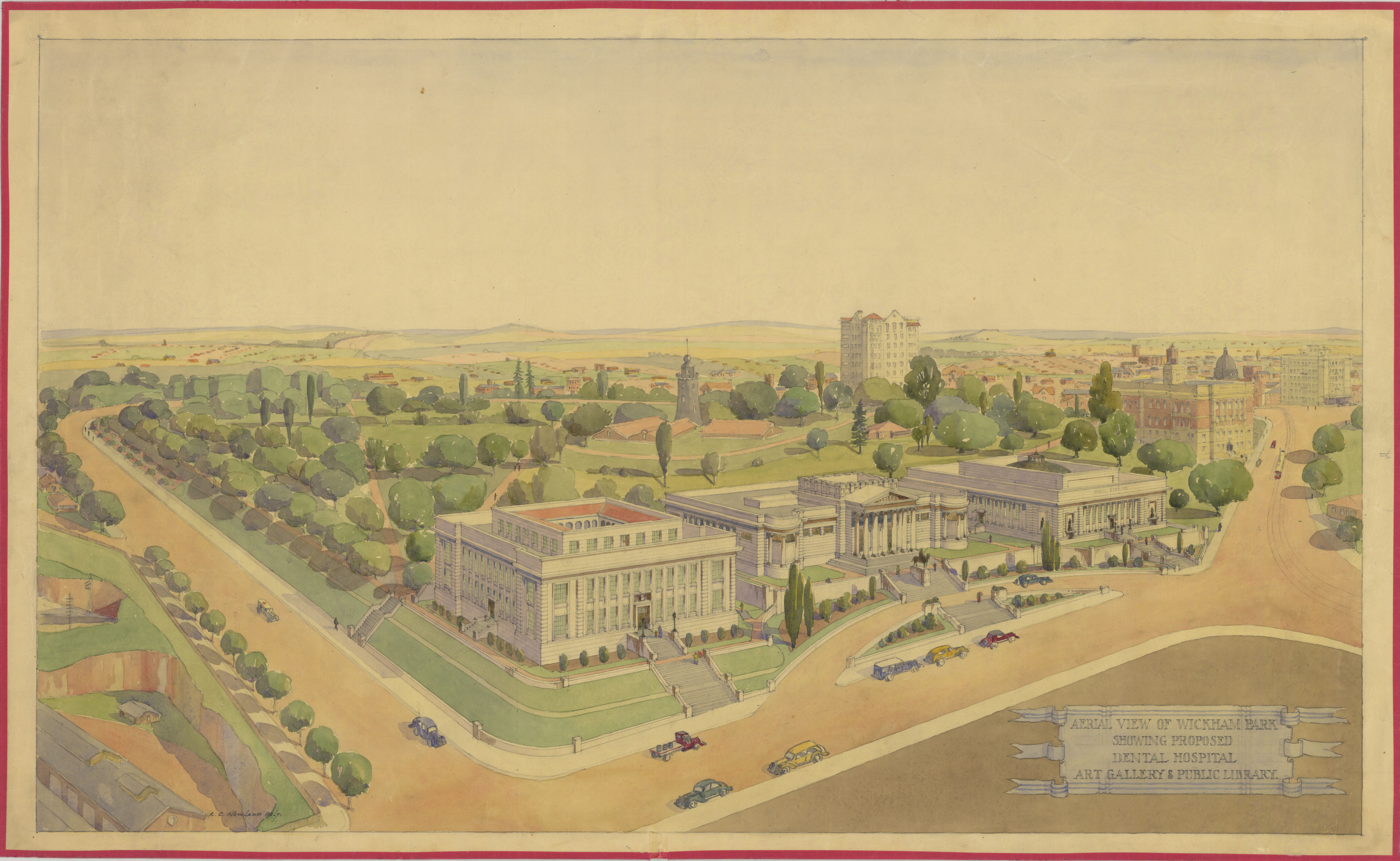
Aerial perspective view showing the proposed Dental Hospital, Art Gallery and Public Library, 1938

Opened in 1941, the Brisbane Dental Hospital and College is an imposing two-storey, rendered masonry, neo-Georgian building looming above the corner to Turbot Street and Albert Streets and surrounded by terraced gardens. The Brisbane Dental Hospital and College was designed to be an integral component of an urban design proposal, The Turbot Street Development Scheme, for the city block bounded by Albert and Turbot Streets, Jacob's Ladder and Wickham Terrace. The Scheme, designed by Raymond Clare Nowland, senior architect in the Queensland Department of Public Works, included a Public Art Gallery, Public Library, the Dental Hospital and College and a beautifying of Wickham Park. The Brisbane Dental Hospital and College was the only part of the scheme to be realised. The site was part of an earlier Brisbane City Council reserve within Wickham Park which was exchanged in the 1930s for State owned land in Adelaide Street, adjacent to the former Supreme Court, enabling Adelaide Street to continue through to North Quay.

From the early twentieth century, there was a general enthusiasm for town planning throughout the British Empire, America, Europe and Australia. Nowland was one of a number of town planning activists in Brisbane advocating the development of a town planning strategy for Brisbane during the 1920s and 1930s. The Turbot Street Development Scheme is one of a number of urban design proposals for Brisbane reflecting this concern. Wickham Park was chosen from among a number of sites as the site for the project. The Scheme excited considerable public interest and comment and there was much discussion about the suitability of the site. It was considered that its central location gave it the advantage of convenience of access to public transport; that the siting of the buildings at a higher level and in a park would ensure a quiet environment and ample natural lighting to the buildings; that it was unlikely that the site would be hemmed in or overshadowed by further development; and that the site lent itself "to artistic approaches and aesthetic surroundings".

The monumentality and civic grandeur given to the Brisbane Dental Hospital and College through its association with a larger urban design proposal in a commanding, inner-city position reflect the importance of the building for the State Government and for the University of Queensland. Speaking at the laying of the foundation stone for the building on 20 March 1938 the Minister for Health and Home Affairs, Edward Hanlon, observed that the building was to harmonise architecturally with its near neighbour, the Brisbane City Hall, making "Turbot Street one of the most beautiful streets in any city in the Commonwealth".

When a Faculty of Dentistry was formed within the University of Queensland in 1935, the Queensland State Government agreed to fund and build a new dental hospital and college. The first public Dental Clinic in Queensland had been established in Brisbane in 1908 and by 1926 the Clinic had been taken over by the Department of Home Affairs and was known as the Brisbane Dental Hospital. The proposed new Dental Hospital was to be the base for the dental services provided by the Brisbane and South Coast Hospitals Board and was part of an overall Government policy to provide public dental services throughout Queensland.

In June 1932 the Forgan Smith Labor Government came to power from a campaign that advocated increased government spending to counter the effects of the Depression. The Forgan Smith Government embarked on a large public works building program designed to promote the employment of local skilled workers, the purchase of local building materials and the production of commodious, low maintenance buildings which would be a long-term asset to the State. This building program included: government offices; schools and colleges; university buildings; court houses and police stations; hospitals and asylums; and gaols.

Many of the programs have had lasting beneficial effects for the citizens of Queensland including the establishment of a system of public health care administered through a range of new hospitals and clinics. Notable projects undertaken include the University of Queensland Mayne Medical School, Herston; the Women's Hospital at the Brisbane General Hospital; the Brisbane Dental Hospital and College; and the Wilson Ophthalmic Hostel.

The Brisbane Dental Hospital and College was a building of major importance to Queensland and among the most ambitious projects within the Forgan Smith Government's building program. Construction commenced in September 1938 and the building was opened 6 July 1941 with Edward Hanlon declaring that the building was "better equipped and finished than any other dental hospital in Australia". The building is important in the overall development of the University of Queensland and the development of facilities for the training of medical and dental practitioners. The University embraced the model for training health practitioners promoted by the American Medical Association which advocated increased laboratory training in basic medical sciences and the use of hospitals for clinical training. The Brisbane Dental Hospital and College reflects this approach to health care training in its provision of specialist laboratories and a training hospital. During this time the architect responsible for the design of the Hospital and College, Raymond Clare Nowland, was also designing the University of Queensland Mayne Medical School which also reflects the adoption of this teaching model.

Raymond Clare Nowland joined the architectural office of the Department of Public Works in November 1932 where he became a senior architect in 1938. He produced the most significant buildings of his career between 1932 and 1942 including the University of Queensland Medical School, Herston (1939); Brisbane Dental Hospital and College (1941); Police Barracks, Petrie Terrace (1942) and the Cairns Court House Complex (1935). Nowland undertook architectural studies at the Sydney Technical College (1911–14) and the Architectural Association School London (1919). In private practice from 1926 to 1932, he undertook a range of domestic and commercial commissions including the Brisbane Clinic, Wickham Terrace, Brisbane (1930). The design of the Brisbane Clinic was influenced by an American medical model, the Mayo Clinic. His preference for designing within a restrained classicism reflects his architectural training, the prevailing professional architectural attitudes and the design direction given by the Chief Architect, A.B. Leven. Along with many British Empire architects of the 1930s both Leven and Nowland shared a respect for simplicity, order and rational planning which in his public work enabled Nowland to make a notable contribution to the architectural fabric of Queensland towns and cities.

In an earlier sketch design vertical emphasis was given to the building by recessed spandrels below the windows at each level. The monumental presence of the building was emphasised by rusticated quoins and pilasters framing the end wings. Changes to the building program, availability of materials, budget restrictions and an augmentation of the program to include servicing and air-conditioning resulted in alterations to the earlier sketch design proposal. The building was to have been constructed of sandstone but difficulties with supply and additional budget restrictions resulted in a substitution of brick and cement render and a reduction in the texture and decoration of the elevations. Considerable foundation work was undertaken to bridge the railway tunnel beneath the site to avoid vibration in the building.

The ground floor accommodated the Dental Hospital and the first floor and roof housed the Dental College. The ground floor provided offices for the Director and support staff, surgeries and associated facilities, and a reception/waiting room. The first floor provided a waiting room, surgeries and associated facilities, staff offices, two lecture theatres and a museum. The flat roof housed the library, upper part of the large lecture theatre and air-conditioning plant. The building program was augmented to include additional servicing so a mezzanine floor was inserted between the ground and first floors to accommodate air-conditioning and servicing to the College level surgeries. The Brisbane Dental Hospital and College was the first public building in Queensland to install air-conditioning. Rubber floors were provided in the surgeries and corridors on each floor, terrazzo was applied to the ground floor entrance and waiting room and other floors were linoleum. The waiting rooms featured Queensland maple panelling and purpose built silky oak furniture.

Additional roof-top accommodation for laboratories and staff, and staff and student common rooms was constructed in 1949. In the 1960s the University of Queensland erected a freestanding building (design by James Birrell) to the northeast, connecting with a walkway to the College level of the earlier building. A small brick extension was erected in the courtyard in 1985. Aggressive refurbishment of the fabric, furniture, fittings and equipment of the Hospital facilities and College surgeries and teaching areas was undertaken from 1997 to 1999. The integrity of the planning has survived along with some internal fabric including the entrance doors and surrounding panelling, timber casement windows, sills, doors, shelving, corridor finishes and three sets of terrazzo stairs. Servicing of surgeries and work areas continues to be facilitated by the mezzanine service floor.

In September 2014, Liberal National Party Minister for Health Lawrence Springborg announced that the buildings would be sold and the dental services relocated to more modern facilities. In January 2015, the University of Queensland relocated its dental college to new premises on the university's Herston campus, and the building was listed for sale.

In March 2015, following the Labor victory at the 2015 state election, new Deputy Premier Jackie Trad announced that the building would not be sold, stating that "Labor will not progress that sale".

The offices and laboratories in the 2018 ABC TV series Harrow are set in the building.

== Description ==
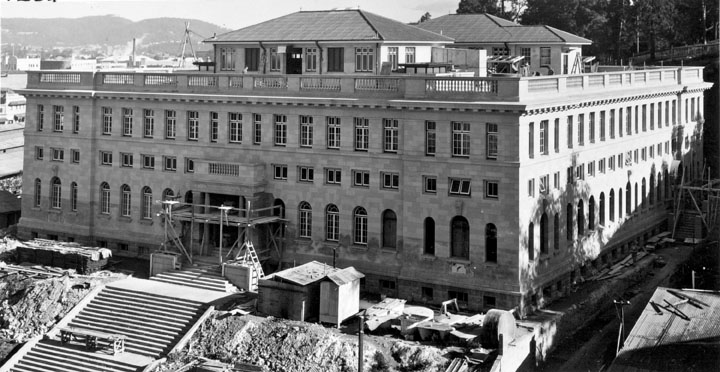
Brisbane Dental Hospital and College, June 1940

Approached by a monumental sweep of wide concrete stairs from Turbot Street, the Brisbane Dental Hospital and College is an imposing, neo-Georgian, two-storey, rendered masonry building on the corner of Albert and Turbot Streets, Brisbane. The building has a steel frame, concrete floors, stands on a rusticated granite base and has rendered facings to all elevations. A balustraded parapet provides a partial screen to roof top structures.

The Dental Hospital occupies the ground floor while the first floor and roof level housed the Dental College of the Faculty of Dentistry of the University of Queensland.

The main elevation to Turbot Street is symmetrical about a projecting entrance porch terminated at each side by slightly projecting wings. Ornamental standard lamps flank the main stairway at the base and at the summit. The entrance porch is defined by fluted Ionic columns and framed by the rusticated pilasters of the enclosing side walls. The internal spatial relationships within the building are expressed by the size and placement of the windows in the elevations. The service mezzanine floor is reflected in the row of small squat timber awning windows between the timber casement windows with arched fanlights of the ground floor and the large rectangular timber casement windows marking the College level on the first floor. A giant order is implied by the rusticated base and the heavy mutuled cornice and imparts a strong and unified character to the building.

The other elevations to the building contain a pattern of windows similar to that of the front elevation. The elevation to Albert Street is a single range terminated by slightly projecting wings; the northeast elevation contains a substantial entry stair and doorway to the Wickham Park wing and a service entry to the basement; and the rear elevation contains a subsidiary entrance to the Albert Street wing.

The building is organised as perimeter wings about a central square courtyard. Within the main entry porch, there is fine decorated timber panel work to the surrounds of the entry doors and restrained decorative plaster work within the porch. The porch opens on to the main vestibule and into the former waiting room overlooking the internal courtyard. Large surgery spaces and smaller rooms for teaching, service spaces and staff offices are organised about central corridors through each wing. Rooms open off the corridors and have views to the surrounding streets or the inner courtyard. There are stairwells off the corridors to each corner of the building. The stairwells contain terrazzo stairs, terrazzo panelling to dado level, plain and twisted steel balustrading and moulded timber handrails and are top-lit by roof lanterns. The stair to the east corner is now enclosed at ground floor level. The stairwell to the north corner travels from the first floor to the roof level only, does not have terrazzo dado panelling and has sheeting to the balustrade of the top flight of the dogleg stair. A dumb waiter in the north corner services each level but is presently sealed over at ground level.

The ground floor and some of the first floor have recently undergone an aggressive refurbishment but the logic of the circulation and the internal spaces remains though fabric has been lost. The former ground floor waiting room, now the reception and administration area, is lit from the courtyard by a bank of full height plain leadlight awning and fixed glass windows which are operated by a manual turning device. The mezzanine between the ground and first floor does not continue over this reception area where the ceiling height is to the level of the mezzanine storey ceiling. The present waiting room occupies the former office suite adjacent to the vestibule. Both the Hospital and College levels have surgeries in the northeast and southwest wings. These are long open rooms subdivided by head height partitioning. The recent refurbishment has removed earlier partitions, equipment, finishes, floor coverings and joinery but the integrity of the spaces has survived. The large timber casement windows with semi-circular fanlights and terrazzo sills remain in the surgeries at the Hospital level and the rectangular timber casement windows survive on the College level. The decorative timber and metal flat arch to the former waiting room and some timber doors remain to the ground floor.

The building was finished throughout with decorative plaster ceilings, Queensland maple joinery and panelling, and purpose-built timber furniture. Original fabric survives, particularly on the first floor where the waiting room and the Professor's room contain fine examples of discreet panelling, joinery and shelving in Queensland maple. The waiting room has four sets of fine Queensland maple doors with discreet plain leadlight glass panels and carved Queensland maple architraves beneath a decorative plaster ceiling coffered by ceiling beams. Purpose-built silky oak furniture remains in use in this area. The galleried lecture theatre has been gutted and is now subdivided into two seminar rooms. The smaller lecture theatre has been partitioned into offices and the museum is now a seminar room. Original finishes, floor coverings and joinery to staff offices and corridors is found on this floor.

The library on the roof is now a seminar room and contains timber shelving to the long sides of the room. The 1949 timber and fibro clad roof buildings continue to accommodate laboratories, staff offices, staff and student common rooms. Additional airconditioning plant has been located on the roof. Roofing to the south stairwell lantern has rolled ridge flashing.

There is a commemorative plaque in the external wall to the east corner of the Turbot Street elevation recording the laying of the foundation stone and a plaque commemorating the opening of the building in the southwest wall of the main entry porch.

The concreted courtyard in the centre of the building was to be laid out with gardens and a central fountain and acts as a light well for the building which encircles it. It was accessed from the main waiting room in the Turbot Street wing, the extraction waiting room in the northeast wing and the Junior Common Room in the Wickham Park wing. It is no longer accessed from the northeast wing and the 1985 brick extension projects from the Wickham Park wing at ground level. Air-conditioning and laboratory extraction ducts now encroach into the courtyard area.

From a masonry wall at street level, steep, grassed, battered banks rise up to two terraced levels to the Albert and Turbot Streets sides of the building. The upper level terrace has a concrete path and a row of pines marching around the building to the Albert and Turbot Streets elevations. A service lane to the northeast of the building off Turbot Street allows ambulance access to the rear and side. A set of concrete steps from Albert Street arrives to the rear of the building.

== Heritage listing ==
Brisbane Dental Hospital and College was listed on the Queensland Heritage Register on 23 April 1999 having satisfied the following criteria.

The place is important in demonstrating the evolution or pattern of Queensland's history.

The Brisbane Dental Hospital and College is important in demonstrating the development of public dental services and the training of dental practitioners in Queensland. The Dental Hospital is an important component in the development of the public health scheme for Queensland initiated by the Forgan Smith Government in the 1930s and continues to provide public dental services. As the first College for the Faculty of Dentistry of the University of Queensland, the building is important in demonstrating the development of the University and the training of dentists in Queensland.

The Dental Hospital and College is important in the development of the University of Queensland and in the training of medical and dental practitioners. The planning of the Brisbane Dental Hospital and College, with the inclusion of specialist laboratories for teaching and research and proximity to a hospital, is important for demonstrating the adoption of the American teaching model which advocated increased laboratory training in basic medical sciences and the use of hospitals for clinical training.

The place demonstrates rare, uncommon or endangered aspects of Queensland's cultural heritage.

The Brisbane Dental Hospital and College is important as the only Dental Hospital and College in Queensland.

The place is important in demonstrating the principal characteristics of a particular class of cultural places.

The Brisbane Dental Hospital and College is a fine example of a building planned to accommodate highly serviced medical facilities. The layout and commodity of the spaces survives having accommodated the late 1990s aggressive refurbishment work undertaken to comply with contemporary health regulations and advances in technology.

The Brisbane Dental Hospital and College is an important building in the body of public buildings designed by the Department of Public Works in Queensland. The Brisbane Dental Hospital and College is one of an impressive suite of important government buildings erected throughout Queensland designed in a classical idiom during the 1930s.

The place is important because of its aesthetic significance.

In a restrained neo-Georgian idiom, the Brisbane Dental Hospital and College has aesthetic and architectural significance. With planar crispness and subtle detailing, it is a robust public building with a monumental street presence. An important component in an unrealised urban design scheme planned for Turbot Street and Wickham Park in the 1930s, The Turbot Street Development Scheme, the Brisbane Dental Hospital and College is a landmark building occupying a busy city corner. The Brisbane Dental Hospital and College is important as the only built work in this ambitious scheme of public buildings.

The Brisbane Dental Hospital and College is important for its fine rare interiors including the entrance porch and decorative timber surrounds and timber doors to the main entrance; the stairwells and roof lanterns; the waiting room and associated furniture on the first floor; the Professor's room on the first floor; corridors and staff offices on the first floor; surviving joinery to the ground floor. The integrity of the spatial relationships within the building are important including the volume of the former ground floor waiting room with the accompanying bank of windows to the courtyard. The courtyard is important to the building. The associated grounds are important to the building including the impressive sweep of concrete stairs with flanking standard lamps from Turbot Street.

The place is important in demonstrating a high degree of creative or technical achievement at a particular period.

A highly serviced building, the design of the Brisbane Dental Hospital and College demonstrates the focus on the application of technological advances in the delivery of health care prevailing in the 1930s and incorporates innovative technical features. The building is important as the first public building in Brisbane to install a fully integrated air conditioning system. The insertion of a mezzanine floor to accommodate air-conditioning and servicing of surgeries and work areas enabled the Hospital and College to incorporate technological developments and service the building efficiently and effectively. Inclusion of these extensive servicing features has facilitated the incorporation of late twentieth century technological advances introduced in the late 1990s refurbishment.

The place has a special association with the life or work of a particular person, group or organisation of importance in Queensland's history.

The Brisbane Dental Hospital and College is important for its association with the architect Raymond Clare Nowland. The building is one of the most notable structures designed by Nowland, an architect of considerable talent working in the Department of Public Works during the period of extensive public works building in the 1930s.
