= Commonwealth Bank Building, Gladstone =

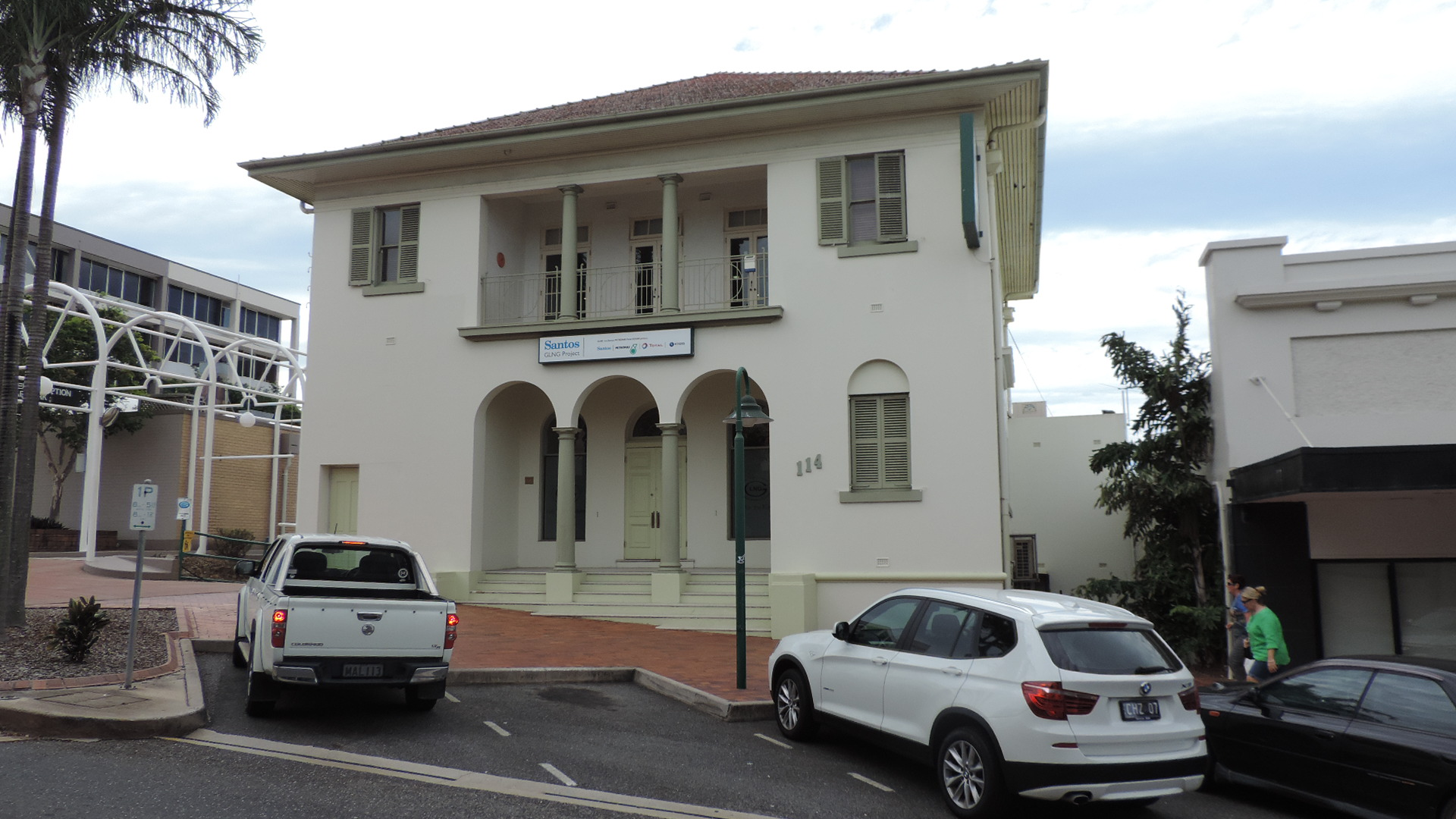
- Santos House, former Commonwealth Bank, 2014

- Location within Queensland Location within Australia
- 23.8431°S 151.2561°E
- Location: 114 Goondoon Street, Gladstone Central, Gladstone, Gladstone Region, Queensland, Australia

History
- Design period: 1919–1930s (interwar period)
- Built: 1928–1929

Site notes
- Architectural style: Mediterranean

Queensland Heritage Register
- Official name: Commonwealth Bank Building (former)
- Type: state heritage (built)
- Designated: 28 July 2000
- Reference no.: 601338
- Significant period: 1920s (fabric); 1929–1972 (historical use by Commonwealth bank)
- Significant components: basement / sub-floor, loggia/s, banking chamber, trees/plantings, strong room

Commonwealth Bank Building is a heritage-listed former bank building at 114 Goondoon Street, Gladstone Central, Gladstone, Gladstone Region, Queensland, Australia. It was built from 1928 to 1929. It was added to the Queensland Heritage Register on 28 July 2000.

== History ==
This two-storeyed masonry building was constructed in 1928–29 as banking offices and bank manager's residence for the Commonwealth Bank of Australia, and remained the bank's principal Gladstone branch until February 1972.

The federal government's Commonwealth Bank Act 1911 established Australia's first bank empowered to conduct both savings and general (trading) bank business, with the security of a federal government guarantee.

On 16 September 1912 the Savings Bank Department of the Commonwealth Bank (later the Commonwealth Savings Bank) commenced business in Queensland. The new bank established a main office in Brisbane, and operated branches through the 194 post offices throughout Queensland which had been transferred to the Commonwealth after Federation, and which previously had acted as agencies for the (Queensland) Government Savings Bank (established in 1864 by act of Queensland Parliament). The Gladstone Post Office remained the Commonwealth Bank's representative in Gladstone until 1921.

The Queensland Government Savings Bank had established a regional branch at Gladstone in June 1912 in rented premises on the eastern side of Goondoon Street, between Lord and Yarroon Streets, formerly occupied by the Commercial Banking Company of Sydney. In December 1920 the Queensland Government Savings Bank was absorbed by the Commonwealth Government Savings Bank, following which the Commonwealth Bank's Gladstone Post Office agency was closed and all business moved to the former Queensland Government Savings Bank's premises in Goondoon Street, opening there on 3 January 1921 as the Commonwealth Bank and providing full commercial and savings bank facilities.

By the 1920s Gladstone's business heart was shifting south toward the Gladstone railway station, and the Commonwealth Bank decided to erect purpose-designed banking premises closer to the centre of business. In 1927 vacant land in Goondoon Street, between William and Roseberry Streets, was purchased for £700 from J. Friend. In 1928 plans were prepared by the Commonwealth Department of Works and Railways for a substantial, two-storeyed "Spanish style" brick building, with ground floor banking chamber and upstairs manager's residence. The use of Mediterranean ('Spanish') style was in vogue for both domestic and commercial buildings in Australia and overseas at this period, and the Commonwealth Bank, like other financial institutions, was keen to reflect through its buildings a modern, progressive and reliable approach to successful money management. Other popular architectural styles favoured by the bank at this period were stripped classical and moderne.

Tenders were called in September 1928, and the job was let in November to local Gladstone contractor Mr F. F. Hill, with a tender price of £8,384 and a completion date of 30 April 1929. This was extended to 17 August 1929, and the bank opened for business in September 1929.

At the time of completion, the building was described as the finest banking chamber in Gladstone. Entrance to the new branch was through a small colonnade leading to a centrally located doorway into the banking chamber on the ground floor. The manager's office was located at the front, and the main counter, which housed three teller boxes, ran across the width of the banking chamber. Behind this were the strong room, staff facilities and store room. The manager's three bedroom residence was located on the upper level.

During the Second World War the Gladstone branch of the Commonwealth Bank became heavily involved with Commonwealth bonds and other forms of government fund-raising for the war effort, and was the local agent for the meat and clothing rationing authorities.

During the late 1940s and 1950s, the Commonwealth Bank expanded its activities Australia-wide, opening hundreds of branches and agencies to cater for the increase and spread of population accompanying Australia's great post-war migrant influx, and reflecting the buoyant national economy of the 1950s. In December 1959 the Commonwealth Bank of Australia was restructured and renamed the Commonwealth Banking Corporation.

In the 1960s and 1970s Gladstone entered a new period of prosperity with the establishment of an alumina refinery, an alumina smelter, a cement clinker plant, a huge regional power station, and three separate coal loading facilities. As early as 1970, the growth of business through the Commonwealth Banking Corporation's Gladstone office had increased to over 7,800 savings accounts and 800 cheque accounts, and the existing premises were proving inadequate for the conduct of bank business. In June 1970 a vacant site in Goondoon Street, directly opposite the 1928–29 building, was purchased, and larger bank offices were erected there in 1971–72. The new premises opened in February 1972, and the old premises were sold a month later.

Conversion of the upper floor to offices necessitated the removal of most of the original internal partitioning on that floor. In 2015, the building is occupied by the Gladstone office of Santos Limited, an oil and gas company.

== Description ==
The former Commonwealth Bank Building in Goondoon Street, Gladstone, is a two-storeyed brick and concrete building with sub-floor, located in what has been the heart of the city's commercial precinct since the 1920s. It is one of Gladstone's more substantial interwar commercial buildings, and is designed in a restrained Mediterranean style, with a colonnaded entry porch, arched windows, and a terracotta tiled roof. The plan of the building is typical of 19th and 20th century bank buildings with a banking chamber at ground floor level and a residence for the manager on the second floor level.

The building is rectangular in plan, narrower across the street frontage than the depth, and is built up to the street alignment. It has been extended at the rear. It occupies approximately half of the block, with a bitumen carpark at the rear, accessed via a driveway off Goondoon Street along the north side of the building. There are several mature trees along the perimeter of the back yard, possibly related to the period of occupation of the first floor of the building as a bank manager's residence. The site slopes considerably to the rear (east) and to the south, accommodating a basement level with what was formerly a strongroom.

The building has concrete foundations, staircase, verandah floors and strong room. The external and internal walls are rendered brickwork. Internally the floors are timber The terracotta tiled roof is pyramid-shaped, with wide-eaves.

The principal facade of the building facing Goondoon Street has a central recessed entrance porch which leads to the banking chamber. A small flight of steps lead to the 3-arched colonnaded porch. Above the entrance porch the first-floor verandah, which mirrored the entrance porch, has been enclosed with glazing panels. Another first floor verandah on the southern side of the building has been enclosed with brickwork and a small row of windows.

The symmetry of the street facade has been marred with the conversion of a window to the left of the front entrance into a doorway, to provide street access to the internal staircase leading to the upper floor. The original external side access has been enclosed. Most of the other external openings survive and retain their original joinery.

The ground floor, which remains in use as a banking chamber, has undergone refurbishment - including the insertion of a false ceiling and air conditioning ducting. However the space remains substantially intact. The timber counter and teller boxes have been removed, but the fine entrance, manager's office and rear ancillary rooms remain, and the original function of this space can be understood. There is an internal staircase at the rear southeast corner leading to the basement, which also is accessed externally at ground level from the rear of the building.

The first floor is reached via an internal and original timber staircase at the northwest corner of the building, which now is accessed only from the front street. The upper floor has been gutted and refurbished as office space not associated with the bank on the ground floor, hence the alterations to create a separate entrance. There is a set of external timber back stairs leading from the first floor to the back yard, at the original northeast corner of the building.

There is a concrete block extension, two-storeyed with sub-floor, at the rear. This has necessitated little alteration to the main building, with the former rear external wall now an internal partition.

== Heritage listing ==
The former Commonwealth Bank Building was listed on the Queensland Heritage Register on 28 July 2000 having satisfied the following criteria.

The place is important in demonstrating the evolution or pattern of Queensland's history.

The former Commonwealth Bank Building, Gladstone, erected 1928–29, is important in illustrating the pattern of development of Gladstone as a regional centre. As one of a group of employment-generating public buildings erected in Gladstone during the interwar period, (including the 1932 Post Office, 1934 Town Council Chambers, and 1940–42 Court House), the former Commonwealth Bank Building is significant in illustrating the less negative impact of the interwar economic depression on regional Queensland.

The place is important in demonstrating the principal characteristics of a particular class of cultural places.

The two-storeyed former banking premises remains sufficiently intact to illustrate the quality of interwar Commonwealth public works design; the exterior in particular still demonstrates the intention of the design to impress, and the building remains an integral component of the principal Gladstone streetscape.

The place is important because of its aesthetic significance.

The two-storeyed former banking premises remains sufficiently intact to illustrate the quality of interwar Commonwealth public works design; the exterior in particular still demonstrates the intention of the design to impress, and the building remains an integral component of the principal Gladstone streetscape.

The place has a strong or special association with a particular community or cultural group for social, cultural or spiritual reasons.

As a group, these buildings contributed significantly to the development of a 20th century image for Gladstone, and remain important public landmarks.

The place has a special association with the life or work of a particular person, group or organisation of importance in Queensland's history.

The place is significant for its strong association with the work of the Commonwealth Bank in Gladstone over four decades (1929–1972), during which time the town sustained the deepest economic depression of the 20th century, survived the worst global conflict of the 20th century, and finally, entered the greatest period of prosperity since the founding of Gladstone in 1853–54.
