= University of Queensland Mayne Medical School =

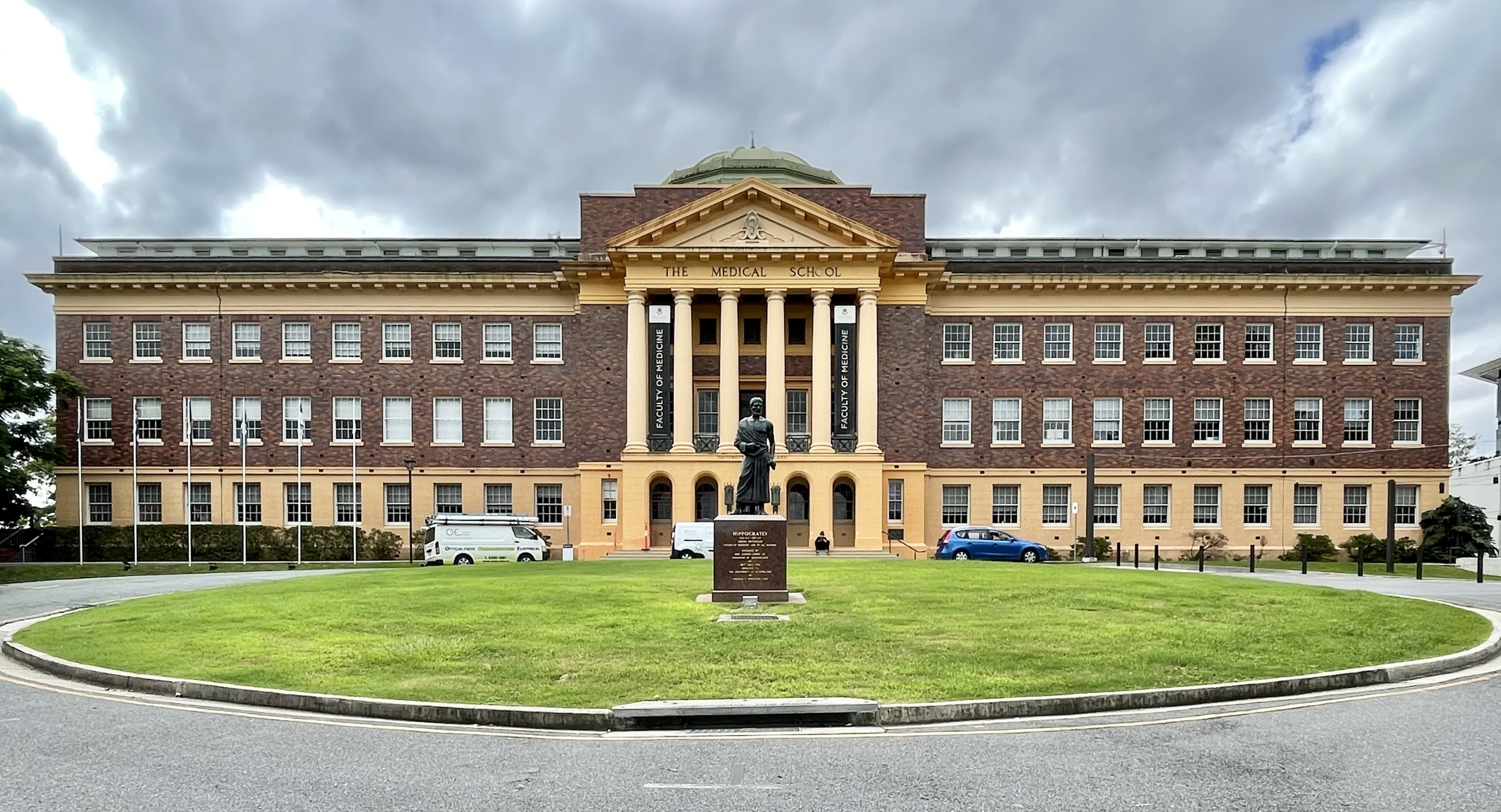
- Mayne Medical School

- Location within Queensland Location within Australia
- 27.4487°S 153.0239°E
- Location: 288 Herston Road, Herston, City of Brisbane, Queensland, Australia

History
- Design period: 1919–1930s (interwar period)
- Built: 1938–1939
- Built for: University of Queensland

Site notes
- Architect: Raymond Clare Nowland
- Architectural style: Classicism
- Owner: University of Queensland

Queensland Heritage Register
- Official name: University of Queensland Medical School, Mayne Medical School
- Type: state heritage (landscape, built)
- Designated: 24 June 1999
- Reference no.: 601167
- Significant period: 1930s (historical); 1930s (fabric); 1930s ongoing (social)
- Significant components: views to, school/school room, fence/wall – perimeter, views from, dome, garden/grounds

University of Queensland Mayne Medical School is a heritage-listed university building at 288 Herston Road, Herston, City of Brisbane, Queensland, Australia. It was designed by Raymond Clare Nowland and built from 1938 to 1939. It is also known as University of Queensland Medical School. It was added to the Queensland Heritage Register on 24 June 1999.

The Marks-Hirschfeld Museum of Medical History is located within the building. Operated by volunteers, it has a collection of over 7,000 items of medical memorabilia, medical and surgical instruments. The focus is on the study of medical history in Queensland, but the collection includes items with broader significance to both Australia and internationally.

== History ==
A monumental, three-storey, red face brick building in a Renaissance idiom occupying a ridge adjacent to the Royal Brisbane Hospital and overlooking Victoria Park at Herston, the Mayne Medical School was opened by the Premier of Queensland, Hon. William Forgan Smith, on 11 August 1939.

The establishment of the Mayne Medical School was a significant moment for the State of Queensland and for the medical profession.

There were earnest attempts to form a medical school for Queensland over many decades. During the 1870s and 1880s medical personnel from the Brisbane Hospital and the British Medical Association in Queensland advocated the establishment of a medical school. In 1893 the President of the Queensland Medical Society renewed calls for the establishment of a university and a faculty of medicine. In 1913, in the early days of the newly formed University of Queensland, there were further pleas for a medical school.

In 1935, the Forgan Smith Government appointed a committee to investigate proposals to create a Faculty of Medicine within the University. When the Faculty of Medicine was established, the Government agreed to fund the building of a medical school despite the committee recommendation that makeshift provisions for accommodation were to be preferred to further delay in its establishment: "...the Government, after due consideration, decided to provide buildings worthy of the new venture". Recognised as the founders of the Faculty of Medicine, Ernest Sandford Jackson, Ernest James Goddard, James Vincent Duhig and Errol Solomon Meyers were instrumental in convincing the Government to fund the construction of the Medical School.

Meyers was an ardent campaigner for the establishment of a Medical School for Queensland and was actively involved in medical education throughout his professional life. He initiated the first postgraduate courses for medicine in Queensland, was instrumental in the formation of an Anatomy School, became the first licensed anatomist in Queensland, was actively engaged in the establishment of the Faculty of Dentistry at the University of Queensland and was member of the first Faculty of Dentistry. Meyers, second Dean of the Faculty of Medicine from 1942 to 1955, presided over an era of significant change and in this founding role is recognised for his major contribution to the establishment and development of medical education in Queensland. The galleried lecture theatre in the Medical School has been named the ES Meyers Lecture Theatre in his honour.

The importance of medical research, particularly into tropical medicine, was a significant impetus for the establishment of the Medical School. Work undertaken by Dr Raphael Cilento on leptospiral disease among cane cutters had a significant impact on Premier Forgan Smith and was instrumental in convincing him of the need for Queensland to train its own doctors and provide specialist training in tropical medicine. Professor Ernest James Goddard, Professor of Biology in the University of Queensland, had a professional interest in tropical biology and campaigned for research and training in tropical health and urged the establishment of faculties in Medicine and Veterinary Science to facilitate such work.

The Forgan Smith Government was a major force in the expansion of the University and the construction of the Medical School was part of the building program initiated by the Government within the overall development of the University of Queensland. Forgan Smith demonstrated a particular interest in the establishment of a Medical School, recognising its importance for the practice of medicine in the State and as a prestigious project within his Government's building program. Together with the provision of hospitals and maternity clinics; dental clinics and the Dental Hospital and College; the Medical School was part of the Government's commitment to providing universal health care to Queensland. The importance to the Government of the establishment of the Medical School is clear in this comment by Ned Hanlon, Minister for Health and Home Affairs, at the commencement of construction: "Queensland had a wonderful future... For a community, the building up of a university and a faculty (of Medicine) were of supreme importance... the Government could be proud that they had brought a complete university into practical politics...". Mr Hanlon said the building (Medical School) would be well in keeping with the purpose for which it was being erected. It would not only be adequate, but would be of a dignified character.

Comment about the Medical School included as a feature of architectural dignity and importance of the new Medical School, erected by the State Public Works Department, provides an interesting study to all those interested in the development of Brisbane.

The Medical School was constructed during an intensive public works building program undertaken by the Forgan Smith Labor Government in Queensland during the 1930s to counter the effects of the Great Depression. Design responsibility for the Medical School was assigned to Raymond Clare Nowland, an architect in the Department of Public Works (DPW). Raymond Clare Nowland joined the architectural office of the DPW in November 1932 where he became a senior architect in 1938. He produced the most significant buildings of his career between 1932 and 1942 including the University of Queensland Medical School, Herston (1939); Brisbane Dental Hospital and College (1941); Police Barracks, Petrie Terrace (1942); Cairns Court House Complex (1945); Rockhampton Court and Administrative Complex; Toowoomba Police Station Complex; and Maryborough Government Offices Building.

This design for the Medical School was developed after extensive consultation with members of the Faculty of Medicine and research into the design and operation of medical schools and colleges in America. The design was based on the model for medical education advocated by the Rockefeller Foundation which emphasised laboratory training in the basic medical sciences and use of hospitals for clinical training. The planning of the Medical School, with its specialist laboratories and proximity to the General Hospital, reflects this approach.

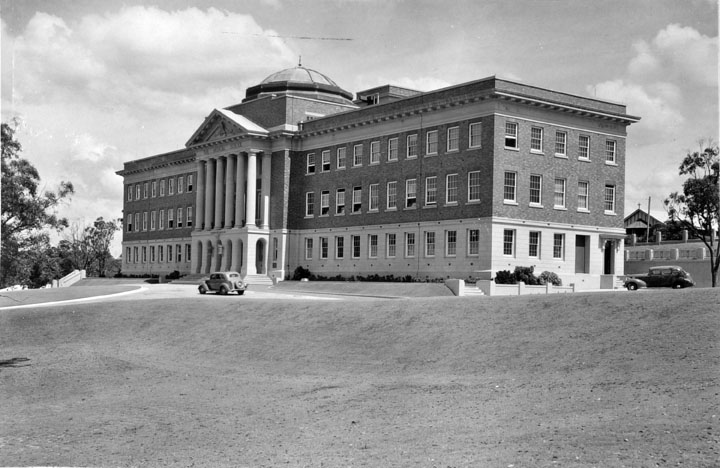
Mayne Medical School, 1941

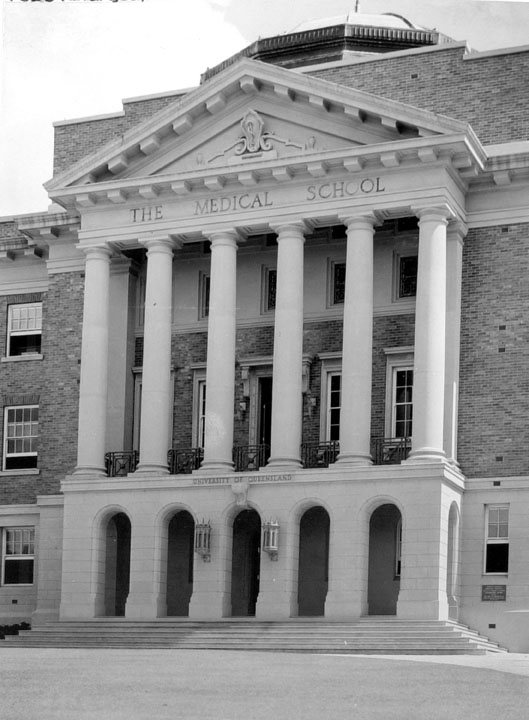
The entrance, 1941

The first sketch plans for the proposed Medical School were prepared by Nowland in February 1936. A modest, three-storey, brick and concrete building "in an adaption of the Romanesque style" accommodating teaching spaces for an envisioned 150 students was sited on the northern part of the site adjacent to the Brisbane General Hospital with the main entrance to Weightman Street. This design was rejected by the Faculty of Medicine who suggested that "a simple Greek front with double columns on either side of the main entrance porch would give the building a more dignified and characteristic appearance and would look better and more striking from a distance". New sketch plans were prepared for a much larger scheme "for a three-storey building of brick, concrete and steel structure with flat roofs in the Renaissance Style" again to the rear of the site but with the main entrance to Herston Road. The School was constructed to this design except that the lantern roof was replaced with a dome. The building has been planned to accommodate further wings to each end.

When the building opened the ground floor contained: the main hall; main office; various laboratories and associated facilities including a mortuary. The library, laboratories, lecture rooms, associated offices and equipment rooms occupied the first floor. The second floor accommodated the main galleried lecture theatre, museum, two laboratories and associated support rooms. An animal house stood on the flat roof to the west. Consideration had been given to the provision of services and use of suitable materials to facilitate the effective operation of the building. All windows except those on the south-east were glazed with anti-actinic glass of a soft bluish-green to counteract the glare and reduce heat transmission. Other services and fittings included sound-proofing, ventilating systems, refrigeration, stainless steel and chromium-plated fittings, and specialised electrical and drainage systems. A double wall running the length of the building to the rear corridor houses horizontal and vertical service ducts. Furniture and fittings throughout the building are of Queensland timbers and were constructed in the Government's Ipswich Road Workshop.

There is decorative work throughout the public spaces including stained timber panelling and decorative carved timber work to the entrance lobbies and hall, decorative plaster work to walls and ceilings, leadlight and cut glass work to doors and fanlights.

Since 1939, medical students at the University of Queensland have passed beneath the decorative elliptical arch between main entrance hall and the rear corridor which bears the inscription articulating the philosophy upon which the School was established "cum pietate et sanctitate hanc artem meam profitebor" freely translated as "May all members of the general community profit by the art and skill of those who learn, with deference and respect, their profession in this place."

The building has been altered including refurbishment of the galleried lecture theatre, library, some offices and laboratory areas and the roof accommodation. An annexe has been constructed to the east with a direct connecting link to the Medical School and a research and teaching facility has been erected to the west separated from the School building by an open walkway. The exterior of the building is substantially intact. The alterations have diminished the interiors and distorted some internal spatial relationships but much original internal fabric remains including the main entrance hall and main office, the rear entrance porch and telephone booth, terrazzo flooring throughout the building including fine examples of terrazzo in the entrances, panelling, joinery including doors and windows, shelving, furniture, anti-actinic glazing to the windows and leadlight and cut glass decorative glazing to doors and fanlights.

The Medical School has been associated with the training of medical graduates from the University of Queensland since 1939 and is recognised for its achievements in teaching, service and research. The School has exerted a significant influence on the teaching hospitals in Queensland and research groups associated with the School continue to make major contributions to medical science.

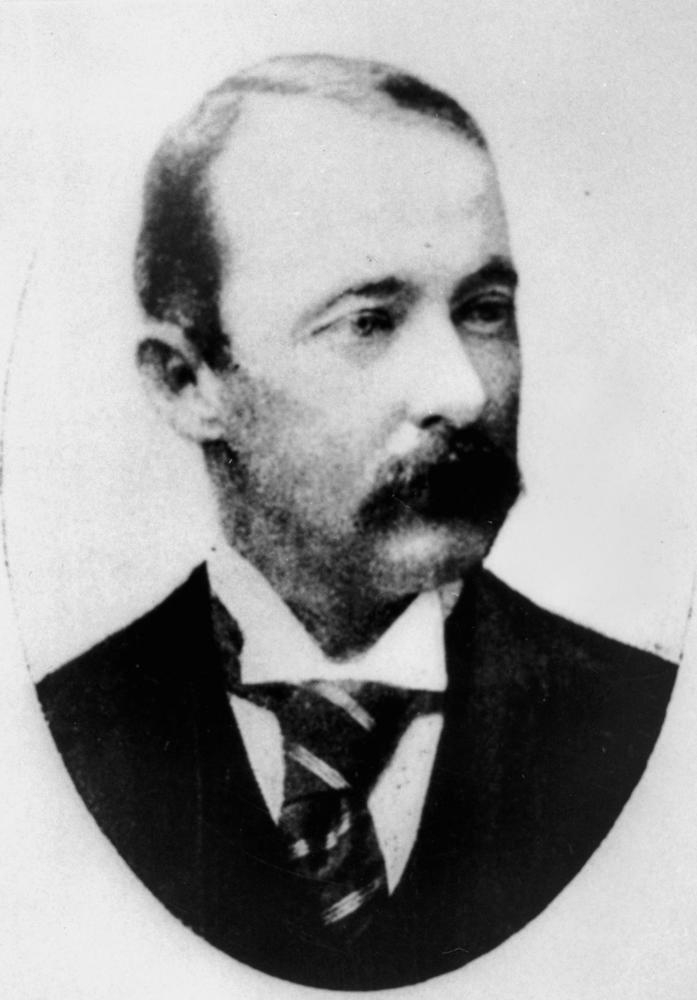
Dr James Mayne

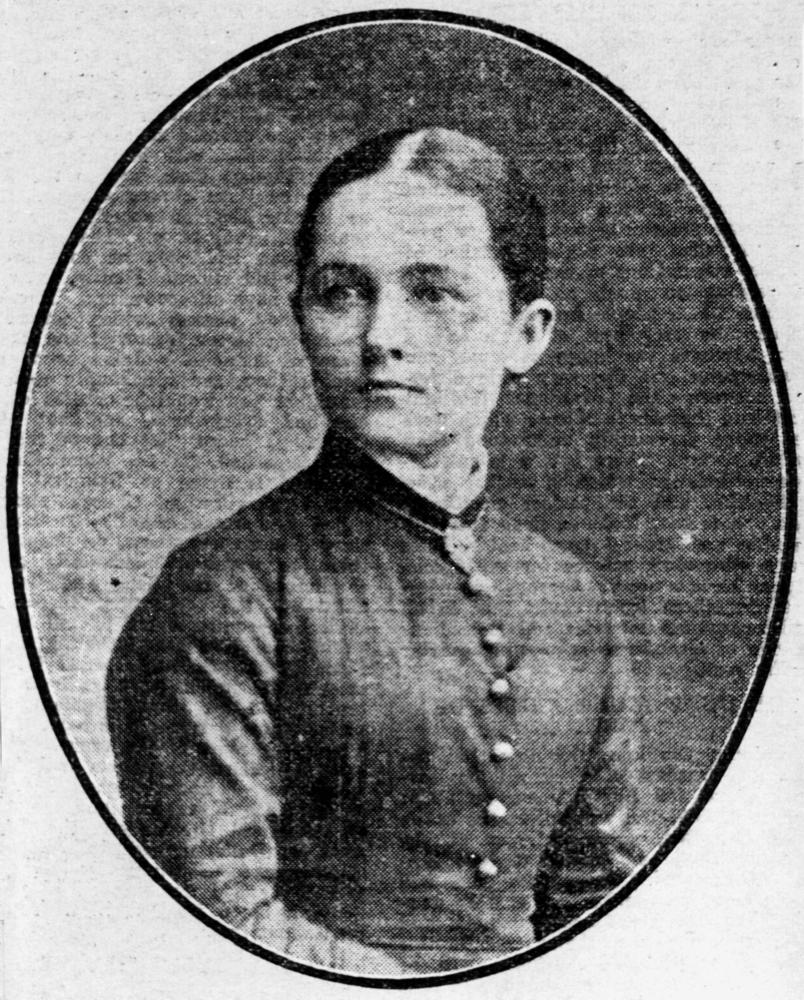
Emelia Mayne

On the deaths of brother and sister Dr James O'Neil Mayne (1939) and Mary Emelia Mayne (1940), their substantial estates were bequeathed to the Medical School. The name Mayne Medical School is a recognition of these bequests which continue to fund the medical school to this day through assets such as the Brisbane Arcade.

== Description ==
Opened in 1939, the University of Queensland Medical School is an three-storey, red facebrick building in a Renaissance style placed on the northern ridge of a sloping triangular-shaped site of over six acres in Herston Road, Brisbane adjacent to the western boundary of the Royal Brisbane Hospital.

Approached by a steep driveway from Herston Road, a wide sweep of concrete stairs arrives at the main pedimented, temple-front portico entrance containing six giant order columns in a Doric order sitting on a rusticated base of arches framing the porch entrance. Two large decorative bronze lamps flank the central arch entrance to the portico which is marked by a large scroll keystone lettered above with the words "University of Queensland". A single range, the building is symmetrical about this entrance and rests on a rendered rusticated base, has regular bays of plain, flat-arched sash windows with rendered sills to each level and an entablature containing large mutules over a plain frieze containing the lettering "The Medical School". The tympanum contains a carved stone shield. A solid parapet above the cornice screens the accommodation on the flat roofs.

The rear elevation is symmetrical about a projecting broken pedimented entrance dominated by the lift tower which is emphasised by relieved rendered quoining. A small flight of concrete steps flanked by freestanding decorative wrought iron lamps arrives at the entrance porch which is sheltered by a moulded concrete awning supported by large console brackets. Repetitive rhythmic detailing of flat arched timber sash windows to this elevation gives it a stark presence to the street. The elevation is disrupted by the later flights of open metal fire stairs to the east and west ends.

The building is crowned with a 12-segment copper roofed dome over the central portico entrance block. The former flat roof to the east now accommodates offices, additional office and research accommodation has been erected to the west flat roof and both areas are now roofed with copper sheeted low pitched gable roofs.

Two open light wells to each side of the central entrance block ventilate and light adjacent offices, the ground floor toilet areas and the rear corridor.

The building is organised by a single-loaded corridor to the rear, the main rooms are entered from the organising corridor and subsidiary rooms are accessed from transverse passages. The vertical rises are on axis with the main entrance.

The concrete landing of the portico entrance opens through a set of double timber panelled doors into a small lobby which opens into the main entrance hall. A doorbell button is located to the left of the lobby entrance doors within the portico. The lobby is decorated with carved timber work to the panelled door surrounds, has a decorative cut glass fanlight to the main timber panelled doors and rosette pateras to the each side of the fanlight. The floors to the lobby and entrance hall are finished with red, green and yellow terrazzo in geometric patterns and the walls are panelled with stained timber to picture rail height. A decorative elliptical arch marks the junction of the hall and the rear corridor. The inscription within the moulded plaster architrave reads "CUM PIETATE ET SANCTITATE HANC ARTEM MEAM PROFITEBOR". The ceiling is decorated with a plaster relief border of tied straight twigs.

The central stairwell weaves around the lift well and has terrazzo treads and landings and features a grooved silky oak handrail with scrolled ends. The original lift is encased within a decorative lattice metal cage and retains its original interior. The lift operator lever mechanism within the lift chamber has been dismantled.

The rear entrance lobby has a fine terrazzo floor in red, green and yellow, has stained timber wall panelling and features a timber and glass public telephone booth to the southwest corner.

The toilets to the ground and second floors retain fine terrazzo flooring and privacy screens.

Original terrazzo sills to former ground floor laboratory areas remain. The large timber sash windows to the perimeter of the building have generous timber sills to the interiors and provide substantial light to offices, laboratories and the rear corridor. Windows to the corridor and east and west elevation retain much of the original blue-green tinted anti-actinic glazing.

The committee room to the southwest corner of the second floor retains original timber panelling and is now an office.

The library on the first floor has been altered and is now a meeting room with adjacent offices and catering area. This area opens onto the southern balcony, which affords sweeping views across Victoria Park, Victoria Park Golf Course, Queensland University of Technology Kelvin Grove Campus and over towards Gregory Terrace and beyond to Mt Coot-tha. Shelving and display cupboards from the ground floor have been relocated to the former library. The doors to the balcony have a shallow external awning supported by decorative consoles and are flanked by bronze torch globe lamps. The balcony is defined by the giant order columns separated by decorative wrought iron balustrading. Both sets of doors to the former library have decorative leadlight glazing panels and fanlights.

The first floor laboratory remains in use as a teaching laboratory and retains original display and storage cupboards. The benches have been altered and the internal space diminished by the insertion of a false ceiling and servicing.

The original double wall containing service ducts and wiring with sliding access door to the top remains to each floor.

The main driveway from Herston Road is flanked by grassed and tree planted slopes to each side, which provide shade for hospital visitors, students, and School and Hospital personnel. A fence of solid shaped concrete piers with decorative wrought iron balustrading runs along the boundary to Weightman Street with sets of decorative wrought iron gates to the pedestrian entrance on the upper terrace and the garage entrance at the lower end. The grounds to the rear of the building are formed into two lawn terraces separated by a substantial retaining wall with a flight of concrete stairs. There are clipped lawns and round garden beds planted with roses to the upper terrace and a number of shade trees to each terrace. Planted edge gardens flank the path from Weightman Street to the rear entrance. A laneway at basement level provides access to the ground floor motor room.

== Heritage listing ==
University of Queensland Medical School was listed on the Queensland Heritage Register on 24 June 1999 having satisfied the Queensland Heritage Register's criteria.

== See also ==
- Category:University of Queensland Mayne Medical School alumni
