= Gladstone Court House =

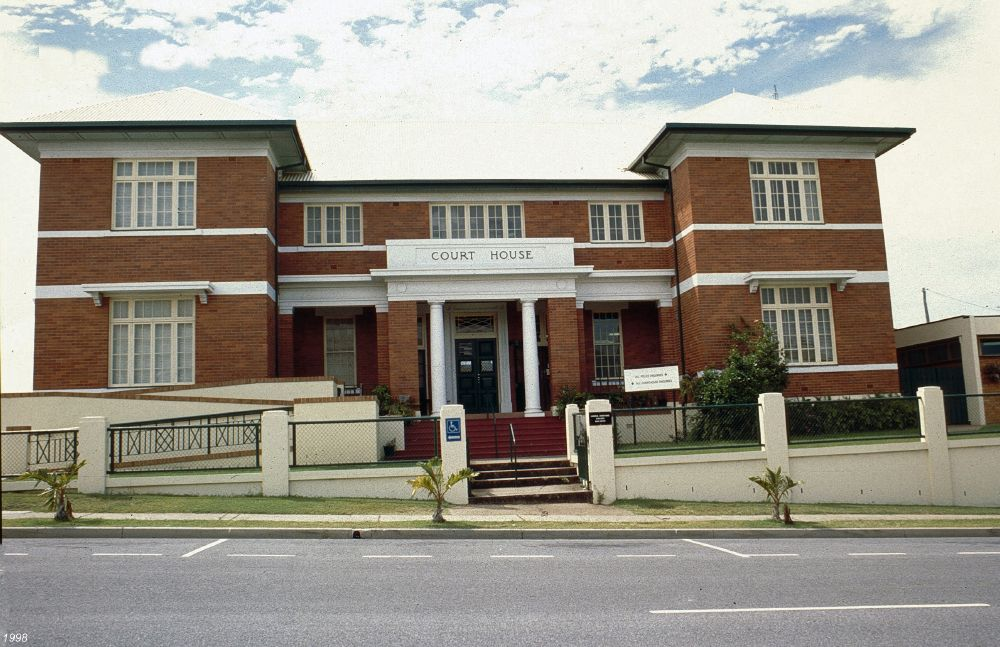
- Gladstone Court House, 1998

- Location within Queensland Location within Australia
- 23.8395°S 151.2549°E
- Location: 16 Yarroon Street, Gladstone, Gladstone Region, Queensland, Australia

History
- Design period: 1939–1945 (World War II)
- Built: 1940–1942

Site notes
- Architect: Raymond Clare Nowland
- Architectural style: Classicism

Queensland Heritage Register
- Official name: Gladstone Court House
- Type: state heritage (built)
- Designated: 29 May 1998
- Reference no.: 601332
- Significant period: 1940s (historical); 1940s (fabric); 1942–ongoing (social)
- Significant components: court house, office/s

Gladstone Court House is a heritage-listed courthouse at 16 Yarroon Street, Gladstone, Gladstone Region, Queensland, Australia. It was designed by Raymond Claire Nowland and built from 1940 to 1942. It was added to the Queensland Heritage Register on 29 May 1998.

== History ==
Gladstone Court House, a two-storeyed masonry building, was erected in 1940–42. The building was designed in the office of the Queensland Department of Public Works, and replaced an 1873–1874 courthouse and lands office. The 1940s building was at least the third purpose-designed courthouse in Gladstone.

Gladstone was established by the New South Wales government in 1853–1854, possibly in an attempt to create a more centralised alternative to Brisbane as the capital of any future northern colony. When Captain Maurice Charles O'Connell, first Government Resident and Police Magistrate of the Port Curtis District, arrived in March 1854, the township of Gladstone had been laid out near Auckland Inlet, and the first slab buildings had been erected. O'Connell and his family set up residence (initially in tents) at Barney Point, a couple of miles south of Auckland Inlet, and around The Residency there soon developed a small residential settlement.

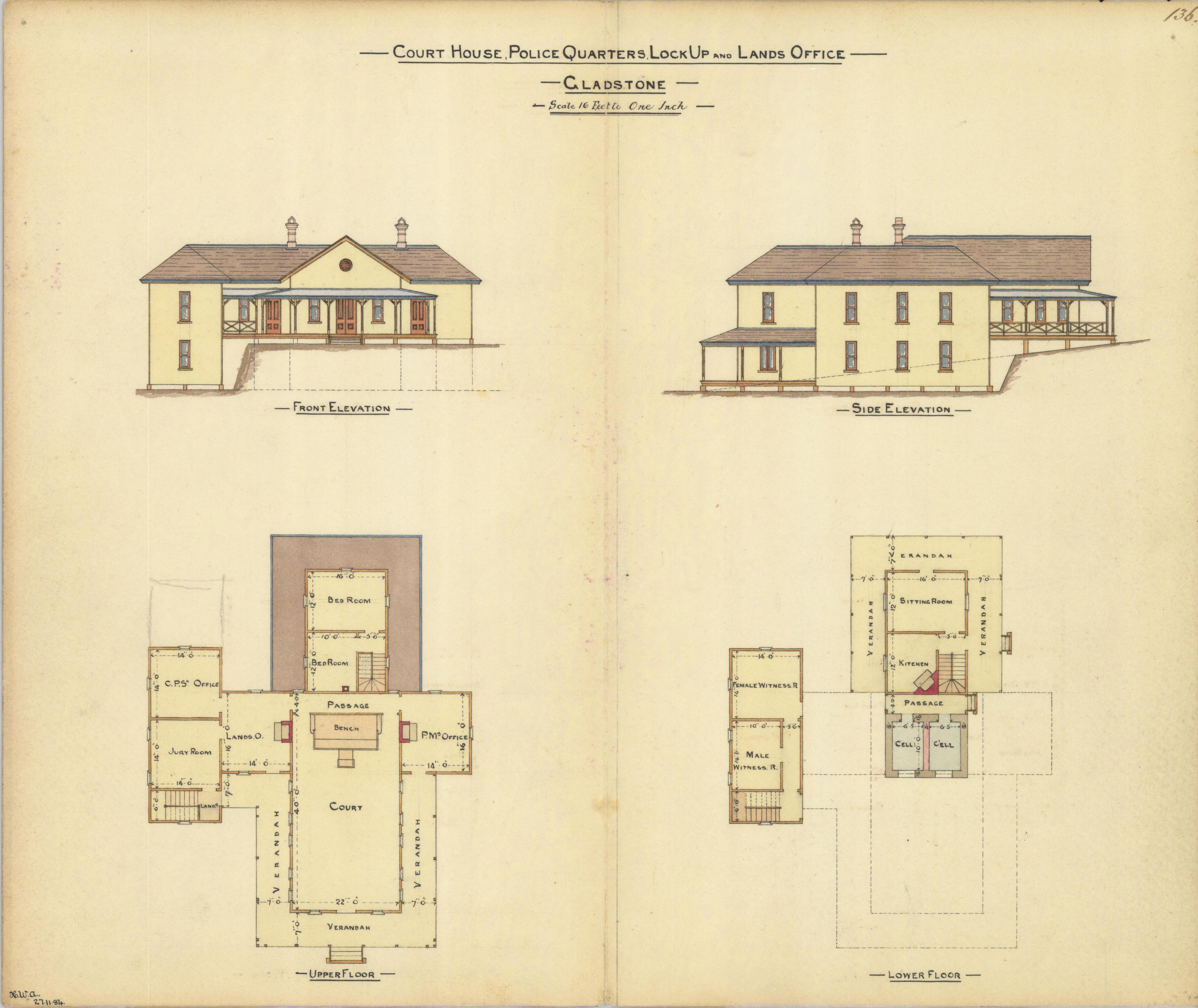
Architectural drawing of the 1870s Court House

O'Connell first conducted court matters from his tent office at Barney Point. Within a few months he had acquired a slab and shingled building on the rise of Auckland Hill - illegally erected by storekeeper Richard Palmer on a crown reserve, prior to O'Connell's arrival - as Gladstone's first court house and public building. About 1860 this building appears to have been replaced with a purpose-designed court house and watch house. This in turn was demolished in 1873–1874 and replaced with a two-storeyed timber building, which accommodated both the courthouse and the lands office. The 1873–1874 building was situated on the present court house reserve, but at the northern end of the block, overlooking Auckland Inlet, and was accessed via a lane from Auckland Street. The building was extended in 1882–1883, and served as the Gladstone Court House until the early 1940s, when it was replaced with a two-storeyed brick building.

Site preparation for the brick building, which was to face Yarroon Street and the town rather than the harbour, was carried out in the second half of 1940, and plans for the new Courthouse were prepared by the Queensland Department of Public Works in late 1940 and early 1941. A plan dated December 1940 showing front and rear elevations and ground and first floor plans, was drawn by architect Thomas Robert Gladwin, who had been employed as assistant architect in the architectural office of the Public Works Department since 1924. The design of the building is attributed to Raymond Clare Nowland who was also the designer of Stanthorpe Courthouse (1941) and Charleville Courthouse (1945). All three courthouses are similar in planning, elevational treatment, materials and detailing. These were two-storeyed masonry buildings in stripped-classical style, H-shaped in plan, generally incorporating the courtroom on the upper floor, and government public offices on the ground floor.

The new Gladstone Court House was completed in late 1942, at a cost of nearly £16,000. Like the Mackay Courthouse and Charleville court house, it was a combined court house/public offices, providing court facilities (court room, offices for the Judge, police magistrate/warden and police, and rooms for the jury, witnesses and solicitor) as well as offices for the land ranger, forestry officer, stock and dairy inspectors and mining registrar.

Alterations to the fabric of the building have been fairly minimal. Between 1966 and 1972, a single-storeyed brick extension, containing staffroom and toilets, was erected at the rear of the building. Some minor internal refurbishment has been undertaken. The former police office on the ground floor has been converted to a small courtroom, but it is unclear at what date - possibly the mid-1970s. This does not appear to have involved the removal of any partition walls. In the early 1980s, a suspended acoustic ceiling was installed in the courtroom and a new judge's toilet was provided.

== Description ==
Prominently situated on Auckland Hill with the main entrance addressing Yarroon Street, the Gladstone Court House is a two-storeyed brick building with a hipped corrugated iron roof. Designed in a stripped classical style, the red face brickwork contrasts with rendered string courses at floor and window levels. A rendered masonry fence appears to have been designed with the building.

The building is H-shaped in plan with the main entrance centrally positioned. A flight of stairs leads to a verandah and portico with two Doric columns supporting an entablature with "COURT HOUSE" in raised lettering. The entrance doorway contains a two-leafed, eight-panelled door with fanlight and architrave. On the southern section of the main elevation a masonry ramp gives access to the verandah. All the windows throughout the building are timber framed with either six or twelve panes. At the rear of the building a single-storeyed extension encloses the space between the wings of the building.

Internally the ground floor contains a central corridor with a large general office on the right hand side and a Magistrate's Court on the left-hand side. The space occupied by the Magistrate's Court was previously an office. An enclosed verandah at the rear of the building gives access to two staircases and the extension which is a lunchroom. On the upper level the main courtroom occupies the cross section of the H with the other two wings containing offices. The courtroom contains all the original court room furniture and has a suspended ceiling with modern light fittings, air conditioning and fans. The purpose-built silky oak courtroom furniture includes a judges' bench, witness dock, public gallery, jury benches, tables, benches and chairs. The furniture is sombre and plain with decorative battened panels to the front of the judges' bench, sides of jury benches, chair backs and other associated small benches/tables.

The design and detailing of the building is robust and both internally and externally it remains intact. It retains most of its original fixtures and finishes including joinery, hardware, plaster ceilings, timber floors and concrete passageways and staircases.

== Heritage listing ==
Gladstone Court House was listed on the Queensland Heritage Register on 29 May 1998 having satisfied the following criteria.

The place is important in demonstrating the evolution or pattern of Queensland's history.

Gladstone Court House, erected in the early 1940s, is important in illustrating the pattern of development of Gladstone as a regional centre. As one of a group of employment-generating public buildings erected in Gladstone during the interwar period, [including the 1929 Commonwealth Bank Building, the 1932 Post Office and the 1934 Town Council Chambers], the court house is significant in illustrating a more positive impact of the interwar economic depression on regional Queensland.

The place is important in demonstrating the principal characteristics of a particular class of cultural places.

The two-storeyed brick courthouse remains substantially intact, and is a good example of interwar Queensland public works design. The courtroom is important for its collection of intact purpose-built furniture.

The place is important because of its aesthetic significance.

Prominently positioned on the rise of Auckland Hill, Gladstone Court House remains an integral component of the Gladstone townscape, and has landmark status.

The place has a strong or special association with a particular community or cultural group for social, cultural or spiritual reasons.

As a group, these buildings contributed significantly to the development of a 20th-century image for Gladstone, and remain important public landmarks.

The place has a special association with the life or work of a particular person, group or organisation of importance in Queensland's history.

The building is important for its association with the Department of Public Works and in particular with the work of architect Raymond Clare Nowland. The court house, and the reserve on which it is located, is significant for its strong association with the dispensing of justice in the Port Curtis District since at least the 1870s.
