= Cairns Court House Complex =

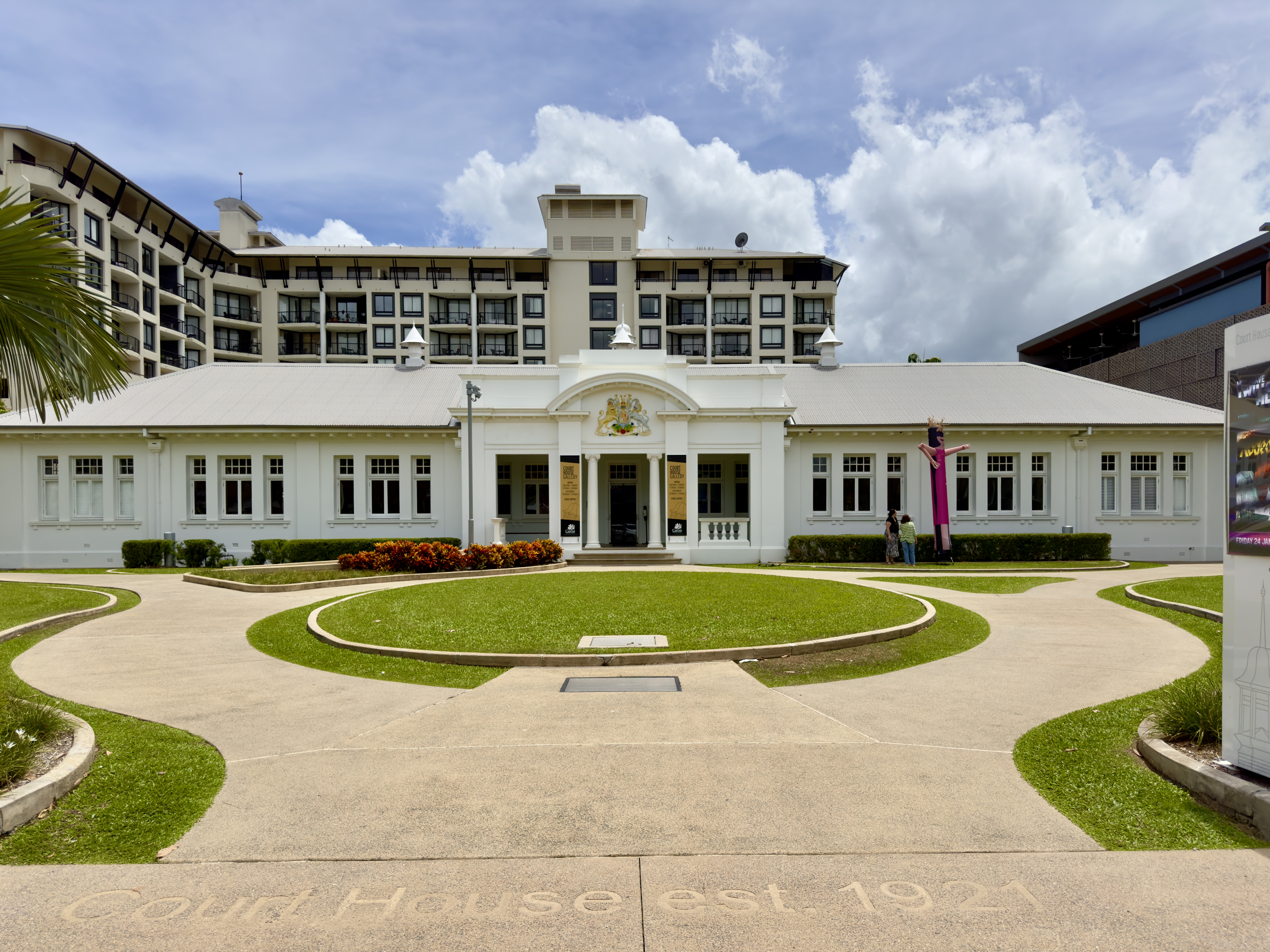
- Cairns Court House, 2025

- Location within Queensland Location within Australia
- 16.9213°S 145.7777°E
- Location: 38 Abbott Street, Cairns City, Cairns, Cairns Region, Queensland, Australia

History
- Design period: 1914–1919 (World War I)
- Built: 1919–1921

Queensland Heritage Register
- Official name: Cairns Court House Complex, Cairns Court House and Art Gallery (former Public Offices)
- Type: state heritage (built, landscape)
- Designated: 21 October 1992
- Reference no.: 600376
- Significant period: 1910s (historical courthouse); 1930s (historical govt offices); 1919–1920s (courthouse fabric)
- Significant components: office/s, garden – bed/s, courthouse

Cairns Court House Complex is a heritage-listed site incorporating a former courthouse and a former public administration building (now an art gallery) at 38–40 Abbott Street, Cairns City, Cairns, Cairns Region, Queensland, Australia. It was built from 1919 to 1921. It was added to the Queensland Heritage Register on 21 October 1992 and is a significant cultural tourism destination in Far North Queensland.

== Cairns Court House Gallery ==
The building is now home to the Court House Gallery. Opened in 2020, the Gallery features exhibitions of historical and contemporary art by regional, national and international artists. Its artistic program is managed by Cairns Art Gallery.

== History ==
The former Cairns Court House (erected 1919–21) and the Cairns Art Gallery (former Cairns Public Offices, erected 1934–1936) are located on a 2-acre site reserved since 1876 for police purposes. Both buildings were erected during the years between the First and Second World Wars, the third major phase of Cairns' development, at which time the city's status as the principal port of Far North Queensland was consolidated, and the city centre virtually re-built. Both are substantial masonry buildings, whose construction reflected Queensland Government confidence in the growth of Cairns as an important regional centre during the interwar period.

Cairns was established officially in October 1876, as a port to service the newly discovered Hodgkinson goldfields. In this first phase of Cairns' development, there was a small flurry of building activity (mostly shanties and tent houses), but the town competed with both Cooktown and Port Douglas for the Hodgkinson trade, and made little progress until the establishment of a local sugar industry and the opening up of the Atherton Tablelands' mineral fields, in the early 1880s. The 1885 announcement that Cairns was to be the terminus for the Herberton railway established the town as the principal port in the region. These boosts to the local economy in the 1880s generated a second building and development phase, during which the early temporary structures were replaced by more substantial timber buildings.

Whilst a number of masonry commercial buildings were erected in Cairns in the years immediately preceding the First World War, the third major phase of Cairns' development was during the 1920s and 1930s. The Cairns hinterland Soldier Settlement Schemes of the 1920s, the completion of the North Coast rail link to Brisbane in 1924, the extensive re-building necessitated by a spate of cyclones in the 1920s, and the poor condition of earlier timber structures, combined to produce unprecedented building activity in Cairns. The city centre in particular is dominated by masonry structures of the 1920s and 1930s, and in this respect is markedly different from other Queensland towns and cities. Reinforced concrete was the preferred building material, but the Queensland Government chose to erect the important Public Offices in brick.

=== Courthouse ===
The 1919–21 building was the third courthouse erected in Cairns. An 1878 marine survey of Cairns harbour indicates that the first courthouse was located on the customs reserve, and may have shared the same premises as the first customs house. This probably was the temporary courthouse erected by the Works Department in Cairns in December 1877.

The "temporary" courthouse remained in use for several years, but was replaced during the second phase of Cairns' development. In 1883 the Works Department prepared plans for a more substantial timber courthouse, which was erected in 1884 on the Esplanade, but facing Abbott Street, on the police reserve. At the time, it was considered to be very fine, the best erected building in Cairns, both in so far as appearance and design as well as in construction. By 1890, however, the local court had outgrown its courthouse, and the building was in a state of disrepair. Despite repeated comment from public and judicial circles alike that the courthouse at Cairns was the worst on the circuit, it was not replaced until the present building was completed late in 1921.

In 1917, Alfred Barton Brady, Queensland Government Architect and Under Secretary for Public Works, finally acknowledged that the Cairns Court House was beyond renovation and that a new building was necessary. Plans were prepared in the government architect's office in 1918, working drawings were completed by January 1919, tenders for the supply of materials were called early in 1919, and construction was commenced in May that year. As a post-First World War initiative by the state government to create employment for returned servicemen, the new courthouse at Cairns was constructed using day labour, under the supervision of the District Foreman of Works, EJ Oakley. The construction period stretched over two and a half years, with the Cairns community attributing the slow progress of the building to the use of day labour.

Some of the joinery was made in government workshops in Brisbane and shipped to Cairns, but the remainder of the timber used in the construction was secured from the Cairns hinterland. Particularly impressive were the silky oak fittings in the court room. The roof was of fibrous-cement tiles with terracotta ridge capping. This roof was replaced with corrugated fibrous-cement roof sheeting in 1953, at which time the roof ventilators were removed.

By November 1921 the new courthouse, which had cost over £13,500, was completed, and the court room was used for the first time on 17 January 1922. From this first sitting, it was evident that although the room was well ventilated, the acoustics were poor due to the height of the ceiling. Not until 1959 was the problem rectified, with a false acoustic ceiling fixed to the existing beams.

In 1926, the city's sesqui-centenary year, the Cairns Chamber of Commerce requested that the Queensland Government improve the Court House grounds. In January 1927, the Cairns City Council agreed that their gardener at Edge Hill would lay out the grounds, to include concrete kerbing around the oval in the centre, and garden tile edging. Government approval for funding the project was granted in January 1928, and the gardens were completed by early 1929. Concrete paths were laid in the grounds in 1946, and in 1949/50 the grounds were replanted.

In 1968, the building was extended at a cost of approximately $53,000, with the extensions rendered to match the existing facades, and the roof re-clad with corrugated iron sheeting. The remodelling created a second court room and a magistrate's court.

In 1992, the building was vacated when a new courthouse and police station complex opened in Sheridan Street, and remained unused until it was renovated as the Cairns Courthouse Hotel in 1998.

=== Former Public Offices (Art Gallery) ===
In 1929, the State Government Insurance Office (SGIO) requested that part of the Police Reserve at the corner of Shields and Abbott Streets, Cairns, be made available for the erection of a new SGIO office. In 1930, the Queensland Government Tourist Bureau submitted an identical request. In February 1933, the Public Service Commissioner reported on the requirements for an office building on the site, which would necessitate the re-location of the Senior Sergeant's Residence and the Tracker's Hut. In the same month, Cabinet approved that the Works Department erect an office building for and at the expense of the SGIO, and sketch plans were completed in April that year. By September 1933, however, the Public Service Commissioner had decided that the government would erect the building with general funding, and rent offices to various government departments.

Construction commenced in 1934, with the plans attributed to architect Raymond Clare Nowland of the government architect's office. The new Public Curator's Building was constructed mainly of hinterland materials, with bricks from Mareeba and joinery from Johnston's Stratford Sawmill. The principal offices and public spaces were wall-panelled and floored with local figured timbers as a promotion for North Queensland timber products. However, the leadlights were supplied by a Brisbane company, and the roof was clad originally with fibrous cement tiles supplied by Hardie & Co.

The new Public Curator's Building occupied a prominent position at the intersection of Abbott and Shields Streets, which contained the conspicuous Cairns War Memorial. The building was designed to address both the adjacent courthouse and the newly established formal courthouse gardens, and the classical detailing of the facades re-affirmed the power and presence of government in the community. The building also was designed to be extended along Shields Street, with a repeat of the portico on the western end, but this planned extension was never undertaken.

The new Public Offices were completed by late March 1936, and were opened officially in July that year. They had cost nearly £31,000. The principal ground floor tenant was the SGIO, with the Government Tourist Bureau occupying an office with display windows at the front. Other ground floor tenants included the Land Commission, Agricultural Bank, and Forestry officers. The principal occupant of the first floor was the Public Curator, along with the District Foreman of Works, Inspectors of Weights and Measures, Health, Slaughter Houses, Fruits and Diseases in Plants, and visiting tax inspectors and parliamentarians.

Late in 1936, the grounds around the new Public Offices were laid out, with concrete kerbing to match that in the courthouse gardens, and the lawn extended to the new building.

In the mid-1950s the Government Tourist Bureau and the Department of Agriculture and Stock vacated the building, and the Works Department re-located some offices there in 1957. The SGIO vacated the building in 1969, following which the Public Curator's Office moved to the ground floor, and the Valuer General's Office occupied the whole of the first floor. In mid-1980, the Public Curator's Office vacated the building, following which the interior was remodelled, and the ground floor occupied principally by offices of the Magistrate's Courts. In 1992/93 the building was converted for use as the Cairns City Council's Fine Arts Gallery, now the Cairns Art Gallery.

The refurbishment as Cairns Regional Gallery (now Cairns Art Gallery) was designed by Total Project Group architects and was made possible after the Cairns community raised over $2 million towards the building's conversion into a public art gallery. The gallery was officially opened in 1995 by renowned local artist Ray Crooke.

Since opening the Cairns Regional Gallery built a significant national reputation for innovative programming which included curating Ilan Pasin (This is Our Way): Torres Strait Art, the first major exhibition of contemporary and historical art from the Torres Strait Islands in 1998. Its art collection includes significant works by artists from around Far North Queensland, with significant holdings by Aboriginal and Torres Strait Islander artists from Cape York communities.

== Description ==
This complex, consisting of the Court House, Art Gallery and Abbott Street gardens, is located on the eastern corner of Abbott and Shields Streets within the Cairns central business district. The entire complex is now managed by Cairns Art Gallery as a cultural precinct which includes the nearby Mulgrave Shire Council Chambers.

=== Court House ===
The Court House is a single-storeyed rendered masonry building, with a hipped corrugated iron roof, fronting the Abbott Street gardens to the southwest. The building is T-shaped in plan, with offices and subsidiary court rooms forming the western wing and the main court room forming the eastern wing. The central entrance of the western wing has a recessed porch with a slightly projecting facade surmounted by a stepped parapet with a curved pediment, cornice and a lion and unicorn crest. This is supported by two columns flanked by pilasters and a section of concrete balustrade to either side. The southwest facade comprises a series of triple window units separated by pilasters with an expressed base, jettied eaves and deep sills. Each window unit has a double casement with a single casement either side and panelled hoppers above. An extra bay has been added to the north and south ends providing chambers and toilet facilities.

This wing contains a central entry corridor flanked by offices with a court room to either side and chambers beyond these. Throughout this wing walls are rendered, suspended ceilings have been inserted and the original layout of spaces has been altered.

The central entrance of the eastern wing has a recessed porch with twin paired columns flanked by a single column to either side. The northwest facade has a double casement, with a panelled hopper above, to either side of the central porch and stepped parapets are located midway in the hipped roof revealing the corners of the main court room.

Verandahs are located on the southeast, northwest and between the eastern and western wings. These have timber posts on masonry upstands with timber batten balustrade between, arched timber valance, raked boarded ceilings and timber floors. Arched panelled windows with central hopper sections, lighting the main court room, are located above the verandah line with deep curved timber eave brackets. Below these are French doors, with panelled glass upper portions and hopper fanlights, and casement windows opening onto the verandah.

Internally, the main court room contains silky oak fittings including the Judge's bench, which sits on a raised platform with a lion and unicorn crest on the wall behind, the prisoner's dock, jury and press seating and gallery rail. French doors and casement windows are separated by plaster pilasters with cornices above. At the eastern end, former witness rooms are located on either side of main court room. The northern room contains a hardboard ceiling with timber cover strips and the southern room has had an extension to the south to provide toilet facilities.

A row of palm trees is located to the northeast of the building lining the driveway from The Esplanade. To the west of this building is the Art Gallery.

=== Art Gallery ===
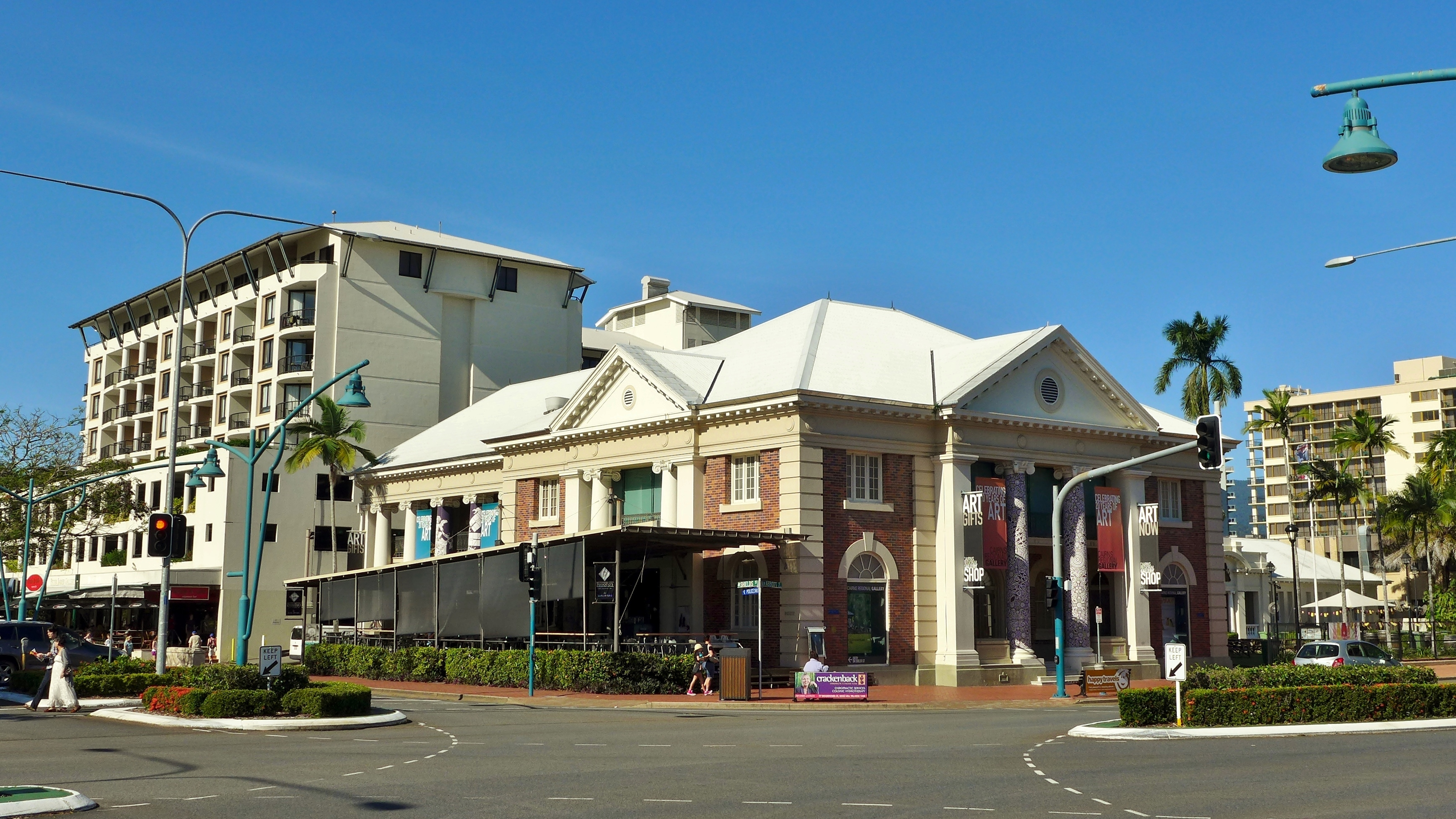
Cairns Regional Gallery, 2015

The Art Gallery, a two-storeyed masonry structure with a corrugated iron gable roof, is located on the eastern corner of the site fronting Abbott and Shields Streets.

This Georgian Revival building was designed to be extended to the northeast along the Shields Street frontage, with a repeat of the portico on the western end of that facade, but this extension has never occurred. The building has glazed bricks with rendered quoining and opening surrounds.

The symmetrical Abbott Street elevation, forming the main entry, consists of an Ionic central distyle in antis portico (receding into the building with two columns flanked by pilasters) on a rendered base with a circular window in the pediment. The recessed portico has a first floor balcony, with metal balustrade, off which open arched doorways and sash windows. The ground floor has a terrazzo portico floor and a central entry with rendered voussoir, with an arched window to either side which contain more recent aluminium framed glazing. The first floor has a casement window to either side of the portico.

The Shields Street elevation has a corner section similar to the Abbott Street elevation, but with a narrower portico forming a secondary entry and smaller arched windows to either side. The southern elevation, fronting the park, is similar again, but the ground floor portico is enclosed with an arched window, and the first floor has a recessed balcony.

The eastern wing is narrower than the corner section, with a columned two-storeyed verandah to both the northern and southern sides. French doors open off the first floor verandahs, and the ground floor has patterned terrazzo floors and a central entry with rendered voussoir on the northern side. The eastern elevation is rendered, with arched casement windows to the ground floor.

Internally, the ground floor corner section of the building contains a central open space with a room to each corner which frame the porticos between. The western corner room contains an enclosed staircase which has a terrazzo floor and stair, an iron balustrade, timber panelled walls and a window display cabinet to Abbott Street. The remaining corner rooms are used as display spaces, of which the eastern and southern rooms have timber panelled walls and the northern room has a barred window from its use as a strong room. The central space has four large columns, a plastered coffered ceiling, sections of timber and glass partitioning, some timber panelling, a timber counter, sections of terrazzo flooring and arched leaded fanlights. The first floor corner section is similar in plan and finishes, but has toilets located in the eastern corner room and none of its timber and glass partitions survive.

The eastern wing contains a central entry with vestibule and staircase, with offices to either side and a corridor leading to the corner section of the building. The entry has double timber doors with an arched leaded fanlight, timber panelling, timber reception with pilasters and entablature, moulded plaster ceilings and a patterned terrazzo floor leading to the staircase. The staircase has a terrazzo stair, iron balustrading and timber panelling. Timber doors with leaded glass panels and arched fanlights lead into the administration offices at the eastern end, which have suspended ceilings and air conditioning, and to the corridor leading to the corner gallery at the western end. Offices opening off this corridor, now used as storerooms, contain timber shelving and suspended ceilings. The first floor contains service rooms at the eastern end, with display spaces towards the western corner section. An arch which originally accessed a passage at the top of the stair leading to the northwest verandah has been closed in.

To the east of this building is the Court House, with the Abbott Street gardens to the southeast.

=== Abbott Street Gardens ===
The Abbott Street gardens form the southwest entry to the courthouse. These consist of a series of sinuous concrete paths and concrete edgings enclosing areas of lawn with clusters of plants. Palm trees are strategically located within the lawn areas, with a row forming a border to Abbott Street.

== Heritage listing ==
Cairns Court House Complex was listed on the Queensland Heritage Register on 21 October 1992 having satisfied the following criteria.

The place is important in demonstrating the evolution or pattern of Queensland's history.

The Cairns Court House Complex survives as an important illustration of the growth and rebuilding of Cairns in the interwar years, when Cairns was transformed from a late 19th century town to a progressive, post-war city. In particular, the place illustrates State Government confidence in Cairns as an important regional centre after the First World War, without which confidence little of the city's spectacular growth at this time would have been possible. The complex has sustained a continued government presence in Cairns since the establishment of the town in 1876, in particular as the site of the Cairns Court House from 1884 to 1992.

The place is important in demonstrating the principal characteristics of a particular class of cultural places.

In particular, the place illustrates State Government confidence in Cairns as an important regional centre after the First World War, without which confidence little of the city's spectacular growth at this time would have been possible.

The place is important because of its aesthetic significance.

The Cairns Court House Complex, comprising a single-storeyed masonry Court House and two-storeyed masonry former Public Offices together with established gardens, are an expression of interwar public architecture adapted to suit a tropical climate. There is classical detailing and interior finishes in the former Public Offices.

The place has a strong or special association with a particular community or cultural group for social, cultural or spiritual reasons.

The Cairns Court House Complex survives as an important illustration of the growth and rebuilding of Cairns in the interwar years, when Cairns was transformed from a late 19th century town to a progressive, post-war city.

The place has a special association with the life or work of a particular person, group or organisation of importance in Queensland's history.

The complex has sustained a continued government presence in Cairns since the establishment of the town in 1876, in particular as the site of the Cairns Court House from 1884 to 1992.
