= Turbot Street =

Street in Brisbane, Queensland

Turbot Street Queensland
- Coordinates: 27.4654°S 153.0256°E

General information
- Type: Street
- Location: Brisbane
- Length: 1.4 km (0.9 mi)

Major junctions
- Southwest end: Riverside Expressway
- North Quay; George Street; Roma Street; Albert Street; Edward Street; Wharf Street; Boundary Street; Wickham Street
- Northeast end: Wickham Street

Location(s)
- LGA(s): City of Brisbane
- Major suburbs: Brisbane CBD

Restrictions
- General: One-way traffic SW-NE

Turbot Street runs parallel to Ann Street and is on the northern side of the Brisbane CBD in Queensland, Australia. It is a major thoroughfare, linking as a three-to-five lane one-way street with the Riverside Expressway in the southwest to the suburb of Fortitude Valley in the northeast; address numbers run the same direction. It is a one-way pair with Ann Street.

== Naming ==
Turbot (pronounced 'terbet', not 'turbo') Street is not part of naming series of female British royalty used for the other parallel streets in the CBD. Turbot was an indigenous word used by the local Turrbal people.

== Major intersections ==
- Riverside Expressway
- North Quay
- George Street
- Roma Street
- Albert Street
- Edward Street, followed by the Wickham Terrace sliplane
- Wharf Street
- Boundary Street
- Wickham Street

== History ==
Turbot Street as a name existed prior to 1860. Appearing on Ham's 1863 map, a short street, it ran from today's North Quay, past the Roma Street intersection (then 'New Street') towards Albert and Edward Streets, all of functional 0.385 kilometres (0.239 mi). The western end of the street abutting the Brisbane River also had ferry steps, towards the then-Stanley Street, South Brisbane. The ferry point was closed in May 1875, and within a year the old shed was harbouring 'idle and disorderly people'.

To the north of North Quay, Turbot and George Streets was a dammed water hole known as Tank Stream which served as the colony's water supply from 1842 (and later gave its name to Tank Street). By the 1880s new water supplies were found and saw that area opened up to commercial premises. The 1850s, following the 'Hungry '40s', saw bullock teamsters staying at Humber's Forge on the corner of Turbot and George Streets. The section between George and Albert Streets was fairly much unpassable to vehicular traffic due to the deep gully running from Tank Street to Ann Street.

A ladies seminary, or 'school for young girls', was opened on the street in 1866, and was to include the teaching of English, French, and music.

Over the years, the construction of Turbot Street underwent various changes. Edward Street intersecting with Turbot Street was altered ca. 1867. In 1880, soil material from the road cutting of Ann Street was moved to Turbot Street between George and Roma Streets. Another cutting of Turbot Street occurred in 1884. By 1926 Turbot Street had extended from its original North Quay—Albert Street length, to Edward and Upper Edward Streets, a change from 0.385 kilometres (0.239 mi) to 0.600 kilometres (0.373 mi) long.

In December 1877, Alderman Pettigrew made a motion before the town council,

In order to relieve Queen-street of the traffic from the railway station to the Valley, that Turbot-street from Roma-street to Edward-street, thence by that street to Wickham-terrace, and thence by that terrace to near Wharf-street, be put in such passable order as will enable traffic to pass that way instead of by the way of Queen-street.

The year 1886 also saw the asphalting of footpaths on both sides of Turbot Street being undertaken.

The looseness of soil and presence of rock resulted in the death of two workers, Patrick Gleeson and Thomas McCullough, at the Turbot Street railway cutting in late 1888. The railway was extended from the 1873 Roma Street to Central terminus by 1889.

The major 1893 Brisbane flood, compared to Queen Street, had little impact on Turbot Street. Electric street lighting started to be introduced to the area by 1898. In 1900 Turbot Street was proposed as a new Brisbane town hall 3.5-acre site, at the top of Edward Street and near the railway station; the extending of Turbot Street to Creek Street, closing Upper Edward Street. At this time the land reserve above Central Rail Station had been set-aside as a school reserve. With the municipal hall proposal not progressed by 1904, Turbot Street was not extended.

Public telephone boxes appeared after 1910. Street gas lamps were still being superseded by electric lighting by 1919, between the Edward Street to Roma Street sections. Never explained was the serious explosions of five postal department electric utility hole covers on Monday, 28 July 1913.

In late-1917, a deputation of businessmen protested the closure of the street around the fruit markets and police barracks to traffic. This was introduced due to traffic congestion in that area, as well as issues created by earlier colonial land divisions. It was stated that over 400 horse carts used the area between 8.30 am and 1.00 pm, as well as being a thoroughfare from Spring Hill. The closure was intended for land resumption by the government between Roma and Albert Streets. A 1924 photograph shows the road again open, and two-directional traffic flow.

On 23 October 1922, the death of a fruit vendor Randolph Nolan Birrell occurred on the street. After leaving the fruit markets following a hard fall against a truck, an unsteady Birrell appearing inebriated, went across to a pie cart. The 'Pieman King' told Birrell that he could not get a pie without money. Birrell then went to the front of the cart and hit the pony drawing it soundly on the nose. Confronted, the owner pushed away Birrell, who fell backwards and struck his head on the footpath. Regaining consciousness a short while later, he was then charged with public drunkenness before being taken to the watchhouse. Transported to hospital, after his death, he was determined to have died of a fracture to the skull. Charges of unlawful killing against the pieman were later discontinued.

A newspaper sensation occurred the following year at one of the street's boarding houses when on 16 February 1923 a male tried to use a .32 calibre revolver to unlawfully kill a female, after she indicated she would not leave her allegedly-violent husband.

During World War II, a tunnel and large underground air raid shelter were proposed on the northern side of Turbot Street. A fire was also labelled as suspected sabotage during this period. On Tuesday, 13 January 1942 saw tragedy when three fire brigade officers died in a fire at the R. M. Gow Pty Ltd office and warehouse. Stock including £65,000 of emergency food supplies was destroyed, and large building valued at £25,000 was ruined; impacting 200 employees. Third Officer Alfred Lambert and firemen Henry Schirmer and George Uren were overcome by smoke and fumes in the office. To 1951, this was the worst brigade disaster.

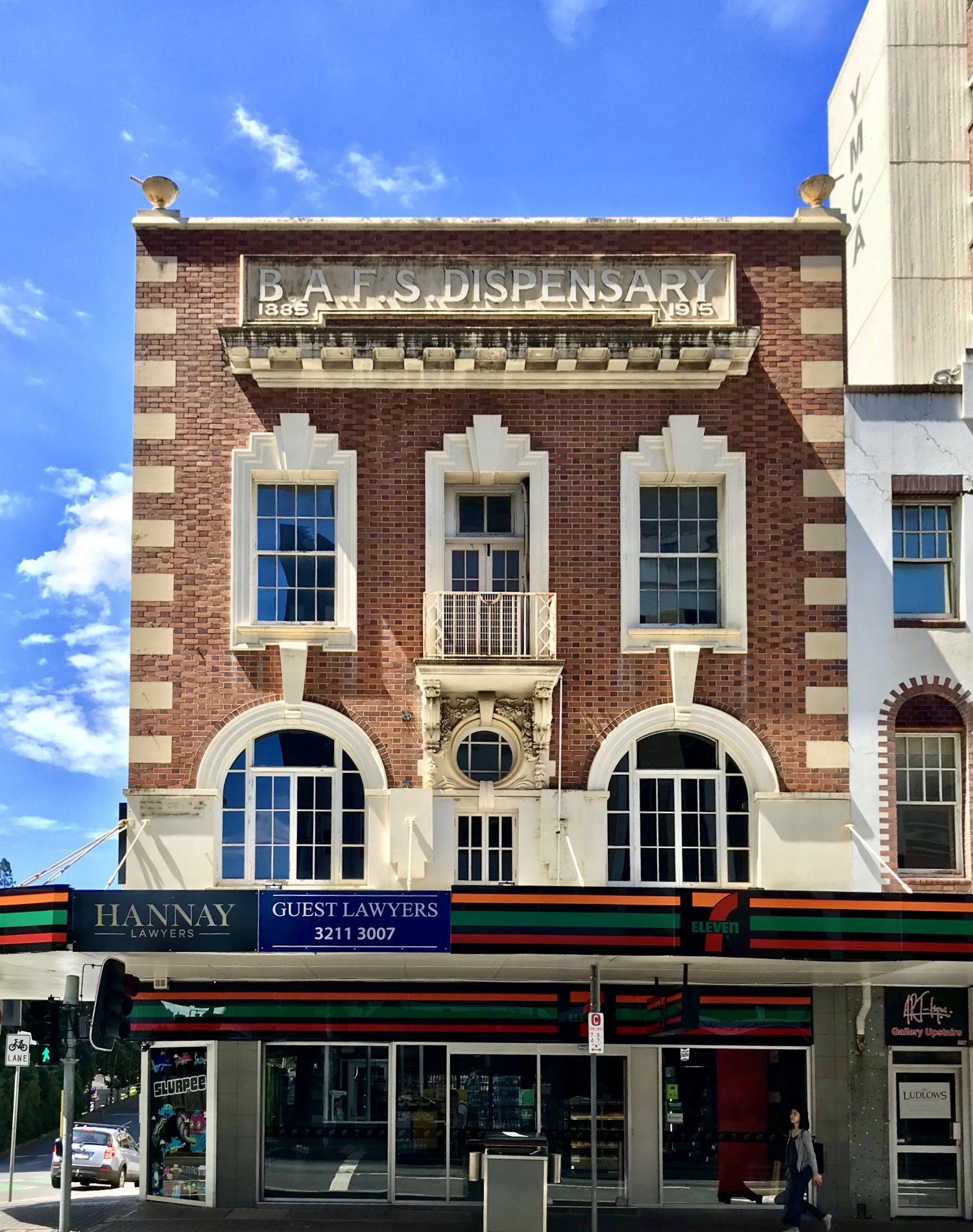
BAFS Building, George Street facade, 2018

The 'Arcade Murder' of 19-year-old typist Bronia Mary Armstrong occurred near the BAFS Institute rooms on 10 January 1947, where a 49-year-old accountant was charged. Described by the presiding judge as 'probably one of the most brutal and pathetic cases in the history of Queensland crime', the suspect was found guilty, sentenced to life at Boggo Road Gaol, and took his own life nine days later on 21 March 1947.

Following on from the extension of the railway line and tunnel underway from Roma Street in 1889, concern with the weight of the first Trades Hall over the tunnel resulted in land resumption, with a new site selected at Upper Edward Street for the hall. The presence of the second trade union hall with the intersection along Turbot Street with Edward Street also meant Labour Day processions and street marches on Turbot Street. This included the 1927 lock-out of 1500 railwaymen, and 1948 clash between police and communists. The poem 'The Tears of Turbot-street' by E. N. MacCulloch was penned in 1927 with reference to the Trades Hall and Labour Day.

Trams never ran on Turbot Street, although they crossed it at Edward Street. In 1960, the Gardens trolley bus route was altered to include Turbot Street, although Brisbane trolley buses ceased service on 13 March 1969 and were replaced by buses.

At some time, Turbot Street connected straight through to Wickham Street (a change from 0.6 kilometres (0.37 mi) to 1.4 kilometres (0.87 mi) long), and Ann and Turbot Streets became a one-way pair. RACQ representations sought the highly congested area at the produce markets become one-way. A later 1954 proposal to make the street one-way between George and Roma Streets was also to assist the markets through increased traffic speed, and allow more space for more retailers.

In 1971 the Turbot Street Bypass was constructed, including over Creek Street. Such construction saw the demolition of the building used by the Twelfth Night Theatre, as well as the 1878 Roma Street Police Station.

In 2009, the vehicle speed limit for the Brisbane CBD was reduced to 40 km/h, except for Ann and Turbot Streets which remained at 60 km/h (Ann Street's speed was lowered to 40 km/h on 5 November 2018, east of Wharf Street, to the Riverside Expressway).

== Landmarks ==
Many Brisbane landmarks are or were located on Turbot Street (as numbered, starting from the intersection at the Riverside Expressway):

- corner with North Quay (right-side) – Inns of Court facility. First purchased in 1960 by the Barristers Chambers Limited, the building consisted of some 60 chambers. In the mid-1980s, it was replaced by a twenty-level Inns of Court
- corner with North Quay – former site of the Adult Deaf and Dumb Institute, later the Queensland Deaf Society (opened 1918)
- former site of the Richmond Villa boarding establishment, near North Quay. Operated by Mrs Raphael Lewin (1870s–1906), Mrs Bartley (1906–), until at least 1934 with Annie Kelly. By 1946, owned by the Independent Order of Rechabites, the site was sold to McDonnell & East for future expansion, for £5000
- former site of the Marlborough House boarding establishment, near North Quay (1900s), as well as Ashford Villa (1886) near North Quay, and Mrs Lowther's Clare Cottage (1884) near George Street
- 32 Turbot Street (left-side) – Santos Place (2009) was formerly a warehouse and laneway for McDonnell & East merchant store. Prior to this, the site was Adam Fiebig's two-story Crown Hotel
- 33 Turbot Street (right-side) – former site of The Hawaiian Eye and The Manor nightclubs (1960s)
- former location of Kelly's British Empire Hotel (ca. 1865), at the intersection with George Street. The new hotel included seven large bedrooms, dining rooms, parlours, and stables
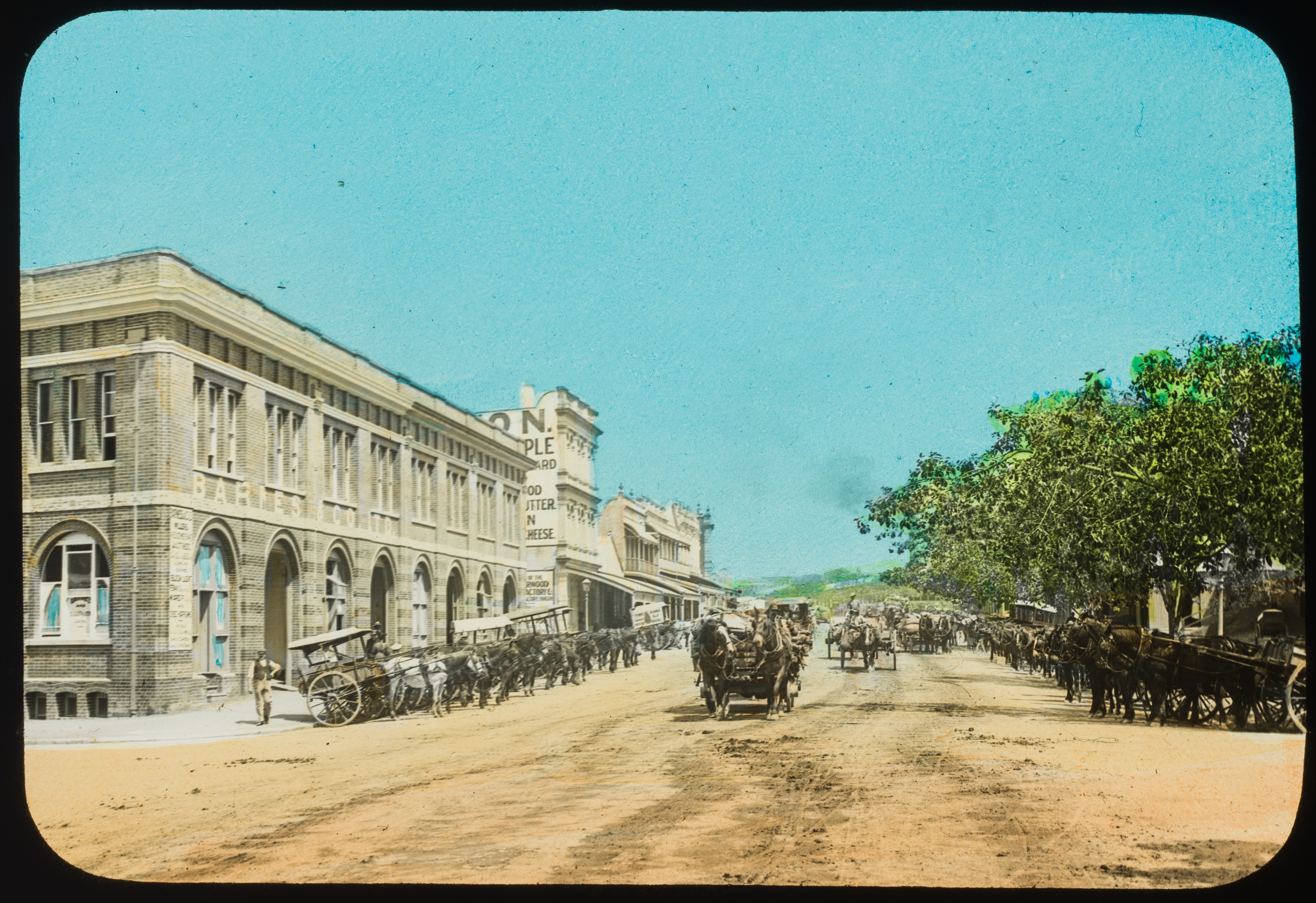
- Fruit and produce market building in Turbot Street, circa 1910
  former Turbot Street Fruit Market site as part of the Brisbane Fruit and Produce Exchange, with a building frontage of 198 feet (60 m). Opened in 1906, wholesalers established a market as a rival to the nearby municipally-regulated Roma Street Markets, until the creation in 1964 of the Rocklea markets. Due to the traffic congestion, it was proposed to move both the Roma Street and Turbot Street markets, possibly towards Countess Street on the other side of the railway yards
- corner with 331 George Street (SE corner; right-side) – Brisbane Associated Friendly Societies (BAFS) Building, built from 1915 to 1916 (Queensland Heritage Register-listed)
- corner with 363 George Street (NE corner; left-side) – Brisbane Magistrates Court building (2004)
- 64 Turbot Street (left-side) – former site of The Open Door nightclub (1960s)
- former location of the Female Refuge and Infants Home (1880–1918), also known as Mrs Drew's Home, until it was merged with Saint Mary's Home, Taringa, on the Toowong property in 1919

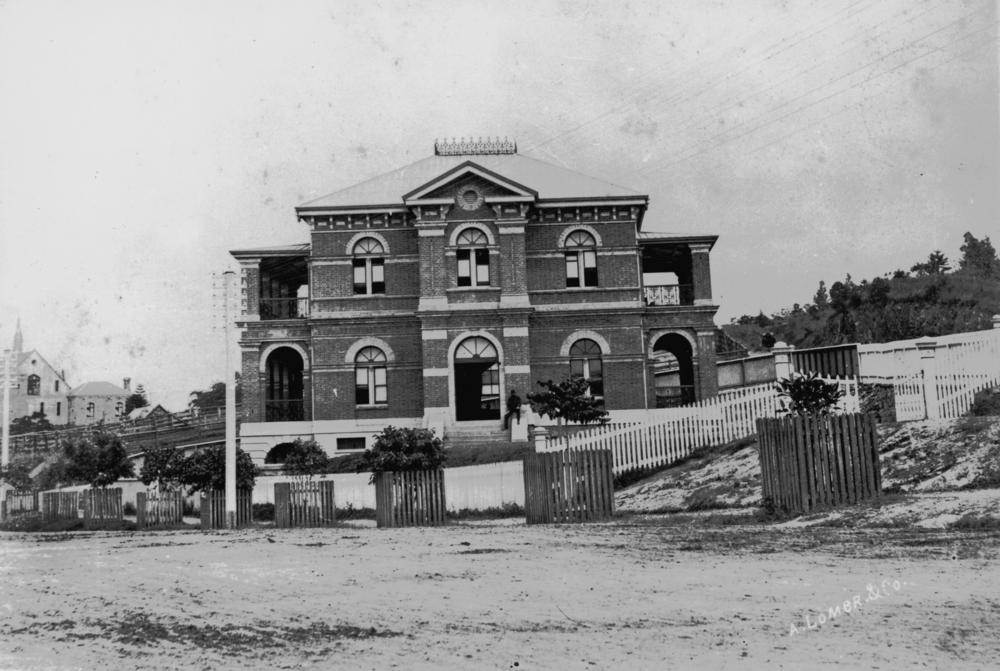
Roma Street Police Station, 1883

- former site of the Roma Street Police Station (1878–1967) (right-side). The building was demolished to make way for the Turbot Street overpass. A site plaque was dedicated in July 1988. Before the police station was Mrs Hughes' cottage, and prior to that, the Brisbane horse and cattle pound
- Sir William Glasgow Memorial (1964) (right-side), in recognition of Queensland-born soldier and senator (Queensland Heritage Register-listed)
- 143 Turbot Street, corner with Albert Street (SE corner; right-side) – Suncorp Plaza, formally the SGIO building, completed in 1971 and once was the tallest building in Brisbane. In the 1970s the 'Top of the Town' glamorous lounge bar and club was renown
- former location of the SGIO Theatre
- 168 Turbot Street (left-side) – Brisbane Dental Hospital and College, an imposing, neo-Georgian, two-storey, rendered masonry building, built from 1938 to 1941 (Queensland Heritage Register-listed). It backs onto Wickham Park, and extended to the top of the cliff along Turbot Street, before King Edward Park
- locale of a former Brisbane Gymnasium Club, next to the dental hospital. An organisation was in place from February 1882, but the building was not constructed until 1888.

The classroom is 60ft by 40ft., and 20ft. to the wall-head, with an open queen-post roof, giving an additional height of 8ft. to the collar-ties, the roof itself being lined underside of purlins, which will, when completed, present a finished and pleasing appearance. The roof timbers are of colonial pine. The building is of hardwood framing throughout with cross braces, ties, &c. At the rear of the classroom are two dressing-rooms 14ft. 6in. by 10ft., and a bathroom 10ft. by 7ft., the dressing-rooms being fitted up with the necessary lockers for members. The porch which faces towards the Edward Street side is 12ft. by 6ft. with flight of steps to the entrance, and is enclosed with handsome iron railing.

Involved with women's boxing in Australia, it was also used as a dance hall. By 1935 the building was a home for the unemployed. The area towards Jacob's Ladder was to become part of the unrealised new government precinct

- 224 Turbot Street (left-side) – King Edward Park Air Raid Shelter, built ca. 1942
- Jacob's Ladder (left-side), beside King Edward Park
- Public art (Forme del Mito: Forms of Myth; 1983) at intersection with Edward Street, beside the air raid shelter, Jacob's Ladder, and the IBM building
- 348 Edward Street (NW corner; left-side) – site of the original Brisbane Trades Hall, near to the high-rise IBM building. Also the site of the former Queensland Teachers' Training College
- corner with Edward Street (SW corner; right-side) – former site of the South African War Memorial of a mounted soldier, unveiled in December 1919. It was established from funds from 1902, with a total cost of £1750 for the casting of the statue, with the pedestal and engraving of the names another £785. It is now in the nearby ANZAC Square
- entry to the Wickham Terrace Car Park (left-side)
- 309 Edward Street 'Rail Centre 2 Plaza' building stretching above Turbot Street to 317 Edward Street (left-side) – building also houses the Museum of Lands, Mapping and Surveying
- Central railway station (right-side), serving by all suburban and interurban City network lines
- 249 Turbot Street (right-side) – Sofitel Hotel
- 73 Wickham Terrace intersecting Turbot Street (left-side) – Inchcolm, Spring Hill, a heritage-listed former office 1930 building
- 32 Wickham Terrace (right-side) – Saint Andrew's Lutheran Church, and nearby All Saints Anglican Church, Brisbane, a heritage-listed 1869-construction church
- Cathedral Square.

Other former places along Turbot Street include:

- YMCA boarding house rooms (1920s).

There was also a Turbot Lane ca. 1890s.

== Parks ==
=== King Edward Park ===
Named in honour of King Edward VII (1841–1910) in the early part of the 20th century, the one-acre parklands is part of the Wickham Park and Observatory Park recreation area green space that was part of Turbot Street to Wickham Terrace, Brisbane. While Wickham Park was owned by the municipal council, King Edward Park was state government land. It is bounded to the east by Jacob's Ladder.

In February 1990, the park was reopened as a sculpture park. It contains art works by:

- Robert J. Morris, with work 'Juxtaposition I' (1990)
- Fumio Nishimura, with work 'Memories of wind' (1986) in granite, formerly from the World Expo 88 site
- Robert Parr (1923–), with work 'Still life with landscape' (1990) in painted steel.

=== Cathedral Square ===
East from Wharf Street, and between Turbot and Ann Streets is Cathedral Square. Its name comes from the nearby St John's Anglican Cathedral.

In 1887 this area was set aside for the construction of a new fire station. The Brisbane Fire Brigade Headquarters was officially opened on 11 November 1908. A move of the headquarters was proposed in 1943 to Kemp Place and Ivory Street, Fortitude Valley, Brisbane, although this was not achieved until 1964. A plaque on the site notes the change from 'a volunteer bucket brigade to horse-drawn steam pumps, to a motorised permanent fire-fighting force'.

Within the park beside Turbot Street is the statute 'El emigrante' unveiled in February 2000 to honour the early Lebanese settlers who from about 1860 established a presence in Australia, 'sewing the bonds of loyalty, friendship and hard work'.

== Gallery ==
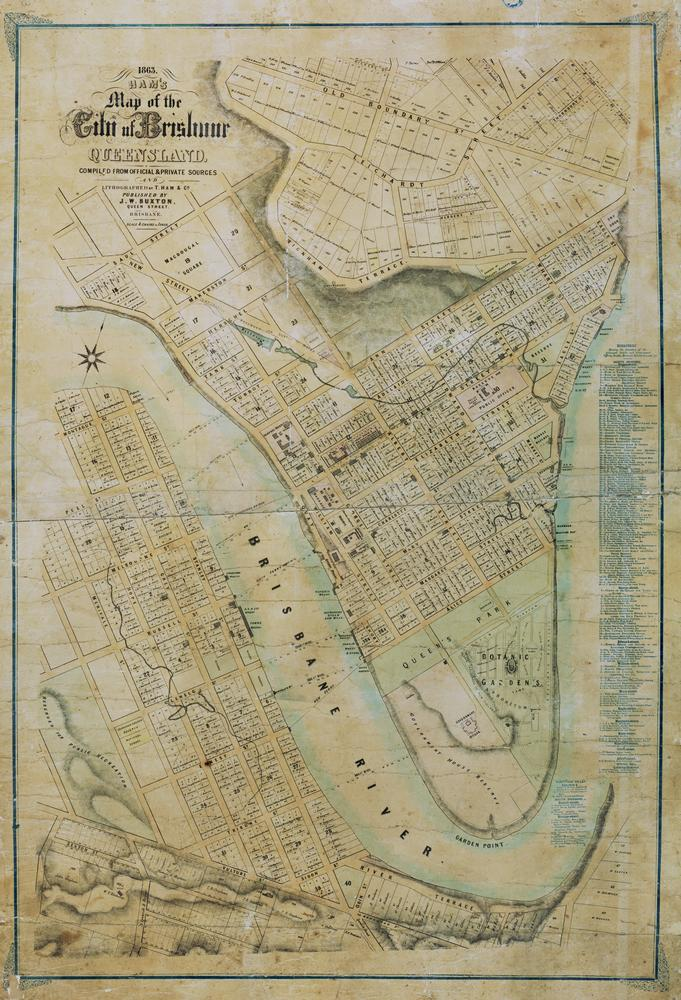
Map showing a short Turbot Street, 1863

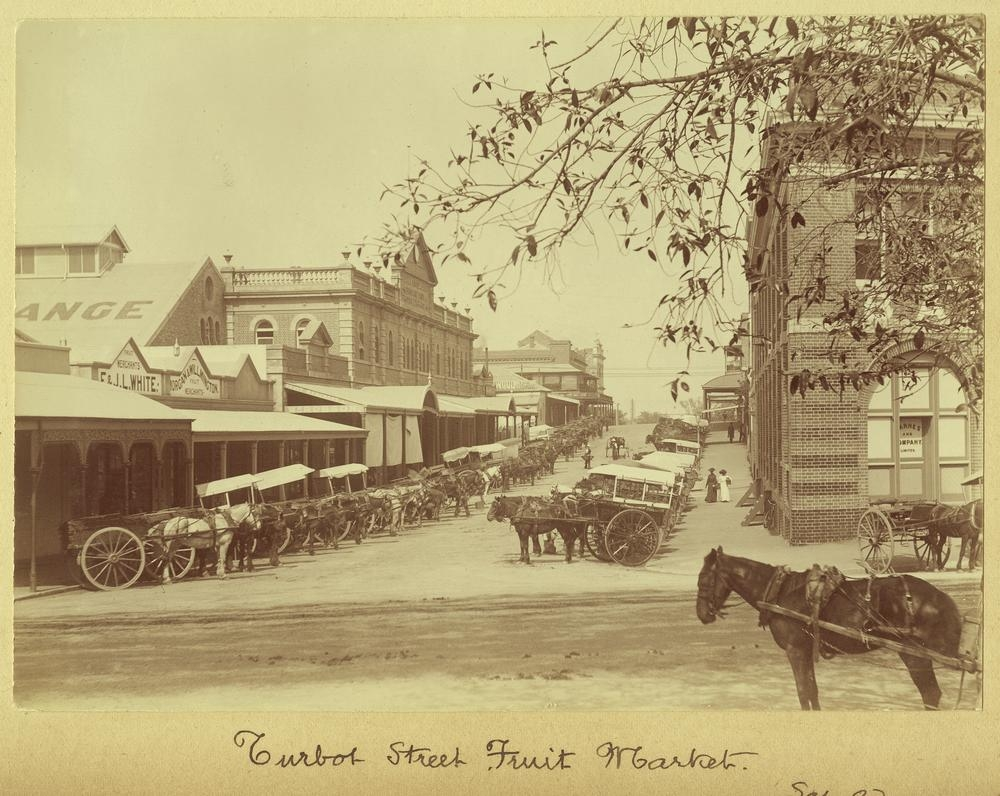
Fruit market, September 1907

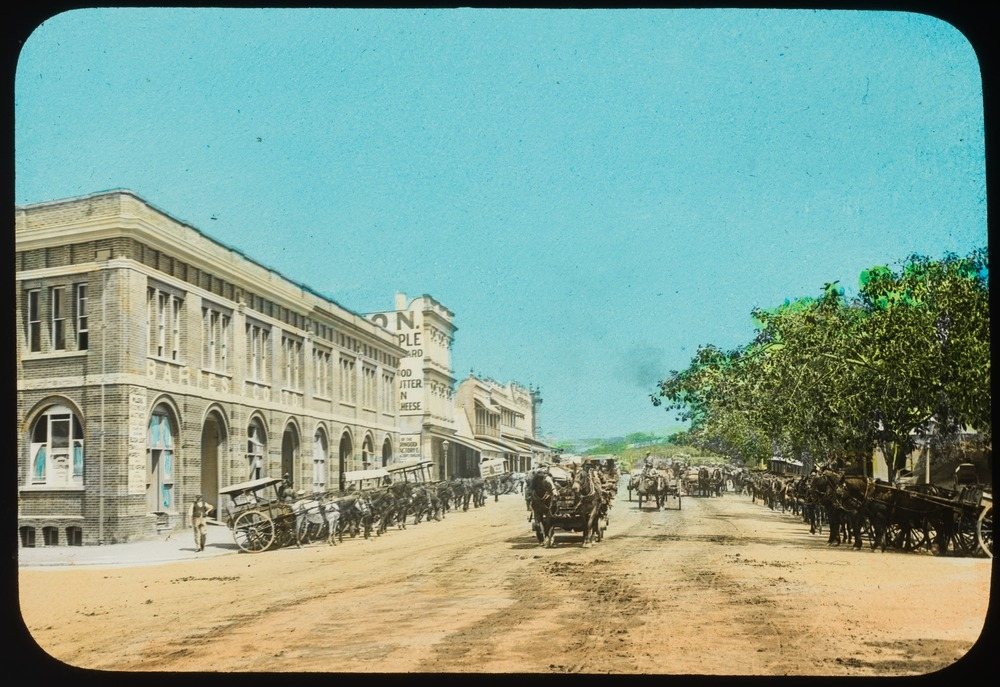
Fruit and produce market building, ca. 1910

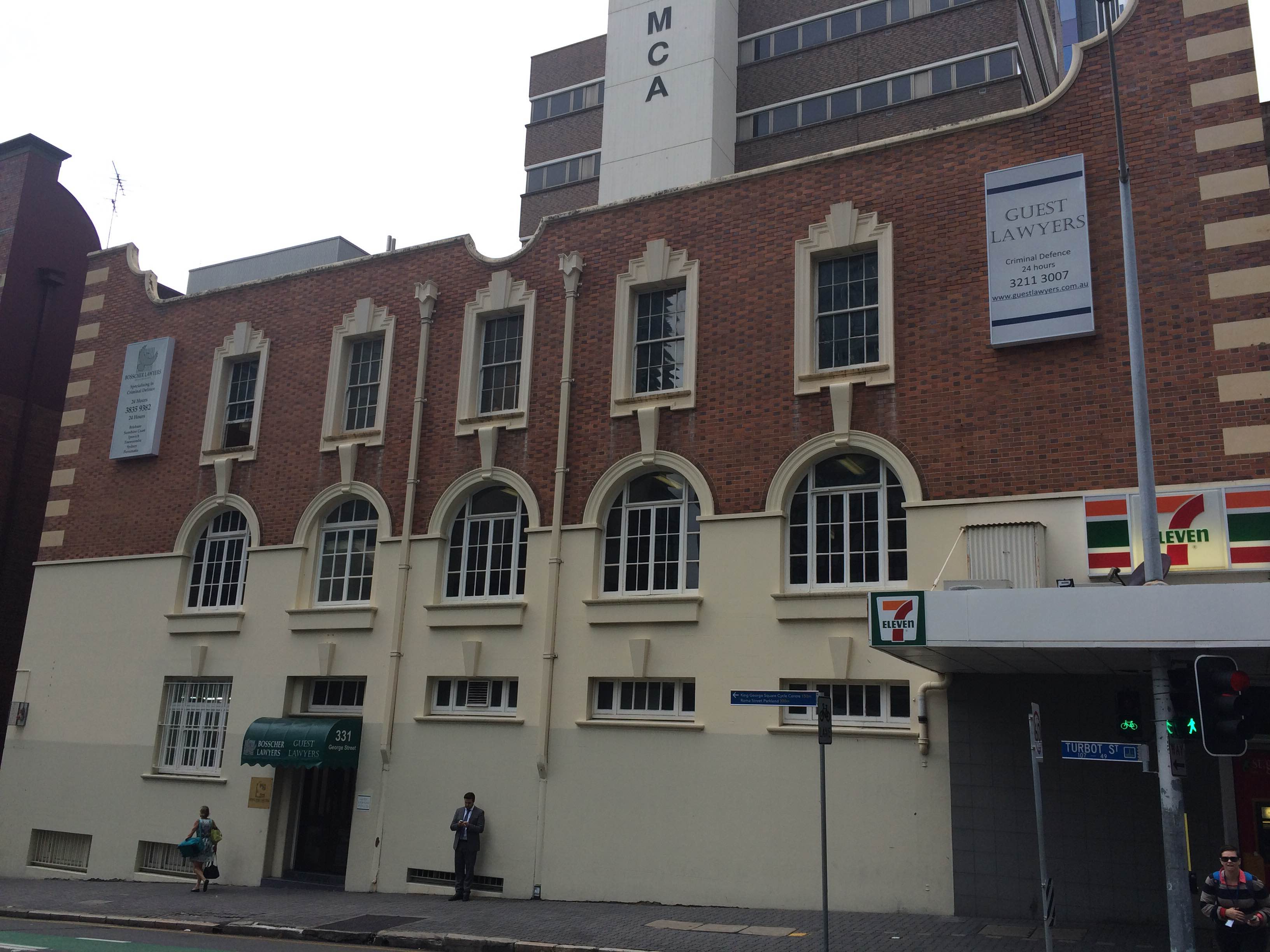
BAFS Building, Turbot Street facade, 2015

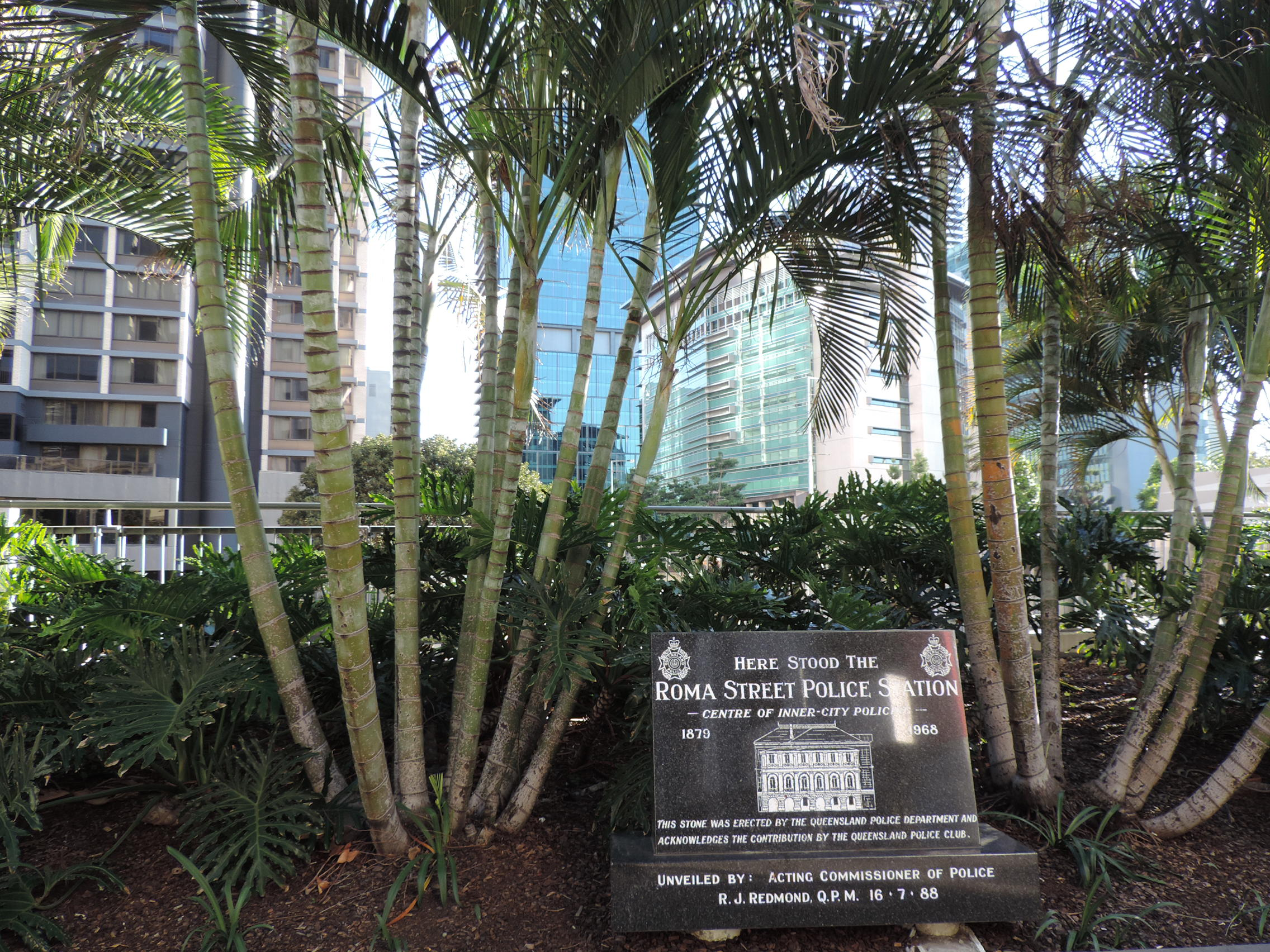
Roma Street Police Station plaque, 2019

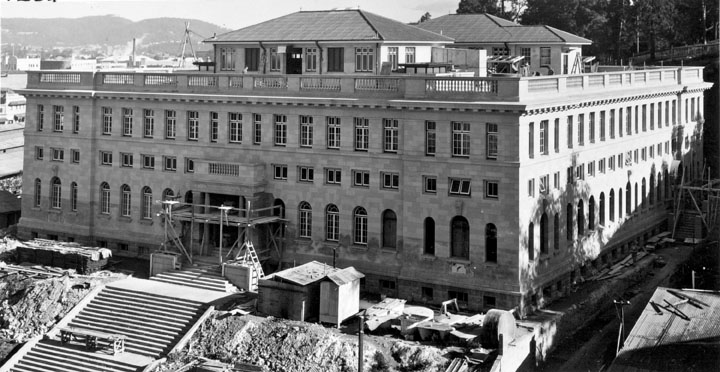
Brisbane Dental Hospital and College, June 1940

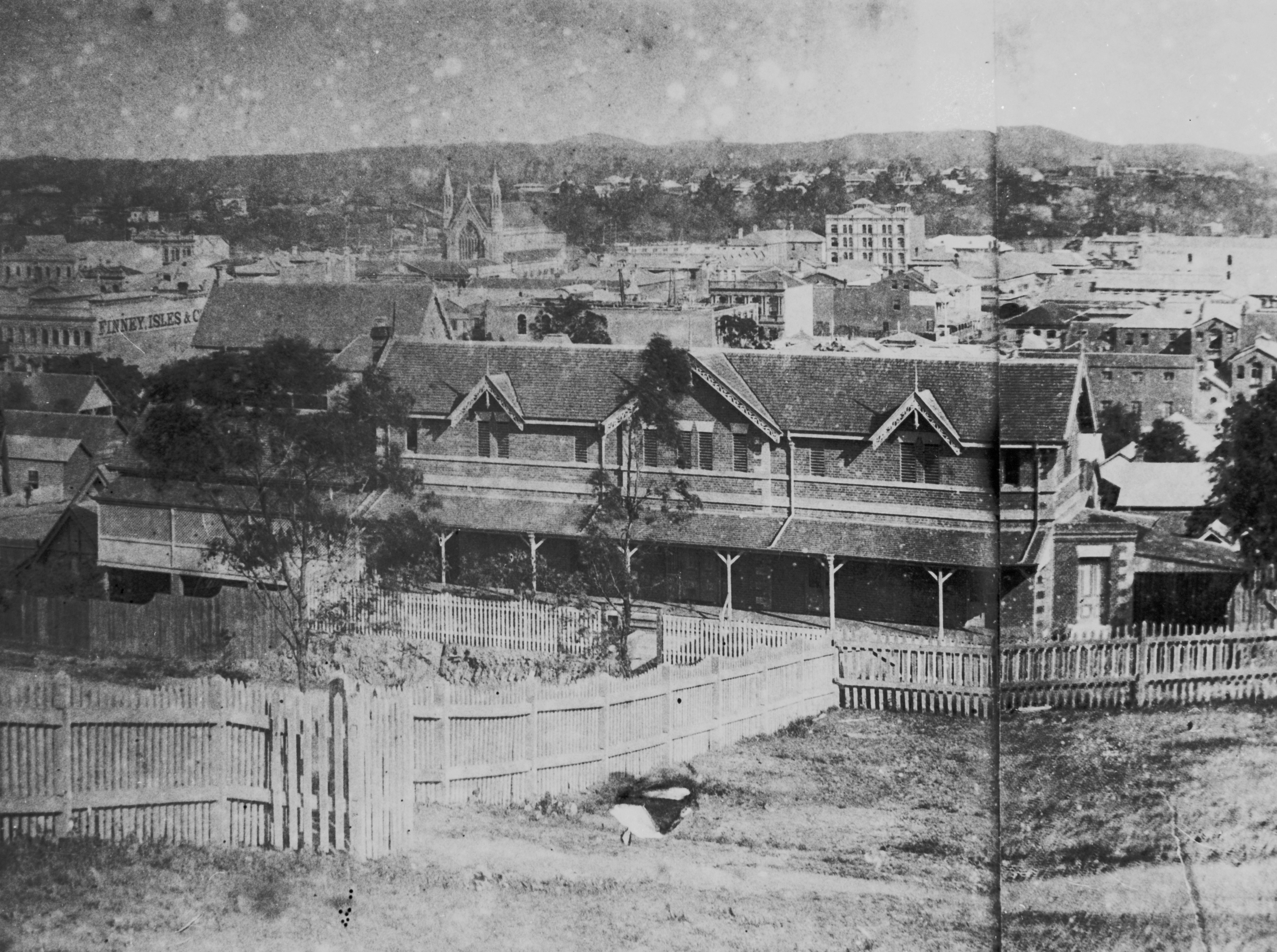
Brisbane Female Refuge and Infants Home ca. 1885, looking south-east

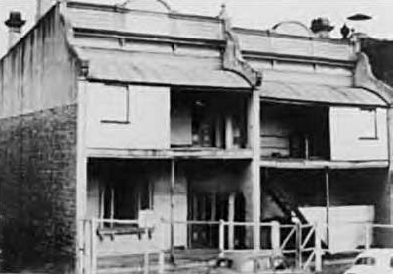
First premises of the Queensland Stock Institute (ca. 1953)

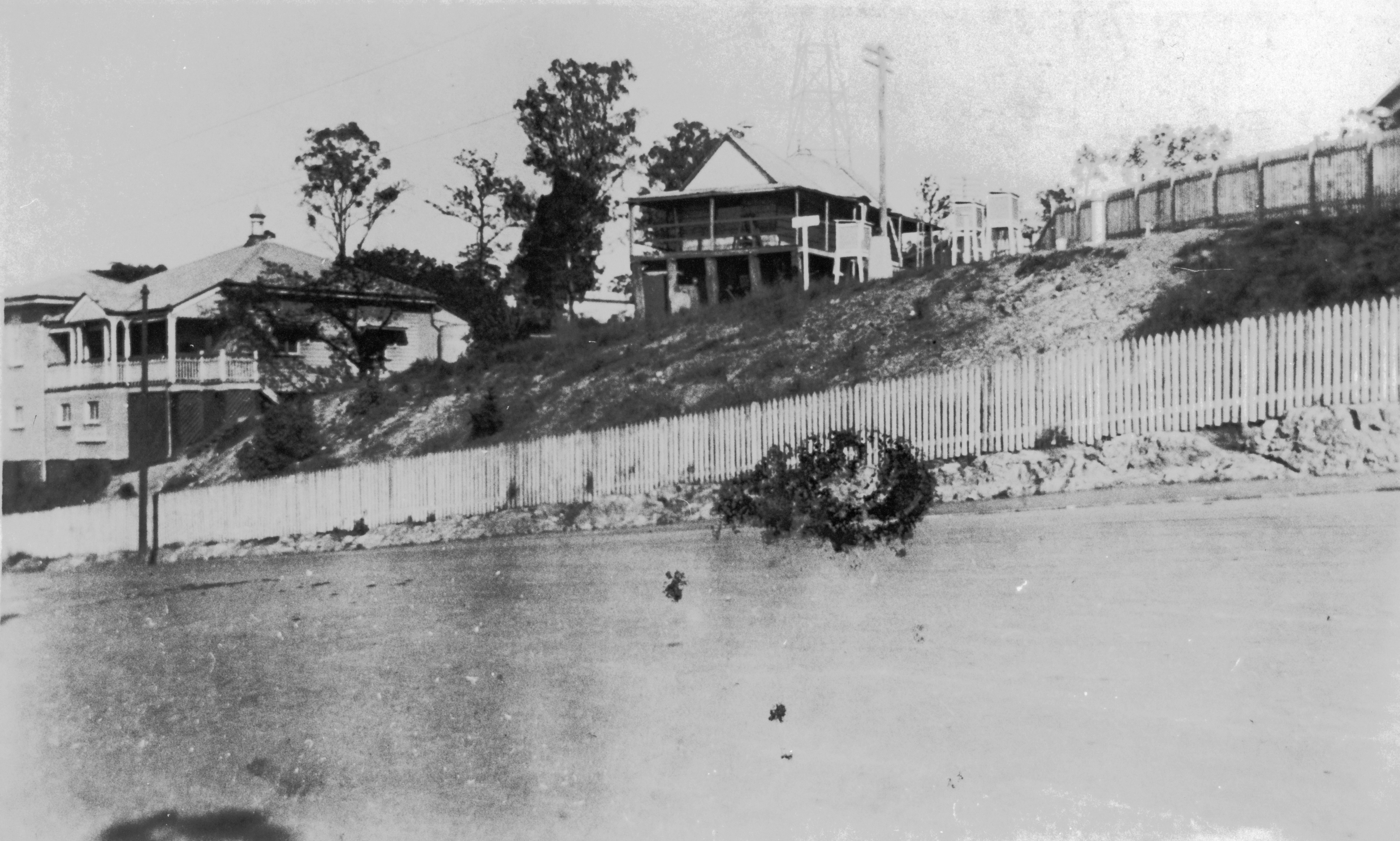
Commonwealth Meteorological Bureau, ca. 1921

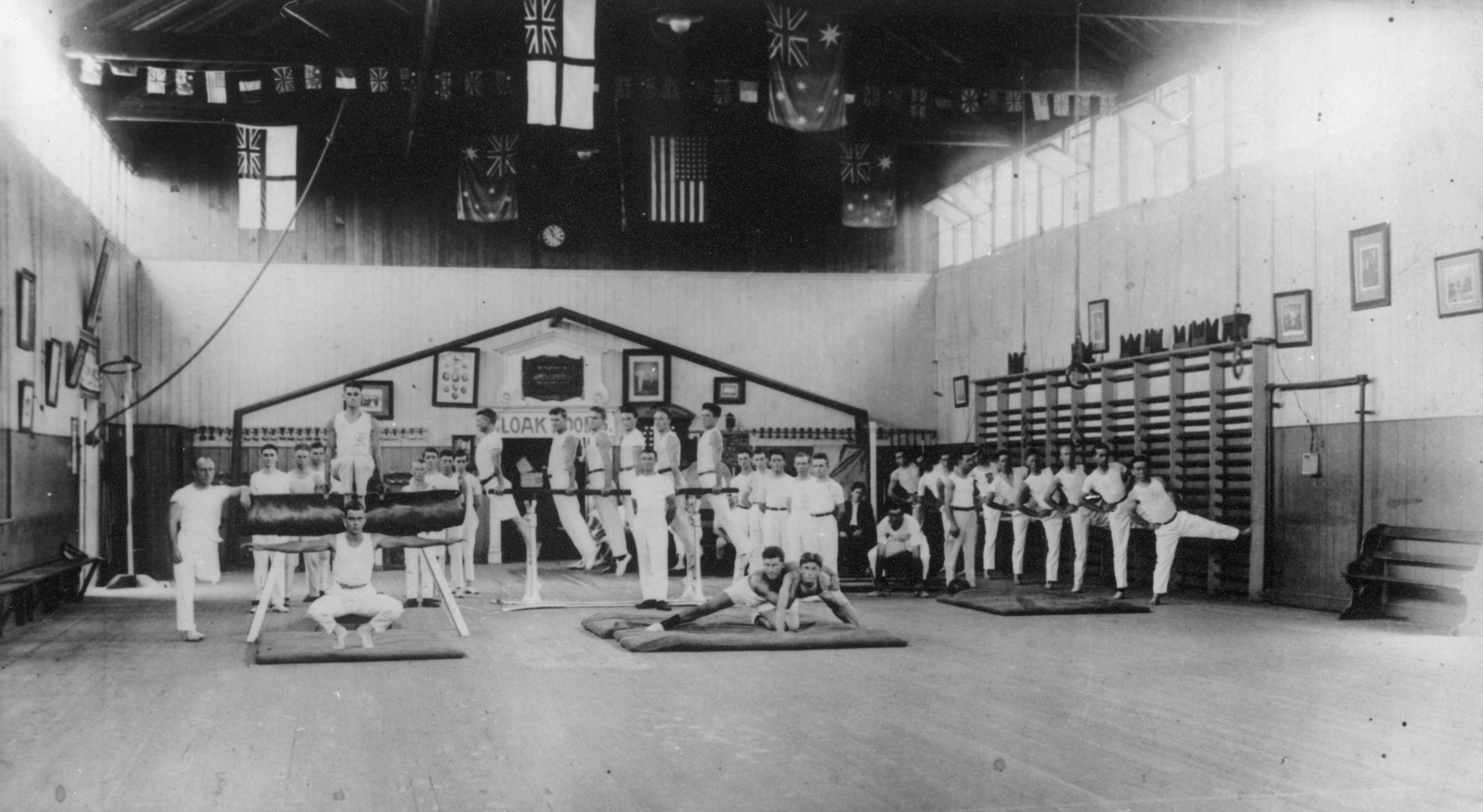
Members of the Turbot Street Gymnastics Club, 1922

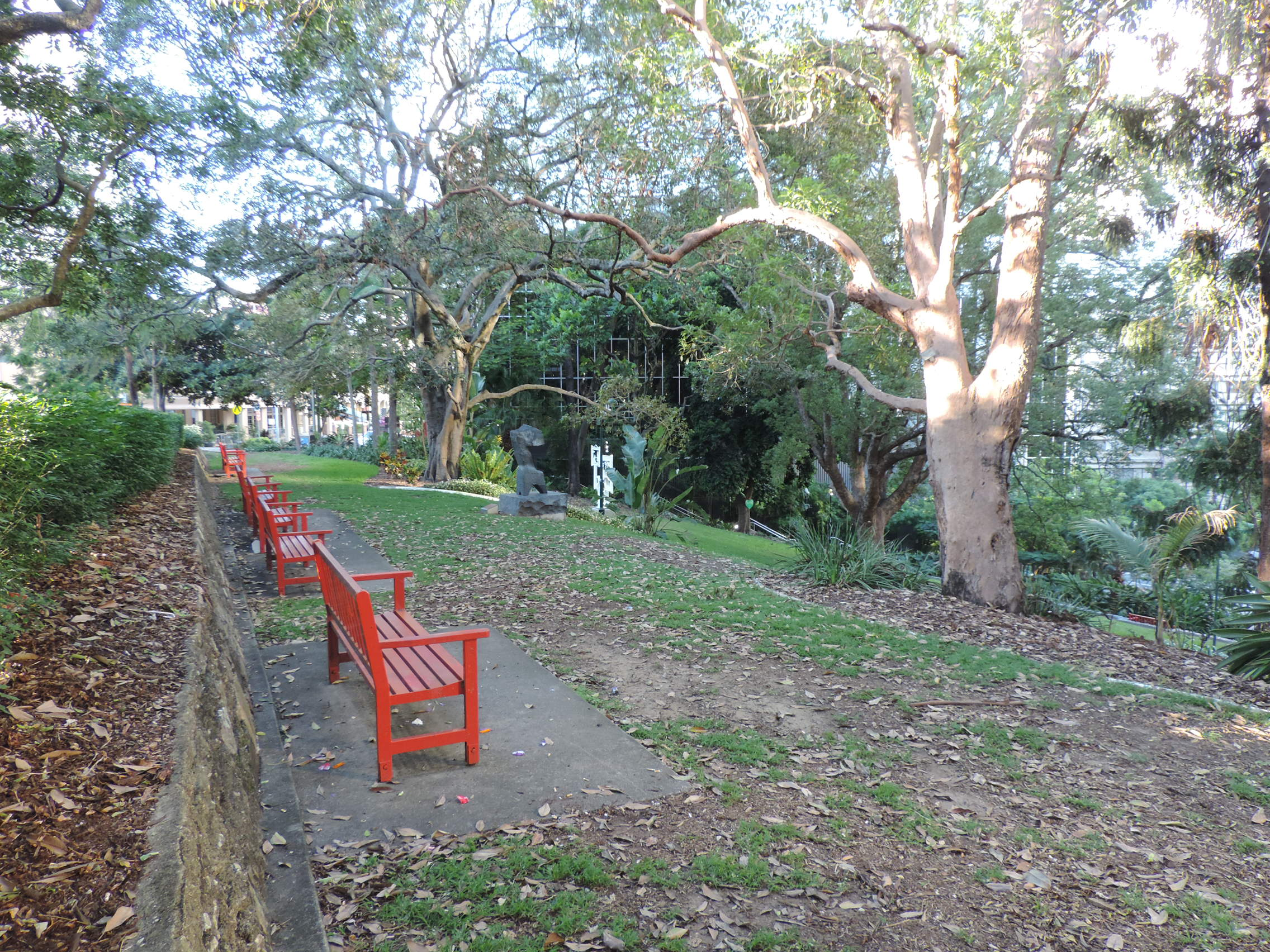
King Edward Park towards Jacob's Ladder, 2019

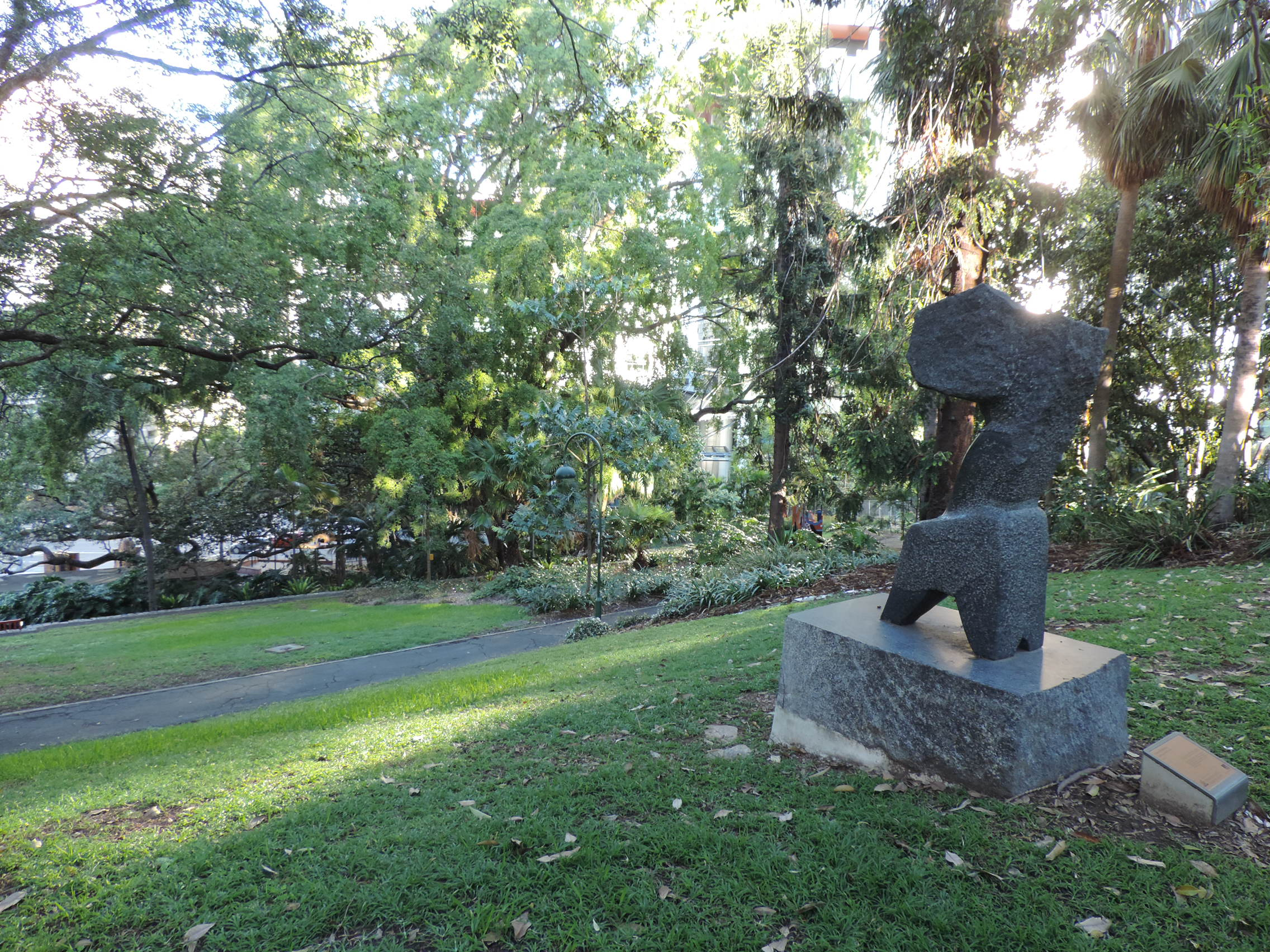
King Edward Park towards Turbot Street, 2019

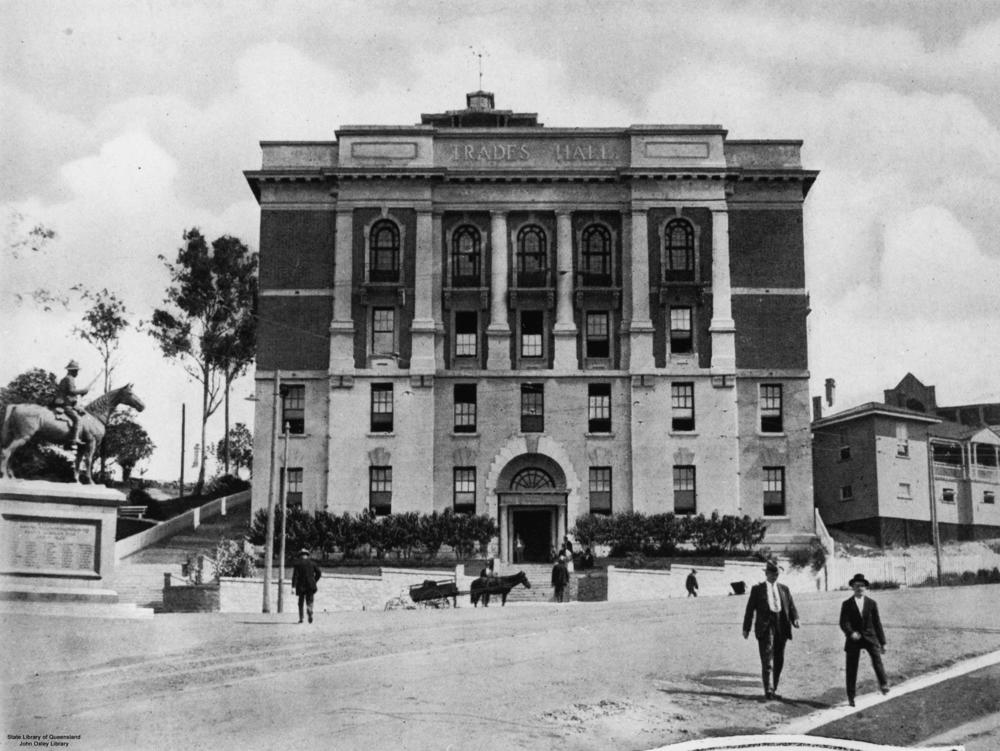
Jacob's Ladder to the left of Brisbane Trades Hall, ca. 1928

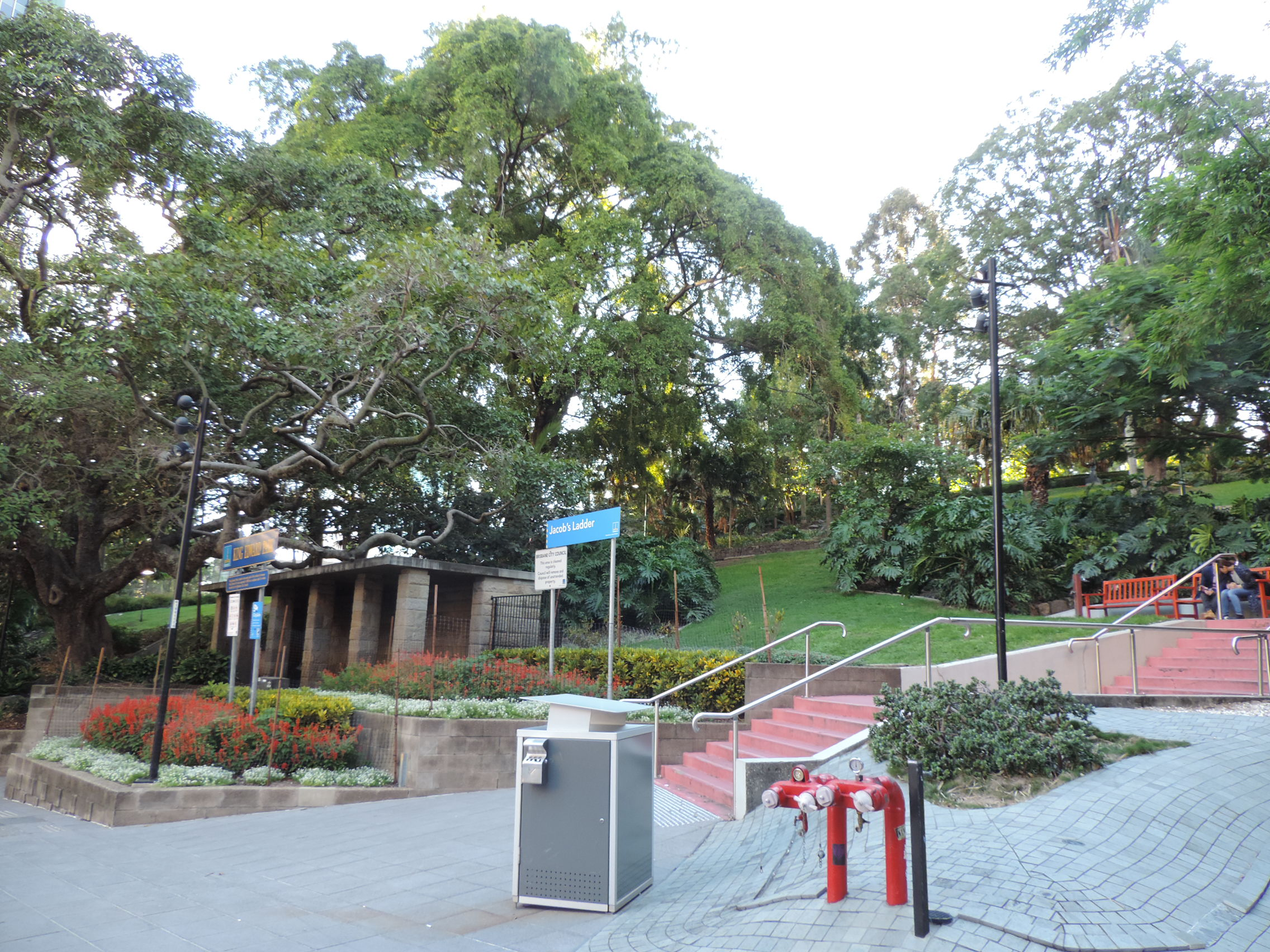
Air raid shelter, King Edward Park, and the start of Jacob's Ladder, 2019

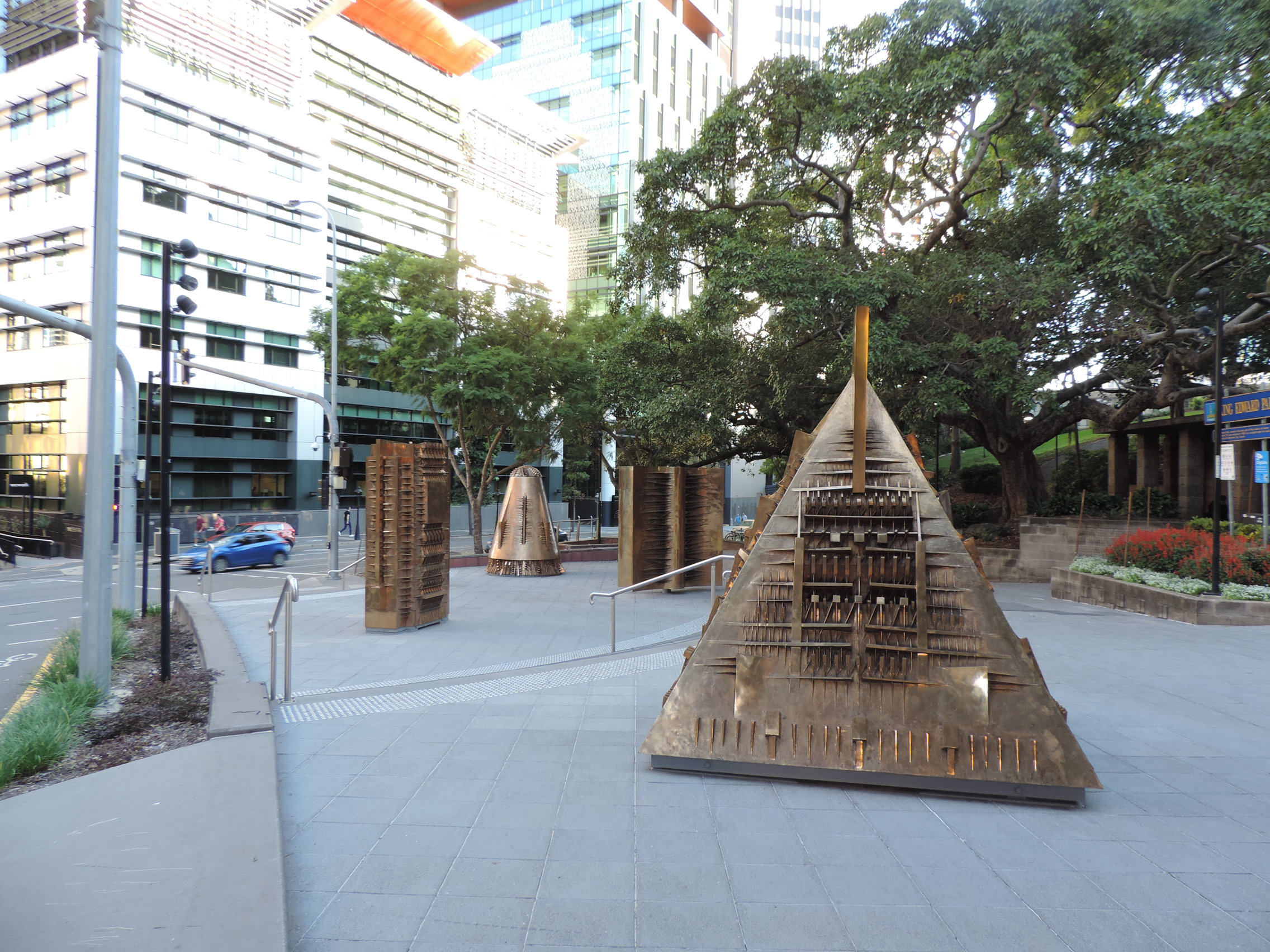
Arnaldo Pomodoro's sculptures forming 'Forme del Mito: Forms of Myth' (1983), 2019

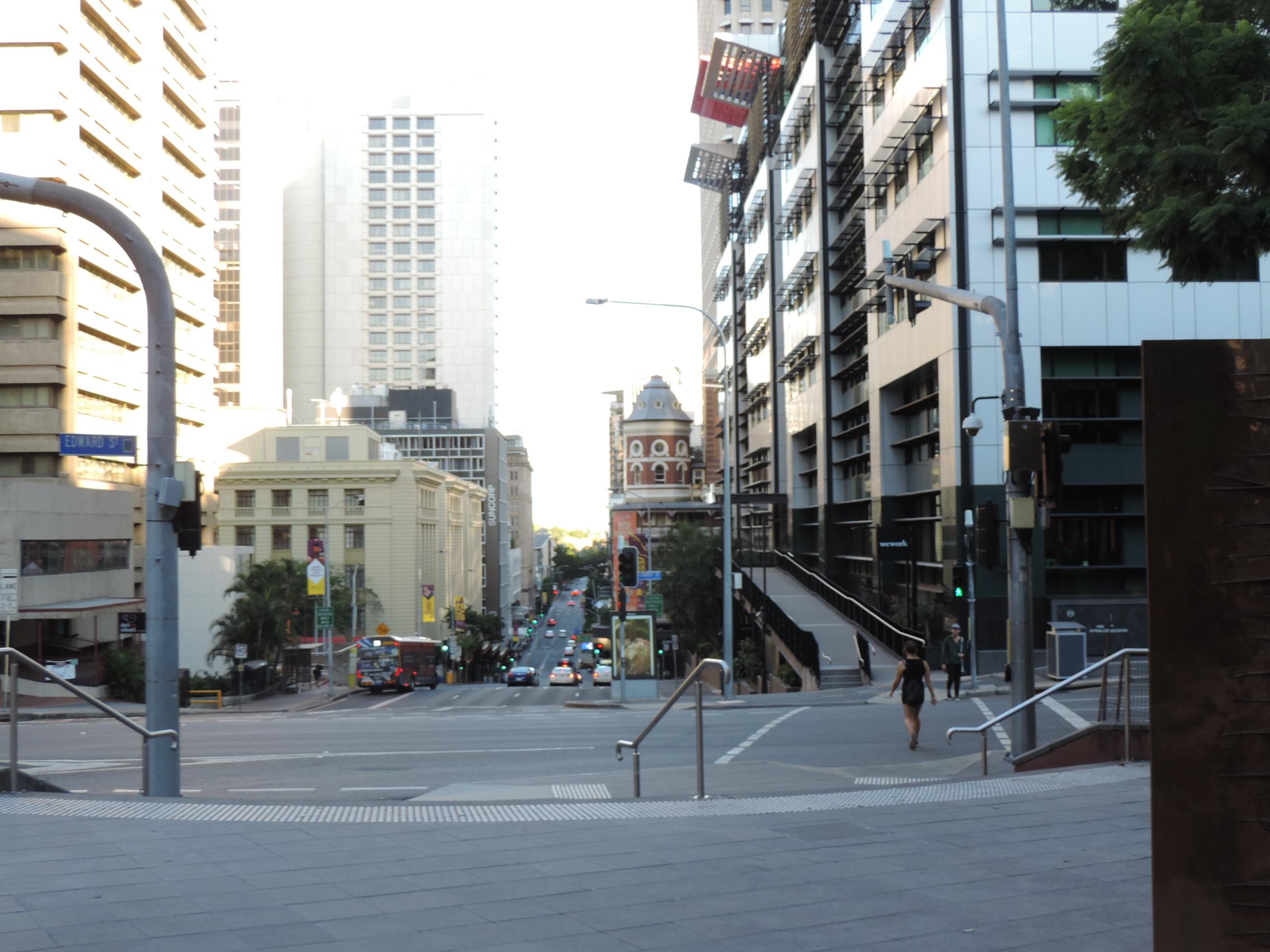
View from Turbot Street down Edward Street, 2019

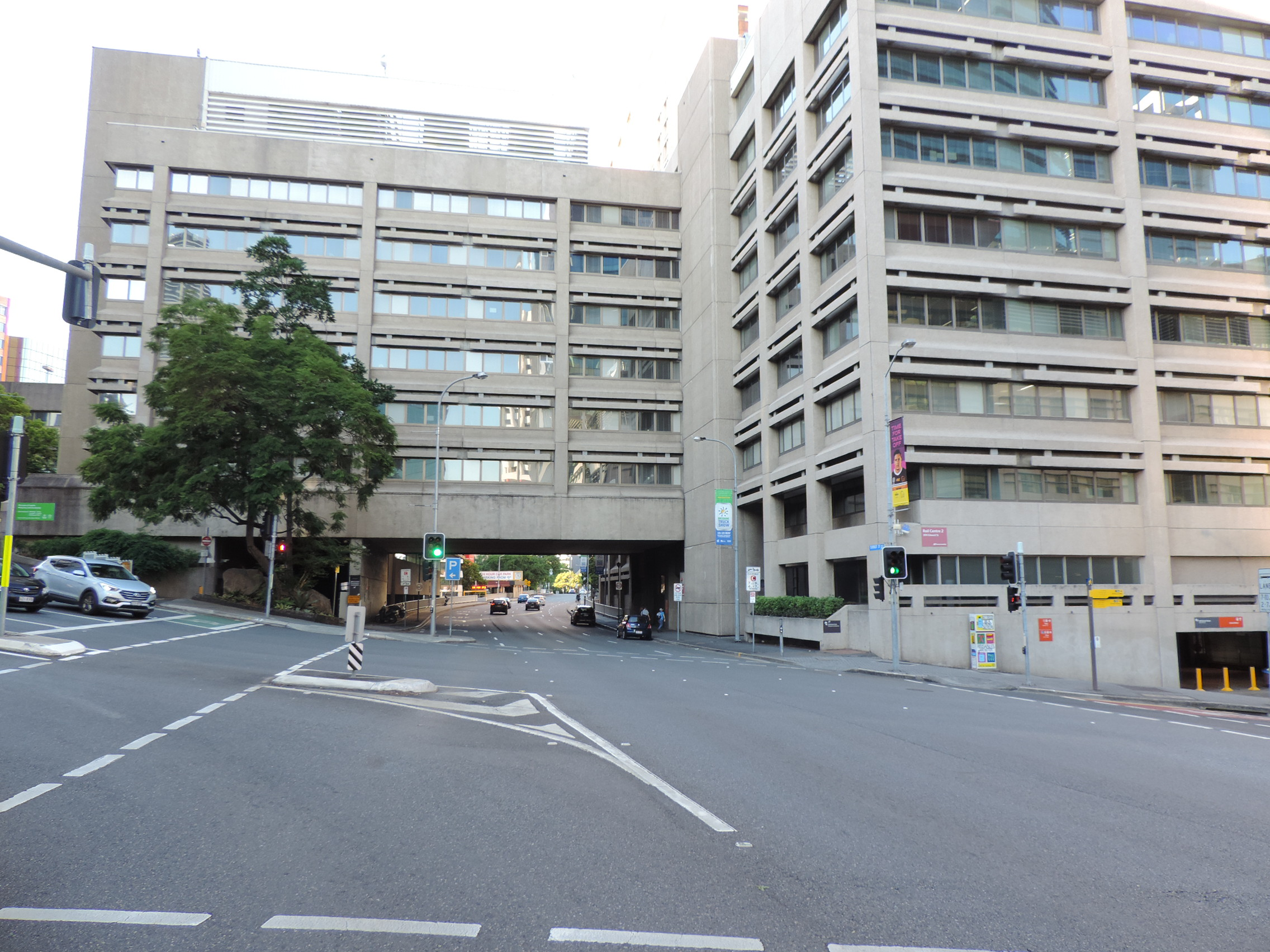
Rail Centre 2 Plaza building spanning Turbot Street, 2019

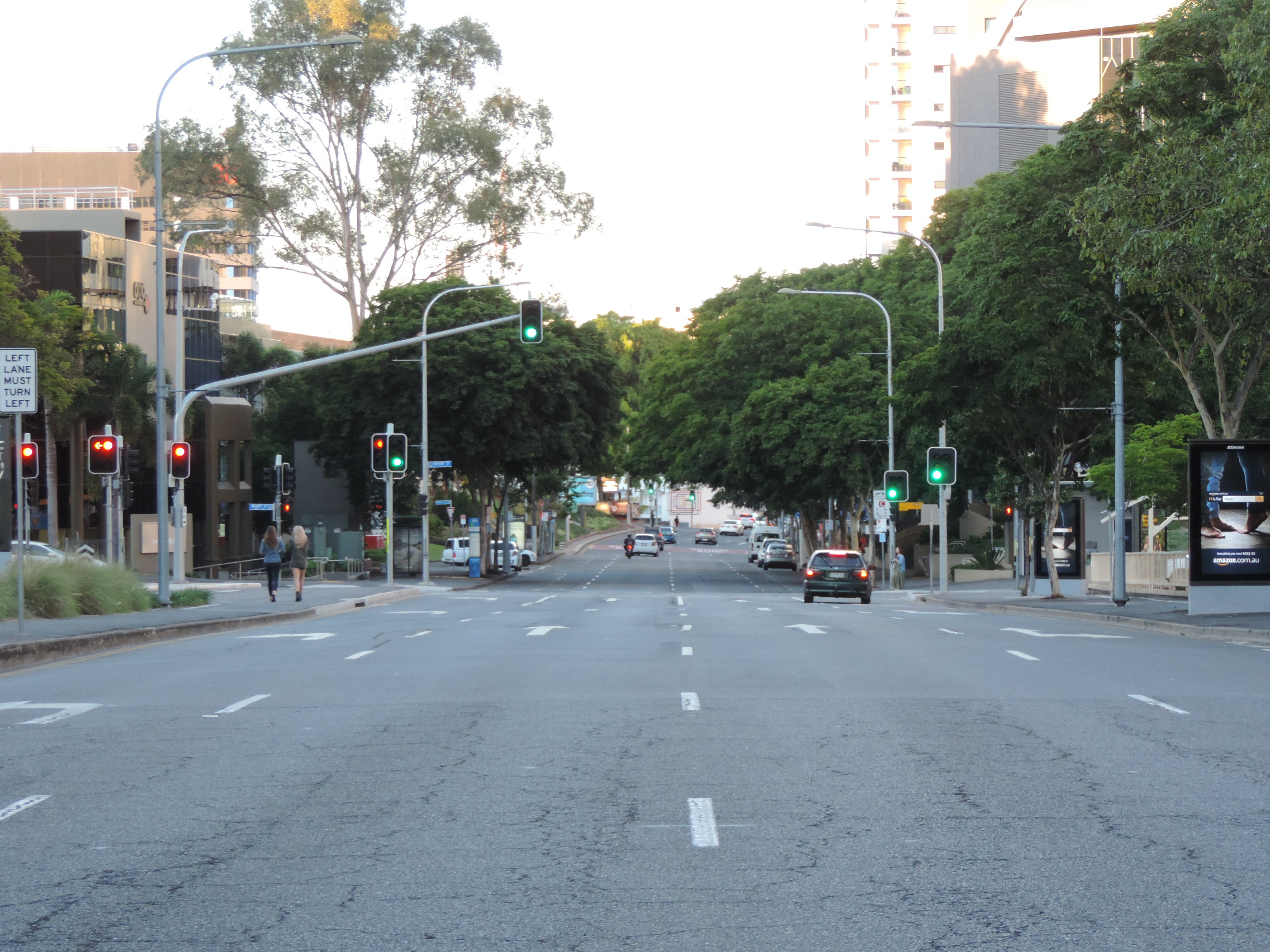
Looking east towards Fortitude Valley, 2019

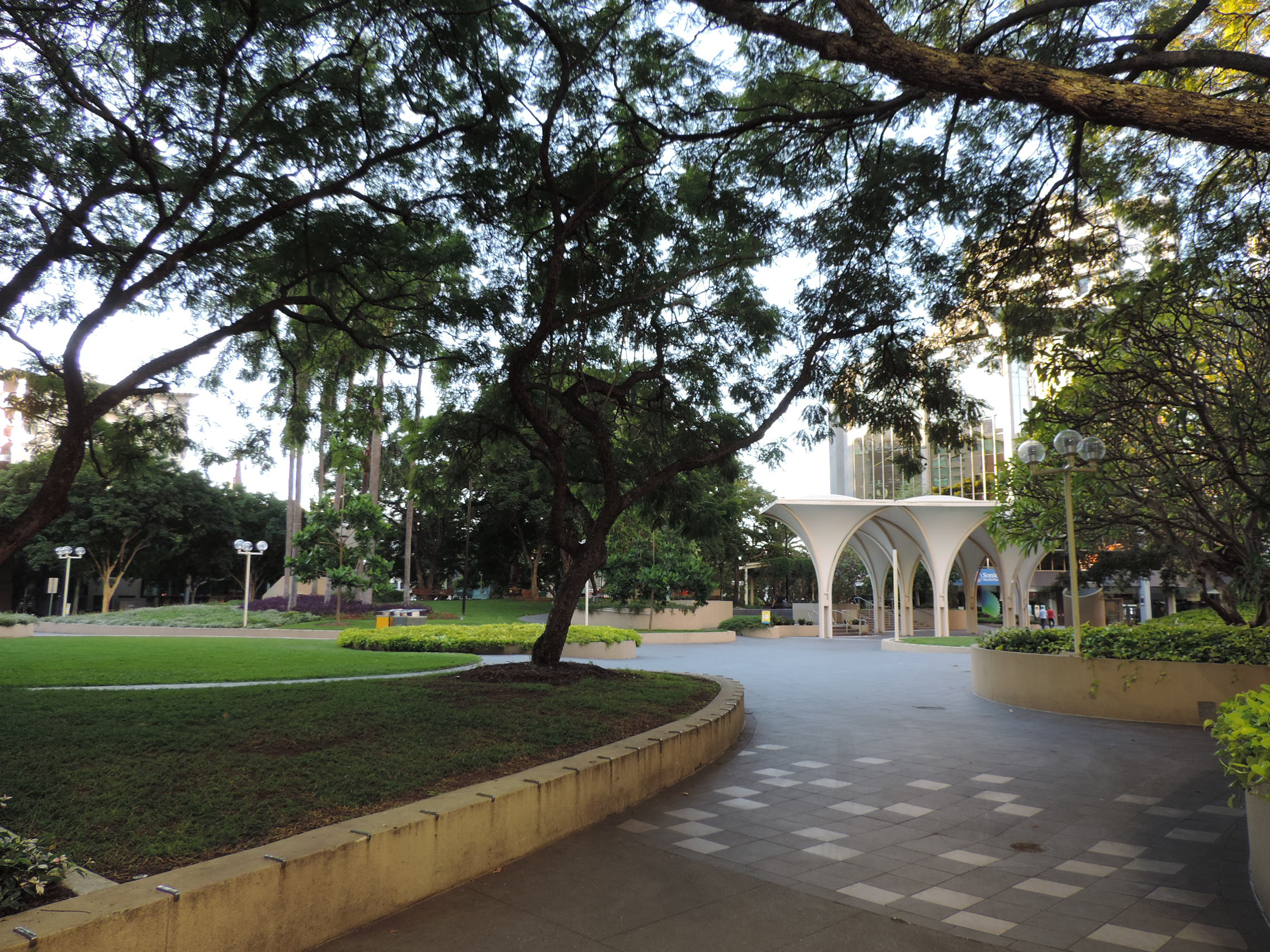
Cathedral Square, 2019

== See also ==
- Road transport in Brisbane
