= Jacob's Ladder, Brisbane =

Stairway in Queensland, Australia

Coordinates: 27.4656°S 153.0242°E

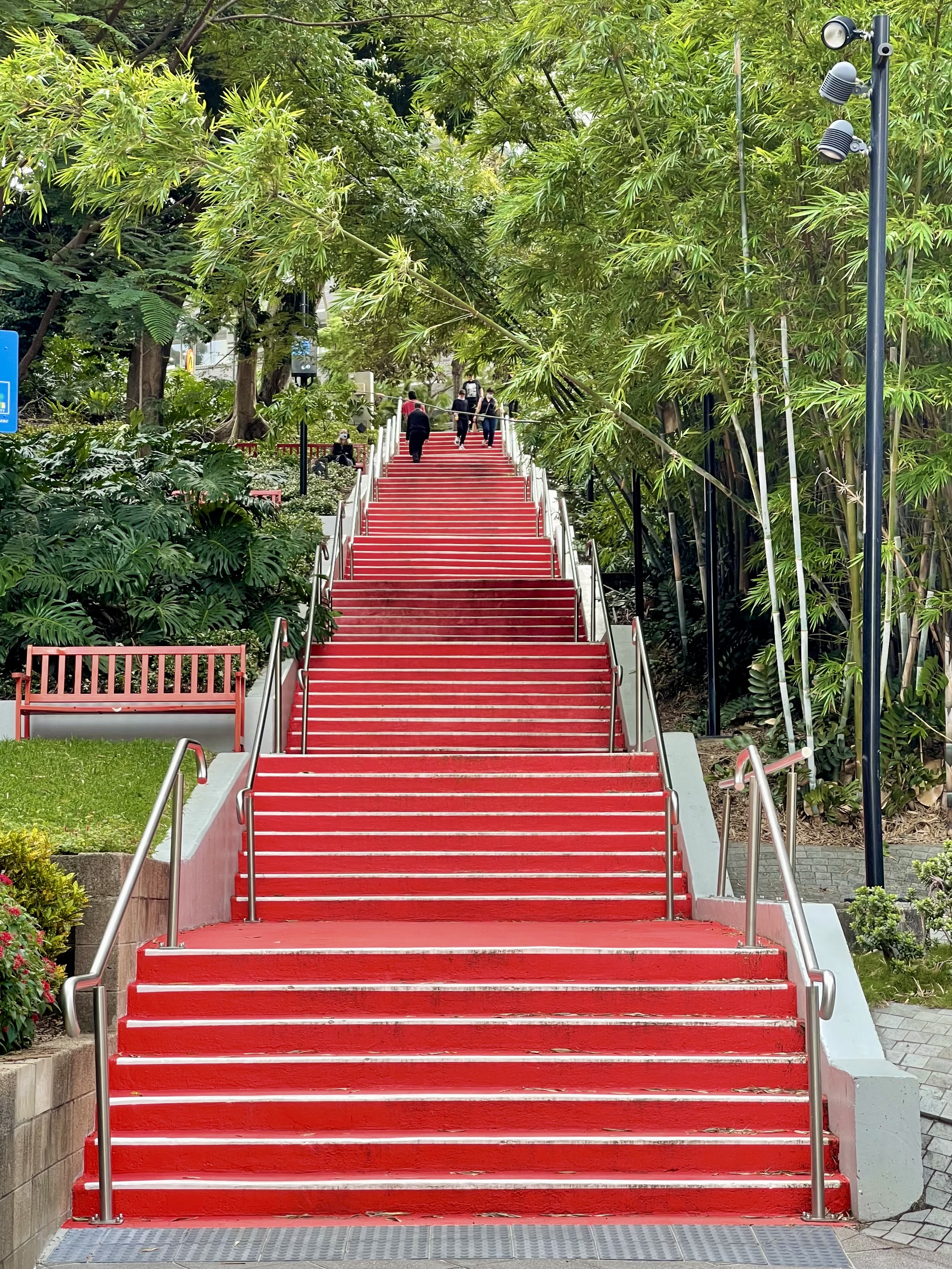
Jacob's Ladder, Brisbane, 2021

Jacob's Ladder is a landmark in Brisbane, Queensland, Australia. It is a long pedestrian staircase that extends from Edward and Turbot Streets up to Wickham Terrace. The name is a reference to the Biblical stairway ascending to Heaven. Jacob's Ladder has 86 steps.

== Geography ==
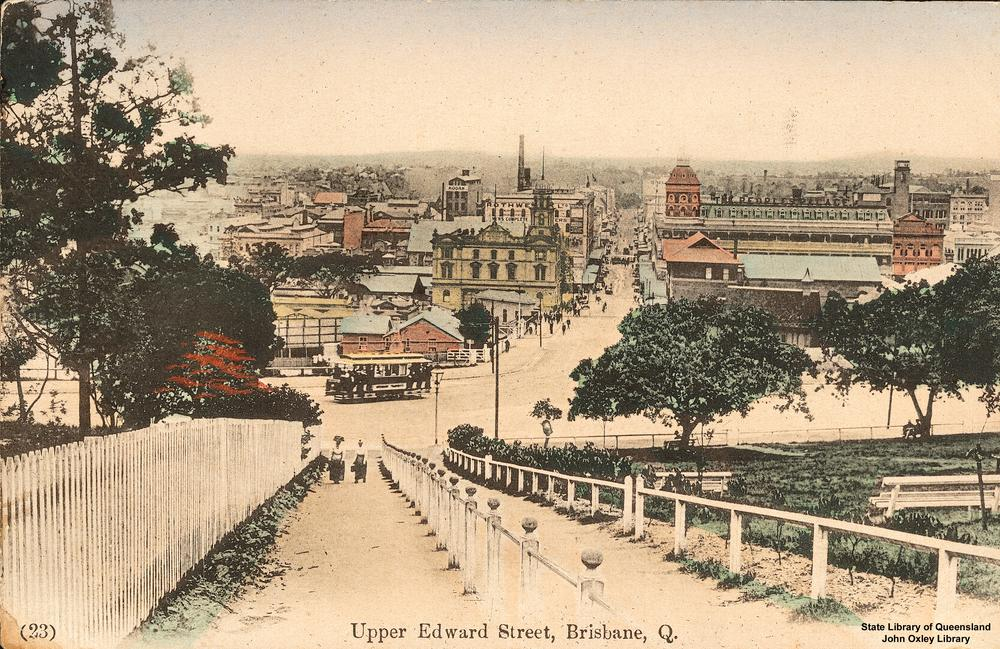
Jacob's Ladder, King Edward Park, Brisbane, March 1915

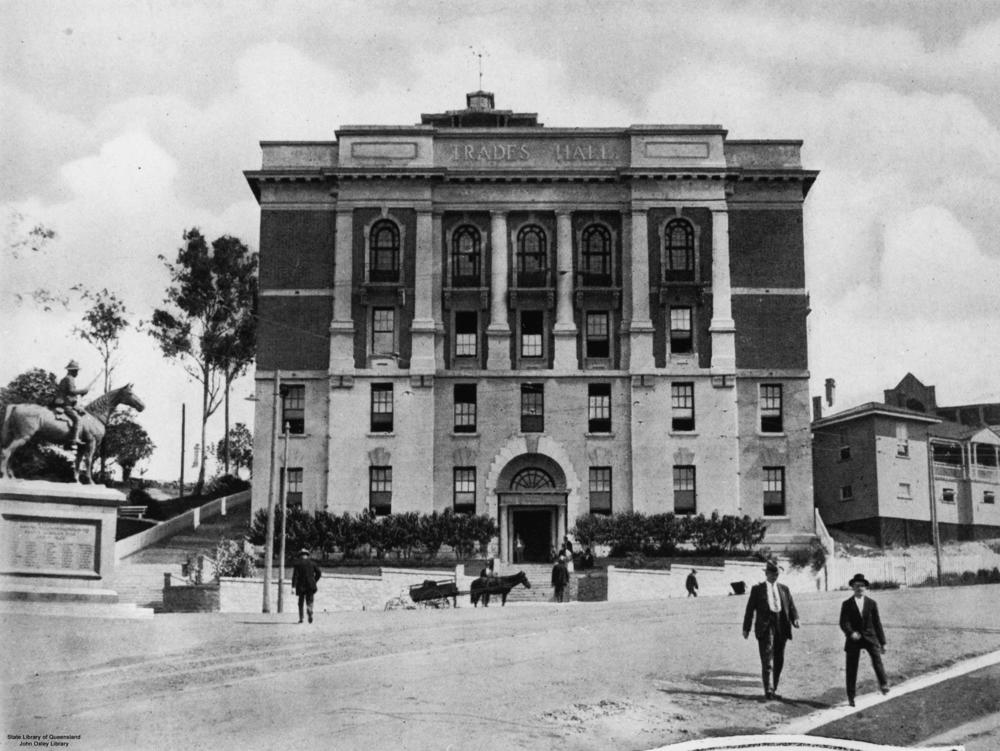
Jacob's Ladder to the left of Trades Hall, circa 1928

Jacob's Ladder is within King Edward Park and provides the shortest but steepest pedestrian access from the Brisbane central business district to Spring Hill on the escarpment above. It is on the boundary of the park separating it from an office tower on the north-east, formerly the site of the Brisbane Trades Hall (1891–1984).

== History ==
In 1895, Alderman James Hipwood made reference to:

That concrete water-tables and asphalt footpaths be laid on foot-path through reserve, leading from Wickham terrace to Turbot street;

This reserve owned by the State Government was one of several parcels of parkland including the Observatory reserve, and municipally owned Wickham Park.

It is unclear when Jacob's Ladder was recognised by that name, but there are references to its existence by that name from as early as 1897. This may have been about the same time as Turbot Street was extended from Albert Street east to Edward Street, as well as the relatively new Central railway station. The adjoining park reserve was known for its amorous couples by 1904. Poinsettias were to be planted alongside the steps in 1914 so the steps would 'be made bright'.

An unsuccessful attempt was made between 1918 and 1920, led by the Minister for Lands Harry Coyne but opposed by the municipal council, to resume the land so it may be added to the adjoining Trades Hall site. April 1922 saw representations to fully restore access to the steps following the trades hall construction.

In 1920, the concrete steps were built, with earlier photographs showing a steep pathway without steps. As part of demonstrating reliability captured by photograph by a newspaper, the steep stairs were driven the length by a Whippet motor car in March 1928. The 1930 request for a hill-climb test for a truck was rejected by the municipal council. An unattended car, from a Wickham Terrace surgery, careered down the stairs and down Edward Street towards Adelaide Street, resulting in the injury to one pedestrian.

In 1936, municipal parkland resumption was being considered between Albert and Edward Streets along Turbot Street, as far as Jacob's Ladder, for a new dental hospital, public library, and art gallery.
