= Women's boxing in Australia =

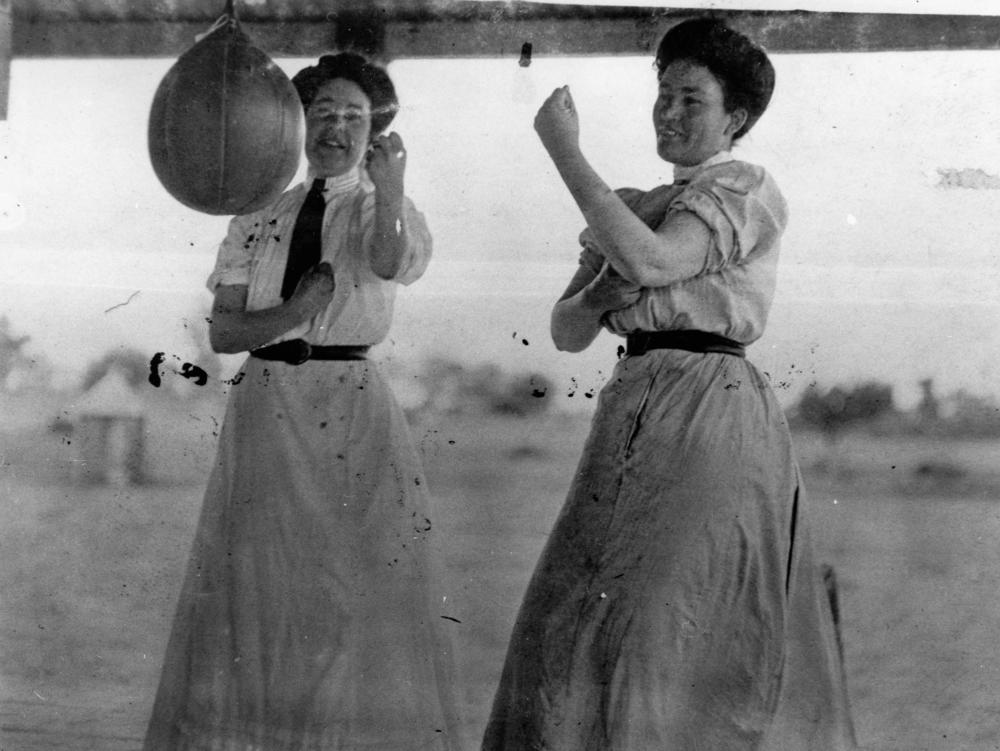
- Booka and Chris Durack sparring with a speed bag. The sisters are wearing long skirts and shirts with rolled up sleeves and no boxing gloves. The speed bag is attached to a timber beam in an open-sided building.
- Country: Australia
- National team: Australia

== History ==
While not being urged to avoid competition, women had few opportunities to compete in sport in Australia until the 1880s. After that date, new sporting facilities were being built around the country and many new sport clubs were created. Boxing classes were being offered to women in Australia by 1892, at locations such as the Brisbane Gymnasium on Turbot Street, close to the city's railway station. While classes may have been offered for women, serious training was not permitted for women by the 1900s and women were banned from pursuing the sport in a competitive way. Women were also barred from attending boxing matches. New South Wales banned women's boxing from 1986 to 2009. Women's boxing was resumed in NSW with an exhibition fight between Kaye Scott and Ramona Stephenson in October 2009. Women's boxing was legalized in Queensland in 2000.

== Culture ==
Female boxers in Australia have historically faced problems with acceptance of their involvement in the sport. In many places, they have been unable to find places to train and faced difficulties with the law prohibiting them from competing. In 2005, a PhD student in Australia was doing research on the history of women's boxing in the country.

== Competitions ==
In 2002, Desi Kontos of South Australia became the first Australian woman to represent the country at the boxing world championships.

In 2008, several national championships happened in Australia for women. These events were held in July in Melbourne and included the Australian Under 17 Women's Championships, Australian Senior Women's Championships and the Australian Women's Championships Medal Winners. In 2008, the women's national championships were unable to be held alongside the men's because women's boxing was illegal in New South Wales.

The Australian 2010 Women's World Championships 75 kg Selection Trial were held from 3–4 July in Canberra.

The Australian World Elite and Junior Teams Selection Trials were held from 27 to 29 March in 2009 in Port Adelaide.

Naomi Fischer-Rasmussen was the first female boxer to represent Australia at the Olympics when she competed at the 2012 Summer Olympics.

Caitlin Parker became the first Australian female boxer to win an Olympic medal when she won bronze at the 2024 Summer Olympics.

== Notable women fighters ==
- Louisa Hawton
- Erin McGowan
- Sharon Anyos
- Susie Ramadan
- Diana Prazak
- Deanha Hobbs

== See also ==
- Boxing

== Bibliography ==
- Howell, Max; Howell, Reet; Brown, David W. (1989). The Sporting Image, A pictorial history of Queenslanders at play. Brisbane: University of Queensland Press. ISBN 0-7022-2206-2.
