= BAFS Building =

Heritage-listed pharmacy building in Brisbane, Queensland

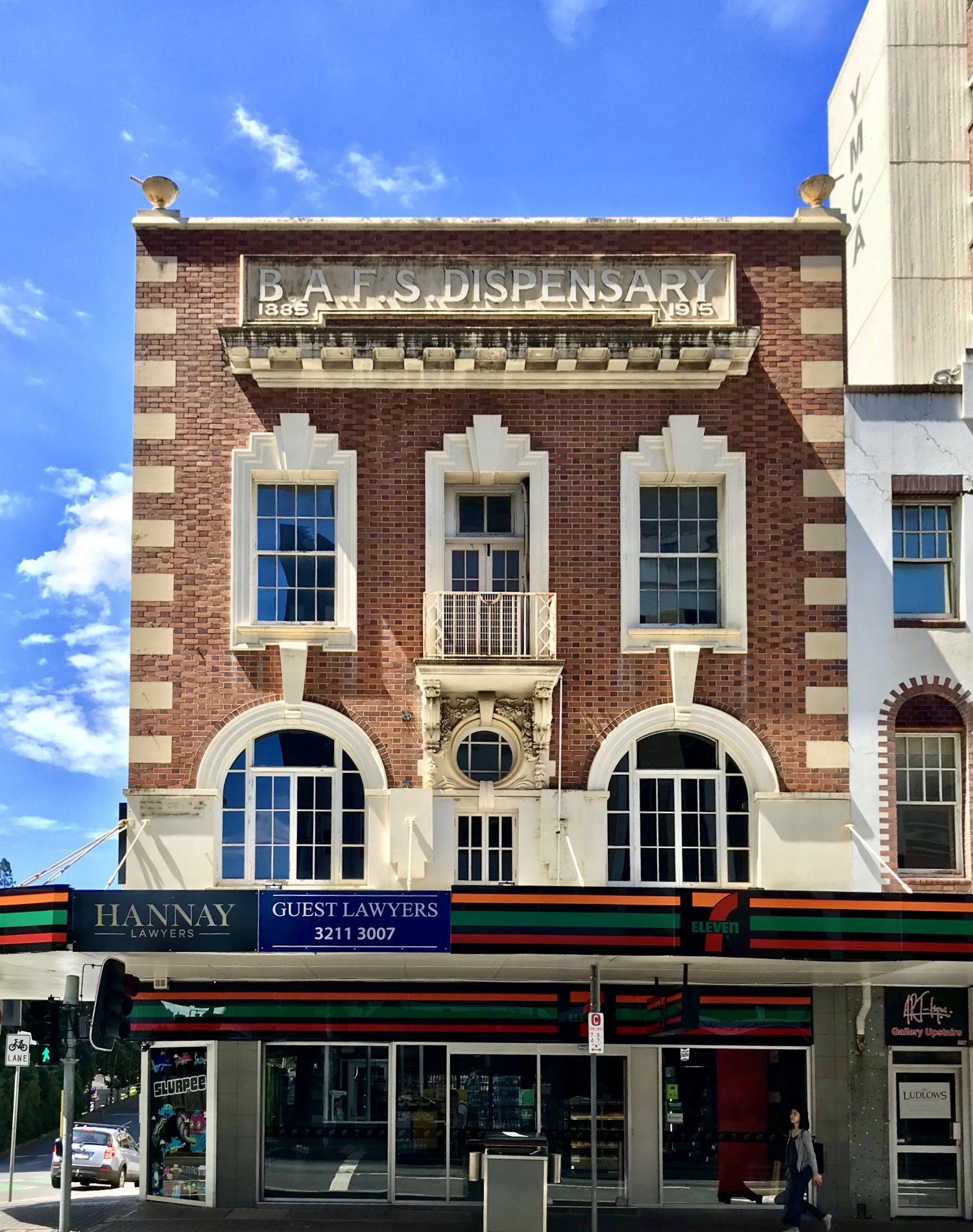
- BAFS Building, George Street facade, 2018

- Location within Queensland Location within Australia
- 27.4686°S 153.0216°E
- Location: 331 & 333 George Street, Brisbane City, City of Brisbane, Queensland, Australia

History
- Design period: 1914–1919 (World War I)
- Built: 1915–1916

Site notes
- Architect: Lange Leopold Powell
- Architectural style: Classicism

Queensland Heritage Register
- Official name: BAFS Building
- Type: state heritage (built)
- Designated: 22 February 2002
- Reference no.: 601825
- Significant period: 1915–1916 (fabric); 1916–ongoing (social)
- Significant components: strong room, hall, office/s
- Builders: B Cunningham

BAFS Building is a heritage-listed former pharmacy at 331 & 333 George Street, Brisbane City, City of Brisbane, Queensland, Australia. It was designed by Lange Leopold Powell and built from 1915 to 1916 by B Cunningham. It was added to the Queensland Heritage Register on 22 February 2002.

== History ==
The Brisbane Associated Friendly Societies' (BAFS) Building was officially opened in 1916 as a pharmaceutical dispensary and headquarters of the Brisbane Associated Friendly Societies. The building is located on the corner of George and Turbot Streets in Brisbane city and was designed by the notable local architectural firm, Chambers and Powell. It was the fourth city building occupied by the BAFS and the first that the society constructed themselves. The BAFS has had a presence in Brisbane city since 1885. A focal point for friendly societies throughout Queensland and the thousands of members they served, BAFS was an important force in health care in Queensland up to the mid twentieth century.

Queensland's first friendly society was established in 1843, members paid a monthly fee and were then entitled to claim sick and funeral benefits as necessary. Friendly Societies had emerged in Britain in the late eighteenth century as the country industrialised and a new class of urban worker emerged. Originally formed with the purpose of organising recreational activities for city workers, Friendly Societies soon grew into self-help organisations where members pooled their resources and helped each other out in times of need.

During the 1860s, membership of Friendly Societies flourished in Australia and the Societies expanded their services, contracting doctors to provide consultations to their members and beginning to provide free medicines. The medical fraternity became increasingly alarmed at the expansion of Friendly Societies and the threat they perceived to their profession. In response, the Societies amalgamated further, with the aim of providing even more comprehensive services. They aimed to offer greater choice of doctors and services, in premises they owned themselves. Pharmacists were less "protectionist" than doctors and Associated Friendly Societies (AFS) dispensaries were established throughout the capital cities of Australia.

The first BAFS dispensary was set up on 1 January 1885 in a small room in the Oddfellows Hall in Charlotte Street. At this time, the BAFS had 1200 members and incorporated nineteen Lodges. In 1893, a South Brisbane dispensary was opened by the BAFS. The next year the city dispensary moved to designated premises at 217 Queen Street. The dispensary stayed there until 1905 when it moved again to 344 Queen Street, in one of the premier retail blocks in the city.

In 1909, the BAFS celebrated its Silver Jubilee, its membership was 7185 and it now incorporated 100 Lodges. The same year, they established their third dispensary in Fortitude Valley. At the Annual Meeting in February 1915, it was reported that the membership had reached a total of 13,000 and that the property on George Street had been secured at the cost of £4080 for the purposes of building their own premises. A prospectus was prepared and sent out to all member Lodges, inviting them to support the building project through a debenture scheme. Debentures worth £12,000 were issued, the response from the Lodges was overwhelming and the amount was oversubscribed. Chambers and Powell Architects were commissioned to design the building and the Foundation Stone was laid on 4 September 1915.

Lange Powell was the designer of the building as his partner Claude Chambers had moved to Sydney in 1915. Powell responded to the toast to "The Architects and Builders" at the opening ceremony. Powell went on to do further architectural work for the BAFS, such as re-furbishing the building they purchased in 1919 at 146 Wickham Street, Fortitude Valley. Powell was an eclectic architect who understood well the design canons of the styles of the Interwar period. The best known of his surviving city buildings demonstrate considerable stylistic literacy, for example, the Ann Street Masonic Temple in Ancient Classical style and St Martins Hospital in Arts and Crafts style. The design of the BAFS Building has stylistic similarities, albeit on a smaller scale, with other examples of his commercial work in the city, such as Perry House, Preston House and Exton House.

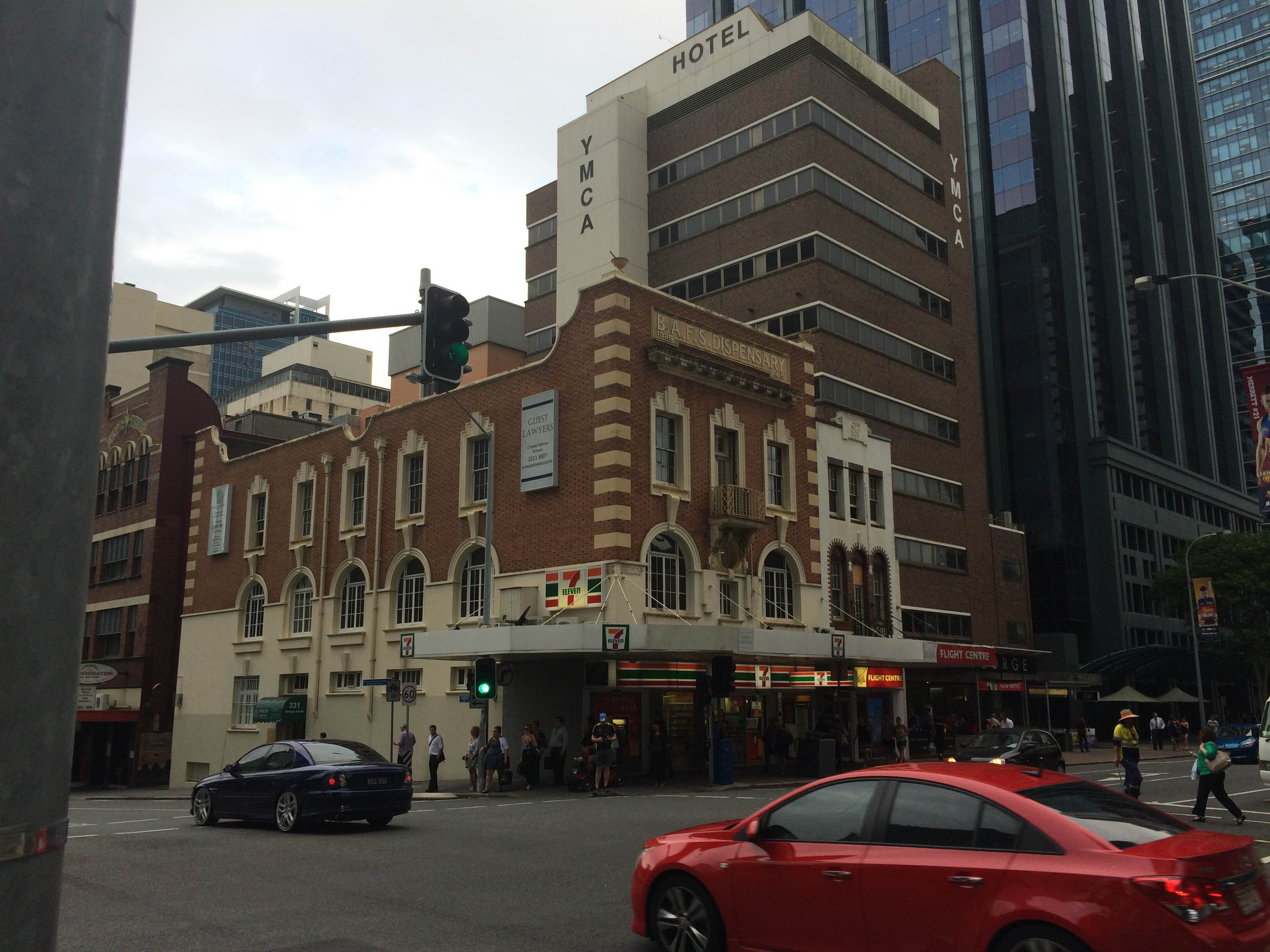
Brisbane Associated Friendly Societies (BAFS) Building, corner of George and Turbots Streets, 2015

The George Street building was designed as a "head dispensary", intended to showcase the success and progress of the BAFS. The inscription of "1885-1916" on the George Street facade clearly reflected the Society's desire to maintain links with their history in Brisbane. A souvenir booklet written in 1916 claimed "it stands as a monument to the enterprise and progressiveness of the Associated Friendly Societies and is an acquisition to the architecture of George Street and the city, generally". The building had three floors and a basement, the whole of the ground floor, at street level, was occupied by the dispensary, the first floor accommodated offices for lease and the third floor contained two large rooms for use for meetings by the Board of Management and Lodges. The building, constructed by B Cunningham, had been completed at a cost of £11,707/15/7.

By the 1920s, the battle that had been raging between doctors and Lodges over who should control medical care had been largely won by the doctors due to the formidable fight waged by the British Medical Association - a dispute that had consequences across Australia. The BAFS Medical Institute, a collection of doctors who worked for the BAFS management committee considered amalgamating with the dispensaries but did not, effectively ending the connection doctors had with the BAFS.

Dispensaries, however, continued to flourish and the 1920s was characterised by strong growth. BAFS purchased their own premises in Fortitude Valley and South Brisbane; however George Street attracted over half of the total sales and over 60% of the total number of prescriptions for most of the decade. The interwar years were the "golden age" for the BAFS. The building was a hub of Lodge activity, the shops and offices of the "BAFS Chambers" were constantly let and included tenants such as a milliner, a masseuse and a car hire firm. There was also an Honorary Dentist and Honorary Optician who were paid a salary by BAFS and provided free services to members until at least 1940. One half of the top floor was used as a hall by Lodges who did not have their own premises, as well as for BAFS annual and quarterly meetings and a variety of social events such as smoke concerts.

The BAFS is now known as FriendlyCare Pharmacy and has pharmacies in six locations across Brisbane, Ipswich, and Gold Coast. The head office of the Society is no longer at George Street, and both the Fortitude Valley and Woolloongabba premises have been sold. The ground floor is mostly occupied by a convenience store.

== Description ==
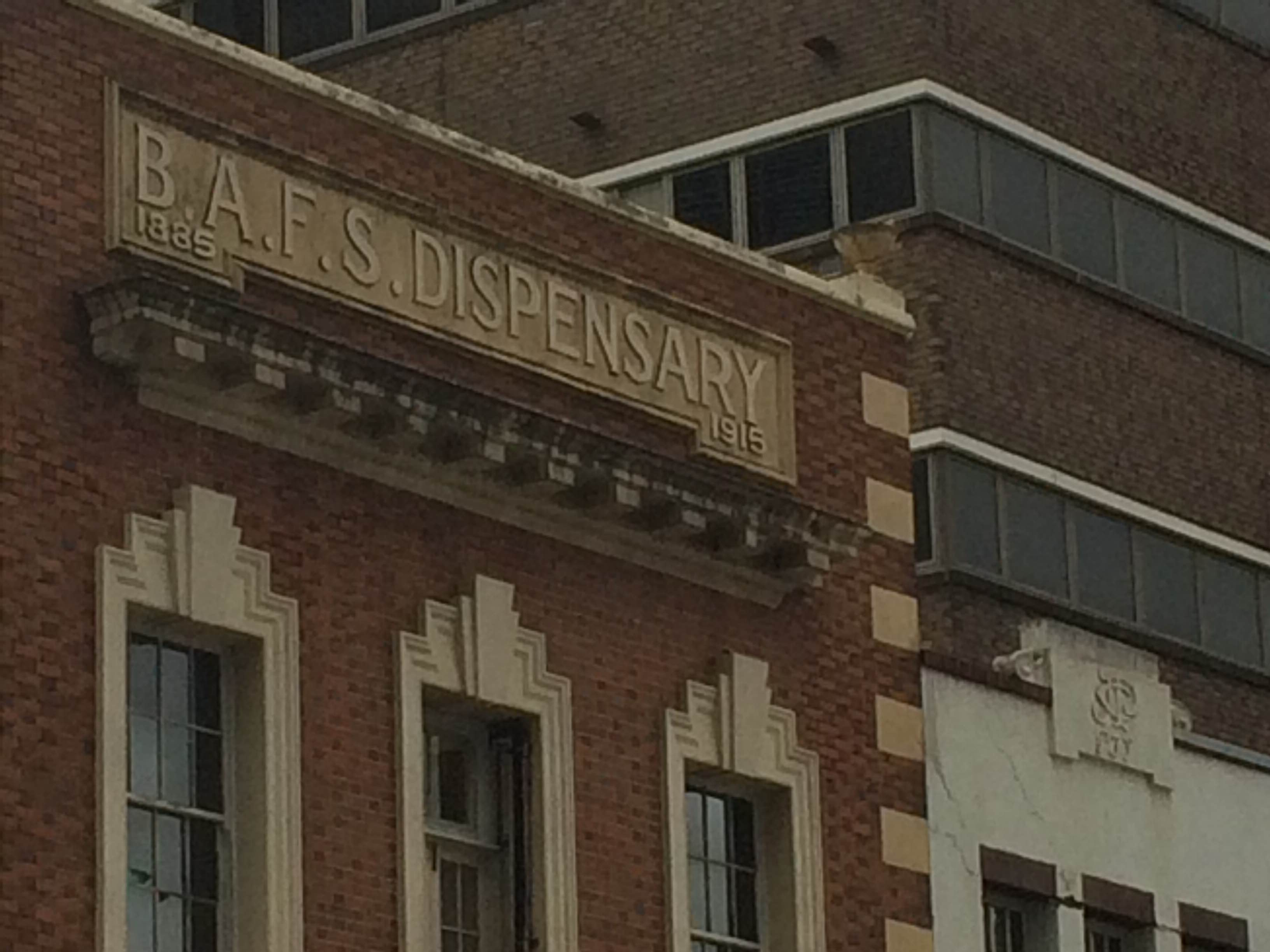
Brisbane Associated Friendly Societies (BAFS) Building, lettering and mortar-and-pestle detail, 2015

The BAFS Building is a three-storey building with basement, constructed of load-bearing masonry that accommodates a pharmacy and offices. The building has sculptured, parapetted facades to both George and Turbot Streets which feature carefully detailed Classical and Art Deco-style decorative elements. The bottom half of the building is smooth-rendered and painted in a cream colour, which is also used on the mouldings around the windows and in bands on the corners of the building to simulate quoining. The first floor windows are set within wide arched openings which have exaggerated moulded keystones that connect to the sills of the upper floor windows. The upper floor windows have moulded surrounds with Art Deco-style decoration at the top that comprises a stepped pattern around a central keystone. The first floor windows are multi-paned casements with arched heads and at upper level are multi-paned sashes, all have deep sills. Air conditioning units have been inserted into some of the first floor windows.

The George Street facade is symmetrically composed, with a central feature at upper level of a small balcony supported on corbels with a wrought iron balustrade. A pair of French doors, surmounted by a fanlight, open out on to this balcony. A round window decorated with festoons is directly below the balcony, followed by another small square window directly below this. A sign is located at the top of the facade, with the raised lettering "B.A.F.S Dispensary 1885-1915" The sign sits upon a short and simple entablature with prominent dentils. Mortar and pestles are mounted at each corner of the facade.

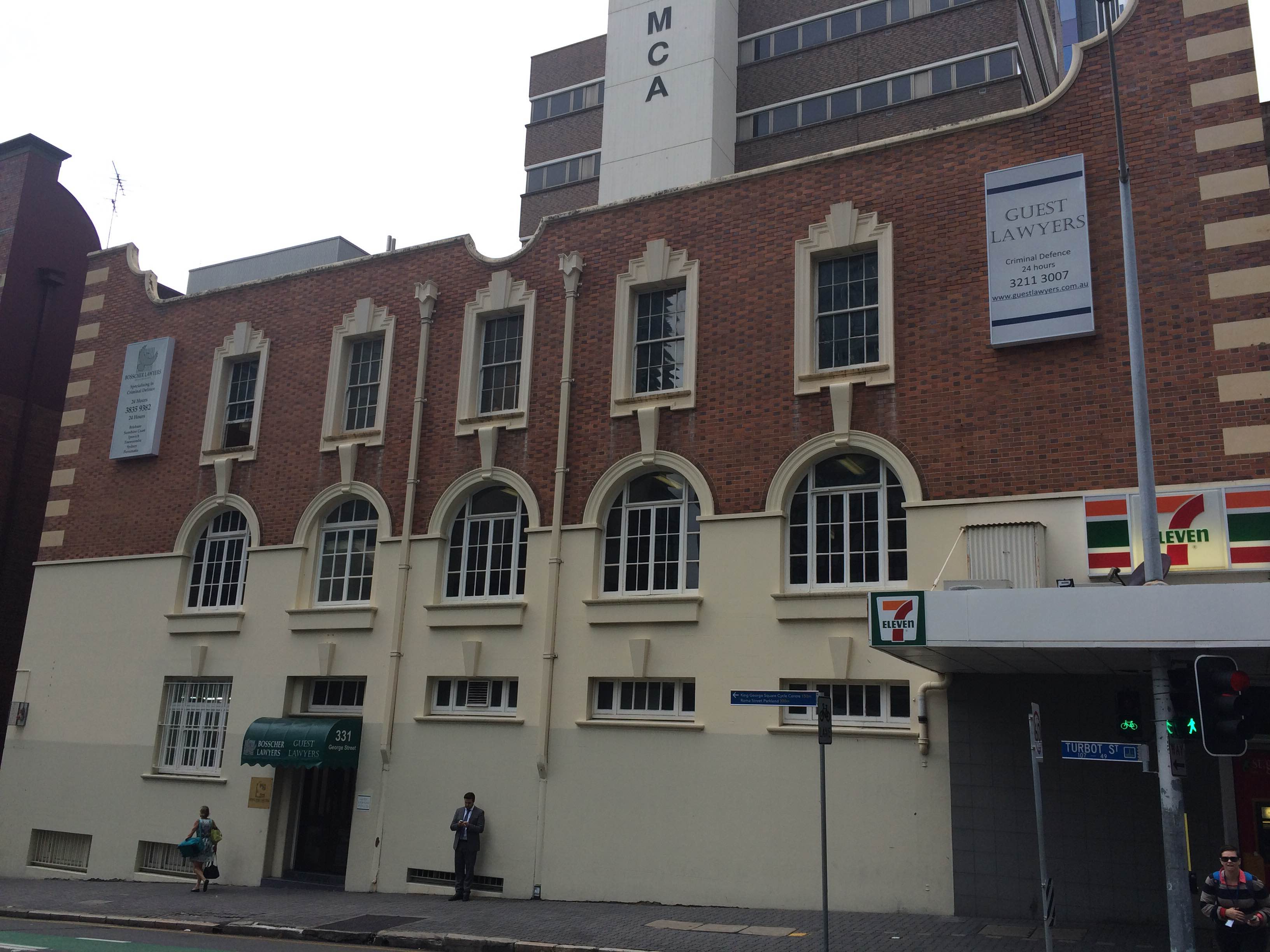
Brisbane Associated Friendly Societies (BAFS) Building, Turbot Street facade, 2015

The Turbot Street elevation is more simple but also has a high degree of symmetry. The corners of the parapet are stepped and scalloped and there is a central semi-circular cut-out in the centre of the parapet. There are three horizontal bands of five windows, at street level they are high level narrow horizontal windows. Two downpipes with prominent rainwater heads are located either side of the central window and the entrance door is located off-centre beneath the second last line of windows, towards the back lane.

The pharmacy is located at street level with a recent shopfront of sliding glass doors to George Street. A deep awning returns around the corner a short distance into Turbot Street and is supported by iron tie-back rods. A doorway situated within the chamfered corner at street level, is no longer used. The Turbot Street elevation follows the slope of the street and a service laneway is located at the rear of the building. The slightly recessed entrance to the offices (BAFS Chambers) leads to a small vestibule and concrete stairwell providing access to the upper floors. The open well stair with two quarter landings has cast iron newel posts, timber balusters and a curved timber hand rail. A doorway from the back of the pharmacy also opens into the stairwell.

The enlarged landing of the staircase serves as an anteroom for the first floor offices, adjacent to this is an external light well. An arched doorway leads to a hallway on the left that provides access to the BAFS offices and a small barbershop. The hallway terminates in large double doors that facilitate loading from the rear laneway, a similar loading area is also located at the top floor. A kitchenette and toilets are located in the north-east corner of the building and have some original fittings. The hallway to the right leads to the BAFS Boardroom and several offices, some of which are occupied by doctors and others which are vacant. Partitions in this area are generally fibro-cement sheeting with simple timber joinery and glass in the upper third section of wall There are some suspended tiled ceilings and timber floors are carpeted throughout.

The northern end of the upper floor of the building has a similar floor plan to the first floor and contains offices and toilet and kitchen facilities. The former hall is located at the southern end. This is a large, well-lit, uncluttered space with an open ceiling with timber trusses and polished timber floorboards. French doors lead to the small balcony overlooking George Street. The upper floor is currently leased by a modelling agency who have fitted a reception area at the top of the stairwell.

The basement is accessed from an area at the back of the pharmacy which also contains an office, kitchenette, loading dock and large general storage area. The basement occupies the entire space of the ground floor and is partially subterranean. There is a regular pattern of columns and rows of storage shelves. A vault where medicines and pharmaceutical materials were previously stored is located in the space underneath the upper stairwell. Toilets are located in the north-east corner with a loading area adjacent.

== Heritage listing ==
BAFS Building was listed on the Queensland Heritage Register on 22 February 2002 having satisfied the following criteria.

The place is important in demonstrating the evolution or pattern of Queensland's history.

The BAFS Building is important in demonstrating the evolution of Queensland's history, representing the development of and changes in, the provision of health care in the nineteenth and twentieth centuries in Queensland. It demonstrates the growth and popularity of Friendly Societies as a means for working-class people to provide for their health needs, prior to the development of Government welfare and health care.

The place demonstrates rare, uncommon or endangered aspects of Queensland's cultural heritage.

The BAFS Building demonstrates rare aspects of Queensland's cultural heritage, being surviving purpose-built premises constructed by an association of Friendly Societies to accommodate a diverse range of their activities.

The place is important because of its aesthetic significance.

The BAFS Building is important because of its aesthetic significance, designed by prominent interwar Brisbane architect Lange Powell and demonstrating a high degree of design accomplishment. The building's carefully designed facades make a contribution to the streetscapes of both George and Turbot Streets.

The place has a strong or special association with a particular community or cultural group for social, cultural or spiritual reasons.

The BAFS Building has a strong and special association with Brisbane Associated Friendly Societies for social and cultural reasons. The construction of the building represented a high point in the efforts and success of the BAFS and it was a civic icon in Brisbane for many years, renowned in Queensland as a source of competitively priced and high quality drugs. The building was a focus and gathering point for a large number of Friendly Societies and their members, used for meetings and social occasions.
