= Brisbane Trades Hall =

Former building in Brisbane, Queensland

Brisbane Trades Hall is a title given to two Trades Hall buildings in Brisbane, Queensland, Australia. The first trades hall was constructed on Turbot Street in 1891, before land resumption forced the Trades and Labor Council to move the hall to Upper Edward Street in 1920. The second trades hall building was demolished and redeveloped in 1984.

== First Trades Hall ==
The foundation stone of the original trades hall in Turbot Street, Brisbane, was laid on 4 April 1891 by Sir Charles Lilley. There was a procession of unionists from Ann Street, along Queen Street and then up Edward Street to the building site. However, by the 1920s, a larger building was needed as the labour movement had succeeding in unionising about two-thirds of the workforce.

Following on from the extension of the railway line and tunnel underway from Roma Street in 1889 to Central Station, concern with the weight of the first Trades Hall over the tunnel resulted in land resumption, with a new site selected at Upper Edward Street.

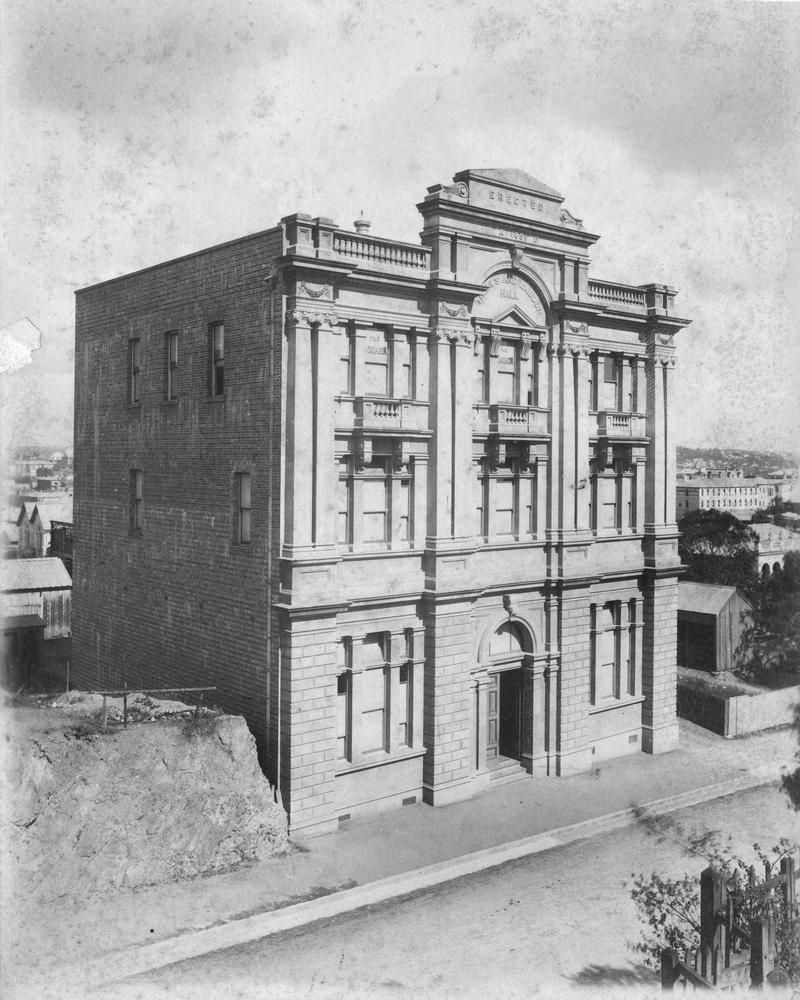
Brisbane's first Trades and Labour Hall building shortly after construction, 1891

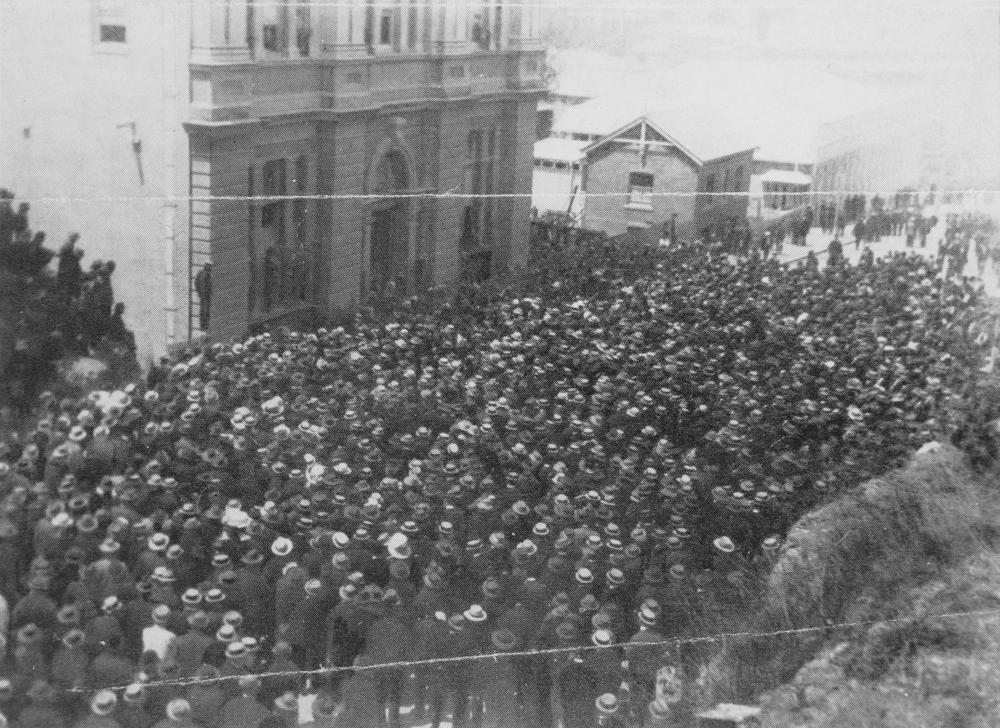
Union members outside Brisbane Trades Hall during the 1912 Brisbane general strike

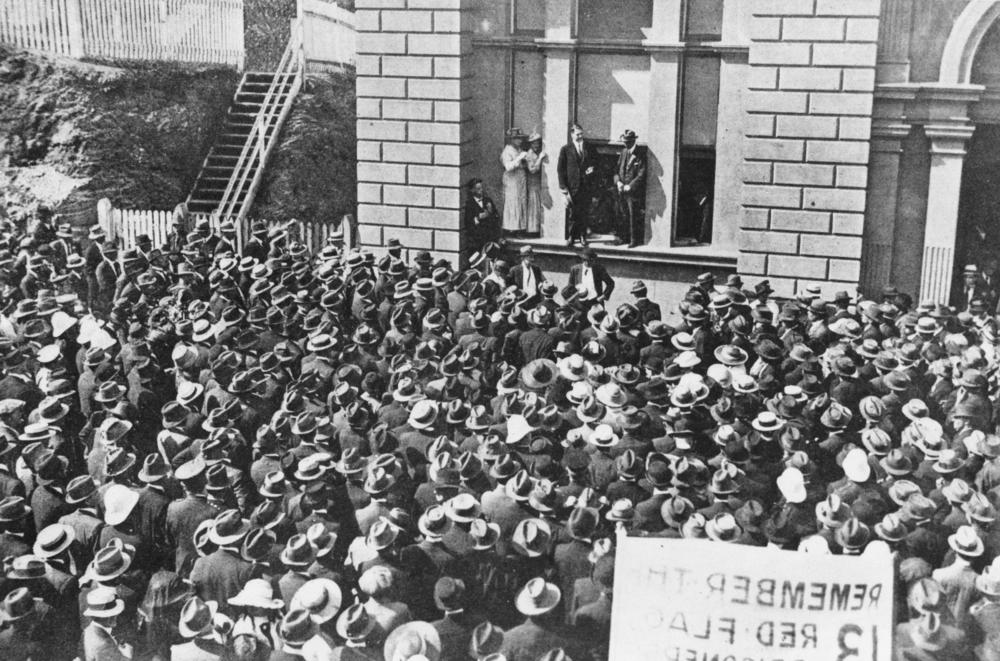
Labor premier Ted Theodore addressing union members outside Trades Hall, 1919

== Second Trades Hall ==
The foundation stone of the second trades hall was laid on 1 May 1920 by the Queensland Lieutenant-Governor William Lennon. The site was on Turbot Street looking down Edward Street, adjacent to Jacob's Ladder.

The building was used by the Queensland trade union movement for meetings, offices, social and educational events, and is the location of the Trades and Labour Council, now known as the Queensland Council of Unions. In the late 1960s, part of the building housed the FOCO club and bookshop, where the group Society for Democratic Action (SDA) met.

In 1984 the Trades and Labour Council, as the board of management, sold the property and moved to a new property at Peel Street in South Brisbane, known as the TLC Building. As the original property was granted for the specific purpose of being used as a Trades Hall, the Brisbane Trades Hall Management Act 1984 was required to be passed authorising the transaction, with planning controls on the use of the original historic building.

The building was subsequently demolished and the site is now occupied by the high-rise IBM building.

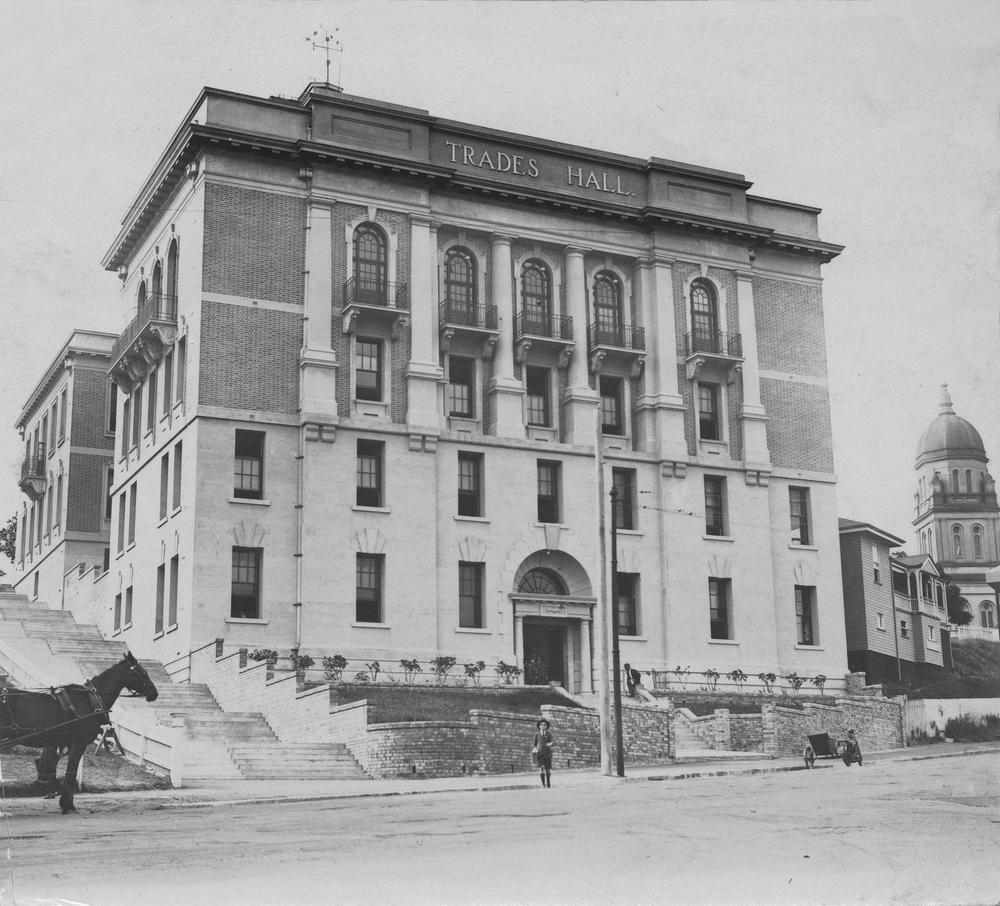
Brisbane Trades Hall, 1924

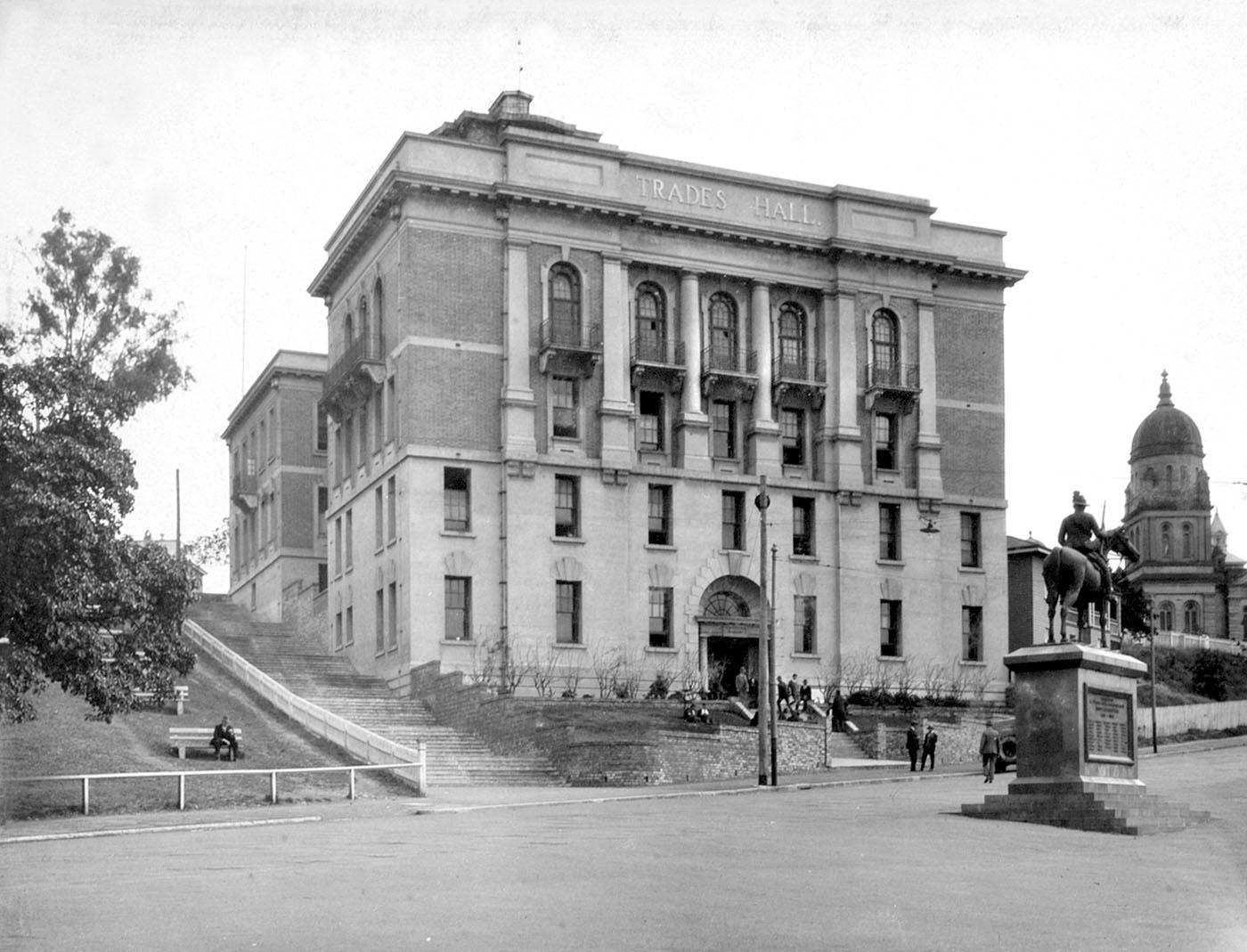
Brisbane Trades Hall, 1926

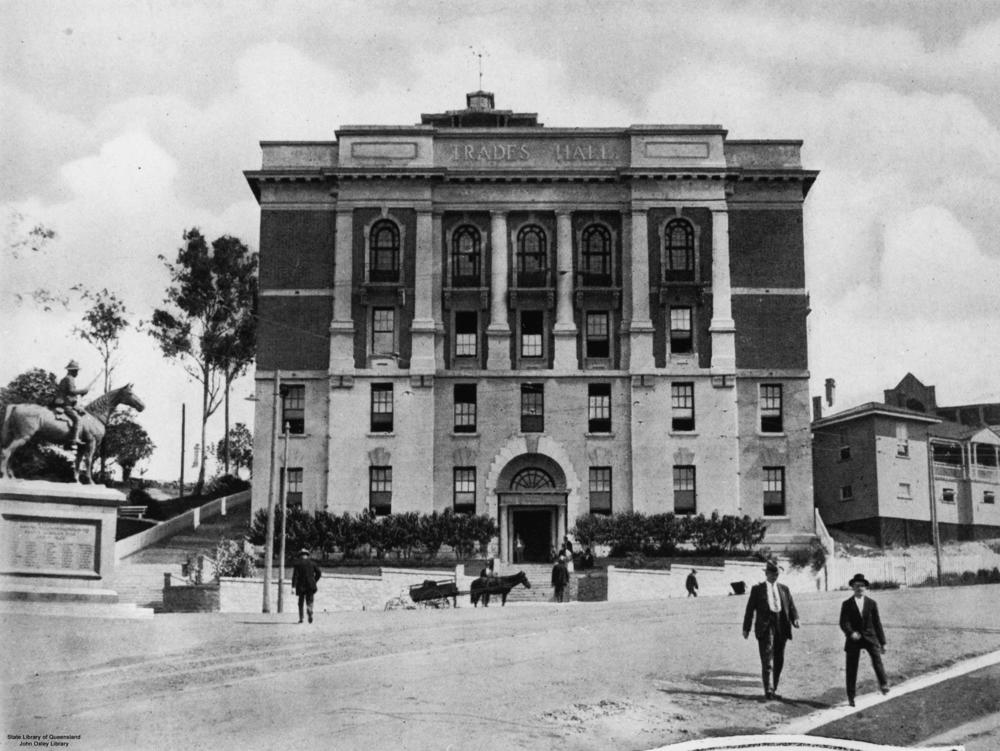
Brisbane Trades Hall, 1928

== TLC Building ==
Following the sale of the Trades Hall building on Upper Edward Street, the Trades and Labour Council moved to their new headquarters at 16 Peel Street, South Brisbane. Their new building, the TLC Building, is a 5 floor commercial-style office building and does not contain a traditional grand meeting hall.

16 Peel Street is owned by the former Trades and Labour Council (known as the Queensland Council of Unions since 1993), and has several additional tenants, including:

- The Queensland branch of the Australian Labor Party | Level 1
- Young Workers Hub | Level 2
- St Mary's Community South Brisbane | Level 2
- Safe Work College | Level 2
- Refugee and Immigration Legal Service | Level 3
- Media, Entertainment and Arts Alliance Queensland Branch | Level 3
- Youth Advocacy Centre | Level 4
- Professionals Australia Queensland Branch | Level 4

The Queensland Council of Unions offices are located on Level 5.

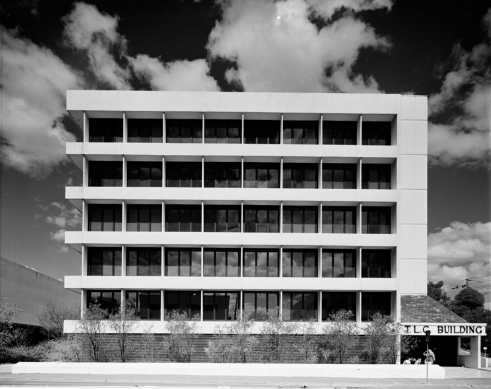
Front face of the TLC Building, South Brisbane, 1994

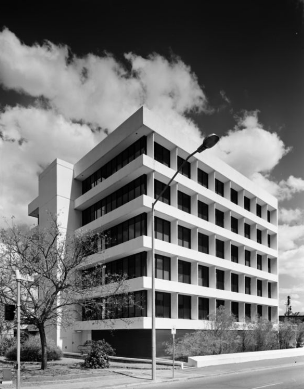
Eastern side of the TLC Building

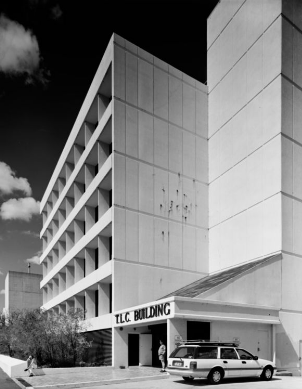
Western face of the TLC Building

== See also ==
- Victorian Trades Hall
- Adelaide Trades Hall
- Perth Trades Hall
- Sydney Trades Hall
