= Drill Shed, Fortitude Valley =

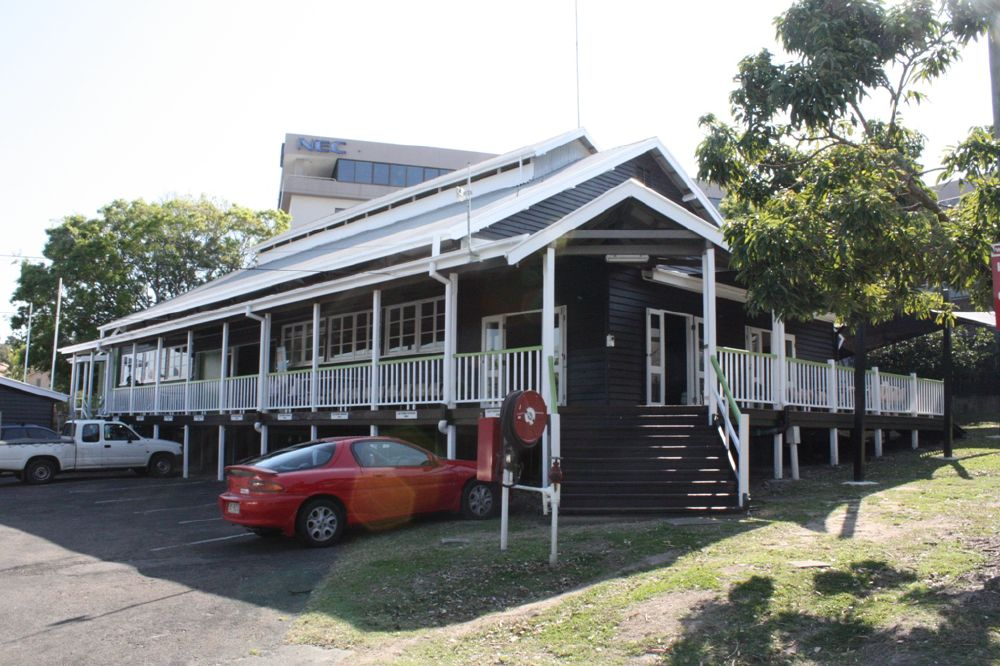

- Location within Queensland Location within Australia
- 27.4531°S 153.0302°E
- Location: 342 Water Street, Fortitude Valley, City of Brisbane, Queensland, Australia

History
- Design period: 1870s–1890s (late 19th century)
- Built: 1880s

Site notes
- Architect: John James Clark

Queensland Heritage Register
- Official name: Drill Shed, Caretaker's Cottage and Orderly Room (former), Water Street
- Type: state heritage (built)
- Designated: 2 December 2011
- Reference no.: 602797
- Significant period: 1880s–1980s
- Builders: William Watson

The Drill Shed is a heritage-listed drill shed at 342 Water Street, Fortitude Valley, City of Brisbane, Queensland, Australia. It was designed by John James Clark and built in the 1880s by William Watson. It was added to the Queensland Heritage Register on 2 December 2011.

== History ==
The large timber drill shed located between Water Street and Gregory Terrace, Fortitude Valley, was originally erected in 1884 in Boundary Street, Fortitude Valley, for infantry units of the Queensland Volunteer Force, prior to the creation of the Queensland Defence Force. The drill shed is the oldest known surviving drill shed in Queensland and the only one with a gable-roofed design. It is also the last survivor of Brisbane's pre-Federation drill sheds. It was transferred to the Commonwealth in 1901 and was moved to its current site in 1925, along with its adjacent timber caretaker's cottage and an orderly room built in 1885 for the Moreton Mounted Infantry. The orderly room was the core of an office building south of the drill shed until its twentieth century additions were demolished and the remaining structure moved next to the drill shed in 2013. As a group, the three colonial-era defence buildings are uncommon, and as a pair the drill shed and its accompanying cottage may be a unique surviving example in Queensland.

Upon separation from New South Wales in 1859 Queensland had no military defence, as Brisbane's British garrison (a detachment of the 11th Regiment) had been withdrawn in 1850. The first Governor of the new Colony of Queensland, Sir George Bowen, lobbied for a company of British regular soldiers, but it was not until January 1861 that Brisbane received a detachment of the 12th Regiment. A larger unit was not available until a company of the 50th Regiment arrived in October 1866, fresh from campaigning in southern Taranaki, New Zealand. A detachment of Royal Marines was also located at Somerset, Cape York Peninsula, from 1864 to 1867. The 50th Regiment departed Brisbane in March 1869, and the last of the British regiments left Australia in 1870.

During the 1860s the small number of British regular soldiers in Queensland was supplemented by local forces and Governor Bowen accepted the services of local volunteers in a number of Queensland towns from 1860. The Brisbane Troop, Queensland Mounted Rifles, existed from February 1860 to May 1863. Also in Brisbane, No. 1 and 2 Companies, Queensland Volunteer Rifle Brigade (QVRB) began training in September 1860 (disbanded in 1865). The Queensland Volunteer Artillery was gazetted in Brisbane in August 1862.

More units were raised in Brisbane in 1867, including the Brisbane Volunteer Rifle Corps (later "A" Company of the 1st Regiment of Queensland Infantry from June 1879, and then "A" Company of the 1st Queenslanders (or Moreton) Regiment from February 1885); and the Spring Hill and Fortitude Valley Rifle Corps, which later became "B" Company, 1st Queenslanders Regiment. No. 7 Company (South Brisbane) of the QVRB was raised in 1870, but only lasted until 1872.

The volunteers' training was supervised by members of the 50th Regiment during the late 1860s. However, limited interest and funding continued to hamper the volunteer movement until the late 1870s, when tensions between Britain and Russia raised concerns regarding the vulnerability of Britain's overseas colonies. Colonel Sir William Jervois of the Royal Engineers, assisted by Lieutenant-Colonel Peter Scratchley, toured the Australian colonies to make recommendations for defence arrangements and the pair visited Queensland in August 1877. In order to deal with the perceived Russian naval threat to Brisbane, they recommended small naval vessels, a coastal fort at Lytton (now Fort Lytton, built 1881), and a field force of infantry and engineers with artillery.

Another recommendation was to form a permanent staff to train the volunteers. The Volunteer Act 1878 established a permanent staff of officers and non-commissioned officers (NCOs), the latter to act as drill instructors, and a professional Commandant was appointed in April 1878. By 1880 the staff included 10 officers and six NCOs in Brisbane, plus two NCOs in Ipswich, and one each in Toowoomba, Warwick, Rockhampton and Maryborough.

During the late 1870s more volunteer units were formed in Queensland. In Brisbane these included the Queensland Rangers Volunteer Corps, No. 12 Company (1877); and "D" Company, formed in 1878 as part of the new Metropolitan Administrative Battalion (later part of the 1st Queenslanders). The Queensland Volunteer Artillery Brigade, formed in June 1879, included No.1 Battery Brisbane, No. 2 Battery Ipswich, No. 3 (Garrison) Battery Brisbane, and the Brisbane Engineers.

Jervois' defence scheme came closer to fruition in January 1882, when a Military Committee of Enquiry was appointed in Queensland. The committee recommended a mixed force, with a permanent staff based in Brisbane, a volunteer militia centred on Brisbane, plus country and coastal units as (unpaid) volunteers. This hybrid force of professionals, militia and volunteers was given legislative form by the Defence Act 1884, after the instigation of Scratchley's pay scales for militia under an October 1882 regulation. An experienced Imperial officer was also appointed Commandant in mid 1883, namely, Colonel George French, Royal Artillery.

When the Defence Act was gazetted in February 1885 the Queensland Volunteer Force became the Queensland Defence Force (QDF). That month, "A" Battery of the artillery was created as a permanent unit, intended to instruct the militia artillery, engineers, plus officers and NCOs of other units. Although permanent staff existed outside "A" battery, including HQ staff and Sergeant Instructors, the latter could be attached to "A" Battery for accommodation purposes.

As a result of these reforms the QDF had a four tier system until 1903. This consisted of a small permanent force of paid professionals (officers and instructors), while the bulk of force was militia (paid to drill and train, provided with uniforms, weapons ammunition and instruction); the third tier were volunteers who were unpaid and who paid for own uniforms while receiving weapons, ammunition and instruction; and a fourth tier consisted of the police, cadets, and rifle clubs. Another war scare, this time over Russian-British tensions over Afghanistan in April–May 1885, provided a timely boost to recruitment for the QDF's militia and volunteer units.

The 1st Queenslanders (or Moreton) Regiment (militia) was established February 1885 from the existing four companies of the former 1st Regiment of Queensland Infantry, an Ipswich company of the former 2nd Regiment, and a new Brisbane company. In the 1880s the Moreton Regiment was one of Queensland's largest militia infantry formations. By 1889 Queensland's militia regiments included the Moreton Regiment, the Wide Bay Regiment, the Kennedy Regiment, and the Darling Downs Regiment. Of the Moreton Regiment's units, "A" Company was located in Fortitude Valley, "B" in Spring Hill, "C" in North Brisbane, "D" in South Brisbane, and "E" in Kangaroo Point. In 1903 the Moreton Regiment became the 9th Australian Infantry Regiment, which later served in World War I (as the 9th Battalion, Moreton Regiment) at Gallipoli, Pozières, Ypres, and opposing Germany's Operation Michael, at a total cost of 1,094 killed and 2,422 wounded.

Other infantry units in Brisbane included the Brisbane Volunteer Rifle Corps (including various volunteer companies from 1885, becoming the Queensland Volunteer Rifles (QVR) in 1891); the Queensland Scottish Volunteer Corps (in 1885–86 three companies were formed in Brisbane and two survived to be incorporated into the QVR in 1896); and the Queensland Irish Volunteer Corps (two companies formed in 1887, absorbed into the QVR in 1896).

As well as infantry and artillery units, mounted units were formed in Brisbane during the 1880s. These included the short-lived Brisbane Mounted Volunteer Rifle Brigade, and the Brisbane Company Mounted Infantry. The latter was formed in March 1884, became the Brisbane Mounted Infantry (militia) in February 1885 and was renamed the Moreton Mounted Infantry in May 1885. The Moreton Mounted Infantry was the largest of Queensland's militia mounted infantry formations. It became part of the Queensland Mounted Infantry (QMI) in 1897 and part of the 13th Australian Light Horse (QMI) Regiment in 1903. This was later redesignated as the 2nd ALH (QMI), and members of this unit enlisted in the 2nd Light Horse Regiment to serve during World War I at Gallipoli and in Palestine.

Accompanying the burgeoning number of military units in Brisbane and the rest of Queensland was a need for places where the permanent force, militia or volunteers could assemble, store their weapons, and practice military drill. Drill sheds had existed in Brisbane from at least the 1870s, with an artillery drill shed in George Street by August 1876, and an infantry drill shed at the Roma Street railway station by 1879. Tenders for a brick artillery drill shed (located between Adelaide Street and Ann Street opposite today's Central railway station) were received in August 1878, and it was completed by February 1880. In the late 1870s drill sheds were also built at Ipswich, Rockhampton, Maryborough and Toowoomba, with a rented building in Warwick. A stone drill shed was also built at the Victoria Barracks on Petrie Terrace in c. 1887.

The Boundary Street drill shed, the last survivor of the pre-Federation Brisbane drill sheds, and the oldest of the seven Queensland pre-Federation drill sheds known to exist, was built in 1884 to replace the late 1870s drill shed near the Roma Street Railway Station. It is the only surviving drill shed built prior to the creation of the QDF in 1885, and it is the only gable-roofed pre- Federation example to survive. All the other surviving pre-Federation drill sheds in Queensland have a curved-roof design. The latter may have been built to a standard design introduced in 1884, and used iron roof trusses. In December 1885, Queensland's Colonial Architect, John James Clark, resigned and was replaced by George Connolly, who held that position until 1891.

The Defence Act of 1884 resulted in a burst of construction of drill sheds until 1891, when the economic depression of the early 1890s reduced defence spending. New drill sheds were constructed in Brisbane at Peel Street (South Brisbane) and at Woolloongabba. Elsewhere in Queensland new or replacement drill sheds were erected in Cairns, Townsville, Ravenswood, Charters Towers (1886, extant, Church Street), Bowen, Mackay, Rockhampton, Bundaberg (1889, extant, west of Maryborough Street), Gympie (1885, section still extant, moved to Everson lane), Ipswich (1891, extant, Milford Street), Bundamba (1891, extant, moved to Boonah in 1899), Southport (1891, extant, Queen Street), Dalby and Warwick. In the late 1890s drill sheds were built at Gatton, Roma and Thursday Island. A submarine mining drill shed was built at Alice Street, Brisbane in 1900, and a naval drill hall was built in Maryborough in 1901.

In some locations, caretaker's cottages were built near the drill sheds, probably to provide security for weapons stored in the buildings. Such cottages were built at Mackay, Peel Street (South Brisbane), Woolloongabba, Victoria Barracks, Ipswich, Maryborough and Warwick. At least some of these cottages housed the local drill instructor; for example in Ipswich until early 1901 the caretaker and infantry drill instructor was Quarter-Master Sergeant Hoare. Other caretaker's cottages were built near rifle ranges.

An October 1883, plan of the drill shed eventually built at Boundary Street was signed by the contractor, William Watson, and by Henry Charles Stanley, Chief Engineer for Railways. This plan show a 75-by-45-foot (23 by 14 m) gabled hall, with a 15-foot (4.6 m) skillion-roofed extension along the rear elevation, comprising six rooms entered by eight doors. These probably included an orderly room, as well as armouries for the weapons of various infantry companies. This layout, of an open hall with smaller rooms arranged along one or more elevations, seems to have been a standard arrangement for drill sheds. A small room is sketched on the plan on the left hand side (from the front) of the building, and this room exists as an office on a 1921 plan of the Boundary Street site; but by the time the drill shed was at Water Street this office was on the right hand side.

It appears the original intention was to erect the drill shed in Turbot Street, behind the Ann Street School of Arts, but in December 1883, the latter's members were concerned that the military band might annoy those taking classes – not to mention the mothers at the adjacent lying-in hospital! Another rejected proposal was a site at the corner of Ann and Creek Streets, (now the Central railway station), which was close to the Adelaide Street artillery drill shed.

By March 1884, John James Clark had completed plans for a parade ground and drill shed on the Industrial School Reserve on the north side of Boundary Street near Petrie Bight, to the east of St James's School. The Brisbane Courier of 20 March 1884 noted that "The design is very plain, but the building will be in every respect suitable for its purpose". The parade ground of 4 by 2.5 chains (260 by 160 ft; 80 by 50 m) was located between today's School Street and Barry Parade and was accessed by a lane from Wickham Street.

The drill shed, completed by November 1884, was located at the rear (north) of the parade ground and was described as "large, commodious, and well ventilated by means of shutters and a fine lantern roof". It originally had a shingle roof, although the roof was replaced with iron in two stages, between 1900 and 1908.

In May 1884, there were also requests for an orderly room, armoury, saddle room and stalls on the land reserved for an infantry drill shed at Boundary Street, for the Brisbane Company Mounted Infantry (later the Moreton Mounted Infantry). Tenders were called for a mounted infantry shed in August 1884, but this was not built until mid-1885.

In January 1885, the tender of George Bowser was accepted for levelling and fencing the parade ground, and infantry and mounted infantry were mustering at the Boundary Street drill shed by March 1885. The main units using the Boundary Street site in 1885 were the 1st Queenslanders (Moreton) Regiment and the Moreton Mounted Infantry. Other units that later used the drill shed included the Queensland Irish Volunteer Corps, who were using a room by 1891; and the Brisbane Cyclist Company of the 6th Infantry Regiment, Queensland Rifles, who were present in early 1901. The 6th Regiment and its Cyclist Corps were formed in November 1900, and passed into Commonwealth service in 1901. By July 1903 the drill shed was also used by "A" Company of the Queensland Volunteer Rifles.

A plan of the site dated late 1884/early 1885 and signed by George Bowser shows the stables occupying the southern boundary (Boundary Street end) of the parade ground, with a harness and orderly room to the west of the stables. The drill shed was located at the west side of the north end of the parade ground, with the sergeant's quarters and a "new" detached kitchen to the east of the drill shed.

The sergeant's quarters was erected for Staff Sergeant-Major Patrick Joseph Gubbins, who was the caretaker for the drill shed and also a drill instructor for the infantry. It was decided that, as the Railway Department had "taken the [former] infantry drill shed for their offices, and put up another instead in old Boundary Street", then the Railway Department should either take over the cottage adjacent to the old drill shed and build Gubbins a new residence at Boundary Street, or move the old cottage.

In November 1884, figures were given for moving Gubbin's cottage to Boundary Street, lining and painting it and building a new kitchen and it is likely that this occurred, rather than a new cottage being built. In 1893 the cottage at Boundary Street was referred to as being "very old". The cottage was erected at Boundary Street after May 1885, when the officer commanding the 1st Regiment, Lieutenant Colonel Mein, noted that a caretaker's residence was urgently required at Boundary Street, as until a responsible person was resident on the spot, it would be unsafe to allow the rifles to remain in the drill shed.

Gubbins, born in Ireland, served with British 80th Regiment (Staffordshire Volunteers) in the Burmese War of 1852–53 and the Bhutan expedition of 1865. He arrived in Queensland in 1875 and joined the Volunteer Force, acting as instructor to the Grammar School Cadets and then the 1st Queenslanders and other corps. During the late 1880s he drilled Companies "A", "B" and "C" of the 1st Queenslanders. In 1889 he was one of the 17 NCOs who were paid instructors of the QDF, and in February 1899 he received long service (39 years) and good conduct medals. He died on 18 August 1901, aged 70, while serving as Staff Paymaster-Sergeant, and his military funeral travelled from the cottage at Boundary Street to the Toowong Cemetery.

A bathroom was added to the cottage in 1907, on a concrete floor next to the kitchen, and by 1921 the cottage had been extended back to the kitchen. However, when it was moved to Water Street in 1925 a new rear area and kitchen appear to have been built. Despite this, the front four rooms and front verandah of the current cottage at Water Street date from at least 1885, and possibly the late 1870s.

After the Boundary Street buildings and Queensland's other defence assets passed to the Commonwealth in March 1901, some changes were made to the orderly room, which by June 1902 served "A" and "B" Squadrons of the 1st Battalion, Queensland Mounted Infantry. The orderly room (actually a building comprising three rooms, including an office, store and orderly room) was extended c. 1905, with the addition of a Quartermaster Sergeant's store at the east end, which required a truncation of the adjacent stables, and a new front verandah with two sets of steps. By this time the orderly room was used by the 13th Australian Light Horse Regiment. The partition between the two westernmost rooms had been removed by 1921, meaning that the orderly room consisted of three rooms when it was moved to Water Street in 1925.

Other buildings at the Boundary Street site prior to the relocation to Water Street included corrugated iron clad, skillion roofed machine gun and harness rooms built in 1907 just north of the orderly room, and a machine gun room and storage room built 1909–10 within the west end of the stables.

The Boundary Street drill shed became a training base for the newly created militia forces of the Commonwealth. The Defence Act 1909 (in force January 1911) introduced compulsory part-time military training for all males 12 and over. After World War I, the Commonwealth Government re-introduced compulsory military training.

By the 1920s the Boundary Street site was considered unsuitable for military training, as it was small and surrounded by urban development. An exchange of land between the Commonwealth and the Queensland Governments was first proposed in 1923 and the Boundary Street drill shed, caretaker's cottage, orderly room, and both sets of machine gun rooms and harness/store rooms were relocated and re- erected at the Water Street site around the end of 1925. Throughout the late 19th century and early 20th century, drill sheds were often moved to meet immediate needs.

At Water Street, the drill shed was again placed to the rear, left hand side of the parade ground, with the caretaker's cottage to the right. By 1925 the drill shed only had five rooms at the rear, a partition having been removed, and these rooms had a tar-paved floor, while the main hall had been raised on stumps due to the slope of the ground.

In November 1929 the Commonwealth abolished compulsory military training. Water Street was used as a training depot for infantry militia companies, often known as the Australian Military Forces (AMF), rather than for permanent Army personnel. The drill shed was the Regimental Headquarters of the 9/15th Battalion (Moreton and Oxley Regiment) from at least 1932. In addition to the depot's purpose as a training venue, its drill shed was, in particular, used regularly for dances and other regimental social functions by the Battalion officers' mess.

In 1934 the office on the right (northeast) elevation of the drill shed, by then a mess room, was extended to the front of the drill shed, and in 1935 a sergeant's mess was added to the left (southwest) elevation. Verandahs have been added to the southeast and northeast elevations of the drill shed since 1990, and partitions have been partially removed between the four easternmost rooms to the rear of the hall.

Additions to the cottage have also occurred. By 1948 the cottage had a verandah added to its northeast elevation. In 1951 it was occupied by Captain Thomas Erlsford Hayes, Camp Commandant, Northern Command. A new, larger laundry existed by 1962, and the cottage has since had a modern extension added to the rear of the kitchen. In 2011 it was being used as offices by the Endeavour College of Natural Health.

The orderly room appears to have been initially set on the north-east boundary of the site (with a single set of steps to the verandah), before being shifted to the south-west boundary by 1934. A new wing was added to the north-west end of the orderly room before 1946, forming an L-shaped building, and another extension occurred at the south-east end post 1962. In 1963 it was occupied by a Royal Australian Army Nursing Corps (RAANC) training unit, and in 2011 it was used as offices by the Endeavour College. In 2013, as part of approved demolition, the twentieth century extensions were demolished and the building relocated adjacent to the south-western side of the drill shed, set off from it about two metres.

The two sets of machine gun rooms and harness/store rooms from Boundary Street were erected on the north-east boundary of the Water Street site near the cottage, but these were replaced c. 1948 with a garage and workshop. After 1925 there were toilets along the south- west boundary of the site, between the drill shed and the second location of the orderly room, but these were replaced by a new toilet block in 1953.

After the outbreak of World War II on 3 September 1939, the drill shed was one of just three AMF depots in Brisbane selected by the Federal Government to accept and process the volunteers enlisting as part of Queensland's contribution to the new 2nd Australian Imperial Force (2nd AIF). At the same time, the depot continued to accept new recruits wishing to join the militia, which could serve only within Australian territory. In June 1940, after the fall of France, compulsory home service (militia) training was introduced for unmarried men and widowers without children between 18 and 35 years of age. Many men went to the Water Street Depot with their call-up papers where they were processed for service with the AMF.

On 15 July 1941 a home-guard force entitled the Volunteer Defence Corps (VDC) began to be raised across local districts. At least one company of No. 1 Battalion, Post Office Volunteer Corps, later incorporated into the VDC, trained at the Water Street Depot during World War II. The Water Street Depot was also one of the principal Brisbane sites providing medical examinations and enlistments for Civil Constructional Corps (CCC) workers. New members of the Allied Works Council (AWC) staff were also sent to the depot.

As a result of the above activities, during World War II a number of huts were added to the Water Street site, within the parade ground and along the Water Street boundary. Most of these have since been removed, although in 2011 two huts still survived along the north-east boundary, and were used as a residence and an acupuncture clinic. A smaller World War II hut was moved to between the orderly room and the 1953 toilets, to be used as an office.

After World War II the drill shed continued its pre-war tradition of hosting social events including in late 1945, fund-raising functions for the Miss Australia contest. Reunions of service units, in particular the 2/1st Australian Tank Attack Regiment which held its first reunion at Water Street in 1946, and the 2/15th Battalion AIF, occurred in the post-war years. Former members and veterans of the 2/14th Light Horse and of the 2nd Cavalry Regiment also commenced meeting at Water Street.

The Australian Regular Army was created in September 1947 and in 1948, the Royal Australian Regiment was formed from full-time soldiers. As a result, the AMF was renamed the Citizen Military Forces (CMF). The CMF comprised part-time soldiers recruited into state-based units. Locally, these units became components of the Royal Queensland Regiment (RQR).

In July 1949, approval was given for the establishment of a CMF armoured car squadron to be known as "A" Squadron 2/14th QMI. The headquarters of this unit were located at the Water Street Depot. In 1951, the National Service Scheme was introduced that required all 18-year-old males to register for six months compulsory military training together with a further period of part-time service. Some "Nashos" would have undergone their military service at the Water Street Depot.

The depot was used for other purposes by the military. It was revamped in 1955 and became the base for a number of health associated CMF units and their training facilities. A new hut at the south-east corner of the site was erected in 1955 as a lecture hut and Quartermaster's store for No. 1 Dental Unit. A World War II hut on the north-east boundary (the northernmost of the two remaining in 2011) was converted into a "Model Ward" in 1955 presumably for either No. 1 Casualty Clearing Station or No. 4 Preventative Medicine Company. By the late 1970s, the Water Street Depot held Army Reserve (a redesignation of the CMF) units. The Commonwealth disposed of the Water Street Depot in 1988, after which it was adapted for use as the Endeavour College of Natural Health.

In January 2004 the Brisbane City Council entered the former Water Street Army Depot site in Schedule 1 of the Heritage Register Planning Scheme Policy of the Brisbane City Plan (City Plan Heritage Register). The site was included in the Bowen Hills Urban Development Area (UDA) as designated by the Urban Land Development Authority (ULDA) in 2009. The ULDA prepared a Development Scheme for this UDA that acknowledged the nature and extent of the heritage listing of the depot site by the City Council. Then in 2011 the site was sold and the process was begun to transform it and a neighbouring Brunswick Street site into a mixed-use development. In December that year, after receiving an application, the Queensland Heritage Council decided to enter parts of the depot site encompassing the drill shed, cottage and orderly room building in the Queensland Heritage Register.

A series of development applications have been lodged with and approved by the ULDA (now Economic Development Queensland) over the former Water Street depot site. As part of these development approvals the drill shed, cottage and orderly room will be retained and incorporated into the staged development taking place over the entire site. In February 2014 these approvals have meant partial demolition of twentieth century elements of the former orderly room and its relocation within the site. The three heritage buildings will be used for communal facilities within the Central Village development.

== Description ==
The former Water Street drill shed, caretaker's cottage and orderly room are collected at the rear (at the north-east) of a large mixed- use development site bounded by Water Street to the south and Brunswick Street to the west. In 2014 the heritage place is surrounded by medium density residential and office developments. The ground plane slopes up from Water Street towards the rear boundary on the north-western side, where the former drill shed, caretaker's cottage and orderly room are located. Facing south-east, these buildings overlook the site from the highest point.

=== Drill shed ===
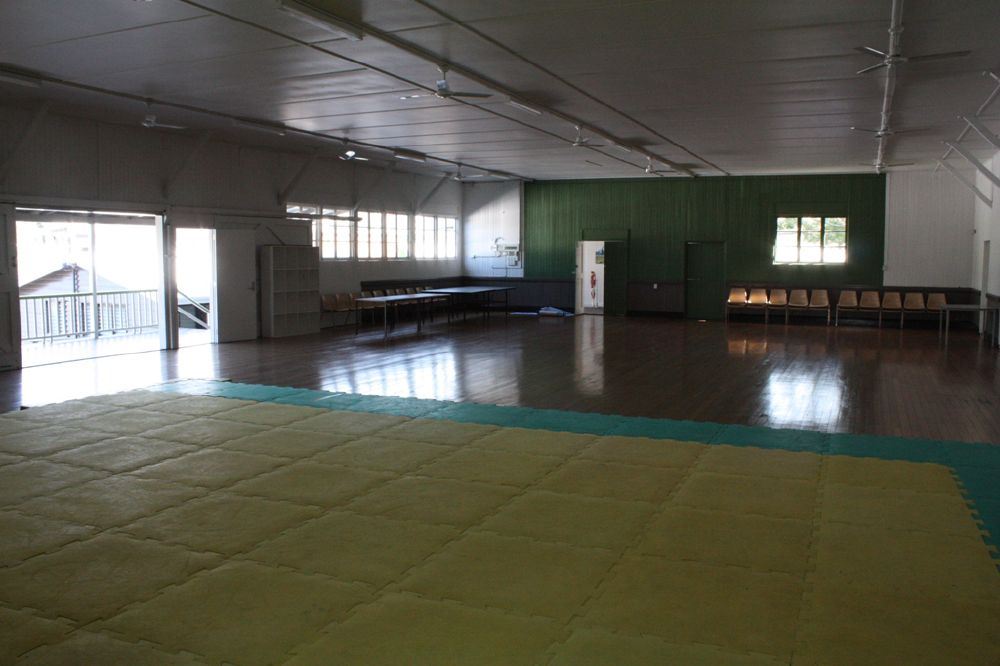
Interior of the shed

The drill shed is a single-storey, weatherboard-clad, timber-framed building standing on concrete stumps at the front and slab-on-ground at the rear. Situated close to the rear boundary, the long axis of the building is aligned approximately north-east to south-west. The main gable roof is clad in corrugated metal sheeting and has a gable-roofed ventilating ridge running nearly its full length. The north-west side of the building has a skillion roof attached to the main roof. Two skillion-roofed additions on concrete stumps are attached to the north-east and south-west sides of the building. A modern verandah of timber construction runs along the south-east and north-east facades – this structure is not of heritage significance.

The main entrance is through the centre of the south-east facade, now accessed by the modern verandah. This doorway consists of two large sliding timber ledged-and-braced doors. A small hatch door is built into the eastern panel and the western door panel has had a modern doorway cut into it. Rows of timber-framed casement windows on either side of the main entrance occupy openings that once housed timber awning shutters.

The north-eastern and south-western facades each retain a single window opening with casements that match those on the main facade. A single timber-battened door with hood is located at the rear of the south-western facade, while a modern flush door is located at the rear of the north-eastern facade. The north-eastern addition is mostly clad in weatherboards with modern French doors opening onto the verandah. Its rear wall is clad in corrugated metal sheeting with a timber hood over a small window. The south-western addition is clad entirely in corrugated metal sheeting, with timber framed double hung sash windows. It has a timber battened door with fanlight on the south- eastern side. A small timber staircase with portico provides access to this door. Windows along the rear north-west facade are timber-framed, eight-light awning windows grouped in five pairs with one solitary window. A concrete spoon drain runs along the base of this wall.

The layout of the drill shed consists of a large hall with a series of five rooms along the north-west side. Eight doors lead to these rooms however only three are operational. Doors in the north-east and south- west walls lead to the two side additions. A ceiling has been installed in the hall area, attached to the bottom chord of the timber roof trusses but with diagonal timber supporting members protruding through it along the north-west and south-east sides. The walls are lined with timber tongue-and-groove boards; vertical v-jointed boards on the north-east, south-east and south-west walls; and wide horizontal beaded boards on the north-west wall. A timber belt rail and timber skirting run around the entire hall. The floor is lined with narrow polished timber boards. Of the eight doors along the north-west wall, six are matching timber-battened doors, some with early door hardware. The door at the western end is of a similar style but made from narrower timber boards, while the door at the eastern end is a modern double door.

Wall linings in the rooms along the north-west side of the hall retain some original wide beaded boards, while other areas have v-jointed boards or fibre cement sheeting. Openings have been cut into the dividing walls between four of the rooms however the layout and size of each of the rooms is still apparent. Several of the doors into the hall have been sheeted over on this side.

The two side additions are single rectangular rooms. The interior of the north-eastern addition has been relined with modern materials and a kitchenette installed at the northern end. The south-western addition is lined with v-jointed boards on the walls and ceiling.

=== Caretaker's Cottage ===
The cottage is a high-set, timber-framed building with weatherboard cladding and a hipped roof. Located close to the northernmost corner of the site, it has two skillion-roofed additions to the rear – a corrugated iron clad shed (formerly the laundry) and a modern extension clad in fibre cement sheeting. These two additions are not of heritage significance.

Windows along the south-west facade of the cottage are two-light, timber-framed sash windows. An extension along the north-east side of the building was once a verandah but is now enclosed with fibro sheeting. The front verandah, accessed by a central timber staircase, has been enclosed with fibre-cement sheeting and sliding windows but retains the single skin verandah wall, a double-hung sash window, timber verandah posts and balustrade. The core of the house consists of four rooms with a corridor running between the two front rooms. Most walls are single-skin lined with vertical v-jointed tongue-and- groove boards. Some internal doors are high-waisted interwar style. The rear verandah, now enclosed, separates the core from the former kitchen in the north-east corner, now used as office space with doors leading into the modern extension on the northern side. A bathroom at the eastern end of the verandah leads through to a room in the north- east extension. A built-in cupboard made from timber v-jointed boards remains near the entrance to the bathroom.

=== Orderly room ===
The former orderly room is a timber-framed, weatherboard-clad building standing adjacent to the south-western side of the drill shed. It is single-storey, has a corrugated metal-clad gable roof, and is set off the ground on timber posts. Parts having been demolished, a range of temporary measures have been employed to support and enclose the building. The building retains a short section of verandah running along its southern side. The verandah has stop-chamfered timber posts and the ceiling is lined with wide, beaded timber boards. Two six- light double-hung sash windows feature on the building's eastern and northern elevations. A single, flat-sheeted door opens onto the south- facing verandah, as do two double-hung sashes above a narrow timber counter mounted with simple timber brackets against the wall. The interior of the building contains two rooms. Sections of the interior of the building have been lined with modern materials.

== Heritage listing ==
The former Drill Shed, Caretaker's Cottage and Orderly Room were listed on the Queensland Heritage Register on 2 December 2011 having satisfied the following criteria.

The place is important in demonstrating the evolution or pattern of Queensland's history.

The drill shed, caretaker's cottage and orderly room (former) are part of Queensland's response to perceived external threats in the 1870s and 1880s, and are important in demonstrating the resulting military training and support infrastructure constructed during the pre-Federation period in Queensland.

Constructed in 1884–85 at Boundary Street, Fortitude Valley, and moved to Water Street, Fortitude Valley in 1925, the three colonial-era buildings served a number of Brisbane-based units of the Queensland Defence Force (QDF), and later the Australian Military Forces, the 2nd Australian Imperial Force, the Citizen Military Forces and the Army Reserve.

The QDF and its drill sheds and parade grounds, taken over by the Commonwealth of Australia in 1901, facilitated the development of Queensland's military units which later went on to serve in World Wars I and II.

The place demonstrates rare, uncommon or endangered aspects of Queensland's cultural heritage.

The 1884 drill shed at Water Street is the oldest known surviving drill shed in Queensland, built prior to the formation of the QDF in February 1885.

Of the seven known surviving pre-Federation Queensland drill sheds, it is the only one with a gable-roofed design, and it is also the last remaining pre-Federation drill shed in Brisbane.

Along with its accompanying caretaker's cottage and the former 1885 orderly room of the Moreton Mounted Infantry, both also moved from Boundary Street to Water Street in 1925, the drill shed is part of an uncommon group of colonial era defence buildings. As a pair, the drill shed and the cottage may be a unique surviving example in Queensland.

The place is important in demonstrating the principal characteristics of a particular class of cultural places.

The drill shed is important in demonstrating the principal characteristics of a pre-Federation Queensland drill shed, retaining its large hall area with office and armoury rooms arranged along one side. The hall and the rear rooms of the drill shed continue to illustrate how the building functioned, with spaces for drilling, weapons storage and administration.

The place has a special association with the life or work of a particular person, group or organisation of importance in Queensland's history.

The three buildings have a special association with the QDF, an organisation regarded as the first line of defence for colonial Queensland and whose units became part of the Commonwealth forces of Australia after Federation. The drill shed, cottage and orderly room served as military training, accommodation and administration facilities for over 100 years, from 1885 to 1988.

In particular, the buildings have an important association with the 1st Queenslanders (Moreton) Regiment and the Moreton Mounted Infantry, two important QDF militia units, and their post-Federation incarnations, the 9th Australian Infantry Regiment and the 13th Australian Light Horse Regiment.
