= Baroona Special School =

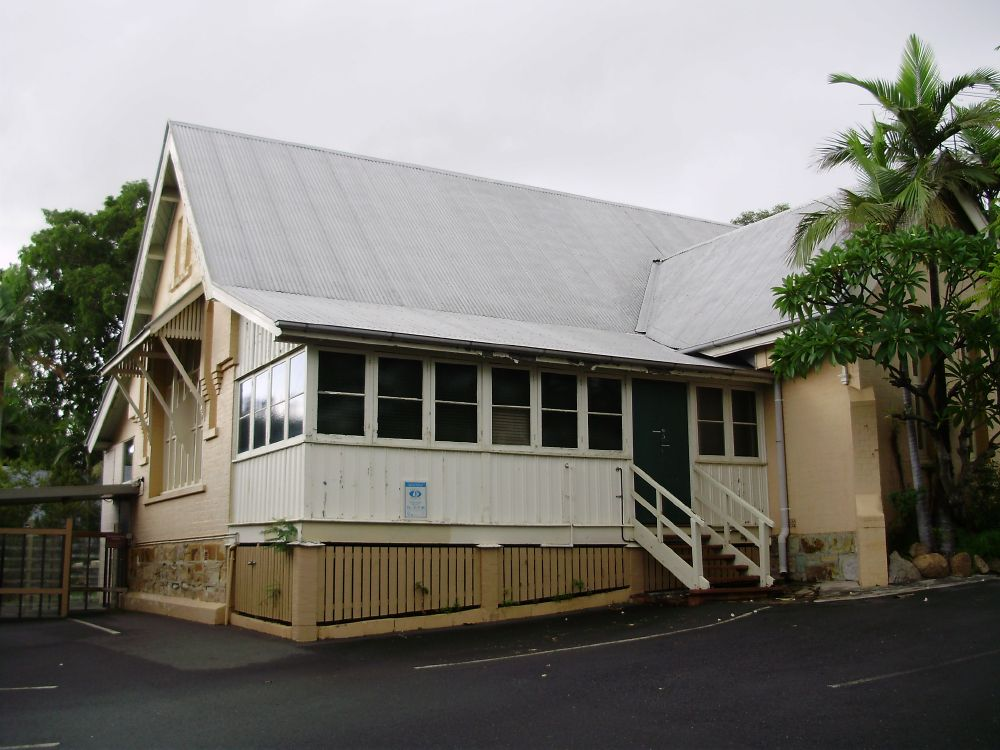
- Baroona Special School, 2009

- Location within Queensland Location within Australia
- 27.4662°S 153.0111°E
- Location: 1 Hale Street, Petrie Terrace, City of Brisbane, Queensland, Australia

History
- Design period: 1840s–1860s (mid-19th century)
- Built: 1868–1921

Site notes
- Architect: Richard George Suter
- Architectural style: Gothic Revival

Queensland Heritage Register
- Official name: Baroona Special School, Baroona Opportunity School, Petrie Terrace Opportunity School, Petrie Terrace School
- Type: state heritage (built)
- Designated: 21 October 1992
- Reference no.: 600278
- Significant period: 1860s–1870s (fabric); 1914, 1921 (fabric); 1860s–ongoing (social); 1860s–1920s (historical)
- Significant components: classroom/classroom block/teaching area, school/school room

Baroona Special School is a heritage-listed state school at 1 Hale Street, Petrie Terrace, City of Brisbane, Queensland, Australia. It was built from 1868 to 1921. It is also known as Baroona Opportunity School, Petrie Terrace Opportunity School, and Petrie Terrace School. It was added to the Queensland Heritage Register on 21 October 1992.

== History ==
The Baroona Special School comprises a number of buildings, including two brick buildings, one of which was opened in March 1868 as the Petrie Terrace School, whilst the second building was erected in 1874 as the new Petrie Terrace Girls and Infants School.

Petrie Terrace developed as a working class suburb of Brisbane during the 1860s. Brisbane Gaol was built on the main road into town in 1860, and military barracks were erected in 1864. This site on which the school is located was reserved for educational purposes in the early 1860s.

The Education Act of 1860 established a Board of General Education and provided for a system of government-subsidised primary school, similar to the system then operating in New South Wales. Under the Queensland Act, communities were required to contribute one-third of the cost of construction of new school buildings. Pupils at schools were also subject to payment of fees. At its commencement in 1860, the Board acquired four schools; 73 schools had been opened by 1868, and by 1874, 203 schools were open.

=== State primary school ===
By the mid 1860s, a school was needed in the rapidly growing Petrie Terrace area, and efforts commenced to raise the necessary funds. The long rectangular classroom with end porches and a teacher's room was erected in 1867, costing around £400. The classroom was designed to accommodate 150 pupils, with separate "departments" for male and female students. Just over 300 students were enrolled at Petrie Terrace School by the end of 1868, although the average attendance for that year was 157 pupils.

The building was designed by architect Richard George Suter. By 1865, he had begun working in Brisbane, where he was employed by Benjamin Backhouse. In 1864, Backhouse had prepared a model plan for the Queensland Board of Education to be used for country schools. Whilst employed in Backhouse's office, Suter prepared designs for school buildings, which later led to the Board to commission him for the design of timber schools and teachers' residences. From the end of 1868 until 1875, Suter undertook almost all of the Board's work which involved approximately 30 National Schools including schools in centres such as Toowoomba, Warwick, Gympie, Rockhampton, Townsville, Roma, and Bundaberg as well as the Brisbane area.

An inspection of the school in November 1873 reported that the school was crowded and that, as the district continued to increase in population, at least double the classroom accommodation would be required. It is also likely that the introduction of free education in Queensland in 1870 stimulated the growth of the school. The report further noted that it was really a very fine school.

Drawings for a new building were prepared by Suter by January 1874. The tender price for the new building was £1022, and included separate rooms for the female students and the "infants". Although officially opened in January 1875, the new building was occupied from late 1874, and known as the Petrie Terrace Girls and Infants School.

Suter designed the new building to be somewhat in character with the existing school. A feature of Suter's work was his use of construction materials to provide ornamentation for the building, whilst working within the strict budget set by the Board. The 1867 and 1875 buildings demonstrated Suter's characteristic use of the Gothic Revival Style and showed a progression in the design of window openings and the use of corbel ornamentation of the walls and gables in an attempt to surmount the innate vulgarity of bricks and hardwood.

The headmaster of the Petrie Terrace School (Boys and Girls/Infants) from 1868 to 1898 was John Bowden Fewings, a gentleman and scholar. In 1892, Fewings wrote a collection of letters, (published in 1990 as JB Fewings Memoirs of Toowong) which provide a useful source of information on the development of Toowong and its inhabitants. Petrie Terrace School became well known for its many scholarship successes with many students becoming prominent Brisbane identities.

By 1884, it was recommended that a new school be erected for the boys, who still occupied the 1867 school building. Various sites were considered, and land was reserved on Moreton Street, some streets to the north of the then Petrie Terrace School. Tenders for a new State School for Boys at Petrie Terrace were called in July 1888, and the Boys' School had relocated to the new site by May 1889. The Petrie Terrace Girls and Infants School remained on the original site; the 1867 building was used as the Infants' Department.

Improvements to the school grounds were carried out from the early 1880s. These included tree plantings in the playground and the erection of play sheds (no longer extant). Records indicate that the shade trees planted included bamboos, Moreton Bay figs, silky oaks, camphor laurels, small leafed figs and a jacaranda.

The buildings were altered in 1914, at which time verandahs were added to the eastern side of the 1867 building and the northern side of the 1874 building. New gable windows and sunshades were added to the exterior of both buildings, greatly improving the ventilation and lighting of the classrooms. Both buildings were remodelled, including the removal of interior galleries and the entry porch from the northern side of the 1867 building, and the reorganisation of the teaching areas in the 1874 building with glass partitions. A new room for teachers was also added to the 1874 building. At the same time a retaining wall was constructed east of the 1874 building, and a Drill Ground was formed. The 1914 plans also indicate that there were two play sheds west of the 1867 building.

In 1921, a classroom was added to the northwest of the 1867 building. A new classroom was also added to the north side of the 1874 building at this time.

The site was sewered in 1929, at which time the existing earth closets were removed and a new lavatory block erected.

In July 1953, the Petrie Terrace Boys and Girls Schools were amalgamated. The Girls School relocated to the Moreton Street buildings, and a separate Infants School was formed at the Hale Street school. The Infants School was amalgamated with the Petrie Terrace School on Moreton Street from July 1960.

=== Opportunity school ===
Following the removal of the infants school to Moreton Street, the Hale Street school became the Petrie Terrace Opportunity School (for children with disabilities). The conversion of the Infants School to the Opportunity School included the addition of a new classroom to the 1874 building and a further remodelling of classrooms in both buildings. A Manual Training room was built into the basement level of the 1874 building, whilst a former classroom in the same building was converted into a Home Science Room.

Special training for handicapped pupils had commenced in Queensland in the late 1880s with centres for blind and deaf children. In 1923 WF Bevington, a District Inspector of Schools, prepared a plan for the provision of special classes for children with intellectual and emotional problems who were not making "normal" progress at school. The first "backward" classes, as they were initially described, commenced at the South Brisbane Boys' School. The classes proved successful, and during 1923 similar classes were formed at the Fortitude Valley (Boys), New Farm (Mixed), Petrie Terrace (Girls), Ipswich Central (Boys), Townsville Central (Boys), Rockhampton and Toowoomba South (Girls) Schools. By the end of 1923, just over 330 pupils were in attendance at these classes, supervised by 15 teachers. From the middle of 1926 the name "Opportunity Schools", rather than Backward Schools, was adopted for these centres.

Additions and remodelling were carried out at the school in 1961, and in 1962 the school was renamed the Baroona Opportunity School. A new toilet block was erected in 1964. Further remodelling of the school commenced in the early 1970s, and in 1975 a new amenities block was erected in place of the 1964 block, and a covered play area and new administration block were constructed. A hall had also been constructed on the site by 1975.

The school was renamed the Baroona Special School in 1974. It continued to provide special education until 16 June 1995 when the school was closed.

=== Present use ===
In 2004, the school became the Albert Park Flexible Learning Centre, providing Years 11 and 12 (final two years of secondary school) to students needing more flexible school arrangements. It caters to students between the ages of 14 and 25. The centre was first established in 1990 in Albert Park to provide education to homeless children and later occupied the Lady Bowen Building in Spring Hill before the move to its present location. The school now supports a wider range of students, including parents of young children.

== Description ==
Located at the corner of Hale Street and Milton Road, the Baroona Special School comprises a complex of buildings. The earliest buildings on the site were erected in 1867 and 1874, and these buildings retain a prominent position in the south west corner of the site.

=== 1867 Building ===
This single-storeyed brick building is T-shaped in plan, with steep gable roofs designed for shingles, and dormer windows either side of the main roof ridge. The walls are of English bond, and the largely unaltered southwest elevation has corbels and eaves brackets to support the dormer windows, and lancet windows with straight pointed heads set between the corbels.

The building is set on Brisbane tuff foundations, with brick buttresses to the corners of the minor gable, the weathering stones of which have rubbed depressions from sharpening slate pencils.

The main gable end walls assumed their present form in 1914, when the timber porch at each end was replaced by a large composite 24-sash window, and the lancet window to each side of the new central window and the double rectangular windows above were bricked up; the brick lozenge-shaped ventilation opening in the gable peak remaining unaltered.

The timber verandah on the east side of the building was also built in 1914, and is contemporary with the two eastern doorways into the classrooms, and the removal of the original galleries from the building interior. There is a later glazed verandah infill on the northwest.

Within the 1867 building, the space is divided into two classrooms by a concertina room divider, and has a raked plaster ceiling.

=== 1874 Building ===
Constructed to the north of the 1867 classroom, this building comprised an L-shaped, single-storeyed structure with basement on tuff foundations with a steep pitched roof and dormer windows in the hips.

This building is also in English bond, with lozenge vents in the gable peaks, but unlike the earlier building, has a running frieze of brick corbels below the eaves, raked brick window sills and square headed window openings.

Brick buttresses are provided to the north and east gable corners where the ground falls away.

Although the 1874 south and west timber verandahs and brick porch remain, the north verandah was added in 1914 at the same time as 24 pane composite windows were inserted into each of the three brick gables. Within the building, brick panels were removed and RSJ beams inserted to allow construction of the large glazed door partition to the northern verandah, and the opening into the southern porch area. The existing glazed partitions between classrooms were also constructed in 1914, contemporary with removal of the galleries and bricking-up of selected doors and windows.

The roof truss is lined with timber boards above the rafters, and comprises a mid tie and a tie at the wall plate, with vertical steel connecting rods.

The 1874 building has been extended to the north with a brick store building (before 1929), a timber infants' room built over a basement room (before 1959) and a new passage and classroom built in 1959 with a newly fitted out manual training room and laundry underneath. The 1959 extension has face brickwork foundations, and is sheeted in weatherboards with hopper windows replacing the earlier sliding sashes, and has a corrugated GI roof.

French doors provide access to the early verandahs, which are of timber with hardwood floorboards, square section posts and no balustrading, and which are open except for ventilated storage space on the western edge.

=== Grounds ===
The 1914 drill ground remains as a grassed area to the east of the 1867 building. The reinforced concrete retaining wall along the northern site boundary dates from 1929, the same year that sewage was laid on and a new toilet block constructed beside the 1874 building. The 1929 toilet block was demolished in 1975, to make way for the existing covered play area and administration area. Toilet amenities and a tuckshop now occupy a 1975 steel framed building in the northeast corner of the site, next to the c.1950s fibro hall.

The school grounds and the perimeter have several large mature trees that are likely to have been planted before 1929, and which provide a framework for the attractive carefully tended garden and building surrounds at the school.

== Heritage listing ==
Baroona Special School was listed on the Queensland Heritage Register on 21 October 1992 having satisfied the following criteria.

The place is important in demonstrating the evolution or pattern of Queensland's history.

As the site of a primary school from the late 1860s, the Baroona Special School is associated with the development of education in Queensland from this time. The School has an important association with the development of Special Education in Queensland, as one of eight schools in which special education classes were held in the early-mid 1920s, and the subsequent conversion of the school to an Opportunity School during the 1960s. The erection of the first building in 1867 and a second building in 1874 also illustrate the development of Petrie Terrace as a residential area during this time.

The place is important in demonstrating the principal characteristics of a particular class of cultural places.

The buildings erected in 1867 and in 1874 survive as early examples of brick school buildings designed by prominent architect RG Suter, who was responsible for the design of school buildings in Queensland during the late 1860s and early-mid 1870s, a period of expansion of school facilities in Queensland. Subsequent additions and alterations to the 1867 and 1874 buildings provide evidence of changing attitudes towards primary and special education.

The place is important because of its aesthetic significance.

The grounds of the school contain several mature trees and evidence of earlier use of the grounds, for example as a Drill area. The prominent location of the 1867 and 1874 buildings on the corner of Hale Street and Milton Road, and the mature trees located around the perimeter of the grounds, contribute to the Petrie Terrace townscape.
