= Petrie Terrace Police Depot =

Historic building in Brisbane, Queensland

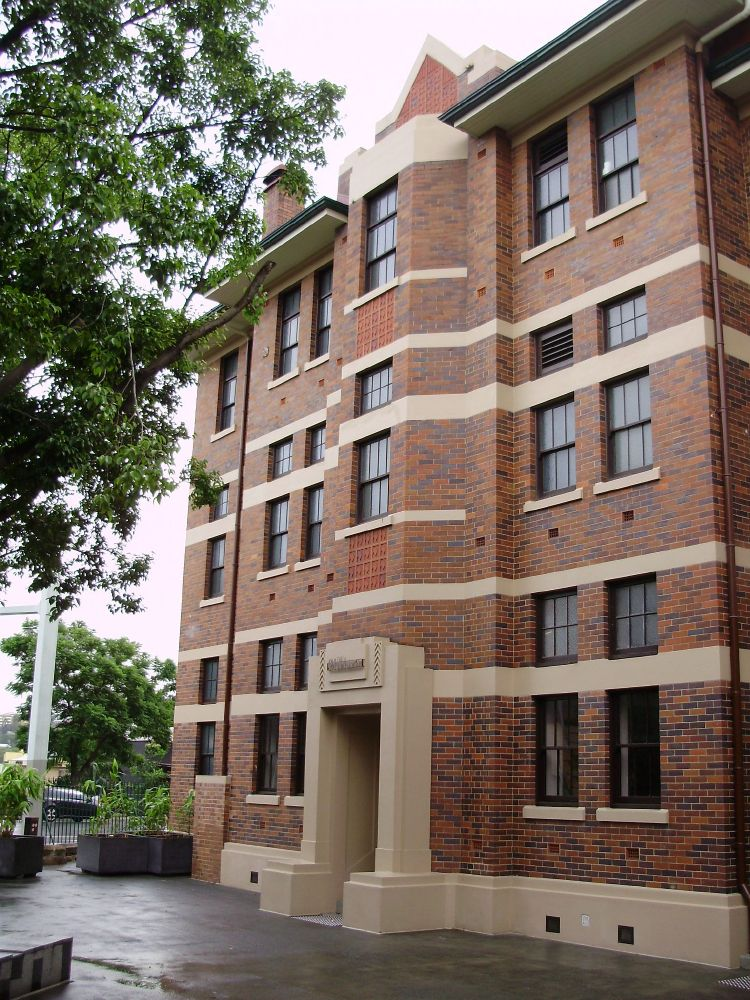
- Entrance to the former Petrie Terrace Police Depot, 2009

- Location within Queensland Location within Australia
- 27.4654°S 153.0135°E
- Location: 25–61 Petrie Terrace, Petrie Terrace, City of Brisbane, Queensland, Australia

History
- Design period: 1840s–1860s (mid-19th century)
- Built: 1850s–1960s

Queensland Heritage Register
- Official name: Petrie Terrace Police Depot (former), Underground Night Club
- Type: state heritage (built, archaeological)
- Designated: 23 July 1999
- Reference no.: 601894
- Significant period: 1850s–1860s, 1930s (historical); 1850s–1930s (fabric)
- Significant components: parade ground/quadrangle/assembly ground, barracks – police, stables, roof/ridge ventilator/s / fleche/s, garage, fence/wall – perimeter, wall/s – retaining, workshop
- Builders: Andrew Petrie, John Petrie, Joshua Jeays

Petrie Terrace Police Depot is a heritage-listed former police barracks at 25–61 Petrie Terrace, Petrie Terrace, City of Brisbane, Queensland, Australia. It was built from 1850s to 1960s. It was added to the Queensland Heritage Register on 23 July 1999.

The site was vacated by the police in the mid-1980s and sold in 1987. The police barracks remained unused for two decades, while the two other surviving buildings saw alternate uses for some years. In 2007–08, the entire site was redeveloped as a commercial and retail precinct known as "The Barracks".

== History ==
The site of the former Petrie Terrace Police Depot occupies the southwest edge of a ridge formerly known as Green Hills, which overlooks the former Roma Street railway yards and the Brisbane central business district. The place has been associated with penal and police activity in Queensland since the 1850s. The site was occupied by the second purpose-built Brisbane Gaol from November 1860 until July 1883, and functioned as a police barracks from 1885 until the mid-1980s. Within the former Petrie Terrace Police Depot, the former Police Barracks, opened in September 1939, is a highly visible and prominent landmark in Brisbane.

The site was early associated with a penal facility. When Moreton Bay was opened to free settlement in February 1842, the only prison accommodation available was at one end of the former military barracks in Queen Street – the remainder of the building was occupied by storekeepers. In the second half of 1847 the former female factory in Queen Street, which had served as an immigration barracks for some years, was refurbished as a gaol. This was a temporary measure until Brisbane's first purpose-built gaol was erected in 1848–49. However, within a few years the construction of a larger gaol complex was considered necessary.

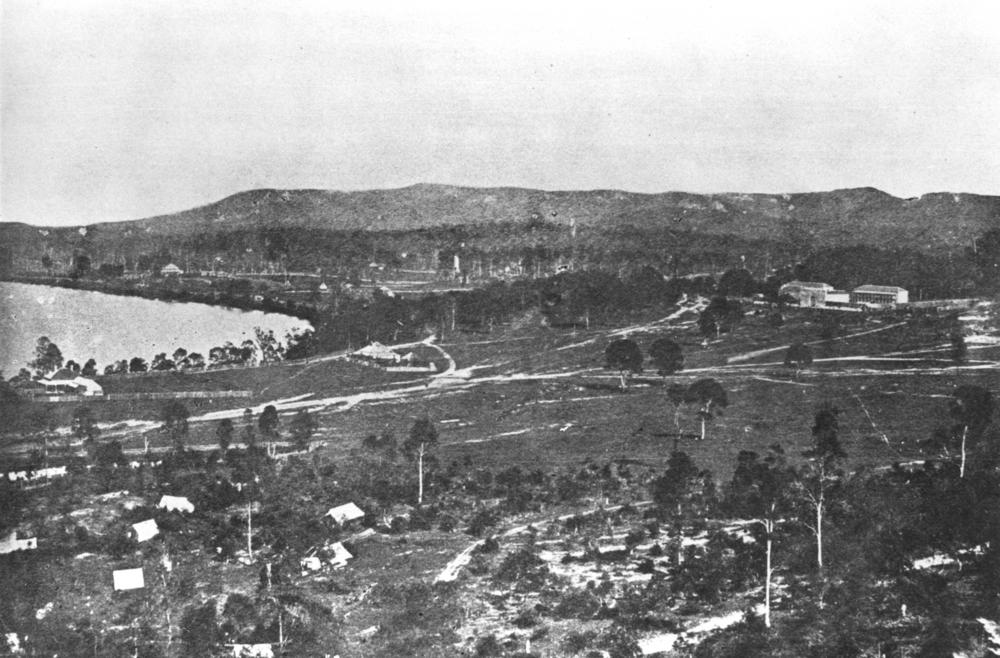
Aerial view of Petrie Terrace Gaol, 1862

By 1856, a gaol reserve had been proposed in the vicinity of what is now Petrie Terrace – the area known in the 1850s as Green Hills. The site was considered remote, well-drained, healthy and extendable. In 1857 the New South Wales Colonial Architect provided plans for a gaol to accommodate nearly 100 prisoners at Green Hills. The contract was let in mid-1858 to Andrew and John Petrie of Brisbane – their name being commemorated in Petrie Terrace – who submitted a tender of £25,000. Construction commenced in October 1858, and was completed by September 1860, when the complex was proclaimed as the Brisbane Gaol. The buildings were masonry, and included 2 two-storeyed cell blocks; 2 two-storeyed guard houses containing offices, warders' room and store rooms, flanking the main entrance to the gaol (which faced southeast, overlooking the Town of Brisbane); kitchen block; washhouses; and lavatory blocks. The gaol reserve was enclosed by a wooden fence, which was replaced in 1862 by a 20-foot (6.1 m) high stone wall, constructed by contractor Joshua Jeays of Brisbane. Stone for the gaol wall was obtained from the Woogaroo Quarry.

Almost from its inception, the Brisbane Gaol on Petrie Terrace was overcrowded. By 1865, overflow prisoners were being accommodated on the hulk Proserpine, anchored at the mouth of the Brisbane River, and in 1867 the decision was taken to convert the quarantine buildings then under construction on St Helena Island, in Moreton Bay, into gaol buildings. St Helena was gazetted as a prison in the same year, and operated in tandem with the Brisbane Gaol on Petrie Terrace. In 1870 the female prisoners at Petrie Terrace were relocated to the Toowoomba Gaol. These measures afforded only temporary solutions to the overcrowding at the Brisbane Gaol, and in the late 1870s plans for the new Boggo Road Gaol in South Brisbane were prepared. This complex was constructed in the early 1880s and completed in 1883, with the gaol on Petrie Terrace closing on 2 July 1883.

The colonial government initially intended that the Queensland Defence Force, which was reorganised and expanded in the mid-1880s following the "Russian scare" of 1883, should occupy the former Petrie Terrace gaol reserve, along with the adjacent former military barracks, which had been established in 1864 to accommodate a small contingent of Imperial troops, but which had been occupied since 1874 by the Queensland Police Force.

However, in 1885 the gaol reserve on Petrie Terrace was divided between the newly established permanent Queensland Defence Force and the Queensland Police Force. The QDF occupied the 1864 military reserve and the northern end of the gaol reserve, the whole of which was renamed Victoria Barracks by mid-1885. The Queensland Police Force occupied the remainder of the gaol reserve on Petrie Terrace, as a police depot and training centre. At this time the former guard houses and a block which contained the chapel, kitchen and workshop, were renovated as quarters and offices for the police, but the former cell blocks were demolished. The police occupied the former gaol reserve for a century, from 1885 until the mid-1980s, although the site was not officially gazetted as a reserve for police purposes until 1901.

The re-use of the gaol reserve for police and military purposes necessitated the demolition of the surrounding stone wall, most of which was removed in 1885, although the arched stone entrance gate on the southeastern perimeter remained until the mid-20th century. The stone was recycled and used on various government projects in Brisbane, including the foundations supporting the iron palisade separating Queen's Park (now part of the City Botanic Gardens) in Alice Street. It is understood that the stone base to the surviving fence along Petrie Terrace at the former Petrie Terrace Police Depot, and the stone retaining wall between the Defence and Police Reserves, are constructed from fabric from the 1862 wall.

In the 1880s, as the Queensland economy boomed and new districts were opened to settlement, the number of men recruited into the Queensland police force increased significantly. Recruits received a brief period of training at the Petrie Terrace Police Depot, where facilities were strained. Along with recruits, the depot accommodated probationary officers and unmarried officers serving in the Brisbane area. In 1889, the police barracks at Petrie Terrace was described as a very bad barracks, damp in wet weather, without a washhouse or proper earth closets, and overcrowded. Despite the poor conditions, prior to 1901 only minor alterations and additions were made to the depot buildings.

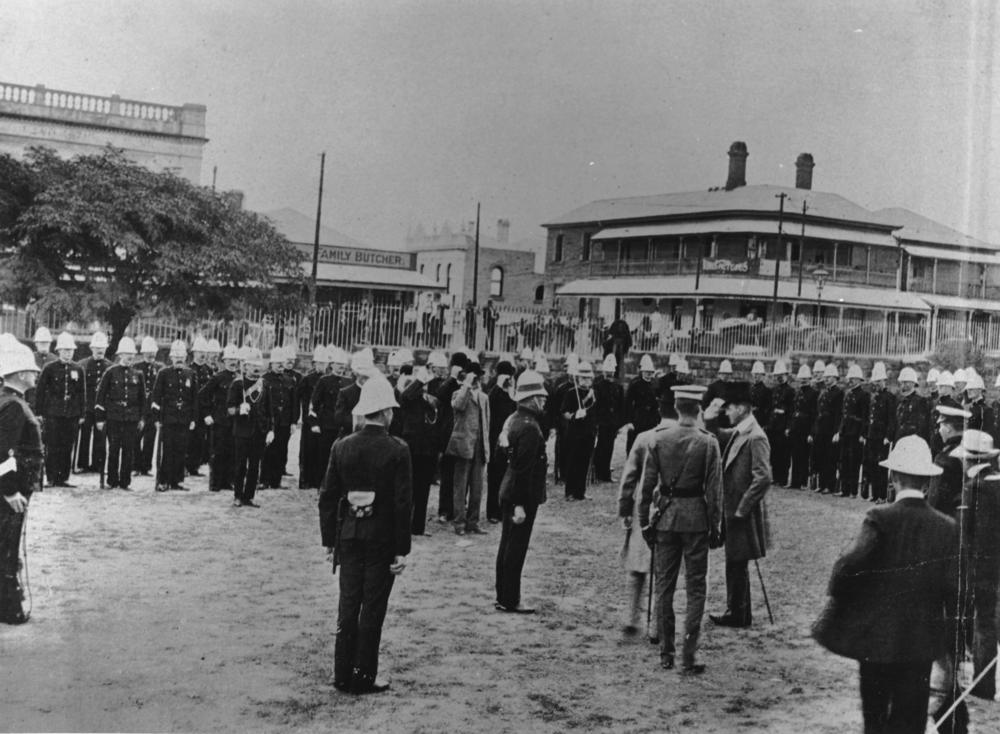
Presentation of medals to ex-members of the Queensland Police Force, Petrie Terrace, 1909 (present day Lord Alfred Hotel is visible at the back right)

In the period 1895 to 1925 the Queensland population almost doubled. The Queensland Police Force, while not quite matching this growth rate, increased by one third, especially after 1910, when pay and conditions for police officers improved. In the first two decades of the 20th century a number of new structures were erected at the Petrie Terrace Police Depot to accommodate the increase. These included:

- a washhouse near the southern boundary of the reserve (timber, 1901, since demolished)
- a residence for the Police Drill Instructor at the southwest corner of the reserve near the junction of Roma Street and Petrie Terrace (timber, 1907, demolished)
- a dormitory block at the northeastern end of the reserve, near the Victoria Barracks boundary (2-storeyed, timber, 1907, demolished)
- a stables building in the northern corner of the reserve, abutting Petrie Terrace and the boundary with Victoria Barracks (brick, 1912, extant)
- extensive additions to No.2 dormitory block (the former gaol kitchen and chapel building) at the southern end of the reserve (1914–15, since demolished)

The 1912 brick stables building contained stables for 40 horses, harness room and feed room. The building was E-shaped with external dimensions of 40 by 26 metres (131 by 85 ft). As motor vehicles gradually replaced horses in police work, alterations to the stables building were undertaken in 1927 to provide some garage accommodation, and in 1936 a substantial brick garage and workshop was erected between the 1912 brick stables building and the 1907 timber dormitory block. At this period the 1912 stables still contained 15 loose boxes and 16 stalls.

In the late 1930s, following decades of police complaint that the buildings at Petrie Terrace were totally unsuitable for police purposes, the Queensland Government finally resolved to address police accommodation at both the Petrie Terrace Police Depot and the Roma Street Police Station and Barracks – the latter erected in 1879, and by 1899 considered inadequate. Early in 1938, work commenced on construction of a new three-storeyed, brick and concrete police barracks at the Petrie Terrace Police Depot, on land formerly utilised as a parade and drill ground. It was intended to accommodate recruits, probationers and single officers stationed at Petrie Terrace, Roma Street, and the Traffic and Criminal Investigation branches in Brisbane. At this period, single officers still were obliged to reside in barracks. When the new barracks were completed in 1939, however, it was occupied only by probationers and single officers – recruits were accommodated in the 1907 timber barracks.

The design for the new barracks was developed after extensive consultation with officers of the Queensland Police Force, with consideration given to providing commodious quarters for unmarried men, and taking advantage of the prominent ridge site to establish a distinctive and forceful presence as a sentinel building overlooking the centre of Brisbane and to the major arterial road of Petrie Terrace. The ground floor comprised offices, store, armoury, guard room, lecture theatre with folding partitions, kitchen and mess. The second and third floors contained bedrooms, bathrooms, drying rooms, and recreation rooms, and accommodated 100 unmarried officers. The first floor contained 18 two-men bedrooms and 4 three-men bedrooms and the second floor accommodated 18 two-men bedrooms and 8 three-men rooms. Every effort was made to provide maximum privacy for the occupants, and to admit as much light and air as possible. The warm Brisbane climate was accommodated with verandahs and balconies on each floor. The building was constructed largely of fireproof materials (brick and cement and fibrous-cement roofing tiles), and enclosed escape stairs were provided at each end of the building.

When the barracks was officially opened on Friday 29 September 1939 by the Minister for Health and Home Affairs Ned Hanlon, it was considered one of the best investments that the Government had made; it would enhance the reputation of the force and give dividends daily in efficient service. The Architectural and Building Journal of Queensland considered that the new barracks represented the new idea in the construction of public buildings, that they were not "institutional" in their appearance, and that they were impressive in their architectural line and mass of brickwork, and the tiled roof makes the building a prominent landmark.

The Police Commissioner, in his report for the year ended 30 June 1939, stated of the new depot barracks: "It is at this centre that a member of the Police force receives his early training prior to his admission as a constable, as well as his accommodation in the early years of his official life. Environment has a great influence on the future career of any person, and it is felt that the change in accommodation as well as the increased facilities for training will benefit both the public and the administration."

Design responsibility for the new Petrie Terrace Police Barracks was assigned to Raymond Clare Nowland, an architect in the Department of Public Works. Nowland had joined the architectural office of the Department of Public Works in November 1932, and was appointed a senior architect in this office in 1938. He produced the most significant buildings of his career between 1932 and 1942, including the Petrie Terrace Police Barracks (1939); University of Queensland Mayne Medical School (1939); Brisbane Dental Hospital and College (1941); Cairns Government Offices (1935); Rockhampton Police Court (1935); Fortitude Valley Police Station (1935); and Toowoomba Police Station (1935).

Construction of the barracks was the first stage of a planned remodelling of the whole of the Petrie Terrace Police Depot and grounds. The scheme provided for a square to the east and southeast of the barracks to incorporate formal gardens, tennis court, residences for senior officers and garaging for cars. In the early 1940s the former Brisbane Gaol buildings on the site, which the police had occupied since 1885, were demolished, the ground filled in and levelled, and a parade ground formed. New garaging was erected at the northeastern end of the site in the early 1950s, but not on the site of the former gaol buildings demolished c. 1940. It appears that no further structures were erected on this part of the site.

The new Petrie Terrace Police Barracks was constructed during an intensive public works building programme undertaken by the Forgan-Smith Labor Government in Queensland during the 1930s, to counter the effects of the economic depression. It was also the first stage of an ambitious building scheme proposed for the Queensland Police Force, which included the demolition of the Roma Street Police Station and Barracks and the transformation of the site into a public square as an extension of King George Square; and new police watchhouse, courthouse and centralised police headquarters buildings in William Street adjoining and incorporating the Public Library (the Library was to be relocated to a proposed new Public Library in Turbot Street). While the Petrie Terrace Police Barracks was erected in 1938–39, the advent of the Second World War diverted resources, and the remainder of the scheme did not come to fruition.

In 1941, just prior to the outbreak of war in the Pacific, a brick building to house the Police Wireless Transmission Station VKR was erected in the southwest corner of the police reserve, on the site of the 1907 Drill Instructor's Residence, which was removed. In conjunction with the wireless station, an aerial was erected at the top of the southern end of the 1938–39 police barracks. Two-way radio communication with wireless patrol vehicles had been established, and the station was linked to the interstate wireless police telegraphy service. Mechanised transportation and radio communication revolutionised Queensland police practices.

During the Second World War, military police attached to the Australian Army, Royal Australian Navy, Royal Australian Air Force, United States Army, United States Shore Patrol, and the Royal Navy, also utilised the police wireless transmission station at Petrie Terrace. The Australian Army and the Royal Australian Navy continued to operate wireless patrol vehicles from this station for some years after the cessation of hostilities in the Pacific.

The war created other impacts on the Petrie Terrace Police Depot. In March 1942 an observation post was established at the depot, manned by members of the Volunteer Air Observers' Corps, who occupied the billiards room on the ground floor of the police barracks. A Royal Australian Air Force hut was erected in the depot grounds to house the office staff attached to this corps. This structure was taken over by the Police in 1946–47, principally to house records and stores, but has been removed since. Also in 1941–42, the surviving stalls in the 1912 stables were removed and the place was converted into a garage.

In the immediate post-war years, Queensland Police acquired wireless equipment from the Civil Defence Organisation, which was installed in a number of suburban police stations to receive broadcasts from station VKR. Improvements to the two-way transmission system in 1946–47 increased the coverage to a 60-mile (97 km) radius of Police Wireless Station VKR. In the late 1940s a 70-foot (21 m) aerial pole was erected in the Petrie Terrace Police Depot grounds to support transmitting aerials for the interstate police wireless service, which became increasingly important as a police tool.

By 1945, the police were experiencing difficulty in accommodating cadets (recruits), probationers and single officers at the Petrie Terrace Depot. Both cadets and probationers were quartered in the 1907 barracks, and in 1949–50 this building was refurbished and a separate laundry building was erected for the use of cadets and probationers.

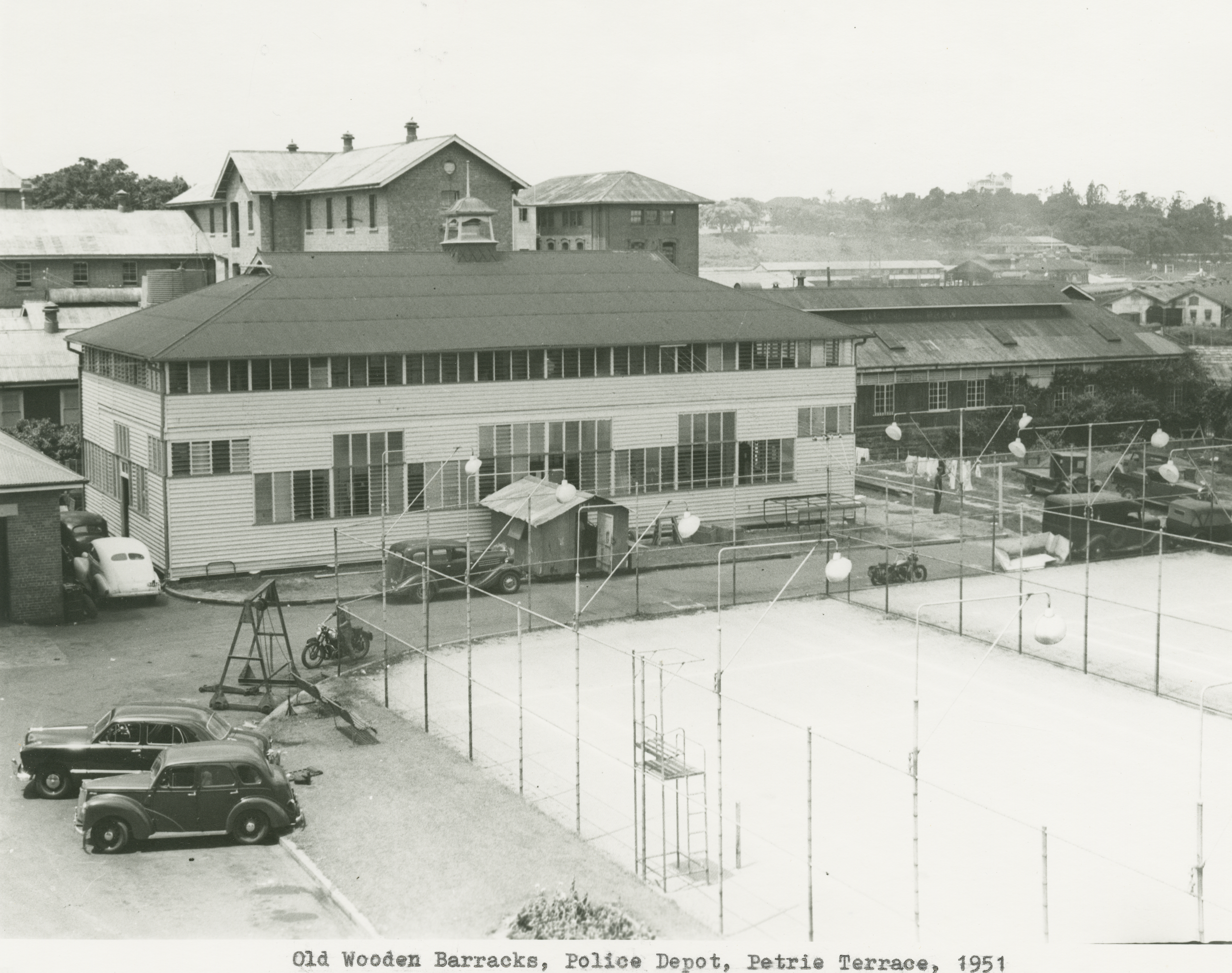
Old wooden barracks, 1951

A number of alterations were made to the Petrie Terrace Depot in the 1950s, reflecting the advent of new technologies and changes in policing practices.

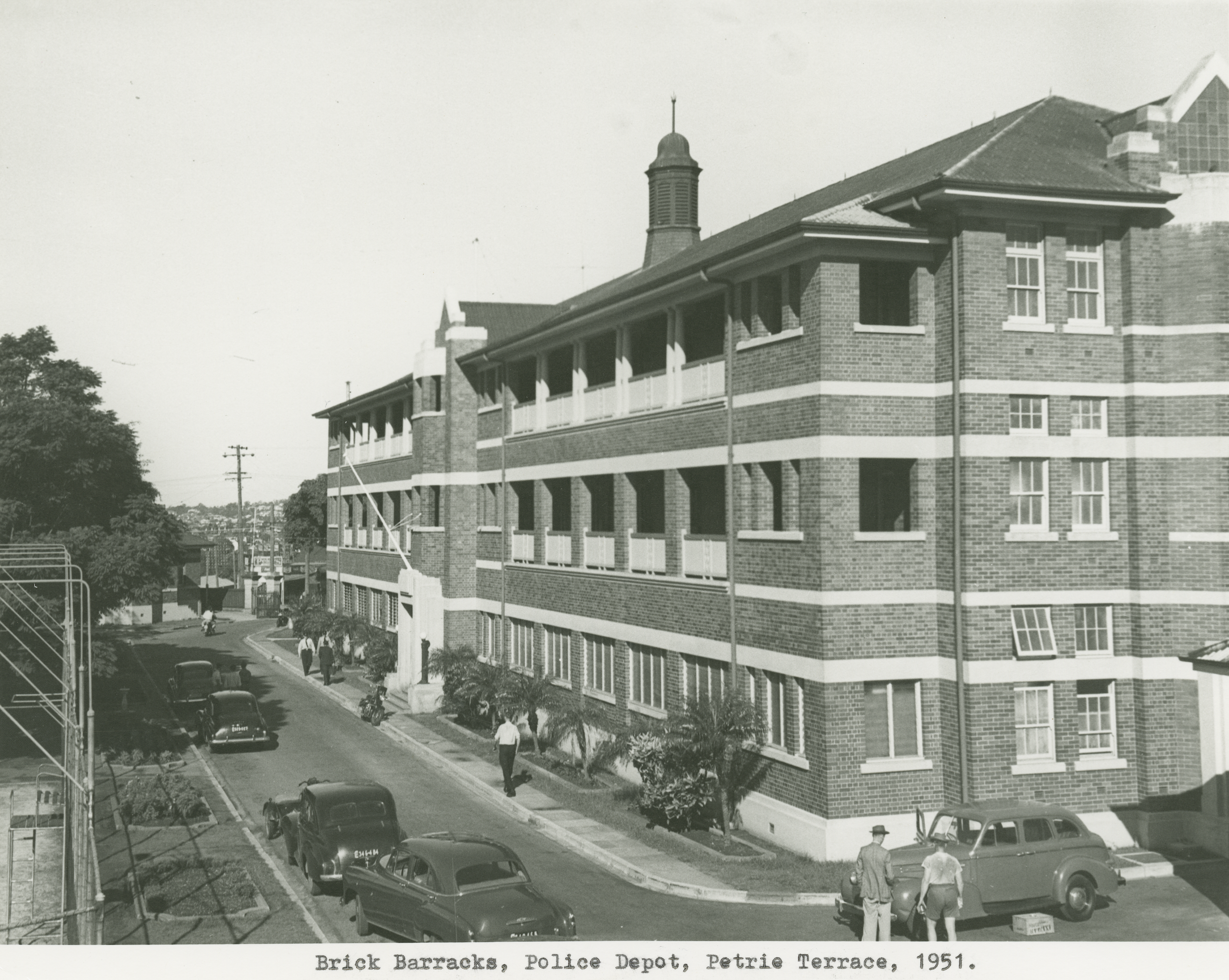
Brick barracks, 1951

In 1951 Brisbane's Central Communications Room at the Criminal Investigations Branch came into operation, taking over the handling of police radio communications from the control room at station VKR, Petrie Terrace. The new facility, which was intended as the "nerve-centre" of police communications in Queensland, was linked to the technical services of station VKR by land lines, and staffed by junior wireless operators. Senior staff supervised all transmissions and reception at the VKR control rooms, and operated the interstate radio telegraphy services.

In 1953 two tennis courts near the 1907 timber barracks were demolished to make way for a large garage which housed 30 vehicles.

In 1956 the bedrooms on the second and third floors of the 1938–39 police barracks were converted into new office accommodation for the Commissioner of Police and Licensing and Special branches. Cadets and single probationers were still housed in the 1907 timber barracks, but single officers were no longer accommodated at the Depot. Also in 1956 the engine room at the rear of the wireless transmission station was enlarged to house a larger emergency power plant for the station. From 1956 a number of structures at the southern end of the site were demolished to create a large open space which was developed as a parade ground.

In the early 1960s the Police Commissioner's and several other offices accommodated at Petrie Terrace moved into the newly opened Police Headquarters Building at North Quay. At Petrie Terrace, the 1938–39 building was re-converted into barracks, necessitating only minor alterations, and the 1907 barracks was removed. By 1964 the 1938–39 building contained accommodation for probationers and cadets on the first and second floors, and offices (including Inspector and Sub-Inspector of Police), class rooms and mess on the ground floor. Also by 1964, the transmission and reception of police messages had been transferred from Petrie Terrace to the North Quay building, and the Petrie Terrace wireless transmission station was being used principally for the housing of equipment and for workshop repair rooms.

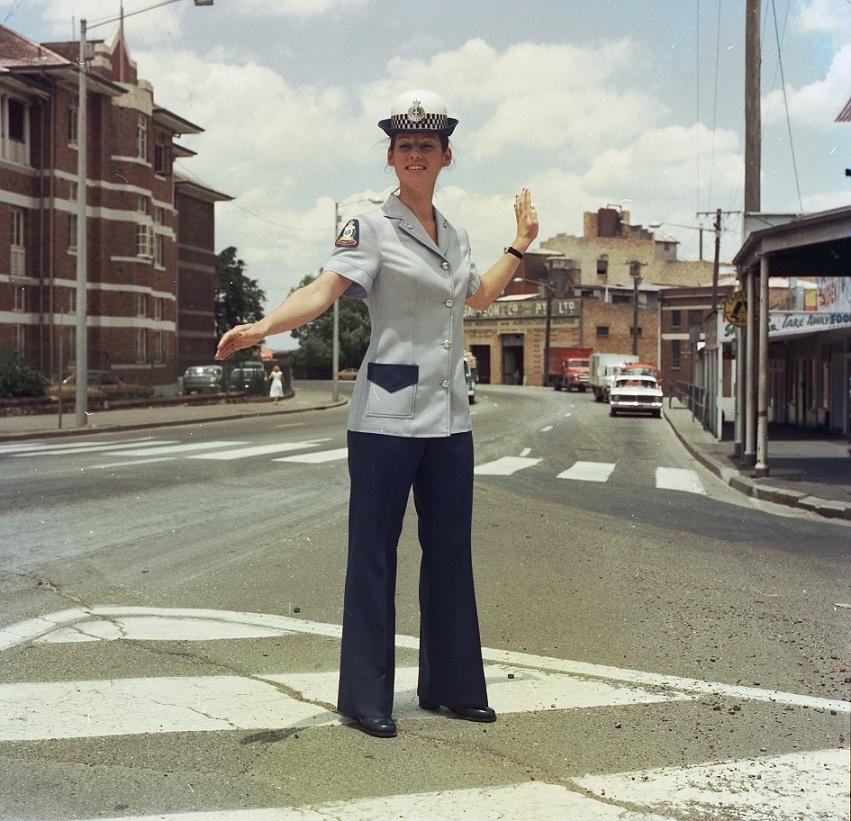
Constable Diana Hotchkis models the new female summer uniform consisting of a light blue safari jacket with dark blue pockets and bell bottom slacks outside the police barracks, 1979

Use of the Petrie Terrace Police Depot as a training facility ceased in 1973 when this function was removed to the Oxley Police Academy, but the Depot continued to serve other police purposes until the mid-1980s. In 1987 the Queensland Government sold the former police reserve and buildings to private enterprise, and approval for re-zoning was gazetted in September 1990. A number of structures have been removed from the site, including the 1953 garage building and several structures at the northeastern end of the site; the former Police Stables functioned as the Underground Nightclub through the 1990s; and the former Police Wireless Transmission Station was converted into a restaurant. The former Police Barracks remained vacant until the late 2000s and suffered a high level of vandalism. The open area to the east and southeast of the former Police Barracks, which contains significant sub-surface material associated with the former Brisbane Gaol (1860–1883), became a carpark.

In 2007–08, the entire Police Depot precinct, including the three surviving structures in the barracks, stables and wireless transmission station, was renovated and redeveloped as a retail and commercial precinct named "The Barracks". The redevelopment won UDIA Awards for Urban Renewal and best large Retail/Commercial development The site now contains a Coles supermarket, a range of eateries, bars, restaurants and shops, and the Palace Cinemas at The Barracks.

== Description ==
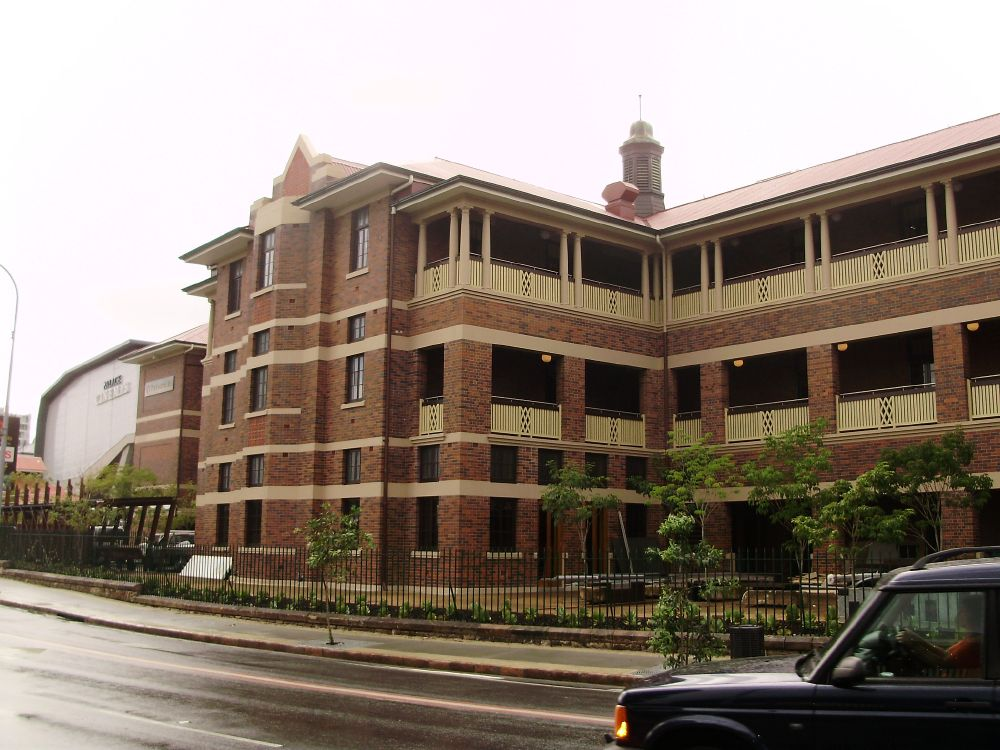
View of the redeveloped Petrie Terrace Police Depot as seen from the Petrie Terrace (street) outside, 2009

The former Petrie Terrace Police Depot occupies the southwest edge of a ridge which overlooks the former Roma Street railway yards and the Brisbane central business district. It is bounded on the southeast by the Brisbane-Ipswich railway, on the southwest by Upper Roma Street, on the northwest by Petrie Terrace, and on the northeast by Victoria Barracks military reserve. It contains a number of significant elements, including:

=== The former Petrie Terrace Police Barracks ===
The former police barracks is highly visible from a number of vantage points around the Brisbane CBD, the former Petrie Terrace Police Barracks is a prominent landmark on a ridge overlooking the Roma Street Railway Yards and provides an impressive presence to Petrie Terrace. The place is important for views to and from the site including to/from Upper Roma Street, William Jolly Bridge and the Brisbane River, the riverside expressway, the Brisbane CBD, inner western suburbs such as from Cairns Terrace, Red Hill and from Petrie Terrace, Milton Road, Caxton Street and Victoria Barracks.

Opened in 1939, the former Petrie Terrace Police Barracks is a three-storey brick and concrete building in red face brick with contrasting horizontal banding in rendered concrete. The roof is sheeted with corrugated fibro cement tiles. The main elevation to the southeast is a single range, symmetrical about a narrow, faceted projecting parapeted central entrance. The modest entrance to the ground floor is approached by a set of concrete stairs to a covered entry porch opening into the main entrance lobby ahead. The central block is flanked to each side by verandahs to each floor. The elevation to Petrie Terrace is symmetrical about a hip-roofed projecting and faceted central bay flanked by verandahed wings which terminate in prominent hip-roofed blank end pavilions. The blank ends contain recessed rectangular panels to each floor level giving shadow and texture to the exterior walls. The faceting of the central bay forms a full-length oriel-like window-bay suggestive of defensiveness. A prominent roof ventilator is located to the centre of the main roof. The second floor verandahs to both elevations are punctuated by pairs of Doric columns with battened timber balustrading with decorative criss-cross central panels. The verandahs to the ground and first floors have similar balustrading punctuated by solid brick piers. The projecting eaves around the building are timber-lined. Other detailing includes decorative terracotta tile panels to the projecting parapet fronts to each elevation and vertical bands of incised arrows to the concrete door surrounds to the north, south and east entrances.

The southwest and northeast elevations are symmetrical about faceted parapeted blocks flanked by two bays of timber sash windows with the verandah ends and the fire escape stair block to the corners.

The central projecting parapets to each elevation contain panels of terracotta tiles with a stylised diamond pattern to each tile. The moulded concrete door surrounds to the north, south and east entrances have vertical bands of an arrow pattern to the upper corners.

The building is planned about a central staircase opening off the main entrance hall. The entrance and stair treads are finished in different shades of terrazzo. The stair has a moulded timber handrail, decorative timber newels and decorative wrought iron balustrading. The openings to the main stairwell on each level have large decorative consoles. The walls and partitions are of brick; the verandah floors, corridors and staircases are of concrete; and the roof is sheeted with corrugated fibro cement tiles. Internal walls are rendered and painted. Ceilings to corridors and ground and first floor verandahs are concrete. Ceilings to internal spaces on each floor, stairwells and the second floor verandahs are lined with fibro cement sheeting with timber cover strips. On the ground floor, offices and storage open off a central corridor to the northeast, former mess and kitchen area open off a small corridor to the south west and toilet blocks are positioned at each end of the building. The lecture theatre is accommodated in the projecting wing to the northwest opening off the verandah. This room retains the original timber folding doors. The first and second floors are organised about a central corridor off the central staircase. Bedrooms open off the central corridor and have doors with tilting glass fanlights opening to the verandahs. Toilets, bathrooms and drying rooms are located at each end of the building on both floors. On the first floor the projecting northwest wing accommodates the recreation room and on the second floor additional bedrooms.

The building was not secured and was subject to continual vandalism and many of the windows and doors were damaged or removed as have a large percentage of the ceiling linings. The internal spatial relations remain substantially intact including the configuration of the bedrooms, lecture theatre, recreation room, bathrooms and drying rooms, kitchen and office spaces. The plain concrete escape stairs and main terrazzo stair remain intact. The verandah posts and balustrading are substantially intact.

=== The former stables ===
The former stables at the former Petrie Terrace Police Depot are located on the north-western site boundary line opposite Caxton Street. The building is constructed of single storey brick masonry with a hipped corrugated red Colorbond roof with ventilated ridges.

The building, which was partly converted into garage accommodation in the late 1920s and fully in 1941–42, has been more recently refurbished as a night club. The floor now has several different level changes and the original floor finish is not evident. The render to the interior walls has been largely removed and there have been several partition walls, bar areas, stage areas and toilet facilities constructed within the building. The south-western wing of the former E-shaped building was demolished prior to the night club refurbishment with the exception of a section of the projecting eastern wall which survives and contains an early timber framed and clad pair of doors. The voids which housed horse then car washing areas between the wings of the E-shaped building have been enclosed together with the area to the south east between the stables building and the former police garage and workshop constructed in 1936.

At the north western corner of the building a basement level has been more recently added through the underpinning of the original walls and the addition of a new end wall and contains several different floor levels.

Early fabric that survives include the majority of the perimeter walls which are constructed of English bonded brickwork. These walls have arrised corners to openings and engaged piers in the form of bull nosed brickwork to prevent injury. Several of the original openings in external walls are apparent including the bricked in windows to the Petrie Terrace elevation which correspond and provide evidence of the location of the stalls and loose boxes that were positioned along that elevation. Other elements include the roof structure of substantial timber trusses and large timber framed louvred ventilators to each of the ridges. The timber posts supporting the trusses to the central wing demonstrate where the former stalls and timber partition walls were located.

=== The former garage and workshop ===
The former garage and workshop constructed adjacent to the Stables building in 1936 is a single-storey brick masonry structure with a corrugated red Colorbond gambrel roof with timber lined eaves. It has also been refurbished as part of the nightclub. The floor and ceiling have been relined, the internal render largely removed and window openings in the north-western wall have been converted to door openings. The openings in the other perimeter walls survive intact. Remnant masonry internal partition walls to the former office area survive. The building has an infill of bar and food preparation areas, cold rooms and stores.

=== The former police wireless transmission station (VKR) ===
The former police wireless transmission station is a brick masonry building with metal roof constructed adjacent to the Petrie Terrace boundary near the intersection of Milton Road and has a large addition of recent construction along its north-eastern side. The interior and much of the exterior have been highly modified. This building is not included within the heritage listing boundary for the entry in the Queensland Heritage Register for the former Petrie Terrace Police Depot.

=== Other site elements ===
A wrought iron fence on a stone base runs along the boundary to Petrie Terrace. A gate post remains to the former vehicle entrance to the Barracks from Petrie Terrace with evidence of gate hinges. There is a retaining wall of roughly dressed sandstone, laid in courses, along the boundary between the former police and military reserves, at the northeast end of the site. The former square to the southeast now contains a bitumened open carpark.

== Heritage listing ==
The former Petrie Terrace Police Depot was listed on the Queensland Heritage Register on 23 July 1999 having satisfied the following criteria.

The place is important in demonstrating the evolution or pattern of Queensland's history.

The former Petrie Terrace Police Depot is important historically for its long association with penal and police activity in Brisbane, and is an important component of a precinct of penal, military, and police buildings established from 1860.

Within the former Petrie Terrace Police Depot there are elements with specific cultural heritage significance. These include:

- sub-surface remnants of the former Brisbane Gaol (1860–1883), which have strong historical, social and archaeological significance
- the stone retaining wall between the police and military reserves, which has aesthetic value engendered by the rustic material, and is important historically as remnant stone from the wall of the former Brisbane Gaol on this site.
- the wrought iron and stone fence to the Petrie Terrace street frontage, which is important as remains of the stone walling of the second Brisbane Gaol perimeter, and for its aesthetic contribution to the Petrie Terrace streetscape
- the 1912 police stables which, despite late 20th century modification, is still illustrative of its type, has a strong aesthetic appeal engendered by the materials, forms and the interior spaces, and remains important surviving evidence of the nature of police work in Queensland prior to the introduction of mechanised transportation
- the 1936 police garage and workshop, which, despite late 20th century modification, is still illustrative of its type, and remains important in illustrating early adaptations to mechanised transportation in the interwar years of the 20th century, along with the impact of mechanised transportation on the nature of policing in Queensland at this period.

The place demonstrates rare, uncommon or endangered aspects of Queensland's cultural heritage.

The 1938–39 police barracks is a rare example of urban residential accommodation provided for unmarried police officers in the first half of the 20th century.

The place has potential to yield information that will contribute to an understanding of Queensland's history.

As the site of the second Brisbane Gaol, the place has the potential to yield information from archaeological deposits that would contribute to an understanding of Queensland's history, particularly aspects of the history of punishment and prisons in colonial Queensland. The now open area to the east and southeast is important as the site of many of the Gaol structures and yards. This area is also important as the grounds associated with the former Police Barracks, accommodating residences for senior officers, garaging, parade areas and tennis courts. The sub-surface remnants of the former Brisbane Gaol (1860–1883), which have strong historical, social and archaeological significance.

The place is important in demonstrating the principal characteristics of a particular class of cultural places.

The former Police Stables, former Police Garage and Workshop, former Police Barracks, former Police Wireless Transmission Station VKR, the perimeter stone and wrought iron wall along the Petrie Terrace frontage to the former Petrie Terrace Police Depot, and the stone retaining wall between the military and police reserves at the northern end of the site, form a cohesive group of buildings and structures, which together contribute to our understanding of the nature of police training and administration in Queensland in the first half of the 20th century.

Within the former Petrie Terrace Police Depot there are elements with specific cultural heritage significance. These include:

- the 1912 police stables which, despite late 20th century modification, is still illustrative of its type, has a strong aesthetic appeal engendered by the materials, forms and the interior spaces, and remains important surviving evidence of the nature of police work in Queensland prior to the introduction of mechanised transportation
- the 1936 police garage and workshop, which, despite late 20th century modification, is still illustrative of its type, and remains important in illustrating early adaptations to mechanised transportation in the interwar years of the 20th century, along with the impact of mechanised transportation on the nature of policing in Queensland at this period

The place is important because of its aesthetic significance.

The former Police Stables, former Police Garage and Workshop, former Police Barracks, former Police Wireless Transmission Station VKR, the perimeter stone and wrought iron wall along the Petrie Terrace frontage to the former Petrie Terrace Police Depot, and the stone retaining wall between the military and police reserves at the northern end of the site, form a cohesive group of buildings and structures, which together contribute to our understanding of the nature of police training and administration in Queensland in the first half of the 20th century. They have aesthetic value, and make an important contribution to the streetscape of Petrie Terrace.

Within the former Petrie Terrace Police Depot there are elements with specific cultural heritage significance. These include:

- the stone retaining wall between the police and military reserves, which has aesthetic value engendered by the rustic material, and is important historically as remnant stone from the wall of the former Brisbane Gaol on this site
- the wrought iron and stone fence to the Petrie Terrace street frontage, which is important as remains of the stone walling of the second Brisbane Gaol perimeter, and for its aesthetic contribution to the Petrie Terrace streetscape
- the 1912 police stables which, despite late 20th century modification, is still illustrative of its type, has a strong aesthetic appeal engendered by the materials, forms and the interior spaces, and remains important surviving evidence of the nature of police work in Queensland prior to the introduction of mechanised transportation

The 1938–39 police barracks place has aesthetic value. The patterning of the facades in bands of red facebrick and imitation stone render give the building a lively, defensive quality in a style reminiscent of the Arts and Crafts movement. The detailing includes decorative terracotta tile panels to the projecting parapet fronts to each elevation and vertical bands of incised arrows to the concrete door surrounds to the north, south and east entrances.

Highly visible from a number of vantage points around Brisbane City, the 1938–39 police barracks is a prominent landmark on a ridge overlooking the Brisbane central business district and former Roma Street Railway Yards, and is an impressive presence in Petrie Terrace. The place is important for views to and from the site including to/from Upper Roma Street, William Jolly Bridge and the Brisbane River, the Riverside Expressway, the Brisbane CBD, the inner western suburbs (such as from Cairns Terrace, Red Hill), and from Petrie Terrace, Milton Road, Caxton Street and Victoria Barracks.

The place has a strong or special association with a particular community or cultural group for social, cultural or spiritual reasons.

The sub-surface remnants of the former Brisbane Gaol (1860–1883) have strong historical, social and archaeological significance

The place has a special association with the life or work of a particular person, group or organisation of importance in Queensland's history.

The former Petrie Terrace Police Depot is important for its association with the Queensland Police Force, demonstrating the evolution of work practices and the changing nature of the lifestyle associated with police force employment in a major urban centre.

The 1938–39 police barracks is important as the only building to be realised from an ambitious building program of prestigious police buildings proposed for Brisbane City under the extensive public works building programme of the Forgan-Smith government of the 1930s. The 1938–39 police barracks is important also for its association with the work of the Department of Public Works, and in particular for its association with the work of architect Raymond Clare Nowland. It is one of the most notable buildings designed by Nowland, an architect of considerable talent working in the Department of Public Works during the period of extensive public works building in the 1930s.
