= Baroona Hall =

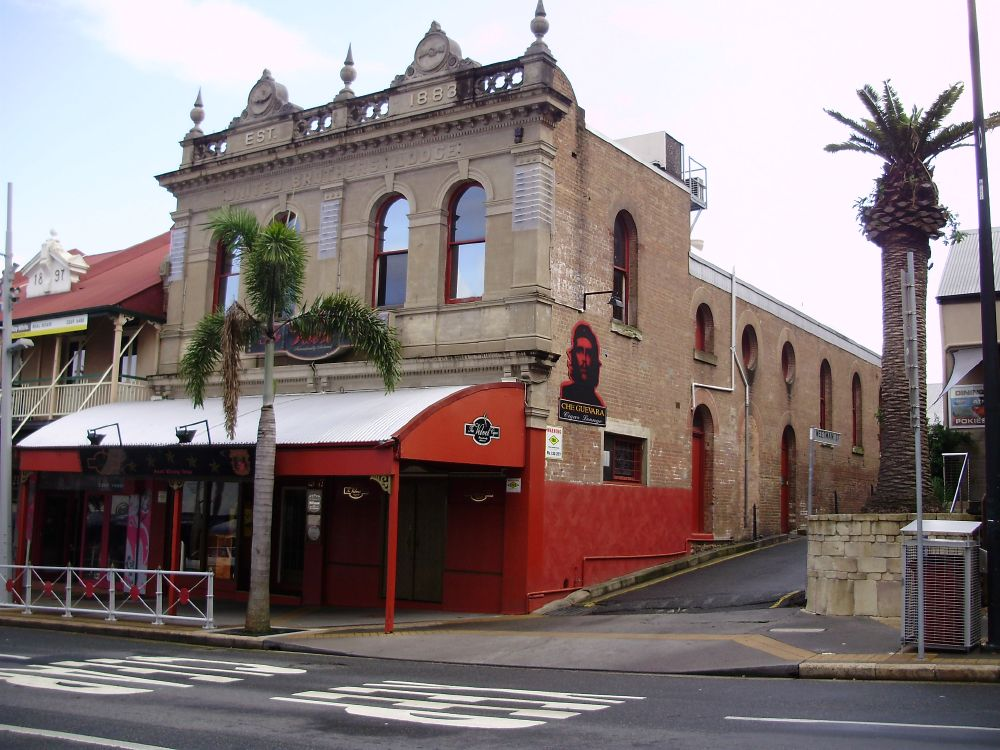
- Baroona Hall, 2009

- Location within Queensland Location within Australia
- 27.4645°S 153.0131°E
- Location: 15–17 Caxton Street, Petrie Terrace, City of Brisbane, Queensland, Australia

History
- Design period: 1870s–1890s (late 19th century)
- Built: 1883–1884

Site notes
- Architect: Richard Gailey
- Architectural style: Classicism

Queensland Heritage Register
- Official name: Baroona Labor Hall, Caxton Street Hall, Josephsons Clothing Factory, United Brothers Lodge
- Type: state heritage (built)
- Designated: 21 October 1992
- Reference no.: 600277
- Significant period: 1883–1884 (fabric); 1884–1916, 1918–1936, 1949–1980s (historical); 1884–ongoing (social)
- Significant components: shop/s
- Builders: James Stuart Martin

Baroona Hall is a heritage-listed community hall at 15–17 Caxton Street, Petrie Terrace, City of Brisbane, Queensland, Australia. It was designed by Richard Gailey and built from 1883 to 1884 by James Stuart Martin. It is also known as Caxton Street Hall, Josephsons Clothing Factory, and United Brothers Lodge. It was added to the Queensland Heritage Register on 21 October 1992.

== History ==
Baroona Hall is a two-storey brick hall constructed in 1884 to a design by Richard Gailey for the United Brothers Lodge of the Manchester Unity Independent Order of Oddfellows. The building reflects the need for larger premises as membership increases and the desire of the organisation to convey a sense of permanence and stability to its members.

Oddfellows societies were established in 17th century England after the demise of the medieval guilds left the working classes completely unprotected in the advent of illness or injury. This led to the formation of friendly societies who banded together to provide, by their own exertions and from their own slender resources, some of the medical and other essential services they lacked. Halls were often constructed by the societies, both as a venue for society meetings, and for use by the community for entertainments, lectures and public and political meetings.

There are three orders of Oddfellows, the largest of which is the Manchester Unity Independent Order of Oddfellows (MUIOOF). This Order was first established in 1813 in Manchester, spreading rapidly through the industrial north of England and then throughout the whole country.

The first Oddfellows lodge in Australia was formed in 1840 in Sydney by C M Crighton who was previously a brother of a lodge in Manchester. On 21 August 1847, an advertisement was placed in the Brisbane Courier to those residents who may be desirous of becoming members of the Society of Oddfellows proposed to be established in Brisbane.

A lodge was subsequently formed and by 1874, there were twenty two lodges throughout Queensland. Prior to this date, Queensland lodges had been managed as branches of New South Wales lodges; however in 1874, they were granted separation.

The Loyal United Brothers Lodge, Manchester Unity Independent Order of Oddfellows was established by eleven Brisbane men in 1873. The inaugural meeting was held in the Lennenberg Hotel in Queen Street, and subsequent meetings were held at the Baptist Hall. Many of the foundation members were employed at Smellies Foundry, and others included draymen, wood carvers, and coachmen.

In 1878, the lodge purchased land in Caxton Street for £257 and due to increases in membership, decided to erect a hall. The sum of £1800 was borrowed towards the cost of construction which amounted to £1850. Together with furniture and regalia, the total cost was approximately £2400. The building was designed by Richard Gailey and constructed by James Stuart Martin, a leading member of the lodge. Construction began in 1883, and the opening was celebrated in February 1884.

The design incorporated two shops in the front of the building with a hall at the rear, which was entered from the lane at the side of the building. The hall featured a stage and a gallery, with a lodge room and ante room above the shops.

Richard Gailey, the architect, was one of Queensland's most prolific architects. Born in Ireland in 1834, he emigrated to Australia in 1864. Referred to as the doyen of Brisbane's architects, he is responsible for the design of many substantial buildings, both commercial and residential, as well as other society halls including an Oddfellows Hall at Fortitude Valley and a Masonic Hall at Toowong.

The hall was utilised by the lodge and the community for a number of years and the shops were continually occupied by a number of small businesses including bakers, stationers, hairdressers, bootmakers and drapers.

However, the economic downturn of the 1890s severely overstretched the resources of the lodge, forcing the society to lease the premises to a commercial tenant.

In 1918, the hall was leased to Isidor Josephson, a clothing manufacturer. Josephson entered the clothing business in Brisbane at the age of 21, and built a substantial business which eventually extended to most other states. His factory premises at Caxton Street were used as an example of bright, airy factories, fitted with machinery which enlightens the labour (in Barton's Jubilee History of Queensland (1909)).

The lodge continued to meet upstairs until 1916 when they moved to the BAFS Dispensary in George Street.

The society sold the Caxton Street hall in 1928; however Josephson remained as tenant until 1936 when he moved to new premises in Roma Street. The building remained vacant until the Second World War when it was occupied by the Defence Department Stationer and a hairdresser. It was then vacant again until 1949, when one shop was let by a tailor and the remainder of the building was occupied as the Baroona Labour Hall. The building has also been utilised as a Sunday Market, and the lodge room was used by the Caxton Street Legal Services from 1976. At some stage by 1980, one of the shops was converted into the entrance to the hall.

In the late 1980s, the hall was converted for use as a nightclub, and although it has changed hands and images a number of times, it remains in this use.

== Description ==
Baroona Hall is located at the corner of Caxton and Cathie Streets. Constructed of face brick, with a cement rendered front facade and neo-classical detailing, it is located on a sloping site, resulting in it being two storeys at the front and one storey at the rear.

Located within a row of 19th century buildings, it has a dominant streetscape presence.

The two-storey building has a rendered facade with remnants of paint in some areas and a shop and entrance to the hall at street level. The building is divided by central and end pillars, two of which have had the tiles and render removed to expose badly damaged bricks.

The shop, of which the tenant is a tailor, is located on the side nearest Cathie Street. It has a central recessed entrance, with steel framed display windows on either side. There appears to have been few alterations internally. Signage for the store follows the tradition of hand painted signage on the front and end elevations of the awning.

The other side of the front elevation incorporates the entrance to the hall, which is located to one side of the central pillar. The remaining space has been boarded up.

A curved corrugated iron awning is located over the footpath, supported by three timber posts. Above the awning, the facade is symmetrically arranged, with central and end pilasters. Within the bays on either side of the central pilaster are pairs of semi circular arched windows. Above this section is a panel running the width of the building with the words UNITED BROTHERS LODGE in relief. This is capped with a stone entablature below a parapet featuring an open circular pattern. The parapet is divided by short pedestals surmounted by substantial finials. Between these are two pediments with decorative scrollwork and the badly weathered letters MUI on one and OOF on the other. The uppermost part of the pediments have circular elements featuring symbolic elements of the Oddfellows, including a dove and hands shaking.

The elevation to Cathie Street is exposed face brick, with a series of circular and semi circular arched windows. The first three (a small semi circular arched window and two circular windows) are located above three doors with semi circular arched brick headers, of which the central one has been bricked in. Four elongated semi circular arched windows are evenly spaced along the remainder of the elevation. These align with identical windows on the opposite elevation, which are currently boarded up.

The rear of the building is one storey high. It comprises a gable end with a central door flanked by two semi-circular arched windows. The windows are boarded up and obscured by a new brick toilet block. The roof is newly sheeted in galvanised iron, with two decorative ventilators located along the ridge. A chimney is evident towards the front of the building.

Internally, the new entrance leads to a set of stairs which access the main hall. The walls are plastered and painted, with a shadow line at dado height, which steps up around the location of the original stage. New timber floor boards have been laid over the original boards. The ceiling is of tongue and groove boarding with iron tie rods and is horizontal in the centre and follows the slope of the roof line at the sides. The boarding has been covered with sound proofing materials and is obscured by air conditioning ducts and light and sound apparatus. A new stage on a number of levels is constructed over new toilets at the rear of the hall, and a bar with a mezzanine level above is located along the Cathie Street side.

Stairs, possibly with the original timber balustrading lead to the former lodge room from the entrance area. Original doors are located at each end of the wall facing the mezzanine level, with a chimney breast centrally positioned in the same wall. The room has plastered walls and a new tongue and groove boarded ceiling. A bar is located on either side of the wall at the Cathie Street end.

Original joinery details survive in most parts of the hall.

== Heritage listing ==
Baroona Labor Hall was listed on the Queensland Heritage Register on 21 October 1992 having satisfied the following criteria.

The place is important in demonstrating the evolution or pattern of Queensland's history.

Baroona Hall was constructed between 1883 and 1884 by the United Brothers Lodge, Manchester Unity Independent Order of Oddfellows. The lodge was established in 1873, to meet the needs of a large working class population without protection against injury, illness or other hardships. The construction of the hall demonstrates the pattern of Queensland's history by being representative of the considerable and necessary service supplied by Friendly Societies in the 19th and early 20th century community.

The place demonstrates rare, uncommon or endangered aspects of Queensland's cultural heritage.

The building is also an uncommon example of a cement rendered building which is unpainted, and also of surviving 1950s style signage to the awning.

The place is important in demonstrating the principal characteristics of a particular class of cultural places.

The hall demonstrates the principal characteristics of an Oddfellows Hall, including symbols of the society and the division of space into hall, gallery, stage and lodge room. The inclusion of retail premises in front of the hall was also a relatively common feature of community halls.

The place is important because of its aesthetic significance.

Baroona Hall has substantial aesthetic significance, both individually, and as part of the streetscape. This is contributed to by the high degree of design, workmanship and materials.

The place has a strong or special association with a particular community or cultural group for social, cultural or spiritual reasons.

The hall has special association with many members of the community, including past and present members of the United Brothers Lodge, and with community groups who used the hall such as the Caxton Street Legal Service. It also has special association with the Australian Labour Party, who used the hall as their branch headquarters from the mid 1940s and are still the owners.

The place has a special association with the life or work of a particular person, group or organisation of importance in Queensland's history.

Baroona Hall is also associated with Brisbane architect, Richard Gailey as an example of his work. Gailey was a prolific architect who designed many notable commercial and residential buildings. He also designed other society halls, including an Oddfellows Hall in Fortitude Valley and a Masonic Hall at Toowong.
