= Caxton Street Seafood and Wine Festival =

Annual event in Brisbane, Queensland, Australia

Caxton Street Festival.
- Genre: community festival
- Dates: June
- Locations: Brisbane, Queensland, Australia
- Years active: Since 1994
- Founded: 1994
- Website: www.caxtonstreet.com.au

The Caxton Street Seafood and Wine Festival is an annual event in Brisbane, Queensland, Australia. It was founded in 1994 by the Caxton Street Development Association to promote Caxton Street, in historic Petrie Terrace, as an area for Australian music, food and drink, plus art and history. The area is near to the Suncorp Stadium and the Brisbane central business district.

The festival was held annually on the Sunday of the Labour Day long weekend in May, until 2013; since 2014, it has been held on the Queen's Birthday long weekend in June.

By 2012, the festival had attracted more than 15,000 patrons. Ticket proceeds were donated to various Queensland charities (in 2012 to the Wesley Hospital Kim Walters Choices Program).

== Music festival ==
As well as promoting Queensland food and wine, it includes a music festival. Since 1994, featured artists have included Russell Crowe and 30 Odd Foot of Grunts, 1927, Boom Crash Opera, The Angels, Gang Gajang, Little Birdy, Grace Knight, Kevin Borich, Kram of Spiderbait, Dukes of Windsor, Calling All Cars, Don Walker, Tyrone Noonan and Diana Anaid plus celebrities from Australian Idol and Big Brother.

== Organisation ==
From 2003 to 2014, Manny Kyriakidis of the Pushworth Group produced the event's music programmes. From 2009 to 2014, Nichola Burton of Australian Festival Management managed the annual festival; Sam Kyriakidis of Pressing Issues was the publicist. Due to illness, the Pushworth team took a break for 2015 and 2016.

== 2010-11 Queensland floods ==
In 2011, inspired by the 2010–11 Queensland floods, Queensland artist Donna Hawkins produced an artwork representation of Caxton Street for the festival. The festival raised funds for the Premier's Disaster Relief Appeal in 2011, and donated some proceeds to the Queensland Floods Appeal 2013.

== See also ==
- Culture of Brisbane
- List of festivals in Brisbane
- List of festivals in Australia
