= Caxton Street, Brisbane =

Street in Brisbane, Australia

Caxton Street Queensland
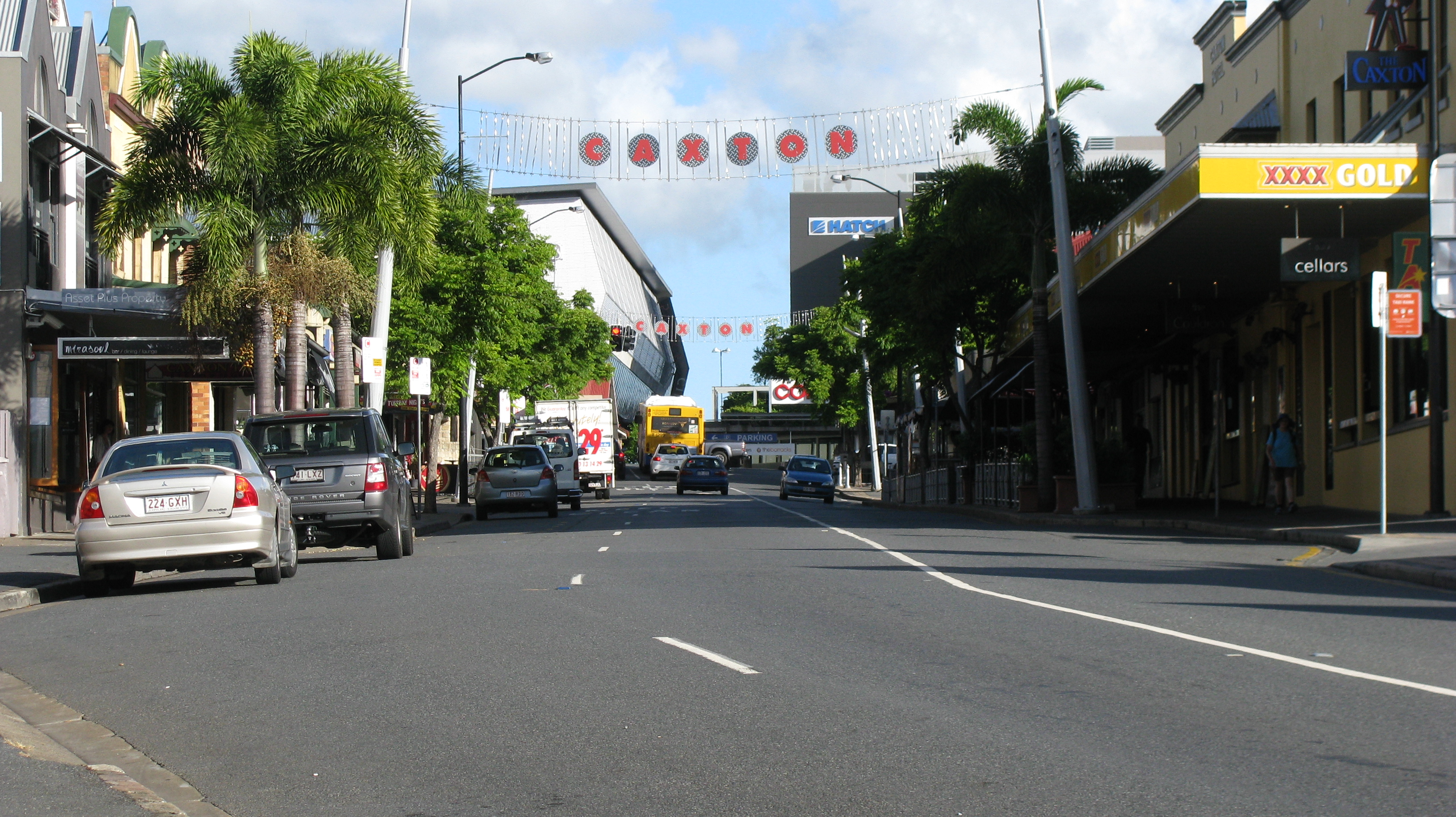
- Caxton Street, looking towards the Brisbane CBD.
- Coordinates: 27.464525°S 153.012767°E

General information
- Type: Street
- Location: Brisbane
- Length: 500 m (0.3 mi)

Major junctions
- West end: Given Terrace
- Inner City Bypass (M3)
- East end: Petrie Terrace (State Route 10) Petrie Terrace

Caxton Street is a street in the inner suburb of Petrie Terrace in Brisbane, Queensland, Australia. The street forms part of the Petrie Terrace Heritage Trail, and is notable for its many pubs and hotels, as well as its close proximity to Lang Park.

== History ==
Named after merchant, writer and printer William Caxton, the thoroughfare developed considerably alongside the subdivision of land in the 1860s. The ensuing decades saw the construction of The Caxton Hotel (1864), the Baroona Oddfellows hall (1883) and the Prince Alfred Hotel (1887). An electric tramline was constructed between 1897 and 1898. The Ithaca Baths were constructed around 1905.

In order to ease congestion, the street was grade-separated at its intersection with Hale Street in the 1960s.

Since the 1980s, Caxton Street has established itself as a thriving nightlife precinct, with an array of nightclubs, restaurants and live entertainment venues. The Caxton Street Seafood and Wine Festival has been held in the street annually since 1994. Caxton Street is also famous for the 'running of the buses', an annual event during the National Rugby League's State of Origin series, at which thousands of fans flock to the street in order to cheer their team's bus and boo their respective opposition as they proceed to Lang Park.

During the 2014 G-20 Brisbane summit, Burmese president Thein Sein and German chancellor Angela Merkel, as well as delegates of the United Nations, reportedly stayed at Gambaro's Hotel, located on the street. During her visit, Merkel stopped in at bars on Caxton Street and posed for photos with locals. During this time a strong police presence was present on Caxton Street, along with a high protective steel and perspex barrier outside the hotel.

== See also ==
- Caxton Street Seafood and Wine Festival
