= Petrie Terrace =

- Suburb
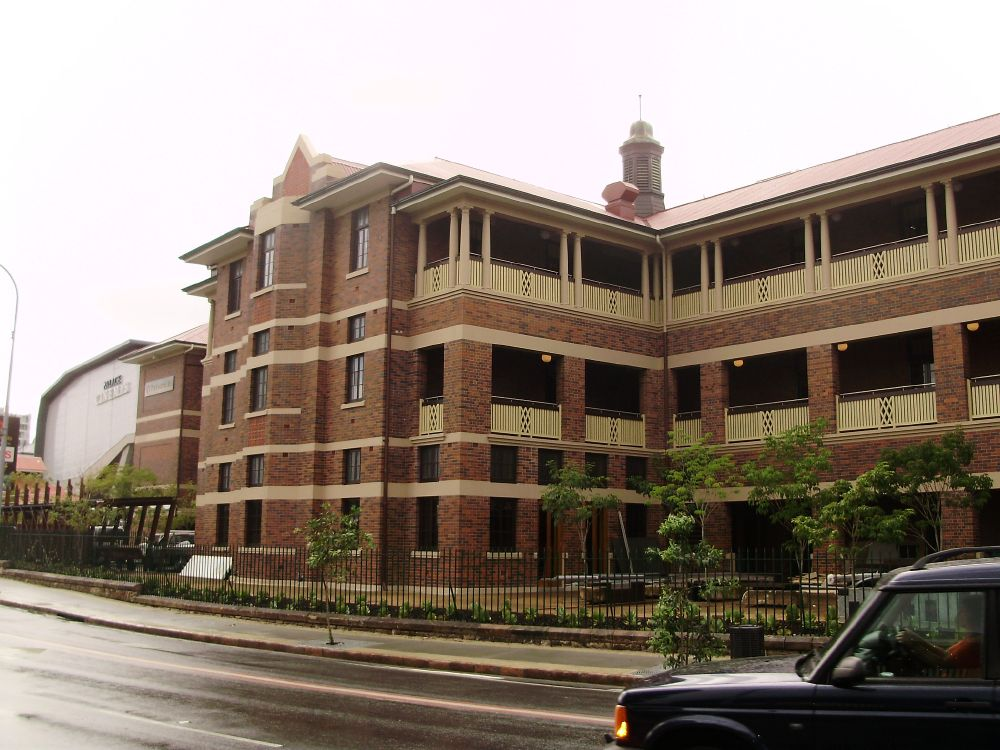
- Former police barracks

- Interactive map of Petrie Terrace
- Coordinates: 27.4632°S 153.0132°E
- Country: Australia
- State: Queensland
- City: Brisbane
- LGA: City of Brisbane (Paddington Ward)
- Location: 2.5 km (1.6 mi) W of Brisbane CBD

Government
  - State electorate: McConnel
  - Federal division: Brisbane

Area
  - Total: 0.3 km^{2} (0.12 sq mi)
- Elevation: 32 m (105 ft)

Population
  - Total: 1,168 (2021 census)
  - Density: 3,900/km^{2} (10,100/sq mi)
- Time zone: UTC+10:00 (AEST)
- Postcode: 4000
Suburbs around Petrie Terrace
Paddington	Red Hill	Kelvin Grove; Spring Hill
Paddington	Petrie Terrace	Brisbane City
Milton	Brisbane City	Brisbane City

Petrie Terrace is an inner suburb in the City of Brisbane, Queensland, Australia. In the 2021 census, Petrie Terrace had a population of 1,168 people.

== Geography ==
The suburb is 2.5 kilometres (1.6 mi) by road west of the Brisbane General Post Office. The precinct is bordered to the west by Hale Street and to the east by Countess Street. Its northern boundary is Musgrave Road and its southern is Milton Road and Upper Roma Street.

== History ==
=== 19th century ===
The suburb takes its name from the road of the same name, which was in turn named after the pioneer Petrie family, headed by Andrew Petrie.

On Sunday 18 December 1864, a small building on Petrie Terrace was inaugurated for Baptist services and Sunday School. In January 1895 a new Petrie Terrace Baptist church opened on the corner of Hale Street and Judge Street (27.4643°S 153.0112°E). It was built behind the former church (built circa 1870) which faced Chapel Street. The 1895 church building is still extant but converted to a private residence; it is listed on the Brisbane Heritage Register.

Local people began to agitate for a school in February 1865, claiming at least 120 children would enrol. In February 1886, 1 acre (0.40 ha) of land was reserved for a school. Petrie Terrace State School opened in March 1868. In 1875 the school was split into Petrie Terrace Boys State School and Petrie Terrace Girls and Infants State School. In 1953 the schools were re-organised to form Petrie Terrace State School and Petrie Terrace Infants State School. Circa 1953–1954 opportunity classes were added to the Infant School for children with special needs. In 1960, another reorganisation of the schools took place, resulting in two schools Petrie Terrace State School (incorporating the infants) and the Petrie Terrace Opportunity School.

In August 1865, the Queensland Government sold 31 town lots adjoining Petrie Terrace.

In December 1865, "Lincoln Estate", being subdivisions of original portions 579, 580, 581, 597, 596 and 595 of the Parish of Enoggera, County of Stanley, in what is now known as Petrie Terrace, were advertised to be auctioned by Arthur Martin & Co.

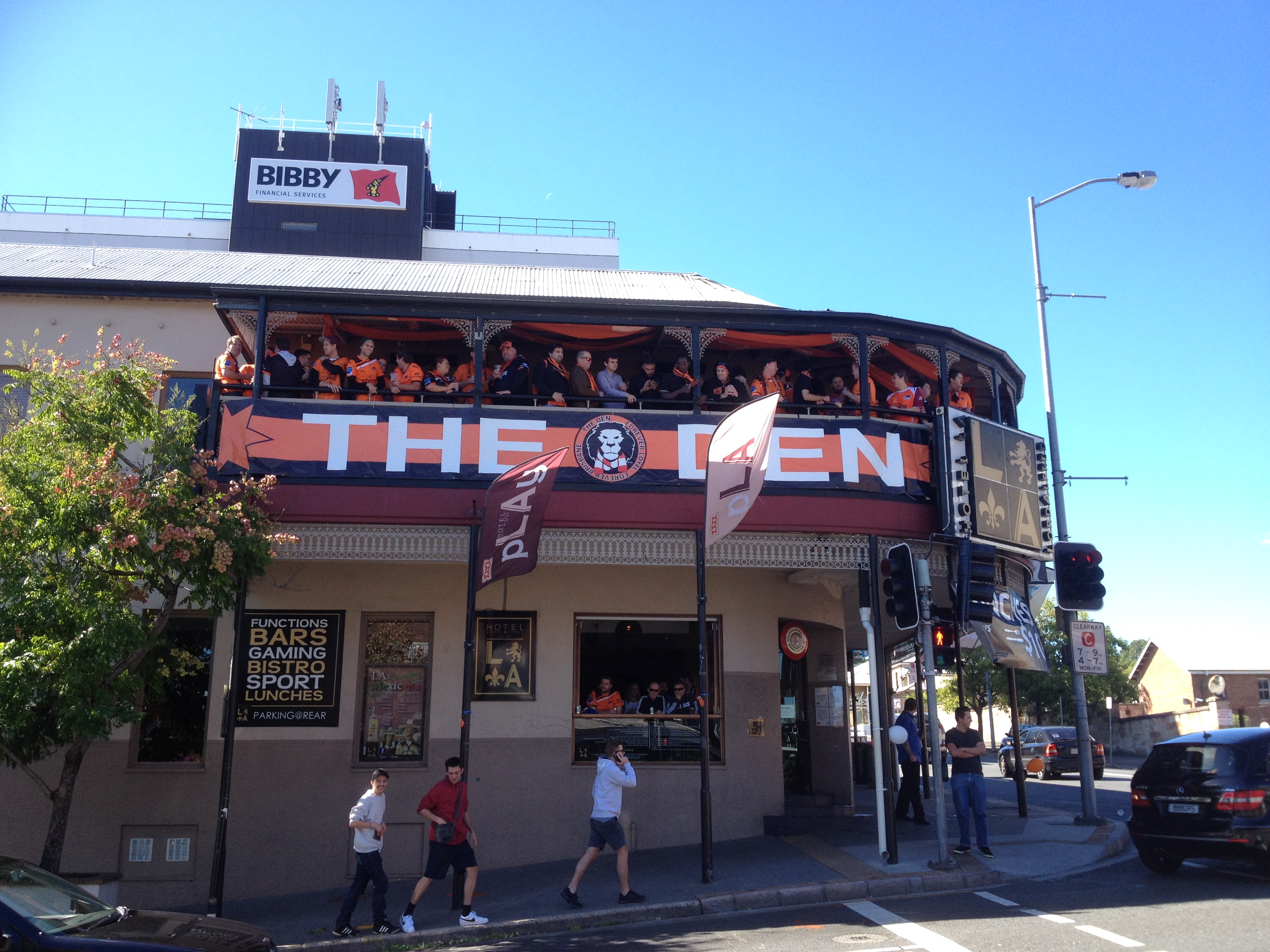
The Hotel LA

The Lord Alfred Hotel on Caxton Street opened in 1870. The hotel was conveniently positioned opposite the Old Victoria Barracks (built in Petrie Terrace between 1864–74) to attract the military personnel. It is now known as The Hotel LA.

St John the Baptist's Catholic School opened in March or April 1870. It operated out of two cottages in Caxton Street roughly opposite the present St Thomas More Church (approx 27.4634°S 153.0116°E). It was operated by the Sisters of St Joseph of the Sacred Heart. On opening, it had 52 students taught by Sister Clare Wright and Sister Francis de Sales Sullivan. The school closed in December 1879, due to Bishop James O'Quinn's expulsion of the Sisters from his diocese following disagreements with their leader Mary MacKillop.

In December 1876, portion 296, North Brisbane made up of 12 allotments were advertised to be auctioned by Mr John Cameron. A map advertising the auction shows the allotments located in Jessie Street, Petrie Terrace.

In February 1883, 50 allotments in what is now known as Petrie Terrace, and 45 allotments in what was known as Bishop's Hill, Petrie Terrace, were advertised to be auctioned by Arthur Martin & Co. A map advertising the auction shows the allotments located in Petrie Terrace, Petrie Terrace. The map inset shows close proximity to Normanby Station and the Normanby Hotel.

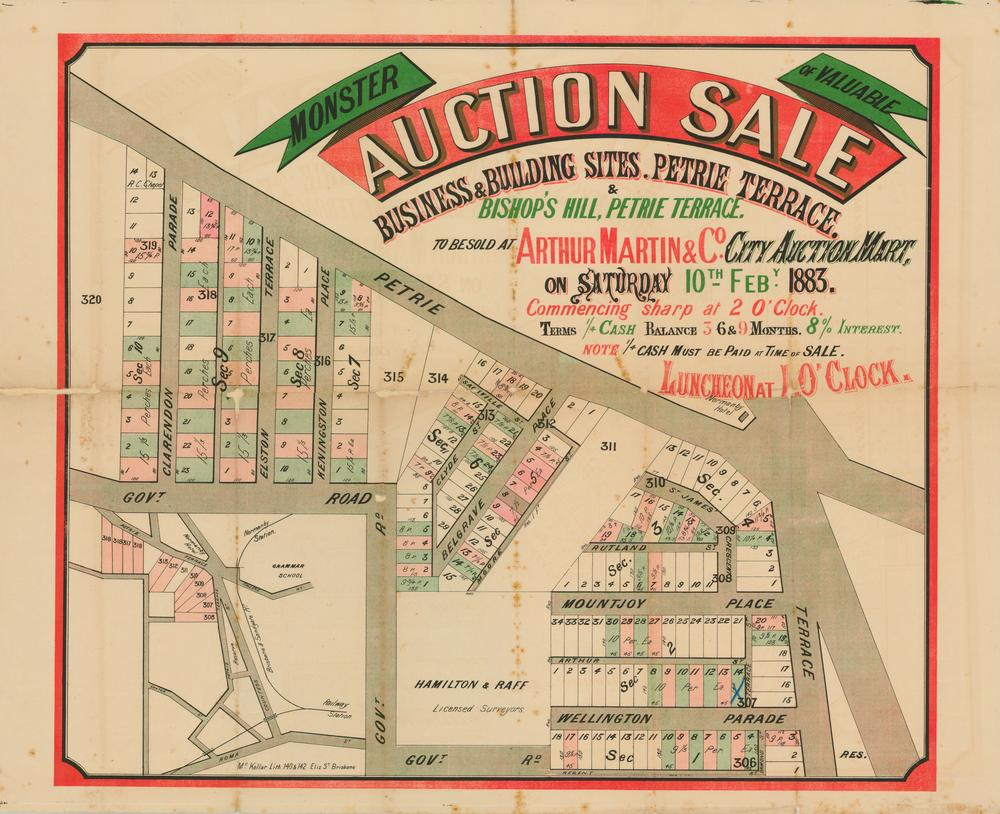
Monster auction sale business & building sites, Petrie Terrace. Bishop's Hill, Petrie Terrace, 1883

The Baroona Hall (otherwise known as the Caxton Street Hall and formerly the United Brothers lodge) was constructed between 1883 and 1884 by the United Brothers Lodge, Manchester Unity Independent Order of Oddfellows. The lodge was established in 1873, to meet the needs of a large working class population without protection against injury, illness or other hardships. Baroona Hall is also associated with Brisbane architect, Richard Gailey as an example of his work and who designed many notable commercial and residential buildings including the Oddfellows Hall in Fortitude Valley and a Masonic Hall at Toowong. In 1918, the hall was leased to Isidor Josephson, a clothing manufacturer who built a substantial business which eventually extended to most other states. The hall was utilised by the lodge and the community for a number of years and the shops were continually occupied by a number of small businesses including bakers, stationers, hairdressers, bootmakers, drapers, and the Caxton Street Legal Services from 1976. A shop at the front was for many years, famously, the location of Tony Frangos, a traditional European style tailor. The Hall at the back was also an infamous live band venue where many Brisbane rock acts, as well as interstate acts played between 1975 and 1985. The building houses the "Velvet Cigar Strip Club".

The Caxton Hotel on Caxton Street was originally built in 1884.

=== 20th century ===
In 1936, Jean Trundle and Vic Hardgraves founded the Brisbane Amateur Theatres, an amateur theatre group. It was renamed Brisbane Arts Theatre in 1947. In June 1956, the group purchased "Dan's" second-hand shop on Petrie Terrace for £6,000 and built their theatre (also called the Brisbane Arts Theatre), making them the first theatre company in Brisbane to establish its own theatre. The theatre opened on 16 September 1961 with a performance of The Multi-Coloured Umbrella by Armidale playwright Barbara Mary Vernon. The theatre was badly damaged by a fire on 31 May 1964, reopening on 15 June 1965.

On 3 June 1951, Archbishop James Duhig laid the foundation stone for the first Catholic Church in Petrie Terrace. On Sunday 6 July 1952, Duhig returned to open and dedicate the new church to St Thomas More. On 7 October 1973, Archbishop Francis Rush blessed the re-opening of the renovated and extended church building.

In 1958, the Christadelphians built a hall on Petrie Terrace; the congregation (ecclesia) had formed in the 1880s but had used rented premises previously.

In 1962, the Petrie Terrace Opportunity School was renamed the Baroona Opportunity School and in 1974, the Baroona Special School. It closed on 16 June 1995.

=== 21st century ===
In 2004, the Albert Park Flexible Learning Centre relocated into the former Baroona Special School buildings. The centre was originally opened in 1990 in Albert Park amphitheatre in the Brisbane CBD to provide schooling to homeless children. In 2000, it relocated to the Lady Bowen Building in Spring Hill, before the move to Petrie Terrace in 2004.

In 2007–2008 the former Petrie Terrace Police Depot was converted to a retail precinct called The Barracks, which contains cinemas, restaurants, shops and offices with underground car parking. The heritage buildings have been incorporated in the development. The Barracks has a walkway connection through to Roma Street railway station.

== Demographics ==
In the 2011 census, Petrie Terrace had a population of 1,183 people. 60.9% of people were born in Australia. The most common countries of birth were New Zealand 4.1%, England 3.3%, Ireland 1.7%, Scotland 1.2% and Italy 0.6%.

In the 2016 census, Petrie Terrace had a population of 1,124 people.

In the 2021 census, Petrie Terrace had a population of 1,168 people.

== Heritage listings ==
Petrie Terrace has a number of heritage-listed sites, including:

- 15–17 Caxton Street (27.4645°S 153.0131°E): Baroona Hall (also known as Baroona Labour Hall, United Brothers Lodge, Josephsons Clothing Factory, Caxton Street Hall)
- 19 Caxton Street: Berry's Shop
- 25 Caxton Street: Sneyd's Shop
- 3 Clifton Street: Udale's Shop House
- 8 Clifton Street: Grigson's Cottage
- 22 Cricket Street: Dyne's House
- 24 Cricket Street: Dyne's House
- 34 Cricket Street: Donaldson's Residence
- 1 Hale Street (27.4662°S 153.0111°E): Baroona Special School (also known as Petrie Terrace School, Petrie Terrace Opportunity School, Baroona Opportunity School, Albert Park Flexi School)
- 69 Hale Street (27.4652°S 153.0111°E): former La Boite Theatre Building
- 205 Hale Street: Ford's Cottage
- 37 Judge Street: former Baptist Church
- 35 Melford Street: former Maxwell's Residence (also known as 35 Bell Street (former))
- 30 Menzies Street: former Chase's House
- 6 Musgrave Road: Warriston (also known as Berley Flats)
- 8 Petrie Terrace: former Jackson's Granary (also known as Howes's Produce Store)
- 24 Petrie Terrace: Substation No. 4
- 25–61 Petrie Terrace (27.4654°S 153.0135°E): former Petrie Terrace Police Depot (also known as Former Police Barracks, The Barracks)
- 68 Petrie Terrace: Lord Alfred Hotel (also known as Prince Alfred Hotel)
- 83 Petrie Terrace: Victoria Barracks – Military Barracks (also known as Colonial Police Force)
- 155 Petrie Terrace: Hardgrave Park
- 172 Petrie Terrace: Shawn
- 176 Petrie Terrace: former Paslewydd
- 194 Petrie Terrace: Princess Row (also known as Costin's Cottages)
- 226 Petrie Terrace: O'Keefe's Buildings
- 244 Petrie Terrace: Illawarra Buildings (also known as Petrie Mansions)
- 256 Petrie Terrace: Florence House
- 59 Princess Street: Young's Shop/Residence
- 15 St james Street: former Warren Lodge (also known as Charleston Mews)
- 14 Wellington Street: Albert Villa
- 15 Wellington Street: Hibernia Scotia Terrace (also known as Bloomsbury House)
- 25 Wellington Street: 25 Wellington Street, Petrie Terrace
- 63 Wellington Street: Swift's Shop House

== Education ==
Albert Park Flexible Learning Centre is a Catholic secondary (11–12) school at 1 Hale Street (27.4659°S 153.0108°E). It provides secondary education through flexible formats to young men and women aged between 14 and 25 years, including those caring for young children. In 2018, it had an enrolment of 104 students with 7 teachers (5.8 full-time equivalent) and 11 non-teaching staff (5.5 full-time equivalent).

There are no mainstream schools in Petrie Terrace. The nearest government primary school is Petrie Terrace State School, which, despite its name, is within the neighbouring suburb of Paddington to the west. The nearest government secondary school is Kelvin Grove State College in neighbouring Kelvin Grove to the north.

== Amenities ==
St Thomas More Catholic Church is on the corner of Caxton Street and Chapel Street (27.4639°S 153.0116°E). A weekly service is held in Italian.

Brisbane Christadelphian Ecclesia (church) is at 134 Petrie Terrace (27.4634°S 153.0142°E).

== Attractions ==
The Brisbane Arts Theatre is at 210 Petrie Terrace (27.4616°S 153.0143°E).

== Events ==
Since 1994 the Caxton Street Seafood and Wine Festival has been held on the Labour Day weekend.

== See also ==
- Petrie, Queensland
