= Victoria Barracks, Brisbane =

Historic Australian Army base in Queensland

Coordinates: 27°27′53″S 153°00′53″E

Victoria Barracks is an Australian Army base in the Brisbane suburb of Petrie Terrace in Queensland.

== History ==
=== Colonial era ===
Early picture of Victoria Barracks in 1868, taken from Roma Street

Following Queensland's separation from New South Wales in 1859, the new government was faced with a problem: there was no permanent military presence in the new colony. The decision was made to establish a permanent presence at a site known as 'Green Hills'. Construction of the new 'Green Hills Barracks' began in 1864. The original barracks consisted of a guard room, a barracks block and officer's quarters. The first unit to occupy the new barracks was a detachment from the 12th (East Suffolk) Regiment of Foot. Although the barracks expanded in subsequent years to include a military hospital and a magazine, the garrison dwindled due largely to the effects of the Maori Wars. The next, and final British detachment came from the 50th (Queen's Own) Regiment of Foot. Following the departure of British troops, the barracks was occupied by the police from 1870 until 1885. Australia's growing colonial forces led to the barracks being re-occupied by the military. It was at this time that the name 'Victoria Barracks' was adopted, in honour of the reigning sovereign. It served as the headquarters of the Queensland Defence Force.

=== Post-Federation ===
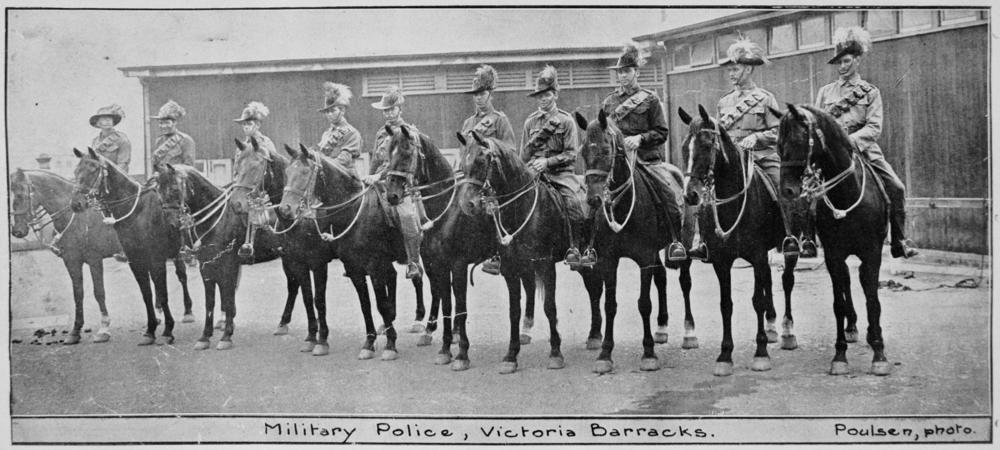
Military police at Victoria Barracks, Brisbane, 1916

Following federation in 1901, control of the site went to the newly formed Australian Army. With the build-up in forces preceding and during the First World War, the barracks experienced its second great period of expansion. It served as a headquarters during the Second World War, although its importance waned with the construction of Enoggera Barracks. From 1901 to the 1990's Victoria Barracks was the Headquarters of the 1st Military District (Australia). After the disbandment of 1MD, the Barracks was home to Defence Centre Brisbane. In 1983 a committee was formed to create a museum of Queensland Military Heritage, the museum was opened on 6 June 1984 by the Governor of Queensland James Ramsay (governor) and was operated by the Victoria Barracks Historical Society until 1998 when the Society moved out. In 1998 the newly formed Army History Unit established the Victoria Barracks Museum, this was renamed Army Museum South Queensland in 2013.

== Present day ==
Today the site is still occupied by the Army. The Army Museum South Queensland is located on the site, and contains a large collection of replica and service medals covering the Army's involvement in the Boer War, World War I and World War II.
