= Maryborough =

Maryborough may refer to:

- Maryborough, Queensland, Australia
  - Maryborough Base Hospital
- Maryborough, Victoria, Australia
  - Maryborough railway station, Victoria
- Portlaoise, Republic of Ireland, known as Maryborough from 1557 to 1929 and the eponym of the Victorian town
- City of Maryborough (disambiguation)
- Electoral district of Maryborough (disambiguation)
- Maryborough Airport (disambiguation)
- Maryborough Post Office (disambiguation)
- Maryborough railway station (disambiguation)
- HMAS Maryborough, two ships of the Royal Australian Navy
