= Toowoomba Police Station Complex =

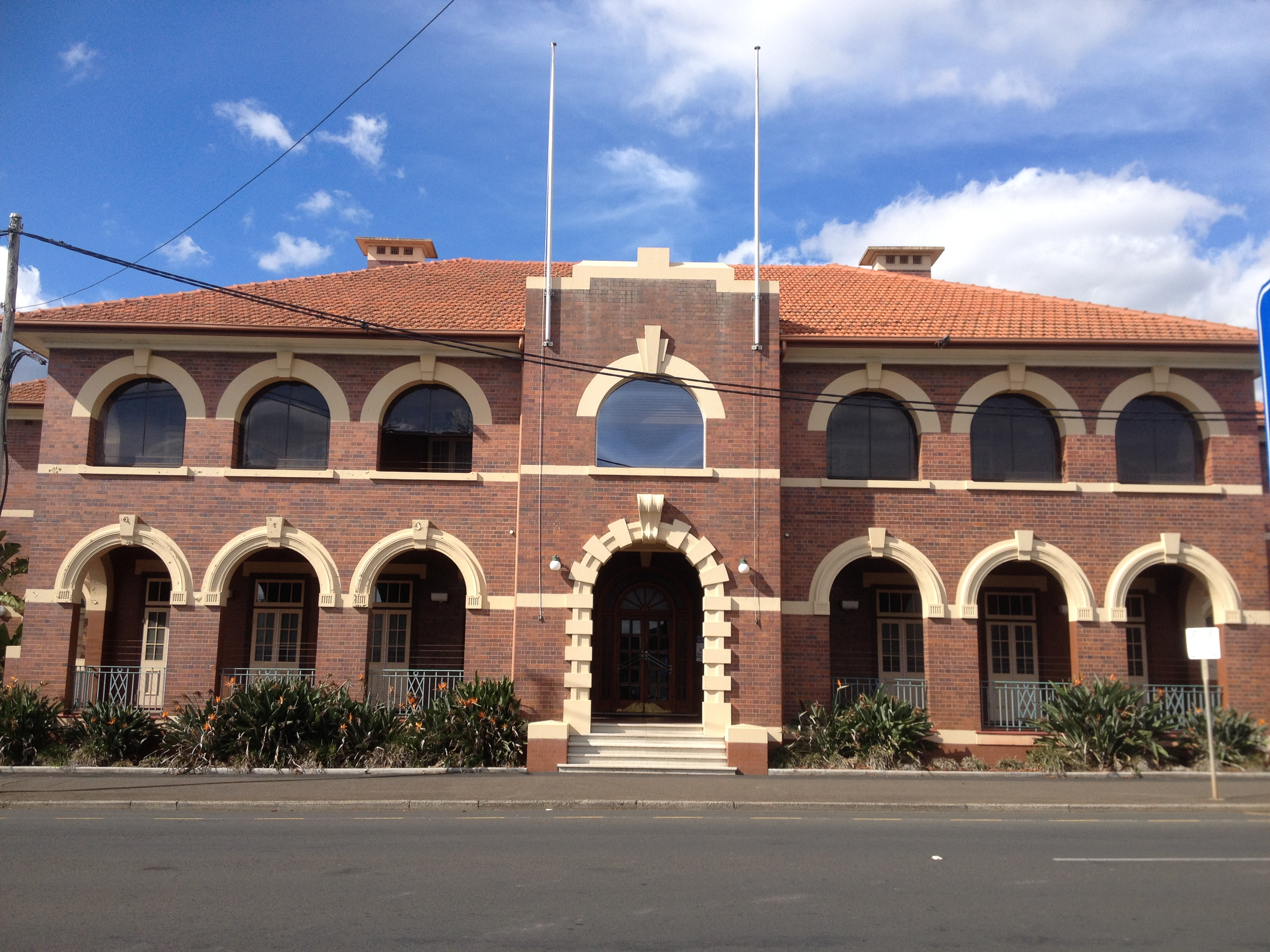
- Toowoomba Police Station Complex, 2014

- Location within Queensland Location within Australia
- 27.5623°S 151.956°E
- Location: 50–52 Neil Street, Toowoomba, Queensland, Australia

History
- Design period: 1919–1930s (interwar period)
- Built: 1935

Site notes
- Architect: Raymond Clare Nowland

Queensland Heritage Register
- Official name: Toowoomba Police Station Complex
- Type: state heritage (built)
- Designated: 5 October 1998
- Reference no.: 601710
- Significant period: 1930s (historical); 1930s (fabric)
- Significant components: watch house, cell block, garden/grounds, residential accommodation – police sergeant's house/quarters, stables, police station, garage

Toowoomba Police Station Complex is a heritage-listed police station at 50–52 Neil Street, Toowoomba, Queensland, Australia. It was designed by Raymond Clare Nowland and built in 1935. It was added to the Queensland Heritage Register on 5 October 1998.

== History ==
The Toowoomba Police Station Complex is located on a large site with frontages to both Neil and Hume Streets. It addresses Neil Street and consists of four brick buildings constructed in 1935: the police station, garage, a watch house and watch house keeper's residence.

Toowoomba is the principal town on the Darling Downs which was first discovered by explorer Allan Cunningham in 1827. It was settled by New South Wales pastoralists in search of rich grazing land and by 1844 over twenty stations had been established. The site now known as Toowoomba was eventually considered to be the most suitable location for access down the range and in 1852, a town survey was secured. The establishment of the new town was strongly supported by the squatters and Toowoomba challenged Brisbane as the new capital of Queensland. Although this status was not achieved, the town rapidly developed and by the 1860s had become the centre of pastoral development on the Downs.

A police presence in the form of a lock-up and barracks for constables and officers existed from the early formation of the town. The 1880s, a time of economic boom in Queensland, saw an increase in the number of grand public buildings constructed by the Department of Public Works. The construction of the Toowoomba Court House at the intersection of Margaret and Neil street in the 1876–78 and the Toowoomba Post Office facing Margaret Street in 1880, were followed by a substantial two-storeyed U-shaped brick police station, incorporating barracks, lock-up and lock-up keeper's quarters. It was completed in 1881 on the Neil Street site. Later, two stable buildings, paddocks, a separate lock-up keeper's quarters and inspector's residence were added to the site.

In 1915, a simple single-storeyed timber building with an iron roof was constructed at the rear of the main building as quarters for the Senior Sergeant. It originally had an open front verandah, a small front hall, three bedrooms, a sitting room, a dining room across the width of the house, and a kitchen and bathroom at the rear. This modest building is a typical Public Works Department design for a residence within a provincial location, and reflecting the hierarchal importance of the Senior Sergeant in relation to other police personnel. The building was removed during 1997.

In 1935, the buildings on the police station site were demolished with the exception of the 1915 Senior Sergeants quarters which was retained in situ, and was used as the police station during the construction of the new building. The project was part of a substantial program of public work being carried out in Toowoomba and district at that time. From January until August in 1935, £15,000 had been spent in public works wages in the area. Prominent work included the new police station, improvements at Willowburn Mental Hospital and construction of Toowoomba East State School. Building was not confined to Public sector construction activity. The private sector followed the government's lead, with new construction, extensive remodelling and modernisation of many of Toowoomba's commercial properties.

The new complex of police buildings was designed by Raymond Clare Nowland, Senior Architect of the Department of Public Works. Nowland studied at Sydney Technical College and the Architectural Association in London after which he was employed by the Commonwealth Government, 1920–26. Nowland then moved to Queensland, practicing as an Architect and Town planner in Brisbane, before commencing work in the Queensland Department of Public Works in 1933 remaining there until 1938. He designed a number of buildings for the Queensland Police including Fortitude Valley Police Station and the police barracks in Upper Roma Street. The Toowoomba Police Station Complex was designed as an integrated range of buildings and Nowland incorporated advice from the local constabulary. Suggestions and input were considered from all levels of the service, from the night watch house constable to the senior sergeant and district police inspector. A number of the original designs were amended to accommodate the very specific requirements of the local police including the garage, the watch house and the recreation area of the main police station.

The police station, a two-storeyed brick building with a single-storey rear section, incorporated offices for police duties on the ground floor and police barracks on the upper floor. The design allowed for the various police specialty divisions that had begun to evolve in larger urban centres. Offices were provided for the criminal investigation branch, the traffic branch, uniform inquiry men's room, constables' day room, as well as office space for senior staff. A public counter and room for police enquiries incorporated into the design, provided special space for the public to access the police and the many extraneous services located within police jurisdiction.

The single-storeyed watch house and watch house keeper's residence were constructed as separate buildings of coherent design to the main police station. The watch house consisted of cells, charge rooms, laundry, toilet and shower and had an internal exercise yard, creating a compact and spatially introspective building precluding the need for fencing. The watch house keeper's residence was a single-storeyed brick and tile building with a verandah. In 1988 the two buildings were joined and the watch house extended to accommodate more cell space. These alterations allowed the residence to be used as office space and the capacity of the watch house to be increased. A brick fence with barbed wire top was added for further security at this time.

A combination garage/stables with a tile roof was built on the northern boundary to replace the old stables. It contained a garage, stalls, fodder and harness rooms. Cecil Carroll became commissioner of the Queensland Police Force in 1934 and then embarked on the motorisation of the police force. A central motor garage, with trained motor mechanics was established in Brisbane in 1938, making the Toowoomba building an early example of the incorporation of the motor car into the operations of the police force. The original design for the stables incorporated 5 small stables. On the advice from Senior Sergeant J. A. D. Bookless, they were condensed to three 9-foot (2.7 m) boxes with open fronts that could be used for motor cars and with the introduction of a rail, converted to stable. The placement of the roller doors in this elevation, created space for the secure housing of stolen vehicles after hours. The garage/stable, incorporating both old and new modes of transportation, provides evidence of this transitional period of transport for the police force and the pragmatism that forced the design to incorporate both forms of transport at this time.

Since the inception of the police force in the nineteenth century, the police lived and worked within the boundary of the police reserve. The Toowoomba Police Station Complex reflected the arrangement of the living and working conditions that still prevailed in the 1930s. The location of barracks and other quarters on the same site as the police station provided an obvious law and order presence within the Toowoomba community at all times. This arrangement provided public access to the police force both day and night. The barracks and dormitories indicate the preference for single men in the position of constable

The close proximity of the court house is indicative of the close relationship in the dual arms of law enforcement, and facilitating transportation of prisoners between the two arenas. The various buildings represent the complexity of services and facilities provided by this station since its establishment last century.

A building of the Justice department, the Toowoomba Court House, is located at the rear of the police reserve facing Hume Street.

== Description ==
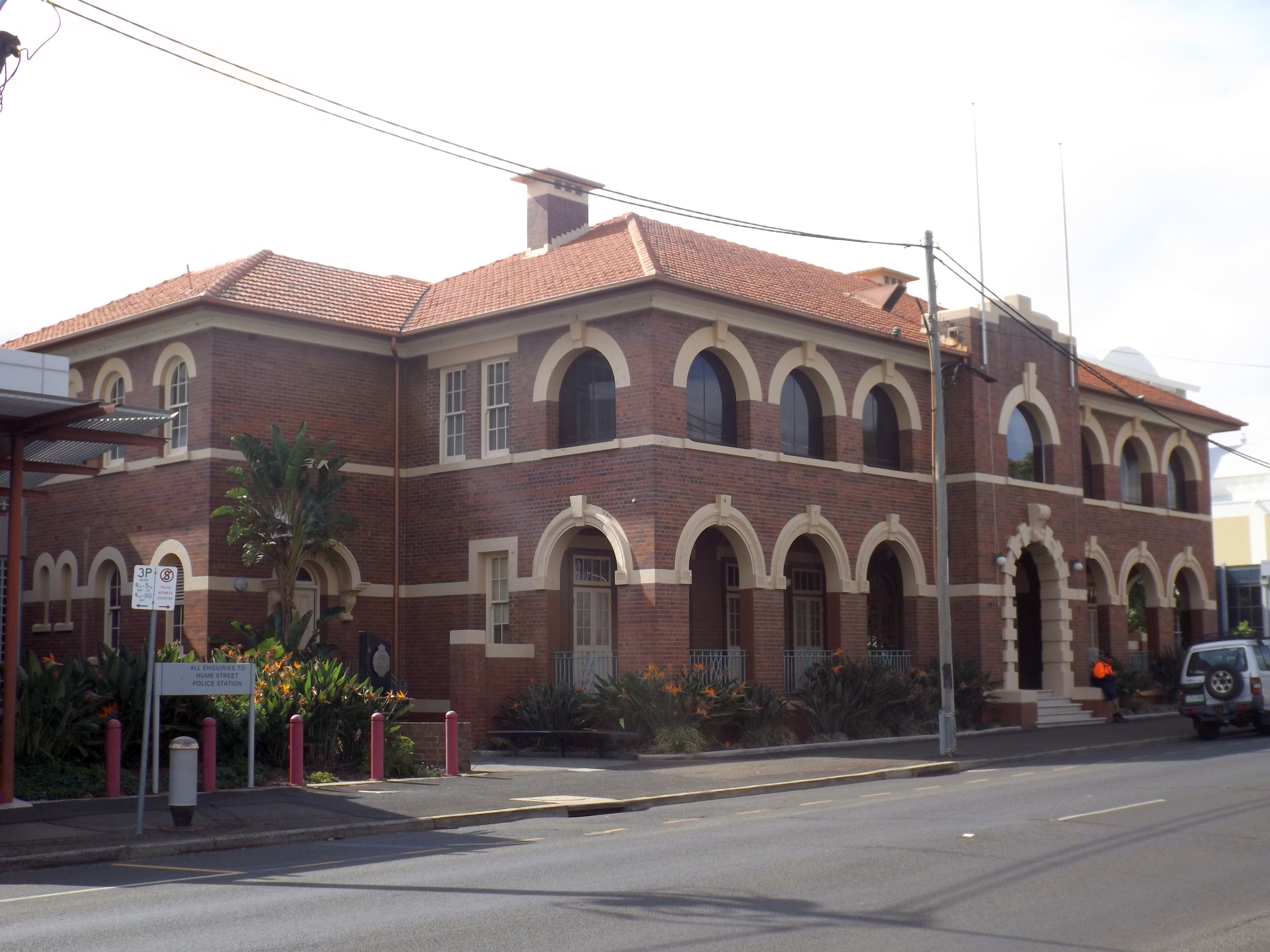
View from Neil Street, 2014

The Toowoomba Police Station is a complex on a large block situated between Neil and Hume Streets, Toowoomba. To the north of the complex is the Toowoomba Post Office and the Toowoomba Court House. The Wesley Uniting Church and, beyond this, the Empire Theatre are on sites to the south of the building.

The Toowoomba Police Station complex comprises four buildings: a substantial two-storeyed face brick police station addressing Neil Street; a one-storeyed face brick radio maintenance building on the northern boundary of the site and, to the rear of this, a watch house, comprising a former residence and purpose-built watch house. At the rear of the site, addressing Hume Street is a c. 1980 court house. Surrounding the buildings on the site are trees and remnants of early gardens.

The principal building on the site is a two-storeyed police station located centrally on the Neil Street boundary of the site. The symmetrically arranged building comprises a two-storeyed front section with a one-storeyed wing running eastward from the centre of the rear of the building. To the south of this wing in the open space between the two wings is a recent one-storeyed extension. The police station is flanked on the Neil Street elevation by face brick fences and gate posts, sections of which have been removed. The complex hipped and gabled roof of the police station is clad with terracotta coloured ceramic tiles. Projecting through the main roof of the building are four substantial face brick chimney shafts with concrete caps and overhanging shallow gabled concrete awnings. As well, a similar chimney shaft penetrates the roof of the rear wing. Generally the building is constructed from loadbearing brickwork and has rendered concrete detailing. The facades of the building are lined on both storeys with verandah loggias formed by large round arched openings. Most of these openings, although originally open have been infilled with glazing.

The principal elevation of the police station, addressing Neil Street, is symmetrically composed with a central entrance bay projecting from the face of the building and projecting above the roof line, terminating in a stepped parapet with a concrete fascia. This central bay has a large round arched opening on the ground floor, providing access to a small porch housing the entrance door. The arched opening is surrounded with rusticated concrete voussoirs and has a large corbelled keystone. This concept of an oversized keystone is repeated in a more simple concrete render on the moulded archway above on the first floor. Flanking the entrance bay are loggias on both the ground and first floor. These comprise round arched openings, heavily moulded with moulded keystones on the ground floor and more simply rendered on the floor above. The openings adjacent to the entrance bay on the ground floor have not been infilled and retain a simple painted iron balustrade comprising simple balusters and a central panel of cross braced rails. Flanking this section of the building are recessed end bays which house side entrance doors under a shallow round arched vaulted awning supported on moulded corbels. These openings which are accessed via a small concrete stair with simple iron balustrade, house single six panelled doors with round arched fanlight above. Across the face of the front facade, and the other facades of the building are concrete bands, coincident with the springing point of the arched openings on the ground floor and with the base of the arched openings on the first floor.

The side ends of the building, facing north and south, have many, variously sized round-arched openings lining both storeys of the building. Like the arched openings elsewhere on the building, these have concrete rendered surrounds. The rear of the two-storeyed section of the building continues the theme of arched openings with concrete surrounds forming loggias, now infilled, and also the concrete banding lining the building.

Extending from the rear of the building is a one-storeyed wing with gabled roof. This is constructed from brick and is lined on the northern side with a verandah. The verandah, which would originally have been repeated on the southern side of the wing prior to the construction of a one-storeyed extension on that side, is housed under the main roof of the wing. Supporting the roof along the verandah are face brick columns with concrete caps each surmounted by two squat timber posts which extend upward to the eaves line. Integrated with the timber posts is a shallow arched timber valance. A timber battened balustrade lines the verandah.

The principal entrance to the police station which is on the Neil Street elevation, is through a double multi-paned glazed door surmounted by a segmented arctic glass fanlight and all surrounded with tinted arctic glass side lights and arch surround. From the entrance access is provided to a small entrance vestibule with a public counter faced with timber panelling and housed in the northern wall. Separating this room from the hallway beyond is a shallow arched opening, recently infilled with painted timber panelling and a security door. The archway is lined with mouldings and features a large corbelled keystone. In the spandrels of the archway on the face of the eastern wall of this room are two plaster rondels. The hallway beyond the entrance hall runs from the northern end of the building to the southern end on both floors of the building. The various areas of the building are demarcated on each of the floors with concrete archways along the length of the halls. The stair hall is centrally located to the east of the entrance hall, on the other side of the central hall and separated by a moulded bulkhead resting on corbels. The concrete stair is a three quarter turn stair with iron balustrade.

Generally the interior of the police station has painted plaster walls, concrete floors lined with carpet, linoleum, and terrazzo in various sections and a ceiling of fibrous cement sheeting housed in a heavy exposed timber frame. The offices on the ground floor are accessed from the central hall way and are generally intact with corner fireplaces of glazed face brick. Lavatories and service areas are located at each end of both floors. The upper floor originally housing a number of larger room has been more altered with recent partitioning and ceilings inserted. The loggias on both floors of the building have been integrated as office space.

A now enclosed verandah and passage lines the rear of the two-storeyed section of the police station and separates it from the one-storeyed wings. The one-storeyed original central wing houses a number of small rooms and a large open room toward the eastern end. Although linked at this end to the more recent extension an internal courtyard separates this from the recent extension which houses recreational space.

To the west of the police station and on the northern boundary of the site is a simple rectangular planned face brick building, originally constructed as stables but now used as a radio maintenance building. The two ends of the building have pyramidal roofs, and a hipped roof extends between these two end bays. The roof is clad with coated metal, clip lock profile, roof sheeting. The ends of the building project from the face of the principal southern facade and the corners of these ends on this face project upward through the roof and terminate in flat parapets. Between the end bays this facade is lined with three metal roller doors with another metal roller door in a concrete extension on the eastern end of the building.

To the east of this structure is a watch house comprising an early residence adjoining a watch house. Both structures are face brick and surrounded by a high face brick fence surmounted by barbed wire security railing. The residence faces westward toward the police station and is an assymterical building with a hipped and projecting gabled roof clad with metal sheeting. The gables features three panel window openings with multi-paned casement windows under an awning supported on moulded corbels. Timber battened bargeboards infill the gables. To the rear of the former residence is a square planned face brick watch house with a number of small high level openings.

A concrete pad to the south of the watch house provides evidence of an early garage recently removed from the site. Remnants of a garden to the south of this provide evidence of another recently removed residence on the site for which this was the garden. Centrally located on the site is an early steel framed awning with pyramidal roof, protecting petrol bowsers. At the eastern end of the site is a concrete and glass Court House dating from c. 1980. This building faces Hume Street and is separated from buildings at the police station complex by a fence and a carpark.

== Heritage listing ==
Toowoomba Police Station Complex was listed on the Queensland Heritage Register on 5 October 1998 having satisfied the following criteria.

The place is important in demonstrating the evolution or pattern of Queensland's history.

The Toowoomba Police Station Complex consists of four brick buildings constructed in 1935; the police station, garage, a watch house and former watch house keeper's residence. The impressive form of the Toowoomba Police Station Complex is indicative of the importance of Toowoomba as Queensland's second city in the urban hierarchy of the state.

The place is important in demonstrating the principal characteristics of a particular class of cultural places.

The Toowoomba Police Station Complex demonstrates the multi-functional use of the police reserve to accommodate residences, official duties, remand facilities and transport requirements. It demonstrates the development of services and technologies related to the implementation of law and order in a large regional centre. The complex is an integral part of an important justice and government administration precinct which includes the former Post Office and Court House.

The place is important because of its aesthetic significance.

The Toowoomba Police Station Complex has aesthetic significance and is dominated by a large police station, designed to promote the presence of the police in Toowoomba. The other buildings, including the one-storeyed police station extension, are designed to a domestic scale and influenced by the Arts and Crafts movement. The site is a precinct of well designed and congruous brick buildings with concrete detailing. The police station is a particularly well composed institutional building, with fine detailing.

The place has a special association with the life or work of a particular person, group or organisation of importance in Queensland's history.

The Toowoomba Police Station Complex has a special association with architect, Raymond Clare Nowland of the Queensland Department of Public Works, as an excellent example of his work during the 1930s.

The Toowoomba Police Station Complex has a special association with Queensland police, demonstrating the evolution of work practices and the changing nature of the lifestyle specifically associated with police force employment in a major regional centre.
