= Maryborough Post Office =

Maryborough Post Office may refer to:

- Maryborough Post Office (Queensland)
- Maryborough Post Office (Victoria)
