= Rockhampton Post Office =

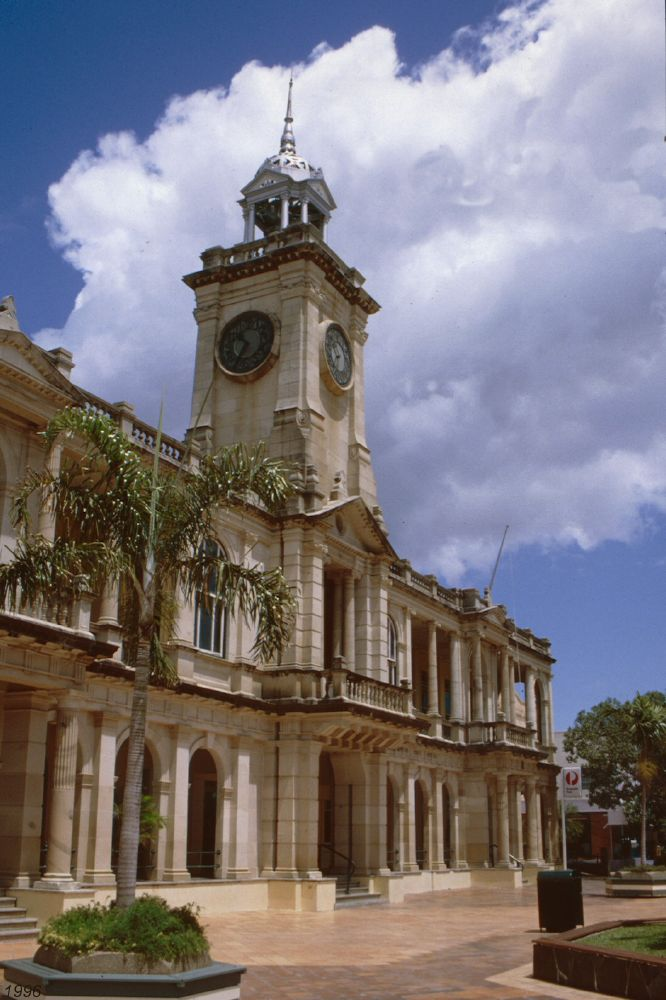
- Former Rockhampton Post Office, 1996

- Location within Queensland Location within Australia
- 23.3781°S 150.5129°E
- Location: 80 East Street, Rockhampton, Rockhampton Region, Queensland, Australia

History
- Design period: 1870s–1890s (late 19th century)
- Built: 1892–1896

Site notes
- Architect: George St Paul Connolly
- Architectural style: Classicism

Queensland Heritage Register
- Official name: Rockhampton Post Office (former), Rockhampton Post and Telegraph Offices
- Type: state heritage (built)
- Designated: 24 January 2003
- Reference no.: 600792
- Significant period: 1890s (fabric); 1860s–1990s (historical, social)
- Significant components: residential accommodation – post master's house/quarters, tower – clock, strong room, post & telegraph office, residential accommodation – telegraph master's house/quarters, counter, clock
- Builders: Dennis Kelleher

Rockhampton Post Office is a heritage-listed former post office at 80 East Street, Rockhampton, Rockhampton Region, Queensland, Australia. It was designed by George St Paul Connolly and built from 1892 to 1896 by Dennis Kelleher. It is also known as Rockhampton Post and Telegraph Offices. It was added to the Queensland Heritage Register on 24 January 2003.

== History ==
This grand two-storeyed brick post office with sandstone facing was erected in 1892 for the Queensland Post and Telegraph Department. It was designed in the office of Queensland Colonial Architect George Connolly, and was built by Dennis Kellaher for £14 368. Situated at the corner of Denham and East Streets, it was the sixth post office to be established in Rockhampton after a succession of temporary and superseded post offices.

An unofficial post office was established at Rockhampton in 1858 at a store in Little Quay Street and in 1861 was relocated to a chemist shop. In December 1862, Postmaster General Thomas Lodge Murray-Prior recommended the establishment of an official post office in Rockhampton. By 1863 the first official Postmaster had been appointed and a temporary wooden post office building was constructed on the present post office site between 1863 and 1865.

During this period Rockhampton's postal services had expanded greatly. In 1865 Rockhampton was linked with Brisbane, via the inland route, through Taroom, Hawkwood, Dalby, Toowoomba and Ipswich and by the mid-1860s most outposts in Central Queensland were in touch with Rockhampton through fortnightly or weekly mail services. On 20 November 1864 a telegraph line was opened between Rockhampton and Gladstone and the first telegraph office was opened in a chemist shop.

The makeshift wooden post office was replaced in 1866 by an ornate two-storeyed brick building with decorative wooden verandahs. This building was designed by Colonial Architect Charles Tiffin but was originally planned for the Maryborough Post Office. Due to the cost of materials exceeding the budget for the post office originally planned for Rockhampton, the plans for the post offices were swapped. The two buildings were designed concurrently by Tiffin.

In 1876, the Rockhampton Post Office had processed more than a quarter of a million ordinary letters and fifteen thousand registered letters as well as providing money order and savings bank services.

From 1879, postal and telegraph services were amalgamated under the Queensland Post and Telegraph Department, but the two services continued to operate separately in Rockhampton, with both a Post and Telegraph Master. In 1883 a new telegraph office was erected next to the old post office. At this time Rockhampton was the main telegraph traffic centre for central and north Queensland and was the largest telegraph office outside Brisbane.

In 1881 telephones were introduced to Rockhampton with the first telephone exchange opening in April 1884 in a low, wooden building behind the telegraph office and next to the old post office facing East Street. By 1886 the old post office of twenty years and the 1883 telegraph office were too small and the Colonial Architect was requested to plan a new building. With the construction of the 1892 Post and Telegraph Office the three buildings which housed Rockhampton's communication network were demolished and a temporary post office was established in the old Court House while construction was taking place.

The present post office was constructed of brick with a facade of sandstone from the nearby Stanwell Quarries. It was constructed by Dennis Kellaher when his tender for £14,368 was accepted as the lowest. Kellaher was also contracted to install the first floor accommodation for the Post and Telegraph Masters for £3579.

The original design of the Post and Telegraph Office was reflective of the separate services of the two departments. The Postal section was located on the corner of Denham and East streets and the Telegraph section was located at the northern end of the building facing East Street. The two were separated by a carriage-way and a clock tower which was installed in September 1894 by the Government Clockmaker. (The clock was made by Gillet and Johnston of Croydon, England, and cost £325.) The first floor was dedicated entirely to accommodation for the Post and Telegraph Masters, each of their apartments situated above their respective sections on the ground floor.

The front wing of the Post Office section was originally divided into rooms for the savings bank and money order office, delivery room and the private letter box office by partitions of cedar with embossed panels. The delivery room of the new Post Office introduced an innovation in customer service by installing a counter in order to hand correspondence to the public instead of the usual method of serving through a small window.

In the three decades leading to the establishment of the 1892 post office, Rockhampton had proved itself a thriving commercial centre due to its position as an official port of entry servicing a vast area of central Queensland. The immense financial boost from the Mount Morgan gold rush in the 1880s further established Rockhampton as a wealthy commercial centre. The grand structure of the Rockhampton Post Office symbolised the prominence of the city during this period and the confidence which was held for its future. Many buildings of similar architectural and aesthetic calibre which were constructed in Rockhampton during this period (e.g. Quay Street) were a manifestation of the city's economic wealth. With Federation looming, the establishment of the Rockhampton Post Office was held as a great boon to the advancement of the Central Queensland separationist movement which had long supported a political rivalry with the capital of Brisbane.

Rockhampton was the communication nexus for the developing areas of central and north Queensland and the continuing use of the Rockhampton Post Office for postal services over the last century clearly demonstrates the development of communication technology in one of the most important postal centres of Queensland. While the grand, stone exterior of the post office has remained largely intact, the interior of the building has been altered a number of times to accommodate the changing needs of the postal and telegraph services.

During construction of the post office, parcel post was introduced to Queensland, and one of the first alterations occurred in 1896 to provide more suitable accommodation for the processing of packages. A separate space for parcels was created at the rear of the building with a new public counter accessible through the Denham Street arcade. Another extension was added at this time at the rear of the post office section adjacent to the carriage-way.

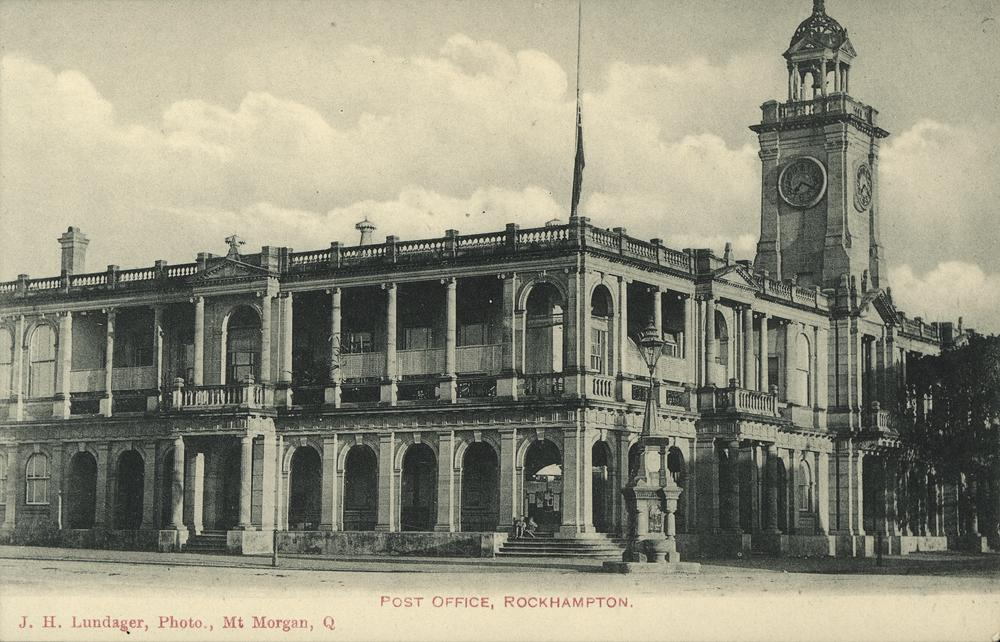
Rockhampton Post Office, circa 1895

Following Federation in 1901, the colonial post and telegraph services were handed over to the Commonwealth Government and the Rockhampton Post Office became the Property of the Post Master General's Department. By 1913, the Telegraph Masters accommodation had been replaced with staff facilities and a telephone switch room which was subsequently expanded in 1921 to cope with the rapidly increasing demand for telephones.

In 1940, the present automatic telephone exchange building was opened enabling the telegraph operating room in the Post and Telegraph Office to be moved upstairs while the dispatch office and public counter remained on the ground floor. By 1945 the Post Master's accommodation on the first floor had been removed for use as offices and the first floor carriage-way had been infilled.

In 1945, the first floor telegraph rooms were updated with new telegraph and phonogram accommodation. Rockhampton was one of the seven original telegraph traffic centres to be equipped in 1947 with an Auxiliary radio channel for use during periods of land line failure.

In 1963 the ground-floor carriage way was infilled and a central staircase inserted. A new main entrance was positioned at the former entrance to the carriage-way, under the clock-tower, and an extension was constructed at the rear of the building joining completely the two separate sections of the building.

In 1975, the Australian Post Master General's Office became two separate commissions, Australia Post and Telecom, with telegraphic communications no longer a constituent of the post office. The interior of the post office was refurbished in 1980 with the exterior maintaining its grand colonnaded facade. In the 1988 the French doors and sash windows which originally opened onto the arcade at the southern end of the building were removed to create arched openings to access a concertina arrangement of private mailboxes. The Rockhampton Post Office ceased functioning as the main post office in Rockhampton in May 1997.

In 2015, the building has a number of commercial tenants including a restaurant and cafe.

== Description ==
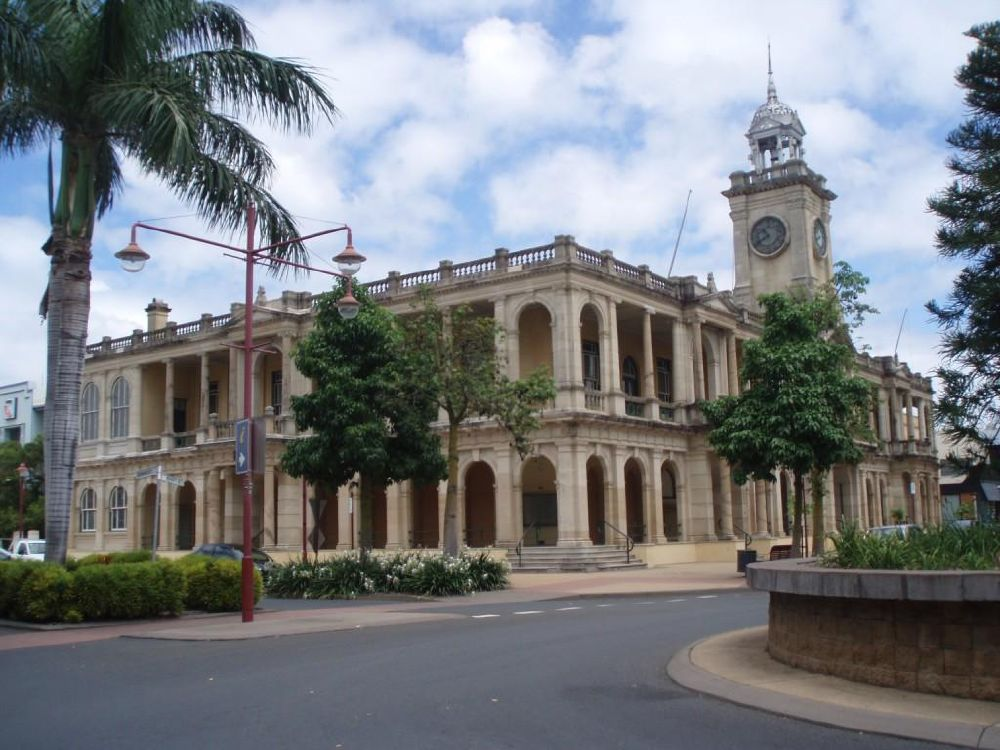
Former Post Office, 2009

The Rockhampton Post Office, a two-storeyed rendered masonry structure with an arcaded sandstone facade and corrugated iron hipped roof, is located on the western corner of East and Denham Streets, fronting the East Street mall to the northeast.

The post office was originally constructed as separate postal and telegraph buildings linked together by means of a clock tower and an arcaded sandstone facade to both street frontages. The two buildings were separated by a laneway, above which the clock tower was located. This laneway has since been enclosed and now forms the central entry to the building.

The arcaded sandstone facade is punctuated by projecting balconies which are supported by columns at each corner flanking entrance steps. The balconies are located below the clock tower and centrally along both street frontages. The ground floor arcade comprises arches, with expressed keystones, separated by pilasters and surmounted by a deep entablature with triglyphs. The ground floor arcade has a raised base with a terrazzo floor with non-slip applied finishes. Steps are located below the projecting balconies and at the corner of East and Denham Streets, and the ceiling is finished with fibrous cement sheeting.

The first floor arcade comprises columns supporting an entablature with dentils, surmounted by a sandstone parapet balustrade to the roof. The arcade has arched sections with expressed keystones located behind the projecting balconies, flanking the clock tower, and at the end corners of both street elevations. The arched sections flanking the clock tower, and at the southern corner of the Denham Street elevation, are enclosed with large arched sash windows. The arcade has cast iron balustrade panels, with a sandstone hand rail, and the projecting balconies have a sandstone balustrade with corner pillars. The balconies are also framed by columns supporting a pediment crowned by a sandstone ornament. The arcade has a boarded ceiling, and a stair is located at the southern corner of the Denham Street elevation.

The base of the clock tower has a central entrance at the ground level surmounted by sandstone corbelling supporting a projecting balcony above. The entrance is flanked by pilasters, and the balcony is framed by paired columns, flanked by pilasters, supporting a broken pediment with central circular opening crowned by a sandstone ornament. The clock tower has a square plan with corner pilasters supporting a deep entablature with dentils surmounted by a sandstone parapet balustrade to the roof. The tower has a circular clock face with sandstone surrounding moulding to each side. The northeastern clock face has the words ANNO 1890 DOMINI (literally translated as 'in the year of our Lord 1890') in relief above, and TEMPVS FVGIT CITO PEDE (literally translated as 'Time flies on winged feet') in relief below. The tower is crowned by a cast iron cupola, which consists of a central dome, surmounted by a spire, with pediments supported by columns to four sides.

The northern end of the building has rendered coursing to the corners, rendered parapet details, and expressed coursing at the first floor sill height. The first floor has tall sash windows and the ground floor has arched sash windows, all with window hoods comprising metal brackets with timber battens and corrugated iron awnings. A tall masonry wall abuts this elevation, adjoining the adjacent building to the northwest, forming a vehicular entrance to the rear service court. A rear wing consists of the remains of an original rear annex with several additions. The wing has sash windows with window hoods to the early section, with louvred ventilation panels to the rear plant area.

The rear of the building has a large single-storeyed addition which infills the original U-shaped rear courtyard. This addition has a shallow pitch roof, masonry walls and metal framed glazing. The first floor has a verandah which is enclosed with mostly glass louvred panels and has an ogee shaped corrugated iron roof.

Internally, the building has rendered masonry walls, and contains suspended lighting and air-conditioning ductwork. The ground floor central entry, located in the infilled original laneway, has sliding glass doors accessing a central foyer with a metal framed and timber stair. The northern end contains the public counter, and has central timber posts with shaped capitals and boarded timber ceilings. Large sash windows and French doors with arched fanlights open onto the arcade. The southeast end contains mail sorting facilities, with partitioned office areas including the original strongroom, adjacent to the central entry. This area has boarded timber ceilings, and large openings which access the rear addition. The French doors and sash windows, which originally opened onto the arcade at the southern end of the building, have been removed to create arched openings which access a concertina arrangement of private mail boxes. The rear addition has open mail sorting space with three partitioned offices against the inside rear wall. This area has exposed metal roof trusses and vinyl floor tiles.

The first floor has large sash windows, French doors with arched fanlights (located opposite the projecting balconies), and timber panelled doors with fanlights opening onto the arcade. The southeast end has boarded timber ceilings, open office space with two partitioned rooms, and central timber posts with shaped capitals. The southwest end also has central timber posts with shaped capitals and boarded timber ceilings, and contains a lunch and amenities area with a central partitioned structure containing kitchen facilities, store and locker room. The southwest end contains toilet facilities, remnants of an original kitchen fireplace, and a metal framed and timber stair is located adjacent at the southwest end of the arcade.

The central section of the first floor has a fibrous cement panelled ceiling with a partitioned office which fronts the arcade with a large sash window in a rendered masonry wall. This section of the arcade originally overlooked the laneway, and retains the original sandstone balustrade and paired columns which are now positioned in front of the infill wall. This section of the arcade also originally contained two stairs, either side of the laneway, and evidence of this area survives including sections of rendered masonry walls with door openings. A metal ladder also accesses the clock tower above. The central metal framed and timber stair is located behind the partitioned office and accesses the roof space above.

The northern end has timber and fibrous cement partitions which divided the space into various sized offices. The ceilings have fibrous cement sheeting, and the northwestern rear wing contains service rooms. The rear verandah has a concrete stair with metal handrail at the northwestern end, and timber lattice screen with gate at the southern end.

== Heritage listing ==
The former Rockhampton Post Office was listed on the Queensland Heritage Register on 24 January 2003 having satisfied the following criteria.

The place is important in demonstrating the evolution or pattern of Queensland's history.

The Rockhampton Post Office, erected in 1892, is important because it reflects the rise of Rockhampton as the major commercial centre of central Queensland during the late nineteenth century. In the 1880s, Rockhampton benefited economically from the mining of gold at Mount Morgan. The immense wealth generated from the gold mines created a period of buoyancy in Rockhampton which produced many prestigious buildings of which the Rockhampton Post Office is an outstanding example. The Post Office building was a symbol of confidence for the future of Rockhampton and was held as a great boon for the separation movement which saw Rockhampton as the future capital of a separate state.

The place is important in demonstrating the principal characteristics of a particular class of cultural places.

The Rockhampton Post Office is a prime example of a grand Queensland Post Office with a sandstone facade. The building is important in demonstrating the planning of a nineteenth century Post Office, and of the four stone-faced post offices in Queensland (i.e. Brisbane General Post Office, Warwick Post Office, Toowoomba Post Office and Rockhampton's) the Rockhampton Post Office is the most outstanding example of this type of structure.

The place is important because of its aesthetic significance.

The Rockhampton Post Office is significant architecturally as an example of Victorian Classical architecture of the late nineteenth century. The building is of considerable aesthetic significance, and its form and fabric exhibit a skilled design approach. The post office, through its scale, detailing and prominent clock tower, is recognised as a local landmark and makes an important contribution to the Rockhampton streetscape and townscape. The building is an important component of the civic centre of Rockhampton, and the detailing of its materials and finishes demonstrate a fine quality of workmanship.

The place has a strong or special association with a particular community or cultural group for social, cultural or spiritual reasons.

The Rockhampton Post Office holds a special association for the people of Rockhampton. Its landmark position and its role as a meeting place for the local community has established the post office building as a symbol of Rockhampton.

The place has a special association with the life or work of a particular person, group or organisation of importance in Queensland's history.

The Rockhampton Post Office has a special association with the post and telegraph services in Queensland which spans over 100 years. It illustrates the changing functions of a major post office from the late nineteenth century to the present. The building is also an important example of the work of the office of Colonial Architect George Connolly from 1885 to 1891.
