= Maryborough Post Office (Victoria) =

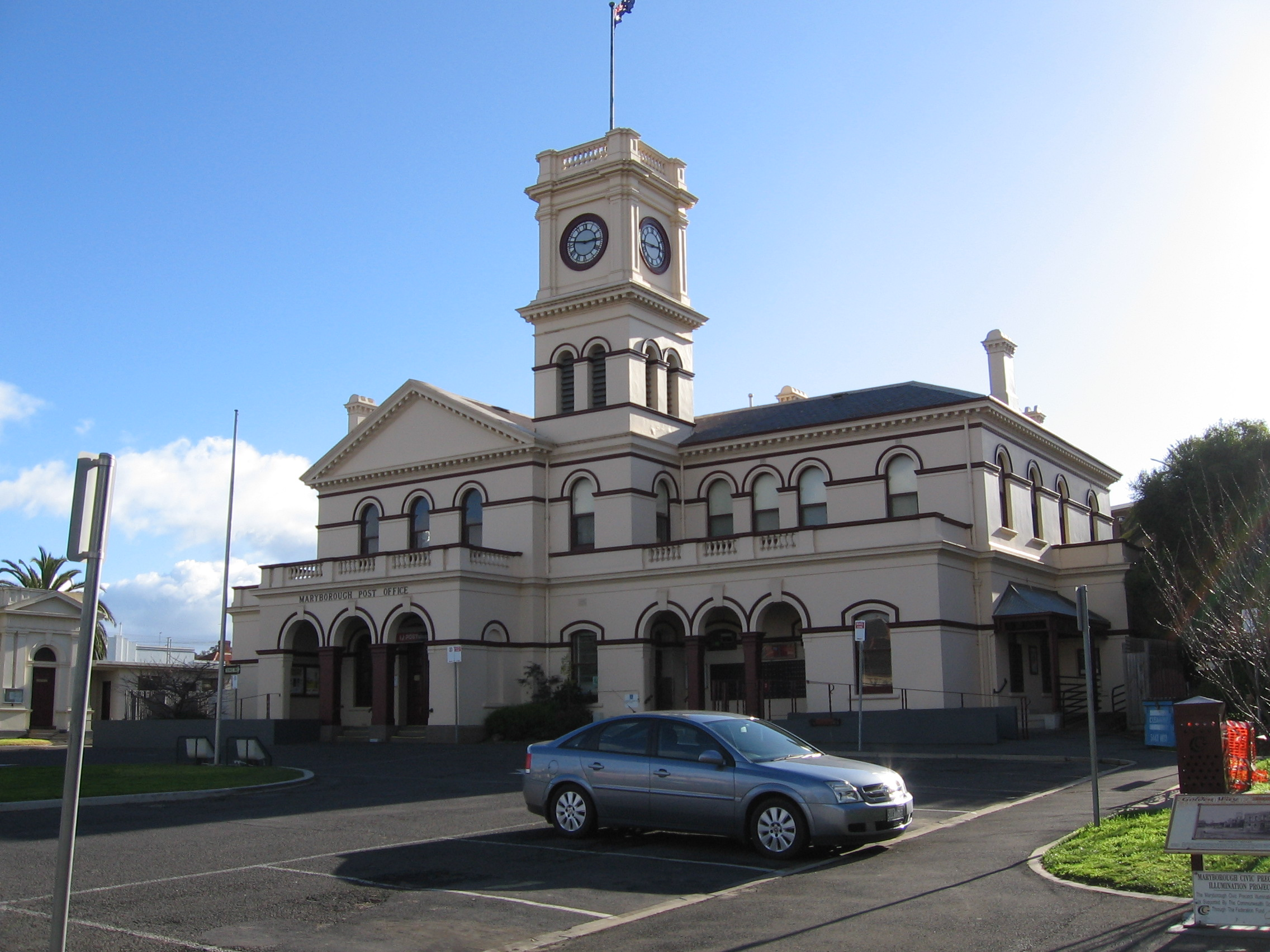

- Location within Victoria
- 37.0463°S 143.7367°E
- Location: 69 Clarendon Street, Maryborough, Victoria, Australia

History
- Built: 1876–77

Site notes
- Architect: John Hudson Marsden

Commonwealth Heritage List
- Official name: Maryborough Post Office
- Type: Listed place (Historic)
- Designated: 8 November 2011
- Reference no.: 105515

Maryborough Post Office is a heritage-listed post office at 69 Clarendon Street, Maryborough, Victoria, Australia. It was designed by John Hudson Marsden and built in 1876–77, with the clock tower added in 1879. It was originally built as a combined court house, post and telegraph office and Colonial office, though the post office alone has occupied the building since 1892. It was added to the Australian Commonwealth Heritage List on 8 November 2011.

== History ==
Maryborough Post Office was constructed on the site of the second government camp associated with the Maryborough gold fields, and replaced an earlier stone post office building constructed in 1858. Plans for the new building were prepared by architect John Hudson Marsden of the Department of Public Works, with construction occurring between 1877–78. The clock tower was not originally part of the design, but had presumably been added by 1879 when tenders were called for the supply of the clock. The clock's bell was cast in Castlemaine by William J. Horwood. The building was originally designed to house the court house and post office, and was built by Peter Cunningham at a cost of £9,126, far surpassing any other building in the town. The postal authorities took over the large court room in 1894, for use as the postal chamber, following the construction of a new court house adjoining the post office. The post office building forms part of Maryborough's civic precinct, comprising the post office (1877), court house and town hall (1893) and war memorial, forming three sides of the town square.

McLandress Square was developed in front of the building c. 1880s, with Maryborough Town Hall built on an adjoining site in 1888. Maryborough Court House was built on another adjoining site in 1892–93, at which time the court house was removed from the post office building. The former court room chamber was converted to a new postal hall in 1893–94.

Signage was added to the facade above the main entrance at some stage between 1917 and 1940. A war memorial was constructed in McLandress Square and general improvements to the private garden area undertaken in 1926. Some rear areas of the office building were refurbished with strapped plaster ceilings c. 1920s.

Further works took place c. 1940s–1960s. A freestanding brick amenities building and bike shed was constructed behind post office and the rear yard terraced and concrete-paved. A small single-storey rear addition at the southwest corner of the building was possibly constructed at this time, as was a small porch and a single toilet block on the southern side of the building. The construction of the toilet block necessitated the bricking in of a single window in the projecting wing behind it and the creation of a door opening providing access from the offices. Bollards were installed in the driveway in front of the main entrance. Private letter boxes were installed in lieu of the former post office loggia windows. External fixtures and fittings included oil tanks for heating, fluorescent light fittings and possibly two freestanding structures to the south of the building for public telephones and private bicycles [since demolished]. Internal alterations to the post office included widening of openings between the large rear rooms to the southwest of the former court room and the general refurbishment of these spaces. It would appear that the dividing walls between the offices along the southern side of the court room were demolished and new stud-framed walls were constructed to re-partition the offices. A glazed timber screen was installed between these offices and the back rooms and a door opening was created between the offices and the new toilet block to the south. General internal refurbishment included fluorescent light fittings, vinyl floor coverings, replacement of door hardware and furniture, overpainting of joinery, and fireplaces were generally either infilled or fitted with oil heaters and textured brick surrounds.

Alterations to the quarters in the 1960s included the infill of the rear verandah, installation of a toilet in the laundry wing, refurbishment of the kitchen and bathroom, installation of oil heaters and brick surrounds to living room and front bedroom (first floor sitting room), overpainting of joinery, wallpapering of some rooms and possibly replacement of some original ceilings with sheet plaster ceilings and stepped plaster cornices, large detached automated telephone exchange building was constructed on the site to the rear of the post office at an unknown date. The date of the electrification of the clock is also unknown.

A freestanding brick garage was constructed between quarters and telephone exchange c. 1970s. Additional private letter boxes were installed in mail room window openings, north elevation, at some stage prior to 1998.

The 1990s saw construction of disabled access ramps to the main entrance and private letter box loggias, which also included construction of a new verandah over the private letter boxes in the north elevation. A canopy was built between the 1960s toilet block and rear sorting room. Signage was installed within the entrance porch. A general interior refurbishment for Australia Post included new cabinetry joinery and fittings throughout the main postal hall and installation of a coved perspex canopy over the panelled timber entrance screen, as well as a new kitchenette in the lunch room.

A timber-framed lean-to at the rear of the original post office and residence was built for storage of crates at some stage post-2002. Repairs to first floor ceilings in linen cupboard and passage of residence were undertaken c. 2006–07.

== Description ==
Maryborough Post Office is at 69 Clarendon Street, Maryborough, comprising the whole of Lot 2 LP222543.

Maryborough Post Office was built in 1876–77 as a combined court house and post office. The post office is in the Italianate palazzo style and features two three arch colonnades and a clock tower.

The large site is located at the centre of an unusually concentrated administrative precinct linked by a shared town square, McLandress Square, with flanking town hall and court house buildings, both imposing Victorian-era designs. The precinct is sited one street west of Maryborough's principal commercial and retail area, on axis with Nolan Street. Prior to the establishment in 1924 of a war memorial at the centre of the square, the post office site originally extended to Clarendon Street and contained a circular cast iron fountain and circular drive. While the fountain was replaced with a granite and bronze memorial surrounded by lawn, the driveway form remains in an approximate state, albeit with asphalt surface and formalised parking bays along both sides. To the north of the residence, and divided from the carpark by a corrugated steel fence, are the remains of the post master's private garden. The garden is further subdivided in line with the rear corner of the building to form a rear service garden which contains a 1970s brick garage, rotary clothes line and early brick, weatherboard and lattice outbuilding; the original use of this building is uncertain. The rear yard of the post office has been concrete-paved and is accessed from Wellington Street via a concrete driveway along the northern side of the 1960s telephone exchange. It contains a 1940s–60s brick amenities block and recent covered area between the amenities block and the post office delivery area.

Maryborough Post Office is an imposing asymmetrical Italianate composition with astylar palazzo detailing and arcades. The two storey complex comprises a multiple-pavilion building of rendered brick construction on bluestone base with distinct sections relating to the residence, post office and former court and sub-treasury functions. The principal elevation is marked by a four-stage clock tower with flagpole, balustraded top, dentilled cornices and slate-louvered paired openings.

Architecturally, the principal elevation is divided in two by the central clock tower. A double-height gabled section to the south relates to the original court chamber and is fronted by a projecting triple-arcaded porch with balustraded top marking the original court room entrance, now the principal post office entrance. To the south of this is a single-storey single-fronted wing with parapeted hipped roof extending back the full depth of the former court room; this section now contains the postal manager's office and associated offices, but is believed to have originally contained the sub-treasury or Colonial offices. This wing returns across the rear of the court chamber and now provides ancillary offices, delivery area and lunch room. To the north of the clock tower is a two-storey wing containing the original post and telegraph office at ground floor level and quarters above. The wing is screened by a single-storey triple-arcaded porch with balustraded top to the front elevation and non-original verandah and access ramp to the north. The quarters entrance is set back from the façade and is via a parapeted projecting side porch and cast iron verandah at the mid-point of the north side elevation. At this point the quarters occupy both ground and first floor levels.

The elevations are encircled by ribbons of superimposed moulded string courses which rise to archivolts where broken by semi-circular arched window heads. The eaves overhang and gable front are further marked by moulded brackets which read as a dentilled cornice. The pattern of fenestration is generally applied in a regular mode between floor levels with triple groupings of window openings at first floor level reflecting the triple-arched arcades below.

=== Condition and integrity ===
Externally, Maryborough Post Office's ability to demonstrate its original design is exceptionally good with regard to the architectural conception, principle materials and detail despite a small number of alterations and additions. These changes have been largely confined to the rear of the building with the exception of disabled access ramping, installation of private letter boxes and the construction of a small verandah area to the north elevation. Accretions such as later fencing, paving, signage and lighting are generally superficial and reversible and have not diminished the overall integrity or level of significance of the place. Where repairs or conservation works have been carried out, they have generally replaced like with like, maintaining the architectural integrity of the original. The building exterior appears to have been generally well maintained, however, there is a substantial section of fallen first floor cornice moulding at the rear of the quarters.

Internally, cumulative works throughout the post office and court sections of the complex and alterations to the original program and internal planning have diminished the broader legibility of the former operations of the place and integrity of original finishes. Such works include the installation of floor linings, replacement ceilings, mechanical ducting, joinery, false partitions, lighting and over painting of timber components. Having said this, such alterations are considered to be cosmetic and essentially conceal the original fabric and presentation of the key plan. For instance, the main postal hall retains its double height volume and clerestory highlights, but has been diminished in aesthetic terms by the installation of standardised slat wall joinery and counters.

Notwithstanding the above, externally and internally the building appears to be in relatively sound condition, well maintained and with minimal defects visible. Apart from minor cracks and the fallen rear section of cornice, the render sections and embellishments of the façade are sound. Internally, a number of the original ceilings have been replaced with plasterboard. Very few, if any of the original fittings and furniture remain although original timber-framed windows and panel doors were evident, as were the strong room and panelled timber ventilation ducts.

== Heritage listing ==
Maryborough Post Office, constructed in 1877–78, is the key element in the formalised local civic precinct, being the first and central element within the group of three public buildings which define the square. The scale and quality of the post office with its inherent landmark qualities and its flanking counterparts reflect the importance of Maryborough as one of the Colony's most important settlements built on the means of gold mining in the nineteenth century. Maryborough Post Office combines an uncommon multiplicity of functions and is one of a small group of post and telegraph offices providing not only for post and telegraph, sub-treasury and residential functions, but for court function as well. The original intent of the design is clearly legible in plan form and is particularly pronounced to the exterior. Further, the post office is a key element in the grouping of civic buildings around a central square, believed to be rare in Victoria.

Typologically, Maryborough Post Office is an example of a large post and telegraph office with quarters combined with a similar measure of integrated government offices and court house. While the separate components are conceived as distinct units, they are unified by the complex composition, arcaded facade, applied pattern of fenestration and restrained decoration. Stylistically, Maryborough Post Office is an impressive Italianate palazzo design which fuses numerous mid-Victorian modes and an asymmetrical composition with restrained detail. The weight and quality of the design is enhanced by its imposing siting and neighbouring civic buildings. Architecturally, Maryborough Post Office is an example of the Public Works Department architect, JH Marsden under the aegis of William Wardell. The form is an archetypal response, one of the last under Wardell's reign, to a substantial post office of the 1870s. Maryborough Post Office is an excellent example of a large-scale public building in the Italianate palazzo style.

It is a recognised landmark and one of the most prominent elements in Maryborough's historic townscape, and in the more intimate and immediate town square context. The complex also effectively terminates the significant Nolan Street vista and views from Maryborough's other iconic structure, the Maryborough railway station. While the composition of the post office complex is seemingly devoid of lavish decoration, it gains its aesthetic weight from a finely composed asymmetrical design and exceptionally well-handled meshing of integrated, yet distinct, functions. The complex as a whole, together with the adjoining public buildings sited around McLandress Square, also maintains a high level of integrity and legibility with regard to its urban planning attributes. Maryborough Post Office has been a key and prominent component of the historic townscape for 130 years and is a widely known and valued symbol which is identified with the town's origin and nineteenth century prosperity. Maryborough Post Office is additionally significant for its association with the work of the enduring Public Works Department architect, JH Marsden (1872 – post-1900) and also the certain supervision of Inspector General, William Wardell. Wardell's influence and guiding architectural philosophy may be seen in the building's simplicity and austere detailing.

The curtilage includes the title block/allotment of the property.

The significant components of Maryborough Post Office include the main postal complex of 1877-78 and clock tower. The brick and weatherboard outbuilding to the rear is of contributory significance.
