= Maryborough Post Office (Queensland) =

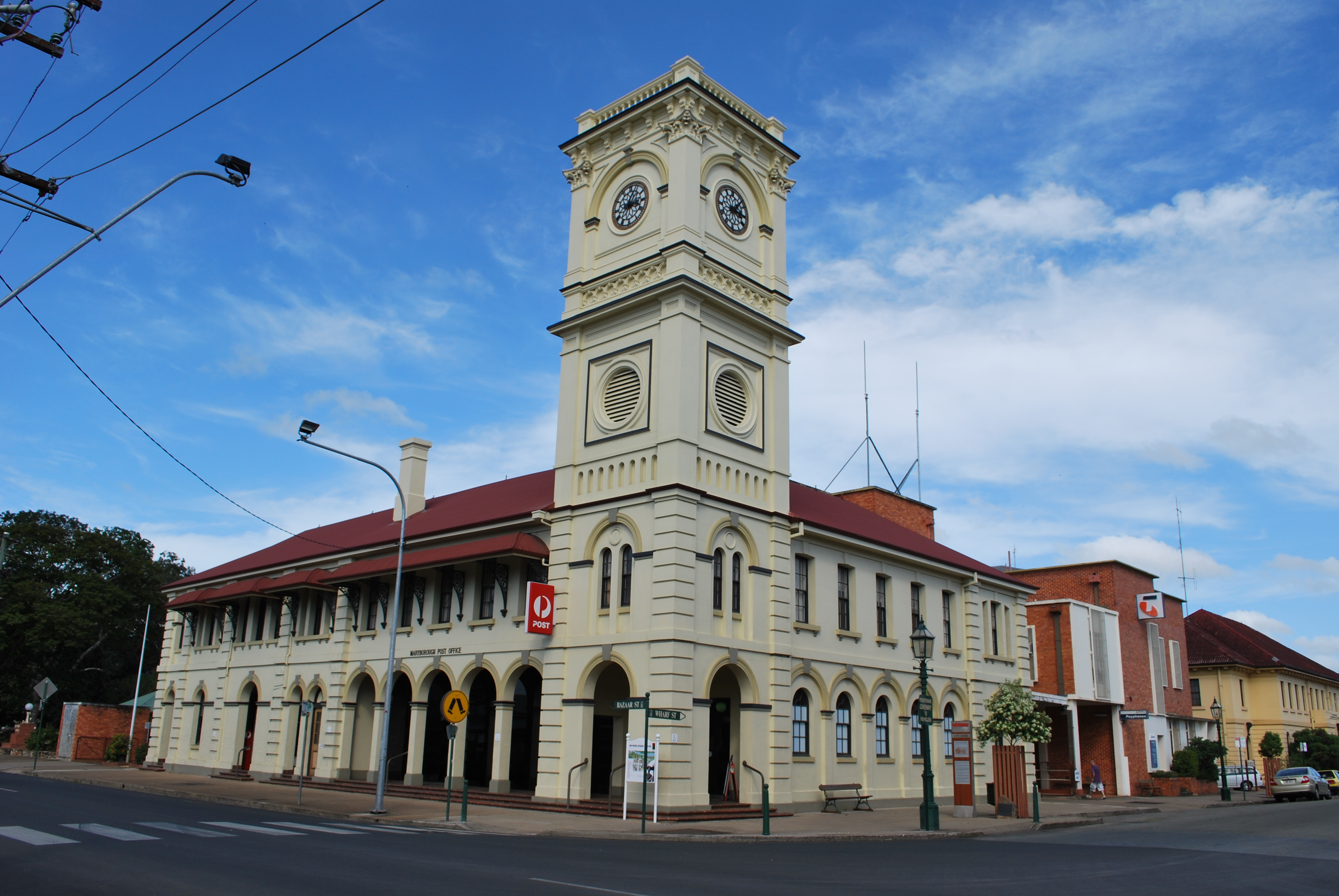
- Maryborough Post Office, 2008

- Location within Queensland
- 25.5375°S 152.7045°E
- Location: 227 Bazaar Street, Maryborough, Fraser Coast Region, Queensland, Australia

History
- Built: 1865–1866

Site notes
- Architect: Charles Tiffin

Commonwealth Heritage List
- Official name: Maryborough Post Office
- Type: Listed place (Historic)
- Designated: 8 November 2011
- Reference no.: 106140

Maryborough Post Office is a heritage-listed post office at 227 Bazaar Street, Maryborough, Fraser Coast Region, Queensland, Australia. It was designed by Charles Tiffin and built in 1865–1866. It was added to the Australian Commonwealth Heritage List on 8 November 2011.

== History ==
Situated on the Mary River, Maryborough was first settled in the late 1840s and is one of Queensland's oldest cities. Many settlers to the region also entered the Colony of Queensland through the Port of Maryborough in the nineteenth century. Wool was an early local export, with the original Maryborough site, occupied until 1855, located between the Bruce Highway and the Mary River.

Maryborough was a thriving township when it was proclaimed a municipality in 1861. In 1865 the Maryborough Sugar Company was set up and, when gold was discovered in 1867 at Gympie, Maryborough became one of the major access points to the fields.

The Maryborough Post Office was constructed in this thriving period (1865–66) to designs prepared by Colonial Architect, Charles Tiffin. The post office is the oldest post office known to survive in Queensland, and is one of three remaining masonry post offices from the period between Queensland's separation from New South Wales in 1859 and the amalgamation of the post and telegraph departments in 1878. The Maryborough Post Office and the Rockhampton Post Office were designed concurrently and, due to the high cost of building materials in Rockhampton, the tender for construction of Rockhampton Post Office was exceeded. This problem was allegedly solved by the exchange of the less expensive Maryborough design with Rockhampton's. The elevations for Maryborough Post Office refer to Denham and East Streets (in Rockhampton), rather than Bazaar and Wharf Streets. The building constructed in Maryborough (Rockhampton's design) was designed for an eastern orientation rather than a western orientation, and hence it lacked the appropriate sun shading.

In 1869 a single faced clock, facing Wharf Street, was installed in the third level of the tower. The Wharf Street loggia was enclosed in 1875–77 by contractors J and J Rooney to increase accommodation and improve lighting and ventilation. A further storey was added to the corner tower in 1879–80, allowing the installation of a four dialled clock and bells, which was officially started on 9 December 1879 (the clock was dismantled in 1935). The first country telephone exchange was opened in Maryborough in November 1882, and a new wing constructed to house the expanding operation in 1885, as well as the enclosure of the Bazaar Street loggia. As a result of the enclosure of both loggias, the ground floor offices were not protected from the summer heat. This necessitated the construction of a corrugated iron awning supported by cast iron columns over the Bazaar Street footpath and the attachment of cast iron framed corrugated iron sunshades to the first floor level windows on both facades. In addition, a timber-framed balcony replaced the sunshades to the first floor level of the postmaster's quarters in 1896. Internal alterations were undertaken in 1906 and 1925, and a separate building for the telephone exchange was added in 1948. The building underwent further additions and alterations, including the reopening of the Bazaar Street loggia, during the 1950s and 1960s.

The design and alterations were undertaken by the Colonial Architect's office under Charles Tiffin (1865–66); then FDG Stanley (1875–79, tower extension), JJ Clark (1882–85) and Alfred Barton Brady (1896–1906). The 1925 alterations may have been by the Australian Government under John Smith Murdoch's leadership.

The alterations included: 1869 (clock); 1878 (loggia enclosure); 1879–80 (tower alterations); 1885 (alterations to Bazaar Street); 1886 (awning and sunshades); 1896 (balcony); 1906 (internal alterations); 1925 (internal alterations); 1948 (telephone exchange building); 1950s (extensions); 1979 (refurbishments).

== Description ==
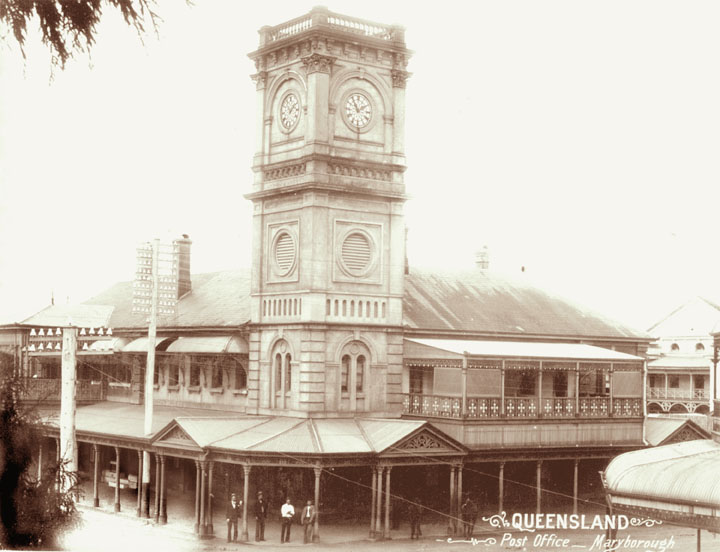
Maryborough Post Office, circa 1897

Maryborough Post Office is at 227 Bazaar Street, corner Wharf Street, Maryborough, comprising the whole of Lot 9 RP147687.

Maryborough Post Office is at the corner of Bazaar and Wharf Streets, near the Mary River docks area and next door to the Law Courts, a Federation-era building, with Queens Park to its immediate north. The 1866–9 exterior was designed by Charles Tiffin, including the broad form of an astylar palazzo with each loggia in antis between flanking pavilions with layered arched windows on the ground floor. The loggia arches are supported on square columns with moulded springing points, suggesting a Tuscan order but not making any order explicit. The archivolts are moulded with strongly stated keystones supporting a flat-fronted course line. The ground-floor arches on the pavilions are double-layered with similar archivolt treatment to the arches in the loggias and recessed and surrounded by a second wall layer in cement-rendered brick.

The upper level in Tiffin's design was composed of two recessed stories above each loggia framed by the first floors of each pavilion. The Bazaar Street side's north pavilion and the east pavilion on Wharf Street were marked on their first floors by a three-light window with two large masonry mullions with segmental brick arches. The corner pavilion has two arched windows in its first storey, with a recessed wall layer inside the arch framing two narrow arched windows with a roundel between their arches. Above that was a single storey extension to form a clock tower. This was separated from the first floor pavilion below by a dressed panel with a set of slots, and a coffered wall with a clock face inside the coffer facing Wharf Street, and a circular vent facing Bazaar Street. This level had a coffered frieze, boxed eave without bracketing, and a simple low-pitched pyramidal roof. Above this roof was a flagpole with a ball roof finial at its base. The chimneys were in plain masonry with a cornice, string course necking and broadened base.

The windows were small-paned frames, in double-hung sashes on the first floor quarters elevations, broadened at the tower base into fully open arches; all upper windows on the Bazaar Street side now have heavily scaled concave canopies.

The 1878–9 alterations included a loggia enclosure, to add more rooms and gain better natural lighting. The tower was extended; the rear was also extended by about a third, and the north flanking bay was absorbed into the recessed elevation next to a new projecting wing. The Bazaar Street side was terminated by a new bay reproducing the old flanking pavilion in elevation, and a terminating bay of large door width flanked by two corners with rusticated quoins. The original hipped roof was replaced by a gable-hip. This arrangement needed more sun protection, so in 1886, during JJ Clark's term as Government Architect, the pavilions, tower and bays were then all linked by a deep sheltering verandah, carried on turned columns, rounded at the corner, with two low gables fronting its fascia directly in front of the corner tower bays.

The tower's previous top level, housing the clock, was retained as a vented level with the circular vents of the original tower being carried all the way round, and with a new clock level including clock faces to all four sides, framed by an arch moulding carried on two squat pilasters flanked by a Corinthian column at each corner. The tower was then topped by an Italianate balustrade with waisted balusters. The original pyramidal roof and ball-based flagpole were not reinstated to the extended tower.

In 1896, ten years after the ground floor verandah was added, a first floor balcony was added to the Wharf Street frontage sitting directly over the verandah roof. The Bazaar Street upper floor gained a coved roof hood as protection against western sun as well as a sunshade verandah form fronting the first floor drawing room. Subsequently, the loggia arches were closed over on the Wharf Street side, being replaced by double-hung sash windows and partly hidden by the awning. The open loggia form was retained on the Bazaar Street side, at least for the time being. On the Wharf Street side the former loggia spaces were reassigned to an extension of the post office hall and several new offices. There was still no internal toilet at this stage, and nor does one appear to have been planned.

In 1906 the telephone exchange was moved to a new outer wing added at the rear, and there were corresponding resitings of the telegraph and telegraph manager's quarters. An extra bedroom was added at this point. From this work, too, came the opening of the double-layered arch at the clock tower base, to allow better access to the post office boxes inside. The concrete footings and the reinforced concrete floor may date from either this period or from the 1940s additions (see below).

In 1925, probably under JS Murdoch's increasingly direct aegis, there was a resiting of internal function areas. Some time after this a timber-framed balcony was added to the north-east side at the rear. This was later walled in and converted to additional office space in the 1950s. The Maryborough Town Council looked after the bells but removed them in 1935 when the nearby Maryborough Town Hall gained its bells, though the lining, stair and some fittings remain inside the tower from its extension in 1879–80. The meeting room, current parcels room and cleaner's room retain some fittings and details left over from 1866.

In the 1940s a divisional manager's office was added as part of a new wing at the rear. This was accompanied by a meeting room and recreation area replacing the original postmaster's and telegraph manager's quarters. In 1948 a new telephone exchange building was added to the site, during Frank Gibson Costello's term as Government Architect, and a three-truck garage was built. These additions appear to have supplanted the earlier outbuildings on the site, some of which had been built with Tiffin's original design. The ground floor verandah and first floor balconies were all removed at this time and replaced with cantilevered entrance awnings. These have themselves been taken away since then, so that by default the exterior is relatively close to its original form and its original intentions architecturally. A timber-framed mail room was added and several new doorways were opened up in 1956–7, and the mail room was extended in 1965. Concurrent with these works the internal spaces were upgraded with new timber and glass-panelled partitions, a refurbished public space and the floor and ceiling claddings were also substantially renewed.

The original building was 2 storeys high with a 3-storey clock town. The clock tower extended to 5 storeys in 1879.

The original fabric of the building includes:

- Structural frame: Load-bearing solid brick on rendered plinth and footings, timber-framed floor and roof (1866–1885). Reinforced concrete slab to ground floor.
- External walls: rendered and over-painted brick with cement rendered dressings and rusticated quoins to principal street elevations and clock tower with painted brick to rear elevations.
- Internal walls: Generally hard plastered brickwork, later plasterboard partitioning.
- Floor: Ground: reinforced concrete slab; first: timber framed and hardwood boarded.
- Ceiling: Suspended grid-form acoustic tile, painted beaded timber boards, plasterboard and to first floor, areas of non-original strapped plaster sheet.
- Roof: Timber framed, hipped form recently re-clad with rust red Colorbond; ogee profile cast iron rainwater goods; rendered brick chimneys with moulded caps. Skillion-roofed rear first floor verandah roof finished with rust red colorbond.
- Other: timber-framed double-hung sash windows, "french doors", cast iron columns to ground floor public spaces.

=== Condition ===
Internally, wall, ceiling, floor and joinery fabric, including cast iron columns, original to the building and its subsequent nineteenth century stages of development remain throughout, albeit later modified, including the internal planning. Modifications include partitions and false ceilings. Alterations undertaken in 1906, 1925, 1950s and 1960s have impacted on the original albeit-evolved nineteenth century internal and external building components. Timber and brick surfaces throughout have also been overpainted.

== Heritage listing ==
The significant components of Maryborough Post Office include the main postal complex of 1877–78 and clock tower, together with the weatherboard outbuilding to the rear.

Maryborough Post Office was listed on the Australian Commonwealth Heritage List on 8 November 2011 having satisfied the following criteria.

Criterion A: Processes

The Maryborough Post Office, originally constructed in 1865–66 to the design of Colonial Architect, Charles Tiffin, and subsequently extended, is the oldest post office known to survive in Queensland, and is one of three remaining masonry post offices from the period between Queensland's separation from New South Wales in 1859 and the amalgamation of the post and telegraph departments in 1878. Its scale and imposing presence, including the prominent clock tower, is demonstrative of the growing regional importance of Maryborough in the nineteenth century. Its many additions and changes also reflect the need to physically update and adapt the building to Maryborough's prosperity and development.

Criterion B: Rarity

The Maryborough Post Office is the oldest post office known to survive in Queensland, and one of three remaining masonry post offices from the period between Queensland's separation from New South Wales in 1859 and the amalgamation of the post and telegraph departments in 1878.

Criterion D: Characteristic values

Maryborough Post Office is an example of:

- a post office and quarters (first generation typology 1803–1869), with tower
- a building in the Renaissance Revival / astylar Italianate style\
- the work of the Colonial Architect's office under Charles Tiffin (1865–66); FDG Stanley (1875–79, tower extension); JJ Clark (1882–85); and Alfred Brady (1896–1906). The 1925 alterations may have been under JS Murdoch's Federal jurisdiction.

Typologically, the original building comprised a post office and residence with tower, but relatively quickly accommodated the addition of a single faced clock in 1869 to the third level of the tower. Later nineteenth century works which impacted on the original form and planning include the enclosure of the loggias, a further storey added to the corner tower, a new wing constructed to house the expanding telephone exchange operation, a timber-framed balcony to the first floor level of the postmaster's quarters; and a variety of other internal and external alterations and additions in the twentieth century. These later works have impacted and diminished the typological attributes of the building

Stylistically and architecturally, however, the building retains its Renaissance Revival and Italianate styling, as per Charles Tiffin's original design, including the symmetrical composition of a prominent corner clock tower flanked by arcaded loggias in antis between flanking pavilions and layered arched windows.

Criterion E: Aesthetic characteristics

Maryborough Post Office is a key historic building within the centre of Maryborough, one of the most significant buildings in the town, and complemented by the Post Office Hotel opposite. Its Renaissance Revival and Italianate styling, including the symmetrical composition of a prominent corner clock tower flanked by arcaded loggias and pavilions; the rusticated banding, moulded cornices and architraves; and the pattern of fenestration and original timber window and door joinery, all contribute to the building's presence within the streetscape.

Criterion G: Social value

Maryborough Post Office has social significance as a valued public heritage building in an important historic town, with a continuously operating history as a post office.
