= City of Maryborough =

City of Maryborough was the name of two former local governments in Australia:

- City of Maryborough (Queensland)
- City of Maryborough (Victoria)
