= Electoral district of Maryborough =

Electoral district of Maryborough may refer to:

- Maryborough (Parliament of Ireland constituency)
- Electoral district of Maryborough and Talbot
- Electoral district of Maryborough and Daylesford
- Electoral district of Maryborough (Victoria)
- Electoral district of Maryborough (Queensland)
