= Toowoomba Court House =

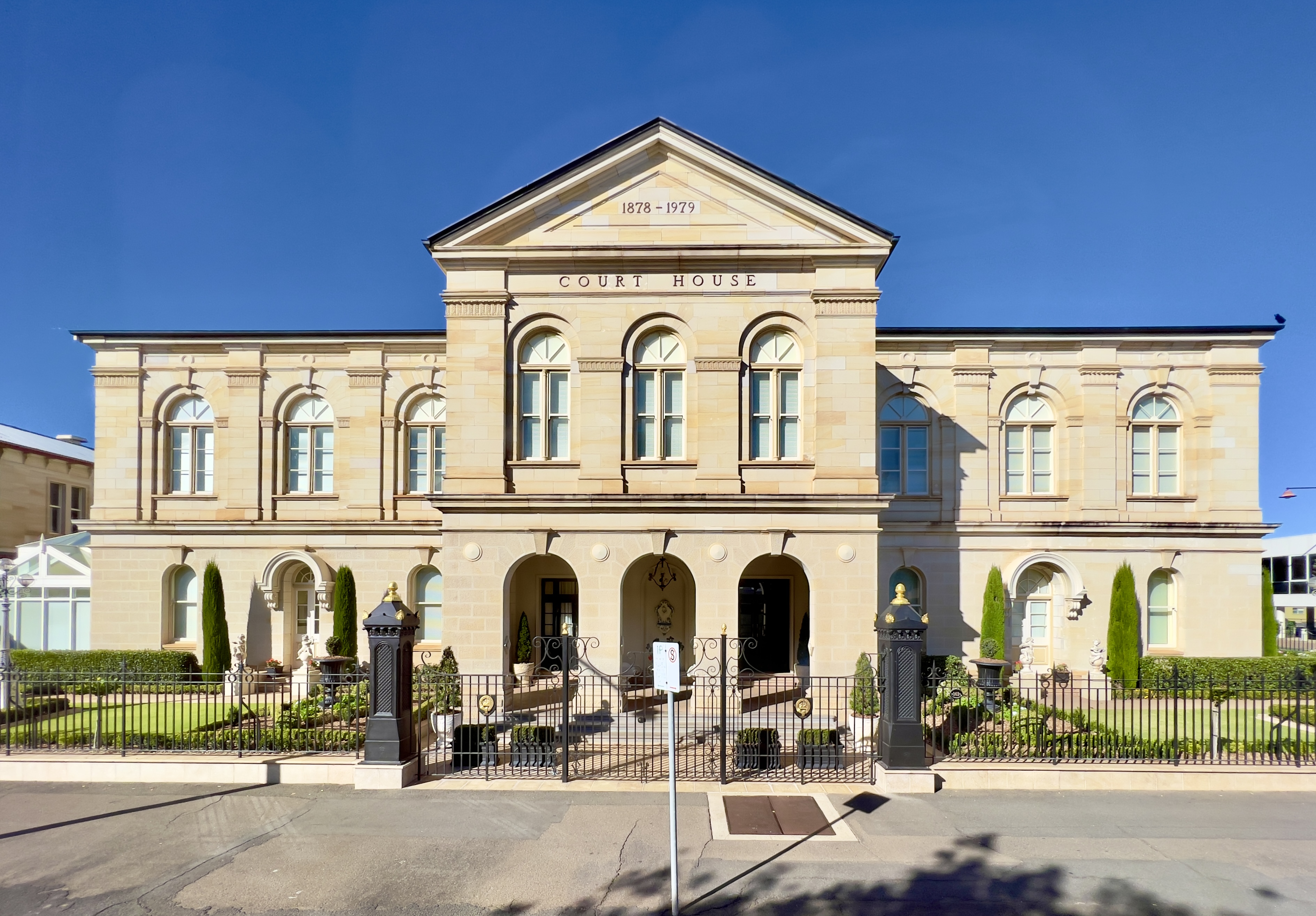
- Toowoomba Court House, 2023

- Location within Queensland Location within Australia
- 27.5618°S 151.9558°E
- Location: 46 Neil Street, Toowoomba, Queensland, Australia

History
- Design period: 1870s–1890s (late 19th century)
- Built: 1876–1943

Site notes
- Architect: Francis Drummond Greville Stanley
- Architectural style: Classicism

Queensland Heritage Register
- Official name: Toowoomba Court House
- Type: state heritage (built)
- Designated: 21 October 1992
- Reference no.: 600848
- Significant period: 1870s–1880s (historical); 1870s, 1910s, 1940s (fabric)
- Significant components: roof lantern / lantern light, court house, stables, office/s

Toowoomba Court House is a heritage-listed former courthouse at 46 Neil Street, Toowoomba, Queensland, Australia. It was designed by Francis Drummond Greville Stanley and built from 1876 to 1943. It was added to the Queensland Heritage Register on 21 October 1992.

== History ==
The main section of the Toowoomba Court House was erected between 1876 and 1878. At the time of its construction, the Queensland Colonial Architect responsible for the design of public buildings was F D G Stanley.

Toowoomba is the principal town on the Darling Downs which was first discovered by explorer Allan Cunningham in 1827. It was later settled by pastoralists in search of rich grazing land and by the 1840s, led by the Leslie brothers and John Campbell over twenty stations had been established. The first township which evolved to support these stations was Drayton, west of Toowoomba. Within ten years, the town had been established as a "government town", with much support from the local squatters. As with other government buildings, the first court house on the Downs was constructed at Drayton.

However the success of Drayton did not last. The site now known as Toowoomba was eventually considered to be in a more suitable location for access down the range and in 1852, a town survey was secured.

The establishment of a new town was strongly supported by the squatters and Toowoomba challenged Brisbane as the new capital of Queensland. Although this status was not achieved, the town rapidly developed and by the 1860s had become the centre of pastoral development on the Downs.

Construction of the new Toowoomba law courts and public offices began in 1876. They replaced an earlier, smaller building, also located in Margaret Street, which was constructed in 1863. The new building was much larger than the previous one and of a more imposing design, indicative of the sense of prosperity and permanence felt by the town.

The building was erected in stages, the first of which was completed by 1878. The contractor for this section was J Gargett and the building was erected at a cost of £6870. It was constructed of locally quarried cut stone from Highfields.

In 1913, a single storey building was erected at the rear of the site, for use as the Lands Office. It fronted Neil Street and adjoined the existing building. Although of a different stone, it was of a similar style to the original building, costing £1963-10 to erect.

Further additions were made to the site in 1943, including the addition of another storey to the 1913 building and two more two storeyed buildings behind the 1877 building. Of these, one was located at the eastern end of the existing building and attached to it, forming a U-shaped structure. The second building was freestanding and located in the centre of the "U" shape. The additions were constructed at a cost of £28799 and were designed by government architect R C Nowland.

In May 1979, the court relocated to a new $2.2 million building in Hume Street. The former court house underwent a restoration, removing the white paint and protecting it instead with a clear silicone. A number of Queensland Government departments then occupied the building, including the Queensland Police, the Department of Sport and Tourism and the Department of Family Services. The interior layout then had little resemblance to either the 1878 or 1943 layouts. In 1986, the building was added to the Register of the National Estate. By the 1990s, the building was described as "exceedingly run down".

The courthouse was sold in 2000 to Robert and Lorraine Grant for use as a private residence and, with advice from the Queensland Heritage Council, undertook significant work consistent with the building's historic structure.

== Description ==
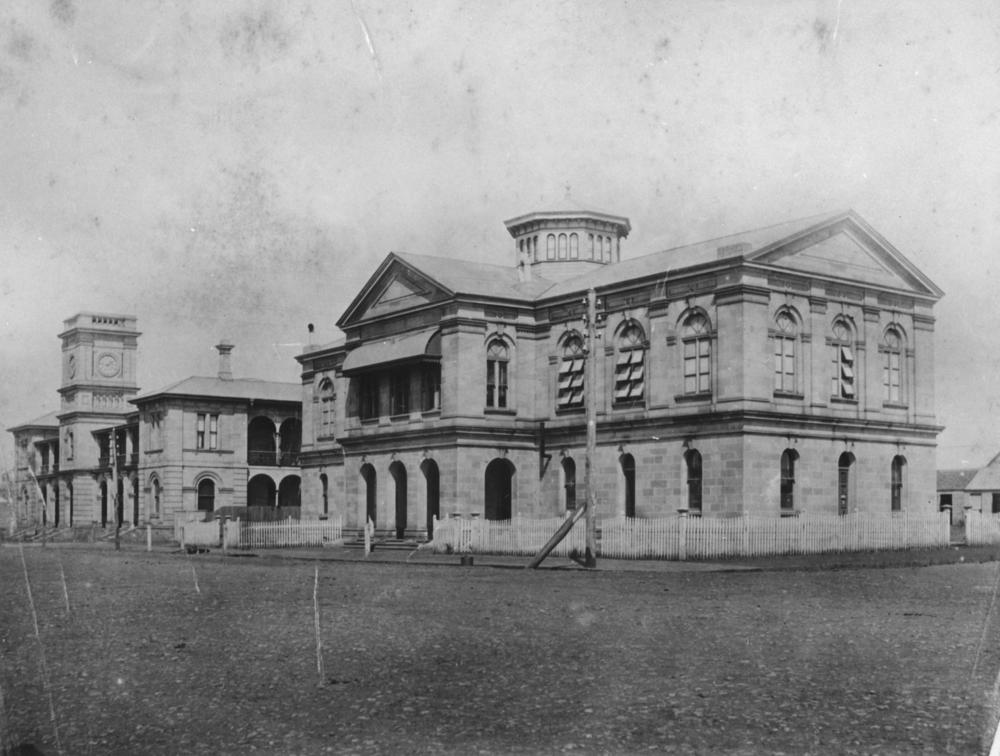
Court House building, ~1884

The Toowoomba Court House is located at the corner of Margaret and Neil Streets, one of the main intersections in Toowoomba. It is sited adjacent to the Toowoomba Post Office and complements it in style, form and material. These two buildings, together with the Police Station in Neil Street form a precinct of Government buildings, creating a landmark in the streetscape.

The Court House building comprises the main section facing Margaret Street which is constructed of sandstone. At the rear of this are three additional wings, of which the two end ones are connected to the main section and the central one is freestanding. Although constructed of a different type of stone, the wing facing Neil Street is similar in design to the main section. The remaining two wings are of a more simplistic design and are of a rendered finish which is painted.

New landscaping surrounds the front of the building, whilst the rear of the site is asphalted for use as a carpark. The original stables, reconstructed as a garage, are located at the rear of the site behind the eastern wing.

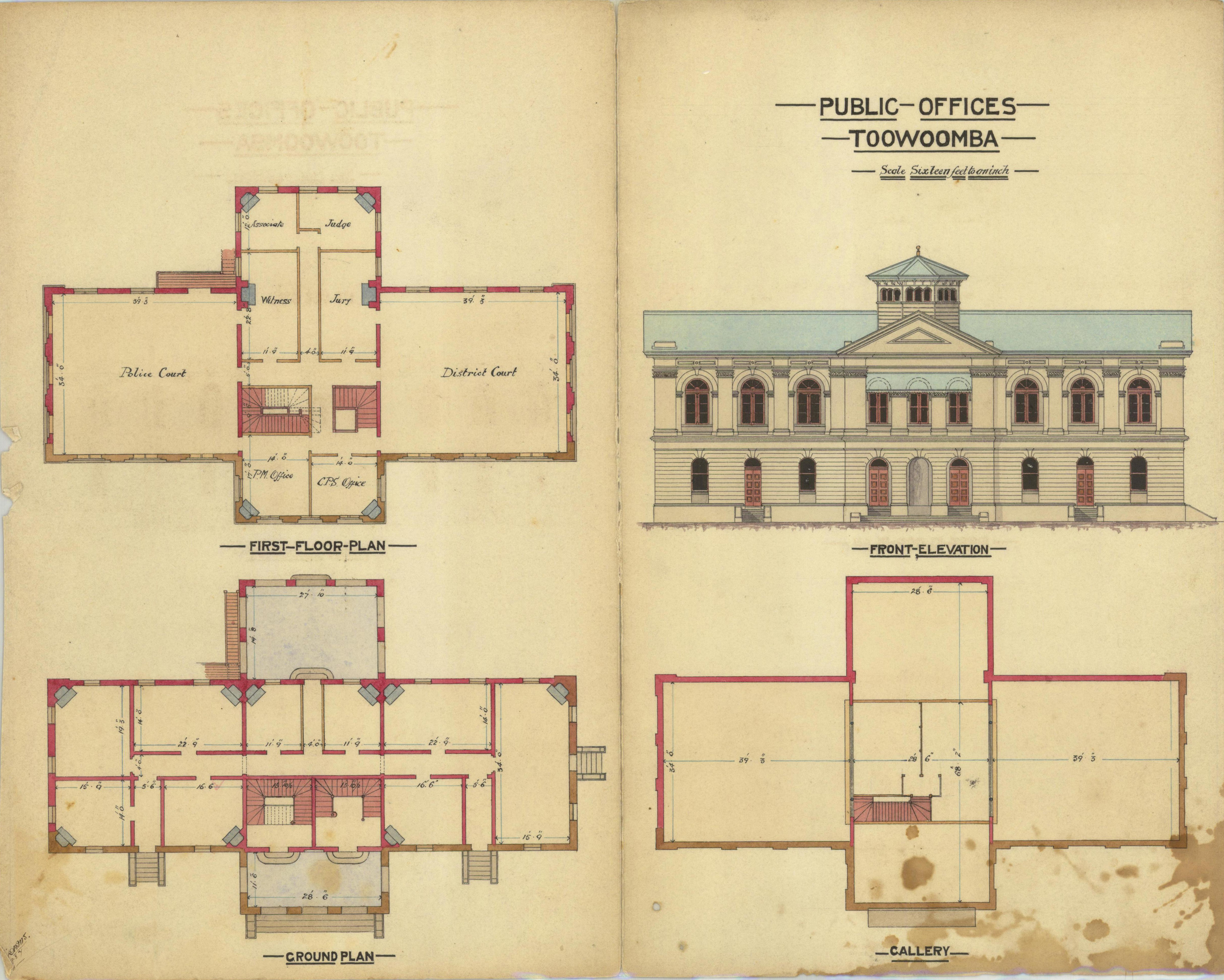
Architectural drawing of the Court House, 1887

The building is accessed by a set of shallow steps which lead to a central projecting bay with three open arches at the front and one at each side, creating an open portico at ground level. Within each of the three front arches are sets of wrought iron gates. The pillars between the arches have bases of rock-faced stone, margined and chiselled with simple mouldings above. A keystone is located at the centre of each arch. Entry into the building itself is via two sets of cedar doors with glass panels and side lights. They sit on either side of an arched panel recessed into the wall. The doors on the eastern side enter into a ground floor office, whilst the western doors open into an entrance space in front of the central staircase.

The first level is enclosed, with three sets of double hung windows with fanlights positioned above the three archways at the front and above the archways at either end. The solid sections between the windows form engaged pilasters with decorative relief carved capitals and simply moulded bases. Smaller decorative panels are located between each window at the height of the window head. A triangular gable is located over the projected bay with 1878–1979 in bronze within the gable and the words COURT HOUSE in bronze lettering across the entablature. Behind the central gable is an octagonal light lantern which internally, is located over the court house gallery.

The pattern of windows separated by engaged pilasters continues across the front of the building, with keystones above each fanlight. The side elevations of this section of the building are similar in detail to the front, with similar windows, but no pilaster detail. Doors are located on the eastern side and comprise two narrow leaves which are panelled, with a fanlight above.

The ground level of the Neil Street wing is constructed of a darker stone, which is ?-faced. A centrally located door with a semi-circular protruding hood is flanked by three deeply recessed arched windows. The door itself is recessed within a timber lined section and is of glass with an aluminium frame.

The upper section of the wing is rendered and painted with seven evenly spaced rectangular windows, deeply recessed with aluminium frames. An entablature divides the ground and first levels and another is located at the top of the first floor, surmounted by a parapet. The southern elevation of this wing is rendered and painted on both levels, with arched windows on the lower level and corresponding rectangular windows on the upper level.

The remaining two rear wings are similar in design to the rendered section of the Neil Street wing, with the easternmost wing having an external timber stair at the rear.

The building has a gabled roof, the main part of which runs east west and is intersected by the gable of the porch and the hipped roofs of the rear wings.

Internally the building has been substantially altered. The most intact areas are the central staircase and the court room, now used as a lecture theatre. The court room retains many original features including decorative cast iron columns supporting the gallery, timber trusses, cedar joinery and an octagonal light lantern.

Original details such as joinery and fireplaces are evident in some areas, but new partitioning and reconfiguration of the spaces to connect with the rear wings has reduced the original spaces. Features of interest but not part of the original fabric include 1943 balustrades and stairs which are concrete, natural in colour at the sides and red in the centre.

== Heritage listing ==
Toowoomba Court House was listed on the Queensland Heritage Register on 21 October 1992 having satisfied the following criteria.

The place is important in demonstrating the evolution or pattern of Queensland's history.

The Toowoomba Court House is located at the intersection of Margaret and Neil Streets and was constructed between 1876 and 1878. It is the third known Court House to be constructed on the Darling Downs, the first of which was at Drayton. As such it demonstrates the development of the district and consequently, the evolution of Queensland's history.

The place is important in demonstrating the principal characteristics of a particular class of cultural places.

The Toowoomba Court House demonstrates the principal characteristics of a building of its type, externally as a substantial government building of classical style, and internally by the retention of the Court Room space.

The place is important because of its aesthetic significance.

Located at one of the main intersections in Toowoomba, it is a landmark in the town and a strong feature in the streetscape. A precinct of Government buildings is formed by the Court House, the adjacent Toowoomba Post Office and the Police Station in Neil Street.

The Toowoomba Court House is of considerable aesthetic significance due to its landmark qualities and for its high degree of design and workmanship. This includes the exterior stonework and detailing of joinery, both internally and externally, and the sensitive quality of the additions.

The place has a special association with the life or work of a particular person, group or organisation of importance in Queensland's history.

The place has strong associations with architect J C Nowland who was responsible for the design of the 1943 additions.
