= Maryborough Airport =

Maryborough Airport may refer to:

- Maryborough Airport (Queensland), in Maryborough, Queensland, Australia
- Maryborough Airport (Victoria), in Maryborough, Victoria, Australia
