= Maryborough railway station =

Maryborough railway station may refer to:

- Maryborough railway station, Queensland
- Maryborough railway station, Victoria
- Maryborough West railway station, Queensland
- Portlaoise railway station, Irish station formerly known as Maryborough
