= Toowoomba Post Office =

Former post office in Queensland, Australia

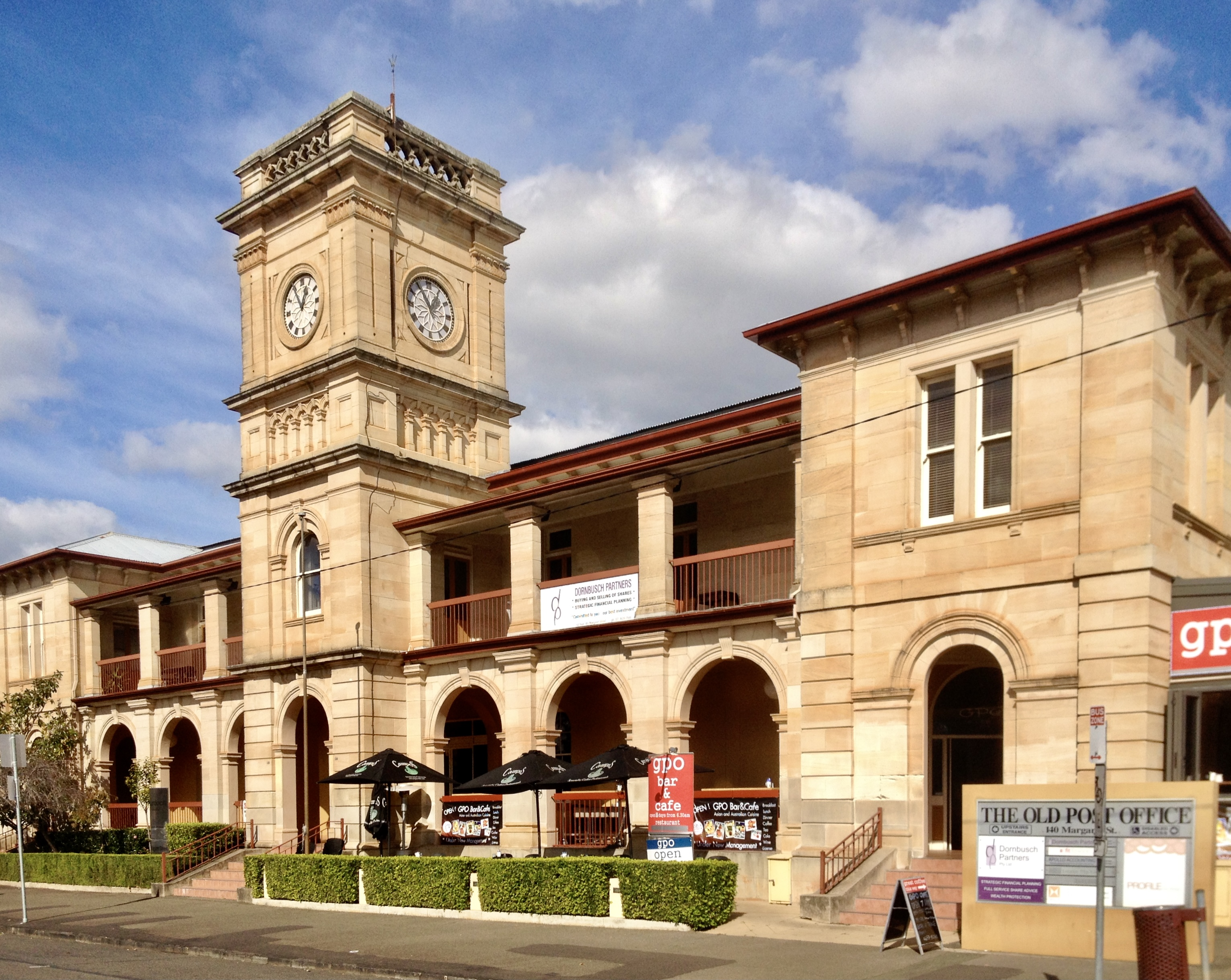
- Toowoomba Post Office, 2014

- Location within Queensland Location within Australia
- 27.5618°S 151.9562°E
- Location: 136 Margaret Street, Toowoomba City, Toowoomba, Toowoomba Region, Queensland, Australia

History
- Design period: 1870s–1890s (late 19th century)
- Built: 1878–1908

Site notes
- Architect: Francis Drummond Greville Stanley
- Architectural style: Classicism

Queensland Heritage Register
- Official name: Toowoomba Post Office (former)
- Type: state heritage (built)
- Designated: 24 January 2003
- Reference no.: 600847
- Significant period: 1878–1908 (fabric); 1870s–1990s (historical, social)
- Significant components: residential accommodation – post master's house/quarters, residential accommodation – telegraph master's house/quarters, tower – clock, post & telegraph office
- Builders: John Gargett

Toowoomba Post Office is a heritage-listed former post office at 136 Margaret Street, Toowoomba City, Toowoomba, Toowoomba Region, Queensland, Australia. It was designed by Francis Drummond Greville Stanley and built from 1878 to 1908 by John Gargett. It was added to the Queensland Heritage Register on 24 January 2003.

== History ==
The Toowoomba Post Office, of which construction was completed in 1880, is one of three extant post offices built in the Classic Revival Style, with the other two at Maryborough (1866) and central Brisbane (1871). The fourth building of this type was at Dalby (1867), but is now demolished.

The opening and closing of "Postal Stations" reflected the fortunes of some of the more precarious settlements and indicates some of the difficulties faced by the Postal Department in providing services. Where the establishment of towns was closely connected with the opening of a railway, Post Offices were often at the railway station, where mail was received and sent, and where the Telegraph Office could benefit by the sharing of equipment with the Railway. The Post Office was one of the first Government functions to be established in a locality, and the need for regular communication was closely followed or sometimes preceded by the Police Station.

The period between 1859–1879 marked the separation of the Post and Telegraph Departments and a wide range of buildings appeared throughout Queensland to accommodate both functions. It was also the principal period of colonisation, with Government architect F. D. G. Stanley in charge of design and construction of post offices from 1872–1880, when a series of grand Post and Telegraph buildings were erected in both masonry and timber in the major provincial centres, of which Toowoomba was one.

The first postal service on the Darling Downs comprised a pack-horse mail service from Brisbane to Drayton in 1845, which was subsequently upgraded to a horse-drawn coach. By 1864 there were 42 mail services in Queensland, and the following year, Cobb and Co were appointed the official carriers of the state's mail.

The first Electric Telegraph from Brisbane to Toowoomba was established in 1861 as part of the intercolonial route. Subsequent connections extended the line to Dalby, Roma, Charleville and the far north-east. Toowoomba was located at the junction of a number of telegraph routes and subsequently grew in importance. At this stage, the Telegraph office was located in a room in the 1865 Post Office on the corner of Ruthven and Russell Streets. The current Post Office replaced this structure to accommodate the need for both Post and Telegraph services.

Tenders for a new building to house both the Post and Telegraph offices adjacent to the new courthouse were called in 1877. The tender of John Gargett (also the contractor for the adjacent Court House and Mayor of Toowoomba) for £7250 was accepted. The original tender was for a building constructed of bond brick, however this was later altered to allow for the front tower and one wing (the Court House side) in cut stone at a new price of £8100. The stone used was pale yellow sandstone quarried from Highfields and was similar to that used in the construction of the courthouse, also quarried from Highfields. The new building opened in 1880, with delays due to wet weather, and provided separate facilities for each service, and residential quarters for both the Postmaster and Telegraph Officer. The contract for fitting up the clock was awarded to Mr Schoenle of Ipswich at a cost of £105.

The Toowoomba Post Office is a typical example of the Classical Revival style of architecture popular during this period and forms part of a government precinct which includes the Court House and Police Station. This was a frequent occurrence due to the Queensland Colonial Government's practice of acquiring, or retaining for itself, land suitable for government uses.

Since its construction in 1878, the Toowoomba Post Office has undergone substantial alterations due to changes in communication technology. The original layout comprised a two storeyed front section with single storeyed rear wings forming a U-shaped structure. The ground floor housed the post office and quarters for the Postmaster on the western side, and the telegraph office and quarters for the Telegraph Officer on the eastern side. Additional residential rooms were housed in the front section of the first floor. In 1896, bathrooms were added to both Living Quarters. More substantial additions were made in 1899, when a new mail room and battery were added to the rear of the building and an additional level was constructed over the Telegraph Officer's Living Quarters.

Later additions were also carried out which included the re-arrangement of the ground floor layout and the partial enclosure of the arcade in 1905, and the construction of a new telephone exchange on the first floor over the former Postmaster quarters in 1908. At this stage, the Living Quarters were transformed into workshops and the entire first floor was altered to house the Telephone/Telegraph operations.

In 1960, the first of the newly developed cross bar automatic system in Australia was installed in the Post Office.

The most substantial alterations occurred in 1968 when much of the original fabric, including external cast iron balustrades, timber valances, chimneys and hearths, and 1904 glazing to arcades, was replaced or removed. Everything apart from the 1908 and 1915 telephone exchange sections were removed from the rear of the building and replaced with a flat roofed mail room and loading dock. Little work, apart from general maintenance has been completed since this stage.

In 1999, Australia Post ceased postal operations in the building, relocating to another site. The building was then offered for sale and is now used as a cafe and offices.

== Description ==
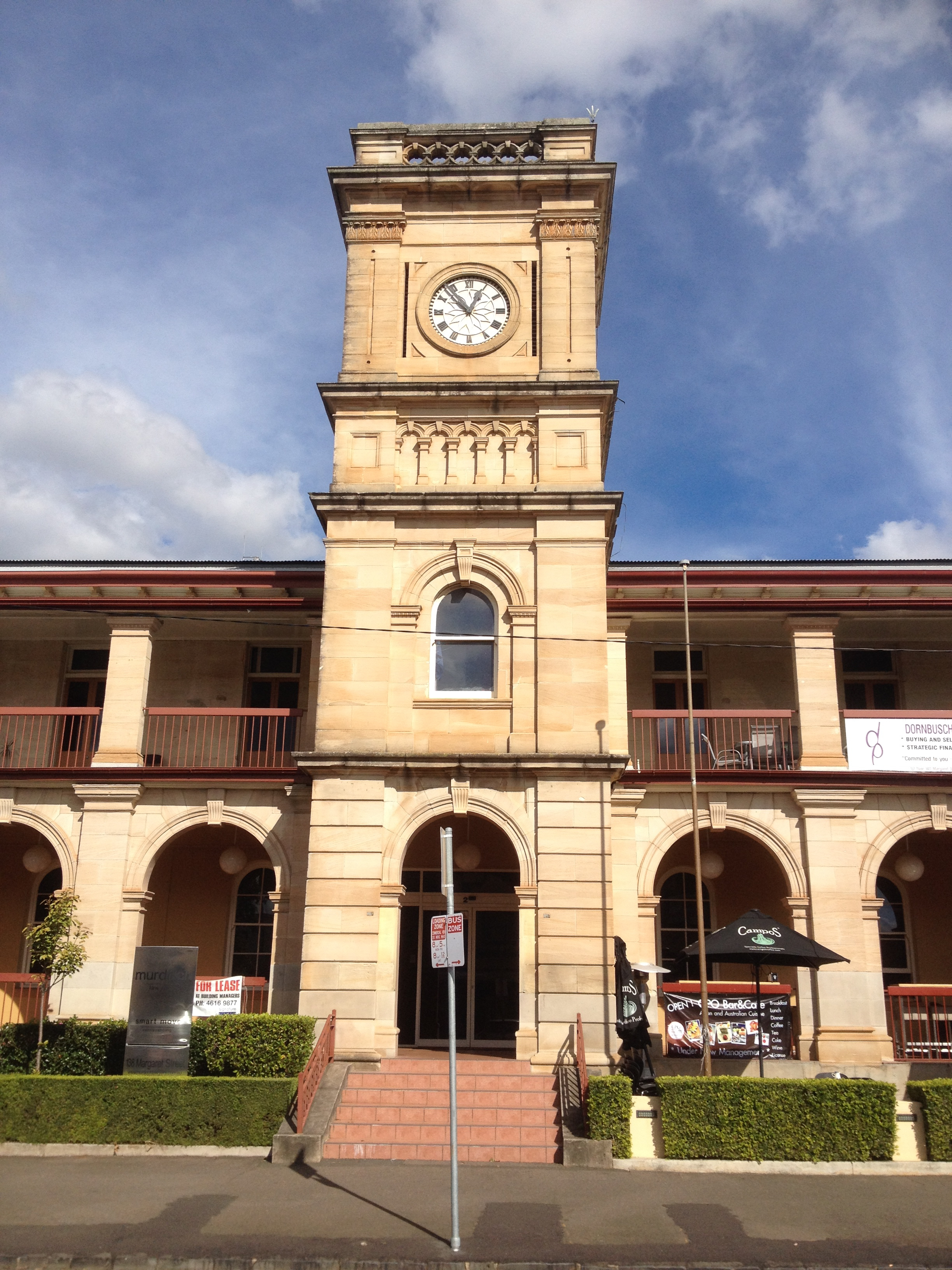
Clocktower, 2014

The Toowoomba Post Office is located on Margaret Street, near one of the main intersections in Toowoomba. It is sited adjacent to the Toowoomba Court House and complements it in style, form and material. These two buildings, together with the Police Station in Neil Street form a precinct of Government buildings, creating a landmark in the streetscape.

The Post Office comprises a two-storeyed front section with rear wings at either side which are also two-storeyed. Single storeyed extensions project from the rear of each of the wings. The originally open space formed by the U-shape of the front section and wings is covered with a flat roof with a sky light in the centre.

The front of the building is symmetrically designed around a central clock tower which displays four faces. The front facade and the external side of the western wing are faced with pale yellow sandstone, whilst the rear wings are rendered.

The building dominates the site which is asphalted at the rear and paved with gardens down each side.

The front section comprises the central projecting bay of the clock tower flanked by arcades with projecting sections at each end forming corner entrances. A series of arches divided by engaged pilasters with egg and dart moulding to the capitals are located across the face of each arcade. Simple metal balustrades with square profile balusters are located within each arch, and keystones are located above, at the centre of each arch. The end and central bays also have arched openings, with drip moulds above those at each end, and a key stone above the central arch. Quoins are located on the corners of each of the bays.

There are three entrances into the building; two which are set diagonally at each corner, and a central one under the clock tower. All comprise double timber doors with large arched fanlights above. All doors lead into the post office service area which has been substantially altered. It now consists of a service counter running along the east–west axis with a display area in front.

The first level repeats the pattern of the ground level, with verandahs supported by stone columns with egg and dart moulding, separated by the end and central projecting bays are, which are enclosed. The end bays have a pair of tall, thin windows and the central bay has a more decorative arched window surrounded by a series of carved mouldings.

The main section of the building has a corrugated iron hipped roof, with decorative stone and timber brackets evenly spaced underneath the eaves. The central clock tower projects through the roof and comprises three sections. The base has decorative panels featuring a carved repetitive arch pattern. This is surmounted by the central section in which the clockfaces are located and an upper section of cornice and pierced parapet. Engaged pilasters rise through the base and central sections and are capped with carved acanthus leaves.

The eastern facade is rendered and has a side entrance contained within a recess which has a verandah at the second level. Arched timber valances are located above the ground and first floor levels and a balustrade the same as those at the front is located on the first level. Apart from this section, the eastern side is enclosed, with a variety of windows located along its length.

The western facade has an arcade at ground level which contains post boxes and private mail boxes. The sandstone of the front facade wraps partially around the western facade, with a rendered finish to the remainder of the wing. The double timber doors and winch of an early loading bay survive on the first level.

Internally the building has been substantially altered. The most intact areas are the rooms at the western end on the first level and the clock tower, which still contain early joinery details.

All details to other areas of the building have either been removed or are covered by subsequent additions, making it difficult to define the original layout.

== Heritage listing ==
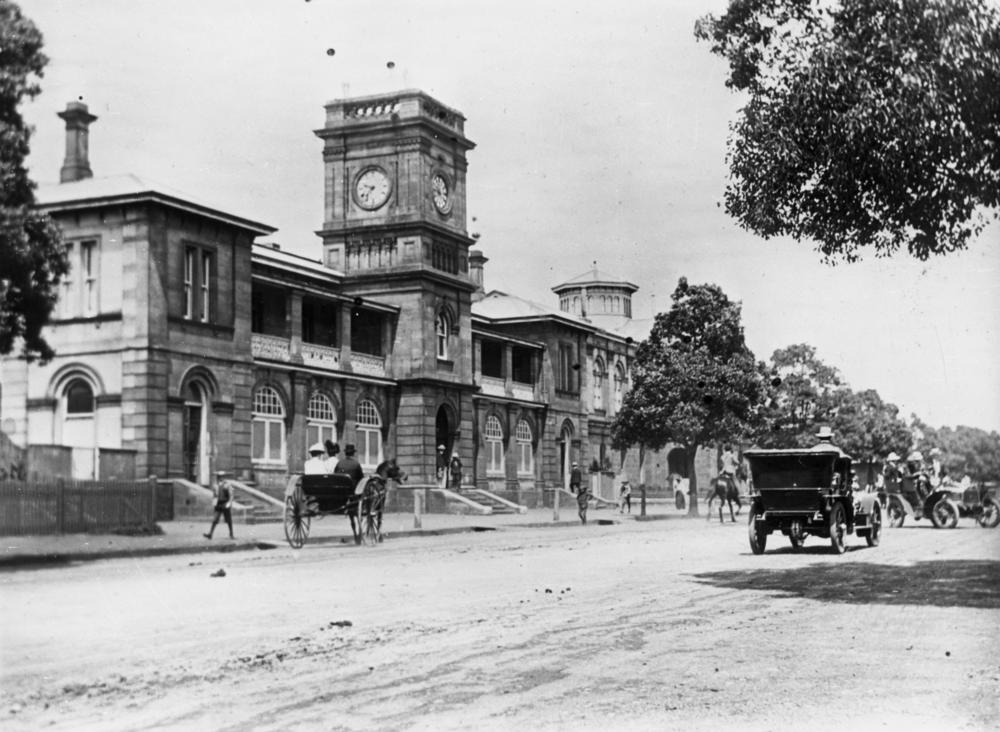
Street scene outside the building, ~1909

Toowoomba Post Office (former) was listed on the Queensland Heritage Register on 24 January 2003 having satisfied the following criteria.

The place is important in demonstrating the evolution or pattern of Queensland's history.

The Toowoomba Post Office is located in Margaret Street and was constructed between 1878 and 1880. As a major staging point on the intercolonial telegraph, is demonstrative of the development of the state of Queensland. The Toowoomba Post Office is evidence of the importance of the town as a major inland centre, and of its recognition as such by the government.

The place is important in demonstrating the principal characteristics of a particular class of cultural places.

The Toowoomba Post Office is one of three extant post offices built in the Classic Revival Style. It demonstrates the principal characteristics of this building type with the use of masonry construction, and classical form and detailing.

The place is important because of its aesthetic significance.

Located near one of the main intersections in Toowoomba, it is a landmark in the town and a strong feature in the streetscape. A precinct of Government buildings is formed by the Post Office, the adjacent Toowoomba Court House and the Police Station in Neil Street. The Toowoomba Post Office is of considerable aesthetic significance due to its landmark qualities and for its high degree of design and workmanship, including the exterior stonework.

The place has a strong or special association with a particular community or cultural group for social, cultural or spiritual reasons.

The place has strong associations with past and present residents of the Darling Downs as the primary centre for communication, by mail, telegraph or telephone since 1880.

The place has a special association with the life or work of a particular person, group or organisation of importance in Queensland's history.

It also has special associations with Government architect F D G Stanley who was responsible for the design and construction of Queensland post offices from 1872–1880.
