= Outline of Sydney =

Overview of and topical guide to Sydney

Flag of Sydney

Coat of arms of Sydney

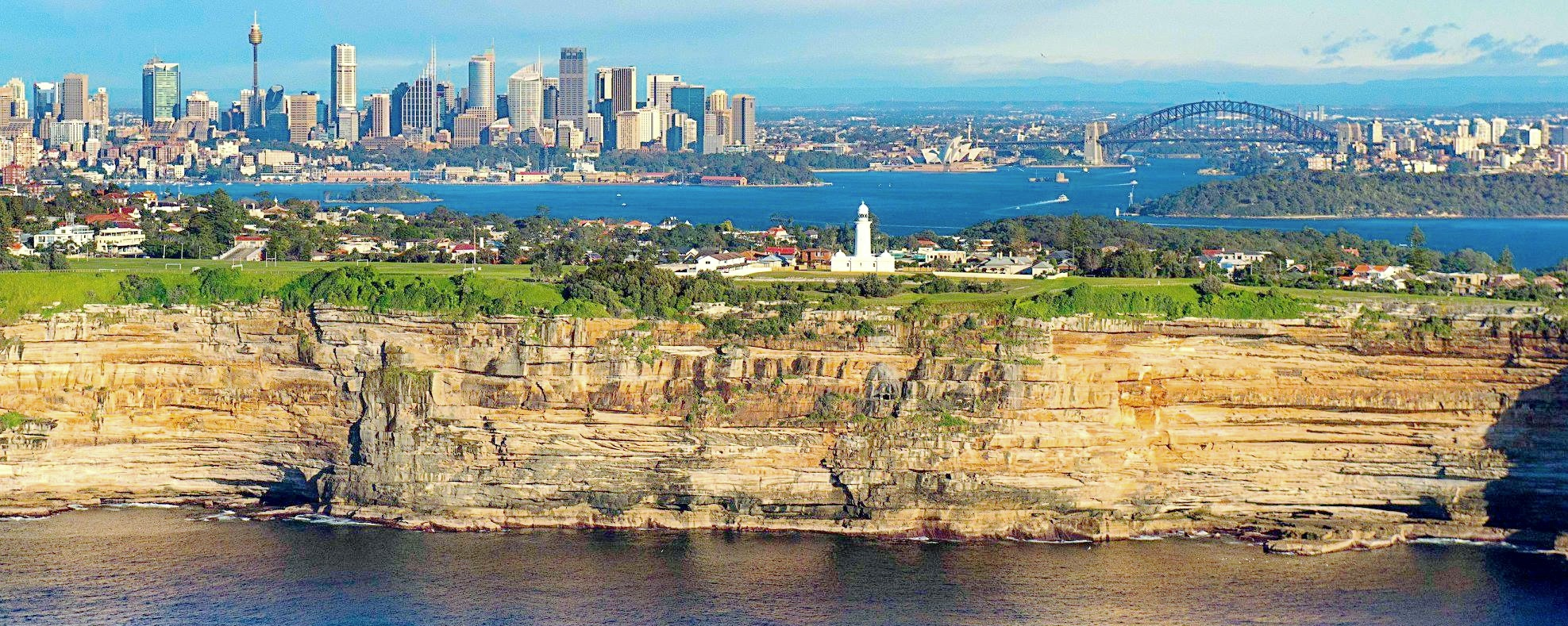
Sydney skyline and sandstone cliffs as viewed from the Tasman Sea, overlooking Vaucluse and Dover Heights.

The following outline is provided as an overview of and topical guide to Sydney:

Sydney –

== General reference ==
- Pronunciation: English: /ˈsɪdni/
- Common English name(s): Sydney
- Official English name(s): Sydney
- Adjectival(s): Sydneysider
- Demonym(s): Sydneysider

== Geography of Sydney ==
Geography of Sydney

- Sydney is:
  - a city
  - a state capital
    - capital of New South Wales
- Population of Sydney: 5,029,768
- Area of Sydney: 12,367.7 km^{2} (4,775.2 sq mi)
- Atlas of Sydney

Sydney
- Location within Australia
- Coordinates: 33°51′54″S 151°12′34″E

=== Location of Sydney ===
- Sydney is situated within the following regions:
  - Southern Hemisphere and Eastern Hemisphere
    - Oceania
      - Australasia
        - Australia (continent)
          - Australia (outline)
            - New South Wales
- Time zone(s):
  - Australian Eastern Standard Time (UTC+10)
  - In Summer (DST): Australian Eastern Daylight Time (UTC+11)

=== Environment of Sydney ===
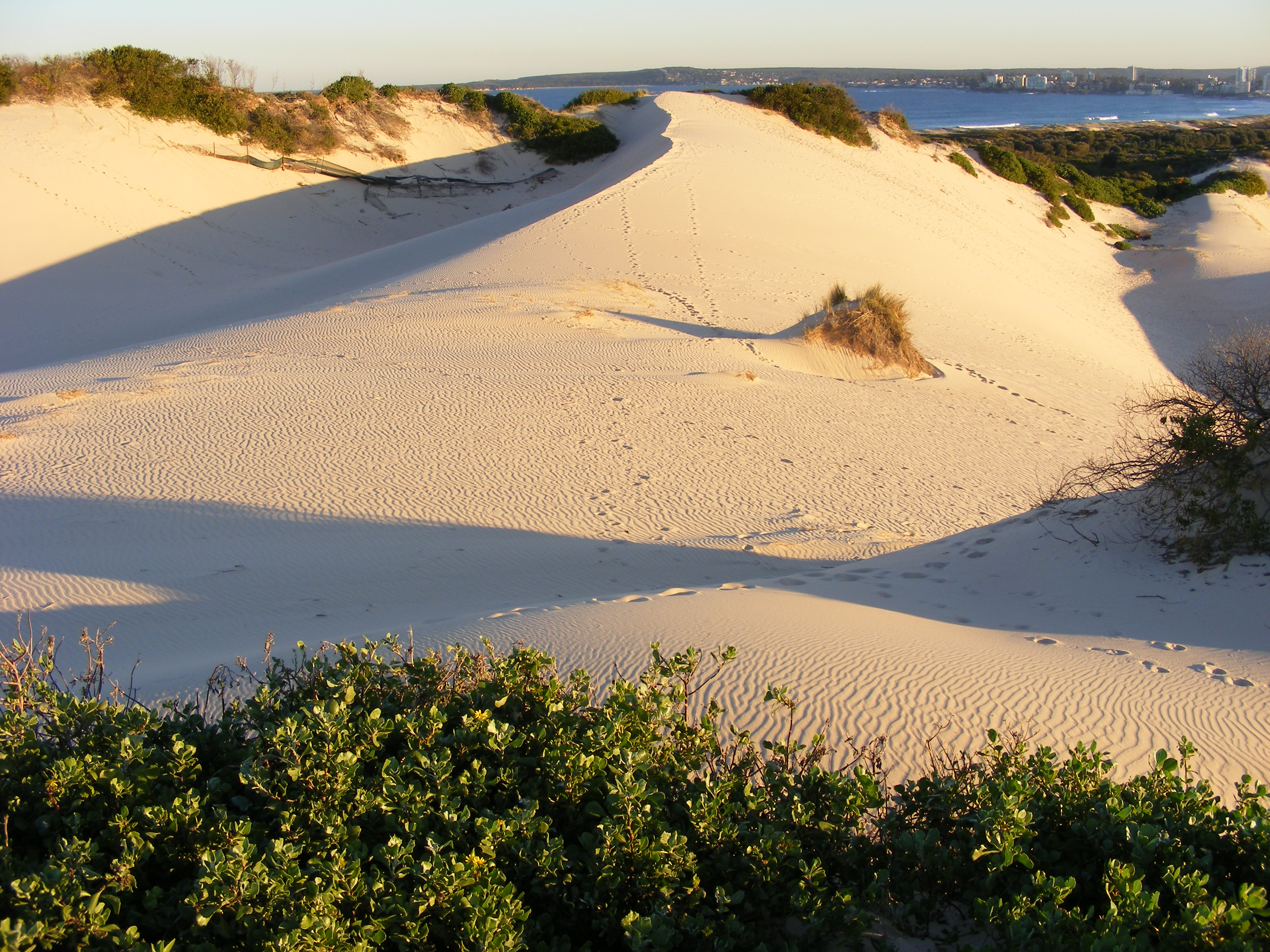
Cronulla sand dunes

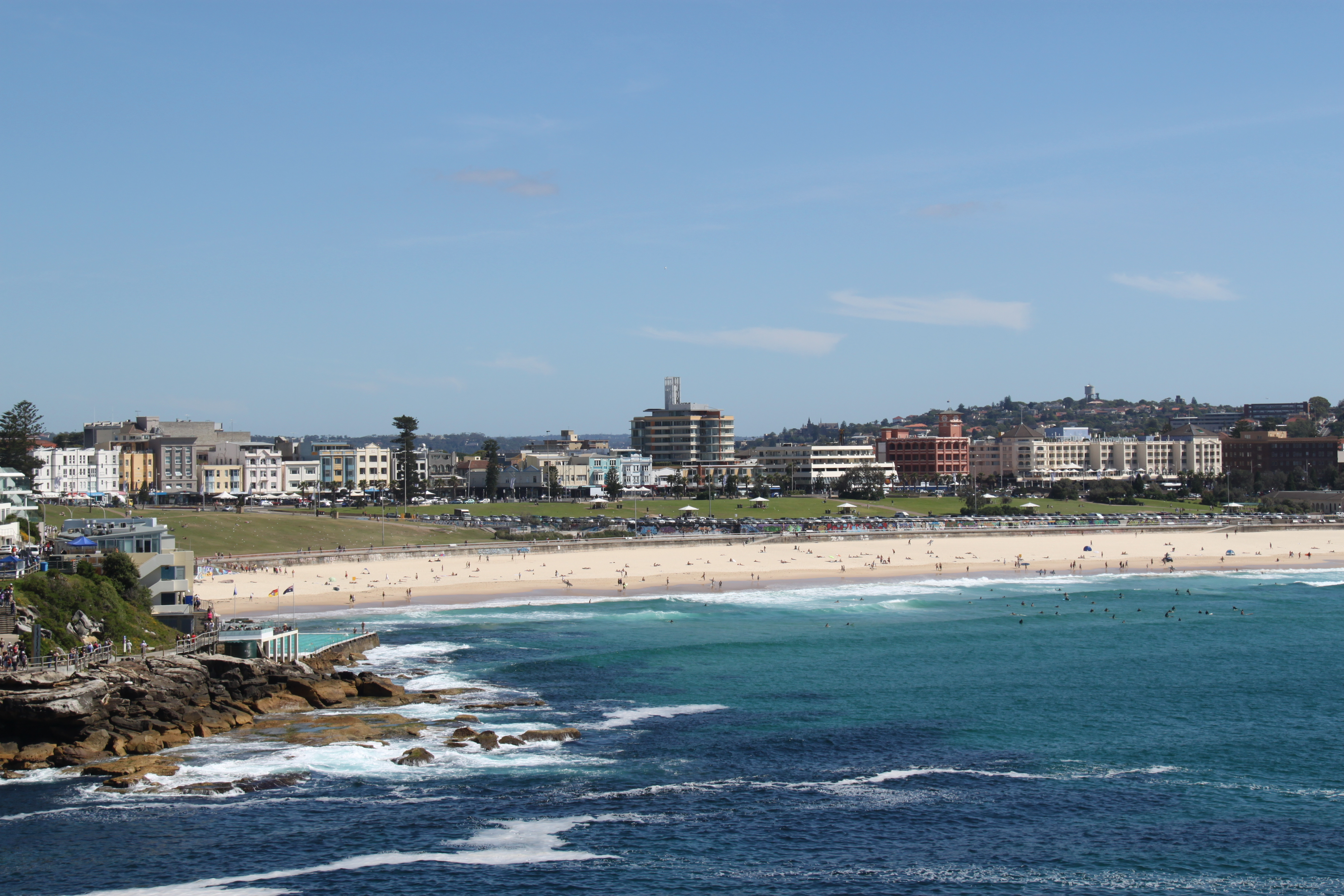
Bondi Beach

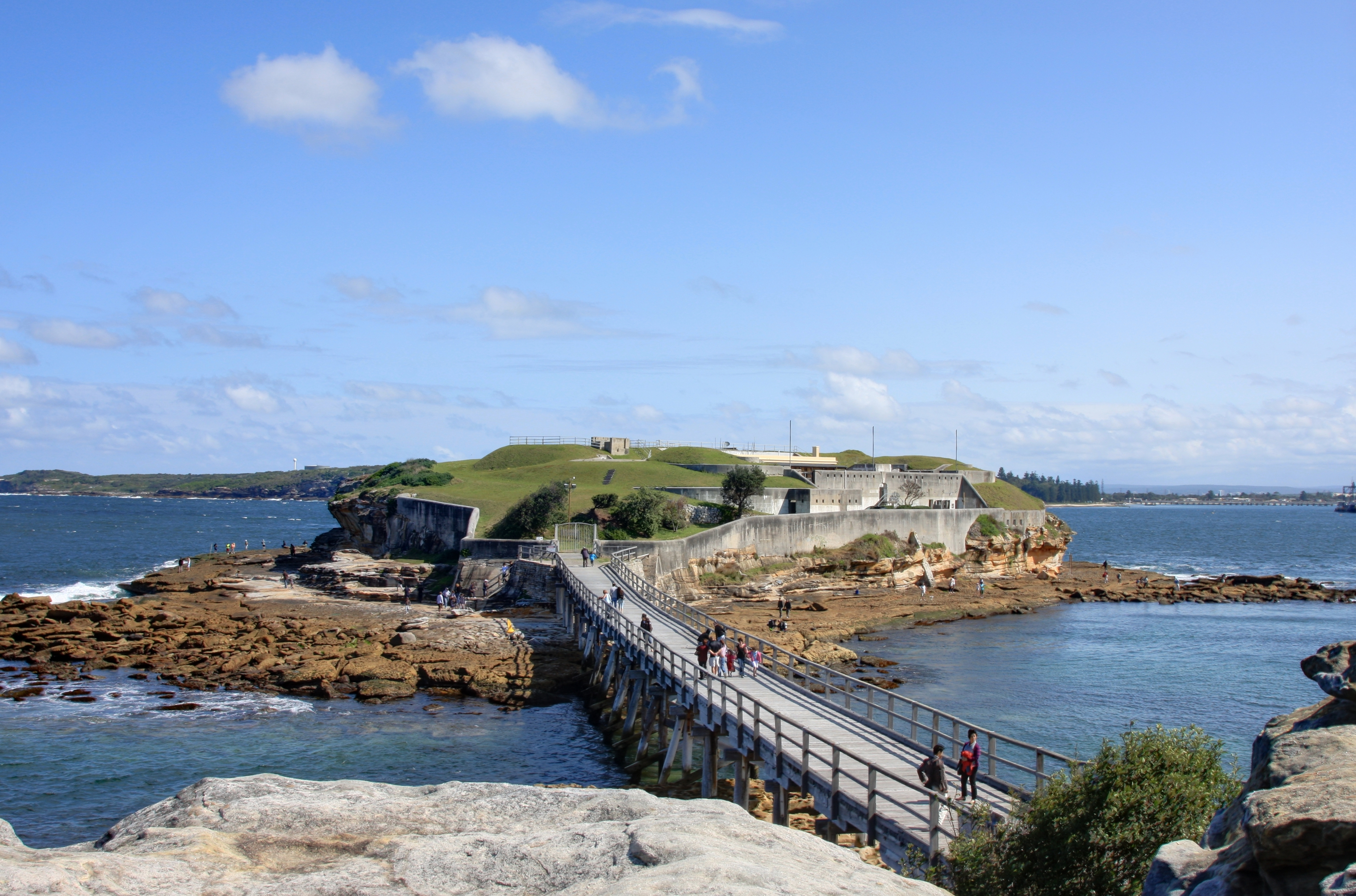
Bare Island

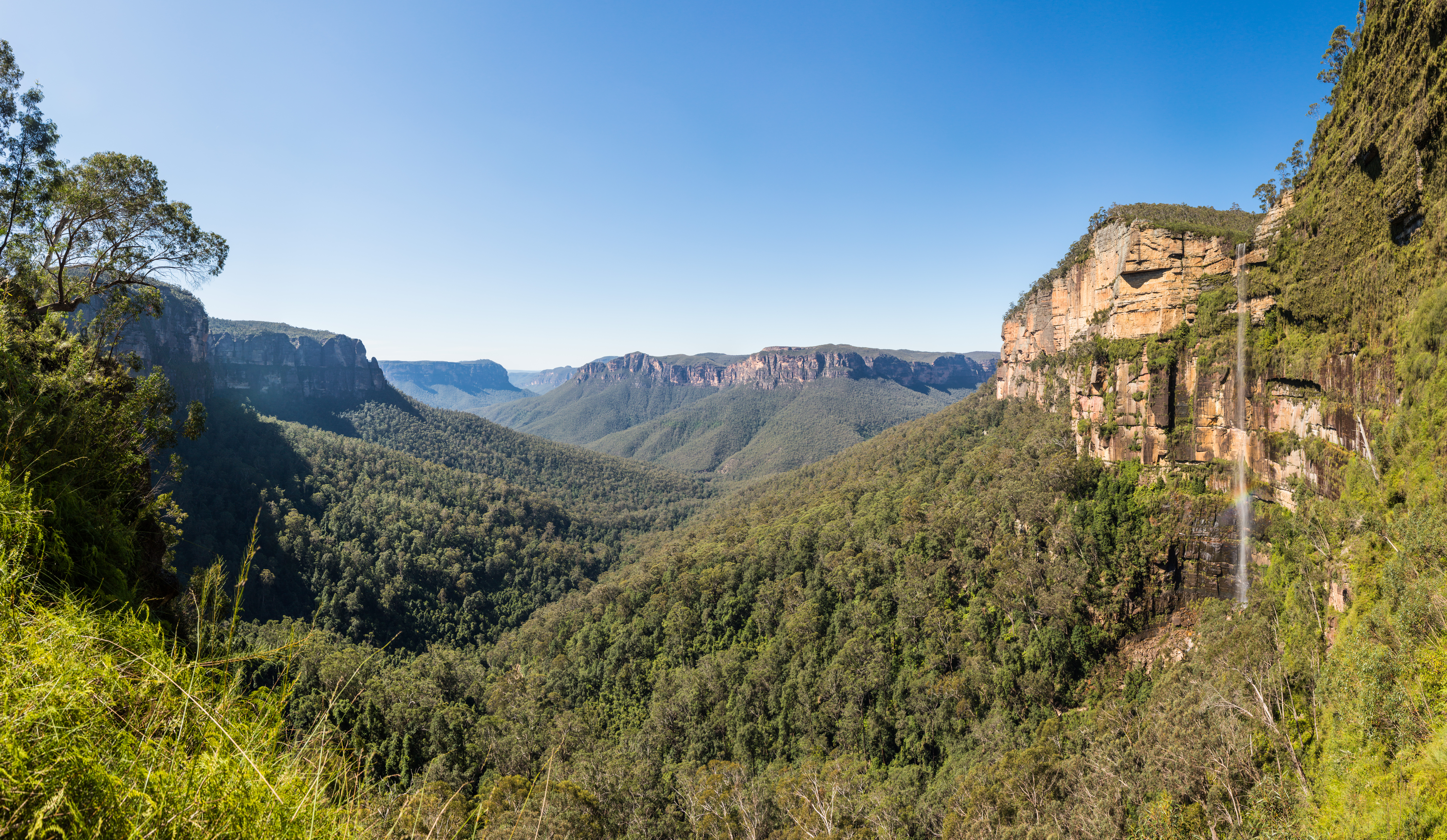
The Blue Mountains

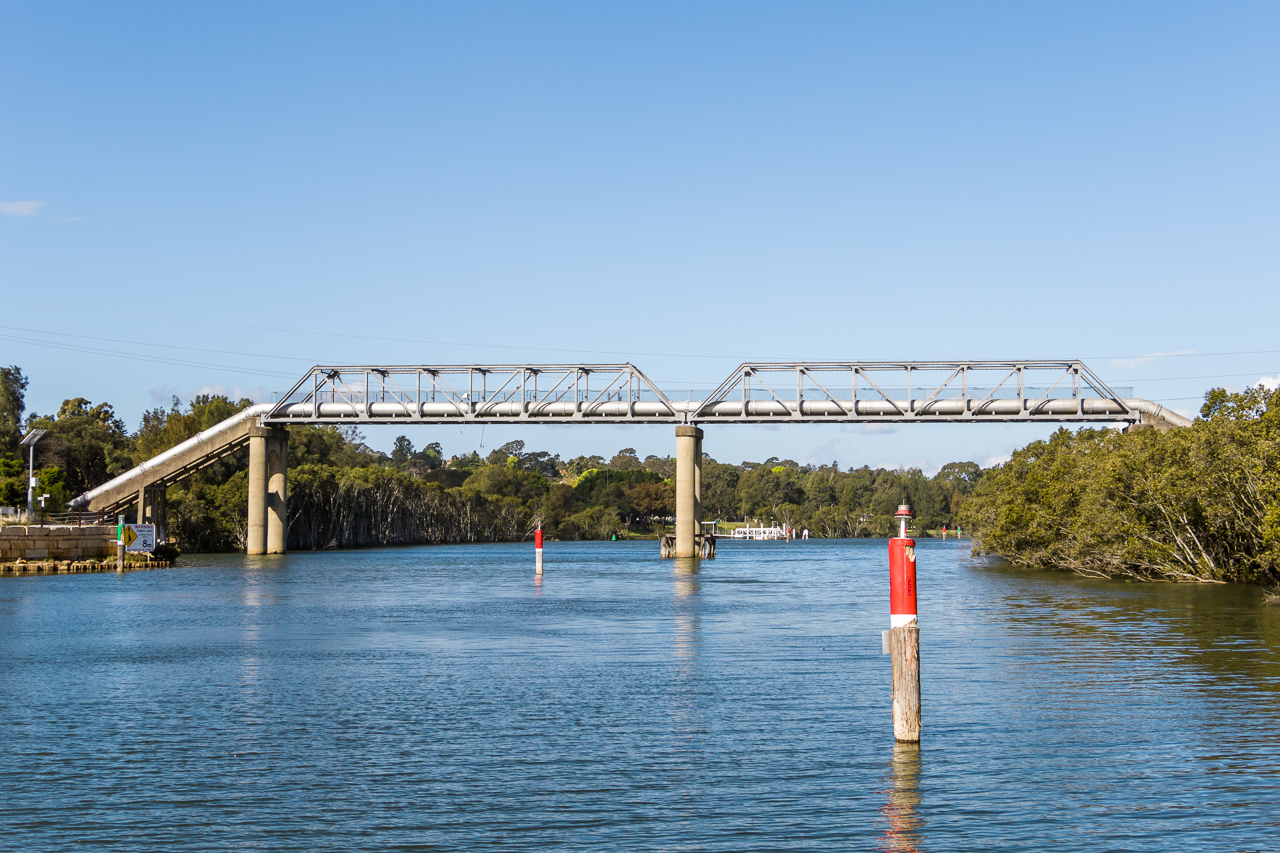
Parramatta River

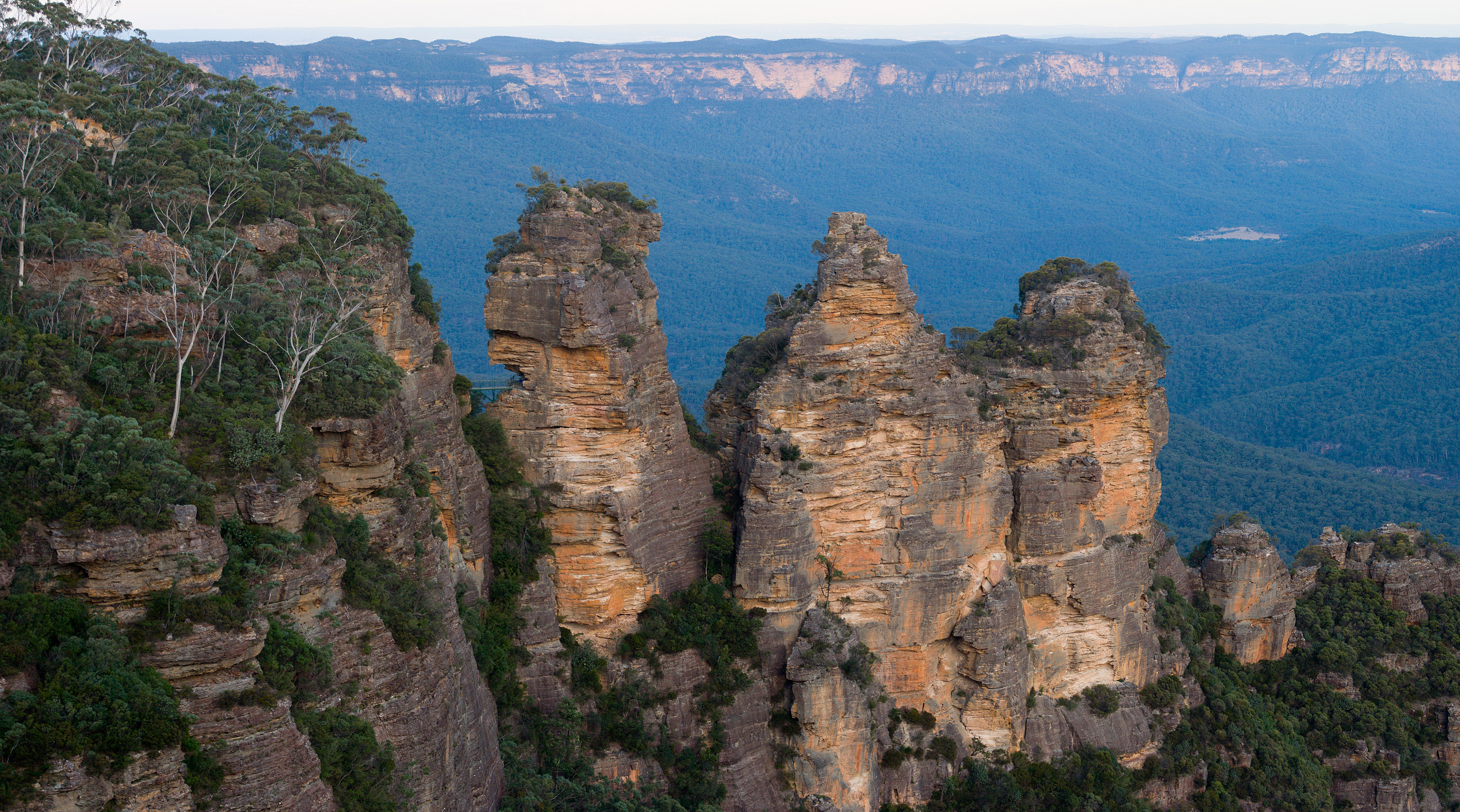
The Three Sisters, sandstone rock formations in the Blue Mountains

- Climate of Sydney

==== Natural geographic features of Sydney ====
- Bays in Sydney
  - Botany Bay
  - Cockle Bay
  - Farm Cove
  - Sydney Cove
- Beaches in Sydney
  - Bondi Beach
  - Bronte Beach
  - Lady Robinson Beach
  - Manly Beach
  - Northern Beaches
- Dunes in Sydney
  - Cronulla sand dunes
- Harbours in Sydney
  - Circular Quay
  - Darling Harbour
  - Port Jackson
    - Middle Harbour
- Headlands and cliffs in Sydney
  - Bradleys Head
  - The Gap
  - Sydney Heads
- Islands in Sydney
  - Bare Island
  - Clark Island
  - Cockatoo Island
  - Goat Island
  - Rodd Island
  - Scotland Island
  - Shark Island
  - Snapper Island
  - Spectacle Island
- Lakes in Sydney
  - Chipping Norton Lake
  - Lake Parramatta
- Mountains in Sydney
  - Blue Mountains
    - Blue Mountains National Park
- Rivers in Sydney
  - Cooks River
  - Georges River
  - Hawkesbury River
  - Nepean River
  - Parramatta River
  - Lane Cove River
- Geology
  - Sydney Basin
  - Sydney sandstone
  - Narrabeen group

=== Areas of Sydney ===
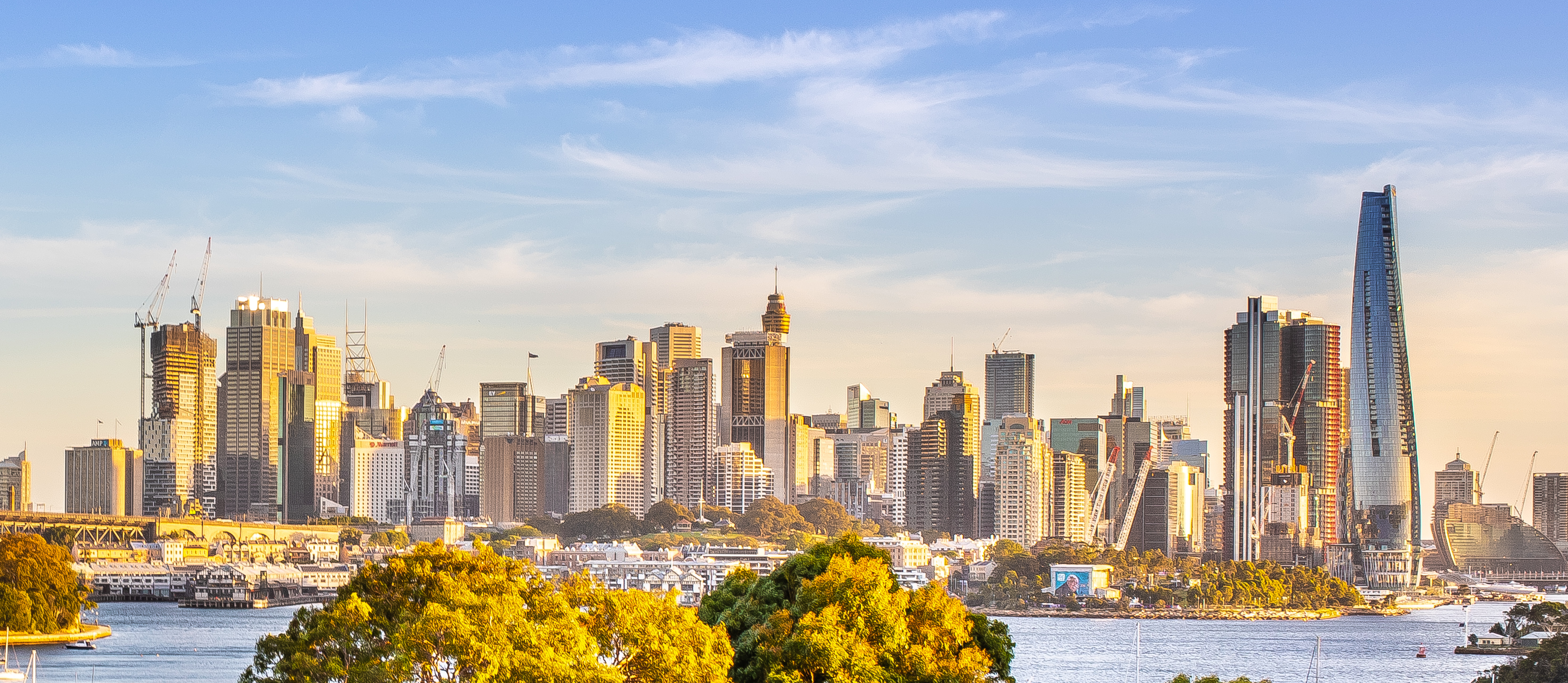
The Sydney central business district

City of Sydney

Regions of Sydney

Suburbs of Sydney

==== Districts of Sydney ====
- Sydney central business district
- North Sydney

==== Neighborhoods (localities) in Sydney ====
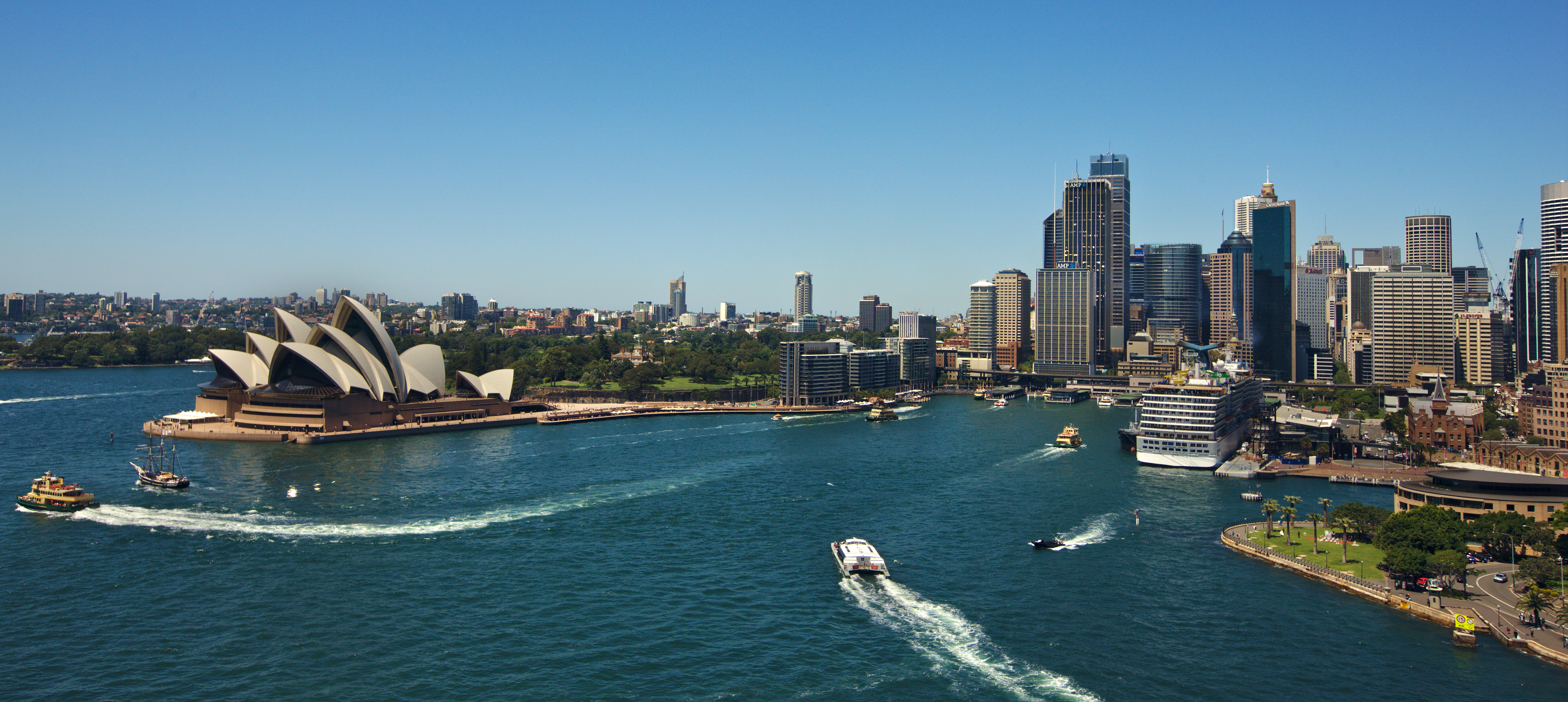
Circular Quay

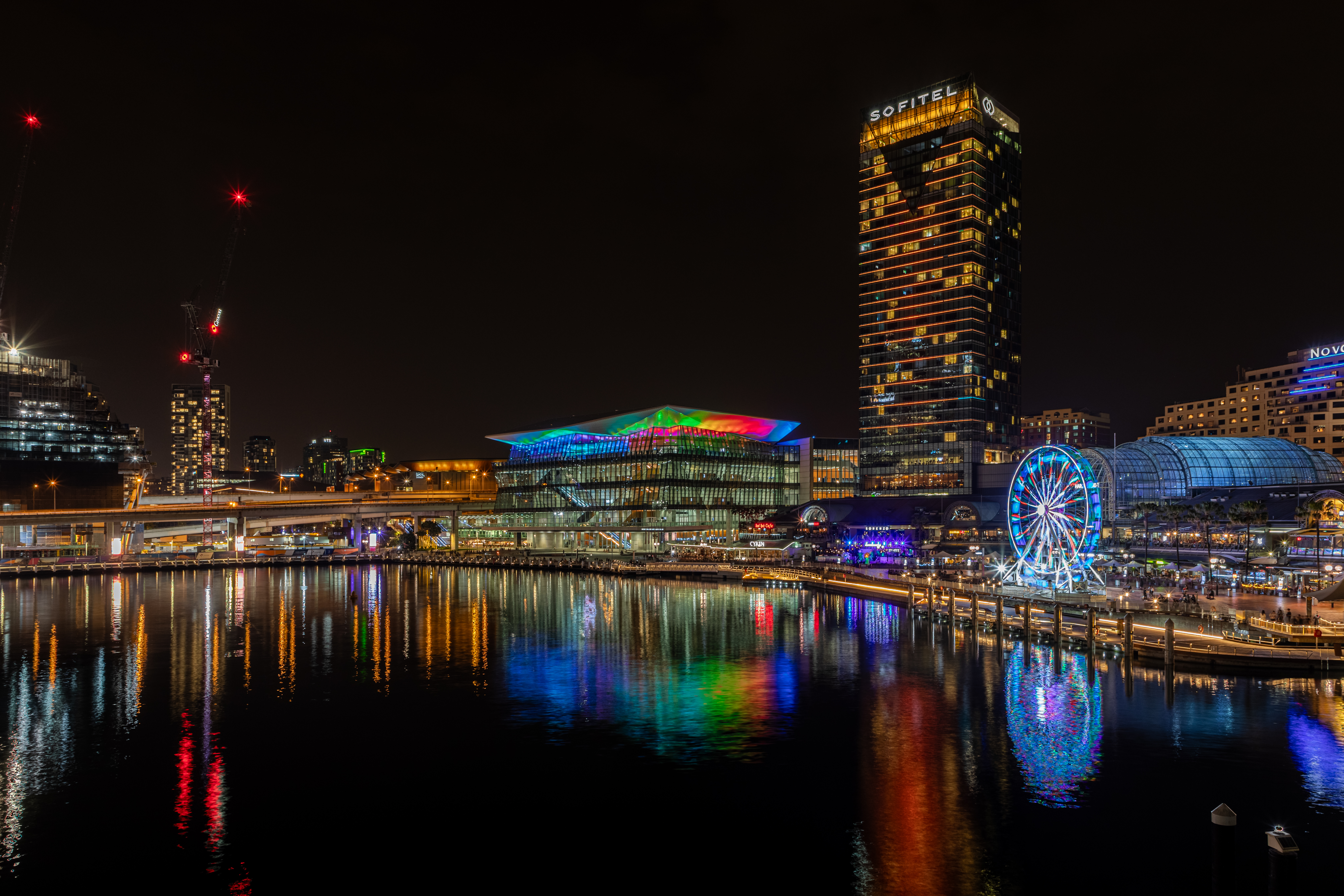
Darling Harbour

- Barangaroo
- Blues Point
- Chinatown
- Circular Quay
- Darling Harbour
- Kings Cross
- Thai Town
- The Rocks

=== Locations in Sydney ===
- Tourist attractions in Sydney
  - Museums in Sydney
  - Shopping areas and markets

==== Bridges in Sydney ====
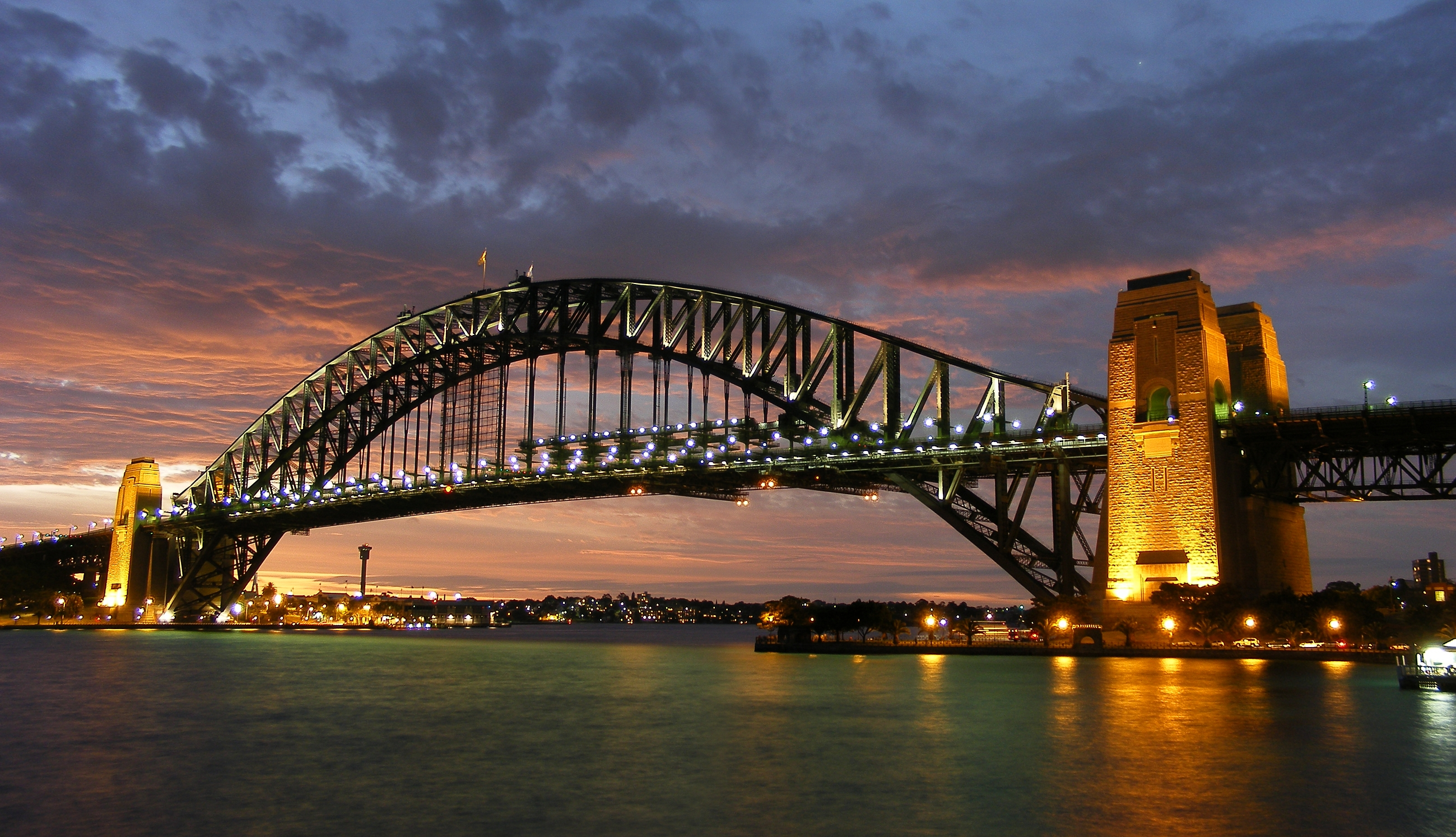
Sydney Harbour Bridge at dusk

Bridges in Sydney

- Anzac Bridge
- Boothtown Aqueduct
- Gladesville Bridge
- Pyrmont Bridge
- Spit Bridge
- Sydney Harbour Bridge

==== Cultural and exhibition centres in Sydney ====
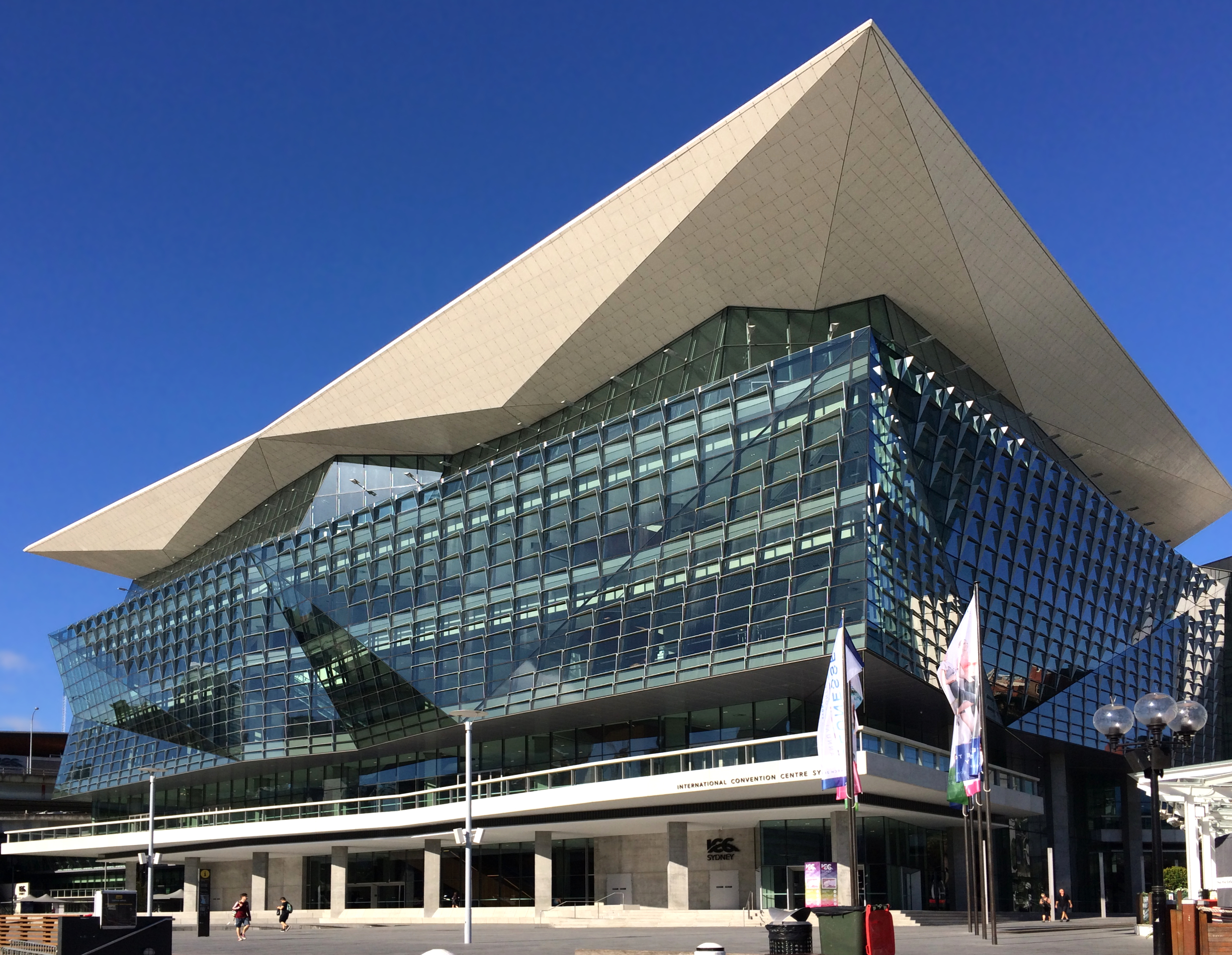
The International Convention Centre

- International Convention Centre Sydney
- The Concourse

==== Forts of Sydney ====
- Fort Denison
  - Fort Denison Light
- Fort Philip

==== Fountains in Sydney ====
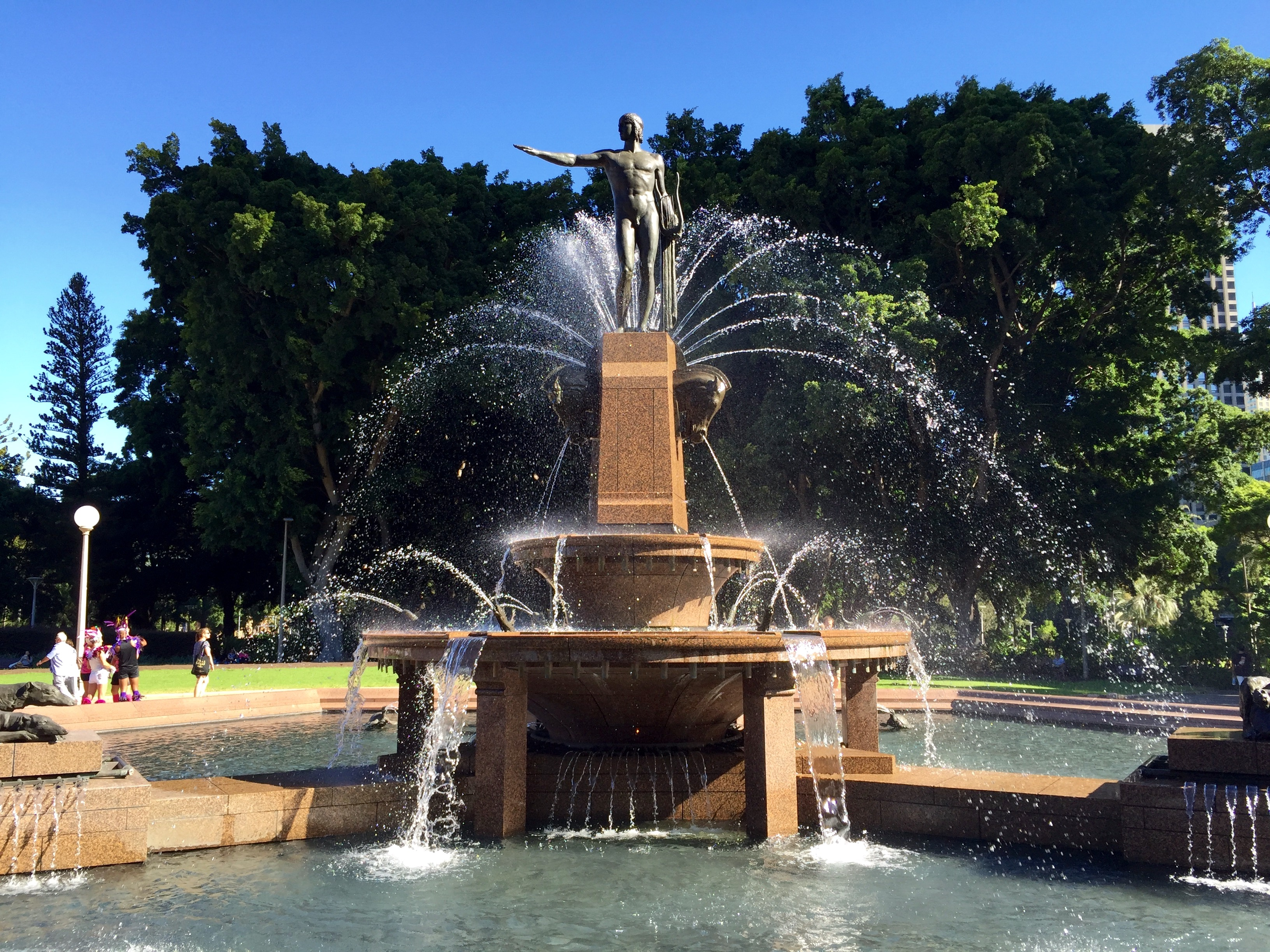
The Archibald Fountain

- Archibald Fountain
- El Alamein Fountain

==== Monuments and memorials in Sydney ====
- Anzac Memorial
- Kokoda Track Memorial Walkway
- Sydney Cenotaph

==== Museums and art galleries in Sydney ====
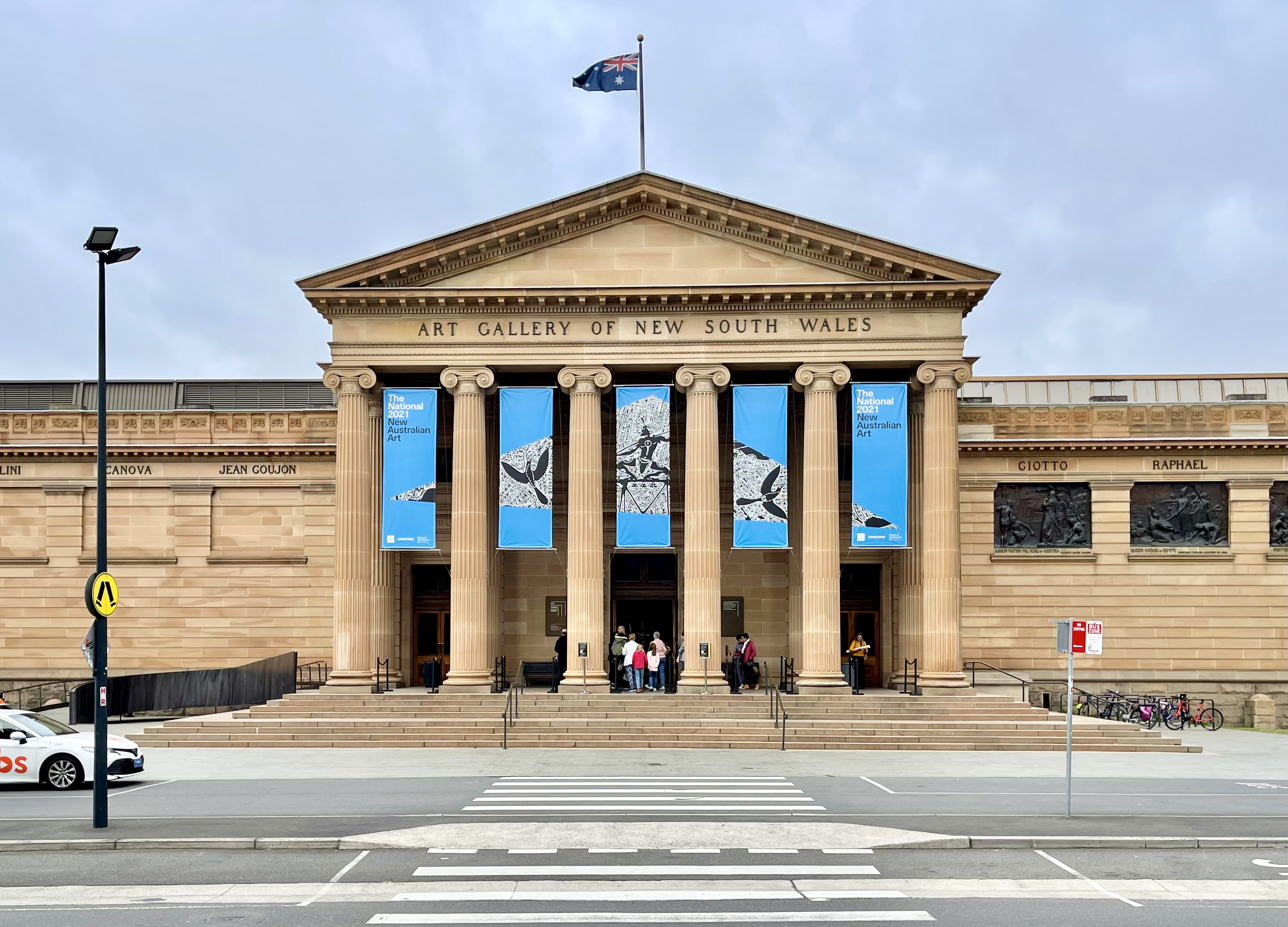
The Art Gallery of New South Wales

Museums in Sydney

- Art Gallery of New South Wales
- Australian Museum
  - James Cook Collection
- Australian National Maritime Museum
- Justice and Police Museum
- Madame Tussauds Sydney
- Manly Art Gallery and Museum
- Museum of Contemporary Art Australia
- Museum of Sydney
- Nicholson Museum
- Powerhouse Museum
- Sydney Tramway Museum

==== Parks and gardens in Sydney ====
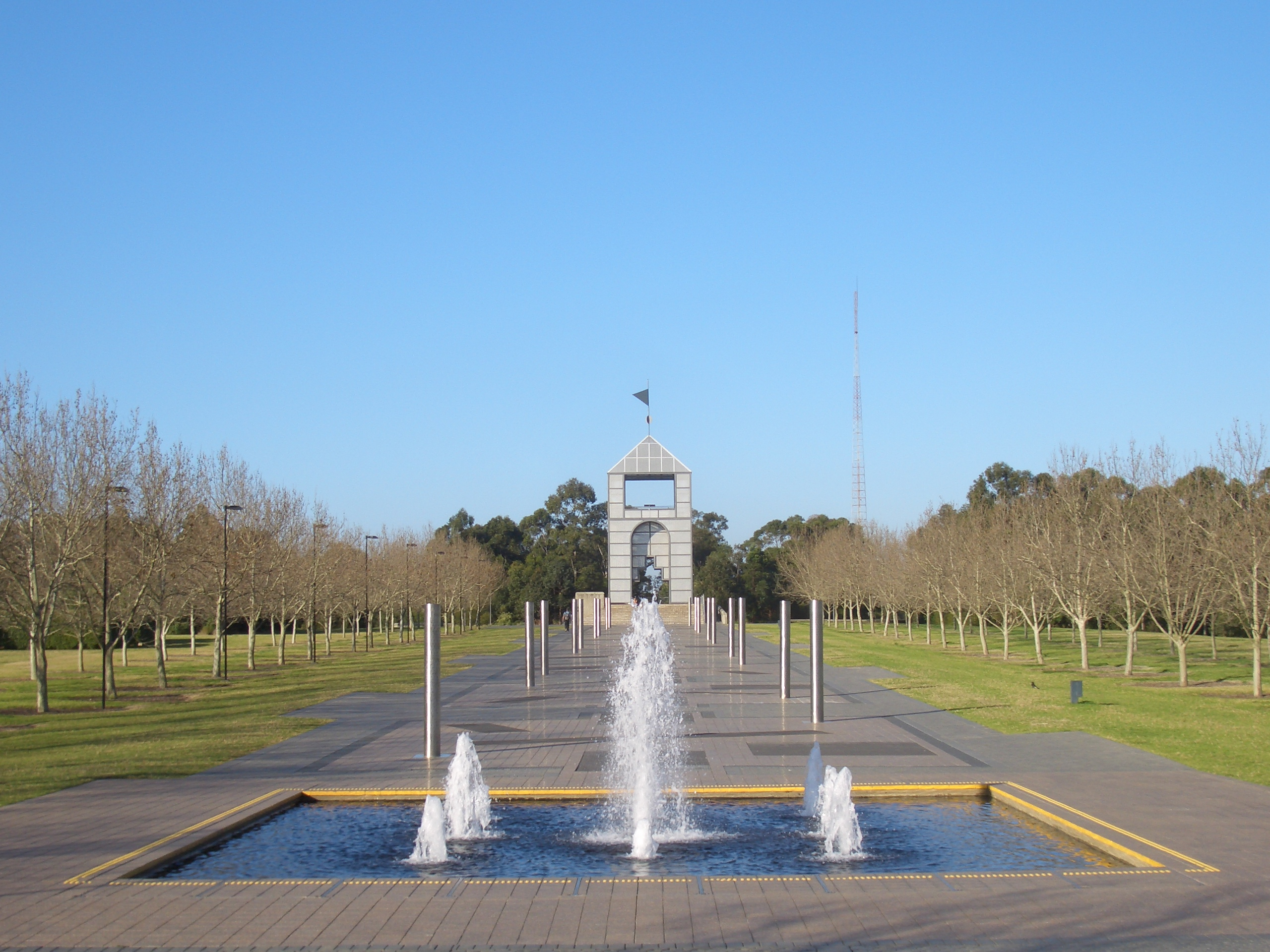
Bicentennial Park

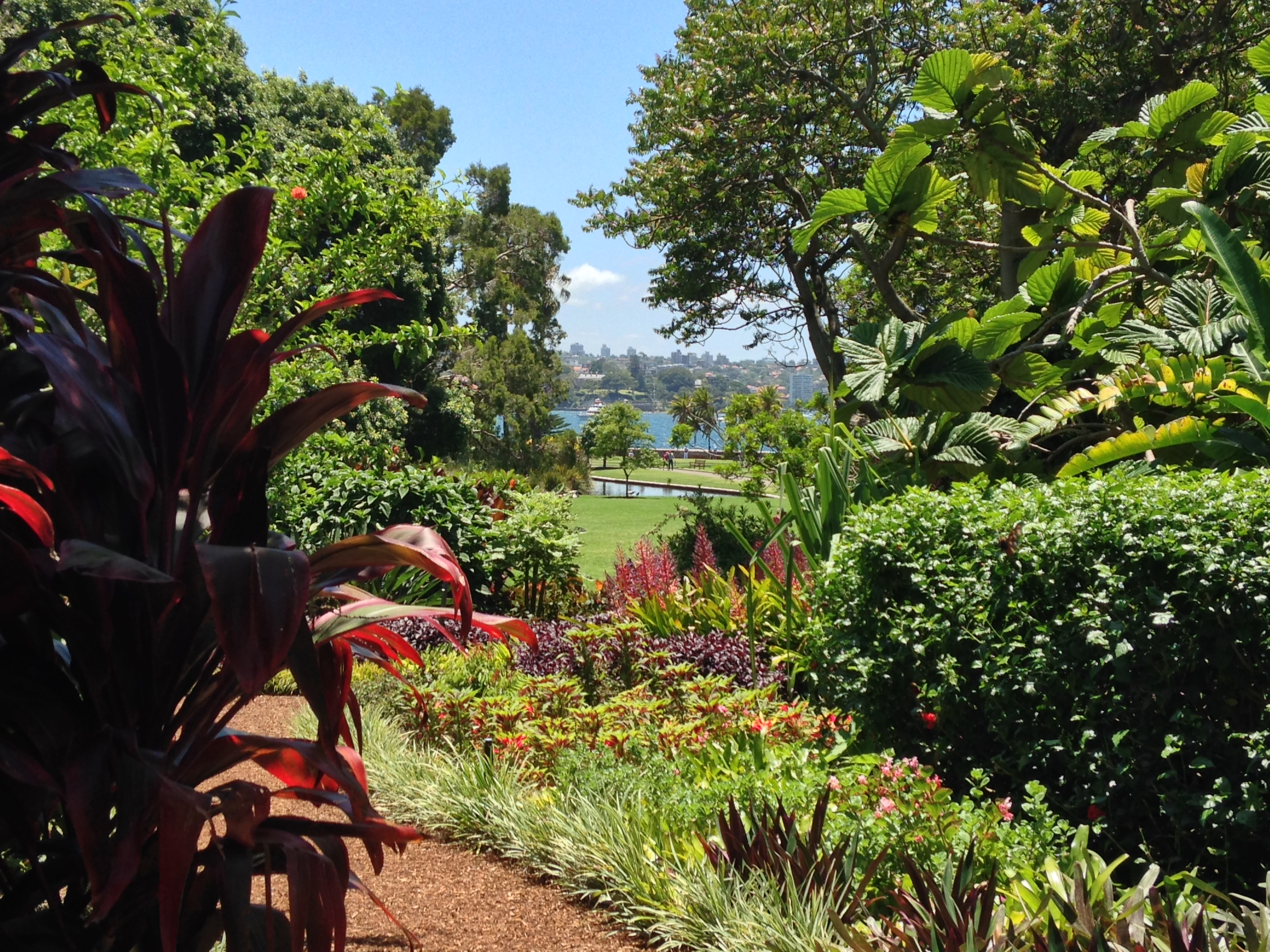
The Royal Botanic Garden

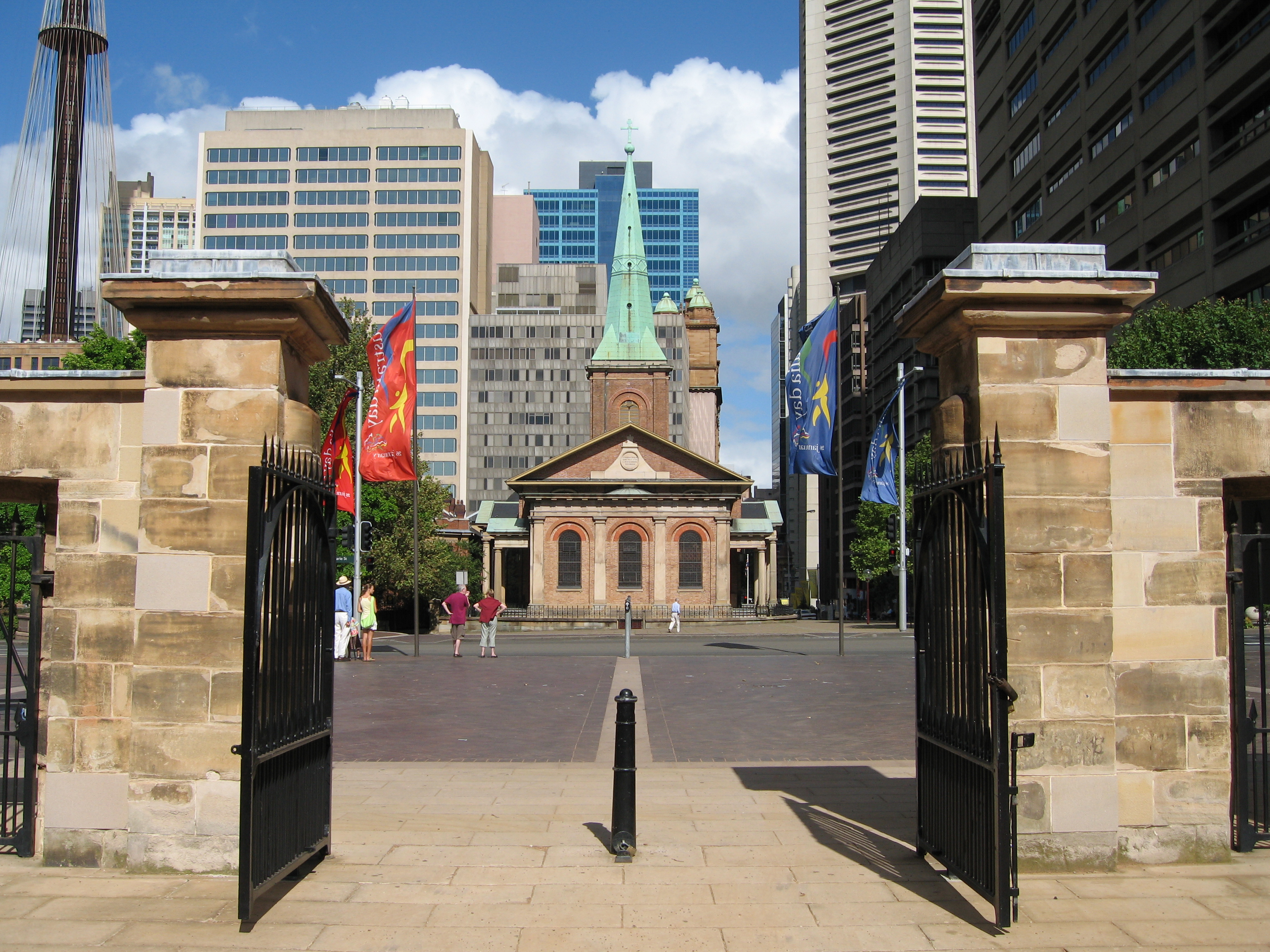
View across Queen's Square

Parks in Sydney

- Auburn Botanical Gardens
- Belmore Park
- Bicentennial Park
- Brenan Park
- Centennial Parklands
- Central Gardens Nature Reserve
- Chinese Garden of Friendship
- Hyde Park
- Luna Park Sydney
- Macquarie Place Park
- Moore Park
- Observatory Park
- Royal Botanic Garden
- Sydney Park
- Taronga Zoo
- The Domain
- Tumbalong Park
- Wild Life Sydney
- Wynyard Park

==== Public squares in Sydney ====
- Queen's Square
- Railway Square
- Whitlam Square

==== Religious buildings in Sydney ====
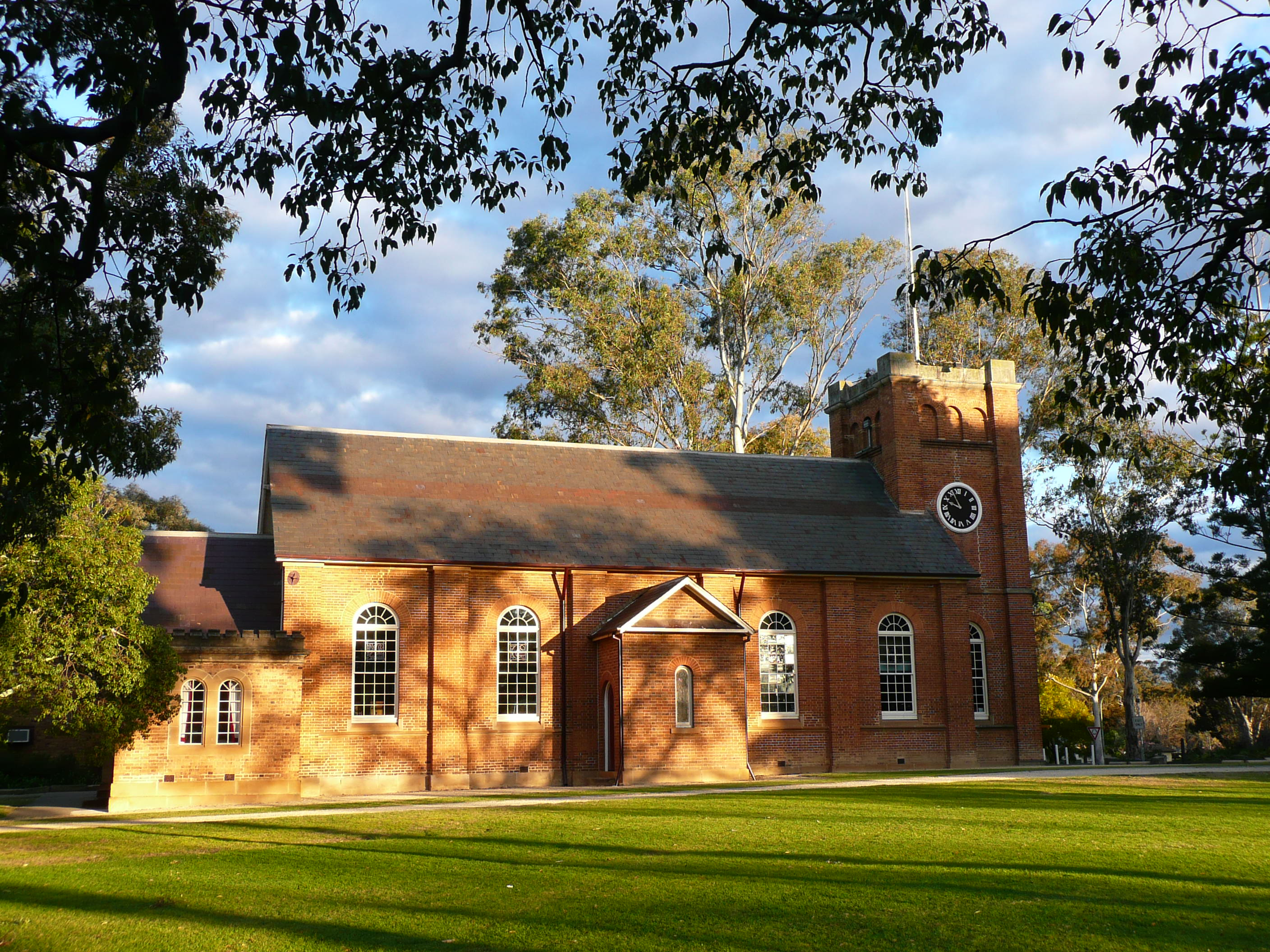
St Peter's Church in Campbelltown

- Christ Church St Laurence
- Hunter Baillie Memorial Presbyterian Church
- St Andrew's Cathedral
- St James' Church
- St. Maron's Cathedral
- St Mary's Cathedral
- St Philip's Church
- St John's Cathedral, Parramatta
- St Patrick's Cathedral, Parramatta
- Greek Orthodox Cathedral of St Sophia
- Great Synagogue
- Lakemba Mosque
- Sydney Baháʼí Temple
- St Patrick's Seminary, Manly
- Sacred Heart Monastery, Kensington

==== Secular buildings in Sydney ====
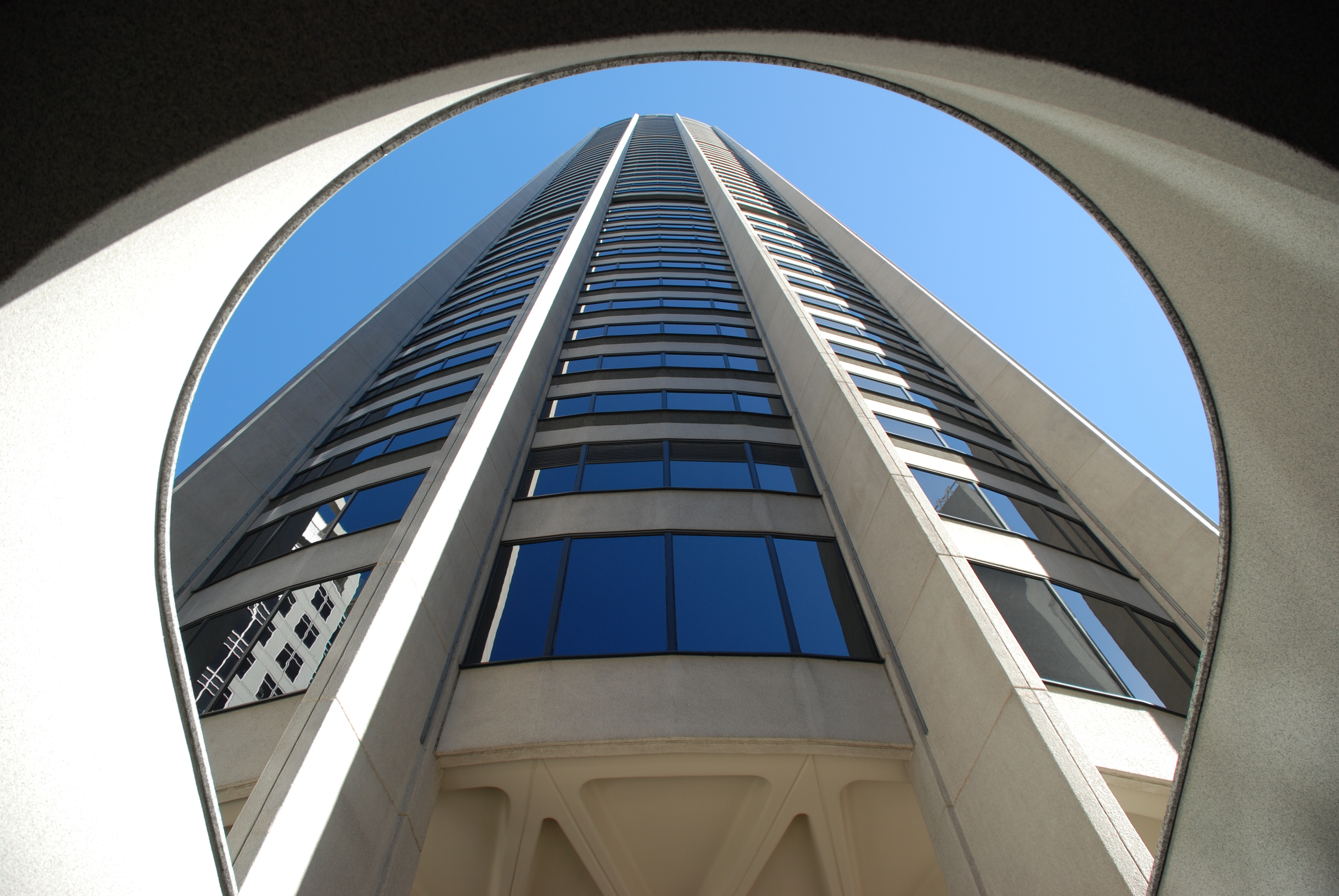
Australia Square tower

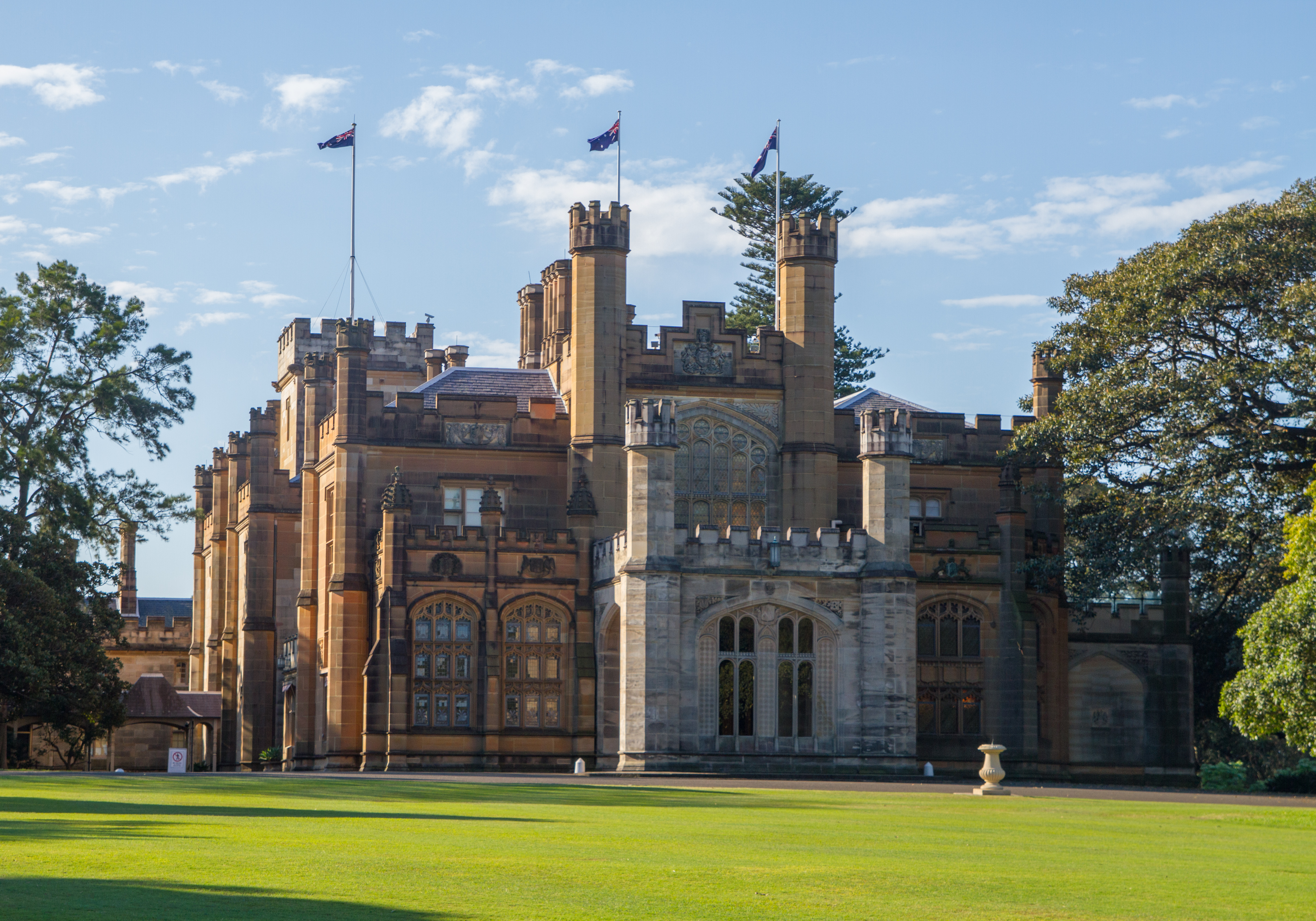
Government House

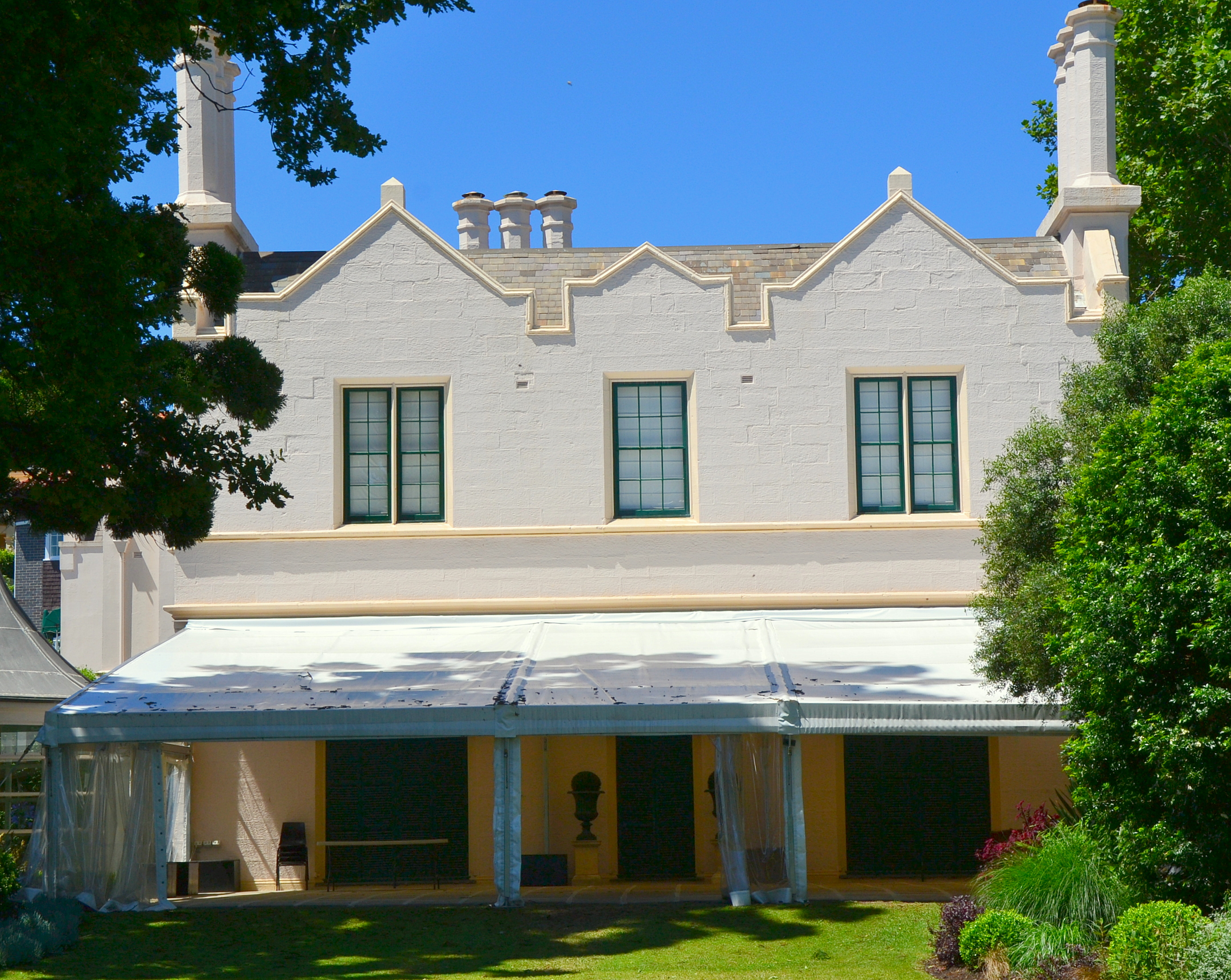
Lindesay in Darling Point

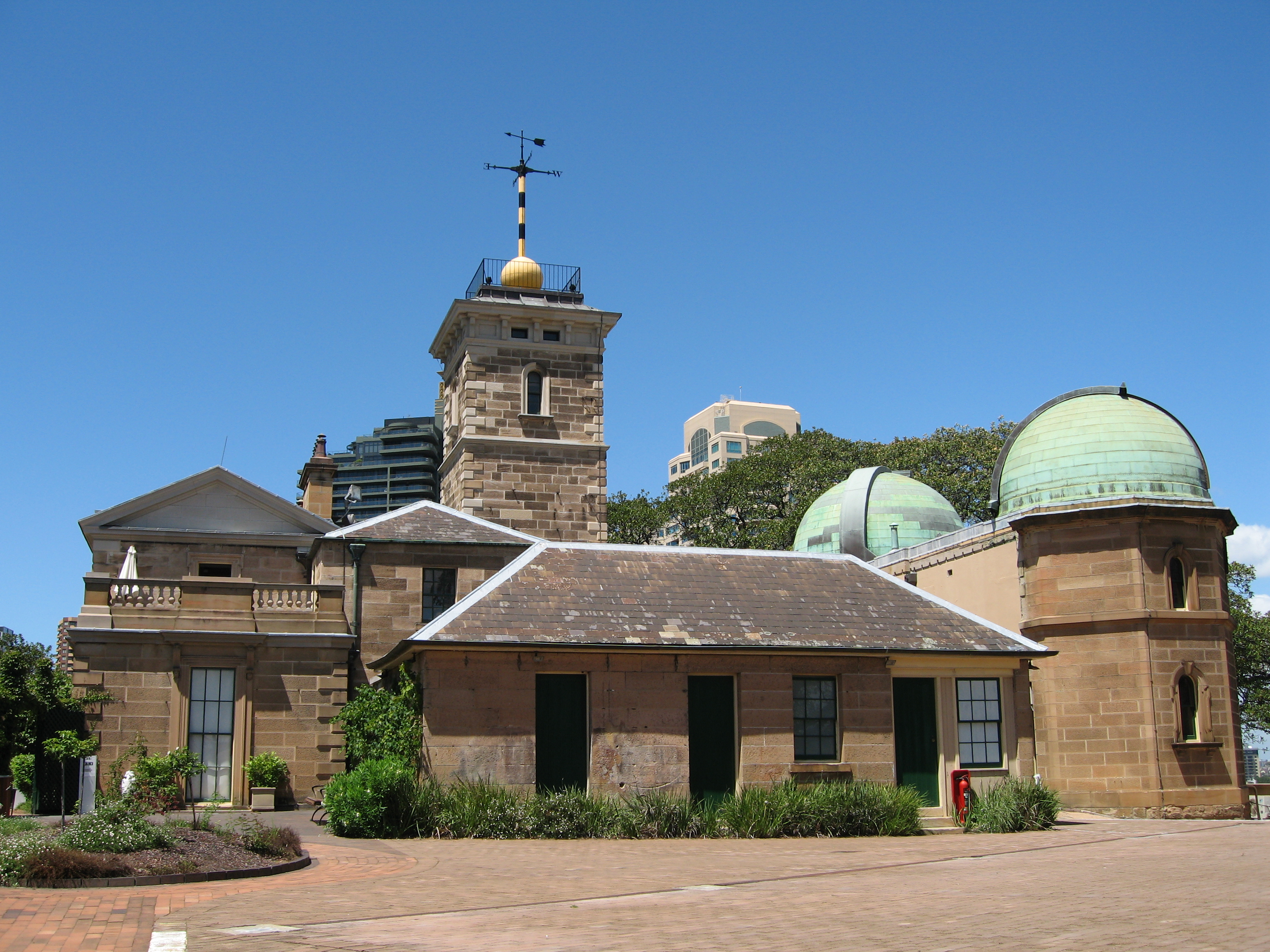
Sydney Observatory

- 1 Bligh Street
- 25 Martin Place
- Admiralty House
- Australia Square
- AWA Tower
- Bellevue
- Bennelong Apartments
- Boronia House
- Carthona, Darling Point
- Cloncorrick
- Customs House
- Deutsche Bank Place
- General Post Office
- Government House
- Grace Building
- Hordern Pavilion
- Horizon Apartments
- Hyde Park Barracks
- International Towers Sydney
- Lindesay, Darling Point
- Parliament House
- Quay Quarter Tower
- Queen Victoria Building
- The Star
- Sydney Mint
- Sydney Observatory
- Sydney Town Hall
- Treasury Building
- Victoria Barracks
- Vaucluse House
- Zenith Centre

==== Streets in Sydney ====
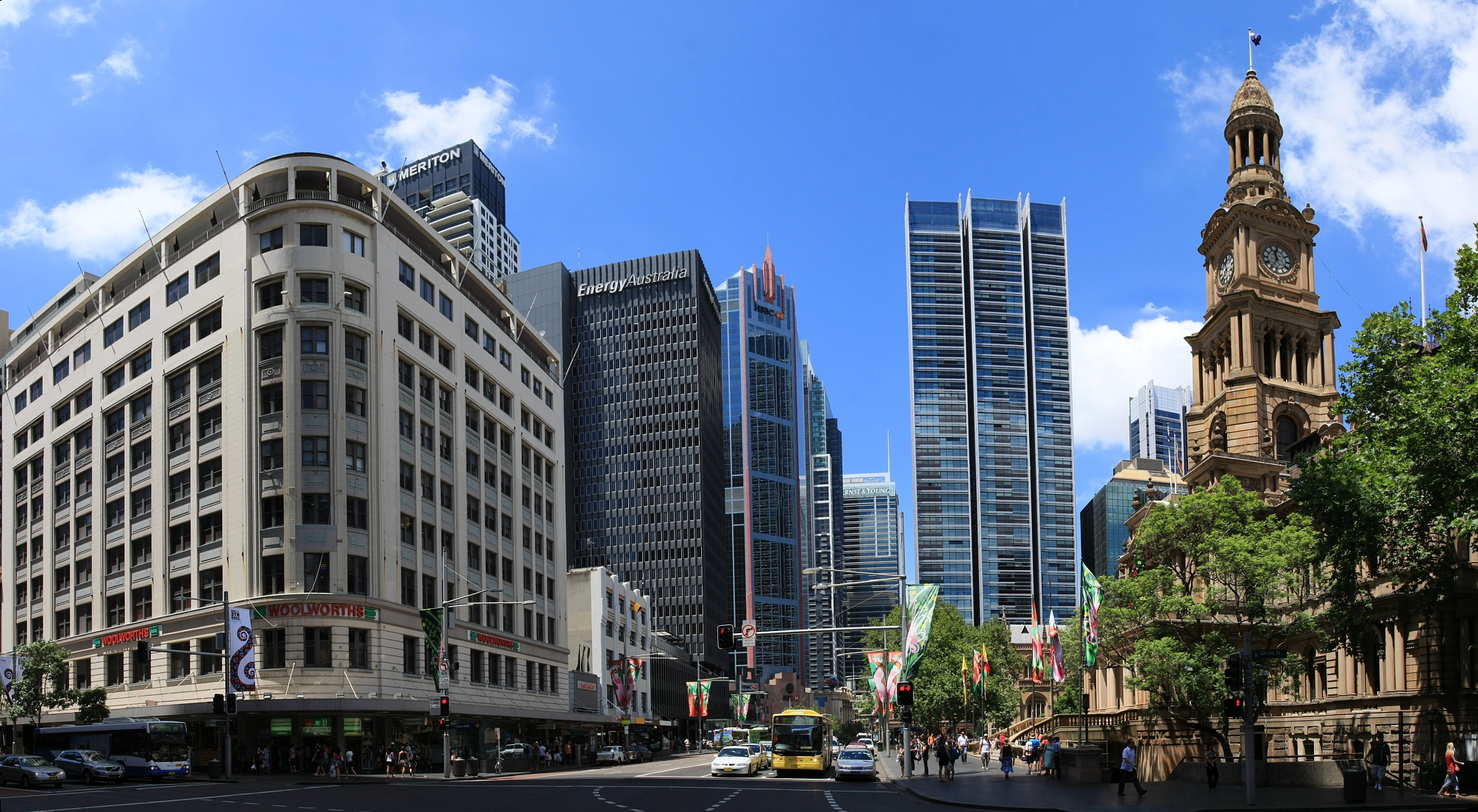
George Street

- Broadway
- Cumberland Highway
- George Street
- Elizabeth Street
- Great Western Highway
- Hume Highway
- Liverpool Street
- Macquarie Street
- Oxford Street
- Parramatta Road
- Pitt Street
- Sydney Orbital Network
- Victoria Road

==== Theatres in Sydney ====
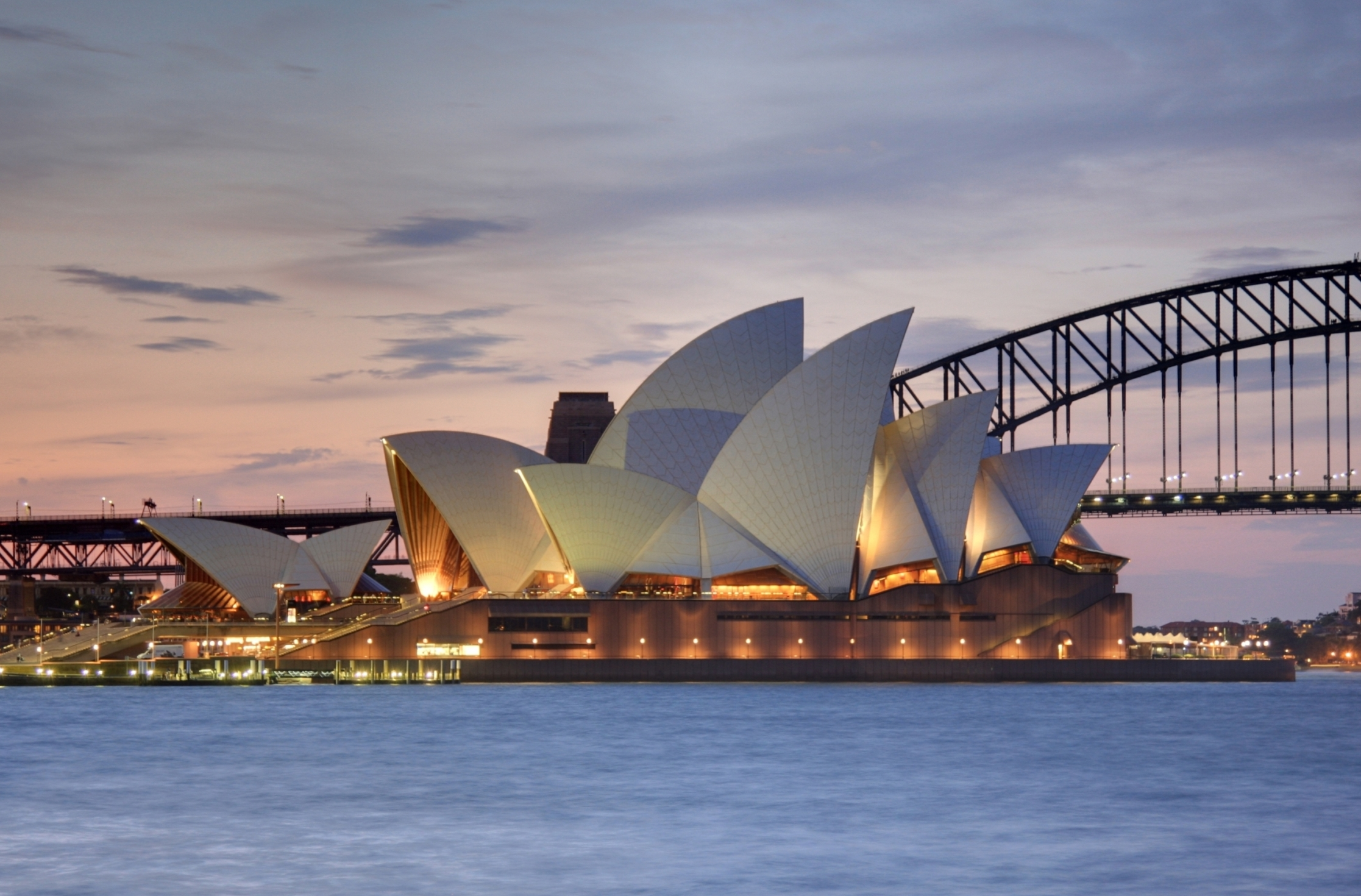
Sydney Opera House

- Capitol Theatre
- Enmore Theatre
- Roslyn Packer Theatre
- State Theatre
- Sydney Opera House
- Theatre Royal
- Wharf Theatre

==== Towers in Sydney ====
- Sydney Tower

=== Demographics of Sydney ===
Demographics of Sydney

== Government and politics of Sydney ==
Government and politics of Sydney

- Division of Sydney
- Mayors, lord mayors and administrators of Sydney
- International relations of Sydney
  - San Francisco, California, United States (1968)

=== Law and order in Sydney ===
- Crime in Sydney
  - Sydney lockout laws

== History of Sydney ==
History of Sydney

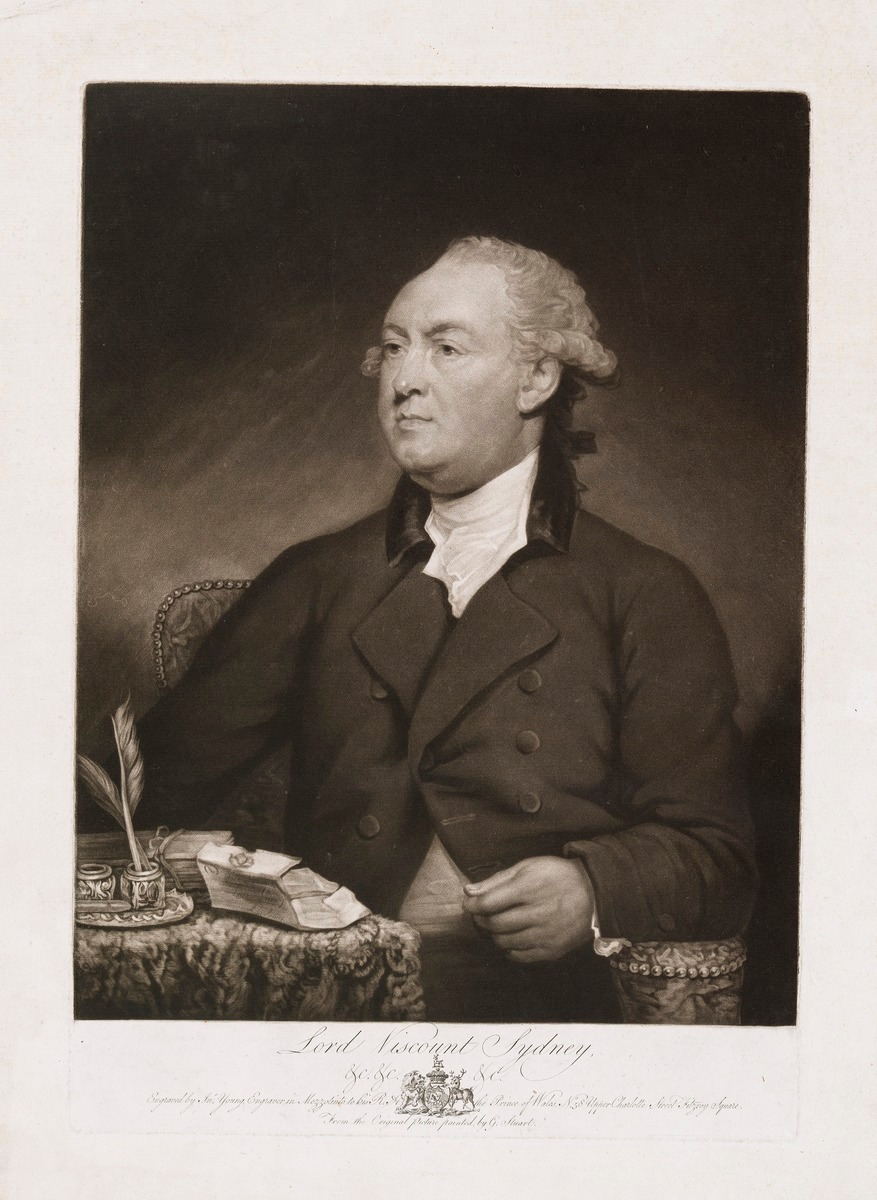
Thomas Townshend, 1st Viscount Sydney. The city was named in his honour in 1788

=== History of Sydney, by period or event ===
Timeline of Sydney

- Early history
- Sydney during the 18th and the 19th century
  - The crew of HMS Endeavour under the command of James Cook sights the east coast of Australia (1770)
  - The British colony of New South Wales is subsequently established with the arrival of the First Fleet under the command of Captain Arthur Phillip (1788)
  - The colony is named "Sydney", after the British Home Secretary, Thomas Townshend, 1st Viscount Sydney (1788)
  - Hawkesbury and Nepean Wars (1790–1816)
  - List of governors of New South Wales
- Sydney during the 20th century
  - Sydney becomes the capital of the Australian state of New South Wales (1901)
  - Sydney during the World War II (1939–1945)
  - Post-war Sydney
  - Sydney in the new millennium

== Culture of Sydney ==
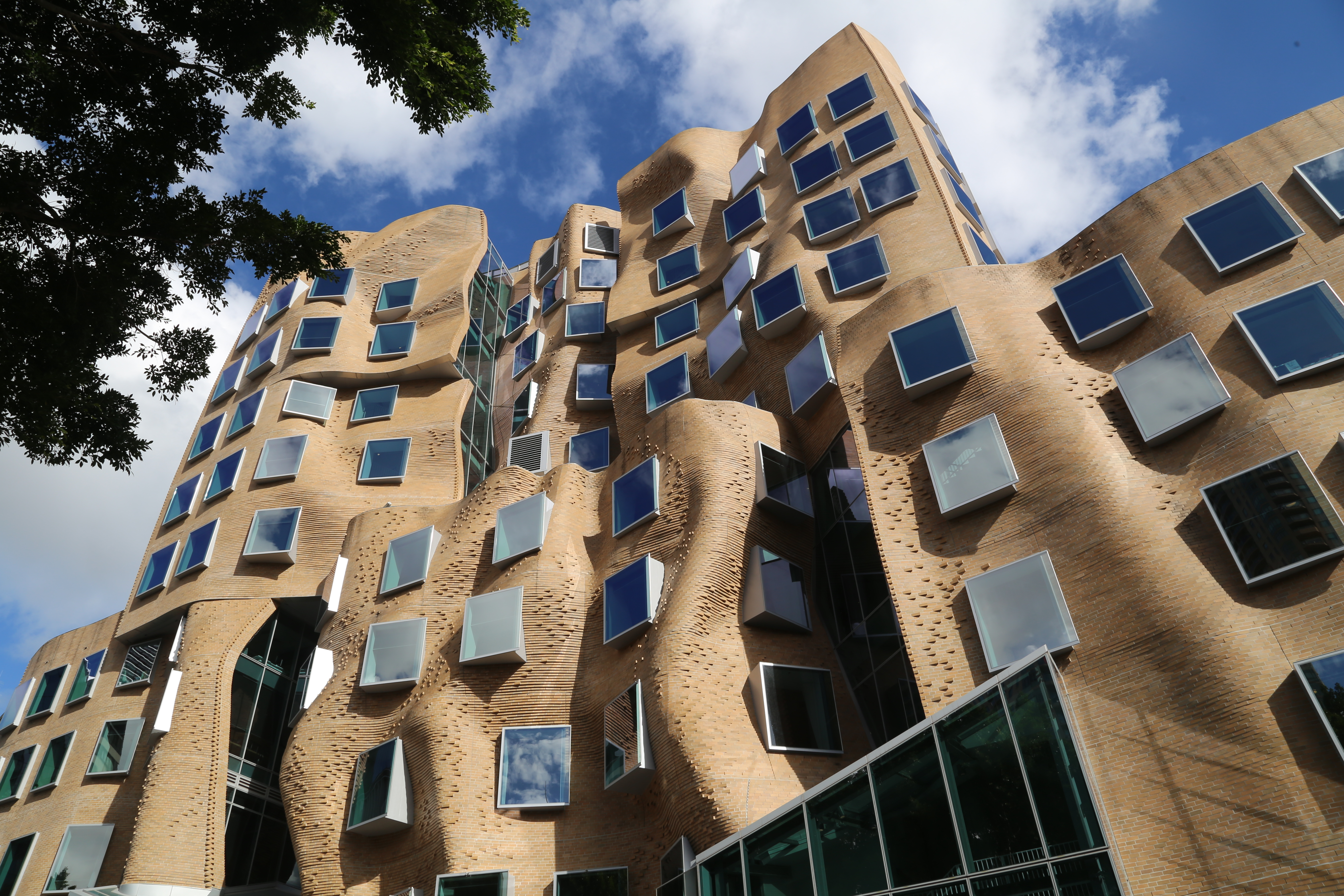
The Business School building at the UTS, a Sydney architectural landmark

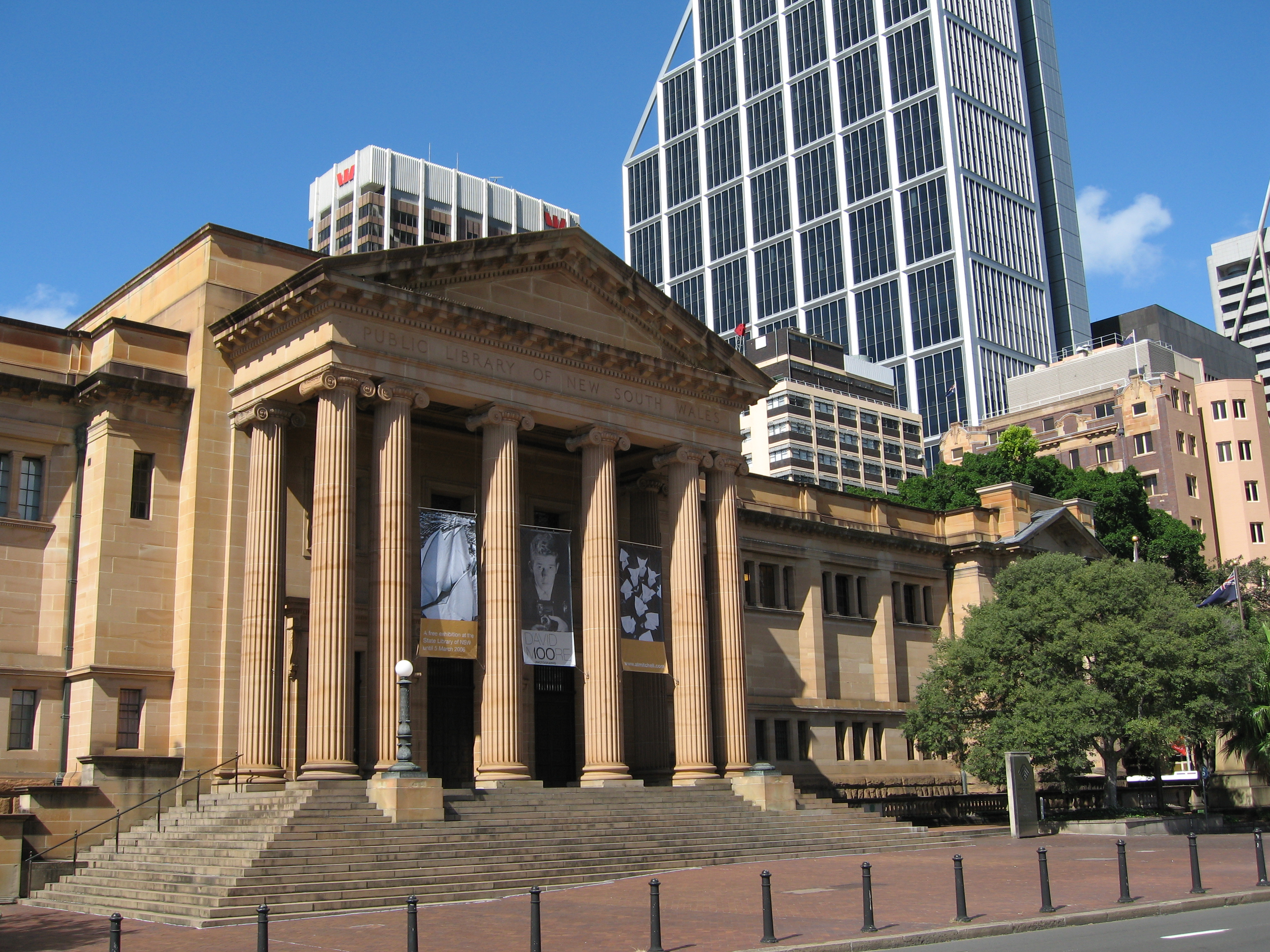
The State Library of New South Wales in the Neoclassical style

Culture of Sydney

=== Arts in Sydney ===
==== Architecture of Sydney ====
Architecture of Sydney

- Art Deco buildings in Sydney
- Heritage houses in Sydney
- Tallest buildings in Sydney

==== Cinema of Sydney ====
Cinema of Sydney

- Fox Studios Australia
- Sydney Film Festival

==== Literature of Sydney ====
Literature of Sydney

- Sydney Writers' Festival

==== Music and ballet of Sydney ====
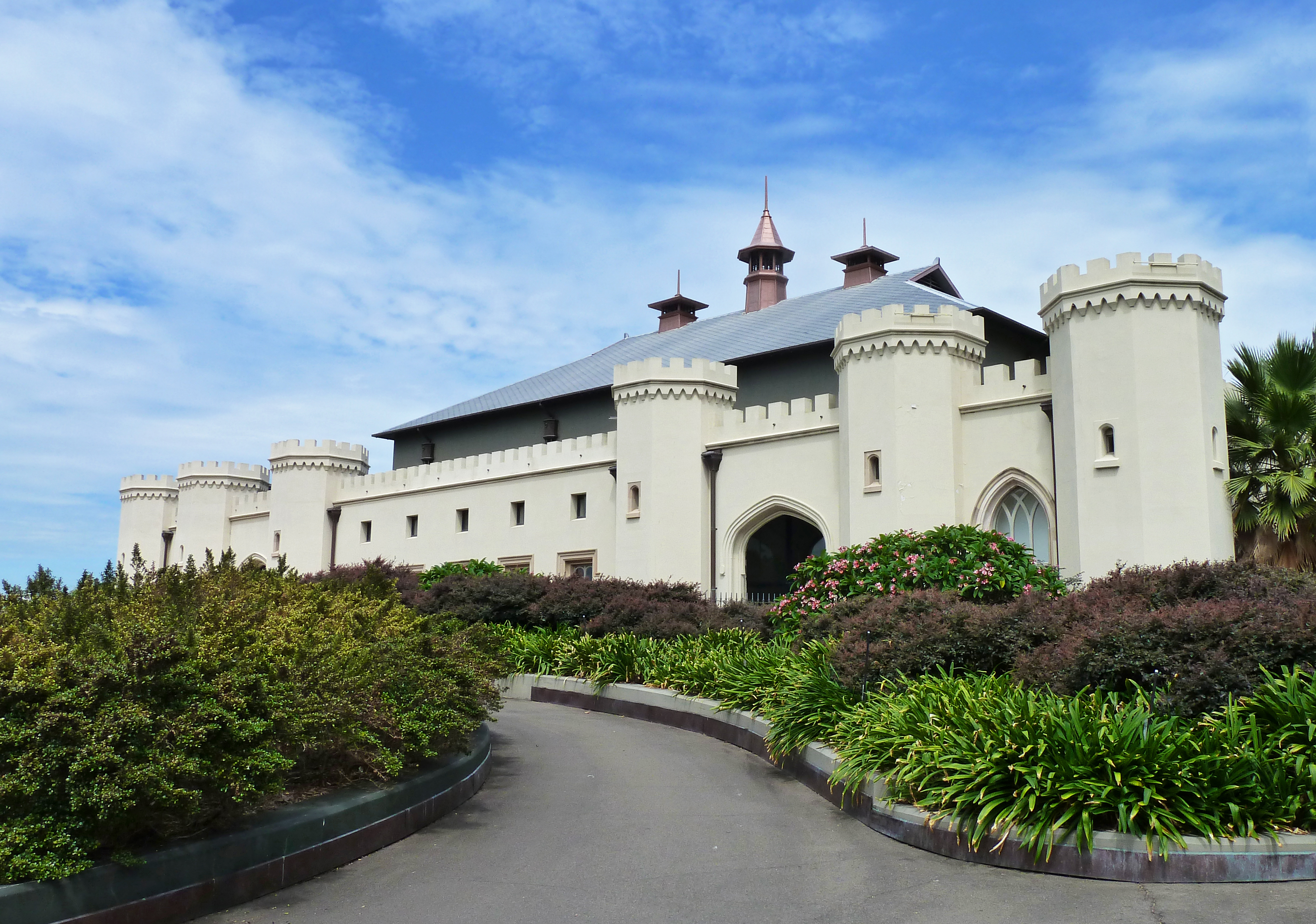
Sydney Conservatorium of Music

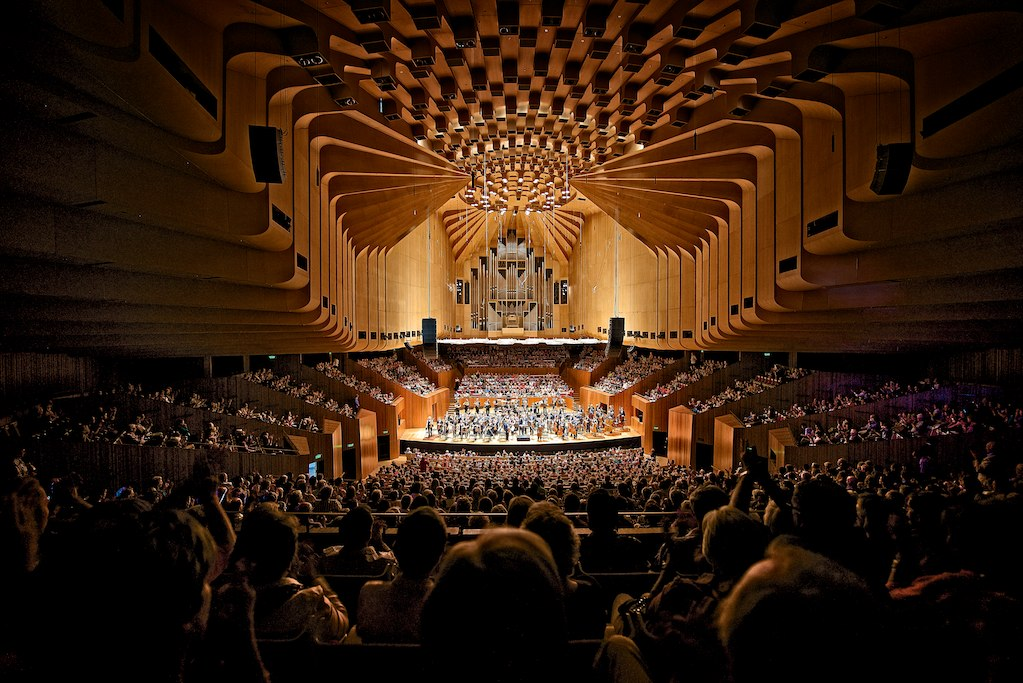
The auditorium of Sydney Opera House

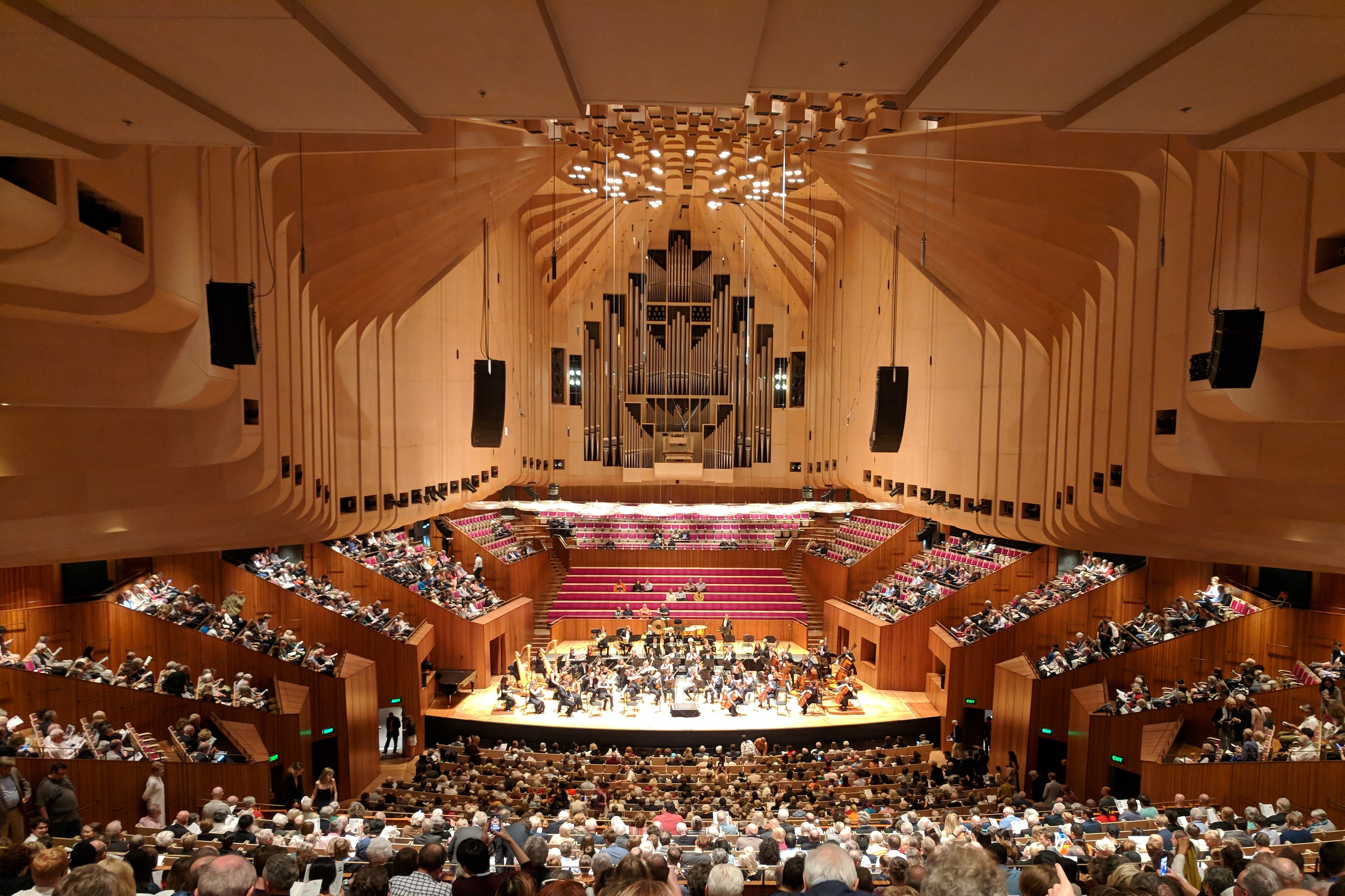
The Sydney Symphony Orchestra in the Concert Hall of the Sydney Opera House

Music of Sydney

- Ballet of Sydney
  - Sydney Dance Company
- Music festivals and competitions in Sydney
  - Sydney International Piano Competition
- Music schools in Sydney
  - Sydney Conservatorium of Music
- Music venues in Sydney
  - City Recital Hall
  - Sydney Lyric
  - Sydney Opera House
- Musical ensembles in Sydney
  - Australian Brandenburg Orchestra
  - Australian Chamber Orchestra
  - Harbour City Opera
  - Opera Australia
    - Opera Australia Orchestra
  - St Mary's Cathedral Choir
  - Sydney Chamber Choir
  - Sydney Chamber Opera
  - Sydney Philharmonia Choirs
  - Sydney Symphony Orchestra
  - Sydney University Symphony Orchestra
- Musicians from Sydney
  - Jonathan Mills
- Songs about Sydney

==== Theatre of Sydney ====
- Bell Shakespeare
- Sydney Theatre Company

==== Visual arts of Sydney ====
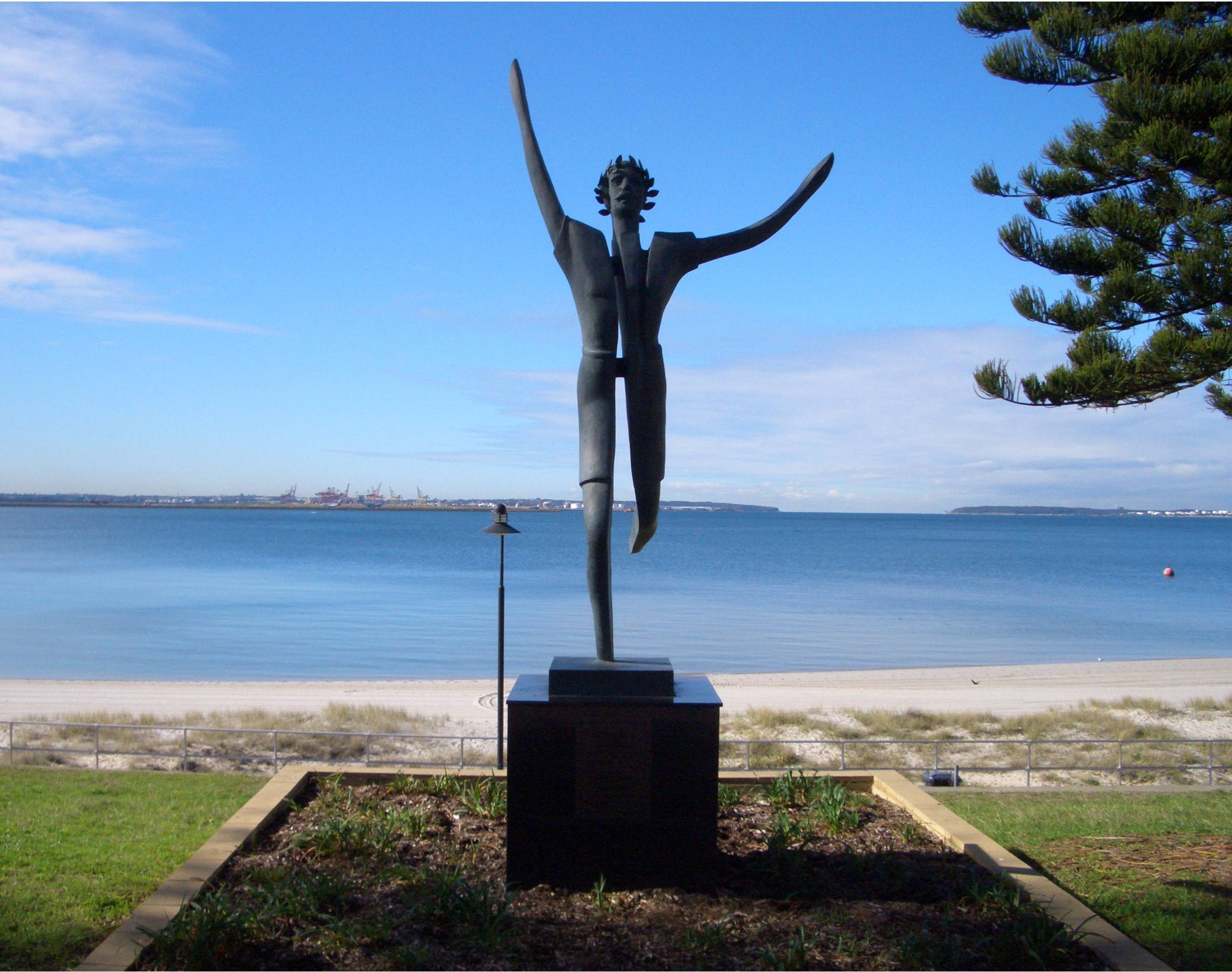
The Olympic statue on the Grand Parade in Brighton-Le-Sands

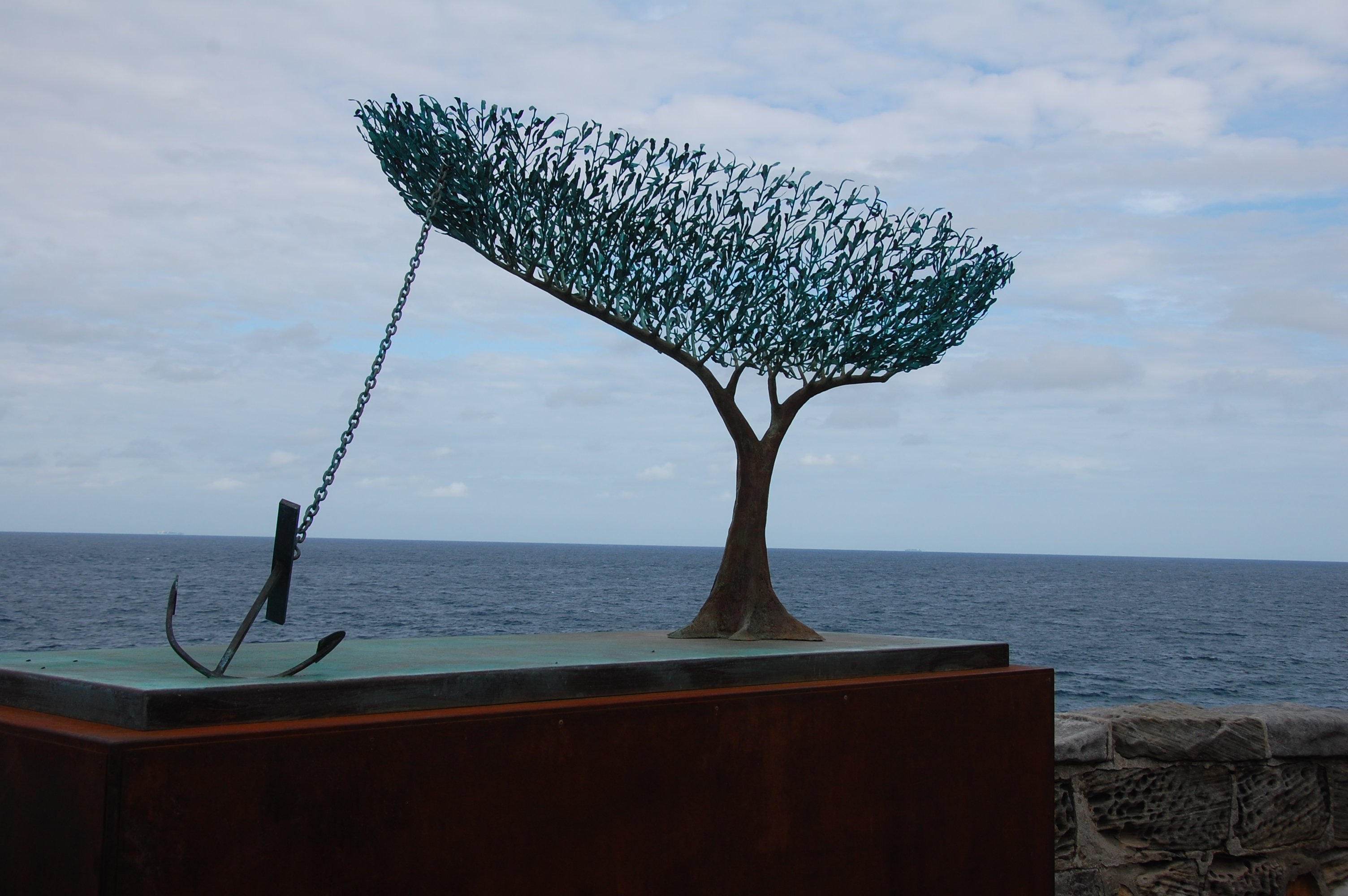
Nexus by Alex Kosmas, Sculpture by the Sea, 2008

- Sydney rock engravings

Public art in the City of Sydney

- Cloud Arch
- Forgotten Songs
- Halo

Events in Sydney

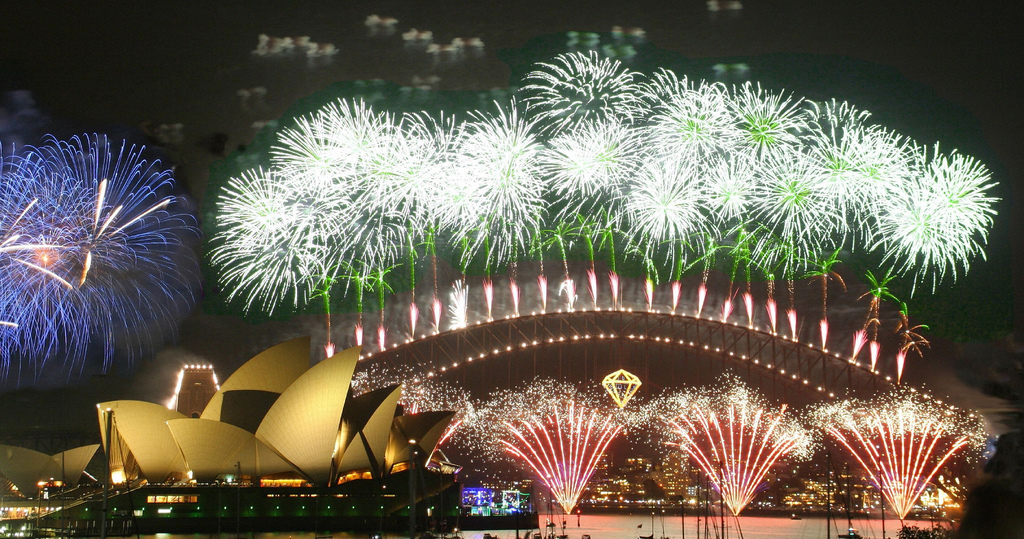
Sydney New Year's Eve

- Australian Fashion Week
- Australian International Motor Show
- Sculpture by the Sea
- Sydney New Year's Eve
- Sydney Royal Easter Show
- Sydney to Hobart Yacht Race

Festivals in Sydney

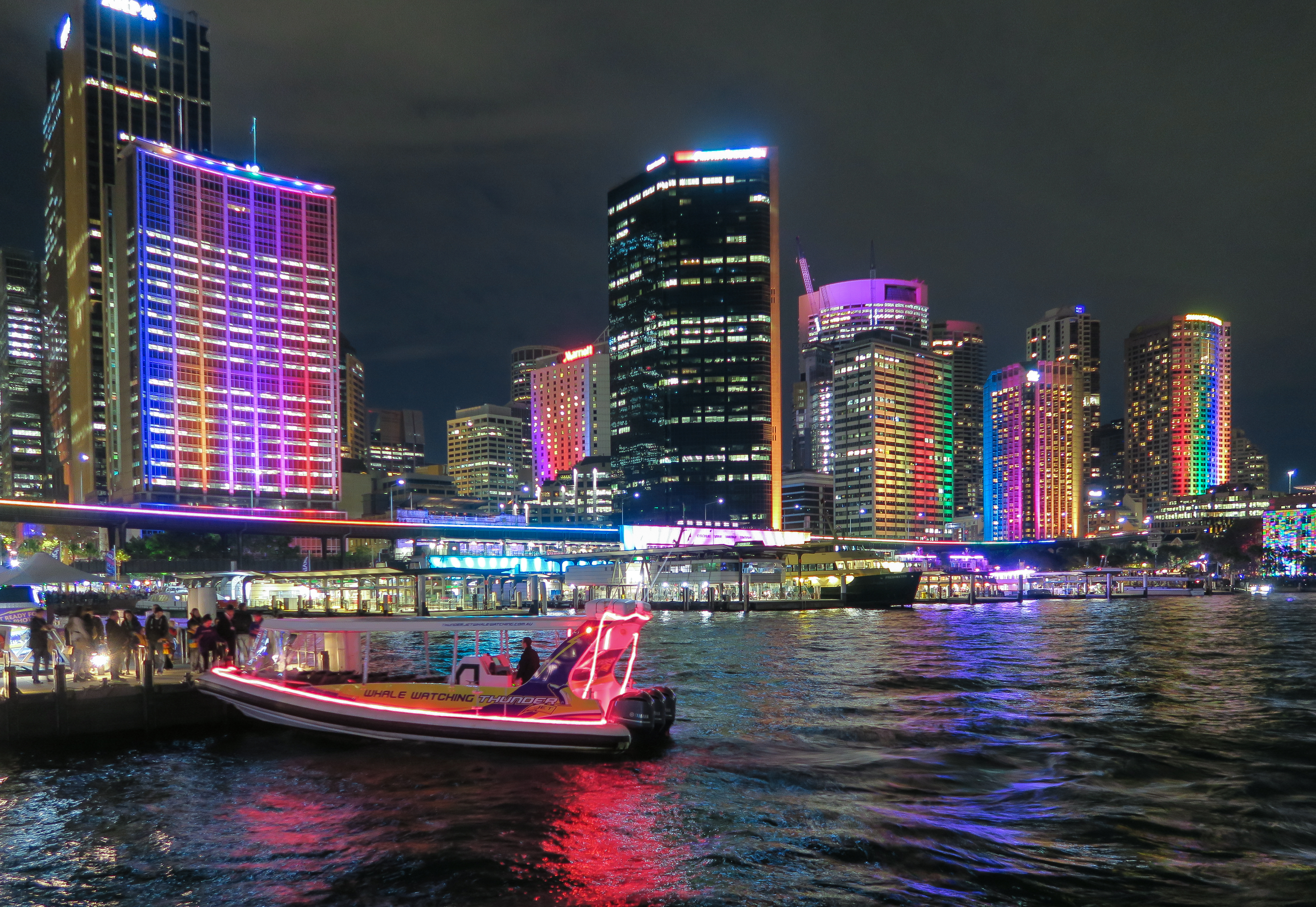
The Sydney skyline during Vivid Sydney lighting festival

- Biennale of Sydney
- Big Day Out
- Sydney Festival
- The Great Escape
- Vivid Sydney

Languages of Sydney

Languages of Sydney

- Australian English
- Dharug language

Media in Sydney

- Newspapers in Sydney
  - The Daily Telegraph
  - Sydney Morning Herald
- Radio and television in Sydney
  - Australian Broadcasting Corporation

People from Sydney

- Michael Mobbs

=== Religion in Sydney ===
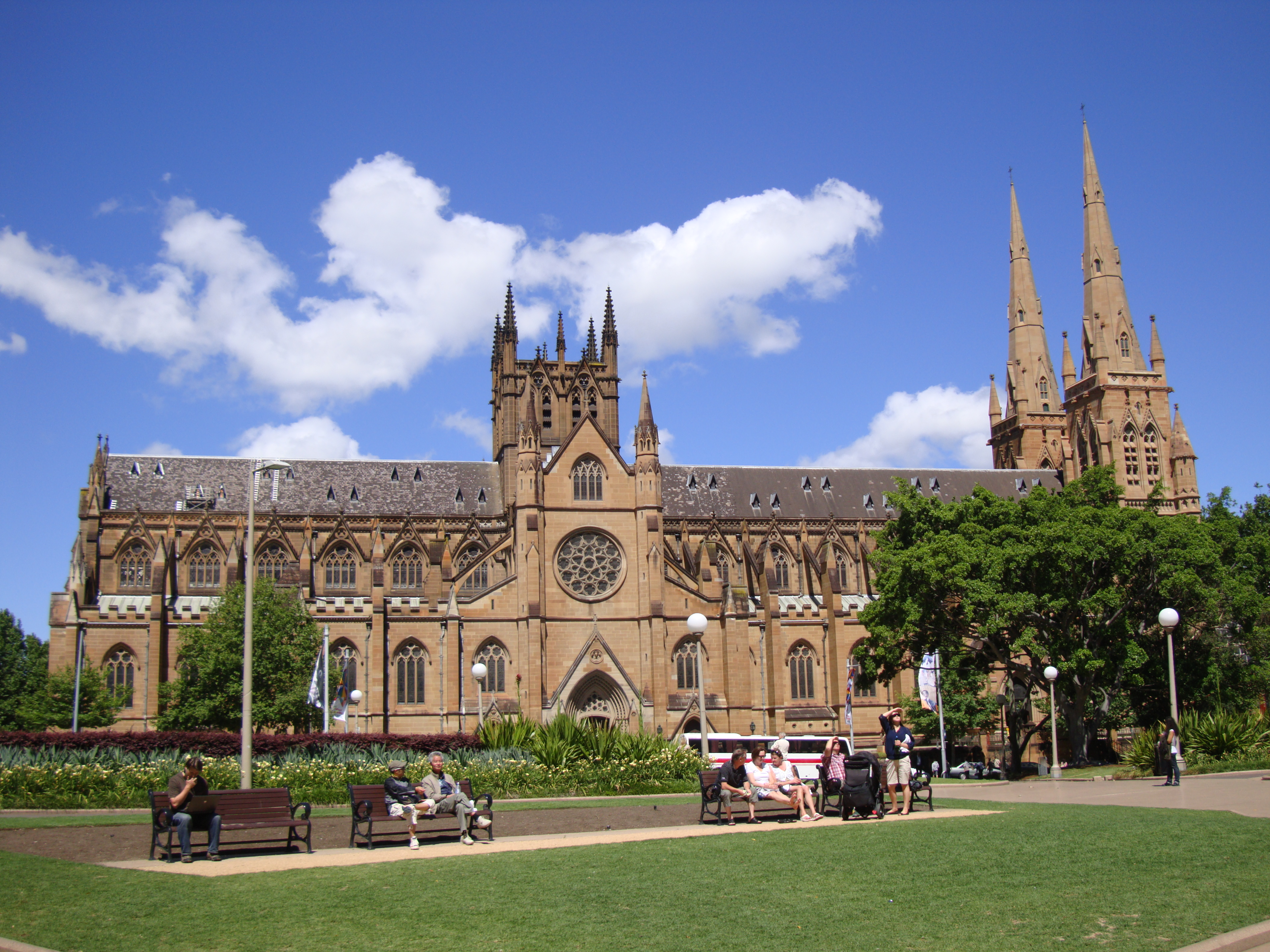
St Mary's Cathedral

Religion in Sydney

- Catholicism in Sydney
  - Roman Catholic Archdiocese of Sydney
    - Catholic Bishops and Archbishops of Sydney
    - St Mary's Cathedral
  - Roman Catholic Diocese of Parramatta

=== Sports in Sydney ===
Sport in Sydney

- Basketball in Sydney
  - Sydney Kings
- Cricket in Sydney
  - New South Wales cricket team

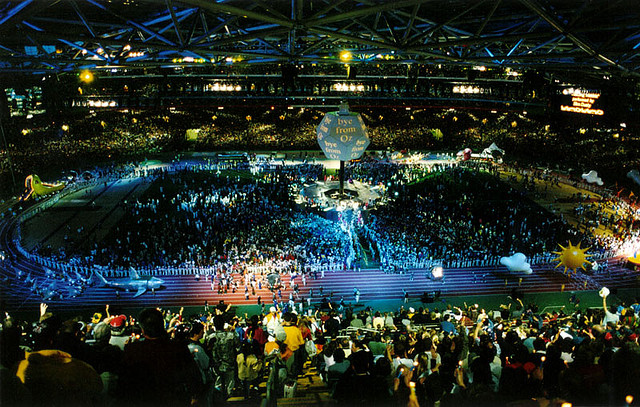
Closing ceremony of the 2000 Summer Olympics at Stadium Australia

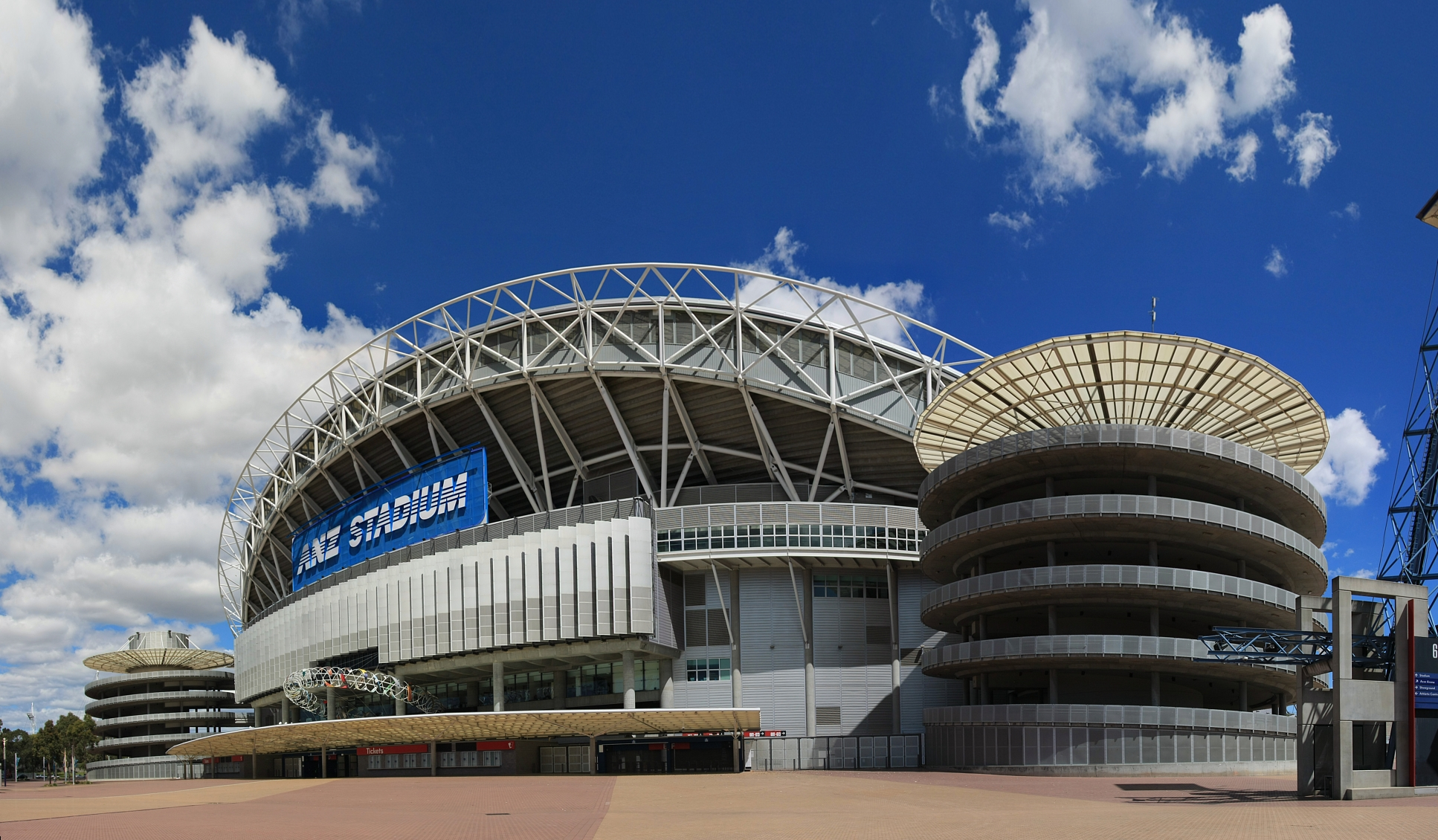
Stadium Australia

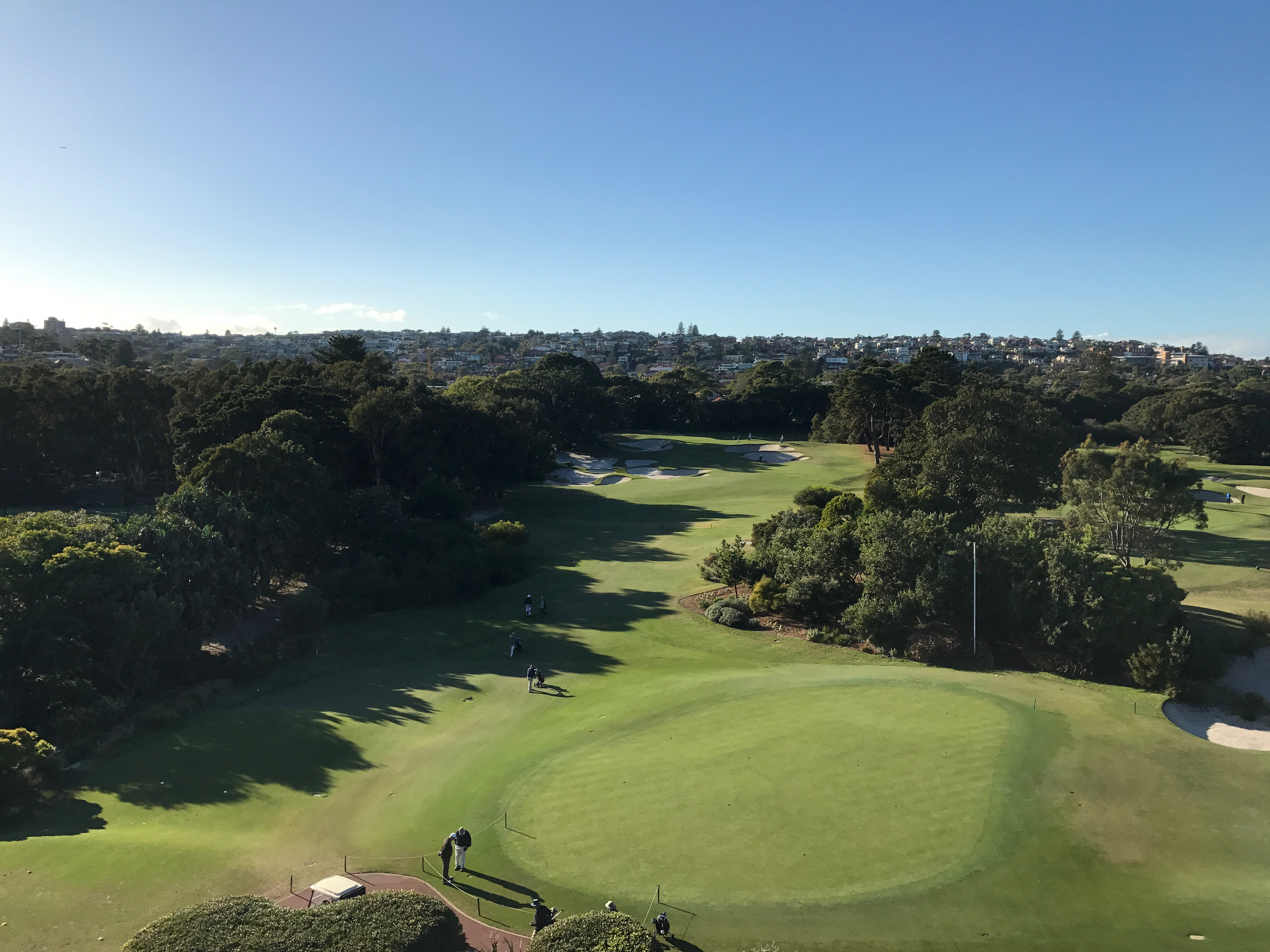
Royal Sydney Golf Club Championship Course

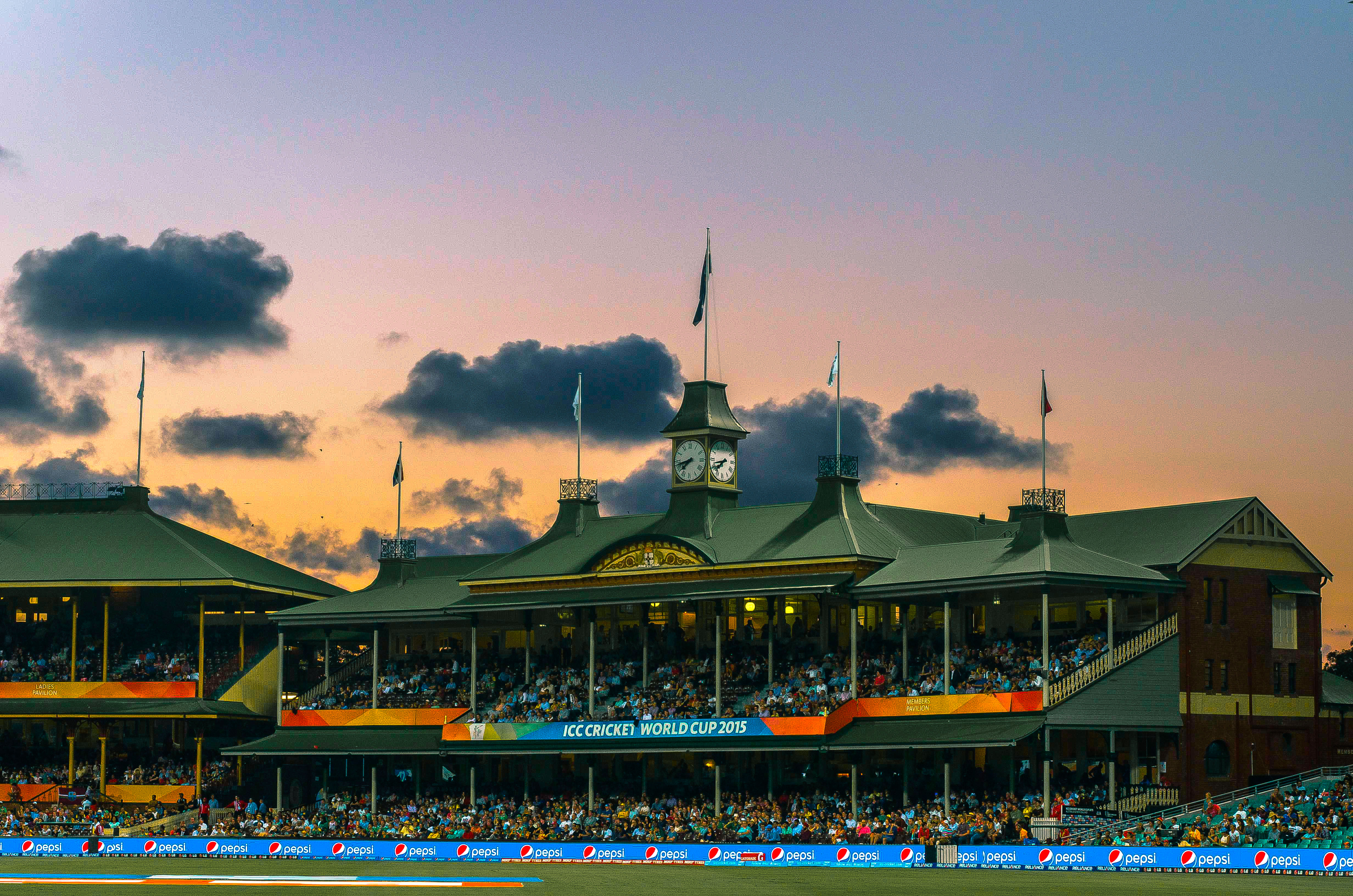
Sydney Cricket Ground, the Member's Pavilion

- Football in Sydney
  - Association football in Sydney
    - Sydney Derby (A-League)
      - Sydney FC
      - Western Sydney Wanderers FC
  - Australian rules football in Sydney
    - Sydney Derby (AFL)
      - Greater Western Sydney Giants
      - Sydney Swans
  - Rugby football in Sydney
    - New South Wales Waratahs
    - Shute Shield
- Olympics in Sydney
  - 2000 Summer Olympics
  - Venues of the 2000 Summer Olympics
- Sports competitions in Sydney
  - Sydney International
  - Sydney Marathon
- Sports venues in Sydney
  - Randwick Racecourse
  - Rosehill Racecourse
  - Royal Sydney Golf Club
  - Sydney Cricket Ground
  - Sydney Football Stadium
  - Sydney Olympic Park
    - NSW Tennis Centre
    - Stadium Australia
    - State Sports Centre
    - Sydney International Aquatic Centre
    - Sydney Olympic Park Athletic Centre
    - Sydney Olympic Park Hockey Centre
    - Sydney Showground Stadium
    - Sydney Super Dome

== Economy and infrastructure of Sydney ==
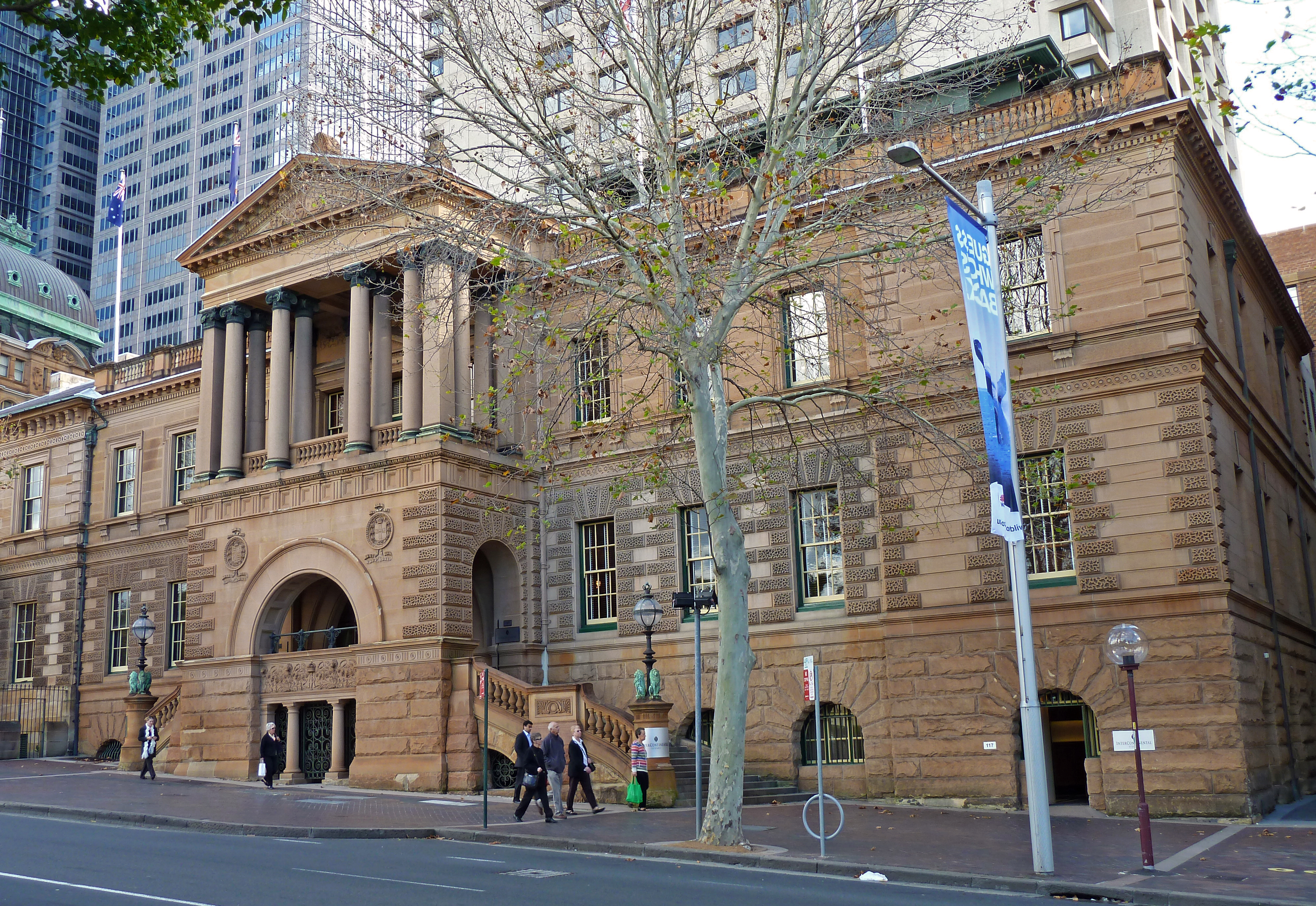
The InterContinental Hotel

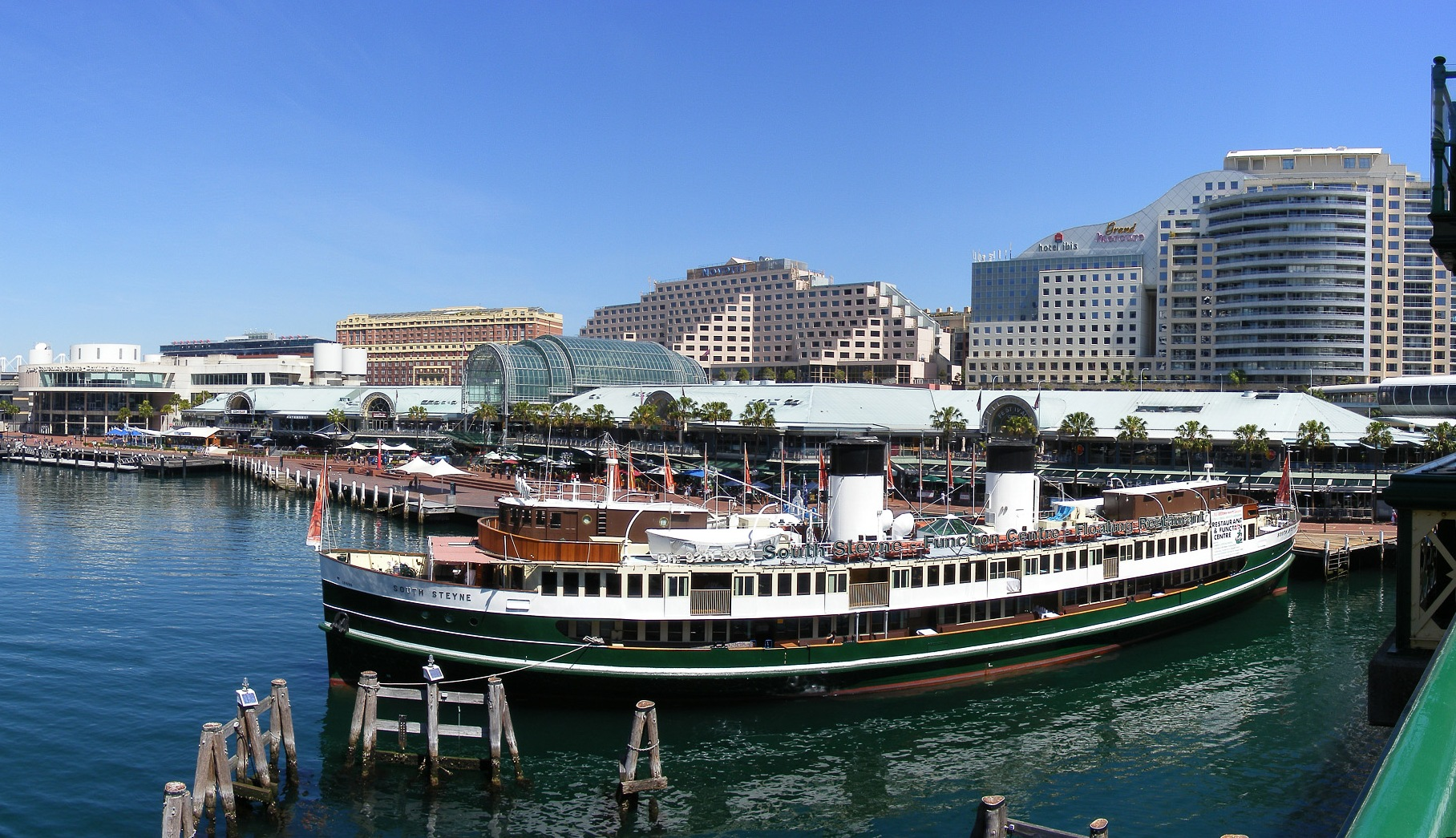
SS South Steyne, a floating restaurant moored at Darling Harbour

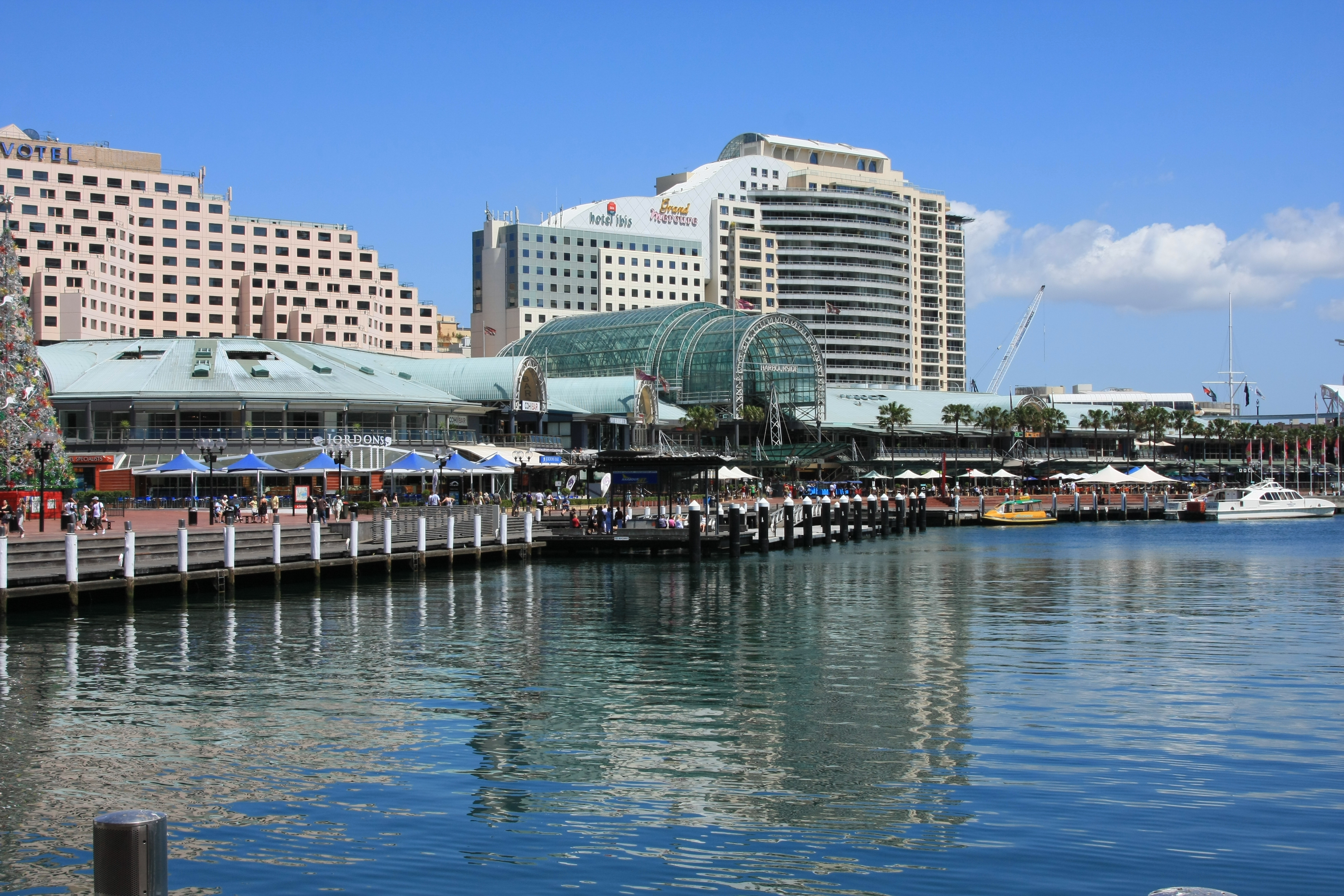
The Harbourside Shopping Centre

Economy of Sydney

- Communications in Sydney
- Financial services in Sydney
  - Australian Securities Exchange
  - Reserve Bank of Australia
- Hotels in Sydney
  - Cremorne Point Manor
  - Crown Sydney
  - The Star
- Restaurants and cafés in Sydney
  - Quay
  - Tetsuya's
- Shopping malls and markets in Sydney
  - Broadway Shopping Centre
  - Chatswood Chase
  - Harbourside Shopping Centre
  - Paddy's Markets
  - Pitt Street Mall
  - Stockland Wetherill Park
  - The Galeries
  - The Strand Arcade
- Tourism in Sydney
  - BridgeClimb Sydney
  - Whale watching in Sydney
  - The Entertainment Quarter

=== Transportation in Sydney ===
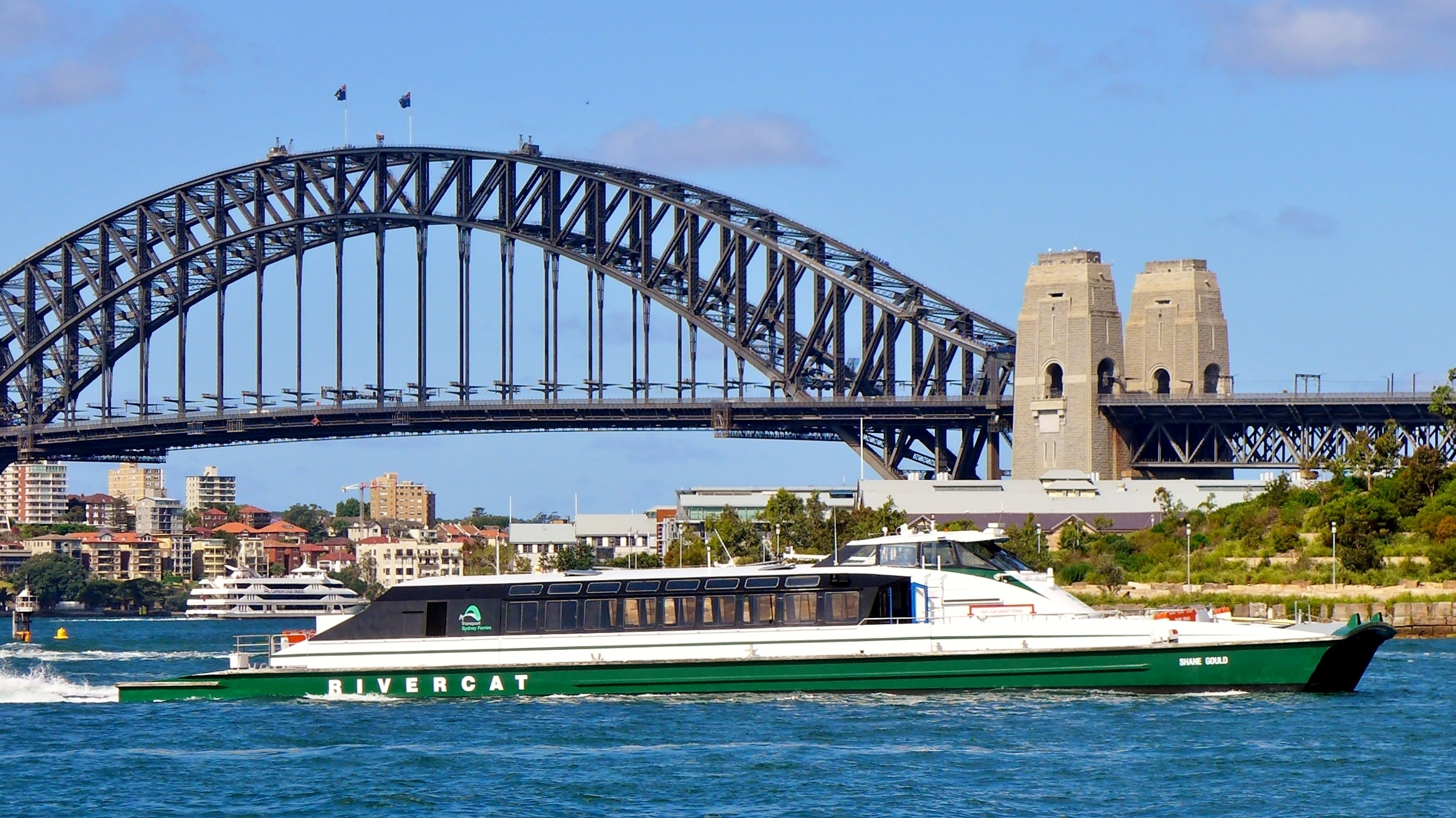
Sydney Ferries' Sydney RiverCat Shane Gould operating an F3 service to Parramatta

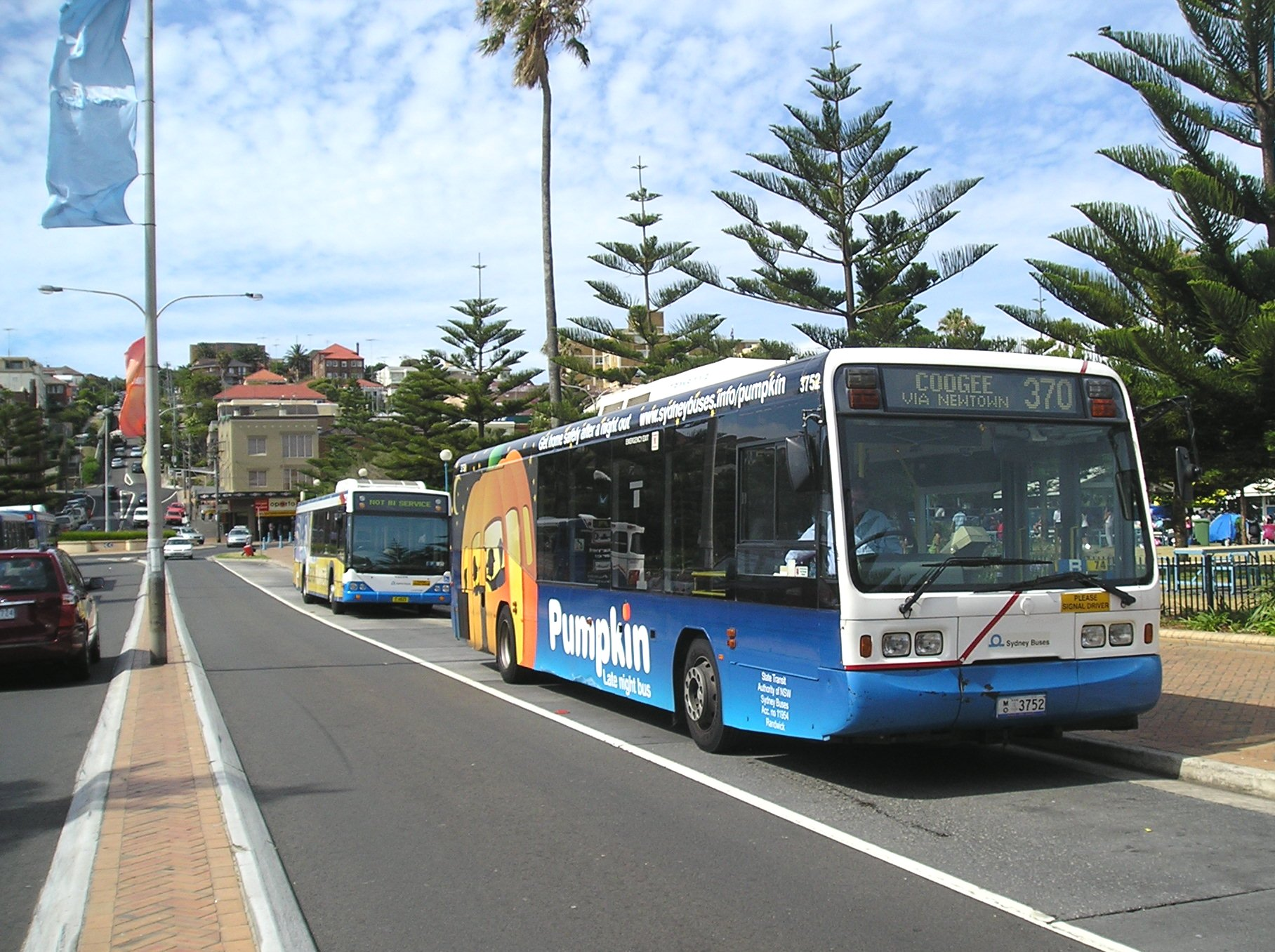
State Transit bus at Coogee Beach

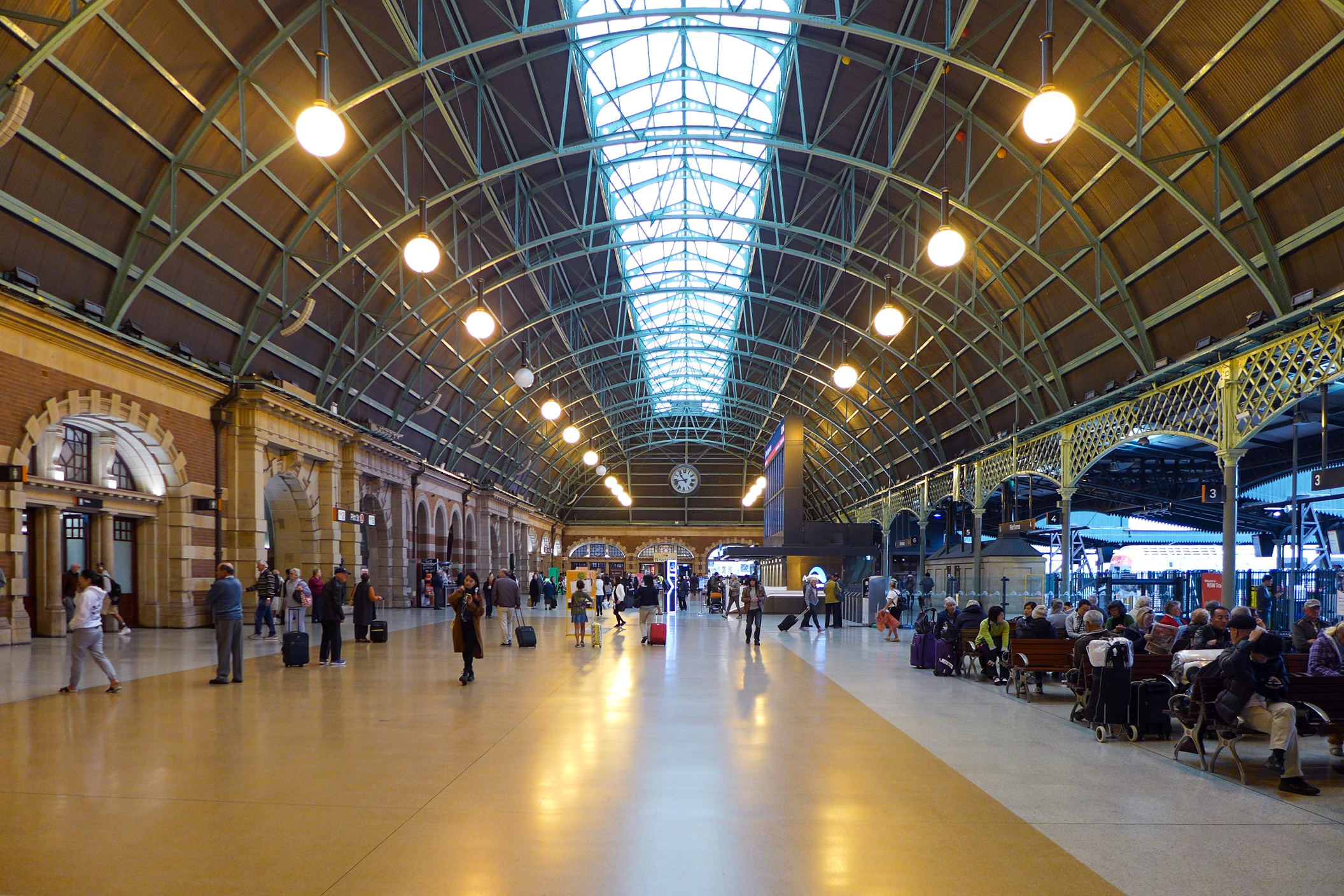
The Grand Concourse of Central station

Public transport in Sydney

- Air transport in Sydney
  - Airports in Sydney
    - Rose Bay Water Airport
    - Sydney Airport
    - Western Sydney Airport
- Maritime transport in Sydney
  - Sydney Ferries
    - Manly ferry services
- Road transport in Sydney
  - Buses in Sydney
    - NightRide
  - Cycling in Sydney
    - Bike paths in Sydney
      - Sydney Harbour Bridge cycleway

==== Rail transport in Sydney ====
Rail transport in Sydney

- City Circle
- Light rail in Sydney

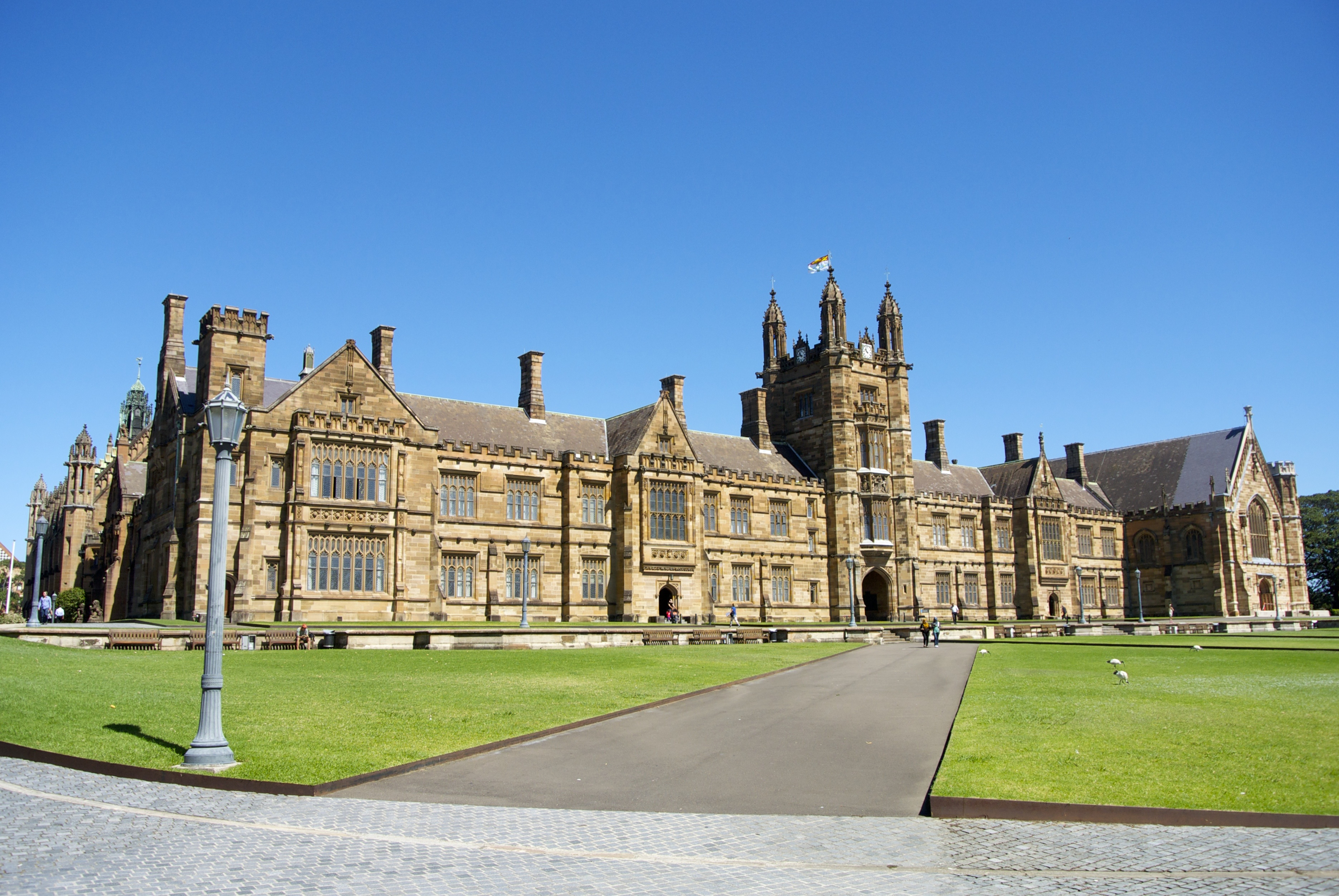
University of Sydney

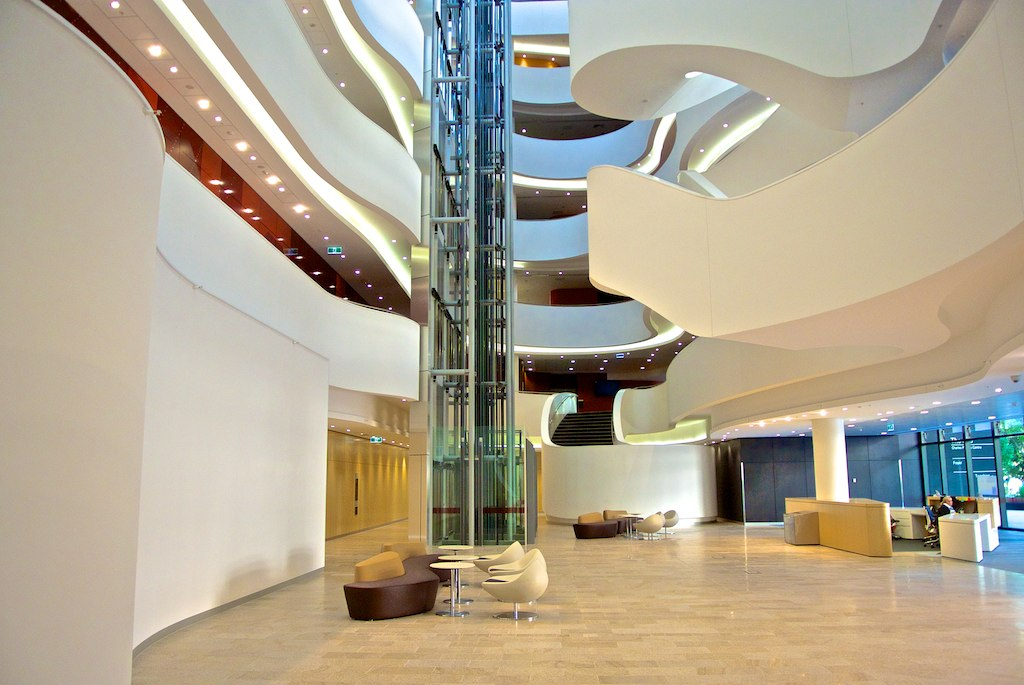
Atrium of the Charles Perkins Centre

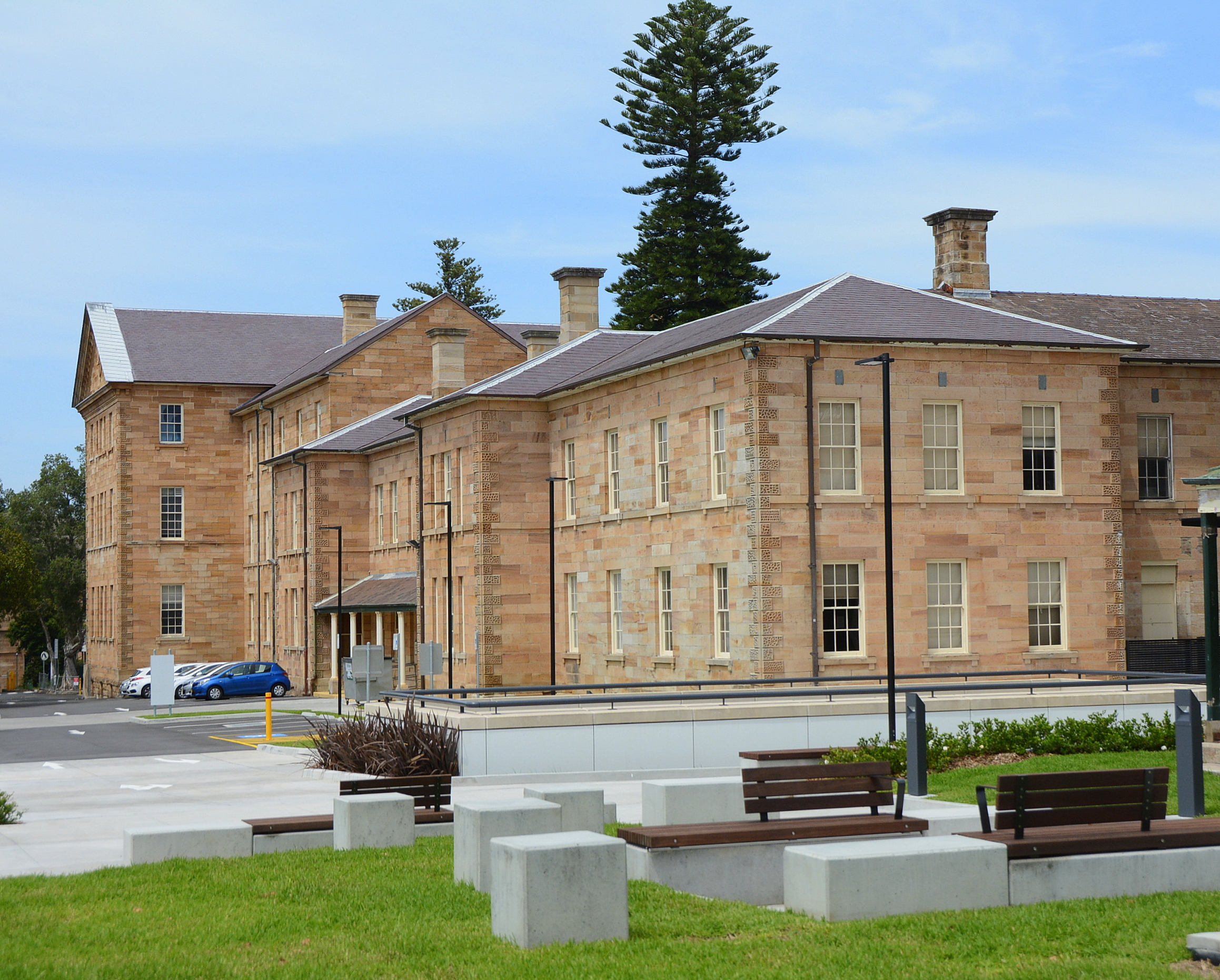
The Prince of Wales Hospital

- Railways in Sydney
  - Proposed railways in Sydney
  - Railway stations in Sydney
    - Central railway station
- Sydney Metro
  - Sydney Metro Northwest
  - Sydney Metro City & Southwest
- Sydney Trains
  - List of Sydney Trains railway stations
  - Sydney Trains rolling stock

== Education in Sydney ==
Education in Sydney

- Universities in Sydney
  - University of New South Wales
  - University of Sydney
  - University of Technology Sydney
  - Macquarie University
  - Western Sydney University
- Research institutes in Sydney
  - Charles Perkins Centre
  - Westmead Institute for Medical Research

== Healthcare in Sydney ==
Healthcare in Sydney

- Hospitals in Sydney
  - Blacktown Hospital
  - Nepean Hospital
  - Northern Beaches Hospital
  - Prince of Wales Hospital
  - Royal North Shore Hospital
  - St Vincent's Hospital
  - Sydney Hospital

== See also ==
- Outline of geography
