= Seidler =

Seidler is a German and Yiddish occupational surname. Notable people with the surname include:

- Aldo Emilio Seidler (born 1954), Argentine chess master
- Alma Seidler (1899–1977), Austrian actress
- David Seidler (1937-2024), British-American playwright
- Ernst Seidler von Feuchtenegg (1862–1931), Austrian Prime Minister from 1917 to 1918
- Franz W. Seidler (born 1933), German historian
- Harry Seidler (1923–2006), Austrian-Australian architect, spouse of Penelope Seidler
- Helga Seidler (born 1949), German athlete
- Kamilla Seidler (born 1983), Danish chef
- Karoline Seidler-Wranitzky (1790–1872), Czech operatic soprano
- Louise Seidler (1786–1866), German painter
- Michal Seidler (born 1990), Czech futsal
- Penelope Seidler (born 1938), Australian architect, spouse of Harry Seidler
- Peter Seidler (1960–2023), American businessman
- Stefan Seidler (born 1979), Danish-German politician

== See also ==
- Şeidlər, Azerbaijan
- Harry and Penelope Seidler House
- Rose Seidler House
