= Harry and Penelope Seidler House =

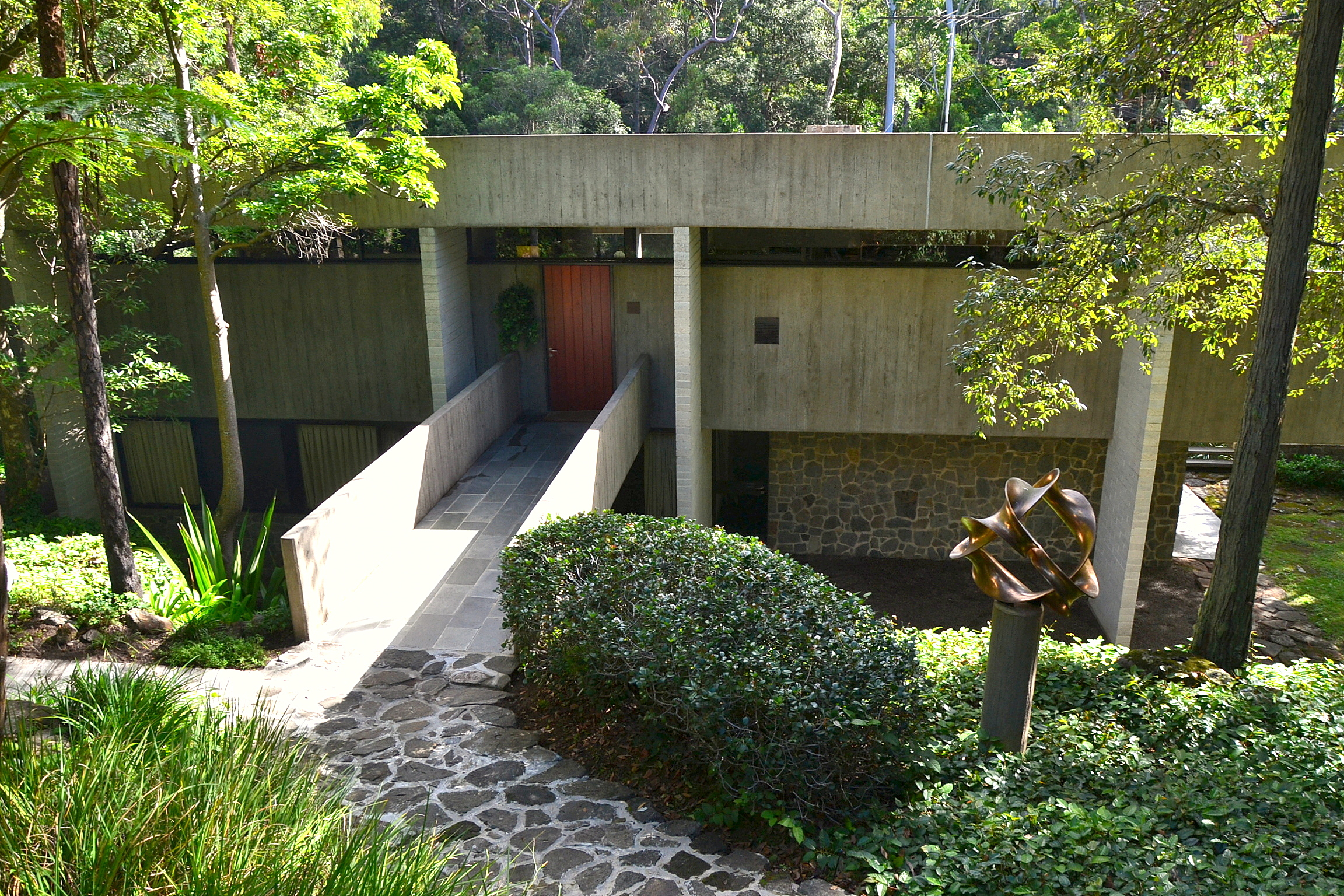
- Harry and Penelope Seidler house

- Location within Sydney
- 33°45′33″S 151°09′59″E
- Location: 13 Kalang Avenue, Killara, New South Wales, Australia

History
- Built: 1966–1967

Site notes
- Architect(s): Harry and Penelope Seidler
- Owner: Penelope Seidler

New South Wales Heritage Register
- Official name: Harry and Penelope Seidler House
- Type: State heritage (built)
- Designated: 20 June 2008
- Reference no.: 1793
- Type: House
- Category: Residential buildings (private)
- Builders: Peter Cussel

The Harry and Penelope Seidler House is a heritage-listed modernist house located at 13 Kalang Avenue in the Sydney suburb of Killara, Australia. It was designed by architects Penelope and Harry Seidler and Harry Seidler & Associates, and built from 1966 to 1967 by Peter Cussel. It was added to the New South Wales State Heritage Register on 20 June 2008.

== History ==
=== Harry Seidler ===
Harry Seidler AC, OBE (25/06/1923 – 9/03/2006) was born in Vienna in 1923 into a middle-class Jewish family. The Anschluss terminated Seidler's schooling and influenced Seidler's parents Max Seidler and Rose Seidler (née Schwarz) to send their youngest son on a student visa to England where he joined his brother Marcell. On 12 May 1940, he and his older brother were interned as "enemy aliens" - first at Bury St Edmonds, then Liverpool, the Isle of Man (where he turned 17), and Quebec in Canada. Seidler's diaries record the humiliation and discomfort of internment and the fact that he and his brother were interned alongside Nazi prisoners of war.

Seidler's parents managed to follow their sons to England thus escaping the destruction of European Jewry by the Nazis. They eventually migrated to Australia where the family's only known relatives outside Austria, the Hermans had moved in the 1920s and established Herman Plastic Mouldings. In 1938 Mr Herman sponsored Seidler's uncle Marcus to move to Australia where he set up a clothing manufacturing business in Sydney. This business established the Seidler family in Sydney.

In 1941 Seidler was released to study at the University of Manitoba where he obtained a Bachelor of Architecture degree with first class honours. After a year of architectural work in Canada he won a scholarship to the Harvard School of Design where he studied under Walter Gropius, former head of Bauhaus. During this time Seidler (and his classmate Peter Oberander) worked with Alvo Aalto, in Cambridge Massachusetts, drawing up plans for Aalto's Baker Dormitory at MIT. He left Harvard's "electrifying atmosphere" with the "feeling that we were destined to play our part in transforming the visual man made world." Seidler's commitment to Modernism was reinforced by his attendance at the 1946 summer school at Black Mountain College where he studied with Josef Albers, former design teacher at the Bauhaus.

In 1946-48 Seidler was chief assistant to Marcel Breuer in his New York office. It was at this point in 1948 that he was enticed to Australia by his mother Rose Seidler to design and build a house for his parents. He came to Australia via Brazil and contact with the Brazilian architect Oscar Niemeyer, for whom he worked for several months.

Philip Drew has written that "the dominant influences on Seidler were Gropius, Breuer and Albers; Gropius revealed the ethical basis of Modern architecture and demonstrated the importance of method, Breuer, in a real sense showed Seidler how buildings are made, and developed his architectonic skills as well as influencing his appreciation of space and feeling for materials, but it was from Josef Albers that Seidler learned about the perceptual basis of visual form."

Rose Seidler House at Wahroonga on Sydney's North Shore was Seidler's first commission, for his mother. He was 25 at the time. It was built in 1948–50 as part of a family estate of three houses (including Julian Rose House c.1950 and the Marcus Seidler House c.1949-51). Located on 2.6 hectares of natural bushland overlooking the Ku-ring-gai National Park, it was a watershed in Australian culture. As possibly the purest example of mid-century modern domestic architecture in Australia, it was enormously controversial when built, stimulating much social comment and intellectual debate. Rose Seidler House is listed on the State Heritage Register and is run as a house museum by the Historic Houses Trust.

Seidler's American take on Modernism contrasted with the European modernism of early Australian adopters such as Syd Ancher and Robin Boyd. Seidler was lauded by an older generation of modernists in Australia such as Boyd, Baldwinson and Ancher. Seidler stood his ground and refused to compromise his architectural vision in the face of restrictive building regulations in New South Wales during the 1940s and 1950s, leading to several landmark court cases.

Seidler's early houses from 1949 to 1954 established an authentic version of modern architecture embracing Gropius' modernist principles (which stemmed from the Bauhaus). He designed many houses in either the box-like form of Le Corbusier or the "H" plan of Marcel Breuer. Seidler was busy throughout the 1950s largely designing houses for private clients.

In the early 1960s Seidler began to receive commissions for apartments and office buildings such as Ithaca Gardens Apartments in Elizabeth Bay (1960), Blues Point Tower apartments in McMahons Point (1961); Lend Lease House in Sydney (1961) [Demolished 19??] and Arlington apartments at Edgecliff (1965–66). Only four significant small projects were undertaken between 1962 and 1969: a ski lodge in Thredbo (1962), a holiday house in Port Hacking (1963), the Seidlers' own home (1966–67) and the memorial to victims of the Holocaust, at Rookwood Cemetery (1969).

In the mid-1960s Seidler began experimenting with circular, elliptical and curvilinear geometrics. The choice of a circular plan for the ground breaking Australia Square (1963–67) marked an important departure from the established rectilinear order of Seidler's earlier work [Philip Drew].

In the 1970s Seidler's practice was largely devoted to major commercial projects in Australia and abroad. This period saw the design and construction of Seidler's own offices at Glen Street, Milsons Point, Sydney; the MLC Centre in Sydney (1972); the Edmund Barton Building, Canberra; the Australian Embassy in Paris; and commissions in Singapore (not realised) and Hong Kong.

The 1980s saw the construction of major commercial buildings such as Grosvenor Place in Sydney (1988); the Waverley Civic Centre (now called Monash City Council) at Waverley in Victoria (1982); Capita Centre in Sydney (1984); Shell Headquarters in Melbourne (1985); the QV1 tower in Perth (1987) and the Riverside Centre in Brisbane (1987).

In 1990s Harry Seidler and Associates designed celebrated and iconic residences and apartments such as Berman House at Joadja in the Southern Highlands (1996) and Horizon Apartments in Darlinghurst (1999).

The new century was notable for works such as the Cove Apartments at the Rocks (2004) and the Ian Thorpe Aquatic Centre at Ultimo.

Internationally Seidler is known for the Australian Embassy in Paris, the Hong Kong Club and Offices, a community for 2500 people in Vienna, as well as buildings in Acapulco.

=== Harry and Penelope Seidler House ===
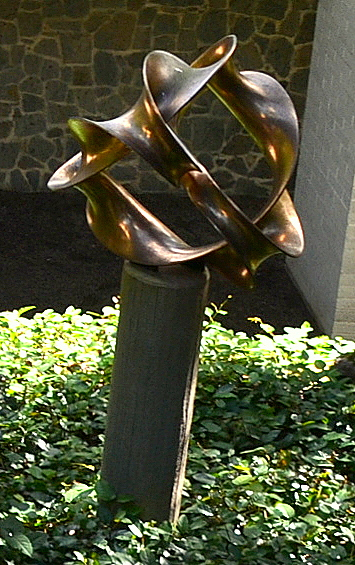
Sculpture outside house

After more than twenty five years designing houses for other people, Seidler and his wife Penelope determined to design a house for their own family. The site selected after much searching was located by Penelope Seidler in Killara, an established suburb of Sydney. Surrounded by a natural bush reserve, the site's rocky sandstone ledges slope steeply down toward a creek and a waterfall.

The rugged sloped land was turned to advantage by providing the rationale for a vertical dimension to the design. The Seidlers described their house as "essentially a simple rectangular outline." The four half-storey levels of the house follow the slope of the land and create between them open vertical spaces which strengthen the design's horizontal openness within and extension outward onto sunny terraces.

Seidler described the construction of the house as "solid, with muscle; everlasting." The construction of the house is of maintenance free materials, off formed concrete (inside and out) and basalt rubble stone. Three rows of vertical reinforced white concrete block piers support suspended and cantilevered concrete floors, and roof. The very long horizontal and sloping projections are stiffened by rail height parapets.

The rough textured off form concrete contrasts with the rough textured blue grey basalt walling. The floors of the living areas are surfaced with split slabs of Norwegian quartzite stone and ceiling lined with Tasmanian oak boarding. Seidler plays off textures against each other, cool is juxtaposed with warm, smooth with rough, white with primary colours.

The concrete masonry and glass of the house contrasted the precise geometry of its evident man made forms with the rugged complexity of its stony, sloping site. This house broke with the past in favouring board formed concrete and concrete block, permanent masonry in lieu of the Harvard timber idiom he pursued in the 1950s. Philip Drew has described this house as "a Brutalist "Falling Water", more American, more late Breuer in its strong forms, and Viennese in its will to permanence, in its hard Norwegian quartzite floors and determination to impose an aesthetic on the Australian bush."

Instead of building a road on to the site, the Seidlers placed the garage and visitors' car park area at the top of the hill, directly off the street dramatically suspended over a large rock ledge which was left exposed.

The house is set within a native landscape designed by the pioneering landscape architect, Bruce Mackenzie (b.1932) who provided the landscape design for a number of Seidler's projects. A swimming pool designed by Seidler was built below the house in the 1970s.

The house is widely regarded as the most outstanding example in Australia of a house in the Brutalist style. It should however, be noted that Seidler strongly rejected this label and distanced himself from the Brutalists [Refer to Seidler's 1987 essay "Architecture and Planning at the end of our Century" published in "Four Decades of Architecture"]. The Royal Australian Institute of Architects awarded the house the coveted Wilkinson Award, the third won by Seidler in his then nineteen years of Australian practice.

In a 1994 interview for Australian Broadcasting Corporation television "Harry Seidler: A Life" Seidler said of his home "I don't think I want to live anywhere else, ever - marvellous house. We love our environment and we've never changed anything, it is as exactly as it was. The only thing that might have changed is some of the artworks...But the house itself, I think will long outlast us."

Harry Seidler resided at this house until his death at the age of 82, at home on 9 March 2006, after fifty-seven years of practice as an architect in NSW.

Harry Seidler was awarded the RAIA Gold Medal in 1977 the institute's highest honour, for outstanding achievement in architectural design and the promotion of architecture and the profession. The RAIA Citation states:

"Since arriving in Australia he has practised with determined and uncompromising dedication to the cause of modern architecture. Now internationally recognised as a member of the Third Generation of 20th Century Architects, he has produced an idiom that is an amalgam of the best of the several cultures to which he has been exposed and is placed firmly in the mainstream of Modern Architecture. Three of the many contributions which he has made to architecture are, firstly the influence which he has had on young architects and students, by who he was and by what he said, rather than solely by what he did; secondly the influence which he has had on building regulations and statutory controls; and thirdly the immense contribution he has made to the public awareness of architecture."

=== Bruce Mackenzie, landscape architect ===
Bruce Mackenzie was born in Sydney in 1932. He studied art at East Sydney Technical College before working in the graphic arts industry. He came to consider the study of landscape architecture his life's commitment and began working in the field in 1959. After ten years of landscape and design construction, though without formal training, he was admitted into the Australian Institute of Landscape Architects in 1969 and became National president in 1981.

Bruce Mackenzie pioneered the use and conservation of indigenous Australian planting that made use of natural structural materials and native plants, combining a romantic attachment to landscape aesthetics with a pragmatic approach to conservation. He is considered one of the foremost practitioners of the 1970s and 1980s in the promotion of landscape design that respected and harmonized with natural environments. Significantly his first article extolling the use of native plants was published in "Architecture in Australia" in November 1966.

In the late 1960s Mackenzie founded the firm Bruce Mackenzie and Associates. His office was located in Ridge Street, North Sydney, in a building housing client architects such as Harry Seidler, Bruce Rickard and Harry Howard.

Bruce Mackenzie in reflecting on his involvement with the landscape design for Harry and Penelope Seidler House advised "they were early days in my career path and I would not want to add unwarranted emphasis on my contribution to the success of the building and its landscape setting. The main ingredients were already there in the form of remnant mature native trees and the landform of the small stream that the house overlooked. I merely reinforced these elements while the house itself stood proud." Mackenzie, who has had a long association with the Seidlers, has further reflected that "I may have to a small degree helped introduce Harry Seidler to a new consideration of landscape and its relationship to buildings and in particular to his house. The simple play for instance, of shadowed leaf patterns dancing on crisply defined facades, gained his attention and raised the image of landscape as a dynamic participant."

=== Penelope Seidler, nee Evatt ===
Penelope Alice Marjorie Seidler (née Evatt) BArch, BBus, FRAIA, ASA was born in 1938. An architect and Seidler's professional partner, Penelope Seidler is the daughter of the Hon. Clive Raleigh Evatt QC (b.1900 d.1984); a prominent NSW Labor politician, Member for Hurstville 1939–59, and his wife Marjorie Hanna Evatt (née Andreas), (b.1903 d.1984).

The Hon. Clive Raleigh Evatt QC, the younger brother of the famous Labor Party leader and international jurist, Herbert Vere Evatt (also known as H. V. Evatt or Doc Evatt) was representative of a new generation of non-union, liberally minded men who stressed the need for the Labor Party to appeal to a broad electorate. A man of progressive views, as NSW Minister for Planning in the McGirr Labor NSW Government, Evatt overturned Willoughby Council's rejection of Harry Seidler's design for Meller House in Castlecrag, authorising its construction as a "demonstration home" in 1950. Several years later Seidler would marry Penelope Evatt on 15 December 1958.

Harry Seidler has described his first visit to the Evatt family home at 69 Junction Road, Wahroonga, in 1950 as "momentous" and cites the Hon. Clive Evatt's support as persuasive in his decision to remain and work in Australia. The Evatt family home, now known as Parklands, is also listed on the State Heritage Register.

The marriage to Penelope Evatt provided an entree into Australian political life. The pair attracted a good deal of publicity epitomising the up-to-the-minute modern couple.

== Description ==
- Architects: Harry and Penelope Seidler, Harry Seidler & Associates
- Structural Engineers: Miller, Milston & Ferris
- Lighting: Edison Price (New York)
- Landscape Architect: Bruce Mackenzie

Covering 400 square metres (4,300 sq ft), the house is constructed with reinforced masonry walls, concrete floors and roof, with rubble-stone retaining walls and fireplace. It won the Royal Australian Institute of Architects (NSW Chapter)'s Wilkinson Award in 1967.

A concrete bridge leads from the entrance over a drop to the front door where the Wilkinson Award plaque is located. The site is steeply sloping and challenging for a concrete home, the sandstone and base concrete slab do not touch each other, and the house sits on piers dug into the sandstone ground.

The house has three upper levels that are only partially open to each other, and a fourth lower level. On the top level is the kitchen and dining room, a small gallery and a balcony. The second level has the living area with balcony and master bedroom. Both these (upper) levels share the same ceiling which is under the roof—and is lined with Tasmanian oak. A large pool and outdoor area was added in 1976. The home is surrounded by natural Australian bush in a suburb which is only 15 km from Sydney's central business district. The home is furnished with 1960s and 1970s modernist art works and modern furniture by Breuer and Eames.

The building occupies a steep bushland site, sloping westwards to a creek. The building is approached from the road at the top and steps down from a cantilevered garage through four half levels which follow the slope of the land. The structure consist of four suspended concrete trays supported by reinforced concrete block traverse blades which divide the building into north facing daytime/active spaces, a central circulation spine and night time/passive spaces. The top level consists of kitchen, dining and study, the next living room and main bedroom, the third children's room and bathroom, with studio, laundry and guest bedroom at the bottom having access to the garden.

The house embodies both a vertical and horizontal extension of space. The level changes and central open well provide a visual link from top to bottom. Large areas of glass and projecting terraces draw the eye out from each level to the natural landscape setting. Materials include board formed reinforced concrete, rubble stonework, white concrete block work and Tasmanian Oak boarded ceilings. The integrated artworks include K Nolan, Frank Stella, H Frankenthaler, work by Sam Frances, a Charles Perry sculpture, Max Bill, several "Positive-Negative" sculptures by Norman Carlberg and two Calder stabiles. The garden contains a sculpture by the Los Angeles sculptor Eric Orr.

=== Occupancy ===
Harry and Penelope Seidler moved into the building on Harry Seidler's birthday in 1967 and lived there for the remaining years of his life. Harry Seidler suffered a paralytic stroke on late 24 April 2005 and died of sepsis on 9 March 2006. As of 2016, Penelope Seidler continued to reside at the house, and to work as an architect.

=== Condition ===
As at 6 January 2005, Physical condition is excellent. Archaeological potential is not known.

The building and associated art works have a high degree of integrity as a result of its having remained the Seidlers' principal residence since 25 June 1967.

=== Modifications and dates ===
- 1976 – A swimming pool designed by Harry Seidler was added in 1976.
- 1997 – A garage door was installed for privacy reasons. The electrical wiring for such a door had actually been installed when the house was constructed in 1967, in case he ever changed his mind about installing a garage door.

== See also ==
- Australian residential architectural styles
- Rose Seidler House
