= Göyməmmədli =

- Location within Azerbaijan
- Coordinates: 40°46′20″N 45°56′57″E
- Country: Azerbaijan
- Rayon: Shamkir
- Municipality: Qasımalılar
- Time zone: UTC+4 (AZT)
  - Summer (DST): UTC+5 (AZT)

Göyməmmədli is a village in the Shamkir Rayon of Azerbaijan. The village forms part of the municipality of Qasımalılar.
