= Australian Architecture Association =

Not-for-profit organisation

- Abbreviation: AAA
- Formation: 2004; 22 years ago
- Legal status: Professional body; members association
- Location: Sydney
- Region served: Australia
- Fields: Architecture
- Members: 700
- President: Tone Wheeler

The Australian Architecture Association (AAA) was established in 2004 as a not-for-profit organisation to promote the understanding of both local and world architecture in Australia. The Chicago Architecture Foundation (CAF) was used as the model for the development of the organisation in its initial phases.

The Australian Architecture Association is based in Sydney. The 2025–2026 president is Tone Wheeler.

== History ==
In late 2004, the Australian Architecture Association began to offer talks by internationally renowned architects as the Black Talk Series. In 2005, regular architecture tours showcased important buildings and architecture of Sydney. The tours were led by volunteer tour leaders and began in Sydney city, as well as architecturally significant suburbs of Surry Hills and Castlecrag.

In 2006, the Australian Architecture Association started the annual Sydney Architecture Festival on World Architecture Day, first Monday of every October, with the Australian Institute of Architects and the New South Wales Architects Registration Board.

By 2006, the AAA had around 700 members.

== Founding Committee ==
The founding committee had a mix of architects, marketing professionals and publicists. The founding President was Glenn Murcutt, winner of the 2002 Pritzker Prize and the founding committee consisted of: Wendy Lewin, Harry Seidler, Richard Johnson, James Grose, Ian Moore, Alex Popov, David Bare and Manu Siitonen. Supporting them were the founding directors, Stella de Vulder and Annette Dearing.
