= Helen O'Neill (journalist) =

Helen O'Neill is a Walkley Award-nominated Australian freelance journalist and author. Born and educated in the United Kingdom, O'Neill worked as a newspaper and TV journalist in Australia, the United States and the United Kingdom and is now an Australian resident. O'Neill was awarded an Australian Literary Council Grant in 2009 which included a six-month residency at the Keesing Studio in Paris.

== Publications ==
Her first book, Life Without Limits, is a biography of David Pescud, a dyslexic who pioneered Sailors with Disabilities.

O'Neill is best known as author of Florence Broadhurst: Her Secret and Extraordinary Lives, which details the life and art of the famous wallpaper and fabric designer Florence Broadhurst, whose death remains a mystery. The book was longlisted for a Walkley Award in 2006.

The Australian department store David Jones commissioned O'Neill to write David Jones – 175 Years, whose publication in 2013 celebrated the retailer's 175th anniversary.

A Singular Vision: Harry Seidler, her biography of architect Harry Seidler appeared in 2014. It was short-listed that same year for the Australian Book Design Awards, and, in 2015, for the Australian National Biography Awards.

O'Neill's most recent publication Daffodil – Biography of a Flower appeared in 2017.

== Articles ==
- "Search for the Duck of Doom". Sydney Morning Herald. 29 November 2008.
- Words don't come easy, 29 May 2003 Sydney Morning Herald

== Bibliography ==
- Life Without Limits, Random House, Sydney, 2003 ISBN 9781863253734
- Florence Broadhurst – Her Secret and Extraordinary Lives, Hardie Grant, Sydney, 2006
- David Jones – 175 Years, NewSouth Publishing, Sydney, 2013
- A Singular Vision: Harry Seidler, HarperCollins, Sydney, 2014
- Daffodil – Biography of a Flower, HarperCollins, Sydney, 2017
