= Şeidlər =

Village in Shamkir Rayon, Azerbaijan

Coordinates: 40°47′N 45°56′E

Şeidlər is a village in Shamkir District, Azerbaijan. It was separated from the Qasımalılar village administrative-territorial unit and established as its own unit, centered on Şeidlər on 5 October 1999.

== History ==
Şeidlər was formed in the 1930s when the uğuzlu (also known as hacılar), zeynallar, and kəlbhəsənli clans were resettled to an area known as Şeidlər yeri. The village takes its name from that area, itself believed to derive from the word şəhid, meaning martyr.
