= Capita Centre =

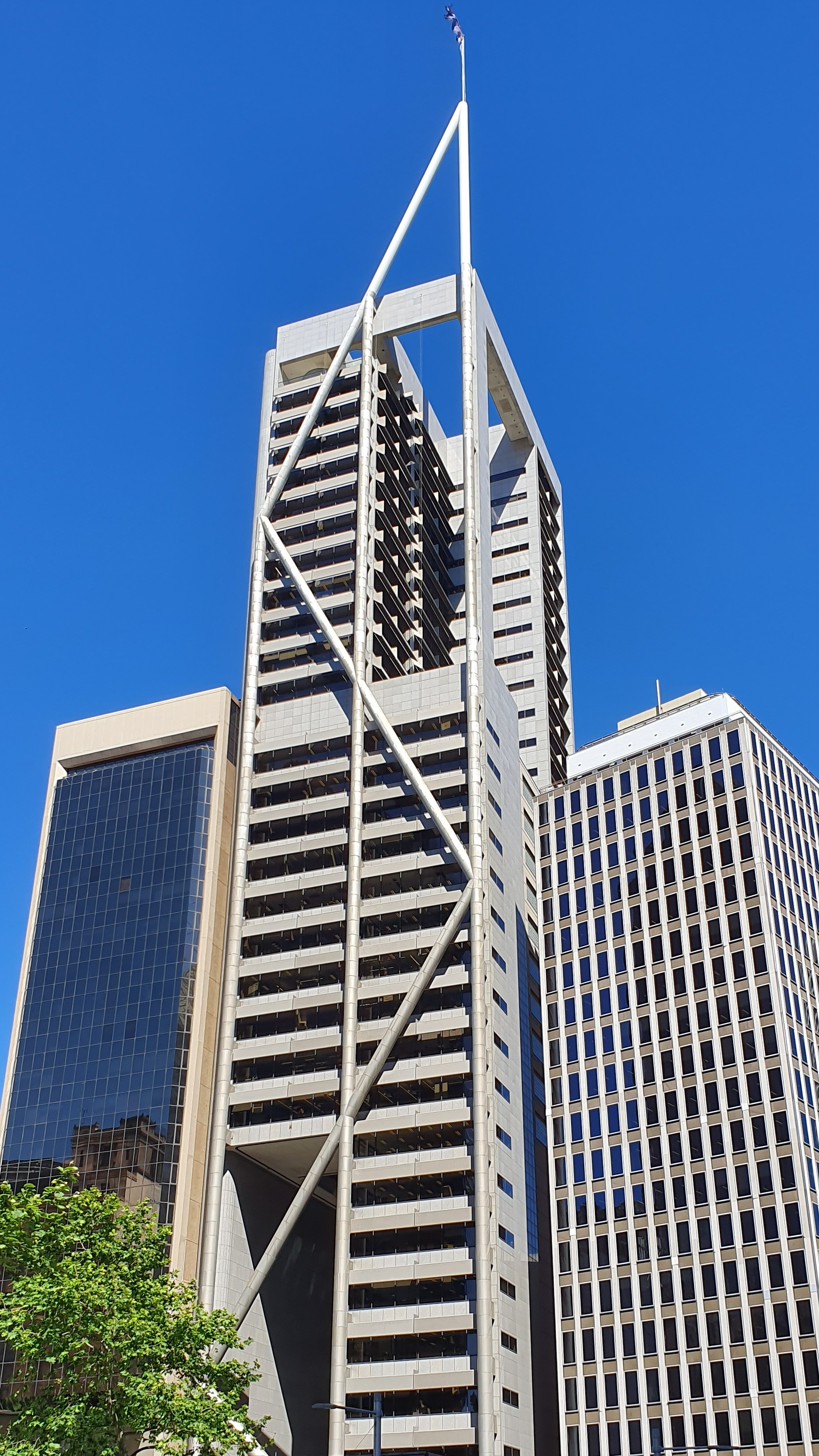
- Capita Centre
- Interactive map of the Capita Centre area

General information
- Status: Completed
- Type: Office
- Location: Sydney, Australia
- Coordinates: 33.8666°S 151.2096°E
- Construction started: 1984
- Opening: 1989
- Owner: Charter Hall

Height
- Antenna spire: 183 metres (600 ft)
- Roof: 158 metres (518 ft)

Technical details
- Floor count: 31

Design and construction
- Architect: Harry Seidler
- Structural engineer: Miller, Milston & Ferris
- Main contractor: Civil & Civic

Capita Centre, now known as 9 Castlereagh Street, is a skyscraper in Sydney, Australia. Located at 9–11 Castlereagh Street, it is 183 metres (600 ft) tall from spire and 158 metres (518 ft) tall from roof. The building was designed by Harry Seidler & Associates in 1984 and completed in 1989. The building won Royal Australian Institute of Architects (NSW) merit award 1991.

== Design ==
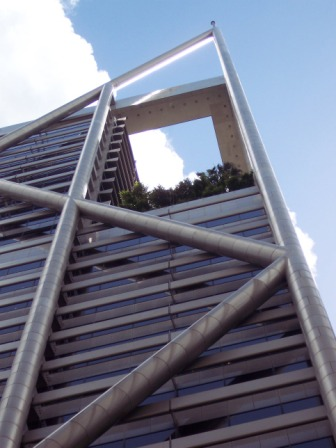
Rooftop garden

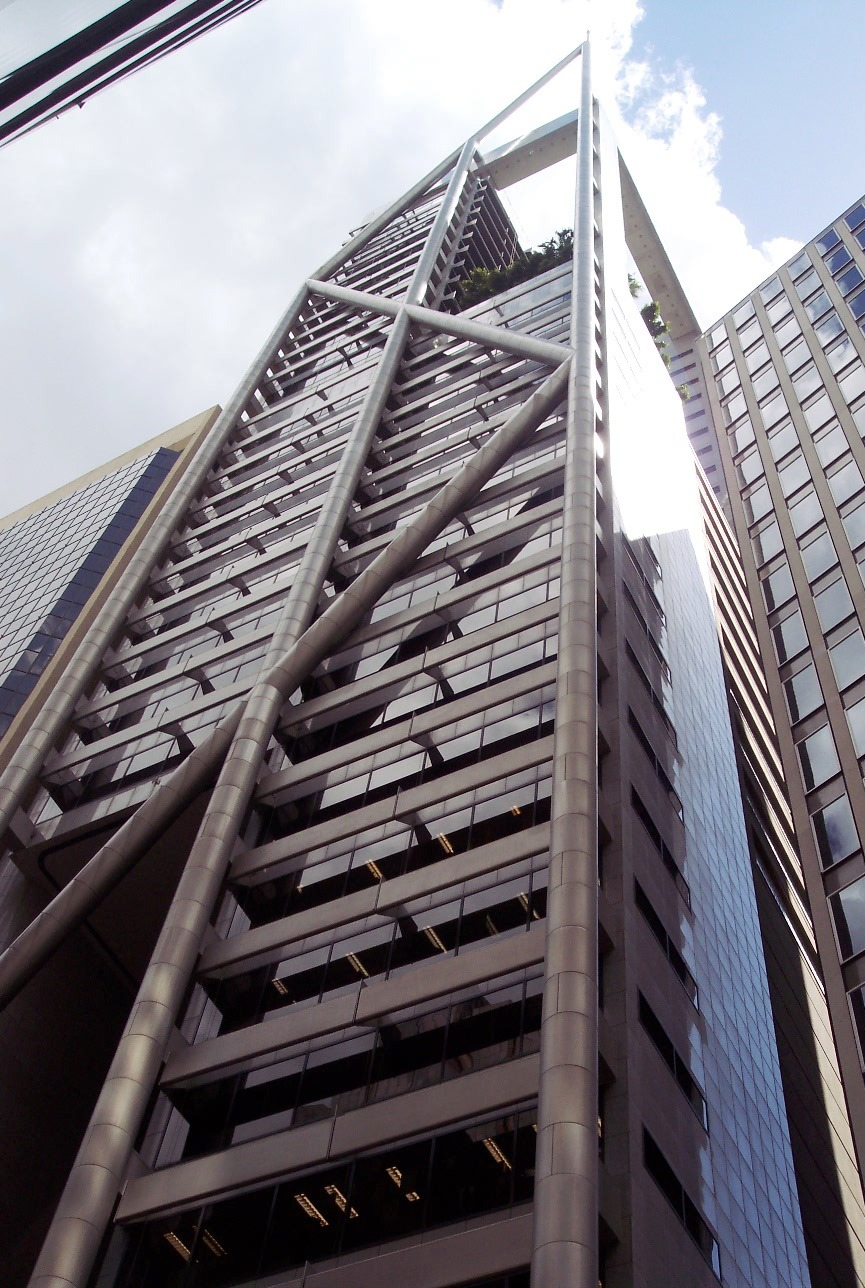
Street-level view

The Capita Centre is rectangular and consists of 31 levels, with a total floor area of 24,450 square metres (263,200 sq ft). The building's floor plan was conceptually divided into six square sections. At each level only four of these squares were built on, leaving a third of the building hollowed out to its full height by a lightwell. This lightwell has a stepped profile, allowing for a diagonal light shaft through the building. Palms and fig trees are planted on the resulting upper setbacks of the building.

The design's stepped hollowing created a laterally unstable structural condition. Since no shear-resisting walls were possible, an external vertical truss brace-frame is placed outside the facade. The columns and diagonal bracings are encased in curved glass reinforced concrete panels (with Bonnflon coating), giving them smooth cylindrical finishes. The truss is topped with a 30-metre retractable flagpole. The building's exterior is cladded in polished granite facades.

A thoroughfare was originally planned to link Castlereagh Street to Angel Place (at Pitt Street), via the forecourt of the building. It would have connected with a landscaped transition space at the rear of the building, then lead west to a pathway towards Pitt Street. The link was not implemented and is no longer possible, as the land to the west had since been developed. The rear space has since been incorporated into a glazed courtyard.

== History ==
The building was designed to be the new company headquarters for City Mutual (Life Assurance Society Ltd). The land-locked site at 9 Castlereagh St was chosen because of its close proximity to the company's old landmark City Mutual Life Assurance Building at 60–66 Hunter Street. City Mutual wanted their new headquarters to be lavish, so no expense was spared in the building design. In 1987, City Mutual changed its name to Capita, which ultimately became the building's namesake.

The structural engineer was Miller, Milston & Ferris, while construction was contracted to Civil & Civic. The building was built at a cost of $110m and was opened in 1989. At the time, Capita held one of the largest office tenancies in the Sydney CBD's financial sector, among Commonwealth Bank and National Australia Bank.

After Capita went into liquidation, the building at 9 Castlereagh St then became a tenanted commercial office tower. In 1994, Keppel Corporation acquired the building for A$78.1 million under its subsidiary Straits Steamship Land.

In 2001–02, the building was acquired by a group of investors led by Terry Agnew for A$121 million. In 2004, a naming rights request for the building by TD Securities was rejected by the City of Sydney council. Subsequently, Agnew took the council's decision to the Land and Environment Court, citing inconsistencies with the guidelines in place for selling naming rights to buildings.

In 2008, Stockland received the building and approximately A$22 million, as part of a property exchange with Terry Agnew, who in turn acquired their Northpoint complex in North Sydney. In 2010–11, Stockland commissioned Harry Seidler & Associates, the building's original designer, to refurbish the lobby and forecourt. The new forecourt garden featured a variety of tropical plants including peace lilies, giant taro and lacy tree ferns. The refurbishment project won Australian Institute of Architects (NSW) Commercial Architecture Award Commendation 2012.

In 2013, Charter Hall acquired the building from Stockland for A$172.5 million. In 2024, Harry Seidler & Associates were once again commissioned to refurbish the lobby and forecourt of the building, featuring a new café.

== Artworks ==
A porcelain mural by Lin Utzon is in the ground floor lobby - installed in 1989. The mural measures 12 by 15 metres and comprises over 7,000 tiles which were produced at the Royal Copenhagen Porcelain Factory.

There was a second Lin Utzon sculpture "Capita 2" on the company executive floor. The last managing director of Capita (who later ran the company into liquidation) did not like the executive floor's design so arranged for the whole Seidler -designed executive floor on Level 31 to be gutted. Some architects from the Seidler office saved the Utzon artwork from being destroyed (traced wall paint outline and removed the porcelain cylinders). This Lin Utzon artwork featured at Museum of Sydney during a Harry Seidler exhibition in late 2014–15, and in 2016 was reassembled to Seidler office penthouse, Milsons Point. A sculpture by Charles O. Perry titled "30” Helix Mobius Mace" (1988) was also part of Capita's executive floor on level 31, but when the executive floor was gutted, the sculpture was moved to the building basement. The Perry sculpture was later relocated to the building's entry lobby as part of the ground floor enhancements of 2011.

== See also ==
- Skyscrapers in Sydney
