= Horizon Apartments =

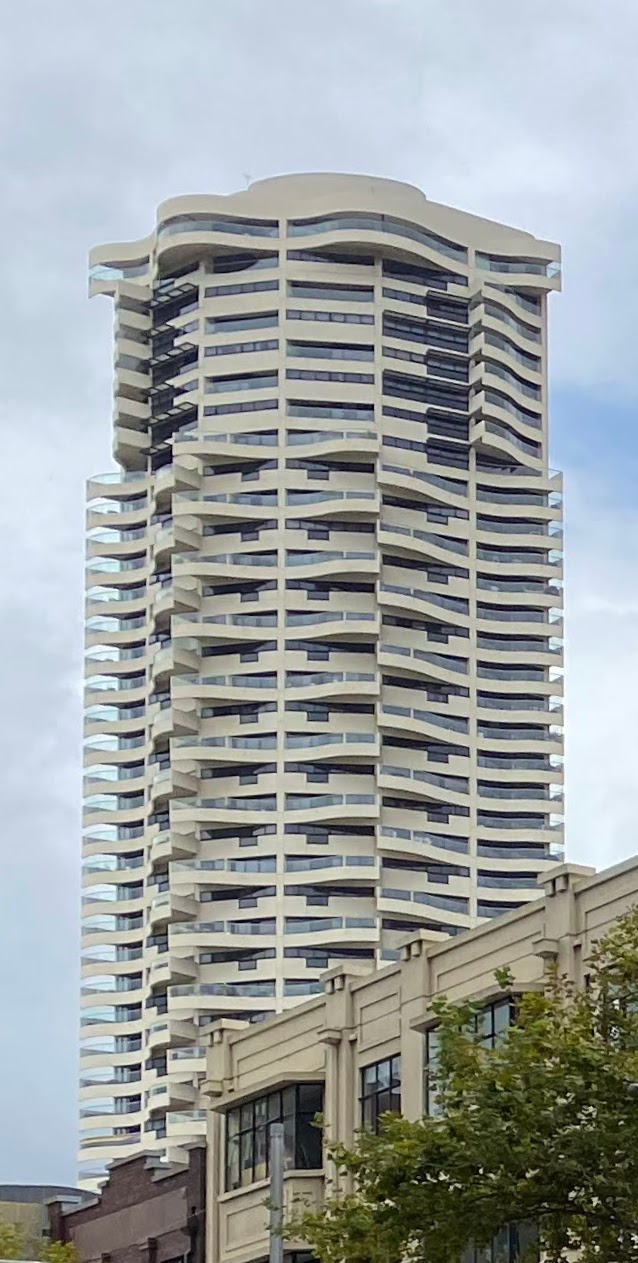
- View from a southerly aspect

General information
- Status: Completed
- Type: Residential
- Location: Sydney, Australia
- Coordinates: 33.87590°S 151.21921°E
- Construction started: 1996
- Completed: 1998

Height
- Roof: 143.9 m (472 ft)

Technical details
- Floor count: 43
- Floor area: 32,000 m^{2} (340,000 sq ft)

Design and construction
- Architect: Harry Seidler
- Developer: Kwok Group

The Horizon Apartments, also short The Horizon, is a residential high rise building in Darlinghurst, a suburb in the inner-city of Sydney, NSW, Australia. It is located on at 184 Forbes Street between Liverpool and William Streets. The controversial highrise was completed in 1998. Controversy stems from the height of the building and the shadowing effects on surrounding buildings. It has and has had many celebrity residents, such as Charlotte Dawson, Harry M. Miller, David Walsh, Francesca Packer Jacki Weaver and Joh Bailey.

== Design ==
The 143.9 metres (472 ft) tall and 43 story prestressed concrete structure, designed by the Austro-Australian architect Harry Seidler was constructed between 1996 and 1998 by the Melbourne based Grollo Constructions, generally also known as Grocon. The building features 260 apartments with a total floor space of 32,000 square metres (340,000 sq ft). It has a distinctive scalloped facade, and is finished in rendered concrete.

The design allowed for larger apartments in the top quarter, with balconies facing east towards the Pacific Ocean to maximise views. The location and shape of the building has also been chosen to benefit views of the Sydney Opera House and Harbour Bridge.

The building was awarded the 1999 Wilkinson Award by the NSW Chapter of the Australian Institute of Architects.
