= Penelope Seidler =

Australian architect (born 1938)

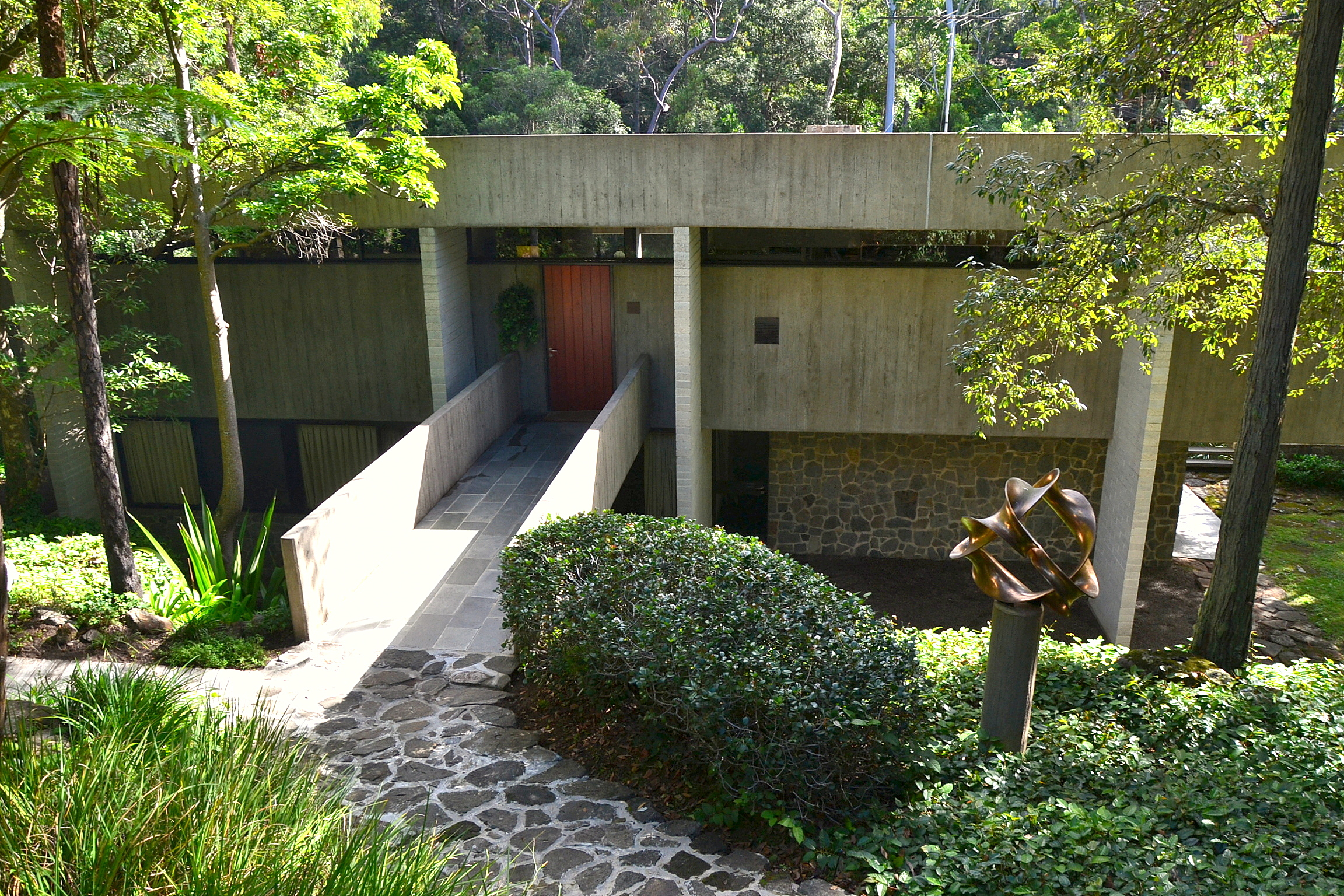
The Seidlers' home in Killara

Penelope Alice Marjorie Seidler AO (née Evatt; born 1938) is an Australian architect and accountant. She is director of the Sydney based architectural firm Harry Seidler & Associates. She was the wife and professional partner of architect Harry Seidler (1923–2006). Together they designed Harry and Penelope Seidler House, which won the Wilkinson Award in 1967.

She has long been a patron of the arts, and as of April 2024 she is a member of the National Gallery of Australia Foundation Board.

== Early life and education ==
Penelope Alice Marjorie Evatt was born in 1938 grew up in Wahroonga, New South Wales, daughter of Clive Evatt (1900–1984), a prominent barrister and NSW Labor politician (MLA for Hurstville 1939–1959), and his wife Marjorie Hanna Evatt (née Andreas) (1903–1984), with two siblings, Elizabeth Evatt and Clive Evatt Jr. Evatt House at 69 Junction Road, Wahroonga is listed on the NSW State Heritage Register.

== Personal life ==
Penelope Evatt met Harry Seidler in 1957 at a fellow architect's drinks in North Sydney. They married on 15 December 1958, and had two children. Together they lived in Point Piper, in a basement apartment on the water for just over one year, afterwards they moved to Ithaca Gardens, Elizabeth Bay, a newly-completed Seidler apartment building, and lived there from January 1960 until late June 1967, before moving to the Harry and Penelope Seidler House, designed by her and her husband, located in Kalang Avenue, Killara on Sydney's North Shore.

== Career and education ==
Seidler is the director of Sydney-based architectural firm Harry Seidler & Associates.

She studied at the University of Sydney, first enrolling in philosophy, history and anthropology before changing to architecture. On completion of a Bachelor of Architecture she registered as an architect in 1964. She joined Seidler & Associates that year as architect and financial manager. She is also a qualified accountant. Penelope Seidler has been a Fellow of the Australian Institute of Architects since 1983, sitting on the NSW executive council from 1982 to 1984. In 2021, she was awarded an Honorary doctorate by the University of Sydney.

She was a founding member of Chief Executive Women (NSW) from 1990 to 2005.

She was on the University of New South Wales' Faculty of the Built Environment advisory council.

== Art patron and collector ==
Seidler has sat on the International Council of the Museum of Modern Art in New York since 1973, has been a Biennale of Sydney director since late 2010, and was deputy commissioner for the Australian Pavilion at the 2013 Venice Biennale. She was an International Advisory Board member of Vienna's Austrian Museum of Applied Arts/Contemporary Art, and is a former council member of the Australiana Fund.

She is a former member of National Gallery of Australia Council, and as of April 2024 still a member of the NGA Foundation Board.

In 1971 Seidler joined the Art Gallery of NSW Society's council, being one of the first "volunteer guides".

In 1973, Seidler received an offer letter from New York's Museum of Modern Art requesting her to be one of the members of its International Council.

=== Penelope Professorship ===
In 2018 Seidler made a gift to the University of Sydney to establish the Penelope Visiting Professorship in Architectural History. The inaugural Penelope Professor was the French architectural historian Jean-Louis Cohen who spoke on the theme of "Frottage City". Penelope professors have included:

- 2021-22: Jean-Louis Cohen.
- 2023: No appointment.
- 2024-25: Claire Zimmerman.

== Recognition and awards ==
- 1967: The house she designed with her husband at Killara in Sydney, known as the "Harry & Penelope Seidler House", won the Royal Australian Institute of Architects' (NSW Chapter) Wilkinson Award
- 2008: Member of the Order of Australia for her work in the visual arts and architecture
- 2011: Chevalier of the Légion d'honneur
- 2011: Honorary Doctor of Letters, University of New South Wales
- 2014: Subject of the 2014 Archibald prize winning portrait by Fiona Lowry
- 2017: University of Sydney Alumni Award, for Cultural Contribution
- 2021: Honorary Doctor of Architecture, University of Sydney
- 2026: Officer of the Order of Australia for "distinguished service to the visual arts as an administrator, patron and benefactor, to heritage preservation, to conservation, and to architecture"
