= Qasımalılar =

- Municipality
- Location within Azerbaijan
- Coordinates: 40°47′19″N 45°56′30″E
- Country: Azerbaijan
- Rayon: Shamkir

Population
  - Total: 855
- Time zone: UTC+4 (AZT)
  - Summer (DST): UTC+5 (AZT)

Qasımalılar is a village and municipality in the Shamkir Rayon of Azerbaijan. It has a population of 855. The municipality consists of the villages of Qasımalılar and Göyməmmədli.
