= Harry Seidler =

Austrian-Australian architect (1923–2006)

Harry Seidler AC OBE
- Born: 25 June 1923; Vienna, Austria
- Died: 9 March 2006 (aged 82); Sydney, Australia
- Education: Cambridgeshire Technical School, University of Manitoba, Harvard Graduate School of Design
- Occupation: Architect
- Partner: Penelope Seidler AO
- Awards: Australian Institute of Architects Gold Medal 1976; RIBA Royal Gold Medal 1996; Sir John Sulman Medal 1951, 1967, 1981, 1983, 1991; Wilkinson Award 1965, 1966, 1967, 1999; National Award for Enduring Architecture 2012
- Practice: Harry Seidler and Associates
- Buildings: Rose Seidler House, Blues Point Tower, Australia Square, MLC Centre, Embassy of Australia, Paris, Riverside Centre, Brisbane, Grosvenor Place

Harry Seidler (25 June 1923 – 9 March 2006) was an Austrian-born Australian architect who is considered to be one of the leading exponents of Modernism's methodology in Australia and the first architect to fully express the principles of the Bauhaus in Australia.

Seidler designed about 119 buildings (96 of which were in his home state of New South Wales) but some have since been demolished or altered in a non-Seidler manner, and he received much recognition for his contribution to the architecture of Australia. Seidler consistently won architectural awards every decade throughout his Australian career of almost 58 years across the varied categories – his residential work from 1950, his commercial work from 1964, and his public commissions from the 1970s. He was a controversial figure throughout his long career as he regularly publicly criticised planning authorities and the planning system in Sydney.

== Early life ==
Seidler was born in Vienna, Austria, the son of a Jewish clothing manufacturer. Soon after Nazi Germany annexed Austria in 1938, his older brother Marcell, who was already in England, obtained a visa for Harry to join him as a student in Cambridge.

== Architecture education ==
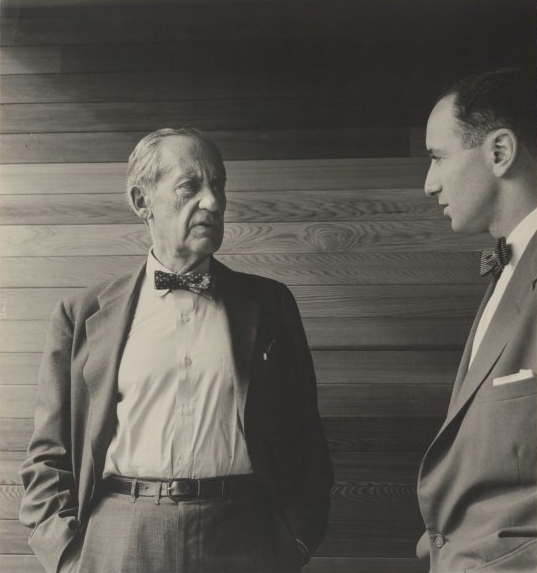
Harry Seidler (right) with Walter Gropius in Sydney 1954

In England, he studied building and construction at Cambridgeshire Technical School. Even though he was categorised by British wartime tribunal as a "Category C – no risk" refugee fleeing the Nazis, because he was born in Austria, on 12 May 1940, he was interned by the British authorities as an enemy alien, where he was in internment camps first at Huyton near Liverpool, then on the Isle of Man before being shipped to Quebec, Canada and continued to be interned until October 1941, when he was released on probational release from internment to study architecture at the University of Manitoba in Winnipeg, where he graduated with first class honours in 1944.

After working briefly for an architectural firm in Toronto, Seidler (at the age of 21) became a registered architect in Ontario, in February 1945.

Although he was ten years old when the Bauhaus was closed, Seidler's analysts invariably associate him with the Bauhaus because he later studied under emigrant Bauhaus teachers in the USA. He attended Harvard Graduate School of Design under Walter Gropius and Marcel Breuer on a scholarship in 1945/46, and during the university winter (Christmas) inter-semester approximate four weeks break Seidler worked with Alvar Aalto in Boston drawing up plans for the Baker dormitory at the Massachusetts Institute of Technology. He then studied visual aesthetics at Black Mountain College under the painter Josef Albers in mid 1946 for the US summer.

== Early career outside Australia ==
Seidler worked as the first ever assistant to modernist architect Marcel Breuer in New York from late 1946 until March 1948. Seidler also worked in Rio de Janeiro with the architect Oscar Niemeyer for almost two months from shortly after 20 April to early June 1948.

== Life in Australia ==
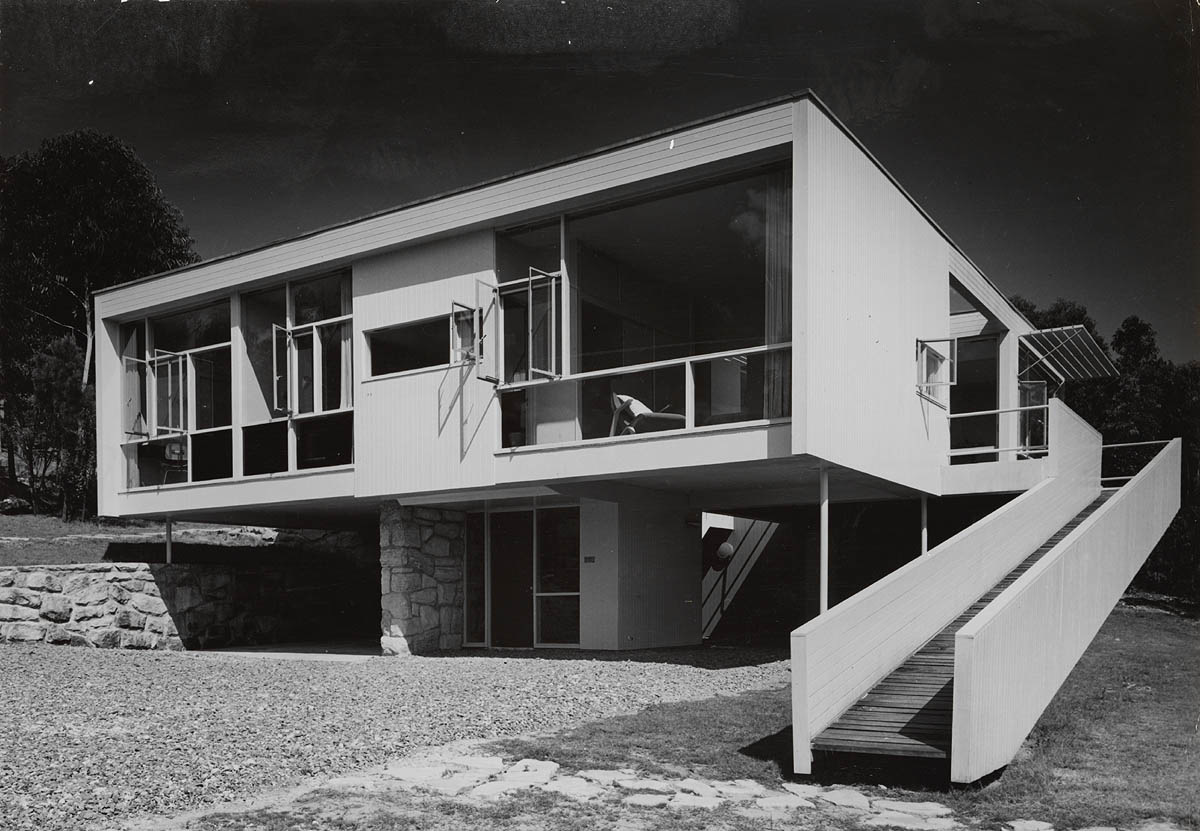
Rose Seidler House, Wahroonga

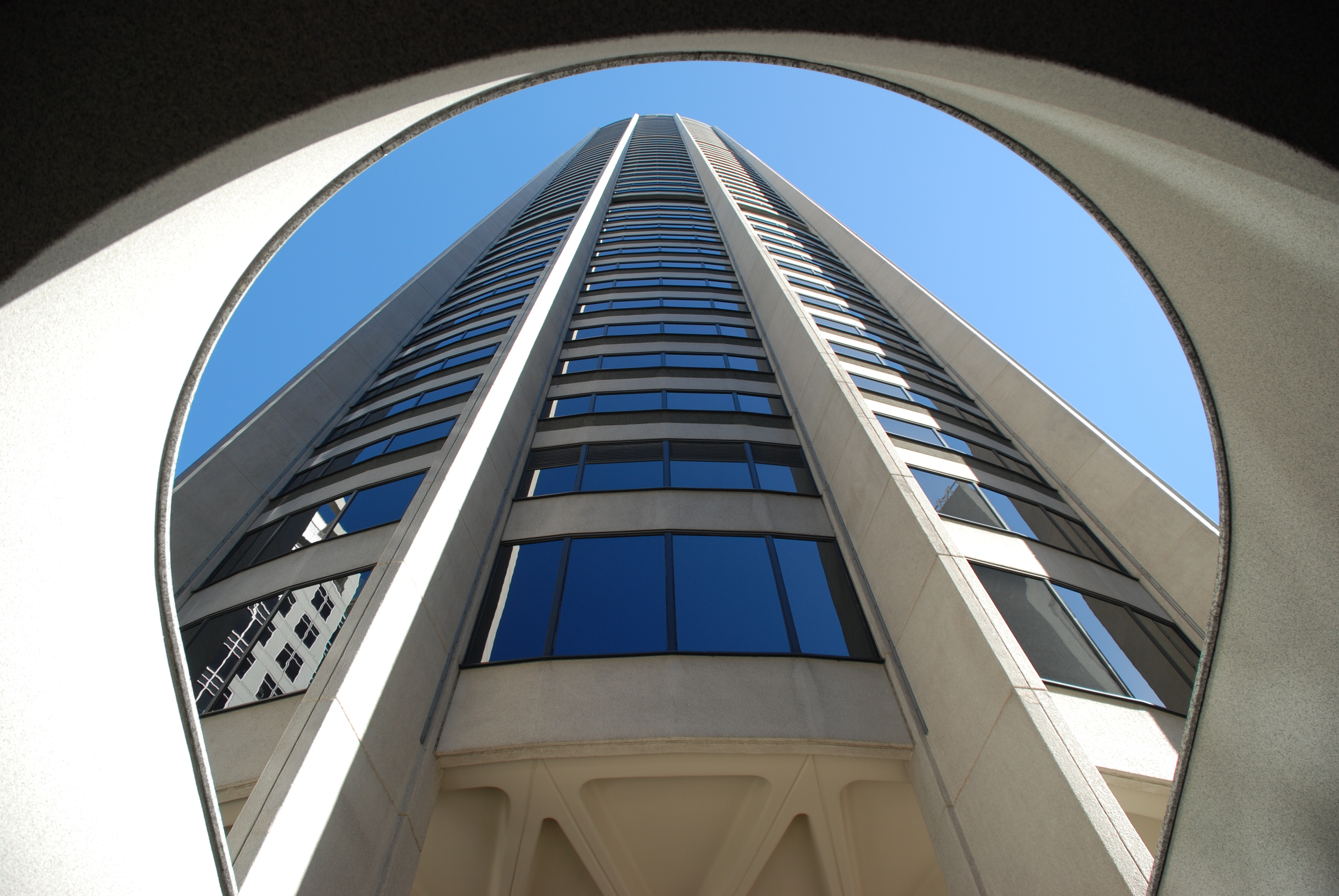
Australia Square

Seidler's parents migrated to Sydney, Australia in 1946, and (while he was working for Breuer in New York) in late 1947 or early 1948, his mother wrote to him to commission him to come to Sydney to design their home. Seidler arrived in Sydney on (likely) 20 June 1948 (which was a few days before his 25th birthday), with no intention to remain in Australia, but to stay only until the house was finished. The house became known as the Rose Seidler House in Wahroonga, in remote bushland of a suburb on Sydney's Upper North Shore. This project was the first completely modern domestic residence to fully express the philosophy and visual language of the Bauhaus in Australia and won the Sulman Award of 1951. From the huge publicity of this house, others approached Seidler to design their homes. With so many clients and his enjoyment of the Sydney climate and harbour views, Seidler decided to stay in Australia. The Rose Seidler House became a house-museum in 1991.

In 1952, Seidler successfully appealed against Ku-ring-gai Council's refusal to approve his design of a glass house in Roseville.

In the 1960s Seidler again broke new ground with his design for the Australia Square project (first designs 1961, plaza building 1962–64, tower 1964–67). At the time, the Australia Square tower was the world's tallest light weight concrete building. The design introduced the concept of a large public open plaza and prominent artworks to office towers in Australia.

In 1961, Seidler called for the Queen Victoria Building to be demolished, stating "It is an architectural monstrosity, a wasteful, stupid building". In 1966, he helped lead the protests to try to keep Jørn Utzon as the principal architect of the Sydney Opera House.

He was a founding member of the Australian Architecture Association. In 1984 he became the first Australian to be elected a member of the Académie d'architecture, Paris and in 1987 was made a Companion of the Order of Australia, an honour which he accepted in his trademark suit and bowtie. Over the years Mr Seidler was also awarded five Sulman Medals by the Royal Australian Institute of Architects, as well as the Royal Australian Institute of Architects Gold Medal in 1976, and the Royal Gold Medal by the Royal Institute of British Architects in 1996.

For 50 years Harry Seidler has played a vital role in international architecture. His work is widely recognised as an original and intensely creative contribution to the architecture of the second half of the 20th century.

— Dennis Sharp in his introduction to the book Master architects: Harry Seidler

== Personal life ==
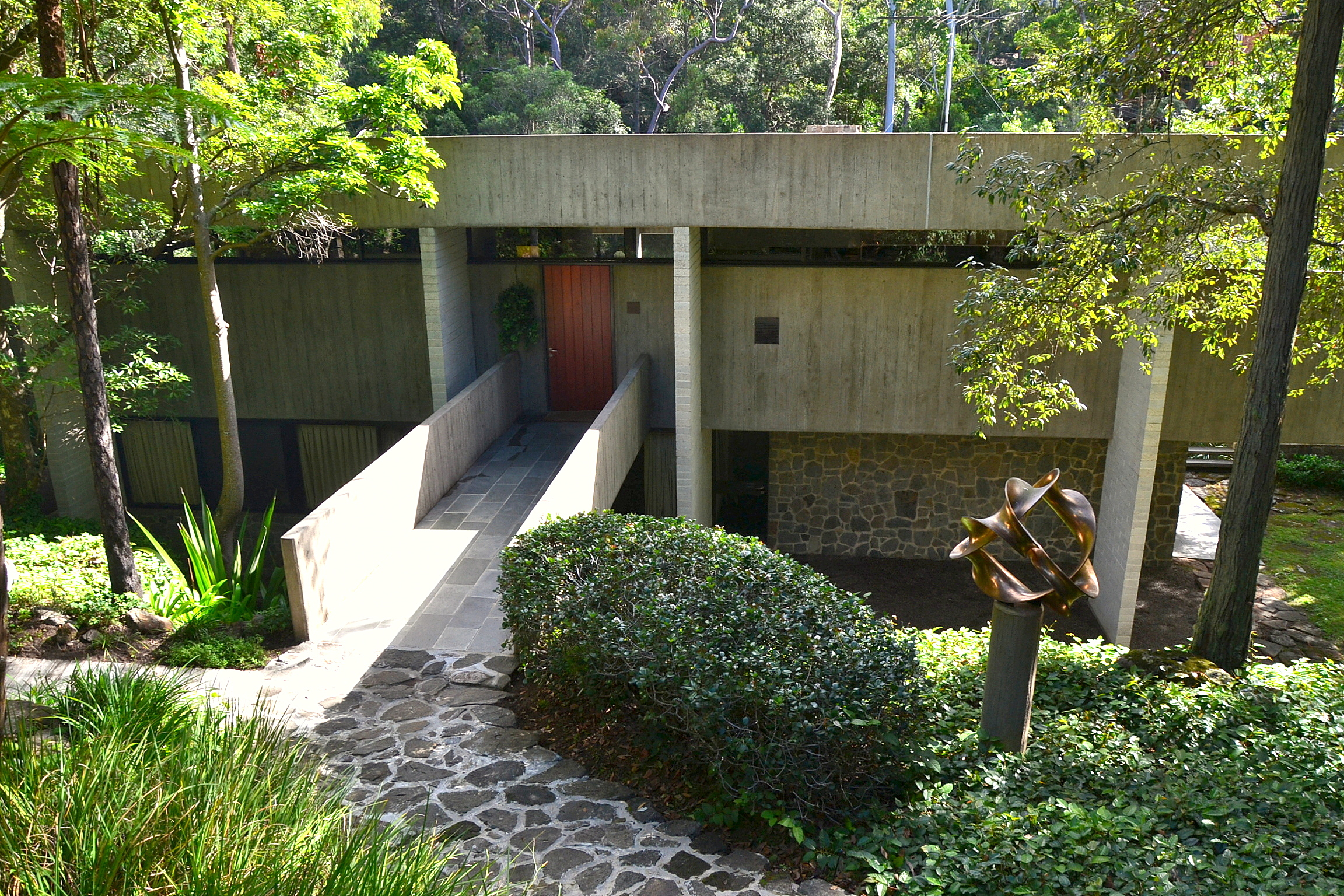
Seidler's home in Killara

=== Citizenship ===
Harry Seidler became a Canadian citizen when he was studying in the US in late 1945. He travelled to Australia in 1948 on his Canadian passport (which he collected in mid–1946). By 1958, he had lived in Australia for ten years, and then sought to renew his Canadian passport but was unable to do so because he had been a naturalised Canadian who had not lived in Canada for more than three years). He became an Australian citizen in late 1958 so he would have a passport to travel for work and his honeymoon.

=== Partnership with Penelope Seidler ===
Harry Seidler married Penelope Evatt, daughter of Clive Evatt on 15 December 1958; they had two children.

Penelope Seidler, herself an architect, gained her Bachelor of Architecture from the University of Sydney and joined Seidler and Associates in 1964 as architect and financial manager. She co-designed the Harry and Penelope Seidler House in Killara which won the Wilkinson Award in 1967.

=== Interests ===
Seidler enjoyed photographing architecture around the world and some of these are documented in his photography book The Grand Tour. He also enjoyed skiing.

=== Death ===
On 24 April 2005, Seidler suffered a stroke from which he never fully recovered, and died from septicaemia in Sydney on 9 March 2006 at age 82.

== Modernism and principles of design ==
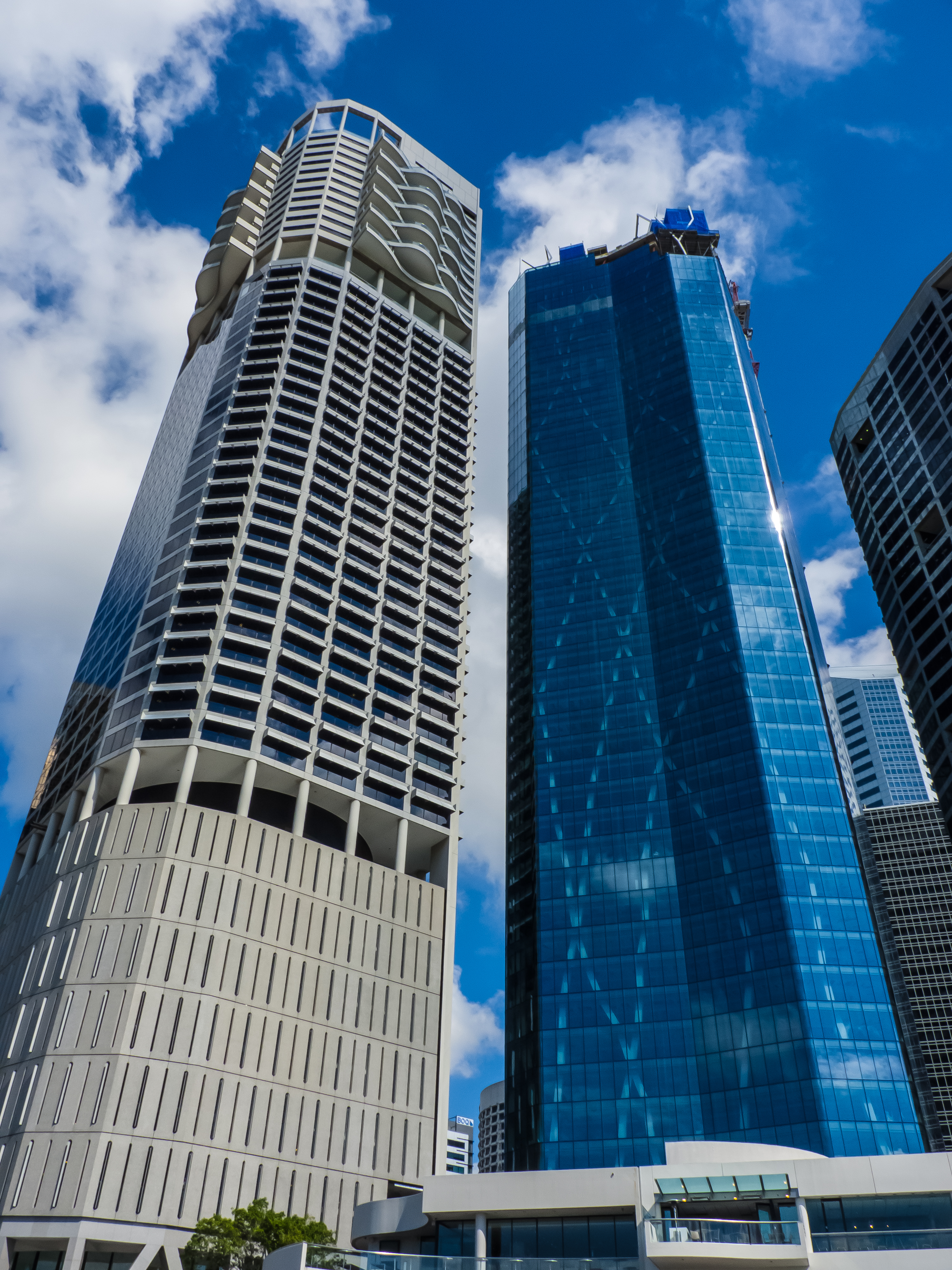
Riparian Plaza, 71 Eagle Street, Brisbane

Seidler said the term "International Style" was a misnomer and so he objected to the term being used to describe modern architecture or his own architectural designs – as both changed over time as social use and building technology developed. Seidler insisted that Modernism was not a style but was in constant flux. Seidler would explain that Le Corbusier's 1920s modern architecture had columns placed 6 metres apart, whereas by mid-1980s pre-stressed concrete technology allowed 34 metre column-free space, resulting in different visual expression and openness in architecture.

Seidler's work shows a mix of influences from four great modern masters under whom he studied or worked with: Walter Gropius, Marcel Breuer, (artist) Josef Albers and Oscar Niemeyer. Seidler maintained relationships with his four mentors even after he came to Australia. Seidler was instrumental in having Walter Gropius address the RAIA Convention in Sydney in 1954. Seidler collaborated with Marcel Breuer for the Australian Embassy in Paris (as Breuer had a Paris office) and Seidler was Breuer's project architect for the Torin Factory in Penrith NSW in the 1970s. Seidler commissioned Josef Albers artworks for the MLC Centre in the mid-1970s. Seidler also maintained a close friendship with Oscar Niemeyer through letters and visits to Rio de Janeiro.

Gropius' teachings had a big influence on Seidler. Gropius taught that Modernism was not a style but a methodology of approach which will vary according to different regions and climates. Seidler too insisted that Modernism was not a style ""You know there's a great misconception about that modernism is a style. It isn't. It is a methodology of approach, that is in constant flux, constant change." Seidler's designs upheld a Modernist design methodology, which he considered to be an amalgam of three elements: social use, efficient building construction methods and visual aesthetics. As these three elements were in constantly changing, Seidler always insisted that he had no fixed 'style', and so as building technology and social use changed, the visual expression of his designs constantly evolved throughout his 57 years of designing in Australia.

The form of Seidler's work changed as building technology changed: from his timber houses in the 1950s (many of which echoed Breuer's bi-nuclear house form), to reinforced concrete houses and buildings in the 1960–1980s, and the development of curves (in plan shapes) with advances in concrete technology in the 1980s and later, as well as developments in steel technology that allowed for curved roofs in the 1990s onwards (e.g. Berman House). Seidler is on record (in 1980) as stating that Oscar Niemeyer's interior of the Boavista Bank in Rio of 1946 (which Seidler would have seen in 1948) with its interacting curves must have influenced Seidler's use of interacting curves in exterior playground and retainer walls from the mid-1960s and throughout the 1970s. Upon celebrating 50 years of architectural practice in Australia, Seidler noted that developments in building technology allowed for more richness of form in his then soon-to-be completed Horizon apartment tower: "I could not have built Horizon twenty years ago...in earlier building technology (the way one could) span distances, it was very limited. (But Horizon) is made (possible) by devices such as pre-stressed concrete which is ...economic and quick. And that also gives you greater freedom of the shapes that you can use. Nowadays we can span huge distances and to do so (by) not just putting steel mesh or something into the concrete but to put steel, high tensile steel wire into it and pull it tight and that makes it easy to span distances and give this kind of change of shape of a building which would have been very difficult to achieve any other way."

While some commentators label Seidler's use of (unpainted) off-form concrete in the 1960s and 1970s as "brutalist" (from the French 'beton brut'), Seidler disowned the term as he was critical of British Brutalists as "pathetic imitations of Le Corbusier. The heavy monolithic structures of the 'brutalists', were the opposite of Seidler's visual aesthetic of transparency and lightness and being able to look through the architecture through the voids through the various architectural spaces.

In the 1960s and 70s Seidler worked with the Italian structural engineer Pier Luigi Nervi for the design of the Australia Square and MLC Centre office towers, in Sydney, the Edmund Barton Building (formerly called Trade Group Offices) in Canberra, and the Australian Embassy in Paris in the 1970s. the same Nervi- designed T beams were used by Seidler in his own Seidler Office building in Milsons Point (Sydney) completed in 1973. Seidler later worked with Nervi's successor Mario Desideri for the Riverside Centre in Brisbane.

Seidler learnt from Gropius (as one of the 3 required elements of good architecture) to devise efficient "systems" for constructing buildings – other than for individual houses, this involved "making things easy to build in accordance with a system that allows repetition of identical elements". This is why Kenneth Frampton labelled Seidler's non-house designs "isostatic architecture". In the 1970s and 1980s, Seidler used the geometry of the quadrant which connects the straight line to the curve and allowed for structural beams of the same size spanning across the radius of the quadrant. This is seen in Seidler's design for the Australian Embassy in Paris and Karralyka (previously called Ringwood Cultural) Centre.

Seidler saw parallels of good modern architecture with the underlying structural geometry of baroque architecture, especially the designs of Italian architect Francesco Borromini (which was illustrated in the book Space, Time & Architecture by Sigfried Gidieon which Seidler read as an architecture student). Seidler's designs from 1969 onwards often displayed opposing negative and positive quarter-circle curves (e.g. retaining garden walls of Pettit & Sevitt exhibition house, Westleigh, 1969, and Condominium Apartments, Acapulco 1969–70). From the 1980s, Seidler often incorporated plans with flamboyant curves (e.g. Hannes House, Hong Kong Club) and some commentators have labelled this as the start of Seidler's "baroque" period.

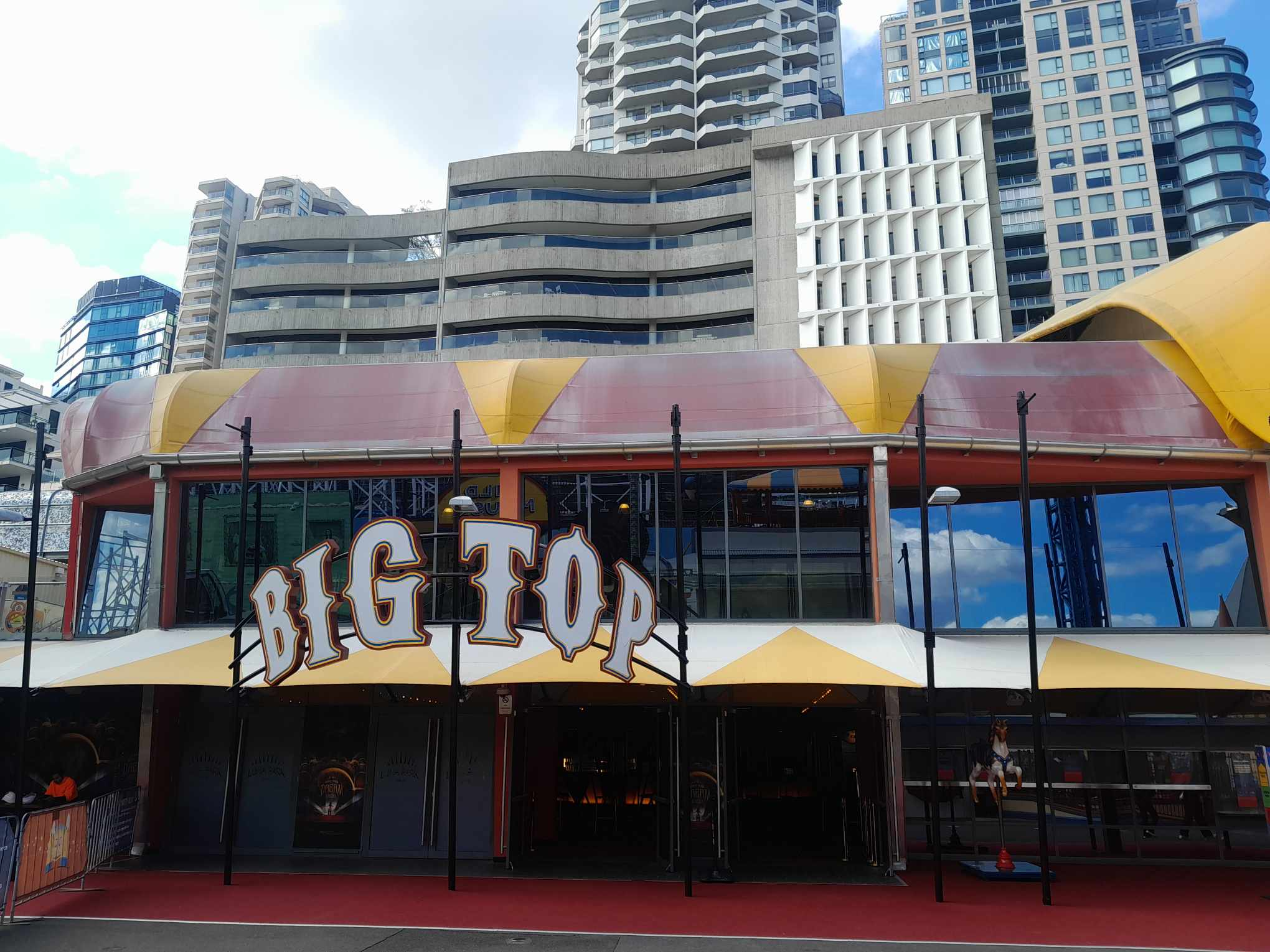
Seidler Offices and Apartments, as seen from Luna Park Sydney. In the 1990s, Seidler was one of several Lavender Bay residents who registered noise complaints about the park.

Seidler's visual approach to two-dimensional and three-dimensional spatial arrangement was consistent throughout his whole career and reflected what Seidler learnt from his visual aesthetics teacher Josef Albers. Seidler stated he learnt more about design from Albers than he did at any architecture school. Albers stated that designs which visually had a high centre of gravity were more dynamic than solid earth bound designs – which is why Seidler used (for non-tower designs) "cantilevered slabs hovering in mid-air which seem to 'negate' the fact that mass is something solid and heavy". Seidler would claim "aesthetically we want dematerialisation". Seidler, following Albers, also shunned traditional symmetry or grid-like modern designs as static (and thus dull), instead Seidler "offset" opposing elements to create "scintillation" and "visual tension" to be more visually dynamic and thus interesting to the eye. which is seen in the window pattern of Seidler's Blues Point Tower (1958–62) and three-dimensionally in the syncopated balcony arrangement of this Horizon Tower (1995–98).

Seidler articulated the visual-spatial design principle of modern architecture being "dissolution of conventional solidity" and inter-connecting spatial vistas. Seidler said the visual essence of modern architecture was "not the ponderous solidity of traditional architecture where everything was built to four walls around a room and spaces that were finite. But rather our eyes seek transparency, lightness... being able to look through things". He said of his first work, the Rose Seidler House. "This house explodes the surfaces that enclose a normal house or space, and turns it into a continuum of free standing planes, through which the eye can never see an end, you are always intrigued what's beyond, you can always see something floating into the distance, there is never an obstruction to your vision, it is a continuum (of space), that I believe 20th century man's eye and senses responds positively to that, we crave this". Again referring to Rose Seidler House plan, "(there are) planes of interacting solid walls and glass walls – solids and voids follow each other around, generating flows of space between them". Seidler also explains same principle for three-dimensional spatial arrangement as highly influenced by Theo van Doesburg's painting Space-time construction #3 (1923) in which there is an interpenetration of space and spatial flow between hovering planes which creates "an openness which is so much more subtle than it is when it's totally open and which is so often done" "Architecture in recent times has been immensely concerned about this idiom of the exploitation of the interior space which involves this simultaneous viewing of things, the channeling of vistas between its elements. ... As Le Corbusier has said, 'Instead of the eye and the mind being abruptly halted by edges and containing surfaces, as had been the case in the past, they are now laid continuously on an exploration, never quite comprehending the mystery of layered and veiled space'." Seidler says of the design for his Gissing House: "in three dimensions, the fact that the eye is always tempted to look beyond and never quite experiencing it all. There is a temptation with the seeing of things that are not entirely apparent, the tantalising sense of the beyond which you in fact are denied and which entices a person to move through and try and explore an interior."

In 1991, Seidler acknowledged that his first house (Rose Seidler House) which was built of timber, despite the north facing sunshades "is generally too vulnerable to temperature changes...I didn't fully appreciate the intensity of the Australian sun". Thus, later in his career, he sought to use more thermally stable materials like reinforced concrete and to respond to the Australian climate by the extensive use of sunshades and flamboyantly-shaped rain protecting canopies on his skyscrapers, (such as Grosvenor Place, Riverside Centre, and QV1), large covered balconies in his houses, as well as shaping his designs to maximize views and enjoyment of the outdoors from inside.

== Collaboration with visual artists ==
Seidler was a frequent and enthusiastic collaborator with visual artists in the creation of his buildings. While his artist collaborators include famous or notable figures such as Alexander Calder, Frank Stella, Lin Utzon, Norman Carlberg, Charles O. Perry (the last two were fellow but later student of Josef Albers), Helen Frankenthaler, Sol LeWitt and many others, by far the most important of the collaborators was his mentor Albers. Seidler included works by Albers – perhaps the single person most influential on his design philosophy – in a number of projects (notably the MLC Centre with 'Homage to the Square' (later repurchased by the Albers Foundation, and Albers' last commissioned-design 'Wrestling' on the eastern side of MLC Plaza). Seidler also arranged in 1966 for the Australia Square tower ground lobby to display tapestries by Le Corbusier and Victor Vasarely – these were replaced in late 2003 by the Sol LeWitt mural. Seidler also selected and paid for Australian artworks to be shipped in 1977 to be ready to be displayed for the opening of the Australian Embassy in Paris in early 1978. As Paul Bartizan indicates in his obituary tribute to Seidler, these works of art were not mere 'plop art'; they were really planned to be integrated with and complementary to the buildings into which they were placed: "In many of his projects, Seidler worked with artists whose works became an intrinsic component of his designs."

== List of buildings ==
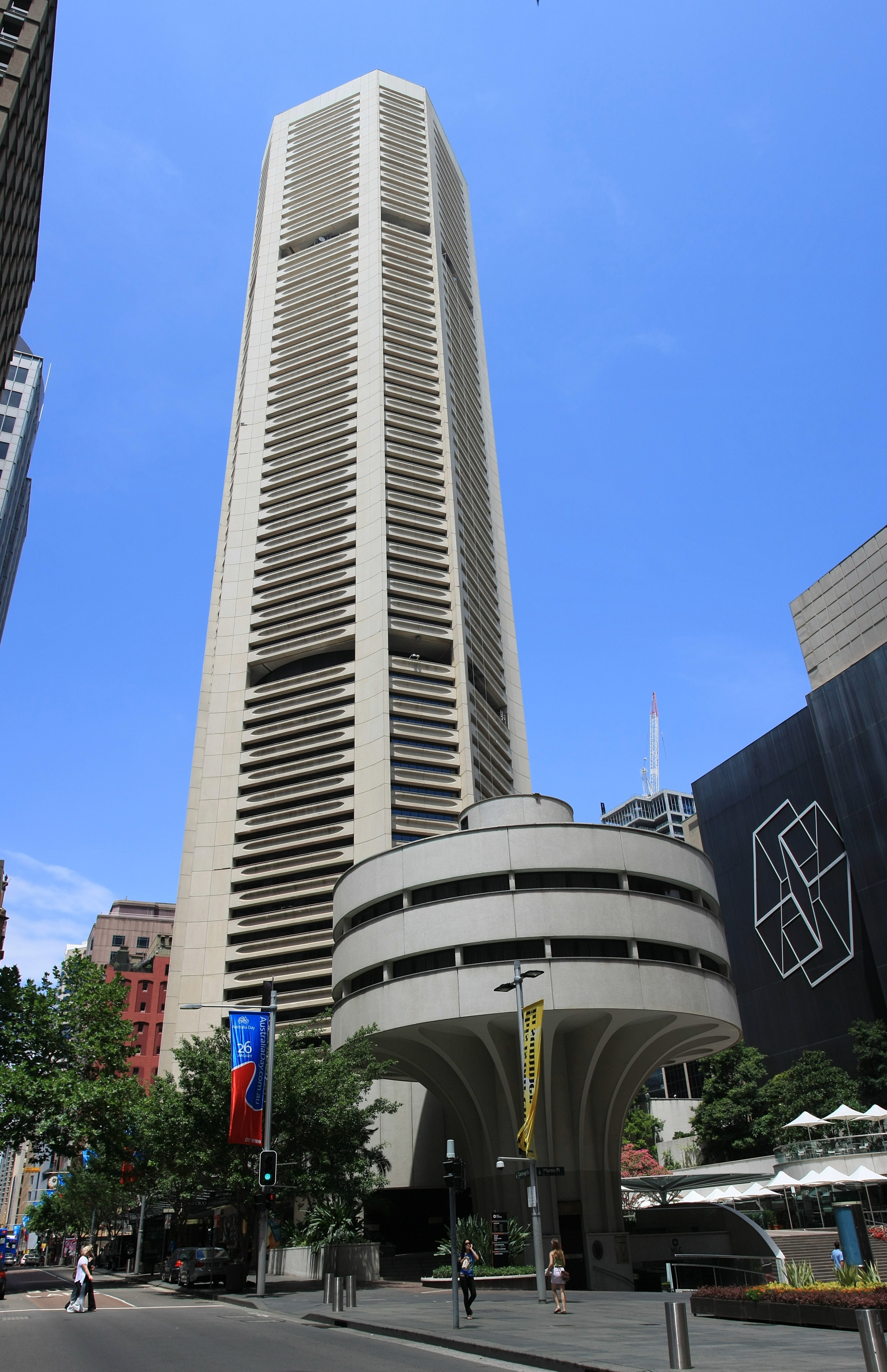
MLC Centre, Sydney

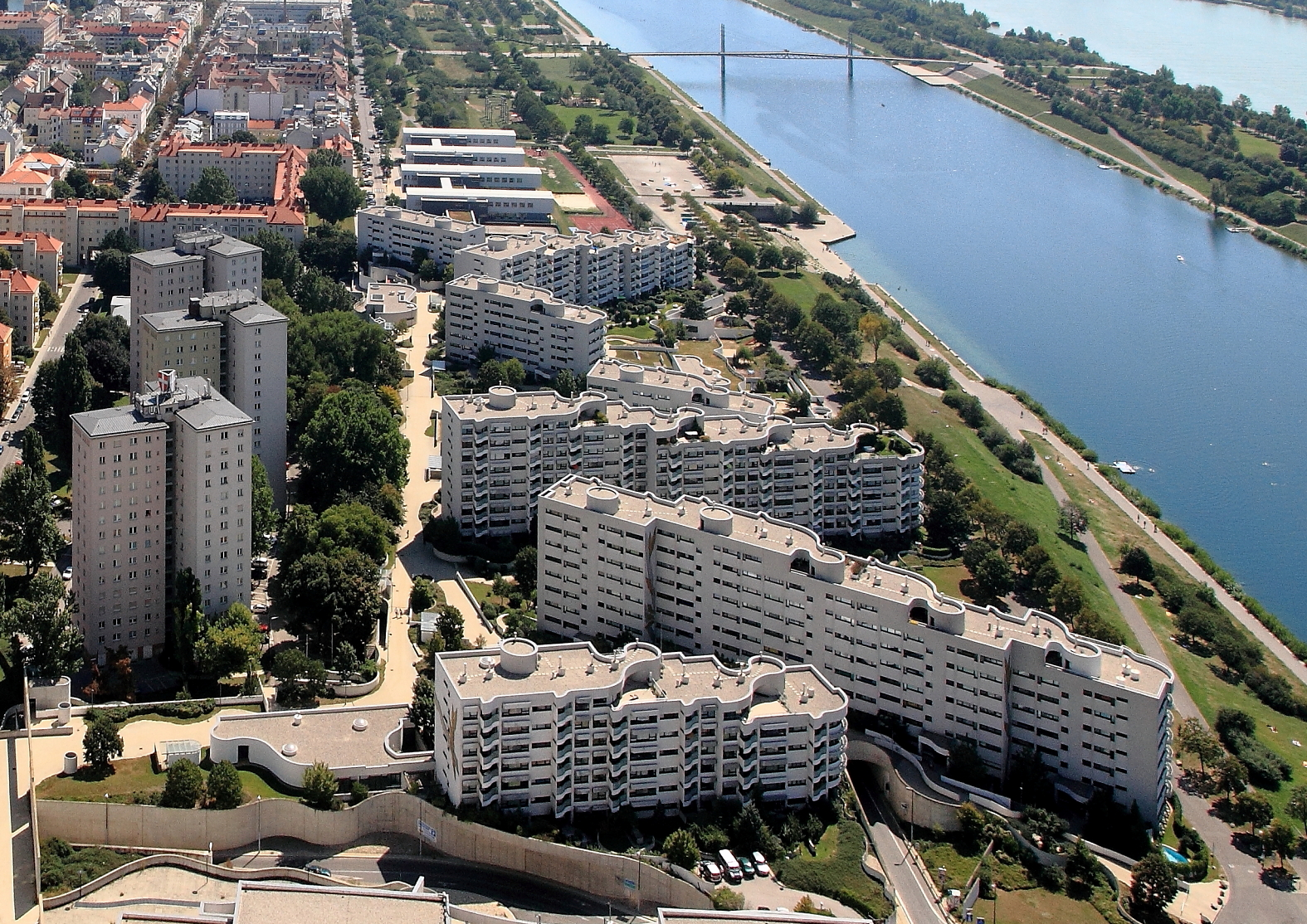
Wohnpark-Neue-Donau, Vienna

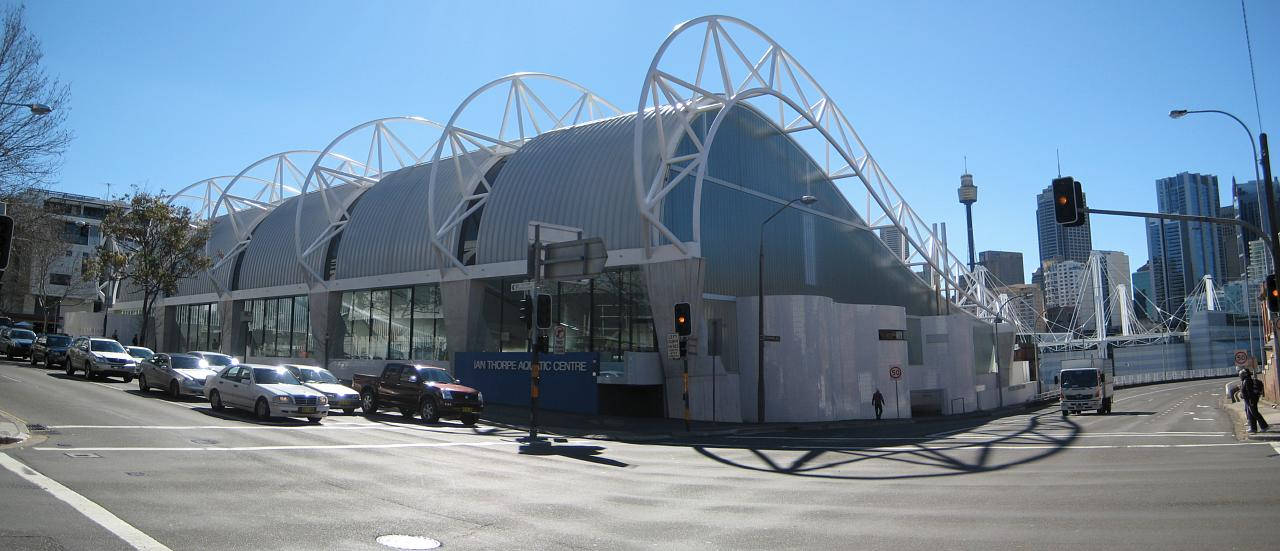
Ian Thorpe Aquatic Centre

- 1948–50: Rose Seidler House, Wahroonga (Sydney)
- 1949–54 Julian Rose House, Wahroonga (Sydney)
- 1951–53: Marcus Seidler House, Wahroonga (Sydney)
- 1950: Meller House, Castlecrag (Sydney)
- 1952–54: Hutter House, Turramurra (Sydney), since greatly modified such that hardly anything of Seidler's design remains.
- 1952–54: Igloo House, also known as the Williamson House, Mosman (Sydney)
- 1952–54 Thurlow House, Blakehurst (Sydney)
- 1954 Bowden House, Deakin (Canberra)
- 1957: Glass House, Chatswood (Sydney)
- 1959: Canberra South Bowling Club, Griffith (Canberra) – (since demolished)
- 1960: Ithaca Gardens, Elizabeth Bay (Sydney)
- 1961: Grimson & Rose Exhibition House, Pennant Hills (Sydney) – (since demolished)
- 1958–61: Blues Point Tower, Blues Point Road, McMahons Point (Sydney)
- 1961: Wood House, Penrith (Sydney) – since mostly demolished and greatly altered
- 1961–67: Australia Square Tower, Sydney
- 1962: Ski Lodge, Thredbo
- 1963: Muller House, Port Hacking (Sydney)
- 1963–65: Rushcutters Bay Apartments (later called "Aquarius", Rushcutters Bay (Sydney)
- 1964–67: Rosebery Apartments NSW Department of Housing, Maloney Street, Eastlakes (Sydney)
- 1964–68: Garran Group Housing, Canberra – (since demolished)
- 1965: Ercildoune, 85 Elizabeth Bay Road
- 1965–68: Campbell Group Housing, Canberra – (since repainted alternating black and white)
- 1965–66: Links View Apartments, Earlwood (Sydney)
- 1965–66: Arlington Apartments, Edgecliff (Sydney)
- 1966–67: Harry and Penelope Seidler House, Killara (Sydney)
- 1968: International Lodge, Elizabeth Bay (Sydney)
- 1969–70: Condominium Apartments, Acapulco, Mexico
- 1970–74: Edmund Barton Building (formerly Trade Group Offices), Canberra
- 1971–72: Gissing House, Wahroonga (Sydney)
- 1971–72: Offices, 41 McLaren Street, North Sydney (Sydney)
- 1972–75: MLC Centre, Sydney
- 1973–77: Embassy of Australia, Paris, France
- 1973–94: Harry Seidler Offices and Apartments, Milsons Point (Sydney)
- 1978–80: Karralyka Centre (formerly Ringwood Cultural Centre) (many non-Seidler alterations), Ringwood (Melbourne)
- 1978–82: 72 Apartments, Broadbeach (Gold Coast) – (now called Broadbeach Waters)
- 1979–82: Hillside Housing, Augusta Village, Kooralbyn, Queensland.
- 1980–84: Hong Kong Club Building, Hong Kong Central
- 1981–83: Merson House,Palm Beach (Sydney)
- 1982–84: City of Monash (formerly Waverley Civic Centre), Glen Waverley (Melbourne)
- 1982–84: Lakeview Townhouses (formerly 'Yarralumla Group Houses') Yarralumla (Canberra)
- 1982–88: Grosvenor Place, Sydney
- 1983–84: Hannes House, Cammeray (Sydney)
- 1983–86: Riverside Centre, Brisbane
- 1984–89: 9 Castlereagh Street (formerly Capita Centre), Sydney
- 1985: Garden Island Dockyard Workshop, Garden Island (Sydney)
- 1985–89: 1 Spring Street (formerly Shell House), Melbourne
- 1987: Hilton Hotel, Elizabeth Street, Brisbane
- 1987–91: QV1, Perth
- 1989–91: Hamilton House, Vaucluse (Sydney)
- 1990: Monash Gallery of Art (with non-Seidler additions), Wheelers Hill (outer Melbourne)
- 1990–98: Horizon Apartments (originally published as ABC Apartments), Darlinghurst (Sydney)
- 1993–98: Wohnpark Neue Donau, Vienna, Austria
- 1994–95: Meares House, Birchgrove (Sydney)
- 1995–96: Gilhotra House, Hunters Hill (Sydney)
- 1995–00: Grollo Tower project, Melbourne (never built)
- 1996–98: Elizabeth Street Offices, Surry Hills (Sydney) – occupied by the Australia Council
- 1996–99: Berman House, (originally published as "House in Southern Highlands", from 2010 marketed by new owner for accommodation as "Seidler House") Joadja
- 1996–02: Hochhaus Neue Donau, Vienna, Austria
- 1999–04 Cove Apartments, Sydney
- 1999–05: Riparian Plaza, Brisbane
- 1999–00: ARCA Showroom, Perth
- 2001–06: Meriton Tower, Sydney
- 2001–03: North Apartments, Sydney
- 2001–07: Ian Thorpe Aquatic Centre, Ultimo, Sydney
- 2004–09: Waves on Hamilton, townhouses, Hamilton Island
- 2004–09: Alliance Française Building, Sydney – (his last commercial and public design)

=== List of unbuilt buildings ===
- 1974-1976: Tuggeranong 2 (and district energy station)

== Honours ==
- 1951, 1968, 1981, 1983, 1991 RAIA Sir John Sulman Medal, NSW Chapter
- 1965, 1966, 1967, 1999 RAIA Wilkinson Award, NSW Chapter
- 1966 Honorary Fellowship from the American Institute of Architects (AIA)
- 1967 RAIA Civic Design Award, NSW, Australia Square, Sydney
- 1968 Pan Pacific Citation of the American Institute of Architects (AIA)
- 1976 RAIA Gold Medal from the Royal Australian Institute of Architects
- 1984 Member of the Académie d'architecture, Paris
- 1984 Honorary Member of the Society of Graphic Artists of Austria (Künstlerhaus)
- 1985, 1987, 1989, 1991, 1992, 2001 various honours of the Royal Australian Institute of Architects (RAIA)
- 1985 Honorary Citizenship of Austria
- 1987 Companion of the Order of Australia (AC) (Australia's highest honour)
- 1990 Gold Medal City of Vienna
- 1992 Officer of the Order of the British Empire
- 1996 Royal Gold Medal of the Royal Institute of British Architects (RIBA)
- 1996 Austrian Decoration for Science and Art
- 2002 Golden Badge of Honour for Merits for Vienna
- 2004 Honour for International Highrises of the city of Frankfurt for 'Cove Apartments', Sydney
- 2010 New South Wales Enduring Architecture Award, Glen Street Offices, Milsons Point, Sydney
- 2011 Robin Gibson Award for Enduring Architecture, Riverside Centre, Brisbane
- 2012 New South Wales Enduring Architecture Award, Australia Square, Sydney
- 2012 National Award for Enduring Architecture, Australia Square, Sydney
- 2019 Richard Roach Jewell Award for Enduring Architecture, QV1, Perth

== Gallery ==
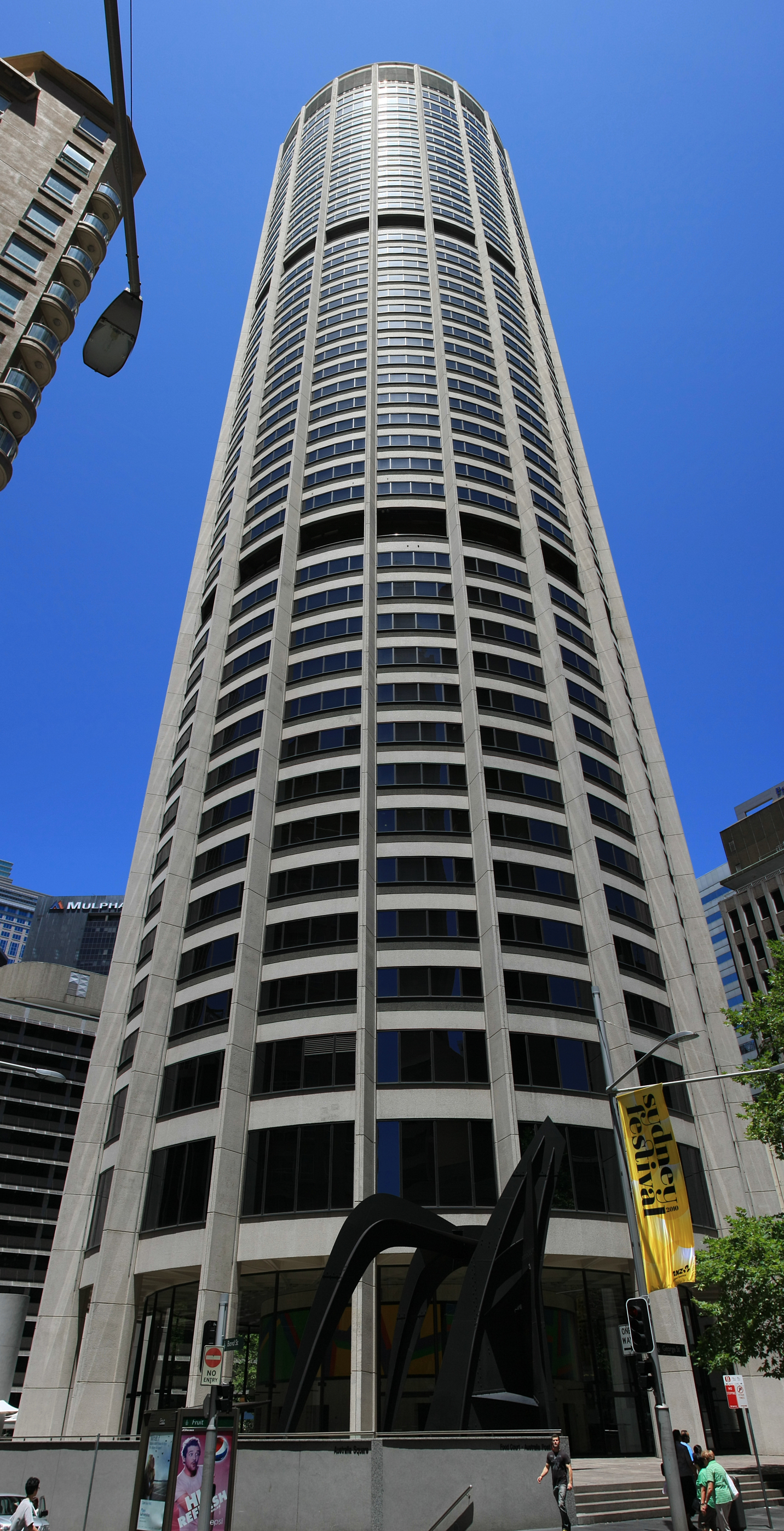
Australia Square, Sydney

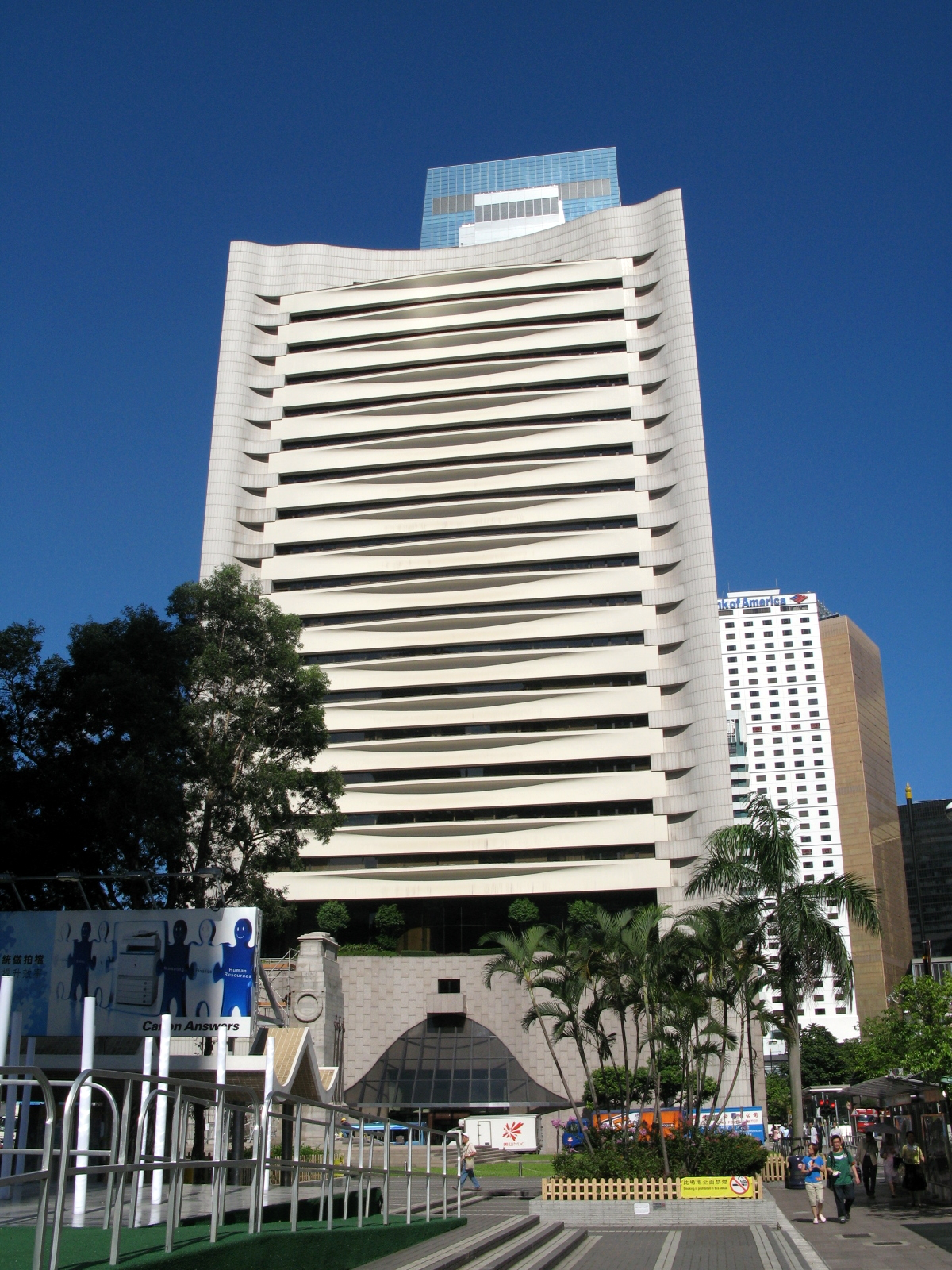
Hong Kong Club Building, Hong Kong

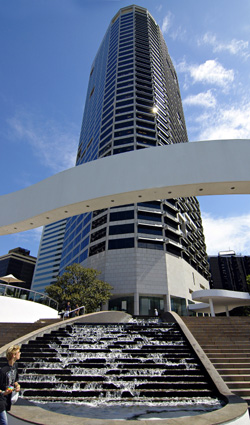
Riverside Centre, Brisbane

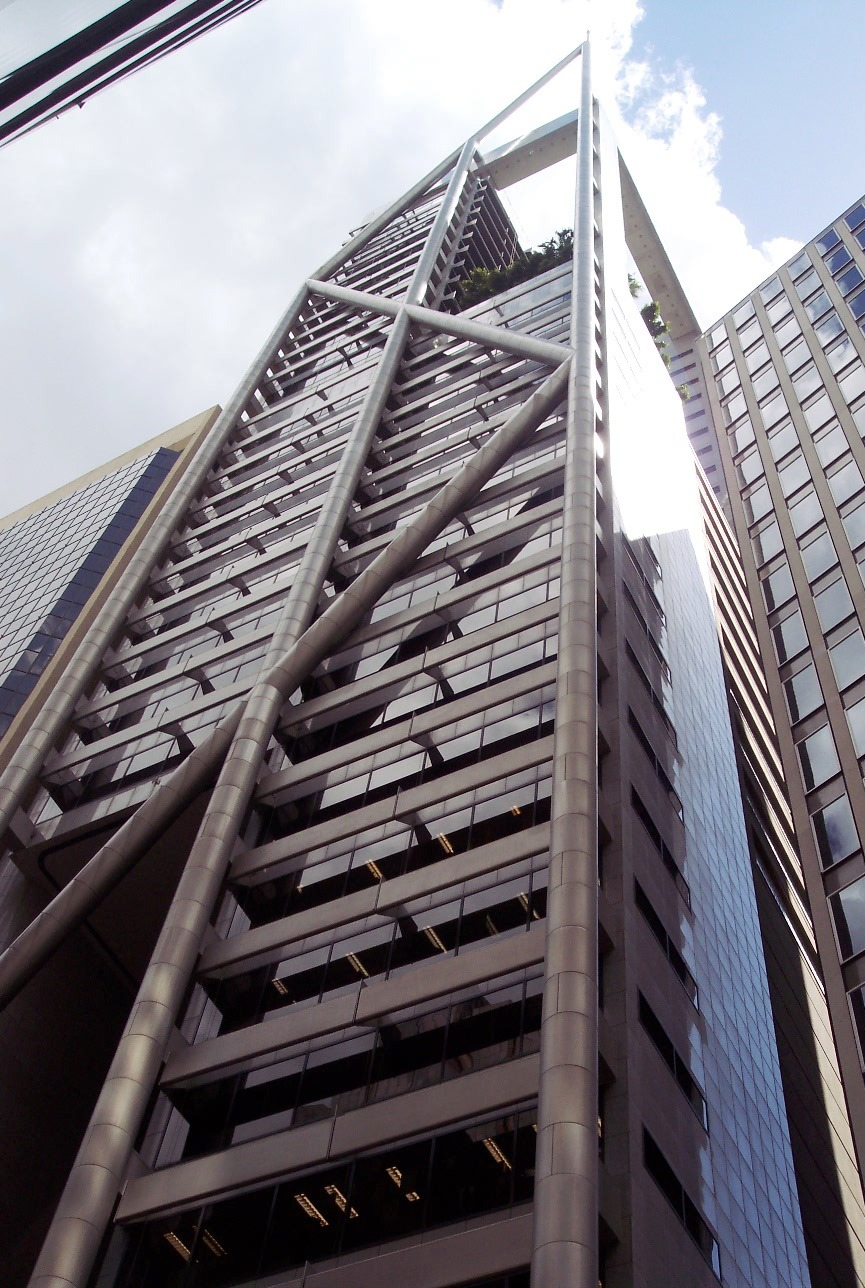
9& Castlereagh Sreett (formerly Capita Centre), Sydney (1984–89)

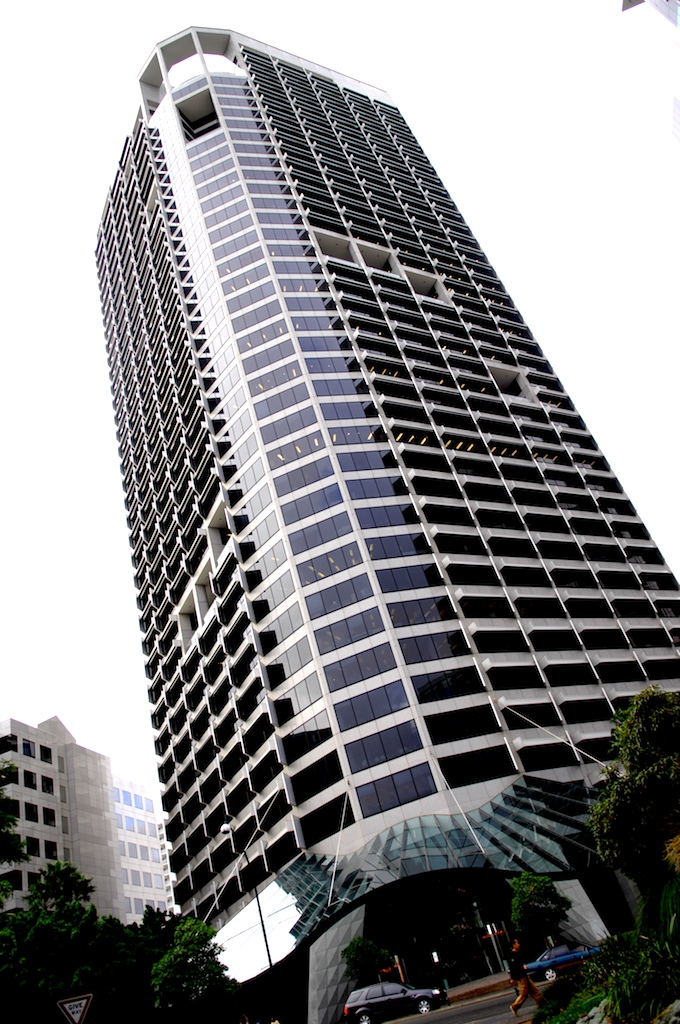
QV1, Perth

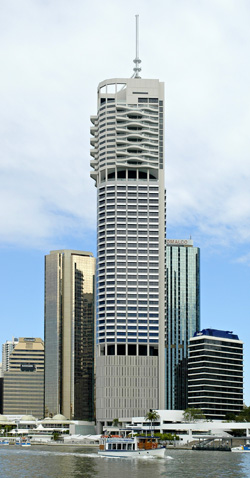
Riparian Plaza, Brisbane

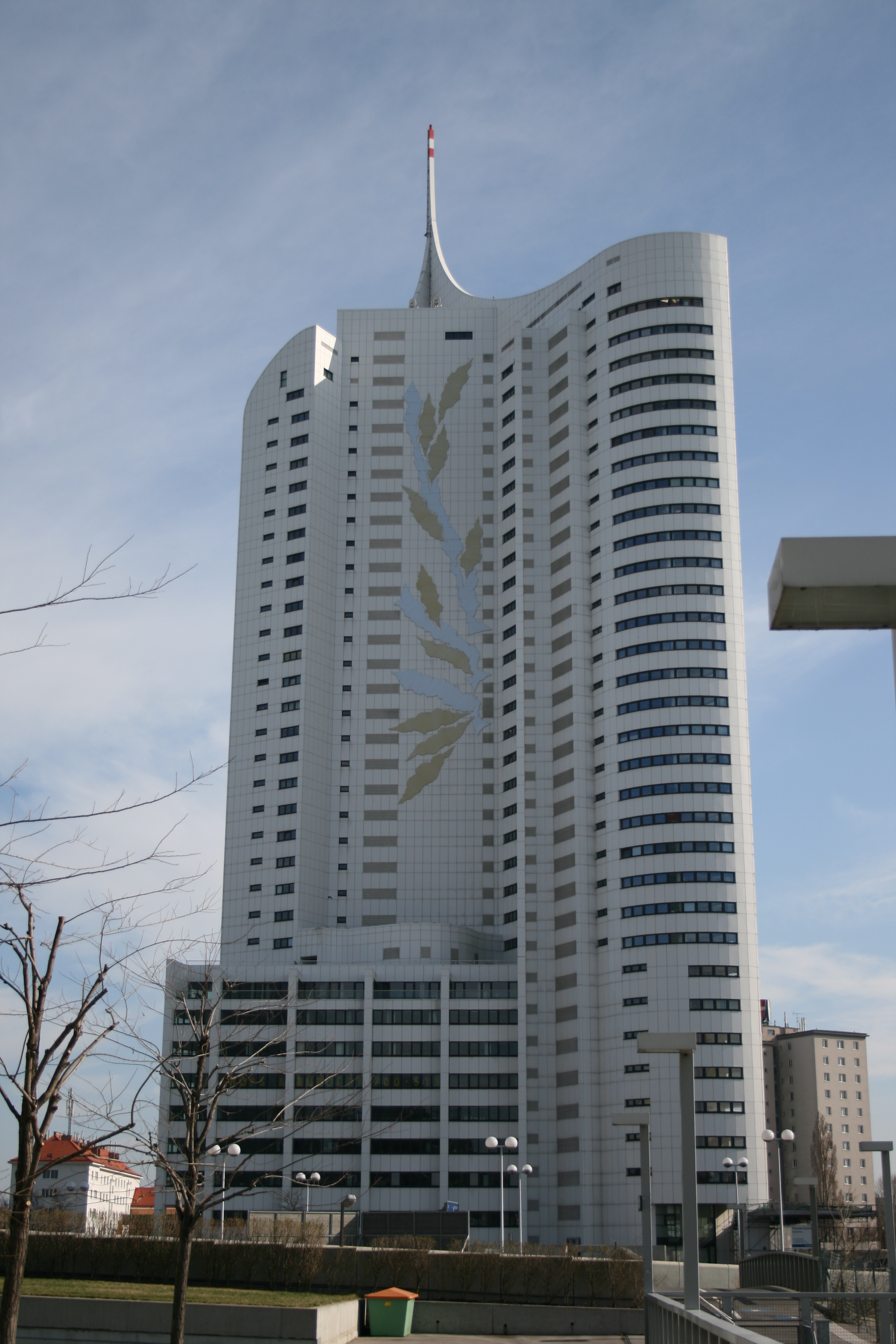
Hochhaus Neue Donau, Vienna

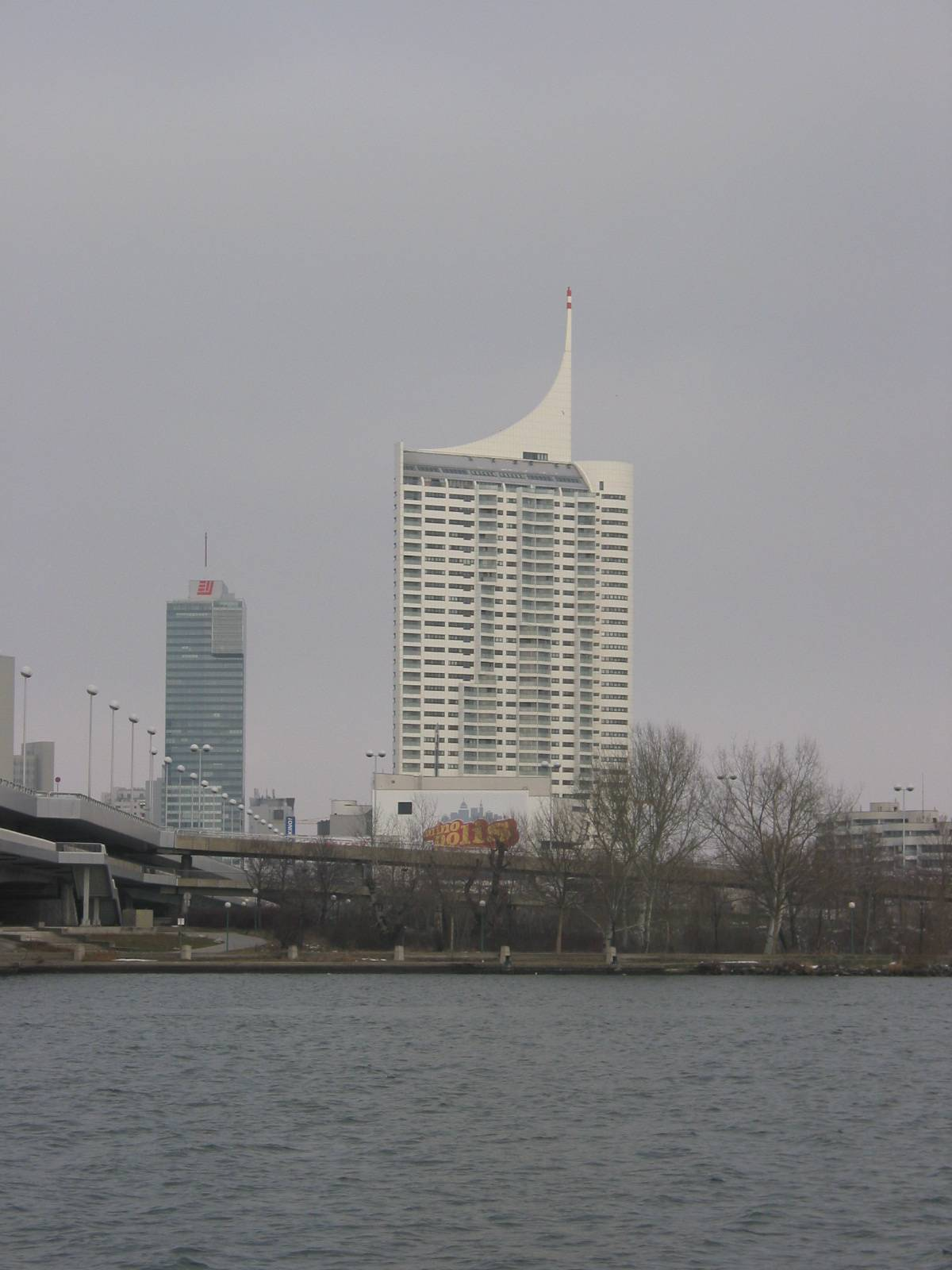
Hochhaus Neue Donau, Vienna

== Literature ==
=== by Harry Seidler ===
- Houses, Interiors, Projects (1954) Associated General Publications, Sydney. Reprint Horwitz, Sydney1959 (out of print)
- Internment: The Diaries of Harry Seidler May 1940 – October 1941, Allen & Unwin, Sydney 1986; Unwin Hyman 1987, ISBN 0-86861-915-9, in co-operation with Janis Wilton, Judith Winternitz (out of print)
- The Grand Tour, Travelling the World with an Architect's Eye, Taschen 2004, ISBN 978-3-8228-2555-6 (English, 704 pages). editions in other languages.

=== about Harry Seidler ===
- Rayner Banham (Introduction): Harry Seidler 1955/63: Houses Buildings and Projects (1963) Horowitz, Sydney; Freal, Paris; Hate, Stuttgart (English, French & German text) (out of print)
- Peter Blake: Architecture for the New World: The Work of Harry Seidler, Sydney 1973, ISBN 3-7828-1459-2
- Blake, Peter (1979). Harry Seidler, Australian embassy = Ambassade d'Australie, Paris (in English and French). Sydney: Horwitz Australia. ISBN 0-7255-0551-6. OCLC 5791549.
- Drew, Philip (1980). Two towers : Harry Seidler, Australia Square, MLC Centre. Sydney: Horwitz Grahame Books. ISBN 0-7255-0815-9. OCLC 8467144.
- Frampton, Kenneth (1988). Riverside Centre, Harry Seidler. Cammeray, N.S.W.: Horwitz Grahame. ISBN 0-7255-2056-6. OCLC 27528267.
- Kenneth Frampton, Philip Drew: Harry Seidler: Four Decades of Architecture, Thames & Hudson, 1992, ISBN 0-500-97838-7 (out of print)
- Dennis Sharp (introduction): "Harry Seidler: Selected and Current Works", The Master Architect, Series III, Images Publishing 1997, ISBN 1-875498-75-3 (out of print)
- Spigelman, Alice (2001). Almost full circle : Harry Seidler : a biography. Rose Bay, N.S.W.: Brandl & Schlesinger. ISBN 1-876040-15-7. OCLC 47212894.
- Chris Abel (introduction): Harry Seidler – Houses & Interiors, Volume 1 (1948–1970) & Volume 2(1970–2000), Images Publishing, Mulgrave (Melbourne) 2003, (Vol. 1) ISBN 1-86470-104-8, (Vol. 2) ISBN 1-86470-105-6, Boxed Set ISBN 1-920744-16-9
- Förster, Wolfgang (2002). Harry Seidler : Wohnpark Neue Donau, Wien; Sozialer Wohnungsbau, Innovative Architektur [Harry Seidler; Neue Donau Housing Estate, Vienna; Social housing, innovative architecture]. Munich: Prestel. ISBN 3-7913-2703-8. OCLC 49594724.
- O'Neill, Helen (2016). A singular vision : Harry Seidler. Sydney: HarperCollins. ISBN 978-1-4607-5202-9. OCLC 965513492.
- Belogolovskiĭ, Vladimir (2014). Harry Seidler : lifework. New York: Rizzoli. ISBN 978-0-8478-4228-5. OCLC 856977327.
- (film) Frozen Music: Rose Seidler House and the Work of Harry Seidler (2004) (22 minutes) – film screened on loop at Rose Seidler House during opening hours.

== See also ==
- Australian Architecture Association
- Australian architectural styles
- Formalism (art)
