= Rose Seidler House =

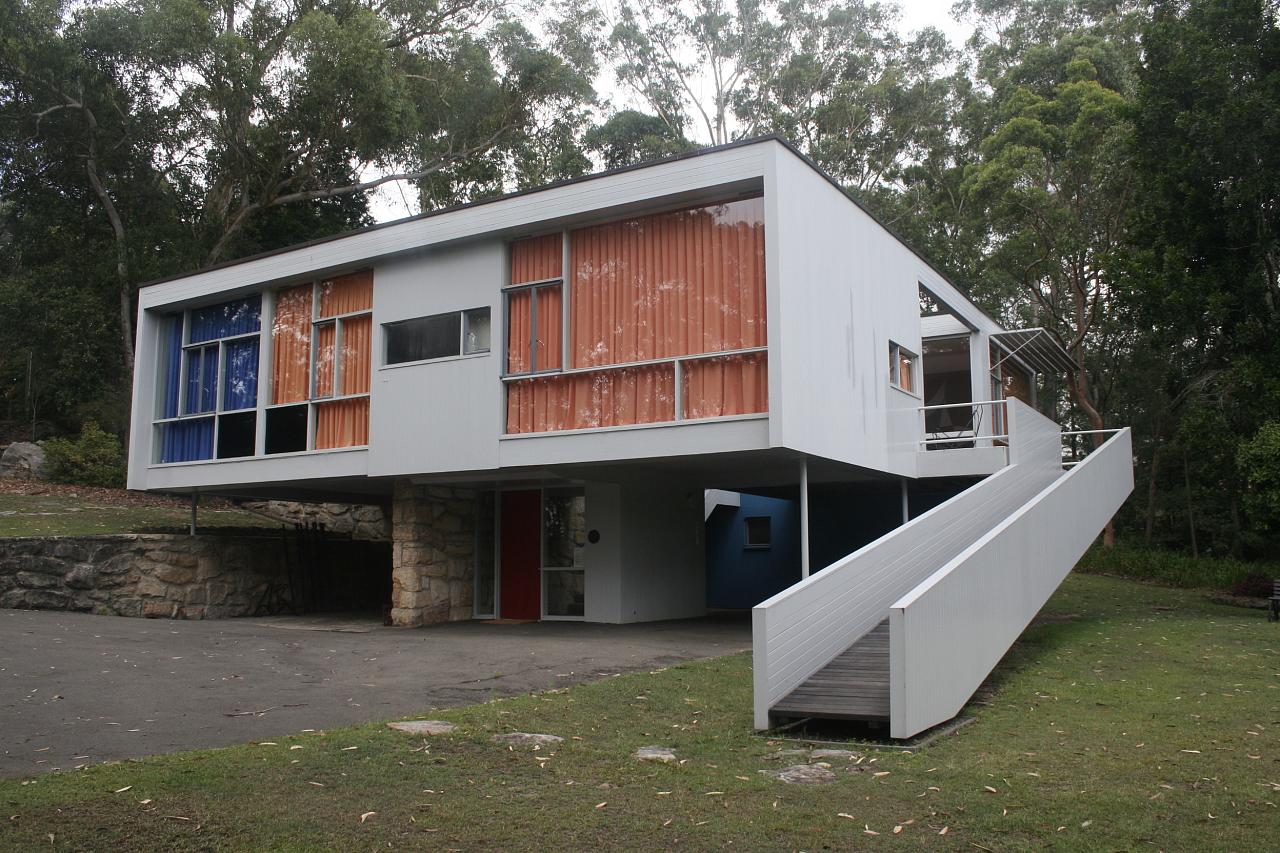
- Rose Seidler House, Sydney, New South Wales, Australia. The architect, Harry Seidler, was the winner of the 1951 Sir John Sulman Medal.

- Location within east Sydney Location within Australia
- 33°42′35″S 151°08′31″E
- Location: 69–71 Clissold Road, Wahroonga, Ku-ring-gai Council, New South Wales, Australia

History
- Built: 1948–1950

Site notes
- Architect: Harry Seidler
- Architectural style: International modernist
- Owner: NSW Office of Environment and Heritage

New South Wales Heritage Register
- Official name: Rose Seidler House; In neighbourhood precinct with Marcus Seidler House and Teplitzky House or Rose House
- Type: State heritage (built)
- Designated: 2 April 1999
- Reference no.: 261
- Type: House
- Category: Residential buildings (private)
- Builders: Bret R. Lake

Rose Seidler House is a heritage-listed former residence and now house museum located at 69–71 Clissold Road in the Sydney suburb of Wahroonga in the Ku-ring-gai Council local government area of New South Wales, Australia. It was designed by Harry Seidler and built from 1948 to 1950 by Bret R. Lake. It is also known as In neighbourhood precinct with Marcus Seidler House and Teplitzky House or Rose House. The property is owned by the NSW Office of Environment and Heritage, an agency of the Government of New South Wales. It was added to the New South Wales State Heritage Register on 2 April 1999.

The mid-century modern house was designed for both of Seidler's parents – Rose and Max Seidler, however since Rose Seidler was the person who initiated and drove the commission, making all the main client decisions, the house is named after only her.

== History ==
In 1855 to 1856 the NSW Lands Department put up for Crown land auction a large area from St Ives Public School to the present Clissold Road, Wahroonga that included the Rose Seidler House site. For twenty years not one lot was sold and in 1877 the whole area was bought by William Billyard. After passing through several hands undeveloped, the mortgagee, The Sydney Land Bank and Financial Agency Co came into possession of it and subdivided the whole area into 38 allotments of 1–4 hectares (2–10 acres) in 1893 and was called the "Pymble View Estate."

During the turn of the century the more accessible areas attracted the attention of the developing middle class who were seeking property suitable for large houses and generous gardens in bushland settings. In the more inaccessible pockets such as Clissold Road, tradespeople and gardeners established market and flower gardens, orchards, dairies and poultry farms with an array of homebuilt shacks and sheds.

The gazettal of the Cumberland County Plan in 1951 led to the promoting of neighbourhood areas whilst retaining open space and green belts. This planning scheme led to a new wave of developers and middle class professionals who were attracted to the bushland settings and vistas for architect-designed homes.

In 1948 Harry Seidler arrived in Sydney to build a house for his parents and decided upon Clissold Road. The Seidler family purchased 6.5 hectares (16 acres) for A£500. Seidler had envisaged a family estate. He strategically sited three houses which were flanked by an S-shaped driveway. There was provision for a swimming pool and communal areas in the centre of the triangle formed by the houses. The communal housing estate was surrounded by vegetable gardens and indigenous bush.

Rose Seidler house was built between 1948 and 1950. By 1952 the 6.5 hectares (16 acres) had been divided into three lots and by 1956 Marcus Seidler House and Rose House had been completed. The Seidler family lived here for the next twenty years. During this time subdivisions occurred and in the late 1960s Harry Seidler's parents died. Rose Seidler House was leased out until 1980 and lived in by Elizabeth Evatt (sister-in-law of Harry Seidler) and her children Richard and Anne. In 1981 Harry Seidler renovated the interior and exterior of the house.

In 1988 Harry Seidler officially handed over Rose Seidler House to the Minister Administering the Heritage Act. The property was leased to the Historic Houses Trust of New South Wales (now called Museums of History NSW) for use as a public museum. The museum has been open to the public each Sunday since 1991.

== Description ==
=== Setting and garden ===
The exterior of the Rose Seidler House

Rose Seidler House is part of Harry Seidler's conceptual planning of a family compound of three modernist houses, inspired by north-east American prototypes. The relationship of architecture with landscape, the house in a cleared space with few, deliberately-retained eucalypts, demonstrates one of the principal tenets of modernism - the contrast between man-made object and nature (order/disorder) - the built form set against space and time.

However the garden that evolved around one of Australia's iconic prototypical modernist houses became an expression of the recent immigrant Rose Seidler's personal creativity. It was both typically suburban in the choice of planting and idiosyncratic in the integration of terraced citrus orchard with ornamental plants. Mrs Seidler particularly delighted in growing plants that she could not possibly have grown in Vienna or in England: frangipani (Plumeria rubra), oranges, port wine magnolia (Michelia figo) and Queensland firewheel tree (Stenocarpus sinuatus). The story of the garden adds a layer of richness to the interpretation of the house.

Three garden characteristics are present on the site. There is indigenous bushland still covering large sections of the site. But modern landscaping of the driveway and the immediate area around the house, rough stone retaining walls and ramp. The resident gardening of Rose Seidler permeates the site and subtlety infiltrates both the native bushland and the modern landscaping.

=== House ===
Rose Seidler House is a modern two-storey, 12 room house sited on one hectare (two point five acres) of suburban bushland with intact gardens. The house is constructed of four basic materials; natural bush stone, reinforced concrete, timber and glass.

Built in 1949–1950 in the International modernist style, it was futuristic and modern for Australia at that time, and is an outstanding example of mid-century-modern domestic architecture. In 1991, Harry Seidler described the house's spatial design which was characteristic of his approach in the rest of his life's work:

"...this house explodes the surfaces that enclose a normal house or space, and turns it into a continuum of free standing planes, through which the eye can never see an end, you are always intrigued what’s beyond, you can always see something floating into the distance, there is never an obstruction to your vision, it is a continuum (of space), that I believe 20th century man’s eye and senses respond positively to.

One of the bedrooms in the Rose Seidler House

Following the example of the houses he had worked on in Breuer's office in 1946-48 which were located on compounds next to a public nature reserve in North-East USA, Seidler picked the site for the house because it was next to Ku-Ring-Gai Chase reserve. In 1948, the site had been used to mine pottery clay, and was considered very remote - being at the end of a dirt road through market gardens. It was long after the house was finished that the surrounding streets were paved and developed as a residential suburb.

The ground floor is elevated to the north and east sides. The stone foundations provide three walls of the double garage. A large recreation area on the north side is partially sheltered by the ramp and sundeck of the first floor. The two storey open well filters light through to this area. A caretaker's flat is located at the end of the recreation area.

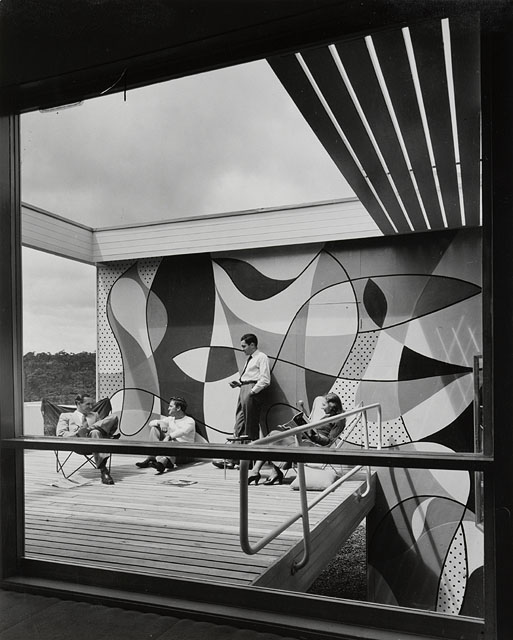
Outside verandah and mural.

The main entrance door is via a small foyer. Stairs lead up to the first floor and the comforts of a fireplace and a magnificent vista of the Ku-ring-gai bushland through a wall of glass. There are four inter-related features of the interior planning scheme.

Each room except the main bathroom has a full view, bringing the outside, inside. There are full glass walls in the living, dining, playroom and 3 bedrooms; above waist height windows in the kitchen, laundry and main bedroom and above shoulder height in the en-suite bathroom. Direct or close contact to related outdoor areas is available for each room.

The bi-nuclear plan clearly separates living areas from sleeping and bathrooms. These are connected by the flexible transitional zones of the playroom and deck.

Spatial freedom and flexibility of spaces is maximised and achieved by the arrangement of functional and temporary dividers that redefine spaces according to their use.

The minimal interiors aim to produce visual tension or counterpoint through "tensional opposition" of recurrent elements, forms, planes, colours, and materials. The smooth neutral plaster walls counterpoint the rough texture of the sandstone.

=== Modifications and dates ===
In 1948 structural plans were completed and construction commenced. Completed in 1950. First major renovations were undertaken in 1971 including recarpeting, repainting and some new electrical and bathroom fittings. A second major renovation was undertaken in 1981 which included exterior maintenance and interior redecorating. The third major renovation was undertaken in 1988.

== Heritage listing ==
The Rose Seidler House's kitchen

As at 8 December 2008, Rose Seidler House is historically significant as a resource to demonstrate the many features of Modernist art, architecture and design theory and practice. It is one of the finest and purest examples of mid-century modern domestic architecture in Australia as designed by the second generation of twentieth century Modern architects. It also contains intact contents of late 1940s furniture by such renown designers as Eames, Saarinen and Hardoy. Rose Seidler House is socially significant because of its influence on the character of domestic architecture in New South Wales, not only by direct imitators in the 1950s but on the thinking of architects and architectural practice in subsequent decades. It is technically significant for its design detailing and choice of construction methods and materials which highlight aspects of postwar housing construction in a period of conservative building regulations, scarcity of materials, skills and industrial processes. The house incorporates many examples of modern domestic technology and commercial products which were introduced into Australia at this time. These include electric appliances, labour saving devices, materials, fittings and storage systems.

Rose Seidler House was listed on the New South Wales State Heritage Register on 2 April 1999 having satisfied the following criteria.

The place is important in demonstrating the course, or pattern, of cultural or natural history in New South Wales.

Rose Seidler House is historically significant as a resource to demonstrate the many features of Modernist art, architecture and design theory and practice.

The place is important in demonstrating aesthetic characteristics and/or a high degree of creative or technical achievement in New South Wales.

Rose Seidler House is one of the finest and purest examples of mid-century modern domestic architecture in Australia. A product of the second generation of twentieth century Modern architects. Rose Seidler House contains intact contents of the late 1940s furniture by such renown designers as Eames, Saarin and Hardoy.

The place has a strong or special association with a particular community or cultural group in New South Wales for social, cultural or spiritual reasons.

Rose Seidler House is socially significant because of its influence on the character of domestic architecture in New South Wales, not only in direct imitators in the 1950s but on the thinking of architects and architectural practice in subsequent decades.

The place has potential to yield information that will contribute to an understanding of the cultural or natural history of New South Wales.

Rose Seidler House is technically significant for its design detailing and choice of construction methods and materials highlighting aspects of postwar housing construction in a period of conservative building regulations, scarcity of materials, skills and industrial process. The house incorporates many examples of modern domestic technology and commercial products that demonstrate the introduction of electric appliances, labour saving devices, materials, fittings and storage systems into Australia.

== See also ==
- Australian residential architectural styles
- Harry and Penelope Seidler House
