= Parks and gardens of Sydney =

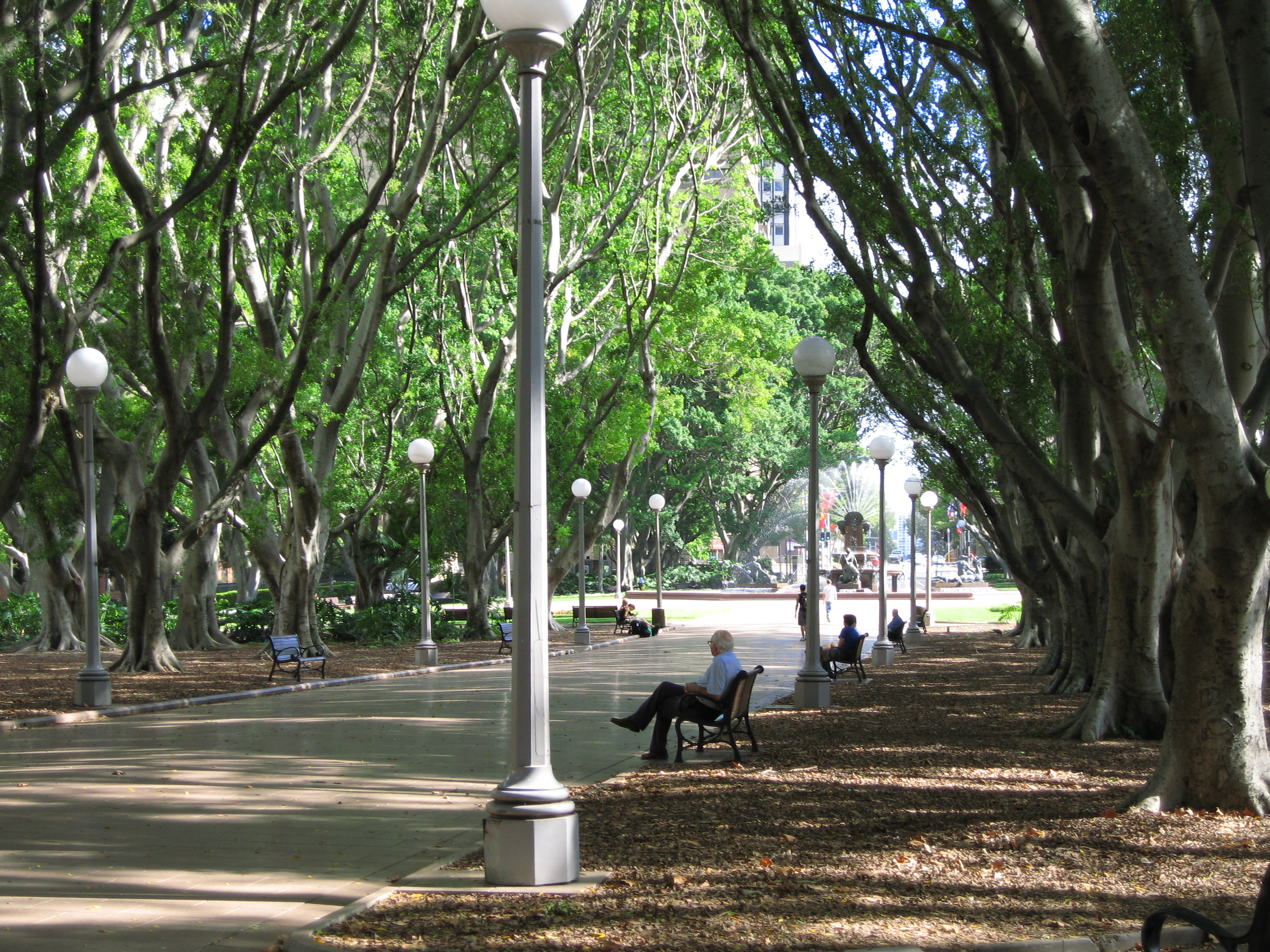
A fig-lined avenue in Hyde Park, Sydney

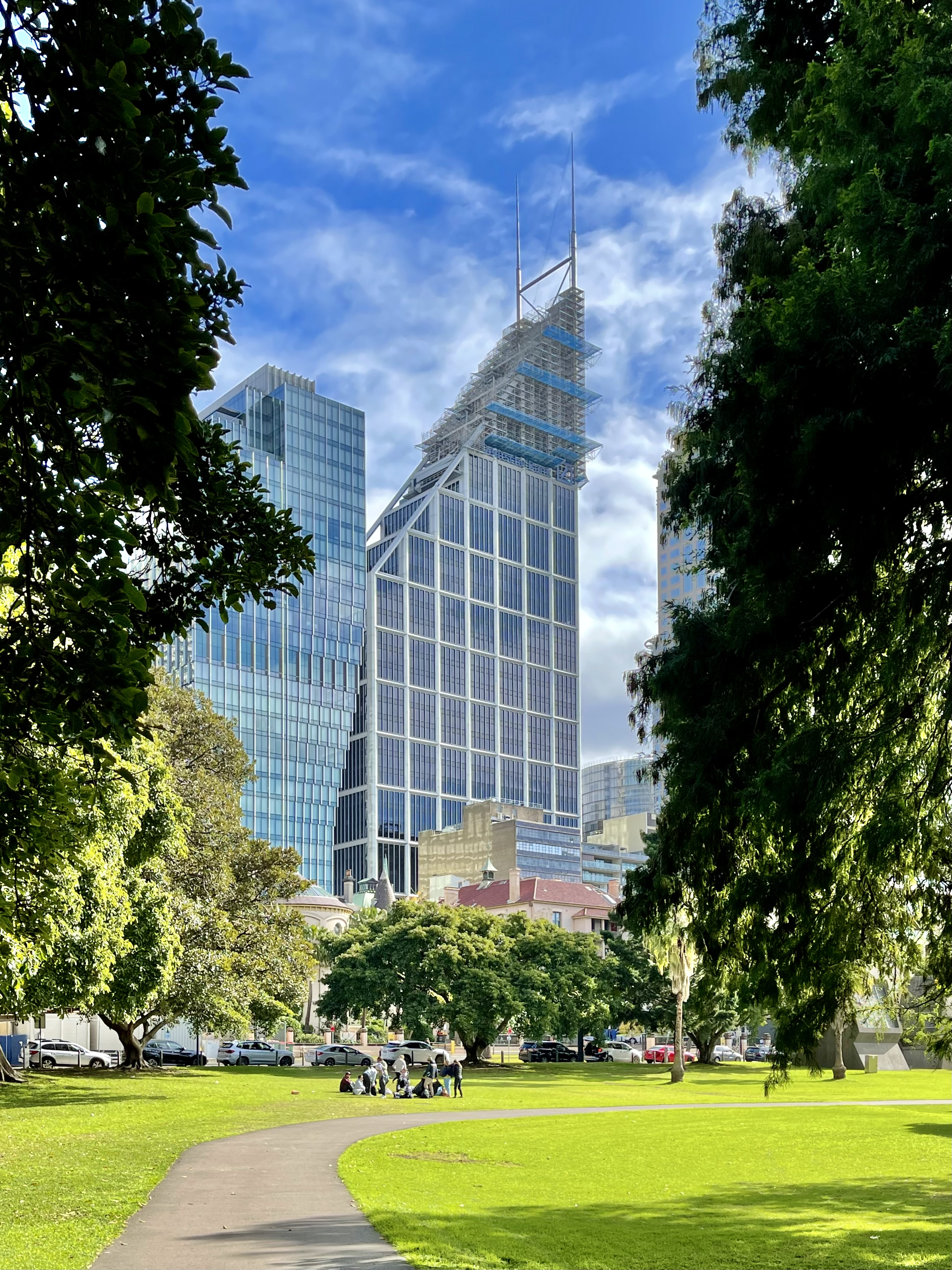
The Domain

Sydney is well endowed with open spaces and has many natural areas. Many of these exist even within the compact city centre. These include the Chinese Garden of Friendship and Hyde Park (which is named after London's Hyde Park). The metropolitan area contains several national parks, including the Royal National Park, the second oldest national park in the world (after Yellowstone National Park), which occupies an area of 132 square kilometres (51 sq mi; 13,200 ha; 33,000 acres). Completing Sydney's wide array of green spaces, the leader is the Royal Botanic Garden, with its large amount of green spaces, lush plants and colourful flowers.

Although Sydney developed organically after the arrival of the First Fleet, the city parks and open spaces were a part of early town planning to provide relief from the bustle and monotony of the city streets. Hyde Park is the oldest park in the city.

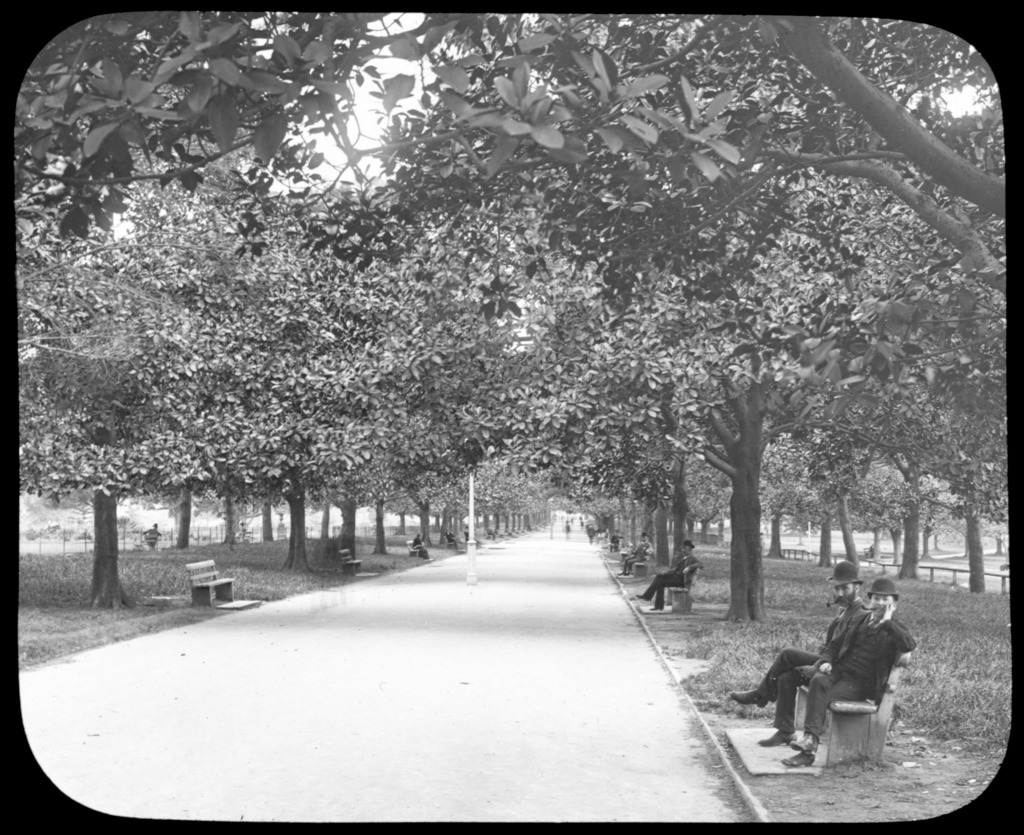
"Lover's Walk", Hyde Park, circa 1912

== Largest parks in Sydney metropolitan area ==
Ordinal	Park name	Area		Notes
Ordinal	Park name	ha	acres	Notes
1	Ku-ring-gai Chase National Park	15,400	38,054	
2	Royal National Park	13,200	32,618	
3	Western Sydney Parklands	5,280	13,047	
4	Heathcote National Park	2,250	5,560	
5	Garigal National Park	2,200	5,436	
6	Lane Cove National Park	600	1,483	
7	Sydney Harbour National Park	411	1,016	comprising ten smaller parks
8	Georges River National Park	340	840	

== Largest parks in the City of Sydney area ==
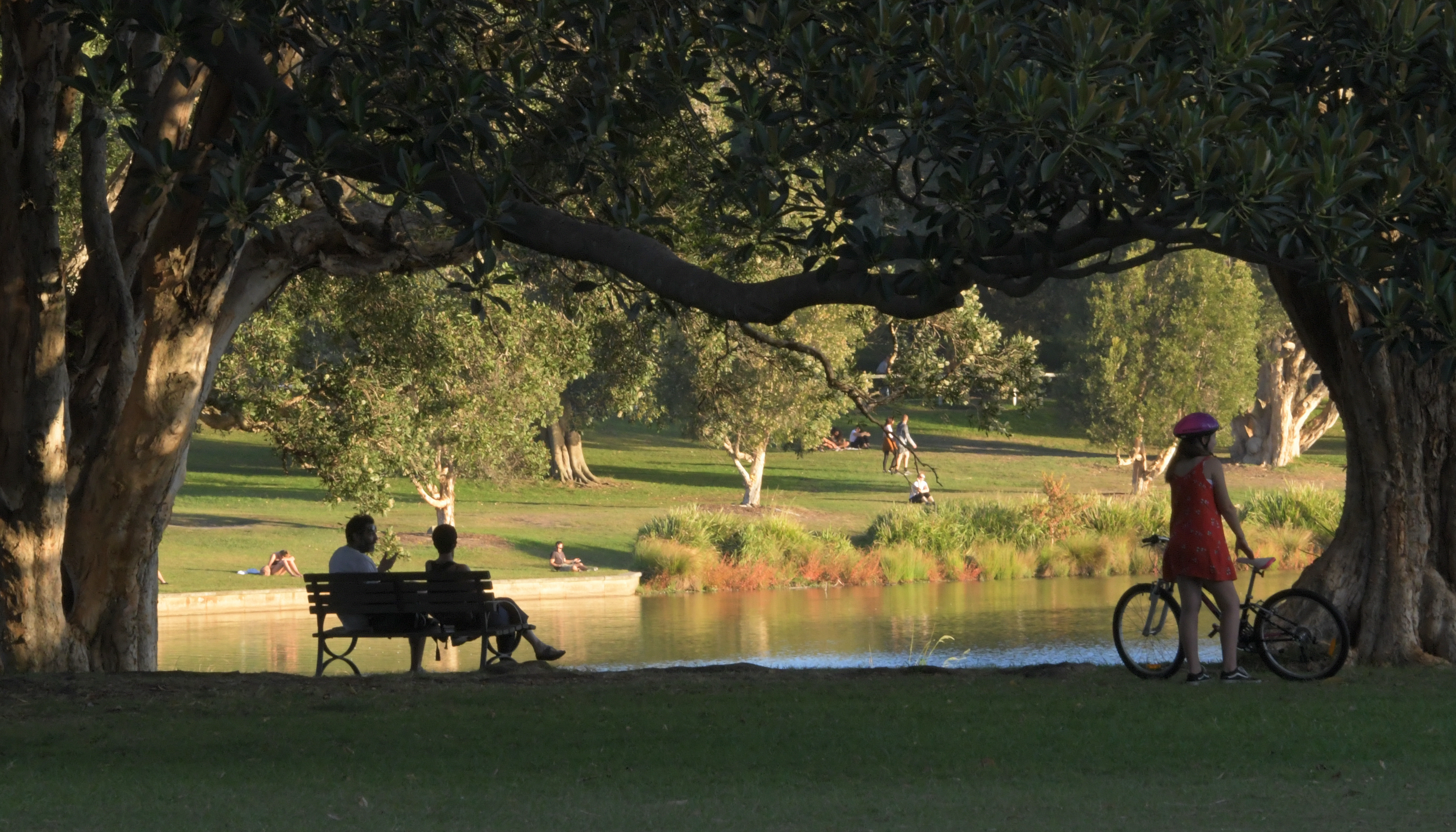
Centennial Park

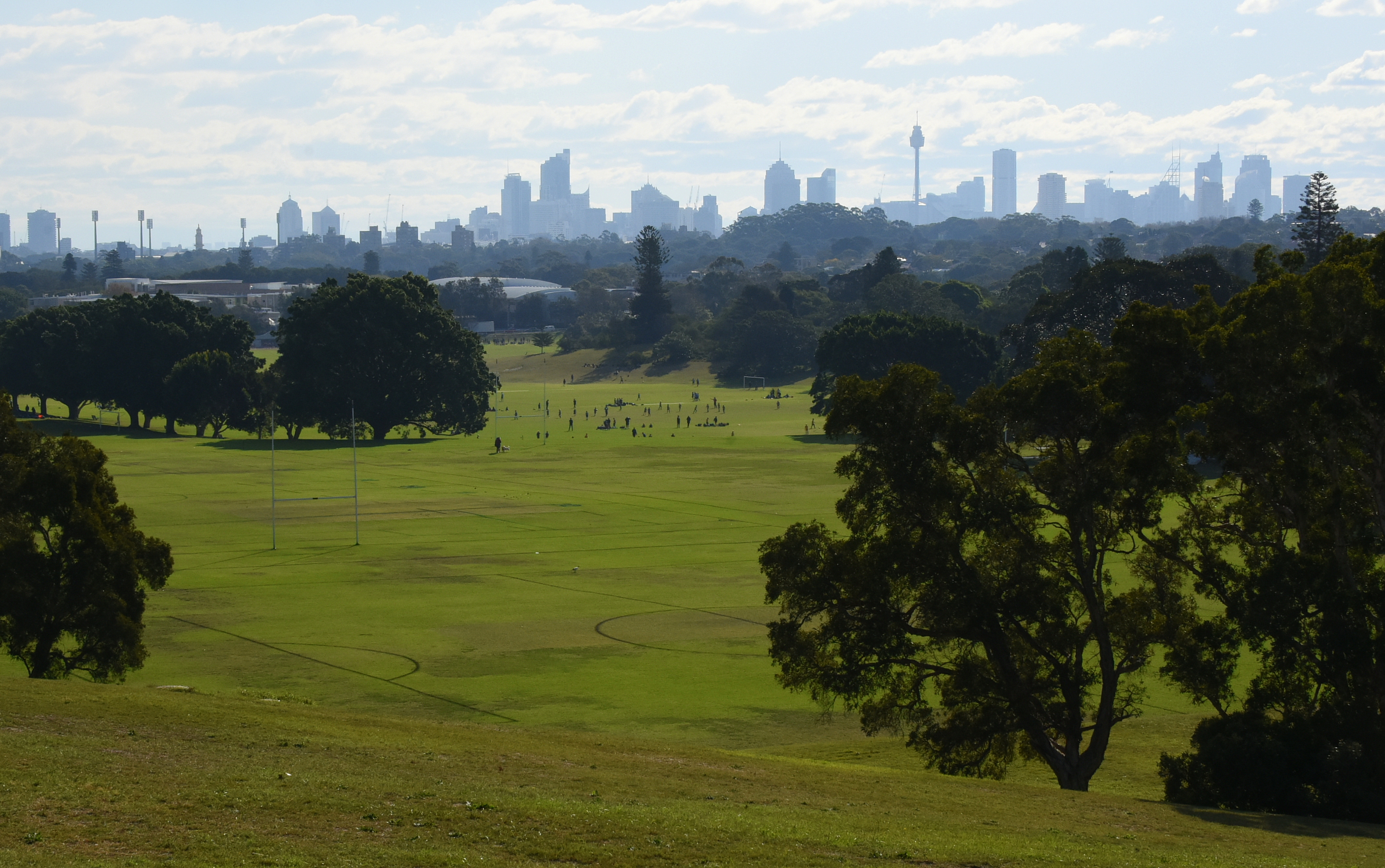
Queen's Park

Ordinal	Park name	Area		Notes
Ordinal	Park name	ha	acres	Notes
1	Centennial Park	189	467	
2	Moore Park	115	284	
3	Sydney Park	45	111	
4	The Domain	34	84	
5	Royal Botanic Garden	30	74	

== History ==
The next major open space in Sydney was the Botanical Garden (now Royal Botanic Gardens), which were established in 1816.

Early activists demanding more public parks were the Parks Preservation Society, which was founded in 1914.

The Parks and Playgrounds Movement of New South Wales was established in Sydney in the early 1930s. The group's first annual meeting was held on the 23 September 1931. The Parks and Playgrounds Movement kept pressure on the Government to provide better planning legislation and arrange for a metropolitan plan for Sydney. The movement was heavily influenced by "social Darwinism".

== Parks and reserves ==
The following is an incomplete list of parks and reserves in Sydney:

- Alexandria Park
- Anderson Park, Neutral Bay
- Angophora Reserve
- Arthur McElhone Reserve
- Auburn Botanic Gardens
- Australian Botanic Garden Mount Annan
- Badangi Reserve
- Balfour Street Park
- Ballast Point
- Balls Head Reserve
- Barangaroo Reserve
- Beare Park
- Bede Spillane Gardens
- Belmore Park
- Ben Buckler Gun Battery
- Bents Basin State Conservation Area
- Berowra Valley Regional Park
- Berry Island Reserve
- Bicentennial Park
  - Brickpit Ring Walk
  - Louise Sauvage Pathway
- Bicentennial Square
- Birchgrove Park
- Botany Bay National Park
- Bradley's Head
- Brenan Park
- Brightmore Reserve
- Burwood Park
- Carss Cottage
- Centenary Park
- Centennial Parklands
  - Centennial Park
  - Moore Park
  - Queens Park
- Central Gardens Nature Reserve
- Chinese Garden of Friendship
- Cremorne Point Reserve
  - Robertsons Point
- Chipping Norton Lake
- Cooks River/Castlereagh Ironbark ecological community
- The Domain
- Fagan Park
- Fairfield Park Precinct
- Ferndale Park
- First Fleet Park, The Rocks
- Fred Hollows Reserve
- Frog Hollow Reserve, Surry Hills
- Garawarra State Conservation Area
- Garigal National Park
- Garrison Point
- George Kendall Riverside Park
- Georges River National Park
- Gipps Road and Hyland Road Regional Parklands
- The Goods Line
- Green Park, Darlinghurst
- Harmony Park, Surry Hills
- Heathcote National Park
- Hyde Park
- Iloura Reserve
- Jessie Street Gardens
- Joseph Banks Native Plants Reserve, Kareela
- Kellys Bush Park
- Koala Park Sanctuary
- Ku-ring-gai Chase National Park
- Lake Parramatta Reserve
- Lane Cove Bushland Park
- Lane Cove National Park
- Leacock Regional Park
- Lower Prospect Canal Reserve
- Macquarie Place Park
- Magdala Park
- McKell Park
- McLeod Reserve
- Moore Reserve
- Mortdale Memorial Park
- Neild Park
- Nielsen Park
- Nurragingy Reserve
- Oatley Park
- Oatley Pleasure Grounds
- Oatley Point Reserve
- Observatory Park, Sydney
- Oxford Falls Peace Park
- Paddington Reservoir
- Parramatta River Regional Park
- Penrith Lakes Regional Park
- Prince Alfred Park
- Prince Alfred Square
- Prospect Hill
- Prospect Nature Reserve
- Pyrmont Point Park
- Queen Elizabeth Park
- Redfern Park
- Rockdale Bicentennial Park
- Rofe Park
- Rosford Street Reserve
- Rouse Hill Regional Park
- Royal Botanical Garden
- Rushcutters Bay Park
- Smoothey Park
- St Leonards Park
- St Thomas Rest Park
- Sydney Cove West Archaeological Precinct
- Sydney Harbour National Park
- Sydney Park
- Sydney Zoo
- Tania Park
- Taronga Zoo
- Terry Lamb Complex
- Victoria Park, Camperdown
- Wadim (Bill) Jegorow Reserve
- Wallumatta Nature Reserve
- Walter Burley Griffin Incinerator, Willoughby
- Waverley Cemetery
- Waverley Park
- Wentworth Park
- Western Sydney Parklands
- Wetherill Park Nature Reserve
- Wild Life Sydney
- William Howe Regional Park
- Wolli Creek Regional Park
- Wynyard Park, Sydney
- Yellomundee Regional Park
- Yurulbin Park

== See also ==
- Australia's Open Garden Scheme
- Gardening in Australia
- Heritage gardens in Australia
- Protected areas of New South Wales
- Ecology of Sydney
