= David Kang =

Australian barrister (born 1970)

- Born: 1970 (age 55–56); Australia
- Education: Macquarie University (BA); University of Technology Sydney (MBA); University of Sydney (LLB)
- Known for: Firing two blank shots of a starting pistol at Charles, Prince of Wales
- Children: 2

David Kang (born 1970) is an Australian barrister and former criminal. In 1994, he fired two blank shots from a starting pistol at Charles, Prince of Wales (now King Charles III) in protest of the treatment of several hundred Cambodian asylum seekers held in detention camps in Australia.

== Early life and education ==
David Kang was born in Australia to Robert Kang, a former Republic of Korea Air Force helicopter pilot. At the time of the starting pistol incident, in 1994, Kang was an anthropology student at Macquarie University. Kang later graduated with a Bachelor of Arts degree in anthropology from the university.

== Protest against Prince Charles ==
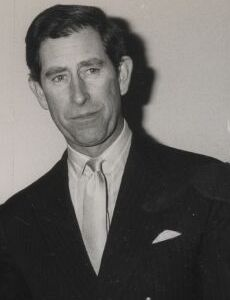
Prince Charles (pictured in 1992) was the target of the protest

On 26 January 1994, the 23-year old Kang fired two blank shots from a starting pistol at Charles, Prince of Wales during an Australia Day speech at Tumbalong Park, Darling Harbour in Sydney.

Kang jumped a small fence at the front of the stage and ran onto the stage, firing the first shot with his pistol as he rushed towards the Prince, who had just risen to approach the lectern on the stage. He was wrestled to the ground by police after crashing into the lectern as he fired the second shot. At least 15 people jumped onto the assailant, while the Prince's bodyguard shielded the Prince, who was removed from the stage. The Prince sustained no injuries and would next visit Sydney on 28 February 2005.

There was admiration for the speed with which the Prince's Senior Personal Protection Officer, Superintendent Colin Trimming, rose to protect the Prince. The personal bravery of the Prince was also remarked upon by Ian Kiernan, saying that the prince was "cool as a cucumber".

Others on the stage included Rear Admiral Peter Sinclair AO (the Governor of New South Wales), John Fahey (the Premier of New South Wales), Frank Sartor (the Lord Mayor of Sydney), and Tony Lauer (the New South Wales Commissioner of Police).

Kang had been the second person to attack a royal in Sydney after Irishman Henry James O'Farrell in 1868. O'Farrell shot at Prince Alfred and was later hanged. At the time, Kang was mistakenly reported as being of Cambodian descent and the incident sparked some debate about monarchism and republicanism in Australia.

=== Arrest, trial, and sentence ===
Kang was arrested and taken to Sydney Police Centre on Goulburn Street. On the following day, he appeared in court and, facing six charges, including two under the Federal Crimes (Internationally Protected Persons) Act 1976 (Cth) (i.e., attacking an internationally protected person) and charges of illegally using a firearm, possessing a firearm, affray, and assault, was remanded in custody until 4 February 1994. If convicted on all counts, Kang could have received a 20-year sentence.

In court, Kang testified that he was suffering from depression and was protesting the plight of Cambodian refugees in Australia. Kang had previously written letters to the Prince of Wales, the President of the United States, the United Nations, and the Pope, among others, and had received a form letter reply from the Prince. Kang was found guilty of threatening unlawful violence and sentenced to 500 hours of community service.

In 2005, Kang said of the incident, "What happened 11 years ago was an extremely traumatic experience and I have certainly moved on in my life and now I have become a barrister here in Sydney." He also emphasised he had not intended to hurt anyone during his protest.

== Career ==
Following the incident, Kang earned a Master of Business Administration from the University of Technology Sydney and a Bachelor of Laws with honours from the Sydney Law School.

=== Legal career ===
Despite having been found guilty of a crime, the New South Wales Bar Association found that Kang was a "fit and proper person", with the president of the New South Wales Bar Association remarking that he had "served his time", admitting him as a barrister in 2004. Kang practices as a barrister, specialising in criminal law, commercial and corporations law, equity, and medical negligence, at Ada Evans Chambers in Sydney.

== Personal life ==
Kang is married and has two children. His interests, as listed on his chambers website, include tennis, soccer, and swimming.

== See also ==
- Marcus Sarjeant, teenager who fired blanks at Queen Elizabeth II in June 1981
- Christopher John Lewis, failed assassin of Elizabeth II in October 1981
