= Tumbalong Park =

Park in Sydney, Australia

Coordinates: 33.8757°S 151.2016°E

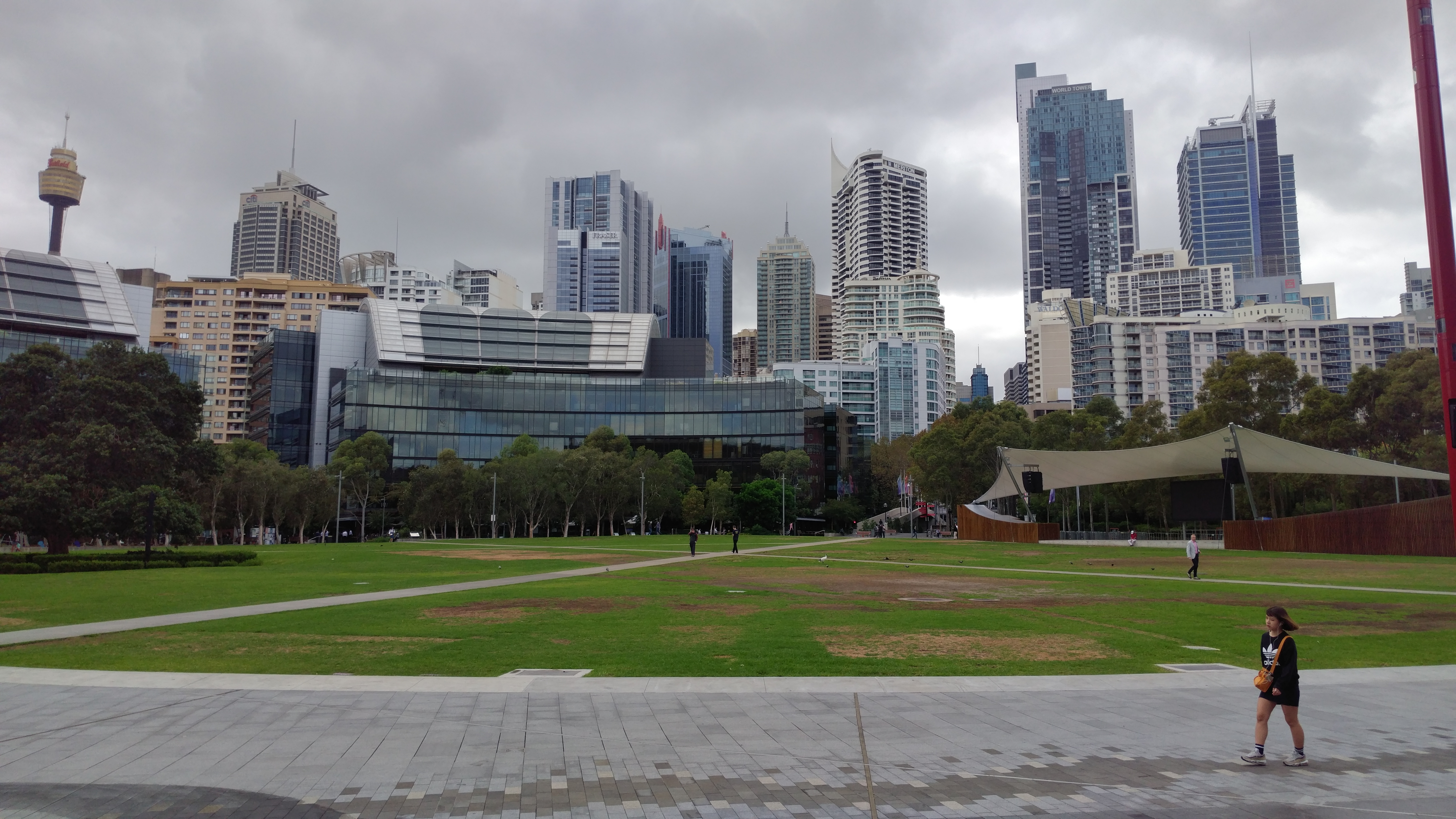
Tumbalong Park with the Sydney CBD in the background

Tumbalong Park is a park in Darling Harbour, Sydney, Australia. The park was designed using native Australian foliage decorated with fountains as an urban stream. The name "Tumbalong" is from Dharug as spoken by the Eora people and means "place where seafood is found".

The park is used as a venue for central Sydney events, including New Year's Eve and Australia Day celebrations.

== Culture ==
This site was used for the skydiving opening scene in 20th Century Fox's Mighty Morphin Power Rangers: The Movie.

It used to be the location for Sega World Sydney which opened in 1997 and closed in November 2000.

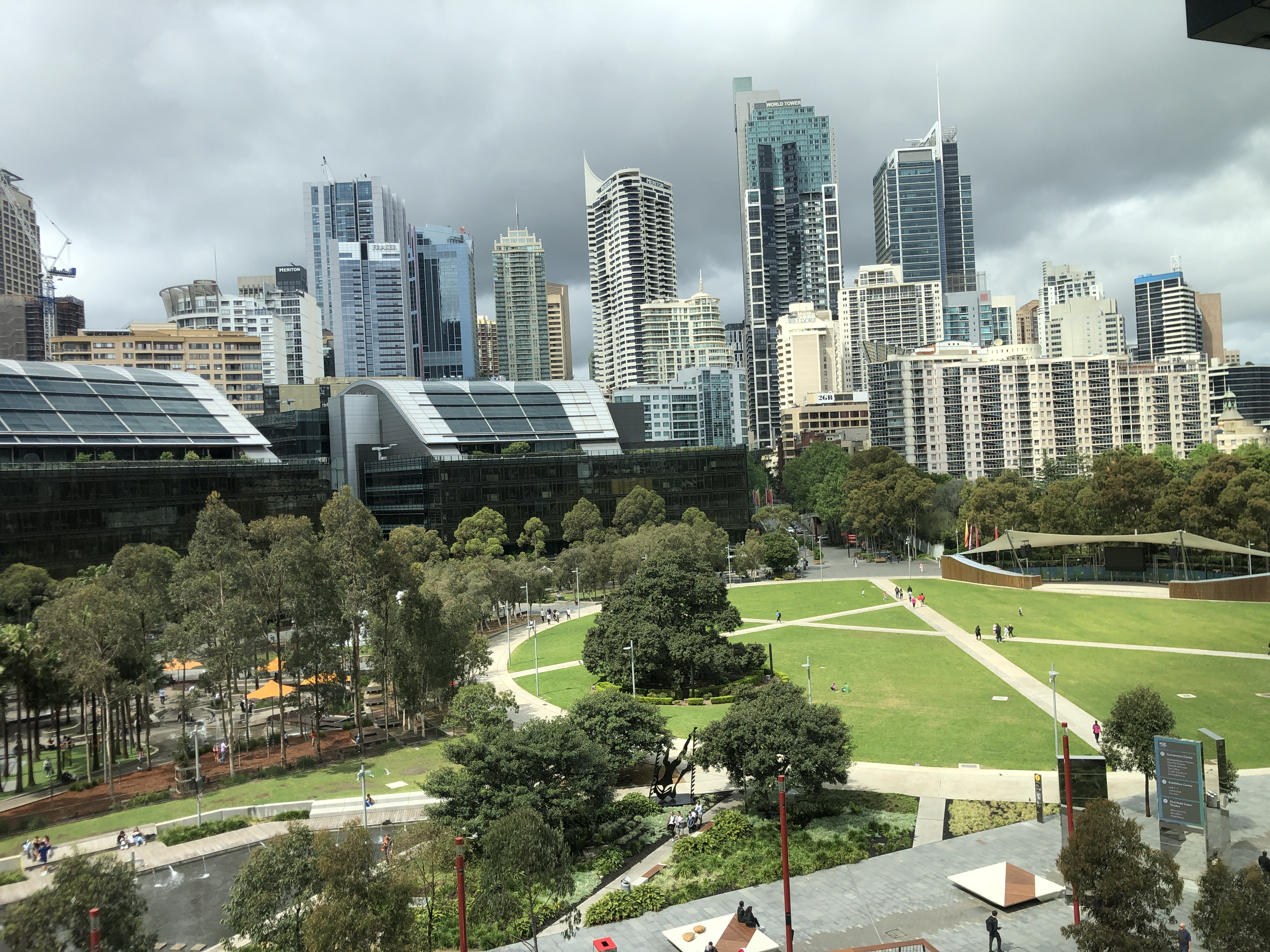
Aerial view and surrounds

== Geography ==
Tumbalong park spans 5 hectares (12 acres).

A children's playground area includes a water park containing 26 water jets, a water slide, jumbo swings, tangled web and a 10 metre high octanet jungle gym.

The park is adjacent to the Chinese Garden of Friendship.

== Amenities ==
Public toilets, cafes and restaurants are located on the park's fringes.

== Access ==
The park is a public space and is accessible by bus, train via Town Hall Station, ferry services from King Street Wharf and Pyrmont Bay wharf and light rail services via the Paddy's Market, Exhibition Centre, Convention or Pyrmont Bay stops.

== Incidents ==
In 1994, local David Kang fired two blank shots at Charles III (the then Prince of Wales) who was giving a speech at the park. Charles was not injured and Kang was arrested by police.
