= Starting pistol =

Type of pistol

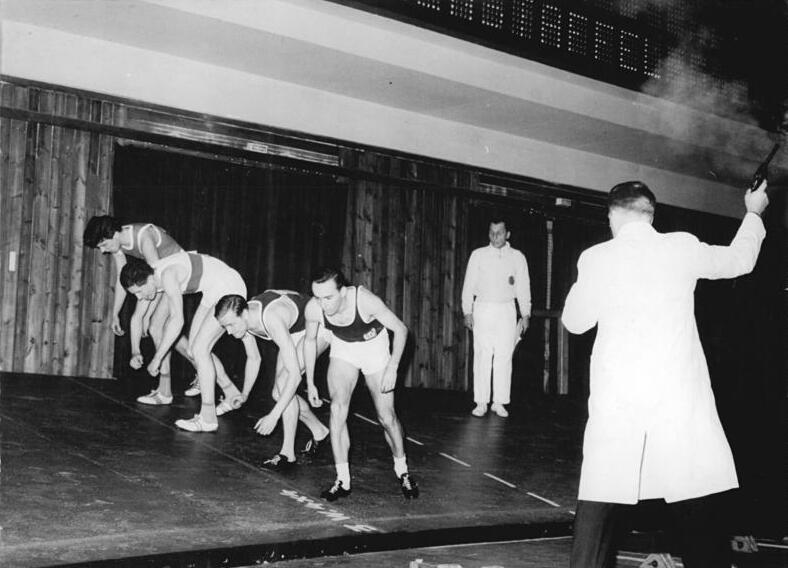
A starting pistol in use at an athletics competition in 1961.

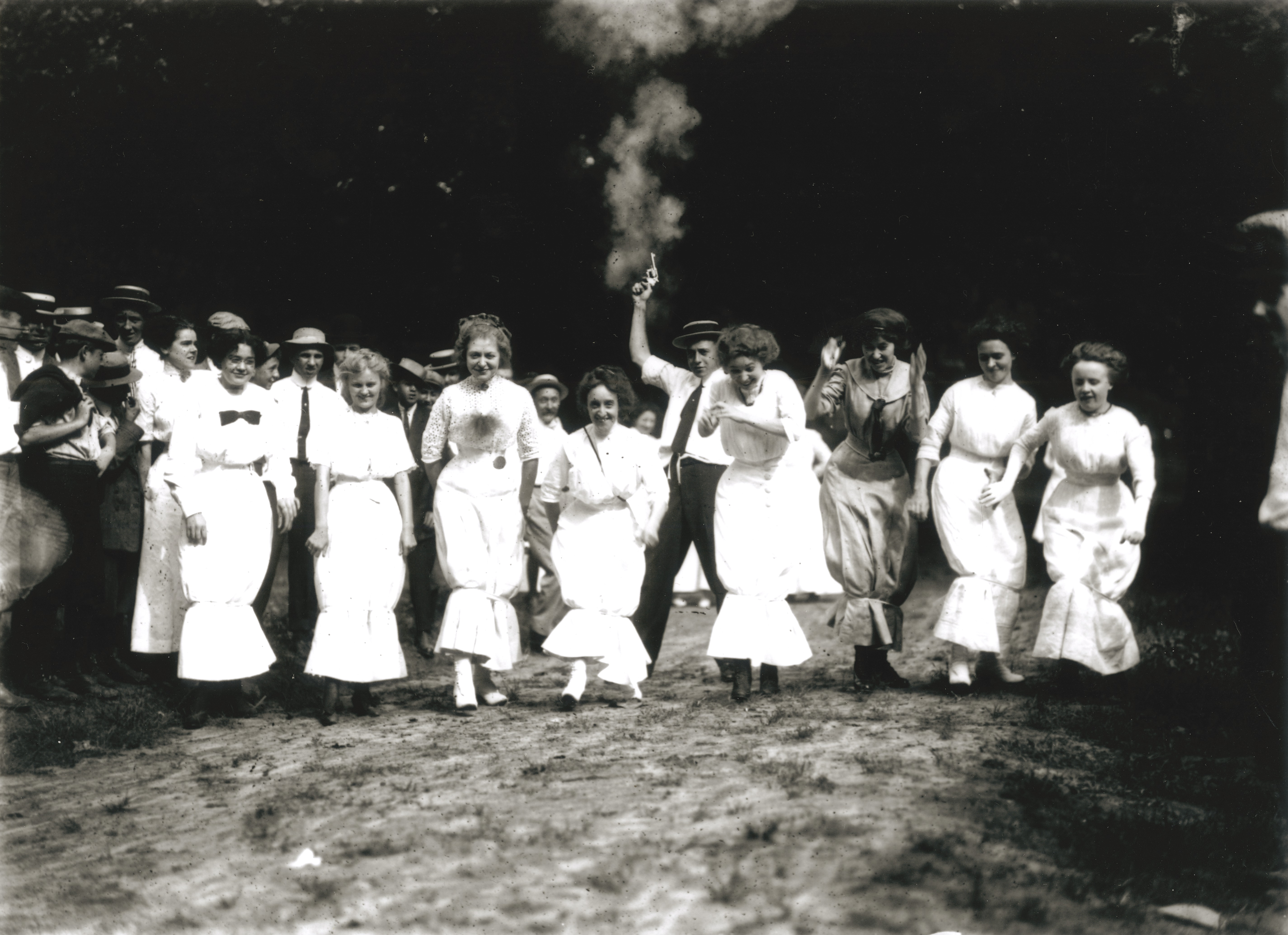
Eight women participate in a hobble skirt race. Starter gun has just been fired by man in straw boater hat.

A starting pistol or starter pistol is a blank handgun or, more recently, an electronic toy gun or device with a button connected to a sound system that is fired to start track and field races and with the change to electronic devices, competitive swimming races. Traditional starter guns cannot fire real ammunition without first being extensively modified: Blank shells or caps are used to prevent expelling projectiles, and only a small amount of smoke can be seen when shot. In most places, trying to modify the replica is illegal.

Starting pistols may also include modified versions of standard pistols incapable of firing bullets, most commonly achieved by welding an obstruction into the barrel. This is less common nowadays, especially in Western countries. When electronic timing is used, a sensor is often affixed to the gun to send a signal to start the timing system, or in modern electronic systems, pressing the button starts to the timing system upon activation. For deaf competitors or for modern electronic systems, the electronic toy gun sends off a light signal, with some events using a light system.

== Use in races ==
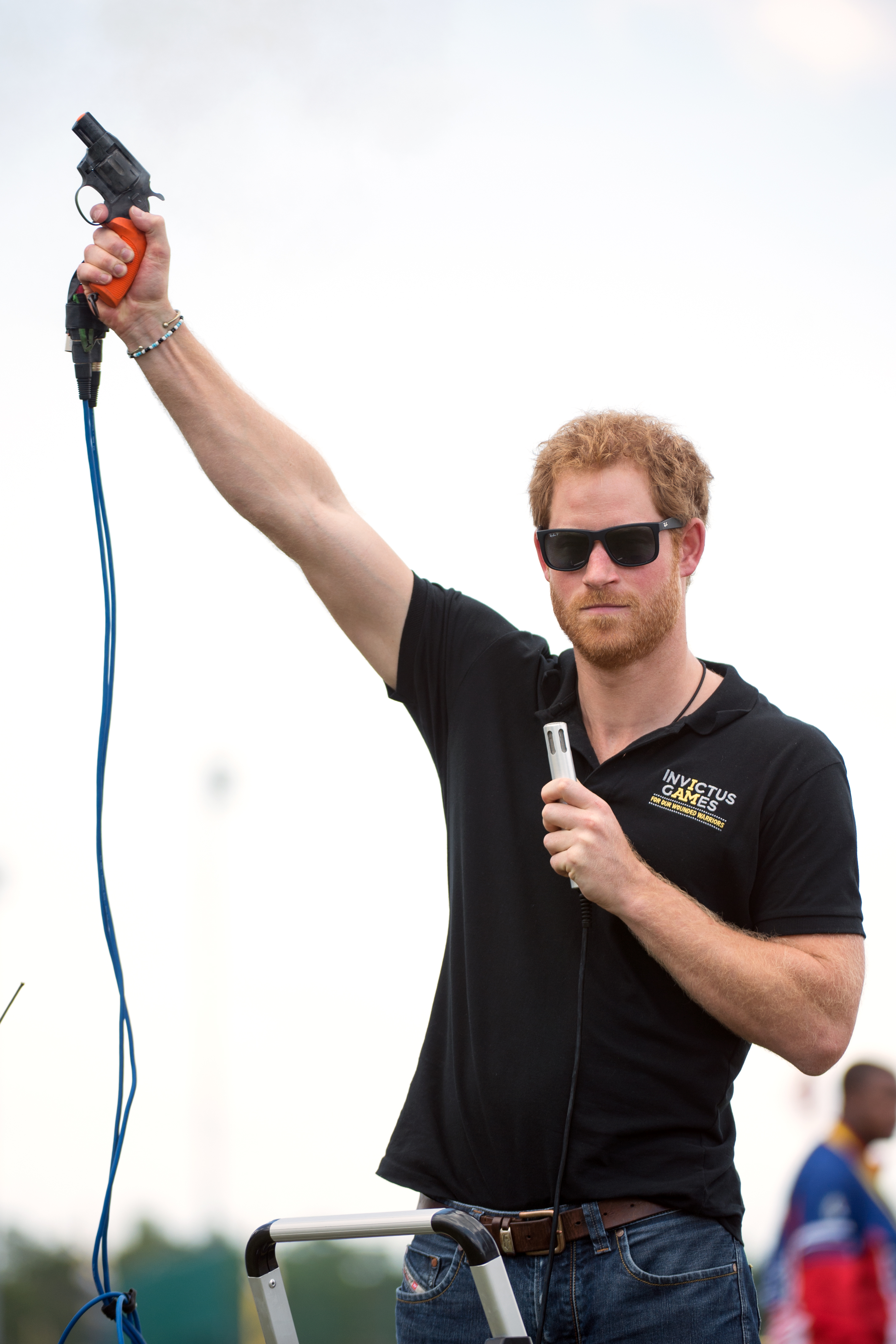
Prince Harry starts a track competition with a starting gun wired for timing at the 2016 Invictus Games

The sound of the gun going off serves as the signal for the athletes to begin an event. An issue with the use of starting pistols is that, since the report of the pistol is carried to the competitors at the speed of sound, which takes about 3 milliseconds to travel one metre, positions nearest the starter hear the report a few milliseconds before further positions. (Note: For example, the winning margin in the men's 100 meters final at the 2024 Summer Olympics was smaller than the time it would have taken sound to travel from silver medalist Kishane Thompson's lane to gold medalist Noah Lyles'.) This issue is exaggerated in races where the runners begin in a stagger, putting a significant distance between the nearest and furthest runners. To avoid this problem, in all major competitions the pistol is wired with a microphone that transmits the sound virtually instantaneously to loudspeakers directly behind each competitor.

With security after the September 11 attacks on the US becoming prevalent and causing issues with starting pistols, a trend developed to use electronic starting systems that do not use pistols but use a "dummy" prop pistol or a signaling device similar to those used on game shows which cannot function as a firearm and that is wired to the timing system. When the starter presses the button, a signal emits to play a simulated gunshot that is broadcast to loudspeakers behind each lane, show a flash from the gun, and starts the timing clock. Many venues have switched to the new format. Beyond the security concerns, it was observed that the additional time for the sound to reach the athletes further from the pistol did have a measurable impact on starting times. This delay existed even when using a combination of a real gun and electronic system. Some competitors would still wait for the actual sound of the gun to reach them, rather than starting when the speaker behind them played the start sound. Since the new all-electronic starting pistols have no such problems, they became the official way of starting games at the 2012 Summer Olympics. A further advantage of electronic starting pistols is it can be used in both swimming and athletics. Swimming uses a horn start, while athletics uses a gun start. Some electronic starting devices can be used for both by a switch on the starting system that changes the activation sound from gunshot to horn.

== Use in gridiron football ==
Officials in American and Canadian football formerly used a starting pistol to end each quarter of a game. In the NFL this was first done in 1924, to avoid confusion with the whistles and air horns used for other signals; at the time the stadium clock did not show the official game time, which was kept by the officials on the field. The stadium clock later became the official game time and the NFL discontinued the gunshot in 1994. Furthermore, upon the official end of the period, the referee will announce "That is the end of the (x period)" to the public address system.

== Use in the arts ==
Beside sporting events, starter pistols are also used in films and in TV, stage shows, and to record impulse responses.

== Criminal use ==
Some pistols made to fire only blanks can be converted to fire live ammunition. Such makeshift firearms are used in crime and many are illegal to possess in certain jurisdictions.

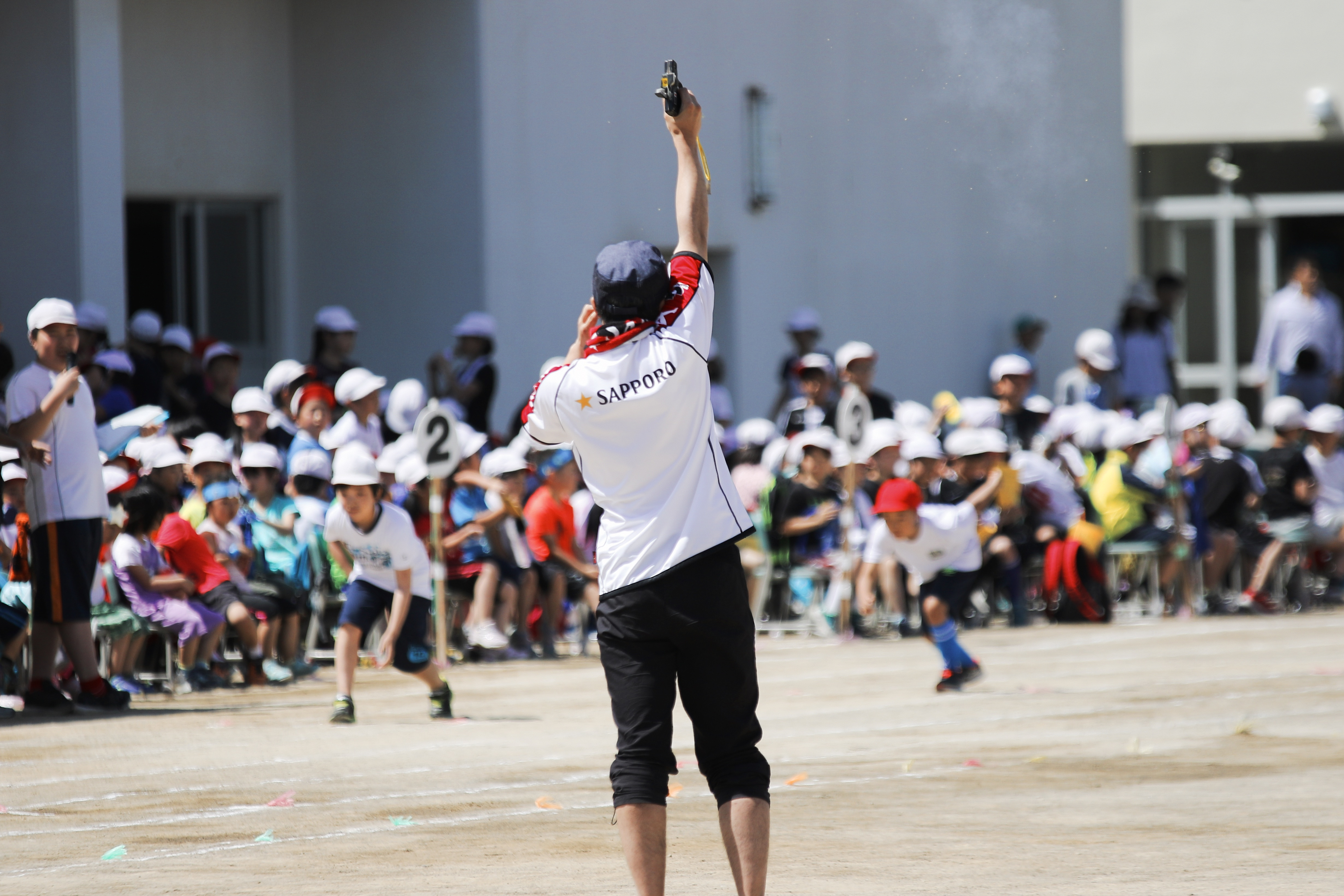
An athletic festival

== See also ==
Incidents involving starting pistols

- 2010 Discovery, Inc. hostage crisis
- 2016 Munich shooting
- Adam Ant 2002 pub incident in Camden
- Algiers Motel incident
- David Kang
- LOT Flight 165 hijacking
- Lufthansa Flight 592
