= Rofe Park Turramurra =

Australian nature park in Ku-ring-gai Council

Coordinates: 33°44′53″S 151°07′26″E

Rofe Park Turramurra is an area of natural native bushland of approximately 50 acres (20.23 hectares) gifted to Ku-ring-gai by the Rofe family in 1927. Located on the Upper North Shore of Sydney, New South Wales, Australia, the park is part of an unbroken three-kilometre-long stretch of bushland (Sheldon Forest, Rofe Park and Comenarra Creek Reserve) that connects the Pacific Highway with Lane Cove National Park in South Turramurra. It is owned and maintained by Ku-ring-gai Council.

There are two Rofe Parks: Rofe Park Hornsby Heights is located in the Hornsby Shire Council Local Government Area. Both parks were donated to the public by Thomas Ernest Rofe and his family.

== History ==
=== Aboriginal heritage ===
It is possible this Rofe Park was where the indigenous clan of the Darramurragal lived. Their language may have been of the Darug coastal dialect or similar.

=== Post 1857 ===
The area of 50 acres was advertised by the Crown as Lot 2 on 4 February 1857 and was selected by William Gannon. A land grant was issued to him on 5 September 1877. Following his death, his widow Helena Gannon sold the land to Minnie Edith Rofe (Minnie Edith Hilder, 1870–1949).

According to the NSW Land Registry, 50 acres of the land was purchased by Minnie Edith Rofe on 20 July 1904. Minnie subsequently declared that she held it in trust for her husband, Thomas Ernest Rofe (1869-1945). The two of them joined in a transfer of the land to the Council of the Shire of Ku-ring-gai on 13 April 1927.

Thomas and Minnie Rofe were living in Wahroonga, Sydney in 1927 when they gave the 50 acres of land to the Council of the Shire of Ku-ring-gai.

In the Sydney Morning Herald article dated 6 April 1927, Councillor Thistlethwayte, president of Ku-ring-gai Shire said:

"This generous act on Mr. Rofe’s part, is being consummated to-night in the transfer of the property to the council, and the execution of a deed of trust by the council, so that the area will for all time be an open space in which the preservation of the natural fauna and flora will be a dominant feature. The land is well wooded and includes a natural cave unsurpassed in the metropolitan area."

The deed to the park is held by Ku-ring-gai Council and mentions the Rofe family's dedication.

Rofe Park opened on 24 May 1927, Mr and Mrs Rofe were present. Thomas said that his decision to dedicate the area as a park was as a result of reading a report of the Society for the Preservation of Wildlife, and of the impression he received while travelling through the USA where parks had been donated to local communities.

== Bushland characteristics ==
Rofe Park Turramurra has a combination land zoning of C2 (Environmental Conservation) and RE1 (Public Recreation). It is rated as Bushfire Prone Land. Its soils are classified Acid Sulphate category 5.

Rofe Park is an existing Biodiversity Stewardship Site within Ku-ring-gai. The natural bush corridor that includes Sheldon Forest, Rofe Park and Comenarra Creek Reserve form a State BioBanking site. The Avondale Creek flows through the park, and there are two waterfalls (from different branches of the creek) and natural caves.

=== Geology ===
Rofe Park is a typical Hawkesbury Sandstone (Sydney sandstone) valley, 70 metres deep with steep rocky sides and spanning the upper third of the approximately 230 metre thick Hawkesbury Sandstone formation. The sandstone is overlain by the alternating thin sandstones, siltstones and laminites of the 2-10 metre thick Mittagong Formation which survives on the valley shoulders.

=== Vegetation ===
Coachwood Ceratopetalum apetalum forest follows the rocky creek lines of the narrow valley bottoms and ravines. Other tree species include Grey Myrtle Backhousia myrtifolia, notably upstream from Avondale Dam. The cool, shady character means ground flora is mainly ferns or absent, though there are many seasonal fungi. Fern species are diverse, especially around the two waterfalls. The dominant tree species of the valley sides is blackbutt (Eucalyptus pilularis), locally exceeding 30 metres in height. It is accompanied by turpentines (Syncarpia glomulifera) and Sydney Red Gums (Angophora costata), as well as Sydney peppermints (Eucalyptus piperita) and black sheoaks (Allocasuarina littoralis) on higher slopes. The park includes the critically endangered ecological community of Blue Gum High Forest that is mainly located in Sheldon Forest to the north-east of Rofe Park.

=== Animal species ===
Regular Australian native bird visitors include the yellow-tailed black cockatoo, sulphur crested cockatoo, galah, Australian king parrot, rainbow lorikeet, crimson rosella, red wattlebird, laughing kookaburra, australian magpie, Pacific koel, grey butcherbird, pied currawong, tawny frogmouth, Southern boobook, white-headed pigeon, channel-billed cuckoo and superb fairywren.

Land based Australian native animals include the common brushtail possum and ringtail possums (Pseudocheiridae), sugar glider, long-nosed bandicoot, bush rat, swamp wallaby, short-beaked echidna, eastern Australian water dragon, red-bellied black snake, eastern brown snake and green tree snake (Dendrelaphis punctulatus).

Several threatened species are known to live in the area, such as the red-crowned toadlet, gang-gang cockatoo, powerful owl, Eastern bent-wing bat, Eastern freetail bat (Micronomus), yellow-bellied sheath-tailed bat and grey-headed flying-fox. The powerful owl can roost in the dark, protective canopies of coachwoods and turpentines.

=== Walking tracks ===
There are several walking tracks through Rofe Park and nearby Sheldon Forest. They vary in grades from easy around Mimosa Oval to more difficult heading up to Warragal Road and Sheldon Forest or across to Troon Place in Pymble.

== Sport and recreation ==
Mimosa Oval, located to the south of the park, is a sports ground and an informal recreational space used by the community. It is a home ground for the amateur clubs Kissing Point Cricket Club in summer and West Pymble Football Club in winter. The ground includes public toilets and a children's playground. South Turramurra Scout Hall is located nearby at the end of Kate St, home of the 2nd Turramurra Scouts.
