= Anderson Park, Neutral Bay =

Park in New South Wales, Australia

Anderson Park
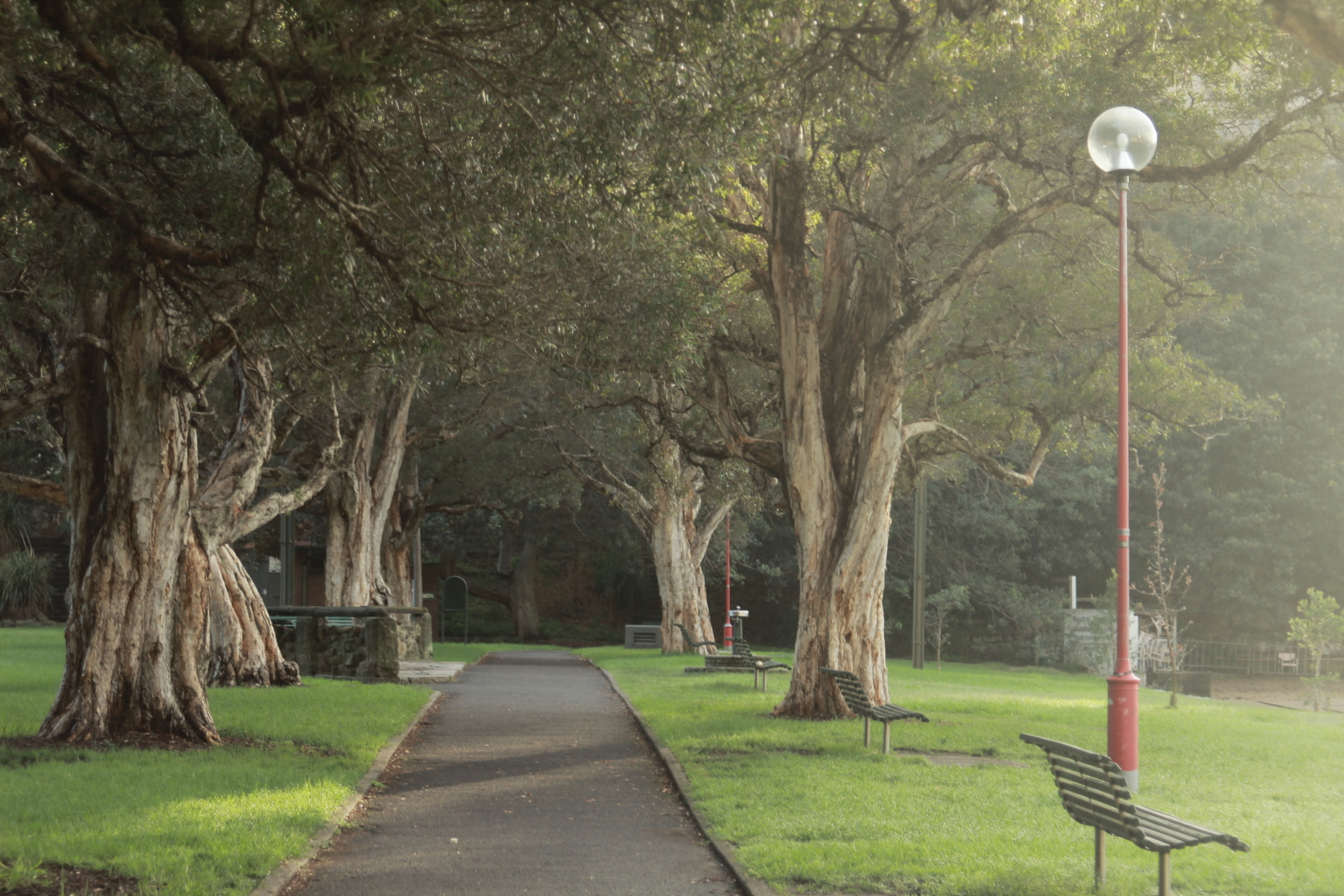
- Anderson Park path lined with weeping figs
- Interactive map of Anderson Park
- Location: Neutral Bay, Sydney, New South Wales, Australia
- Coordinates: 33°50′24″S 151°12′54″E
- Area: Neutral Bay
- Created: 8 October 1899
- Status: Public

Anderson Park is an urban recreation park located in the Sydney suburb of Neutral Bay, New South Wales, Australia. The park is located on the shore of the bay in Sydney Harbour from which the suburb is named.

Anderson Park is built on land reclaimed from the bay in the 1890s, and was dedicated on 8 October 1899. It was originally called Warringa Park, but was renamed in 1926 in honor of William Anderson who was the Mayor of the local municipality of North Sydney from 1914 to 1918.

A floodlit sports field is available for cricket; various codes of football; volleyball; and other activities. There are pathways, sandstone flagging, a depression-era concrete wall and a small beach. The main path through the park is lined with Hill's weeping figs.

== Significant events ==
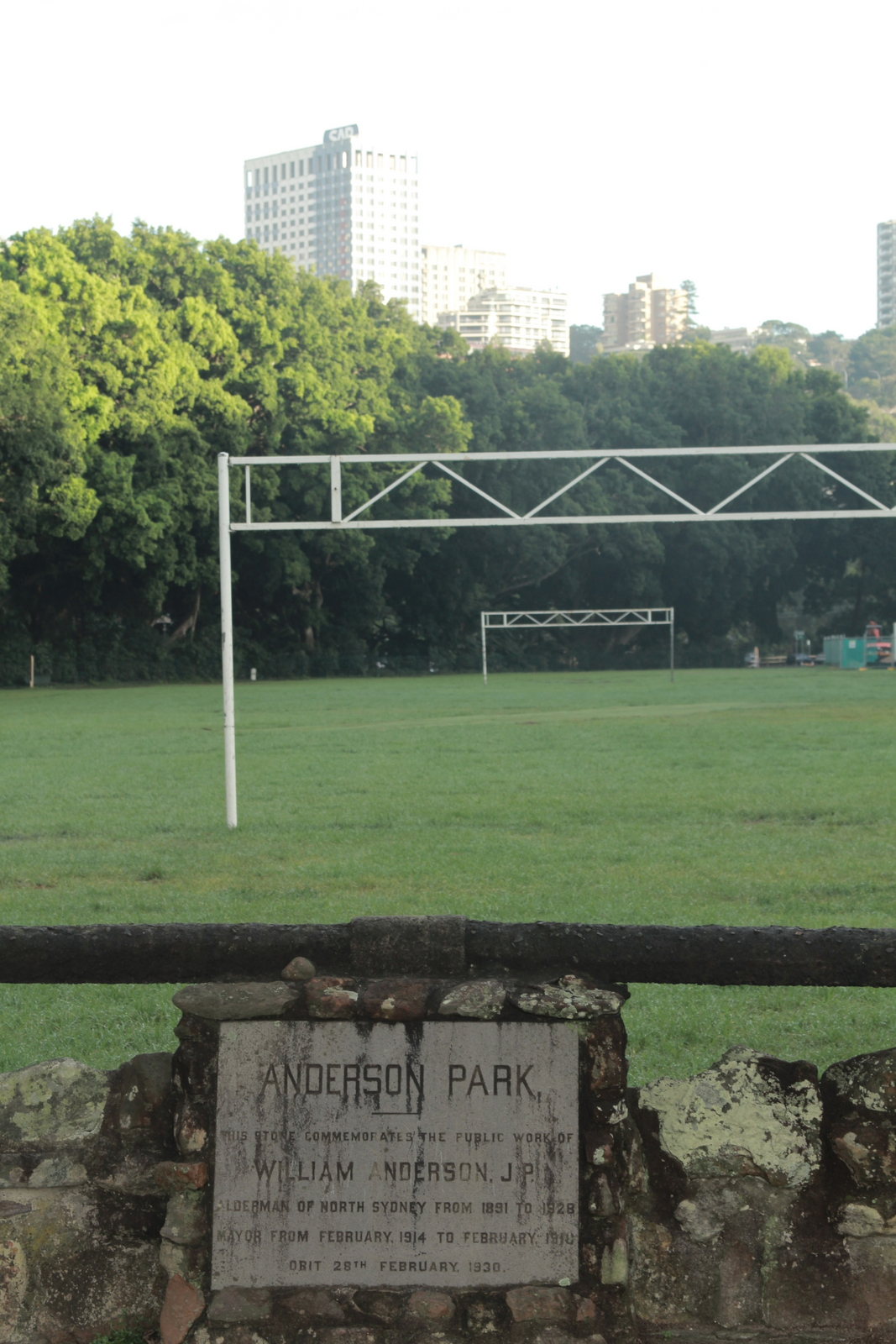
Anderson Park sports field, where in 1934, Charles Kingsford Smith took off in a Lockheed Altair.

On 17 July 1934, thousands gathered in Anderson Park to watch as Charles Kingsford Smith and Captain Patrick Gordon Taylor took off from there in their single-engined Lockheed Altair for a promotional flight over Sydney. Originally, they had planned to take off from the middle of Macquarie Street in Sydney, but when the local council denied permission, they transported their aeroplane by barge to Neutral Bay. The Altair had recently been shipped from America on the deck games court of the SS Mariposa, and had the word "ANZAC" painted on the side, though this had to be covered with brown paper due to Australian law prohibiting the use of this word for commercial purposes. The aeroplane was hastily renamed the Lady Southern Cross.

== See also ==
- List of parks in Sydney
