= Angophora Reserve =

Park in Sydney, Australia

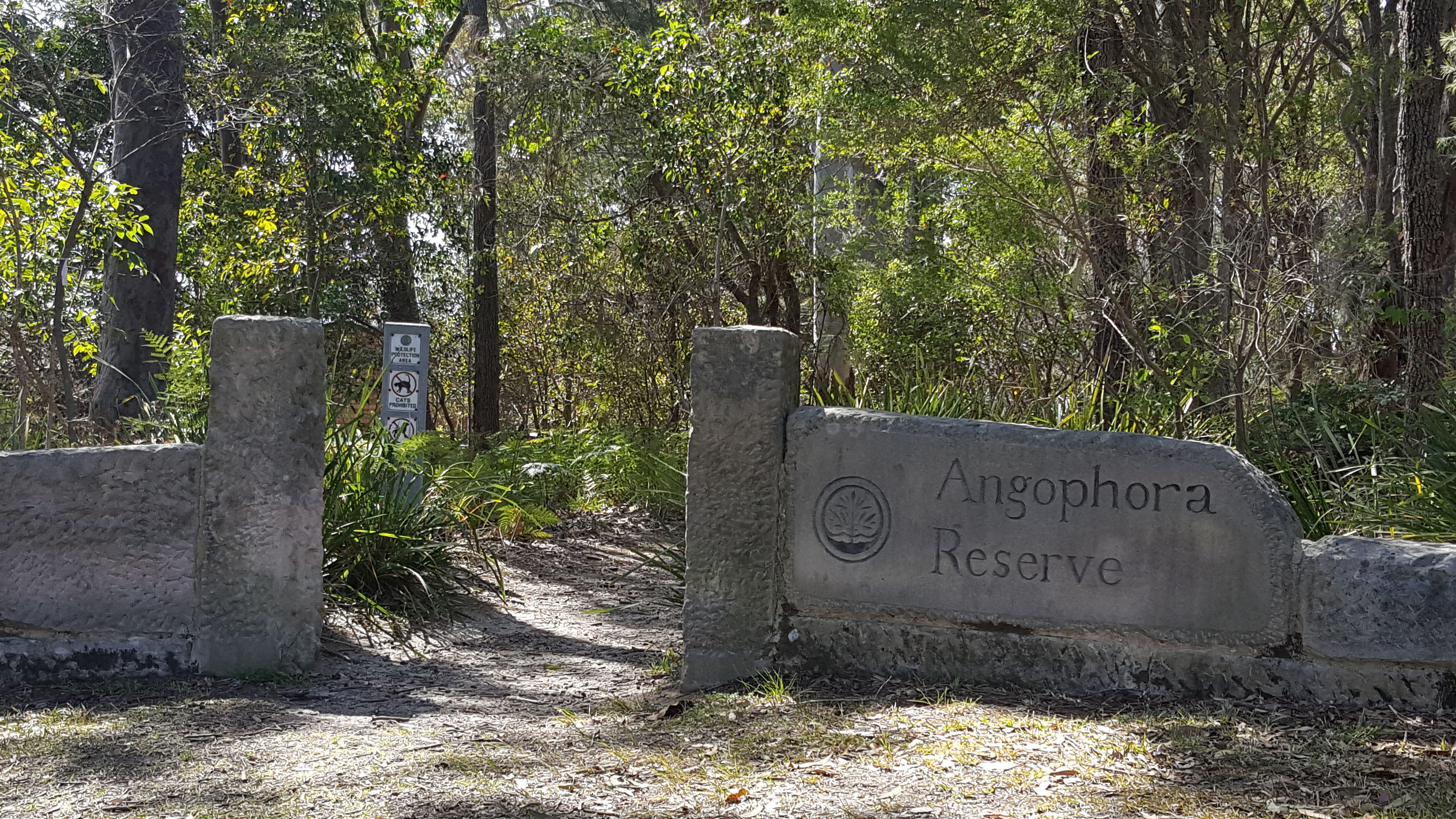
- Entrance to Angophora Reserve
- Interactive map of Angophora Reserve
- Type: Urban park
- Location: Northern Beaches, Sydney, New South Wales, Australia
- Coordinates: 33°38′19″S 151°18′56″E
- Area: 18.5 hectares (46 acres)
- Created: 19 March 1939
- Operator: Northern Beaches Council
- Status: Open all year

Angophora Reserve is a 18.5-hectare (46-acre) nature preserve located in the Northern Beaches region of Sydney, in the state of New South Wales. It was once two adjacent reserves formally known as Hudson Park and Angophora Reserve, however the two were merged and are now referred together under the one title of Angophora Reserve. It borders the suburbs of Avalon Beach, Clareville and Taylors Point and provides a refuge for native fauna and flora and serves as a wildlife corridor. The reserve also contains an Aboriginal shelter site that holds both archaeological and cultural significance and is one of the most important of such sites in the Sydney region.

== History ==
Angophora Reserve was purchased as a bushland sanctuary by the Wildlife Preservation Society in 1937. The reserve's original purpose was to preserve a giant Angophora Red Gum tree, which is estimated to be 1,000 years old. The tree still stands today but is now dead. Sir Philip Whistler Street officially opened the reserve on 19 March 1938 during an opening ceremony that took place under the giant Angophora tree. The adjoining Hudson Park was established as a public reserve in 1957.

The Angophora Reserve and Hudson Park Management Committee was formed in 1976 to aid in the management of the neighbouring reserves. It remained active until it was disbanded after the Council elections in September 1991 and was succeeded by the Pittwater Reserves and Bushland Management Committee following the creation of the Pittwater Council.

In 1989 Angophora Reserve and Hudson Park were registered on the now defunct Register of the National Estate in 1987 due to it being a bushland sanctuary of significant social, recreational and educational value to the Northern Beaches region.

== See also ==
- List of parks in Sydney
