= Rofe Park =

Bushland reserve in New South Wales, Australia

Coordinates: 33.680516°S 151.099245°E

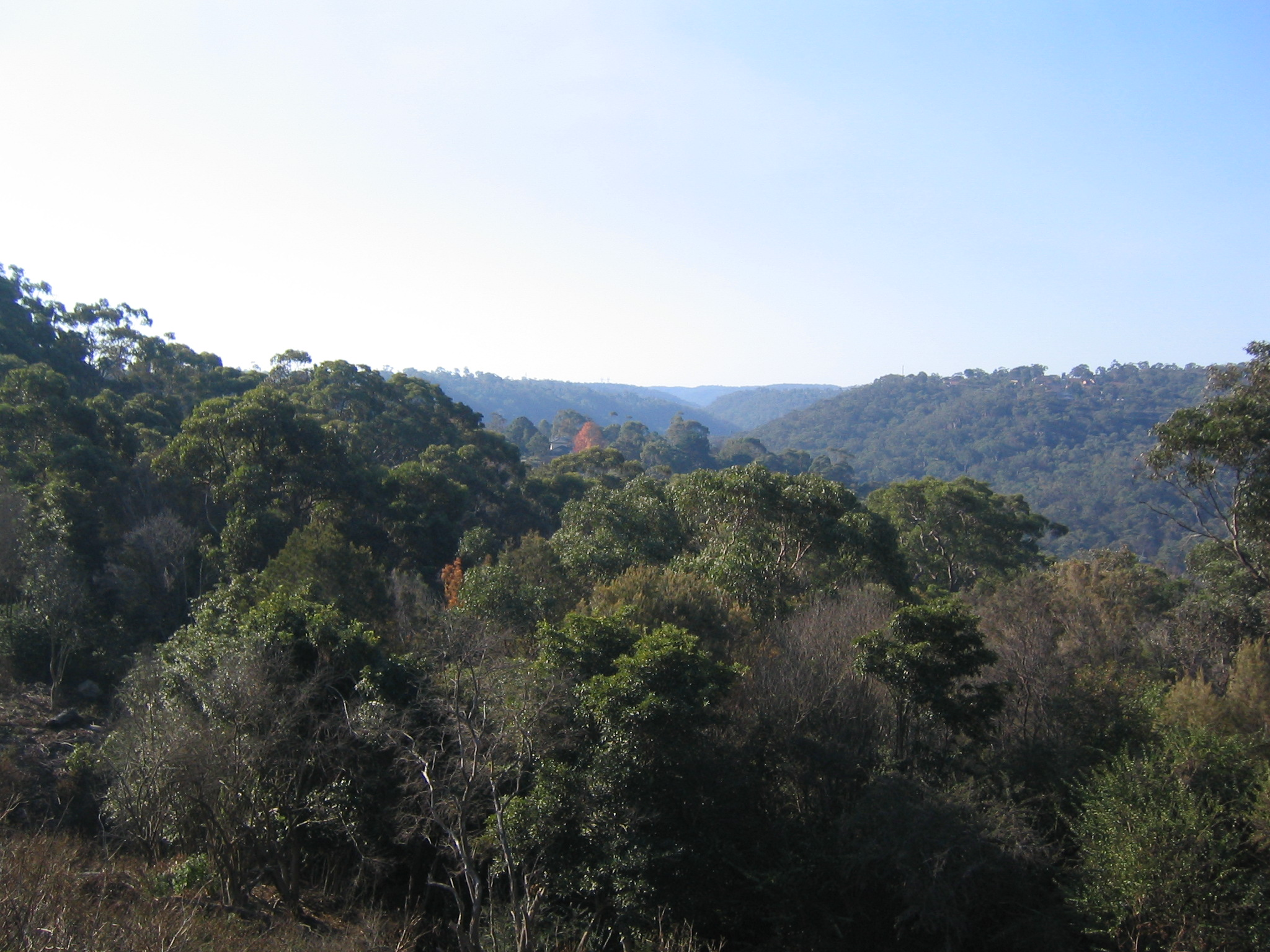
The view from Rofe Park across Hornsby Heights and Mount Colah.

Rofe Park Hornsby Heights is a bushland reserve in New South Wales, Australia. It has a heritage listing of local significance.

This district park is located on Galston Road in Hornsby Heights. It is on Crown land and is maintained by Hornsby Shire Council.

There are two Rofe Parks: Rofe Park Turramurra is located in the nearby Ku-ring-gai Council Local Government Area. Both parks were donated to the public by Thomas Ernest Rofe and his family.

== History ==
Rofe Park was named after Councillor Thomas Ernest Rofe (born 15 June 1869).

Rofe was a Sydney-based philanthropist and President of Hornsby Shire Council who donated land for Hornsby Hospital that was to be situated on the land that is now Rofe Park.

Archaeologist Margrit Koettig reported in 1996 that Rofe Park contains no known Aboriginal relics.

== Facilities ==
The main oval is laid out with a number of baseball diamonds. Baseball is played during summer and Aussie Rules football during winter. For training purposes, the playing area can be lit using a number of light poles, fitted with QI lamps. Surrounding the main oval is a 717 metre long concrete path that is used for walking and cycling. There are also playgrounds, a synpave tennis court, and an off-leash dog area.

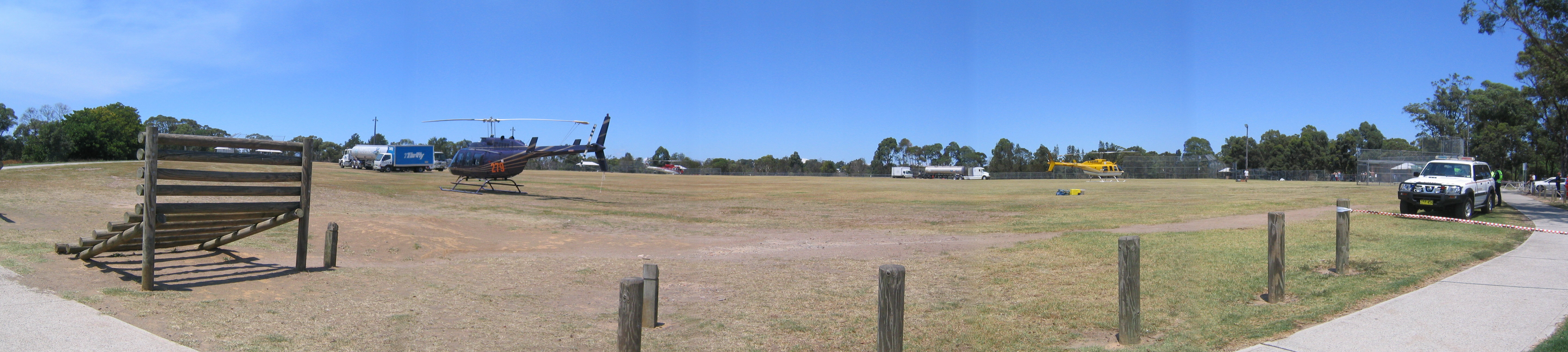
A temporary helicopter landing pad set up on Rofe Park during the bushfire in the Ku-ring-gai Chase National Park in January 2007. Helicopters and refueling tanks are visible in this photograph.

== Mobile Phone Tower ==
As of 2008, Telstra has applied to install a mobile phone tower in the park. The application is being opposed by a number of residents of the area.

The tower and associated equipment hut were installed in June and July 2009. The 30 metre tower features a compact 2100 MHz 3g Antenna array above the field lighting.
