= Steiner Schools Australia =

Independent private schools in Australia

Steiner Education Australia
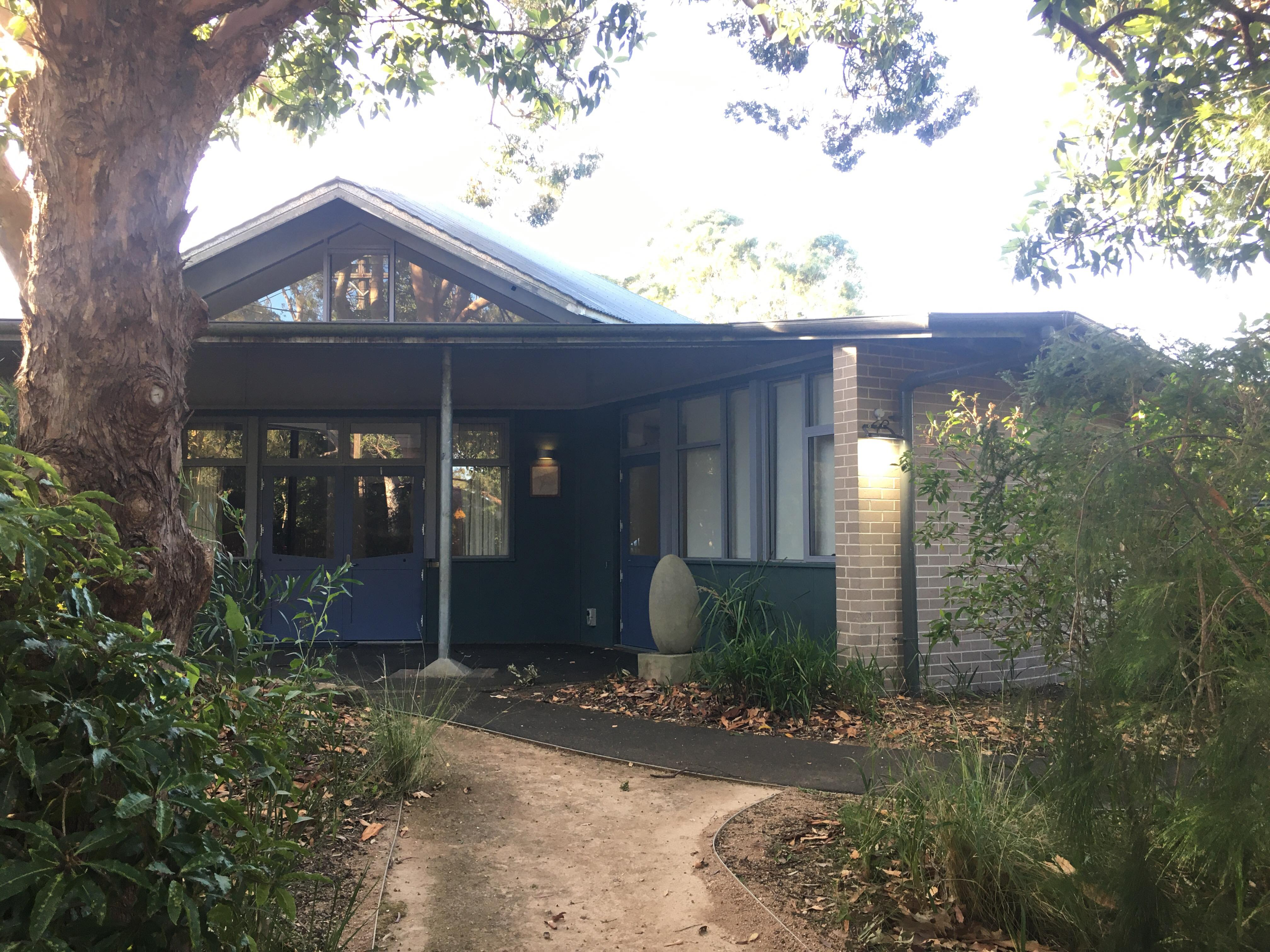
- Abbreviation: SEA
- Predecessor: Rudolf Steiner Schools Association
- Formation: 1980
- Type: Private and Public
- Headquarters: Chatswood, NSW, Australia
- Members: 45 member schools, 16 associate member schools and colleges
- Official language: English
- Website: www.steinereducation.edu.au

Steiner Schools Australia refers to the independent, private body of kindergarten, primary and secondary schools based on the Waldorf education system across Australia. Steiner Education operates in over 50 locations across the various states and territories in Australia, providing educational playgroups, kindergartens, primary schools and comprehensive K-12 school programs. Steiner Education is recognised by the Australian Curriculum Assessment and Reporting Authority (ACARA) as an ‘alternative’ form of education and operates mainly within private independent schools with a small presence within public schools as Steiner streams. Steiner schools in Australia are represented by Steiner Education Australia, a not-for-profit organisation. Steiner Education has also attracted debate and criticism for its similarities to religious forms of education from the various states and territories.

== Overview ==
In Australia there are 62 Steiner schools with a total enrolment of 11,391 students. The mean number of students per school is 184. There are Steiner schools in all six Australian states: (New South Wales, n=21; Victoria, n=16; Queensland, n=8; Western Australia, n=8; South Australia, n=4; Tasmania, n=2), and in the two territories (Northern Territory, n=2; Australian Capital Territory, n=1).

One third of Steiner schools in Australia offer the full range of primary plus secondary classes (i.e. K-12) (n=21); a further third of Steiner schools offer the full range of primary classes (i.e. K-6) (n=21); a final third of Steiner school (n=20) offer some other variation of classes.

Of the 62 Steiner schools in Australia, 41 bear the name ‘Steiner’ (n=34) or ‘Rudolf Steiner’ (n=7); a small number bear the name ‘Waldorf’ (n=4); some others are not differentiated by either ‘Steiner’ nor ‘Waldorf’ (n=8); in addition, some State schools offer a ‘Steiner stream’ nested within a government school (n=9).

== Origins and History ==
=== Origin of Steiner Education ===
Dr Rudolf Steiner (1861-1925) and Emil Molt (1876-1936) jointly founded the original Waldorf School in Stuttgart, Germany in 1919 in the midst of the turmoil of post-WWI Germany. Rudolf Steiner provided the pedagogy and Emil Molt provided the funds.

The Stuttgart school was the prototype for a new alternative education movement, viz. Waldorf education. Since then, Steiner schools (aka Waldorf schools) have proliferated across the globe, with 3142 schools and kindergartens in 74 countries.

=== Foundations ===
The growth of the Waldorf movement in the Australian context originated from the influence of key members involved with the Anthroposophical Society of Australia. In the 1920-40s, networking and interaction between members within the Anthroposophical Society brought about growth and interest in the implementation of the Waldorf philosophy into the Australian context. Early members of the Society were involved in small grassroots movements that were passed onto other individuals through word of mouth, who in turn shared their interests and enthusiasm of Rudolf Steiner values with more individuals through word of mouth.

Discussion and inspiration for starting up the first Rudolf Steiner school was co-founded by Society members Eric Nicholls and Sylvia Brose. Nicholls and his wife Mary moved to live in Castlecrag to be close to Walter Burley and Marion Griffin, architects whom Nicholls had close associations with. Walter and Marion were already members of the Anthroposophical Society and as a result of their influence, Nicholls joined in 1934. Lute Drummond, one of the founding members of the Anthroposophical Society, retired from the position of General Secretary in 1910, and Nicholls took up the position after her retirement.

Brose’s introduction to the Society had been through her connections with Alice Crowther, an early member who had set up the first Steiner inspired Speech and Eurythmy studio in Sydney in 1941. Brose had been one of Crowther’s first students and would later join the Anthroposophical Society as a result of her and Lute Drummond’s influence. She and Nicholls would later meet through Anthroposophical meetings and at performances at the amphitheatre in Castlecrag. Brose would later become the educational founder, driving force and inspiration for the first Steiner School alongside Nicholls’ direction and planning.

=== Origins of Dalcross and Glenaeon ===
During the late 1930s, Marion Griffin and Mary Nicholls ran a small number of kindergarten classes for a few years based on Steiner Education at their home in Castlecrag (Grace, 1999 in Mowday, 2004, p. 32). It was not until 1951 that the idea of forming a school develop formally at a meeting with Eric Nicholls, Sylvia Brose and other members of the Anthroposophical Society. It was proposed that Brose would undertake training in Waldorf education in Edinburgh and then return to Sydney to begin a school. An existing kindergarten school named ‘Dalcross’ in Pymble was bought in 1956. With Brose’s return from Edinburgh, she took charge of the foundation class at Dalcross.

Dalcross had its first class in 1957 and added a new kindergarten class each year, with close to 70 students by 1960. Brose’s teacher training in Waldorf education and her educational experiences at Frensham and Bellevue Hill allowed for the Steiner pedagogy to be formed amidst the establishment of the new school. As the only teacher for the first two years at Dalcross, Brose was paid six pounds a week and was also the cleaner, school secretary and lecturer on Steiner Education. She would later describe her first five years of teaching at Dalcross as ‘like a fairytale’ due to the magic of the children she taught. In honour of her work as the educational founder of the first Steiner school in Australia, Brose was later recognised with the school hall at Glenaeon Rudolf Steiner School (Sylvia Brose Hall) being named in her honour at its opening in 1985.

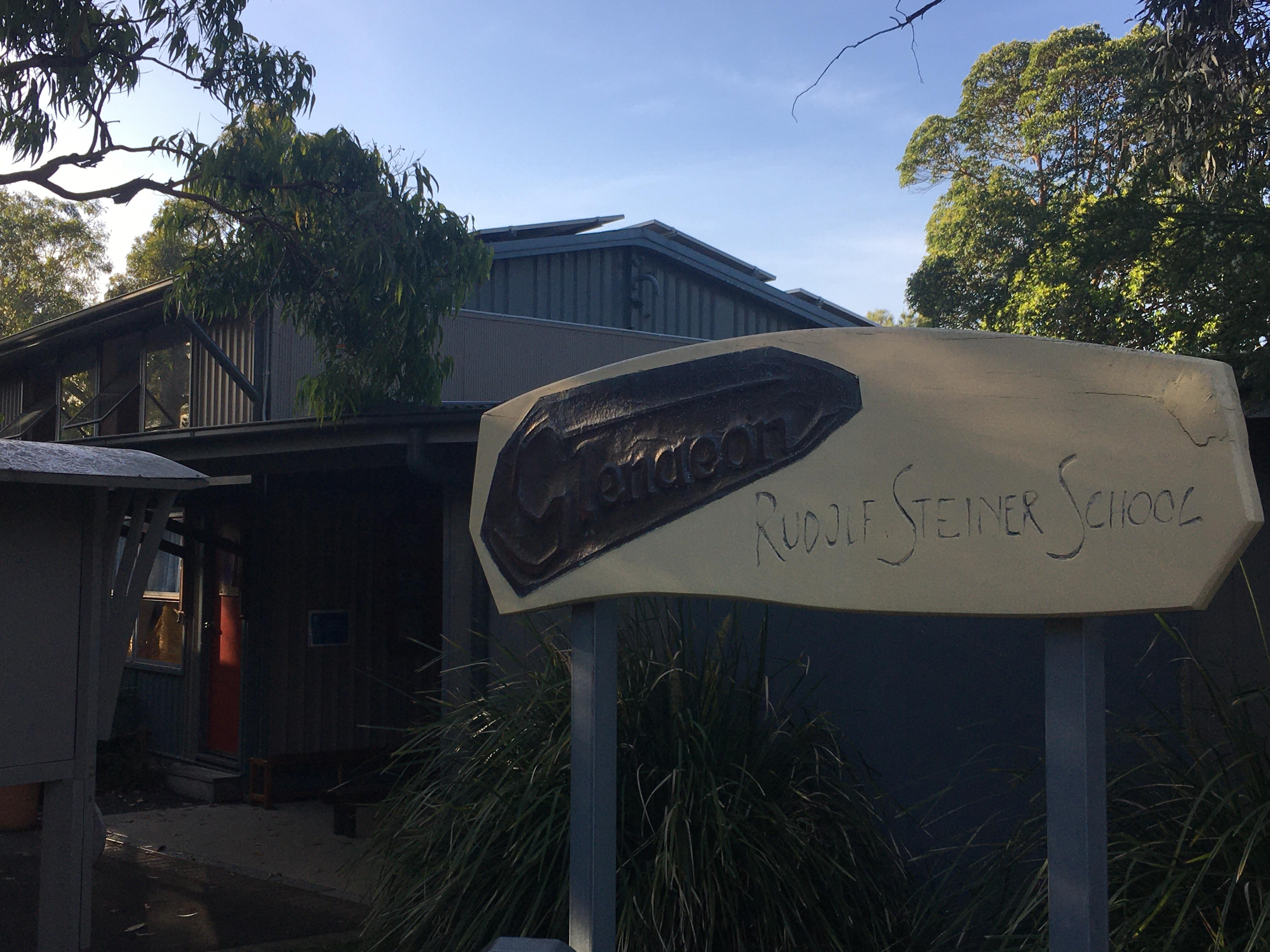
The first Australian Rudolf Steiner School, Glenaeon Rudolf Steiner School

The property was sold by the Society and the money was used to secure a site for the school based in Middle Cove. The property was called by the Scottish name ‘Glenaeon’, and as a result the additional campus was also given the name Glenaeon. With the expansion of the original school at Dalcross nearing its limits and the added pressure of school funding, Eric Nicholls made plans to design and construct the first building at the Middle Cove campus in 1961. By 1963, a second classroom building was added and after five years at Dalcross, the existing students were moved to Glenaeon. Nicholl’s vision and planning by the end of 1966 would also result in the completion of a third building at Glenaeon, consisting of the Senior classrooms and a Science Laboratory. By 1973, all of the younger classes at Dalcross were transferred across to the Glenaeon campus to form one site. The establishment of the school structure across Dalcross and at Glenaeon would later form the first Rudolf Steiner School in Australia.

=== Growth from the 1960s - 2000s ===
The number of Rudolf Steiner Schools increased from five schools in 1985 to thirty-seven by the end of 1991. The creation of a Steiner Schools association in Australia was proposed in 1979. The subsequent meeting in 1980 for the proposal of an association was held at Lorien Novalis and its outcome established the Rudolf Steiner Schools Association (RSSA). The creation of the RSSA stood as a representative and advocate for the growing Steiner movement in Australia. In particular, the concerns of the association focused on teacher training standards and was responsible for the growth of the younger pioneer schools.

RSSA meetings were held at different schools throughout the 1980s and were made open to all Steiner teachers. Attendance at its events were encouraged by Steiner members. These meetings functioned as a forum for sharing achievements and difficulties faced by each individual Steiner school. They also worked in supporting applications for permanent residence status for overseas Steiner teachers looking to migrate to Australia. It was a place for individual schools to advertise employment opportunities, cultural exchanges, intra-school support and invite members to conferences. In 1984, a one-year Steiner teacher training course was also introduced to which students could undertake teaching practice in various Steiner schools and educational training in Anthroposophy at Parsifal College. The course was later extended to two years full time. The RSSA was also given the role of official delegates to the various State Departments of Education as the need for Steiner curriculum to be recognised increased. As a result, their work centred on defining a Steiner Education framework and standards which would suit the demands by the State Governments.

The RSSA functioned to promote Steiner Education and support new Steiner schools by building intra-school connections during the 1990s. In 1994, the RSSA hosted the first National Teacher’s conference in Byron Bay where Steiner teachers throughout Australia met to share their ideas and experiences. Since the 1990s, Steiner streams have been introduced in public primary schools which occur as a result of parent group initiatives. In 2011, the RSSA changed its name to Steiner Education Australia (SEA). In addition to Steiner streams, the establishment of Rudolf Steiner curriculum and pedagogy has allowed new innovations including adult education and teacher training associations.

Since the early 2000s, Steiner schools in Australia have continued to grow in popularity as an alternative form of education, with new schools being established over the last decade in Moreton Bay (Queensland), Bairnsdale (Victoria) and Bowral (New South Wales). In a 2016 report by the ABC, the Cape Byron Rudolf Steiner School reported extensive waiting lists of more than 500. In Queensland, a Graduate Certificate and Masters Degree in Steiner education has also been introduced at the University of the Sunshine Coast.

== Schools By State ==
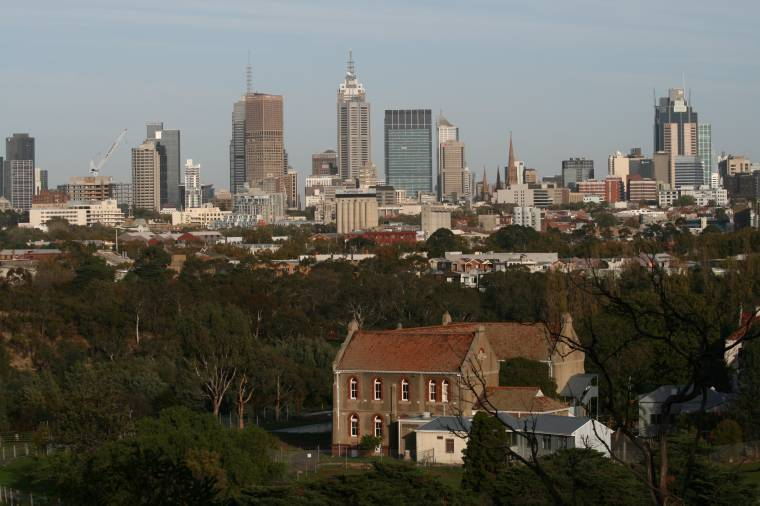
A Melbourne based Rudolf Steiner School (Sophia Mundi Steiner School)

Featured below is a list of the various Waldorf/Rudolf Steiner Schools and associate schools with Steiner streams in Australia according to the data published by ACARA on the My School website.

List of NSW Rudolf Steiner and Associate Steiner Stream Schools
Name	Suburb	Year Range	Sector
Aetaomah Steiner School	Terragon	Kindergarten to Year 8	Non-Government
Armidale Waldorf School	Armidale	Preschool, Kindergarten to Year 8	Non-Government
Aurora Southern Highlands Steiner School	Bowral	Pre Kinder to Year 9	Non-Government
Blue Mountains Steiner School	Hazelbrook	Preschool to Year 6	Non-Government
Cape Byron Rudolf Steiner School	Byron Bay	Kindergarten to Year 12	Non-Government
Casuarina Steiner School	Coffs Harbour	Preschool to Year 6	Non-Government
Chrysalis Steiner School	Thora	Kindergarten to Year 8	Non-Government
Glenaeon Rudolf Steiner School	Middle Cove	Preschool to Year 12	Non-Government
Kamaroi Rudolf Steiner School	Belrose	Kindergarten to Year 6	Non-Government
Kindlehill School for Rudolf Steiner Education	Wentworth Falls	Pre Kinder to Year 10	Non-Government
Linuwel School	East Maitland	Preschool to Year 12	Non-Government
Lorien Novalis School	Dural	Preschool to Year 12	Non-Government
Mumbulla School for Rudolf Steiner Education	Bega	Kindergarten to Year 6	Non-Government
Newcastle Waldorf School	Glendale	Kindergarten to Year 12	Non-Government
Port Macquarie Steiner School	Port Macquarie	Kindergarten to Year 3	Non-Government
Rainbow Ridge School for Rudolf Steiner Education	Lillian Rock	Kindergarten to Year 8	Non-Government
Shearwater the Mullumbimby Steiner School	Mullumbimby	Preschool to Year 12	Non-Government
Tallowood Steiner School	Bowraville	Kindergarten to Year 6	Non-Government
The Alpine School	Cooma	Kindergarten to Year 6	Non-Government
Warrah Specialist School	Dural	Kindergarten to Year 12	Non-Government

List of VIC Rudolf Steiner and Associate Steiner Stream Schools
Name	Suburb	Year Range	Sector
Ballarat Steiner School and Kindergarten	Mount Helen	Kindergarten to Year 6	Non-Government
Briar Hill Primary School	Briar Hill	Preschool to Year 6 (Steiner Stream)	Government
Castlemaine Steiner School	Muckleford	Kindergarten to Year 8	Non-Government
Dandenong Ranges Steiner School	Emerald	Kindergarten to Year 6	Non-Government
East Bentleigh Primary School	Bentleigh East	Kindergarten to Year 6 (Steiner Stream)	Government
Freshwater Creek Steiner School	Freshwater Creek	Pre Kinder to Year 6	Non-Government
Ghilgai Steiner School	Kilsyth	Kindergarten to Year 6	Non-Government
Little Yarra Steiner School	Yarra Junction	Kindergarten to Year 12	Non-Government
Mansfield Steiner School	Mansfield	Kindergarten to Year 12, IB Diploma	Non-Government
Melbourne Rudolf Steiner School	Warranwood	Kindergarten to Year 12	Non-Government
Mornington Park Primary School	Mornington	Kindergarten to Year 6 (Steiner Stream)	Government
Sophia Mundi Steiner School	Abbotsford	Prep to Year 12	Non-Government
Taraleigh Steiner Preschool	Bentleigh East	Preschool	Non-Government
Thornbury Primary School	Thornbury	Preschool to Year 6 (Steiner Stream)	Government
Wild Cherry School	Bairnsdale	Kindergarten to Year 6	Non-Government

List of WA Rudolf Steiner and Associate Steiner Stream Schools
Name	Suburb	Year Range	Sector
Golden Hill Steiner School	Denmark	Kindergarten to Year 6	Non-Government
Helena River Steiner School	Midland	Pre Kinder to Year 6	Non-Government
Leaning Tree Steiner School	Geraldton	Kindergarten to Year 7	Non-Government
Perth Waldorf School	Bibra Lake	Kindergarten to Year 12	Non-Government
Silver Tree Steiner School	Parkerville	Kindergarten to Year 9	Non-Government
West Coast Steiner School	Nollamara	Kindergarten to Year 6	Non-Government
Yallingup Steiner School	Yallingup	Kindergarten to Year 6	Non-Government

List of QLD Rudolf Steiner and Associate Steiner Stream Schools
Name	Suburb	Year Range	Sector
Benowa State High School	Benowa	Year 7, 8, 9 (Steiner Stream)	Government
Birali Steiner School	Beachmere	Kindergarten to Year 8	Non-Government
Cairns Hinterland Steiner School	Kuranda	Preschool to Year 10	Non-Government
Goora Gan Steiner School	Agnes Water	Preschool to Year 6	Non-Government
Noosa Pengari Steiner School	Doona	Prep to Year 12	Non-Government
Rose Rainbow Preschool and Kindergarten	Alexandra Hills	Birth to School Age	Non-Government
Samford Valley Steiner School	Wights Mountain	Kindergarten to Year 12	Non-Government

List of NT Rudolf Steiner and Associate Steiner Stream Schools
Name	Suburb	Year Range	Sector
Alice Springs Steiner School	Ross	Kindergarten to Year 8	Non-Government
Milkwood Steiner School	Berrimah	Kindergarten to Year 7	Non-Government

List of SA Rudolf Steiner and Associate Steiner Stream Schools
Name	Suburb	Year Range	Sector
Basket Range Primary School	Basket Range	Year 2 to Year 5 (Steiner Stream)	Government
Mount Barker Waldorf School	Mount Barker	Kindergarten to Year 12	Non-Government
Sheidow Park Primary School	Sheidow Park	Kindergarten to Year 6 (Steiner Stream)	Government
She Oak Steiner School	Port Lincoln	Playgroup to Preschool	Non-Government
Trinity Gardens School	Trinity Gardens	Kindergarten to Year 6 (Steiner Stream)	Government
Willunga Waldorf School	Willunga	Kindergarten to Year 12	Non-Government

List of TAS Rudolf Steiner and Associate Steiner Stream Schools
Name	Suburb	Year Range	Sector
Tamar Valley Steiner School	Launceston	Kindergarten to Year 6	Non-Government
Tarremah Steiner School	Huntingfield	Preschool to Year 10	Non-Government

List of ACT Rudolf Steiner and Associate Steiner Stream Schools
Name	Suburb	Year Range	Sector
Orana Steiner School	Weston	Kindergarten to Year 12	Non-Government

== Steiner Education Australia ==
Steiner Schools have been operating in Australia for more than 60 years and are growing in popularity locally and globally. In Australia, 17 new schools opened in the last decade, and Steiner-based streams have been being introduced to several state schools in South Australia and Victoria. There are more Steiner schools scheduled to open in 2020 and beyond.

The surge in interest is expected to increase further with Gonski 2.0 placing great emphasis on critical and creative thinking, social skills and problem solving – capabilities which the Steiner philosophy has long since cultivated.

Steiner Education Australia (SEA) is the not for profit national association/peak body representing over 50 Steiner/Waldorf schools and 16 Associate members throughout the states and territories of Australia. Each organisation is independent, but SEA provides a national voice to promote and support Steiner education in Australia. Its role is to promote and advocate Steiner values and education as well as negotiate between the demands of the national curriculum and Steiner education philosophy.

To uphold the pedagogy of Steiner education, Steiner Education Australia has developed the Australian Steiner Curriculum Framework (ASCF). The ASCF is recognised by the Australian Curriculum, Assessment and Reporting Authority (ACARA) as meeting the requirements of ACARA’s Australian Curriculum. This includes providing for students to learn the curriculum content and achieve standards described in Australian Curriculum documents.

Each school is an independent body and is registered with their state/territory regulatory authority.

Steiner Education Australia is self-funded and is recognised as a charity by the Australian Charities and Not-for-profits Commission (ACNC). It was first registered with the ACNC on the 3rd of December 2012. Their purpose as a charity has been listed as the ‘advancement of education’.

SEA continues to act as a representative body of the wider national Steiner Schools across Australia to navigate between government national curriculum requirements and Steiner Education curriculum. SEA represents 52 schools and also state schools with Steiner streams, as well as the Australian Association for Rudolf Steiner Early Childhood Education (AARSECE) which represent 30 preschools and kindergartens.

== Curriculum ==
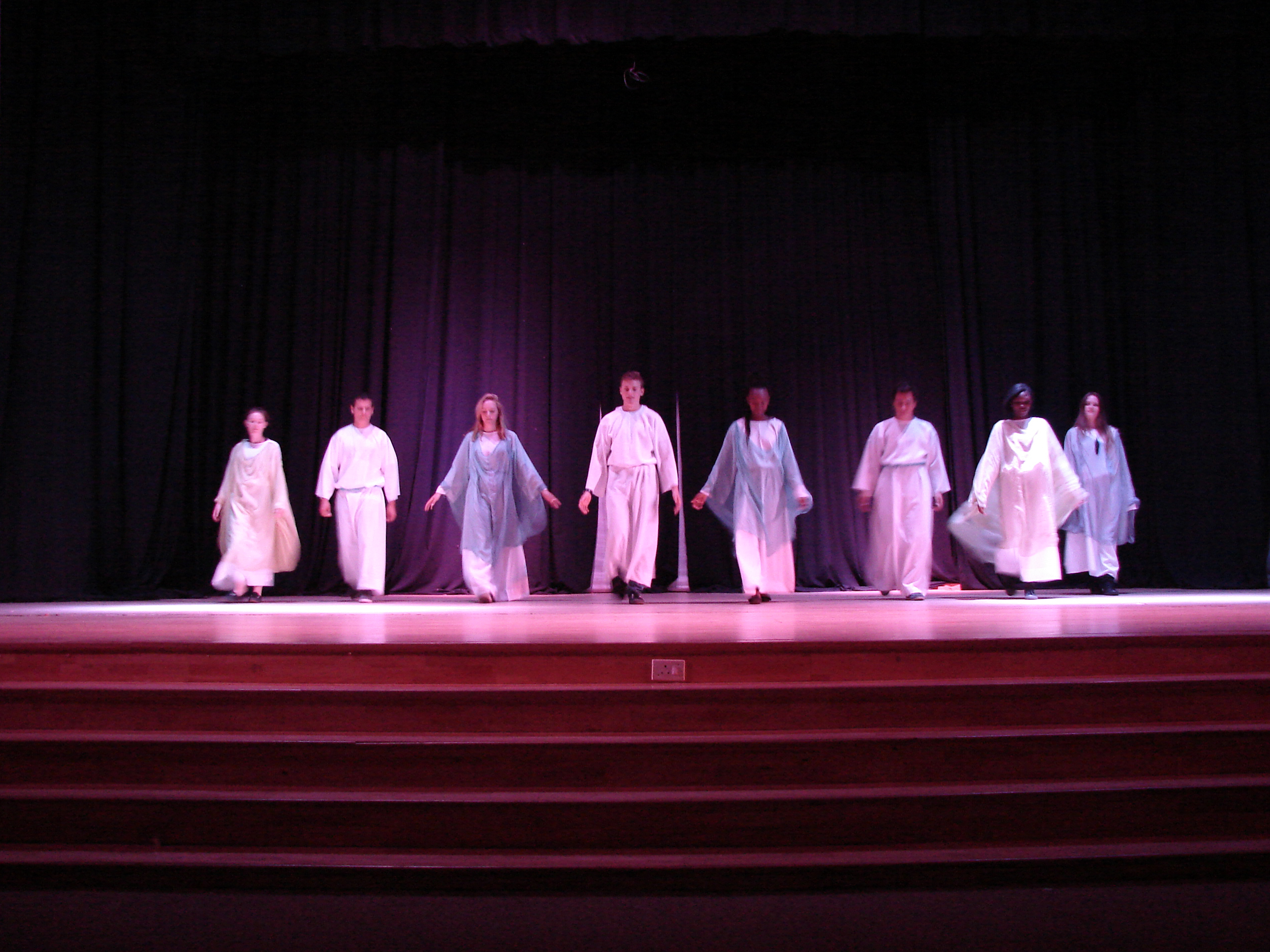
Students involved in a Eurythmy performance

Steiner schools in Australia teach according to the Australian Steiner Curriculum Framework (ASCF). This curriculum follows the format of the Waldorf school curriculum and is recognised by ACARA as providing comparable education outcomes to the Australian Curriculum Framework. In the subject areas of English, Mathematics, Science, History, Geography, Health and Physical Education, Technologies, Civics and Citizenship and the Arts, the ASCF modifies and shifts the sequencing of certain learning outcomes to be completed by the end of Year 10. Recognition for this modification was sought by SEA in 2011 for English, Mathematics, Science and History, 2014 for Geography, 2017 for Health and Physical Education, Technologies, the Arts and 2018 for Civics and Citizenship.

The requirement for students to use and learn about digital technologies in the curriculum are covered across Year 8–10 because the ASCF does not introduce students to digital technologies until the beginning of Year 8. Additionally, the learning area of eurythmy is recognised as part of The Arts section of the ASCF and the Australian Curriculum Framework.

== Criticism and Debate ==
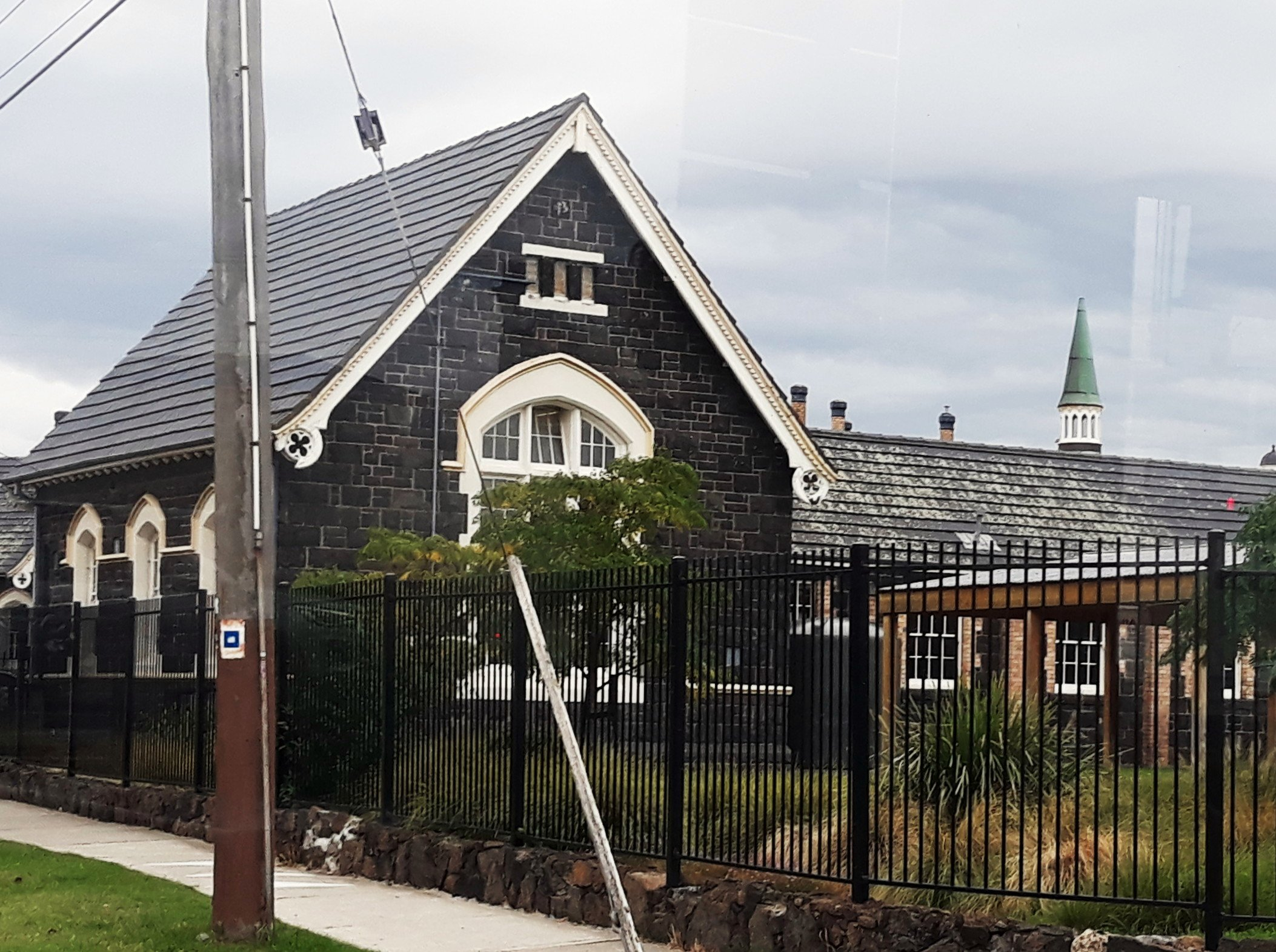
Footscray Primary School

In Victoria, criticism against the introduction of the Steiner stream at Footscray Primary School occurred in 2007 to 2008. Protests against the stream were held by members of the People For State Education (PFSE) amidst parental concern that Steiner education was a form of religious education which would be inappropriate in free, secular public education. This has been denied by Steiner educators who claim that the schooling curriculum is non-sectarian and non-denominational.

The Victorian Council of Schools Organisations president Jacinta Cashen also vocalised her belief that Steiner education should not be part of the state education system, stating that “Steiner schools are neither secular nor free – two cornerstones of public education – because they recite blessings and impost fees for activities such as music lessons and special materials like beeswax crayons”. The stream at Footscray Primary School was subsequently closed by the Victorian Minister of Education John Allman, who stated that the closure was ‘based on the particular situation at the school, not regarding Steiner education’.

Debate continues to persist concerning the content of Steiner philosophy, with opponents querying whether the system is a form of ‘religious’ education and whether it should be accepted or removed from a secular education context.

== See also ==
- Waldorf education
- Curriculum of the Waldorf schools
