= PS Herald =

Paddle steamer

Coordinates: 33°49.492′S 151°17.462′E

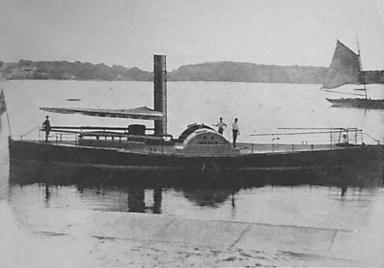
- Paddle steamer Herald, 1855–1884

History
- Name: Herald
- Owner: North Shore Steam Company (1855–1860); Struth and Evans (18XX–18XX); Hall & Son (18XX–1872); Blues Brothers (1872–1884)
- Port of registry: (United Kingdom) 85/1855 – Sydney (1855–1884); Official Number: 59510
- Fate: Wrecked

General characteristics
- Type: Steam paddle wheeler
- Tonnage: 41 GRT
- Displacement: 22 NRT
- Length: 74.7 ft (22.8 m)
- Beam: 12.8 ft (3.9 m)
- Draught: 5.7 ft (1.7 m)
- Installed power: Twin boilers
- Complement: 2

Herald was an iron-hulled paddle steamer imported as frames from the United Kingdom and assembled in 1855 by Richard Johnson in Sydney Harbour, New South Wales, Australia, where she was registered. The Herald is one of the earliest iron paddle wheel steamers built in Australia, where she operated within Sydney Harbour. She was initially used on the fledgling North Shore route between Dawes Point and Blues Point by the newly formed North Shore Steam Company; however, due to not enough traffic to make her financially viable, she often performed tug duties. Eventually the North Shore Steam Company was wound up; the vessel was put up for sale but continued picking up business wherever it was available, operating as a tug, ferry, excursion boat and cargo ship.

By 1873 Herald was working to Mosman Bay and Neutral Bay in a somewhat irregular weekday timetable. In the late 1870s and early 1880s she ran as an excursion boat to Manly and a tug. On 1 April 1884 the starboard boiler blew out while the Herald was waiting to bring in a sailing ship about 400 yards (370 m) from North Head, causing the vessel to sink.

== Ship description and construction ==
=== The iron paddle steamer Herald ===
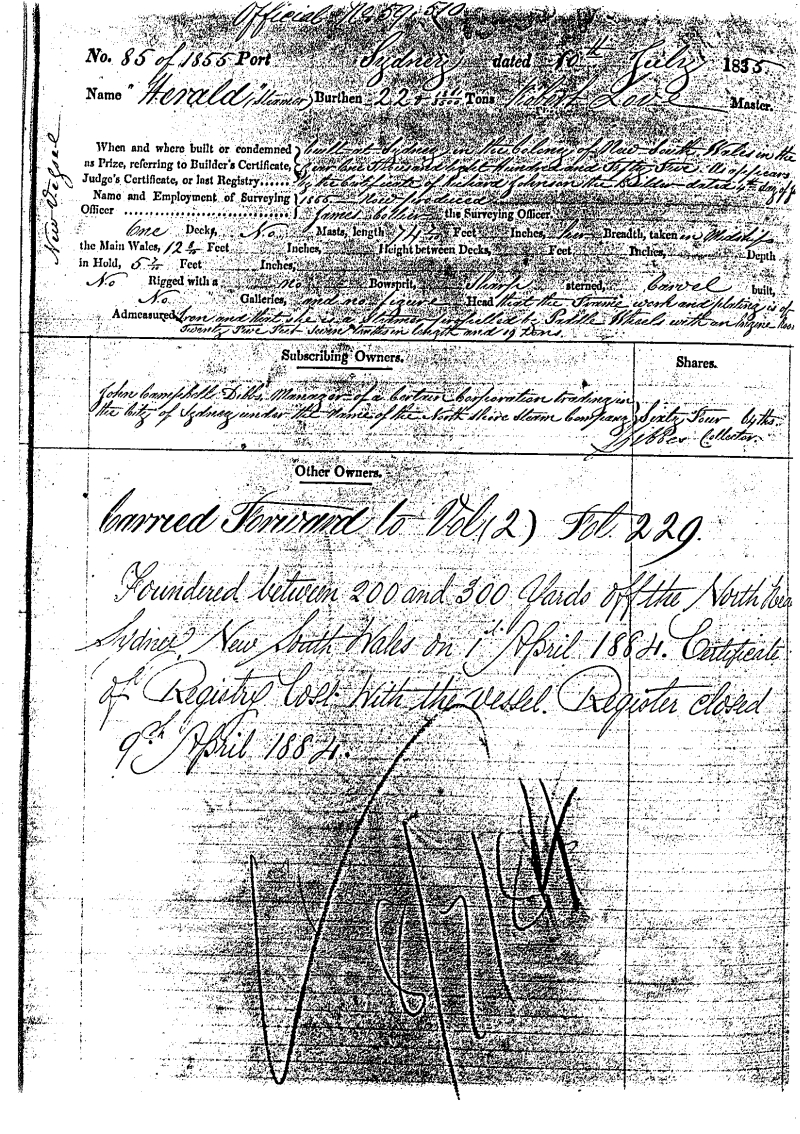
Paddle steamer Herald Sydney ship registration

The Iron Herald is reported as being built in London and sent to Sydney in sections, either being assembled in Australia from imported Frames or alternatively from three sections shipped out to Australia. The vessel was assembled at the Gasworks in Darling Harbour by Richard Johnstone, Davidson and Anderson

The vessel had a sharp bow and stern with a rudder able to be locked at each end so that it could be run in reverse.

It was a steam paddle wheel vessel with twin boilers and no decks, with passengers standing on top of the vessel.

It had a 41 GRT and a 22 NRT with a length of 74.7 feet (22.77 m) and a beam at midships of 12.8 feet (3.90 m) and a depth in the hold of 5.7 feet (1.74 m).

== Ship service history ==
=== Formation and operation of the North Shore Steam Company ===
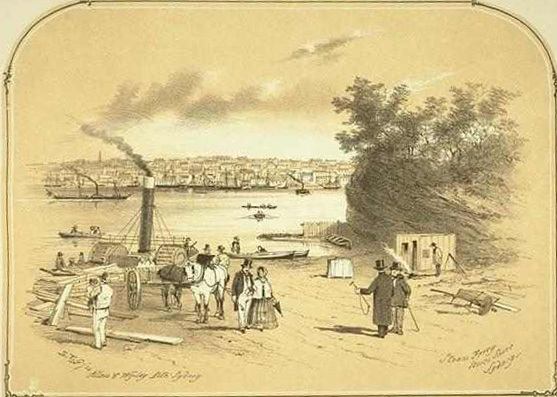
A ferry at North Sydney in 1856 that may be similar to the Herald

By 1846 there were 106 houses in North Sydney, with the post office opening in 1854, while having no firm transport across the harbour to Sydney central. A number of prominent locals formed the North Shore Steam Company to start a ferry company across the harbour. The company was incorporated through an Act of Parliament in November 1854.

The company purchased the Herald from the UK and imported it in pieces to be assembled by Richard Johnson at the July meeting of the North Shore Steam Company held at the Royal Hotel with T. J. Fisher in the chair. A. Berry (after whom Berrys Bay is named) and other shareholders were present. It was stated that four calls of one pound had been paid, leaving a fifth sum of one pound per share to be called up.

The steamer would be ready for running on Thursday [19 July 1855], and it was expected that the Brothers, steamer, and the Company’s new steamer, to be called the Herald, would make alternate trips, so as to give the residents and the public uninterrupted communication between the North Shore and Sydney.

Just a few weeks after the small vessel started plying the route on 31 July 1855 there was a fatal accident when Mr. Field, a butcher, residing on the North Shore, was crossing in the new steam ferryboat. The vessel left Windmill Street at about six o'clock with about six passengers and about 112 sheep on board. When approximately halfway across the harbour, one sheep went overboard. The engines were stopped when two men got outside the rail to lift the sheep in when the stanchions gave way. One man was pulled back in, but Field drowned.

Shortly after this incident an ad appeared in the local papers seeking a competent person to take charge of the steam ferry-boat Herald as well as an engineer, to whom liberal wages would be given. George Hall applied, and he spent the rest of his life working on the vessel, along with his sons. In May 1856 Hall, at that time the engineer of the Herald ferry boat running between Sydney and North Shore, was convicted of using obscene language towards John M. Ball, a passenger, and was ordered to pay a fine of 20s. and costs, or be imprisoned for seven days.

By July 1856 another steamer (Premier) had been added to the North Shore Steam Company, but by 1858 the company had started to run into issues, causing it to reduce fares.

All classes, the fares for foot passengers by the steamer Herald have been reduced to two-pence (2d), each way. This cheap conveyance will enable the workingman to visit the beautiful scenery of the North Shore at a moderate rate. The steamer plies from 8 o'clock a.m. to 7p.m. in the evening, to and from Windmill-street to Billy Blue's Point, every quarter of an hour.

By 1860 the North Shore Steam Company was wound up, with the Herald sold on 5 September 1859, for £700.

=== Subsequent operation ===
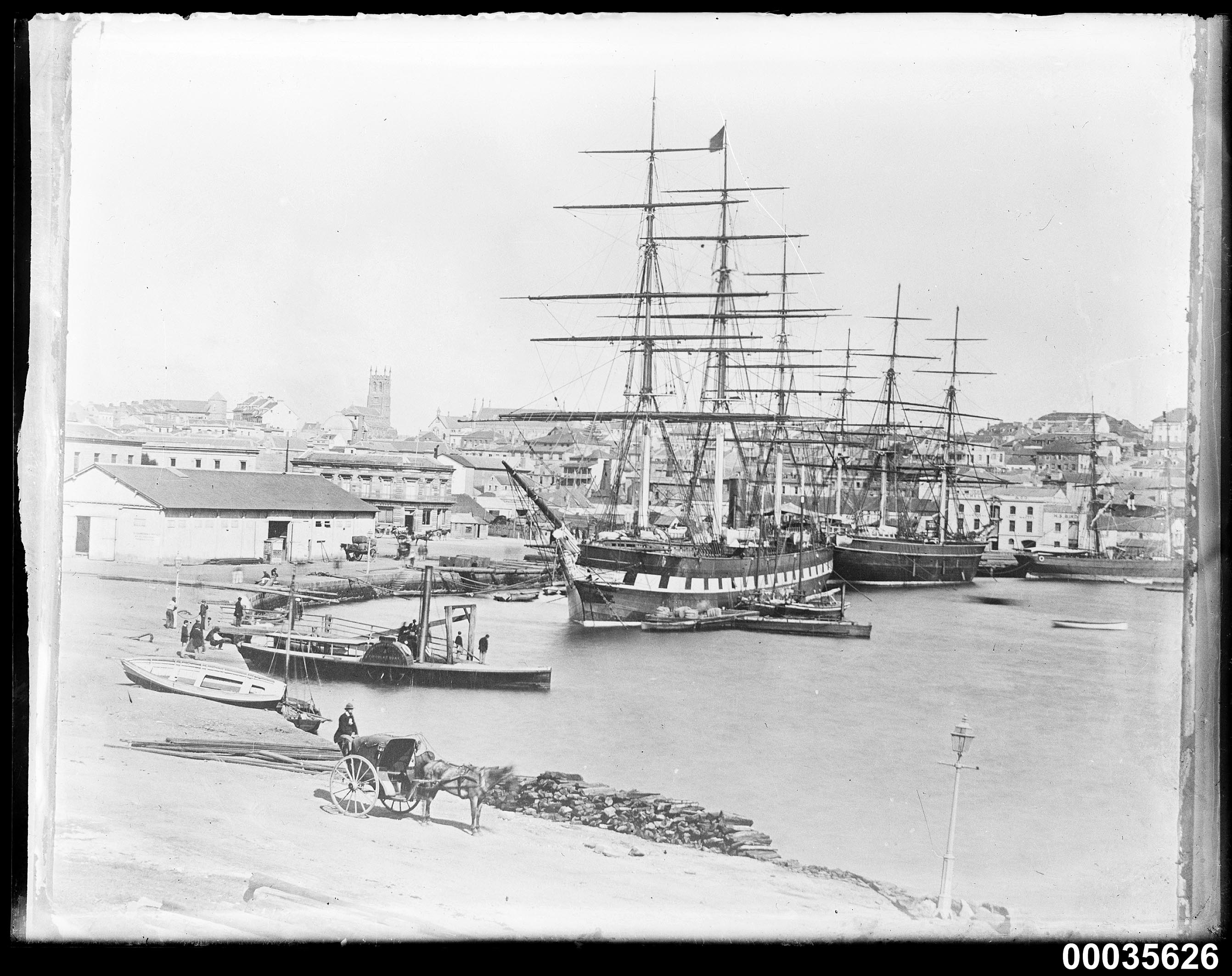
Herald in the foreground at Circular Quay

The vessel then passed into the hands of the Evans Brothers and continued on with George Hall on board. It was a ferry as well as a tug with no real notability until July 1863, when:

Edward Evans, George Hall, and George Hall the younger, were charged, on the information of William James Wilshire, Secretary of the N.S.W. Steam Navigation Board, with having on the 10th instant, kept a steam vessel called the Herald, plying for hire in the harbour of Port Jackson, the principal person then and there in charge being without a license, signed by the Clerk of Petty Sessions for the district in which the said vessel was plying for hire. Defendants pleaded guilty, and were fined £20, with 6s. 4d. costs, or in default of payment to be imprisoned during one month.

James Hall was charged with being the person having he principal charge of the above-named vessel on the date stated. Defendant pleaded guilty, and was fined£5, with 6s. costs of court, or in default to be imprisoned during seven days.

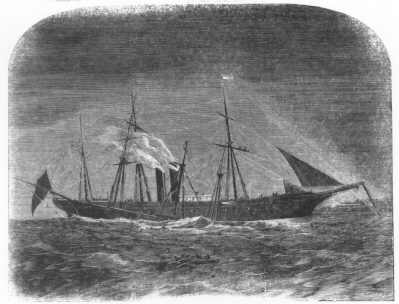
Collision of Ada and Jedda, where the Herald picked up survivors

In July 1865, when the Ada was involved in a collision with the mail steamer Jeddo and sank halfway between Fort Denison and Bradleys Head, the Herald and the Sydney pilot vessels picked up all of the survivors from the water.

In December 1868 the steam ferry and tugboat Herald was laid up for five weeks, undergoing a general overhaul in hull and machinery. A pair of new boilers, manufactured by Messrs. Mather of Bathurst-street, was supplied and installed into the vessel, replacing the now 13-year-old units originally supplied.

In March 1869 James Hall, master of the steamer Herald, appeared, on summons, charged with a breach of the Steam Navigation Act, by taking in tow the barque Mary Miller without exhibiting two masthead lights. A considerable amount of evidence was adduced for the prosecution, but none of the witnesses could swear positively that the tug had only one masthead light after she had made fast. The majority stated that when she came alongside they saw only one. Henry Hall, engineer of the Herald, deposed that on going alongside the barque the Herald had the usual steamers' lights up, but before getting underway the captain gave orders to hoist the additional masthead light. William Murdon, coxswain of the Herald, deposed that on making fast to the barque for the purpose of towing her he put up two masthead lights and the usual side lights. Charles Williams stated that he was on board the steamer Fire King on the occasion of a collision with the barque Mary Miller; he noticed a steamer alongside the barque, and the steamer had two mast headlights and a red light, and the barque had a green one. The case was dismissed.

The vessel continued on its service, also being used for day trips around the harbour and surrounds.

WATSON'S BAY-A large number of excursionists visited Watson's Bay yesterday, both by land and water. Those who proceeded by water were convoyed by the steamers Vesta and Herald, which plied from the Circular Quay and Woolloomooloo Bay, at convenient intervals from 10 a.m. to 3 p.m. A band of music was in attendance for the benefit of the dancing portion of the picnic party, whilst those who were averse to this kind of amusement fully enjoyed themselves by opening their well stocked hampers near the Gap and watching the vessels arriving and taking their departure from our harbour. EXCURSION TO MIDDLE HARBOUR – About 150 persons proceeded on an excursion on Saturday afternoon by the Steamer Herald to the head of Middle Harbour. The magnificent scenery which surround the placid waters of this beautiful lake-like locality is very little known by the general public, many of whom fancy that the Spit is the head of the navigation, whereas a steamer of a light draught, such as tho Herald, can proceed several miles beyond. The Herald left the Circular Quay at half-past 1 pm on Saturday, and, after calling at Woolloomooloo Bay, reached Bates at half-past 4. Mr. George Hall was on board, and to that gentleman some of the excursionists were indebted for his courtesy in pointing out objects of interest met with on the passage. After a delay of about a quarter of au hour, during which time several of the passengers went on ashore in search of flowers, the steamer's head was turned for Sydney, where the party was landed in good time and thoroughly well pleased with their trip.

In March 1873 the steamer Herald towed last the brig Firefly, of 160 tons register, to Newington Wharf eleven miles up the Parramatta River. This is the largest vessel that had ever been so far up the river, as the brig Firefly had been chartered to convey a cargo of bones from Newington to Melbourne.

When a small skiff capsized 100 and 150 yards from Mrs Macquarie's Chair, dumping three men in the water, the steamer Herald happened to be nearby. It had got round and thrown a line to the men in the water, which they failed to grasp; Mr Hall, of the steamer Herald swam to their assistance. Hall and a man he rescued were taken into a steam launch belonging to HMS Pearl, which had come to their rescue, and it was then that he saw another taken into that launch. The third, a William Taylor, age 20, drowned.

In July 1876 there was a collision between the steamers Phantom and Herald near the wharf in Woolloomooloo Bay by a want of lack of precaution on the part of the masters of both vessels, William Brett and George Hall, with the marine board cautioning both said masters to be more careful for the future.

In December 1877 it was reported that whilst the schooner African Maid was under tow down the harbour, by the steamer Herald, Mrs. Wigmore, the captain's wife, fell overboard, and her husband, who could not swim, then jumped after her. Captain Hall, of the steamer Herald, sprang after them and rescued both, thus making up a catalogue of 53 persons he had saved from death by drowning.

On 27 June 1879 the National Shipwreck Relief Society of NSW under Captain Hixson, R.N being chairman, resolved to give the society's silver medal to George Hall for deeds of bravery in saving human life from drowning. The medal was to be presented by his Excellency Lord Loftus during the Exhibition season. The silver medals are 1 3/4 inches in diameter. The obverse shows a female figure, representing the Society, comforting a sorrowing woman, and extending a wreath to a seaman, who endeavours to restore to animation a sailor boy washed ashore clinging to a fragment of mast. In the background are seen a stormy sea, a sinking ship, and a lifeboat laden with rescued people. The whole is encircled with the motto "Sunt lachrymx rerum sunt et sua præmia laudi." (from Virgil's Aeneid and mortal hearts are moved by mortal things) The reverse has the centre blank for an inscription, and the outer circle is formed by a life buoy on which appears the title of the Society.

== Loss ==
=== Wreck ===
On 1 April 1884, Captain George John Hall (a son of the former owner) went on board with the fireman (James Franks) at Central Wharf, and headed down harbour to tow in the schooner Malcolm, which was expected from Newcastle just before daybreak.

At about 4:30 am while Herald was lying hove to between 300 yards (274 m) and 400 yards (366 m) from North Head in the calm of the early morning, the starboard boiler suddenly burst (believed to be at the bottom of the boiler forcing the bottom of the vessel out) and filled the vessel with steam, canting the vessel over. At the time the boilers had been in the vessel 6 1/2 years and were carrying 40 pounds per square inch (276 kPa) of steam with 4 inches (102 mm) of pure water showing in the sight glasses. Water rushed in over the side as she listed and nothing could be done to save her, despite Captain Hall's courageous effort to steer her onto the reef at South Head. He and the fireman barely had time to abandon ship in a small boat before Herald sank.

A steamer passed by but failed to notice the incident, so the two men started to row back toward Sydney when the steamer Kiama noticed them and took them under tow.

=== Wreck site and wreckage ===
The vessel was found on 3 January 2013 by divers following up on an anomaly detected by a magnetometer.

The wreck site lies at a depth of 26 metres (85 ft) to 27 metres (89 ft) of water approximately 450 metres (492 yd) off North Head. The site is on sand away from any reef structure and completely intact but significantly buried under the sand to a level approximately the same as what would have been the deck level. It is a small site with just the two boilers (about 800 – 1000mm dia by 2.5m long), a broken engine and paddle wheel shaft (shifted by about 1 meter to the starboard) visible above the sand line. The sharp cutting shape of the bow and stern can just be made out with the twin (bow and stern) rudder posts just above the sand level.

== See also ==
- List of Sydney Harbour ferries
- Timeline of Sydney Harbour ferries
- Sophia Jane
- Surprise (paddle steamer)
- The Brothers (ferry)
