= Glenaeon Rudolf Steiner School =

Location
- Glenroy Ave; Middle Cove & Castlecrag, New South Wales; Australia; 33°47′28″S 151°12′28″E

Information
- Type: private, Steiner Waldorf, co-educational, day school
- Motto: Meaningful Lives
- Denomination: Non-denominational
- Established: 1957
- Principal: Diana Drummond
- Staff: 58
- Enrolment: 500 (K–12)
- Colours: Navy blue & white
- Slogan: Inspiring Meaningful Lives
- Website: www.glenaeon.nsw.edu.au

Glenaeon Rudolf Steiner School is a private, comprehensive, co-educational, non-denominational, Steiner early learning, primary and secondary day school co-located across multiple campuses in Middle Cove, Castlecrag and Willoughby on the Lower North Shore of Sydney, New South Wales, Australia. It was the first Steiner school established in Australia. The three campuses include the Preschool in Willoughby, a Junior School (K–3) at Castlecrag and Years 4–12 in Middle Cove. Playgroup sessions run weekly during term time at Willoughby and Castlecrag.

The school's curriculum and pedagogy follows the NSW Education Standards Authority requirements, combined with the educational insights of Austrian-born philosopher, scientist, artist and educator Rudolf Steiner (1861–1925). There are now more than 1000 Steiner schools in 61 different countries worldwide and over 40 Steiner schools in Australia.

Kamaroi Rudolf Steiner School (K–6), is located in Belrose and serves as a feeder school for both Glenaeon and Lorien Novalis School in Dural.

Glenaeon's motto is "Inspiring Meaningful Lives". It was previously "Unfolding Individual Journeys" and "Education for Life". Glenaeon is a member of Steiner Education Australia.

== History ==
The school was originally established in Pymble in 1957, by Sylvia Brose OAM, out of the community surrounding Walter and Marion Burley Griffin and their belief that the values of design, the arts, community, nature and spirit needed to underpin a rich academic education.

In 1970 the school was fully established in Middle Cove, located on four and a half acres of bushland. During the 1990s, Glenaeon expanded to the Castlecrag campus, where it now caters for Kindergarten and classes 1 and 2.

== Facilities ==
The School currently has two halls, the Sylvia Brose Hall at Middle Cove and the Marion Mahony Griffin Hall at Castlecrag. The Middle Cove campus also includes two playing fields, two multipurpose basketball courts, specialist Design & Technology and Art facilities, a biodynamic garden and music rooms. The high school building features several classrooms including a recently renovated library.

== Notable alumni ==
Entertainment, media and the arts

- John Polson, actor and film director, founder of Tropfest
- Toby Thatcher, oboist, Sydney Symphony Orchestra assistant conductor
- Richard Claremont, artist
- Hip Hop trio Bliss N Eso members, Jonathan "Bliss" Notley and Max "Eso" MacKinnon

Politics, public service and the law

- James Gardener, tech executive, former Department for Work and Pensions CTO

== See also ==
- List of non-government schools in New South Wales
