= Lórien =

Lórien or Lorien may refer to:

== J. R. R. Tolkien's legendarium ==
- Lothlórien, a forest realm in Middle-earth described in The Lord of the Rings
- Gardens of Lórien, the realm of the Vala Irmo in Valinor
- Lórien (Vala), the usual name for Irmo himself

== Other uses ==
- Lorien (Babylon 5), a character from the science-fiction TV series Babylon 5
- Lorien Novalis School a Waldorf school in Australia
- Lorien (Hambach Forest), a former treehouse colony of environmental activists in the Hambach Forest, Germany
- A fictional planet in the book series Lorien Legacies by Pittacus Lore
