= Dusseldorp =

Dusseldorp may refer to:

- Archaic Dutch name for Düsseldorf
- Dusseldorp, Netherlands, a village in Castricum, Netherlands

== People with the surname ==
- Dick Dusseldorp (1918–2000), Dutch engineer and Australian building contractor (Civil and Civic)
- Marta Dusseldorp (born 1973), Australian actress
- Stef Dusseldorp (born 1989), Dutch racing driver
