= Australia Square =

Australia Square Tower
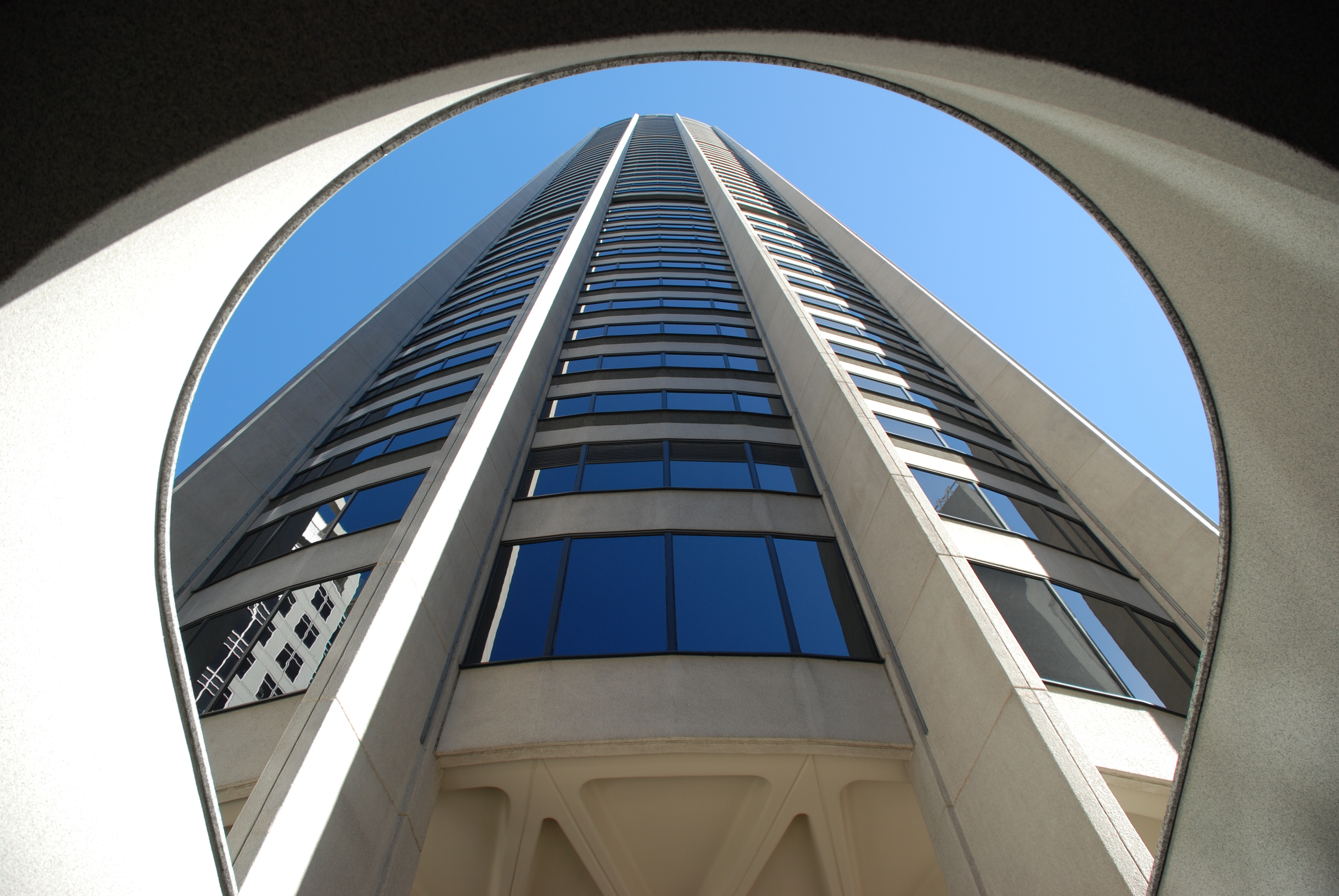
- Circular form of the Tower Building

General information
- Status: Open
- Type: Office, retail
- Location: Sydney
- Coordinates: 33°51′54″S 151°12′28″E
- Construction started: Plaza Building: 1962; Tower Building: 1964
- Opening: Plaza Building: 1964; Tower & Plaza: 1967
- Owner: GPT & Dexus

Height
- Roof: 170 metres (560 ft)

Technical details
- Floor count: 50
- Floor area: 65,000 m^{2} (700,000 sq ft)
- Lifts/elevators: 17

Design and construction
- Architect: Harry Seidler
- Structural engineer: Pier Luigi Nervi
- Main contractor: Civil & Civic

Website
- Australia Square

Australia Square Tower is an office and retail skyscraper in the Sydney central business district, Australia. Its main address is 264 George Street, and the square is bounded on the northern side by Bond Street, eastern side by Pitt Street and southern side by Curtin Place.

== Description and history ==
The building was first conceived in 1961, and its final design by Harry Seidler & Associates was in 1964 after collaboration with structural engineer Pier Luigi Nervi. Today, it remains a landmark building in Sydney and is regarded as iconic to Australian architecture. It has even been described as the most beautiful building in Australia, though it is not without criticism. The outstanding feature of the square is the Tower Building; from its completion in 1967 until 1976 it was the tallest building in Sydney.

Originally owned by Lendlease, in 1981 it was sold to GPT. It is jointly owned by GPT and Dexus. During the mid-1990s the building was completely refurbished. Another $11 million refurbishment program, which included replacing all paving in public areas with Italian porphyry paving stone, new lighting and outdoor tables was conducted in 2003.

== The Tower ==
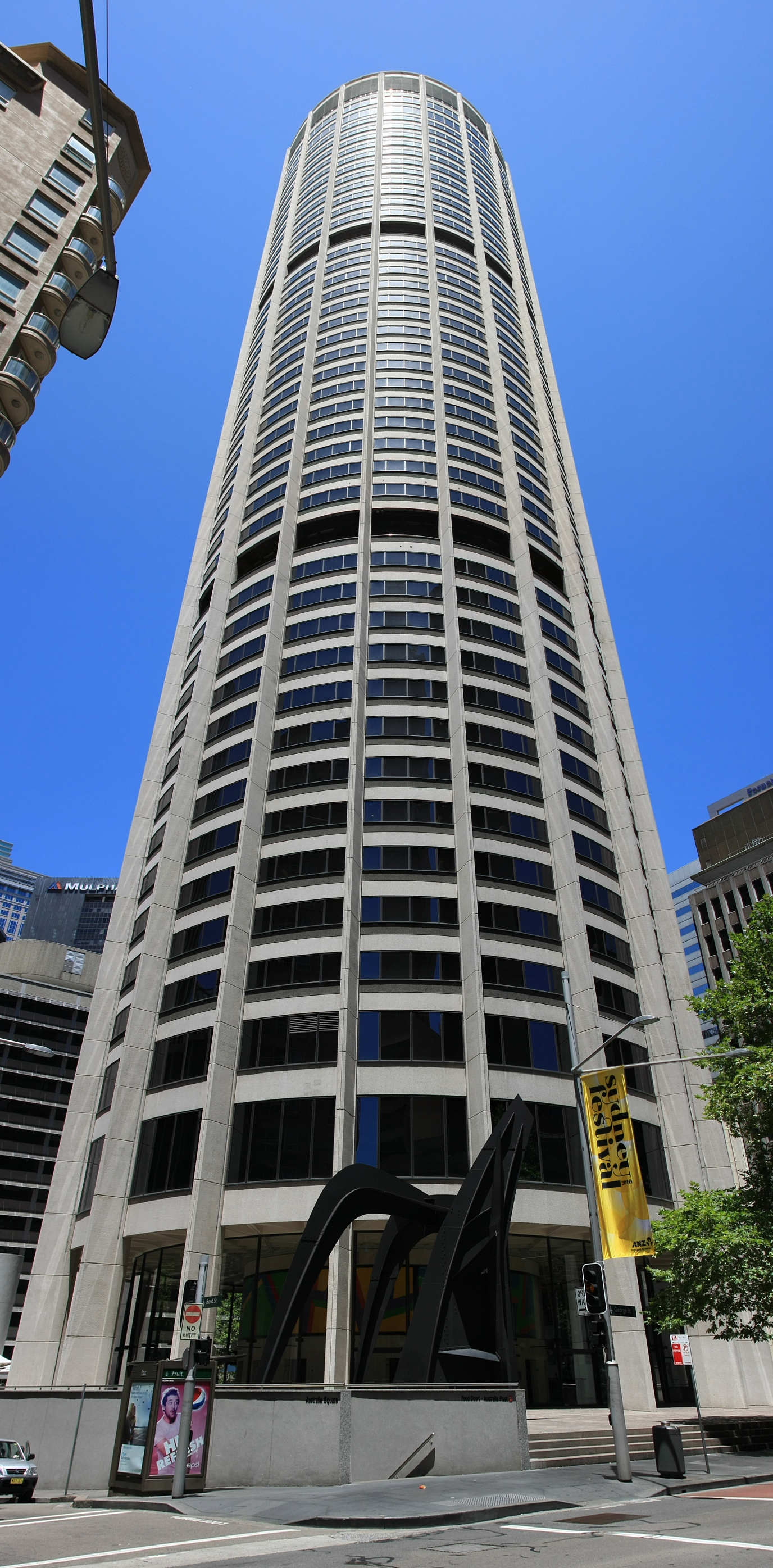
Tower with Calder sculpture

=== Design ===
Australia Square was constructed shortly after height restrictions were lifted in the city of Sydney and at a time when small sites, including blocks created by laneways, were being consolidated into larger blocks to accommodate high-rise office towers.

It was the world's tallest lightweight concrete building at the time it was built. The Tower Building is approximately 170 metres (560 ft) tall and occupies only one quarter of the block. The circular plan of the main tower allowed Seidler to minimise what he called "the dark canyon effect", an approach further helped by setting the tower back from the street.

The original proposal included 58 floors; however, this was reduced to 50. On the 47th floor is a revolving restaurant called The Summit and the 48th floor houses an observation deck. The building contains one of Sydney's largest basement car parks with spaces for 400 vehicles. The major tenants of the Tower include Origin Energy and HWL Ebsworth. The major tenant was Lendlease until March 2004.

With a height of 170 metres (560 ft), Australia Square also holds the distinction of being Australia's first modern skyscraper (a building which exceeds the height of 150 metres (490 ft)) as designated by the Council on Tall Buildings and Urban Habitat.

=== Construction ===
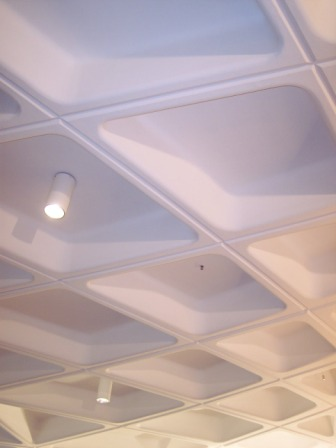
Original ceiling, level 11

The project was instigated by Dick Dusseldorp, the founder of Lendlease.

The city block which is now Australia Square is approximately 5,500 square metres (59,000 sq ft) in area, and formerly held some 30 properties and buildings. Australia Square was constructed by Civil & Civic. Construction, starting with demolition of the old buildings, began in 1961. The finished tower is 50 storeys tall with most of these available for commercial tenants, a total of 40,900 square metres (440,000 sq ft).

The tower is constructed of lightweight concrete, with 20 projecting vertical columns tapering to the summit and supporting a combination of interlocking rib-structured reinforcement and radial support beams. The tower is 42 metres (138 ft) in diameter, with a central core of 20 metres (66 ft) diameter. The core contains elevator shafts, emergency stairwells and service conduits. Each floor is donut shaped, with a clear span of 11 metres (36 ft) to the perimeter windows and a total area of 1,032 square metres (11,110 sq ft) each. Construction time for each floor was five working days—a new standard in office tower construction.

== Other features ==
=== Plaza Building ===
Facing Pitt Street is the 13-storey Plaza Building, a comparatively simple rectangular office building (designed 1961, construction started 1962, completed 1964). The Plaza Building was devised to be completed and generate rental income while the round tower was being constructed.

=== Public art ===
Alongside the Tower Building sits a large abstract steel sculpture by Alexander Calder. There is also a sculpture by Seward Johnson Jr, Waiting. The tower ground floor lobby had tapestries by Le Corbusier and Victor Vasarely on display; however, due to fading, those pieces were removed and replaced in 2003 with a mural by Sol LeWitt. The former Lendlease executive floor in the tower also had many artworks specified by Harry Seidler: the reception area displayed a sculpture by Norman Carlberg and tapestries by John Olsen and Le Corbusier, the executive floor suites also had a tapestry by Miro and artwork by Alexander Calder.

=== Public spaces ===
Extensive public open space, including fountains, is a feature of the Square. This design feature is an early example of including a public open space on private land. There are numerous entrances to the retail precincts in the lower ground level of the Tower, which include a post office and food outlets. The retail target is the office worker on a lunch break, and the open-plan design and ease of access have been styled accordingly.

== Surpassing of height ==
The Australia Square Tower building was the tallest building in Sydney for nine years. In 1976, the south building of the AMP Centre was opened at 188 metres (617 ft), although having only 45 storeys and no public observation deck.

== Architecture awards ==
In 1967 the NSW Chapter of the Royal Australian Institute of Architects awarded Australia Square the Sir John Sulman Medal and the Civic Design Award for its innovative and appealing architecture and urban design. In 2012 Australia Square's design excellence was awarded New South Wales Enduring Architecture Award followed later that year with the 2012 National Award for Enduring Architecture presented by the Australian Institute of Architects at the national architecture awards, 45 years after original completion.
