= Billy Blue =

Australian convict

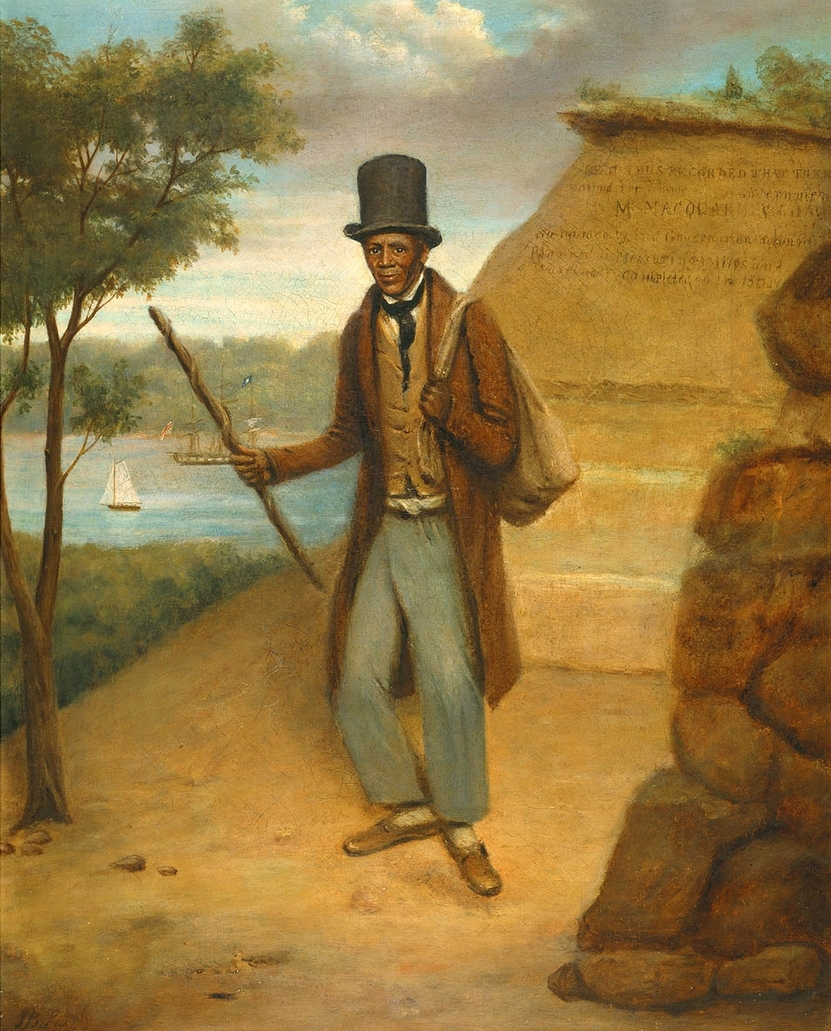
- 1834 portrait of William Blue, by J. B. East
- Born: William Blue c. 1740/67; Jamaica, New York or Colony of Jamaica
- Died: 7 May 1834; Sydney, Australia
- Occupations: Sailor, boatman
- Spouse: Elizabeth Williams (1805–1824, her death)
- Children: 6

William Blue (c. 1767 – 7 May 1834) was an Australian convict who, after completing his sentence, became a boatman providing one of the first services to take people across Sydney Harbour. He was also made a water bailiff and watched boat traffic on Port Jackson from a special tower.

Although Billy Blue's place and date of birth are uncertain, convict records suggest he was born in New York, around 1740 or 1767. Other people reading his records believe him to have been from Jamaica, West Indies.

In 1817, Governor Macquarie granted Billy Blue 80 acres (320,000 m^{2}) at what is now Blues Point, which was named after him.

== Early life ==
Physically imposing, he was described as a "strapping Jamaican Negro 'a very Hercules in proportion' with a bright eye and a jocular wit". Blue said he had served in the British Army in America and Europe before arriving in Australia, and that he had served during the American Revolutionary War.

On 4 October 1796, Blue was convicted, at Maidstone, in Kent, of stealing raw sugar and sentenced to seven years' transportation. After serving over four years in a prison hulk he was transported to Botany Bay, Australia, in the convict ship Minorca.

Blue arrived in Sydney in 1801 and served out the remaining two years of his sentence. In 1804, records show him living in The Rocks, then a slum. There he met Elizabeth Williams, a 30-year-old convict from Hampshire, England, who had arrived in June 1804. On 27 April 1805, they were married at the old St. Philip's Anglican church in Sydney, where five of their six children were later christened.

== Career ==
Blue later became a boatman, ferrying passengers across Sydney Harbour.

In 1807, Blue was the only person licensed to ply a ferry across the harbour. He was also made a water bailiff and watched boat traffic on Port Jackson from a special tower. Governor Macquarie named him "The Old Commodore" and he ran his ferry dressed in a blue naval officers coat and top hat. His ferry service grew to a fleet of 11 vessels, and in 1817, Governor Macquarie granted Billy Blue 80 acres (320,000 m^{2}) at what is now Blues Point.

It was said that Blue's law infringements were frequent, but due to his colourful personality, they were looked upon with a "benevolent air" by the authorities.

He died in 1834 at his North Sydney home.

== Legacy ==
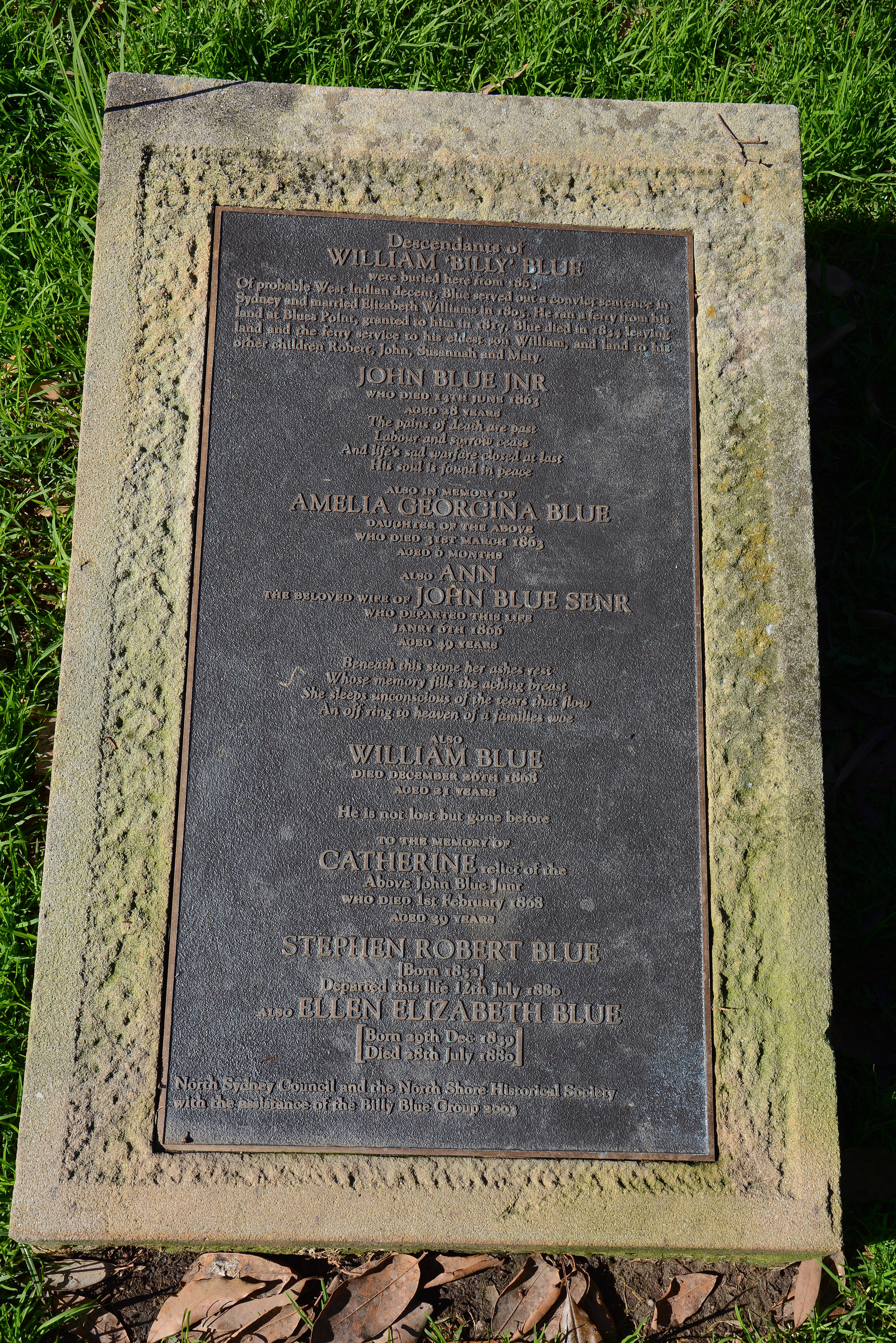
Plaque for Billy Blue and family, St Thomas Rest Park, Crows Nest, Sydney

Billy Blue's name has been preserved in place names such as Blues Point on Sydney Harbour, Blue Street and Blues Point Road in North Sydney, as well as commercial names like the Billy Blue College of Design and Blues Point Tower. His nickname 'The Old Commodore' is used in the name of the Commodore Hotel in Blues Point Road.

== See also ==
- African Australians
