= Caltex House =

Caltex House may refer to the following buildings that were named Caltex House when built:

- Chevron House, in Singapore
- Stamford on Kent, in Sydney, Australia
