= Middle Cove =

Middle Cove may refer to:

- Middle Cove, New South Wales, Australia
- Middle Cove, Newfoundland and Labrador, Canada
