= Richard Claremont =

Australian painter

- Born: 3 May 1965
- Education: Glenaeon Rudolf Steiner School (1982), Sydney College of the Arts (1985)
- Known for: Being «the painting postie»
- Notable work: Dusk, Port Kembla (2013)
- Style: Impressionism
- Awards: ANL Maritime Art Prize; 2015 Dusk, Port Kembla
- Website: www.richardclaremont.com

Richard Claremont (born 3 May 1965) is a Wollongong-based Australian painter. His style is expressionistic and related to impressionism. Claremont worked for the Australia Post from 1988 to 2017 and made sketches while delivering mail. He became known as 'the painting postie' in media.

== Early life and education ==
Claremont was born on 3 May 1965 in Sydney. He attended Glenaeon Rudolf Steiner School. While at school he worked at Sydney's Artflow Graphics studio but decided to study Visual Arts instead of Graphic Design and entered Sydney College of the Arts where he studied from 1983 to 1985. Claremont displayed his works in a group exhibition of 4 painters from the College in 1985, earning a positive review from The Sydney Morning Herald's art critic John McDonald.

Between 1985 and 1987 he travelled throughout Europe, the Middle East and North America, staying in Canada for two years.

== Art career ==
In 1988, Claremont returned to Australia and started working for Australia Post as a postman serving City of Shellharbour area. What started as a summer job, became his main occupation for almost thirty years. Claremont found inspiration on the city streets, making sketches while delivering mail. In 2015 he won ANL Maritime Art Prize awarded by The Mission to Seafarers. Claremont's works are on permanent display at Bluescope Visitors Centre at Port Kembla. He was also one of Australia's contemporary artists featured at Donald Keys' Art Heads series of portraits.

== Awards ==
Year	Award	Result
2015	ANL Maritime Art Prize	Won
2013	Mosman Art Prize	finalist
2015	NSW Parliament Plein Air Painting Prize	finalist
2016	NSW Parliament Plein Air Painting Prize	finalist
2017	NSW Parliament Plein Air Painting Prize	finalist

== Exhibitions ==
Year	Exhibition	Gallery	City	Country
1985	Four Artists from Sydney College of the Arts	Australian Visual Arts Gallery	Darlinghurst	Australia
1993	Balloon Over Kenya	James Harvey Gallery	Balmain	Australia
1995	Steeltown	First Draft	Sydney	Australia
1998	Broken Hill And Beyond	Project Contemporary Artspace	Wollongong	Australia
2013	Gion	Salerno Gallery	Sydney	Australia
2014	Autumn Exhibition (group show)	Bradman Centre Art Gallery	Bowral	Australia
2015	Remembered Landscapes	Depot Gallery	Sydney	Australia
2015	Group show	Galerie Mona Lisa	Paris	France
2015	Close to Home	Clifton School of Arts	Clifton	Australia
2016	Asia Contemporary Art Show	Conrad Hong Kong	Hong Kong	China
2017	Secret Sydney	Aro Gallery	Sydney	Australia
2018	Bright New Day	Brightspace Gallery	Melbourne	Australia
2019	Terra Flora	Brightspace Gallery	Melbourne	Australia
