= Blues Point =

Coordinates: 33°50′59″S 151°12′13″E

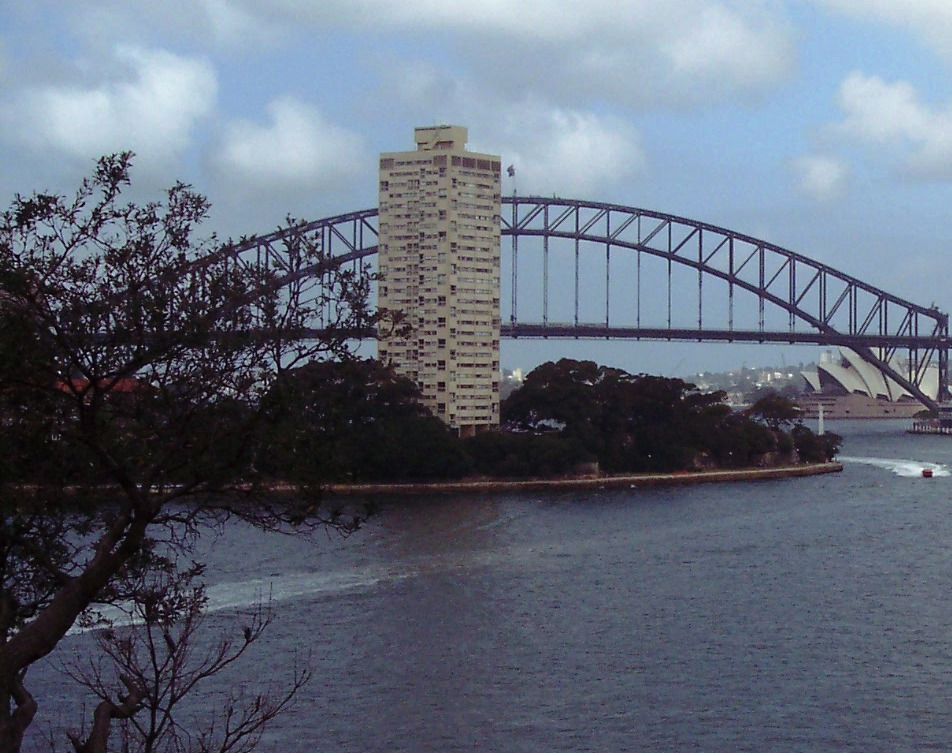
Blues Point as seen from the west, with Blues Point Tower and Sydney Harbour Bridge behind

Blues Point is a harbourside locality of North Sydney, Australia. Named after local mariner Billy Blue in the 19th century, Blues Point is at the very southern tip of the McMahons Point peninsula and has views of Sydney Harbour. The locality, within North Sydney Council, is home to the Blues Point Tower, a controversial residential tower designed by Harry Seidler. Since 2005, under the dual naming policy Blues Point has also been referred to by its indigenous name, Warungareeyuh. Blues Point is also used as a vantage point for Sydney New Year's Eve celebration.

== History ==
Blues Point was named after Billy Blue, a convict who arrived in Sydney on the Minorca on 14 December 1801, transported for stealing a bag of sugar. Physically imposing, he was described as a "strapping Jamaican Negro 'a very Hercules in proportion' with a bright eye and a jocular wit". He claimed to have served with the British Army in the American War of Independence. When he arrived in 1801 he only had two years of his sentence left and he was soon working on the harbour with boats and selling oysters. His friendly manner and humorous conversation made him popular and he became a notable local character. He married English-born convict Elizabeth Williams in 1805, and in 1807, was the only person licensed to ply a ferry across the harbour. Governor Macquarie named him "The Old Commodore" and he ran his ferry dressed in a blue naval officers coat and top hat. His ferry service grew to a fleet of 11 vessels, and in 1817, Governor Macquarie granted Billy Blue 80 acres (320,000 m^{2}) at what is now Blues Point. He died in 1834 at his North Sydney home.
