= Civil & Civic =

Australian construction company

- Company type: Subsidiary
- Industry: Construction
- Founded: 1951
- Founder: Dick Dusseldorp
- Defunct: 1999
- Successor: Bovis Lend Lease
- Headquarters: Sydney, Australia
- Area served: Australia; New Zealand
- Parent: Lendlease
- Website: Lend Lease Projects

Civil & Civic was an Australian construction company. Founded in 1951, it was acquired in 1961 by Lend Lease Corporation.

== History ==
Civil & Civic was founded by Dick Dusseldorp in 1951 on behalf of Dutch building companies Bredero's Bouwbedrijf and The Royal Dutch Harbour Company as an Australian building contractor. Its first contract was to supply and erect 200 prefabricated houses for the Snowy Mountains Authority which had been established by William Hudson, engineer of the Snowy Mountains Scheme.

Hudson's greatest obstacle in the completion of the scheme was the provision of labour and materials. Without a resolution to these two problems the realisation of the project was doubtful. But 31-year-old Dutch immigrant Dick Dusseldorp conceived a plan to prefabricate frames for worker housing in Finland, plumbing in England, ship materials via Cooma and recruit labour from the Netherlands to erect the homes. Dusseldorp established Civil & Civic to take on and manage the multimillion-dollar contract.

Civil & Civic went on to become Australia's leading provider of project management services in the construction industry, delivering a number of landmark projects including Stage I of the Sydney Opera House, Australia's first all concrete skyscraper (Caltex House), and the world's first high-rise strata title apartment building (Blues Point Tower).

In 1961 Civil & Civic was acquired by Lend Lease Corporation, but the company continued to trade under the Civil & Civic name, also constructing the world's tallest lightweight concrete construction building (Australia Square), and the tallest building in the world outside North America (MLC Centre) at the time of completion.

In July 1999 Civil & Civic was rebranded Lend Lease Projects. After Lend Lease Corporation acquired Bovis from P&O in October 1999, the former Civil & Civic business merged with the former Bovis business to form Bovis Lend Lease.

== Major Projects ==
Major projects undertaken included:
- Caltex House completed in 1957
- The Shine Dome completed in 1958
- Sydney Opera House Podium completed in 1962
- Blues Point Tower completed in 1962
- Reserve Bank of Australia Building, Sydney completed in 1964
- Reserve Bank of Australia Building, Canberra completed in 1965
- Australia Square completed in 1967
- MLC Centre completed in 1977
- Jolimont Centre completed in 1983
- The Connaught completed in 1984
- Parramatta Stadium completed in 1986
- National Tennis Centre at Flinders Park completed in 1988
- Sydney Football Stadium completed in 1988
- Sydney Olympic Village completed in 1999
