= Water bailiff =

Law-enforcement officer responsible for the policing of bodies of water

A water bailiff is a law-enforcement officer responsible for the policing of bodies of water, such as rivers, lakes or the coast. The position has existed in many jurisdictions throughout history.

== Scotland ==
In Scotland, under the Salmon and Freshwater Fisheries (Consolidation) (Scotland) Act 2003, water bailiffs are appointed by District Salmon Fishery Boards or the Scottish Government is responsible for enforcing laws relating to salmon and trout. Although Police officers have not certainly required powers of entry, search, seizure and arrest under the Act, it remains an offence to obstruct them.

Water bailiffs may enter and remain upon land in the vicinity of any river or of the sea coast at any time for the purpose of preventing a breach of the provisions of the Act, or detecting persons guilty of any breach of those provisions. If they wish to enter the vicinity of the sea or coast, they must obtain a warrant from a sheriff or justice of the peace.

Water bailiffs may also:

- examine any dam, fixed engine or obstruction, or any mill lade, and for that purpose enter on any land;
- stop and search any boat which is used in fishing or any boat which there is reasonable cause to suspect of containing salmon or trout;
- search and examine fishing nets or other instruments used in fishing or any basket, pocket or other receptacle capable of carrying fish, which there is reasonable cause to suspect of containing salmon or trout illegally taken;
- seize any fish, instrument or article, boat or vehicle liable to be forfeited in pursuance of this Act.

They may search stationary vehicles if they believe that an offence against any of the provisions of the Act has been committed and that evidence of the commission of the offence is to be found in a vehicle on private land adjoining any water or in a stationary vehicle on a public road adjoining such water or land.

They may "seize and detain" any person found committing an offence against the Act and deliver such person to a constable.

Water bailiffs cannot enforce protection orders made under Section 48 of the Act.

== England and Wales ==
Fisheries Enforcement Officer Water bailiff

Agency overview
- Legal personality: Non-departmental public body

Jurisdictional structure
- Operations jurisdiction: United Kingdom
- Legal jurisdiction: England; Wales
- Governing body: Department for Environment, Food and Rural Affairs (England)

Operational structure
- Constables: Salmon and Freshwater Fisheries Act 1975

In England and Wales, water bailiffs are appointed by the 'appropriate agency'. In England, the appropriate agency is the Environment Agency (referred to as 'the Agency'), and in Wales, the appropriate agency is Natural Resources Wales. They derive their powers from the Salmon and Freshwater Fisheries Act 1975. These water bailiffs have the powers of a constable, under the act.

Any water bailiff:

- may examine any dam, fishing weir, fishing mill dam, fixed engine or obstruction, or any artificial watercourse, and for that purpose enter on any land,
- may examine any instrument or bait which he has reasonable cause to suspect of having been or being used or likely to be used in taking fish in contravention of the Salmon and Freshwater Fisheries Act or any container which he has reasonable cause to suspect of having been or being used or likely to be used for holding any such instrument, bait or fish,
- may stop and search any boat or other vessel used in fishing in the appropriate agency's area or any vessel or vehicle which he has reasonable cause to suspect of containing:
  - fish which had been caught in contravention of the Salmon and Freshwater Fisheries Act,
  - any such instrument, bait or container as aforesaid,
- may seize any fish and any instrument, vessel, vehicle or other thing liable to be forfeited in pursuance of the Salmon and Freshwater Fisheries Act.

If any person:

- refuses to allow a water bailiff or a person appointed by the Secretary of State for Environment, Food and Rural Affairs to
  - make any entry, search or examination which he is by this section authorised to make, or to
  - seize anything which he is so authorised to seize, or
- resists or obstructs a water bailiff or person so appointed in any such entry, search, examination or seizure,

they commit an offence.

=== Power to enter lands ===
Any water bailiff or other officer of the appropriate agency, under a special order (which lasts for a maximum of 12 months) in writing from that agency, and any person appointed by the Secretary of State, under an order in writing from him (which also lasts for a maximum of 12 months), may at all reasonable times, for the purpose of preventing any offence against the Salmon and Freshwater Fisheries Act 1975, enter, remain upon and traverse any lands adjoining or near to any waters. This does not include a dwelling-house or the curtilage of a dwelling-house, or decoys or lands used exclusively for the preservation of wild fowl.

=== Seizure ===
An officer of the appropriate agency, an officer of a market authority (any corporation, local authority, body of trustees or other persons having power to maintain or regulate any market) acting within the area of the jurisdiction of that authority, an officer appointed by the Secretary of State, an officer appointed in writing by the Worshipful Company of Fishmongers, or a police officer may seize any salmon, trout or freshwater fish bought, sold or exposed for sale by, or in the possession for sale of, any person in contravention of the Salmon and Freshwater Fisheries Act.

=== Orders and warrants to enter suspected premises ===
Where from a statement on oath of a water bailiff or any other officer of the appropriate agency, or any person appointed by the Secretary of State, it appears to any justice of the peace that the person making the statement has good reason to suspect that any offence against the Salmon and Freshwater Fisheries Act is being or is likely to be committed on any land situated on or near to any waters, the justice may by order under his hand authorise him, during a period not exceeding 24 hours to be specified in the order, to enter upon and remain on the land during any hours of the day or night for the purpose of detecting the persons committing the offence.

Any justice of the peace upon an information on oath that there is probable cause to suspect any offence against the Salmon and Freshwater Fisheries Act to have been committed on any premises, or any salmon, trout, freshwater fish or eels to have been illegally taken, or any illegal nets or other instruments to be on any premises, by warrant under his hand and seal may authorise any water bailiff or other officer of the appropriate agency, or any person appointed by the Secretary of State, or any constable, to:

- enter the premises for the purposes of detecting the offence or the fish, nets or other instruments, at such times of the day or night as are mentioned in the warrant, and
- to seize all illegal nets and other instruments and all salmon, trout, freshwater fish or eels suspected to have been illegally taken that may be found on the premises.

This type of warrant is only valid for one week.

=== Power to apprehend persons fishing illegally ===
If any person,

- takes or kills any fish where the taking or killing constitutes an offence under the Salmon and Freshwater Fisheries Act,
- is found on or near any waters with intent to take or kill any fish where the taking or killing would constitute an offence under that Act,
- has an instrument prohibited by that Act in his possession for the capture of any fish, where the capture would constitute an offence under that Act;

then a water bailiff or a person appointed by the Secretary of State, with any assistants, may "seize" him (in modern-day parlance, "arrest") without warrant and put him as soon as may be into the custody of a police officer.

=== Power to require production of fishing licences ===
A water bailiff or other officer of the appropriate agency, or any constable, may require any person who is fishing, or whom he reasonably suspects of being about to fish or to have within the preceding half-hour fished in any area, to produce his licence or other authority to fish and to state his name and address.

A water bailiff or other officer of the appropriate agency who on any occasion finds a person who he has reason to believe is committing, or has on that occasion committed, a fixed penalty offence (see below), may require that person to state his name and address.

A person holding a fishing licence for any area may, on production of his licence, require any person who is fishing in that area to produce his licence or other authority to fish and to state his name and address. If any person required to produce his fishing licence or other authority or to state his name and address fails to do so, he shall be guilty of an offence; but if within seven days after the production of his licence was so required he produces the licence or other authority at the appropriate office of the appropriate agency he shall not be convicted of an offence under this section for failing to produce it. This law has since been changed.

"The appropriate office of the appropriate agency" means:

- in a case where the person requiring the production of the licence or other authority specifies a particular office of the appropriate agency for its production, that office; and
- in any other case, any office of the appropriate agency;

and for the purposes of that subsection where a licence or other authority which any person has been required to produce is sent by post to an office of the appropriate agency that licence or other authority shall be treated as produced by that person at that office.

=== Fixed penalty notices ===
Where on any occasion a water bailiff or other officer of the appropriate agency finds a person who he has reason to believe is committing, or has on that occasion committed, a fixed penalty offence, he may give to that person a fixed penalty notice. The offences for which a FPN can be issued are those prescribed for the purpose:

- under the Salmon and Freshwater Fisheries Act 1975,
- under the Salmon Act 1986,
- under or by virtue of regulations or orders made under section 115, 116 or 142 of the Water Resources Act 1991, or
- under section 211(3) of the Water Resources Act 1991, so far as relating to byelaws made by virtue of paragraph 6 of Schedule 25 to that Act.

The means by which a FPN shall be paid, and associated provisions, are contained in section 37A of the Salmon and Freshwater Fisheries Act.

=== General ===
A water bailiff and a person appointed by the Secretary of State shall be deemed to be a constable for the purpose of the enforcement of the Salmon and Freshwater Fisheries Act 1975, or any order or byelaw under it, and to have all the same powers and privileges, and be subject to the same liabilities as a constable duly appointed has, or is subject to by virtue of the common law, or of any statute.

=== Uniform and equipment ===
The production by a water bailiff, or a person appointed by the Secretary of State, of evidence of his appointment (e.g. a warrant card/ID card) shall be a sufficient warrant for him exercising the powers conferred on him by the Salmon and Freshwater Fisheries Act 1975.

Water bailiffs (sometimes called "fisheries officers" or "fisheries enforcement officers") are generally uniformed.

This uniform consists of:

- green cargo trousers
- green t-shirt/wicking shirt
- green jacket
- outdoor boots
- green baseball cap.

The uniform is identified by "Environment Agency" (in England) and "Fisheries Officer" patches.

Some water bailiffs have been issued with stab vests, expandable batons and handcuffs as a workplace safety measure. Some wear airwave radios, which can communicate with other emergency services. Most uniforms also include an identification number (usually a combination of letters and numbers), similar to a police collar number. They may carry other useful equipment, such as radios, torches and pens.

=== Police constables ===
A police constable whose services are provided to the appropriate agency under section 25 of the Police Act 1996 shall have all the powers and privileges of a water bailiff.

=== Volunteer water bailiffs ===
Volunteer water bailiffs (VWB) have been used increasingly by the Environment Agency. They generally do not have powers of a constable, or the same duties as a fisheries officer/water bailiff, at least initially.

However, there are opportunities for the VWBs to become warranted.

The GOV.UK blog website said:

Volunteers that have demonstrated a strong commitment to the scheme and have the necessary skills, can apply to progress to the second phase. If successful – and following more specialised training in conflict resolution and using legal powers – they will be issued with a warrant and the equipment to check rod licences.

Phase 1 volunteers are unwarranted, 'eyes and ears' bailiffs. Phase 2 volunteers are warranted bailiffs, with powers.

== Isle of Man ==
The water bailiff was a historical officer in the Isle of Man responsible for enforcing fishing law.

== See also ==
- Bailiff
