= James Alexander Gardner =

James Gardner (born 1970) is Chief Technology Officer at the UK's Department for Work and Pensions, and was previously an employee at Lloyds Banking Group where he was Head of Innovation. In 2011 he joined innovation management company Spigit, where he is now Chief Technology Officer.

== Career ==
During his time at Lloyds, Gardner wrote a candid blog about the banking industry, focusing on innovation and technology in the industry. He continued to write in a similar vein from within the public sector. In March 2010, he was cited as the most social media connected financial services executive in the United Kingdom, some 9 months after he had left the banking industry.

In 2008 Gardner signed a deal with John Wiley and Sons to write a book on banking innovation which included case studies from his former employer and other global banks. It includes detailed material on the bank's innovation prediction market, which attracted interest from the trade press.
