= Blues Point Tower =

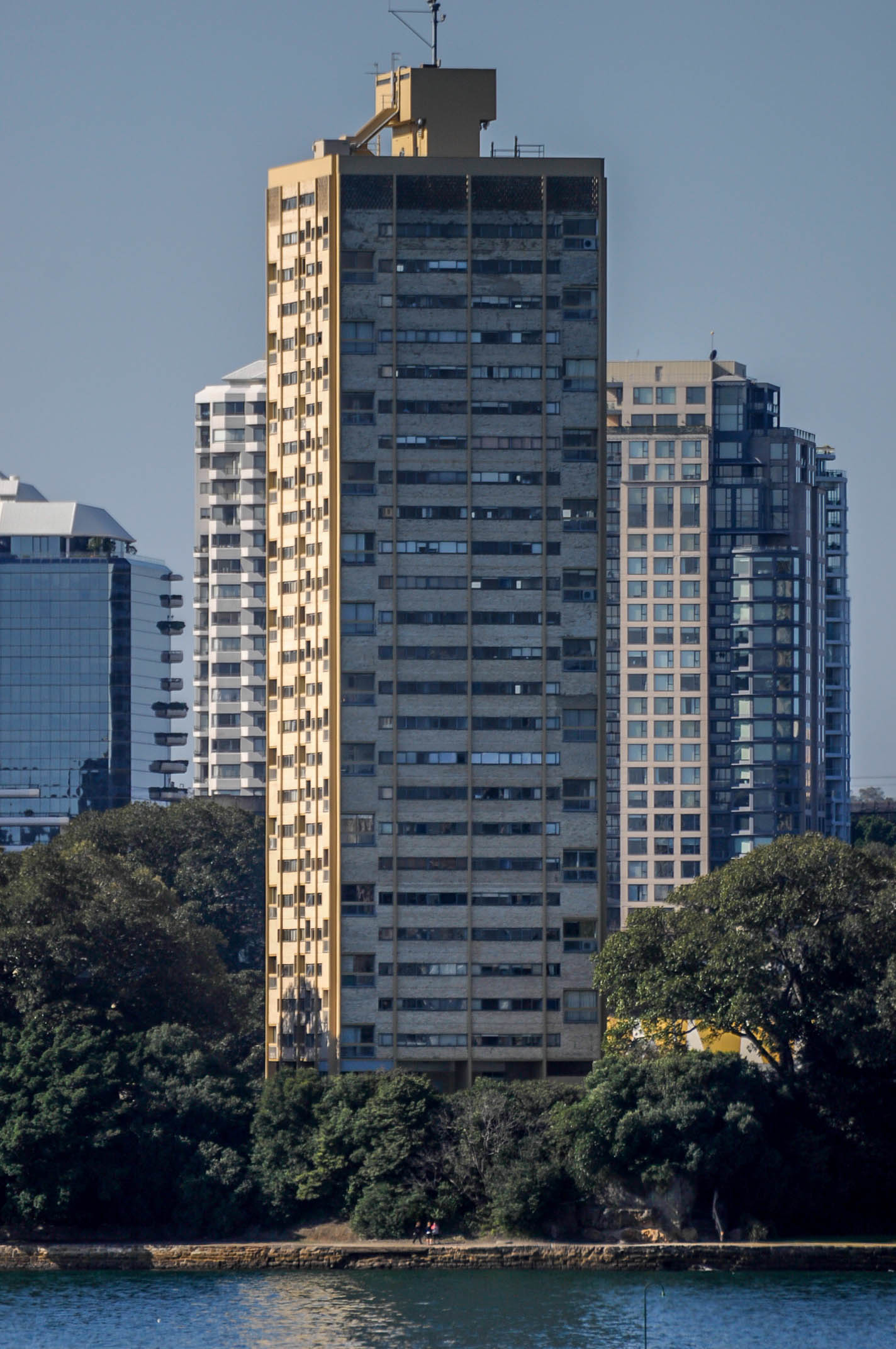
- Blues Point Tower

General information
- Status: Completed
- Type: Residential
- Architectural style: Modernist
- Location: Sydney, 14–28 Blues Point Road, McMahons Point
- Coordinates: 33°50′57″S 151°12′12″E
- Completed: 1962

Height
- Roof: 83 m (272 ft)

Technical details
- Floor count: 25

Design and construction
- Architect: Harry Seidler

Blues Point Tower is an apartment block in Sydney, Australia. Located in McMahons Point, close to North Sydney, the tower is 83 metres (272 ft) tall with 144 apartments over 24 levels. The building is regarded by some critics as one of the ugliest buildings in Sydney.

== History ==
Construction was completed in 1962, and it was Australia's tallest residential building until 1970.

The architect was Harry Seidler who with a group of other architectural volunteers had been involved in a 1957 lobbying concept for a high-density redevelopment for the entire suburb to prevent the area from being rezoned industrial. The McMahons Point and Lavender Bay Progress Association reacted to a 1957 suggestion that the area be zoned for industrial use, and asked Seidler and the architectural team of volunteers (Lyle Dunlap, Harry Howard, Richard Fitzharding, Ivan Seifert, Andrew Young, Philip Jackson, Douglas Gordon and Michael Boyle) for assistance. The volunteer architectural and planning team proposed a concept showing that McMahons Point could instead house hundreds of apartments, all with harbour views with a rectangular tourist hotel on the site where later Blues Point Tower was constructed. The lobbying was successful and the industrial re-zoning proposal was rejected.

The following year in 1958, Seidler was commissioned by Dick Dusseldorp, through his company Civil & Civic. to design a tower for the site.

The original tower design of 1958 had internal terraced balconies. Due to planning laws at the time making balconies part of the floor-space-ratio, the tower design was modified in 1959 to french balconies which is how the tower was built.

Construction started in 1960 and the tower and the construction finished late 1961. The company's site office during construction was located in an 1870s Victorian villa named Bellvue, which formerly occupied the site.. The tower was the first high rise apartment building to be strata titled and the first residents moved into the building in 1962.

In February 2011, a 6 metres (20 ft) tall maritime radar was added to the building's roof.

== Architecture and heritage value ==
The heritage listing for the Tower describes it as a "Conspicuous, though unpopular, example of Internationalist style. This landmark building was innovative in its day and intended as a forerunner of a whole movement in architecture and high-density housing".

Nonetheless Blues Point Tower is considered by many Sydney residents to be inconsistent with its surrounding buildings and cityscape. Over time, many public figures have criticised it, or even called for its demolition. However, in 1993, North Sydney Council added the building to its local heritage register.

"Come on, this is old news, stupid bloody nonsense, I'm sick to death of it. ... I've always thought Blues Point Tower is one of my best buildings and I stand by that. Anybody who can't see anything in it ought to go back to school."

— Seidler, responding to questions from journalist Stephen Lacey
