= Lorien Novalis School =

Location
- 456–460a Old Northern Road, Dural, Sydney, New South Wales; Australia; 33°42′06″S 151°00′49″E

Information
- School type: private Steiner school
- Established: 1971; 55 years ago
- Educational authority: Australian Curriculum, Assessment and Reporting Authority (ACARA)
- Head of school: Dr. Konrad Korobacz
- Teaching staff: 22.3 FTE
- Employees: 10.3 FTE (non-teaching staff)
- Years: Early learning and K–12
- Enrollment: 267 (2020)
- Area: 5 hectares (12 acres)
- Campus type: Outer suburban
- Affiliations: Association of Independent Schools NSW; Steiner Education Australia
- Website: lorien.nsw.edu.au

Lorien Novalis School for Rudolf Steiner Education is an independent, co-educational K–12 school located in Dural, in the Hills District of Sydney, Australia. Founded in 1971, the school is part of the international network of Rudolf Steiner schools and is affiliated with Steiner Education Australia.

The school offers early childhood programs through to Year 12 and bases its teaching on Steiner’s developmental, arts-rich educational philosophy. Its campus occupies approximately 15 acres of natural bushland, with biodynamic gardens, orchards, beehives, and outdoor learning spaces forming part of the everyday educational environment.

Lorien Novalis emphasises imagination, creativity and curiosity as core learning values, consistent with broader Steiner pedagogical principles. Students study a comprehensive curriculum including English, Mathematics, Sciences, Humanities, Creative and Performing Arts, Technologies, Languages, Handcrafts and Eurythmy, delivered through a holistic, interdisciplinary model.

Graduating students receive a Steiner-based school certificate rather than the ATAR credential, and may access tertiary education through portfolio entry, interviews or alternative admission pathways.

== History ==
Lorien Novalis is named after Lothlórien from Tolkien's book The Lord of the Rings and Novalis, the German poet who was inspired by works of Goethe.

The school is a member of the Association of Independent Schools NSW and Steiner Education Australia

== Curriculum ==
All students throughout the school follow a universal curriculum including English, Mathematics, Science, Social Science (History & Geography), Art, Music, Craft/Technology, Language, Performing Arts, Eurythmy, and PE/Health/PD. In the high school, students also have the opportunity through an elective program of extension work in various subjects.

Students who graduate from the school receive the Lorien Novalis Class 12 Certificate of Steiner Education. They continue to access undergraduate university courses through the STAT examination, audition/portfolio and/or interview. Classes 11 and 12 follow the school's Steiner curriculum, which does cross-map against various Preliminary and HSC subjects. Currently, these courses are credentialed by the Board of Studies NSW, in a Preliminary HSC Record of Achievement for each student. However an ATAR is unachievable even if students complete the required 10 units of subjects.

== Extracurricular activities ==
At Lorien, sports are played for enjoyment and overall well-being rather than competition. They include aquatics, athletics, badminton, basketball, dance, soccer, squash, and volleyball. High school students may choose to participate in abseiling, caving, canyoning, or rock climbing.
