= Stamford on Kent =

Skyscraper in Sydney, Australia

- Former names: Caltex House

General information
- Location: 183 Kent Street, Millers Point, Australia
- Named for: Caltex Australia
- Groundbreaking: 1955
- Completed: 1957
- Renovated: 2000

Height
- Height: 72 metres

Technical details
- Floor count: 20

Design and construction
- Architect: EM Nicholls
- Main contractor: Civil & Civic
- Known for: First all concrete skyscraper in Australia

Stamford on Kent, formerly Caltex House, is a 28-storey skyscraper in Sydney, Australia. Completed in 1957, it was the first all-concrete skyscraper in Australia.

== History ==
In 1955 Civil & Civic commenced work on a new headquarters for Caltex Australia on a site bounded by Kent Street, Gas Lane and Jenkins Street in Millers Point. It was Australia's first all concrete skyscraper and at 20 storeys, the tallest building in Australia when completed in 1957. With 425 spaces, it had the largest private car park in Australia. It also had the fastest lifts in Australia.

In August 1996, Caltex House was sold to the Stamford Hotel Group, gutted, increased in height to 28 storeys and fitted out for residential and hotel use with the work completed in early 2000. Levels 10 to 28 were converted into 157 residential apartments as the Stamford on Kent. Levels 1 to 9 were converted into hotel rooms for the 2000 Summer Olympics as the Stamford Plaza Sydney. The latter were subsequently converted to residential units.
