= Dick Dusseldorp =

Dutch engineer

Gerardus Jozef Dusseldorp AO (2 December 1918 – 22 April 2000) was a Dutch water engineer and the founder of Civil & Civic, the financing arm of which later emerged as Lendlease, one of Australia's largest companies.

== Career ==
Born in Utrecht in the Netherlands in December 1918, Gerardus Dusseldorp was known as Dik as a child, the anglicised version of which stuck with him for the rest of his life. At the age of 15, he enrolled as a marine cadet, with the aim of becoming a captain in the merchant marine. He was found to be color blind when he sought entry into officer training and withdrew from the service. During World War II, as a Dutchman of working age, he was deported to Berlin, to work as forced labor. Returning to the Netherlands, he secured work with a Danish firm building a railway from Copenhagen to Hamburg. In late 1943 he was transported to Kraków, again as forced labor but this time for the Siemens Organisation. In Summer 1944 he escaped with his wife and four-year-old daughter, and returned again to the Netherlands.

In 1945 he and his younger brother Hank secured jobs at Bredero's Bouwbedrijf, a Dutch housebuilder established in the 1870s. By 1947 he had been promoted to Construction Manager. In March 1951 Bredero's sent him to Australia to seek out business opportunities. He identified a project to build workers' housing in the Snowy Mountains Scheme, the largest infrastructure project to have been attempted in Australia. He established Civil & Civic, as a subsidiary of Bredero's, the success of which was based on the principle that the designer should be employed by the contractor rather than the other way round.

During the 1950s, 1960s and 1970s he undertook residential housing developments such as Harbour Heights Estate and was a competitor of Leslie Joseph Hooker and Hooker's housing developments. In 1957 he secured the contract to build the podium for the Sydney Opera House and, having established his reputation, built the business into an international concern. Civil & Civic built the first high rise office block, Caltex House, to be erected in Sydney. He went on to establish a publicly listed financing arm for Civil & Civic. This emerged as Lendlease of which he was chairman until his retirement in 1988. To mark his retirement, the shareholders of Lendlease gave him one million new shares, to establish the Dusseldorp Skills Forum. He initially chaired the Forum before handing over the position to his son, Tjerk, who chairs the Forum to this day. His driving vision for the Forum was that it become a creator of "lighthouse" initiatives that would influence government policy for the benefit of young people, particularly those at the margin who were there through no fault of their own. During the last decade of his life he gained recognition as a practical philanthropist.

== Honours ==
On Australia Day 1988 he was appointed an Honorary Officer of the Order of Australia.

== Family ==
He was married to Anne and together they went on to have five children. Australian actress Marta Dusseldorp is his granddaughter.

== Legacy ==
Dusseldorp was the founder of two Sydney suburbs, one of them being the prestigious Middle Cove where the Dusseldorp family lived from 1959 until 2004. The house which Dusseldorp built in Middle Cove is one of the top five house designs in Australia: it is based on Frank Lloyd Wright's inspirational honeycomb house design and is a good example of Organic Architecture.
