= Middle Cove, New South Wales =

Middle Cove
- Suburb
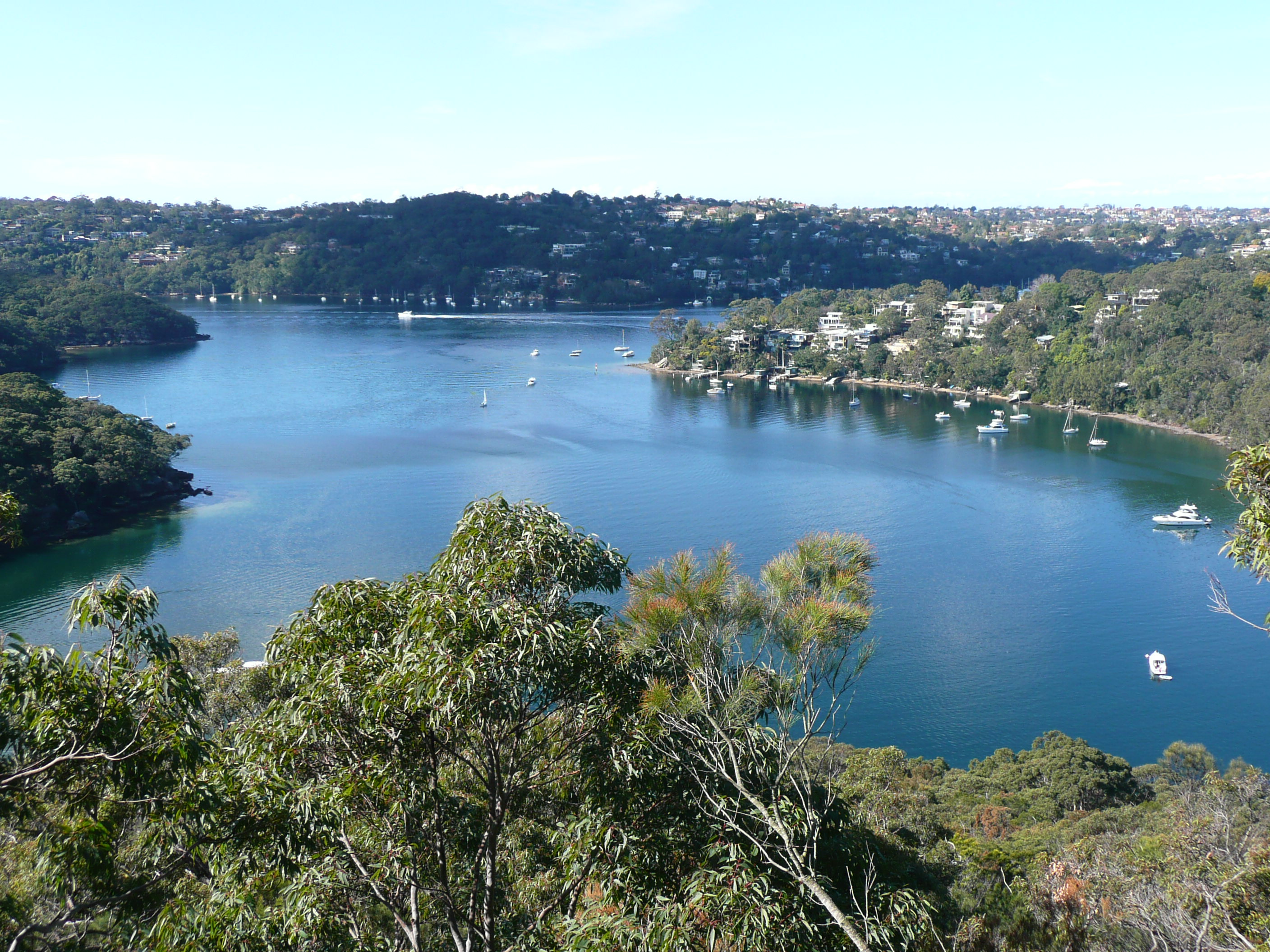
- View of Sugarloaf Bay from Harold Reid Reserve

- Interactive map of Middle Cove
- Country: Australia
- State: New South Wales
- City: Sydney
- LGA: City of Willoughby
- Location: 9 km (5.6 mi) from CBD
- Established: 1958

Government
  - State electorate: Willoughby
  - Federal division: Bradfield

Area
  - Total: 3.19 km^{2} (1.23 sq mi)

Population
  - Total: 1,327 (2021 census)
  - Density: 416.0/km^{2} (1,077.4/sq mi)
- Postcode: 2068
Suburbs around Middle Cove
| Roseville | Castle Cove | Castle Cove |
| Chatswood | Middle Cove | Seaforth |
| North Willoughby | Castlecrag | Castlecrag |

Willoughby Municipality

Middle Cove is a suburb on the Lower North Shore of Sydney, in the state of New South Wales, Australia 9 kilometres north of the Sydney central business district, in the local government area of the City of Willoughby.

Middle Cove is bounded to the north, east and south by Middle Harbour and to the west by Eastern Valley Way. Middle Cove shares its postcode, 2068, with the surrounding suburbs of Castlecrag and Willoughby North.

In 2016 Middle Cove was ranked in the top 30 of Sydney's most liveable suburbs.

== History ==
Middle Cove takes its name from its location between two coves, Castle Cove and Crag Cove. The suburb was undeveloped bushland until 1957 when Dick Dusseldorp bought most of the land from the NSW government and subdivided Middle Cove as we know it today. Dusseldorp was the founder and the largest share holder of Lend Lease, GPT and MLC. The Dusseldorps lived in Middle Cove until the patriarch death in 2000, the house which Dusseldorp built in Middle Cove is one of the top five house designs in Australia: it is based on Frank Lloyd Wright's inspirational honeycomb house design and is a good example of Organic Architecture.

More recently, record prices have been seen for properties within Middle Cove which have sought to take advantage of its unique location and vista by combining it with exemplary architectural design. Examples include the Glynn Nicholls (son of Eric Nicholls who was a partner of the renowned Walter Burley Griffin) designed house along The Quarterdeck and architect James Pedersen's designed house on Highland Ridge Road. The latter set a new price record for the suburb in 2016 when it sold for more than A$4.3 million.

=== Aboriginal culture ===
Before European settlement, this area was populated by the Aboriginal tribe Cammeraygal, which lends its name to the nearby suburb of Cammeray. Governor Phillip in a dispatch of 1790 reported: "...About the north-west part of this harbour there is a tribe which is mentioned as being very powerful, either from their numbers or the abilities of their chief. This district is called Cammerra, the head of the tribe is named Cammerragal, by which name the men of that tribe are distinguished. Of these Bands, we know more about the Cammeraygals. They are recorded as being a very powerful people and by far the most numerous. They were also the most robust and muscular and had the extraordinary privilege of extracting a tooth from the natives of other Bands and Tribes inhabiting the sea-coast."

== Population ==
In the 2021 Census, there were 1,327 people in Middle Cove. 63.1% of people were born in Australia and 76.7% of people only spoke English at home. The most common responses for religion were No Religion 43.0%, Catholic 24.9%, Anglican 13.6% and Buddhism 2.1%.

== Commercial area ==
Middle Cove has a small shopping centre on Eastern Valley Way that features small businesses. however Middle Cove's proximity to Chatswood, makes the suburb one of the best serviced suburbs in Australia.

== Parks ==
Harold Reid Reserve is a large park overlooking Sugarloaf Bay, and brings many visitors to the area. It is named in honour of Harold J. Reid (1896-1984), a town clerk for the Municipality of Willoughby for over 50 years. The park includes lookouts, walking trails and picnic facilities. It has also been declared a protected area for wildlife, which includes goannas, sugar gliders, buff-banded rails, swamp wallabies, snakes and eastern spinebills.

== Transport ==
Busways and CDC NSW provides bus services which run along Eastern Valley Way.

Busways Bus routes 206 (via freeway, peak hour only), 207 and 208 (via Northbridge) operate via Castlecrag and Cammeray to Gresham Street bus stop in the Sydney central business district. Peak hour bus route 209 run along the same route to Milsons Point via Miller Street. Limited bus service 275 goes to Chatswood railway station which is on the North Shore line.

CDC NSW Route 194 provides all day services to Queen Victoria Building via Northbridge Junction and Warringah Freeway.

== Gallery ==
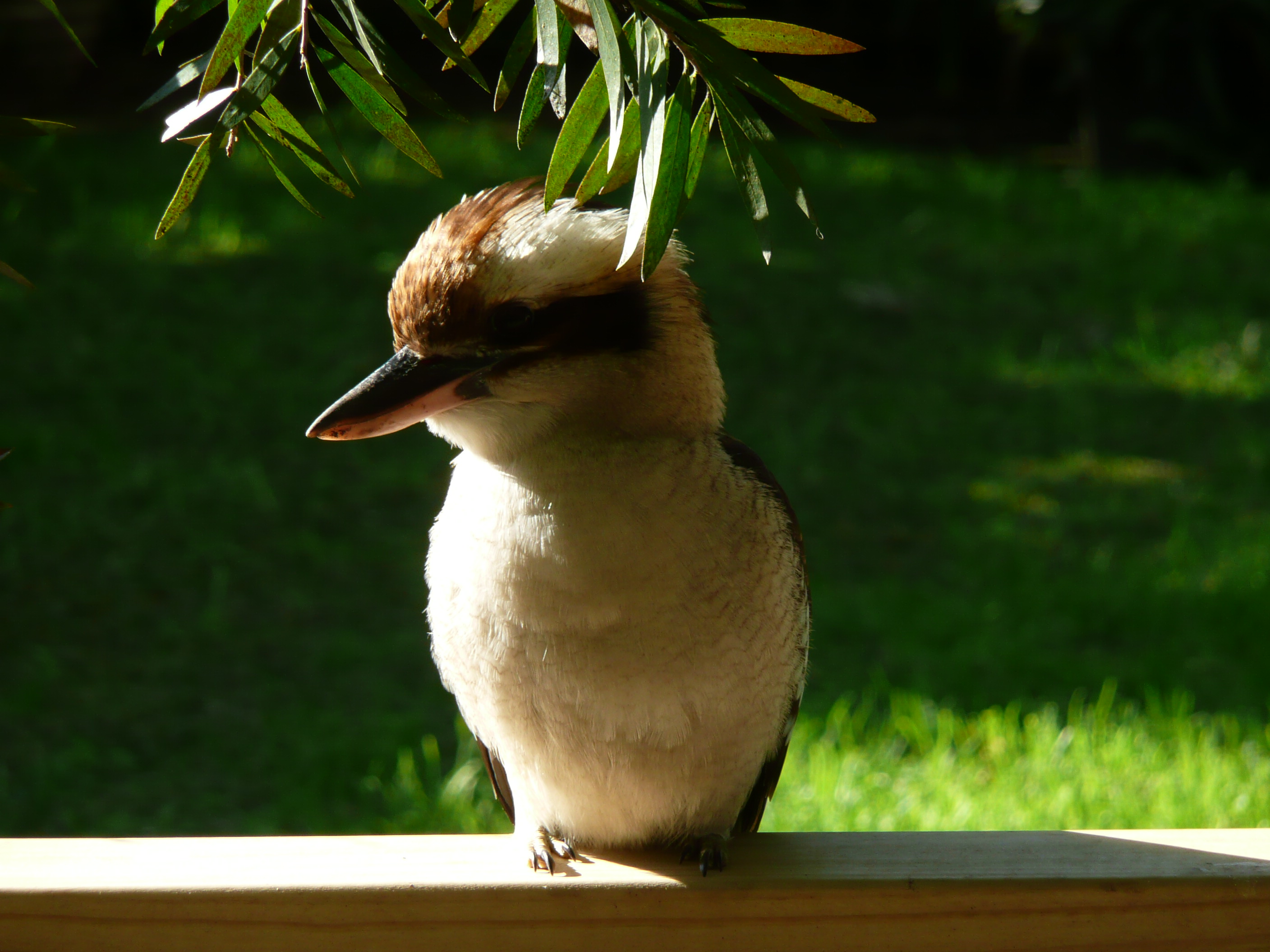
Kookaburra in North Arm Road

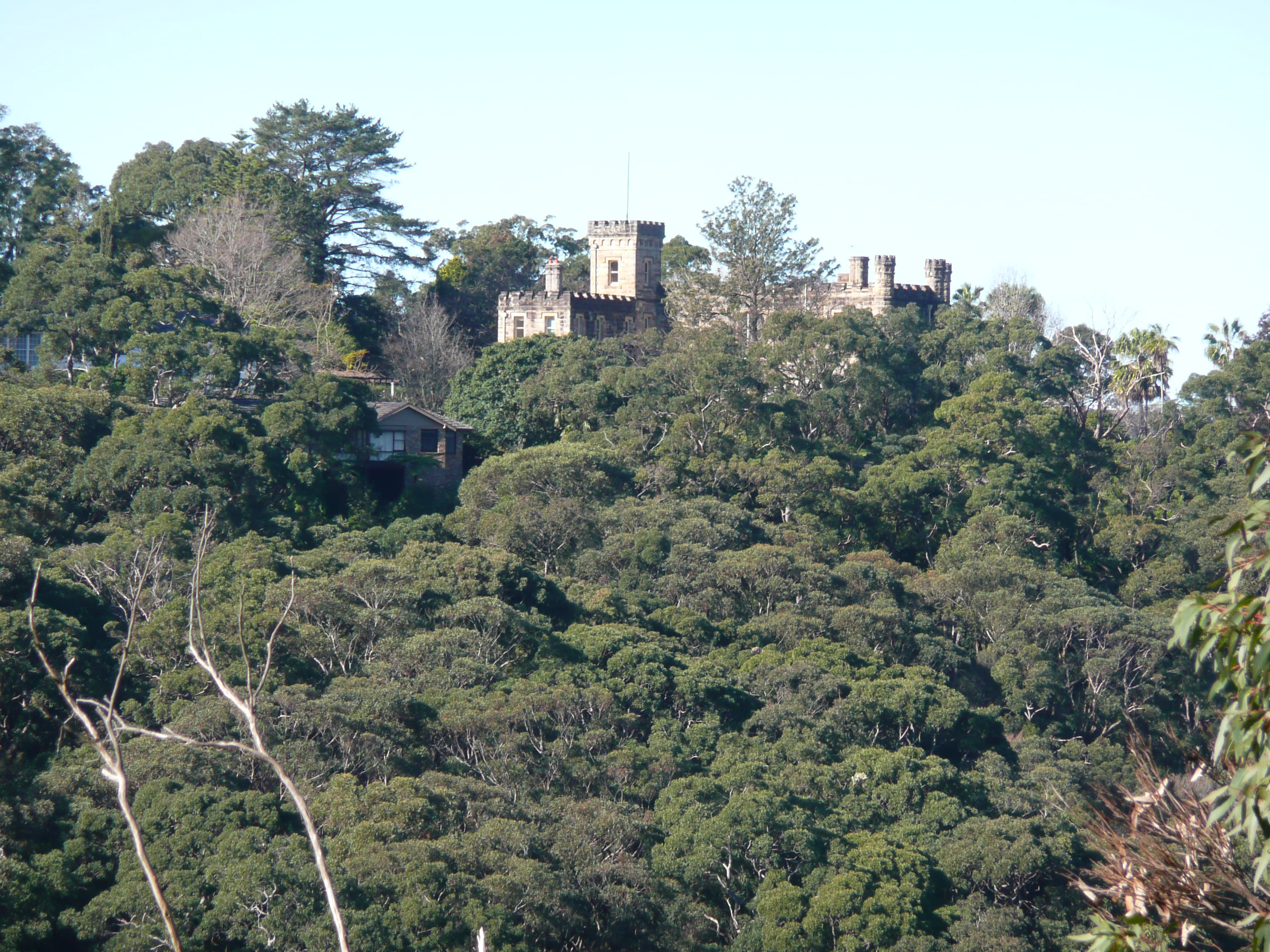
View of Innisfail Castle from North Arm Road

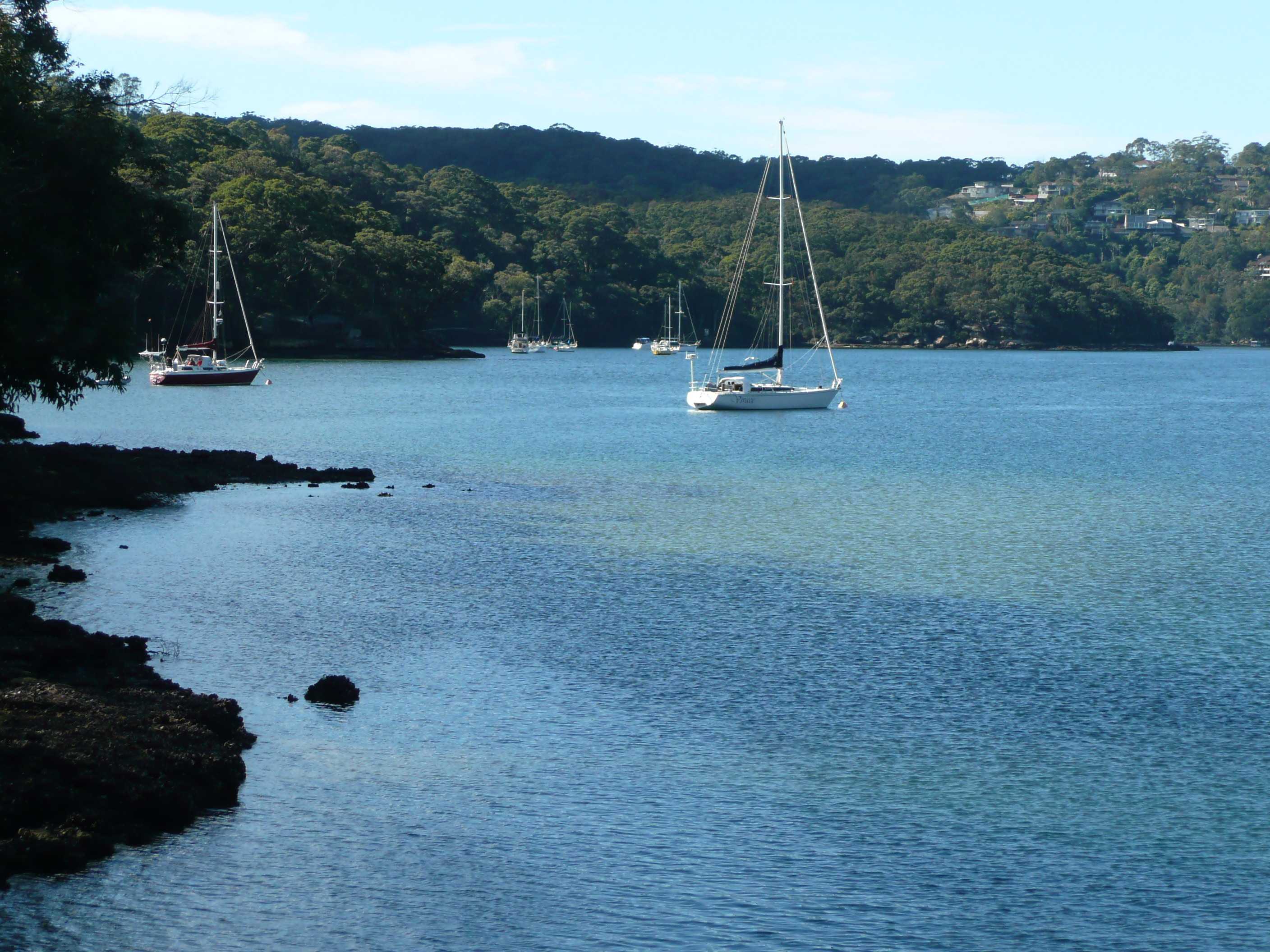
Sugarloaf Bay seen from Harold Reid Reserve
