= Marie Bashir =

Australian psychiatrist and viceroy (1930–2026)

The Honourable Dame Marie Bashir AD CVO FTSE
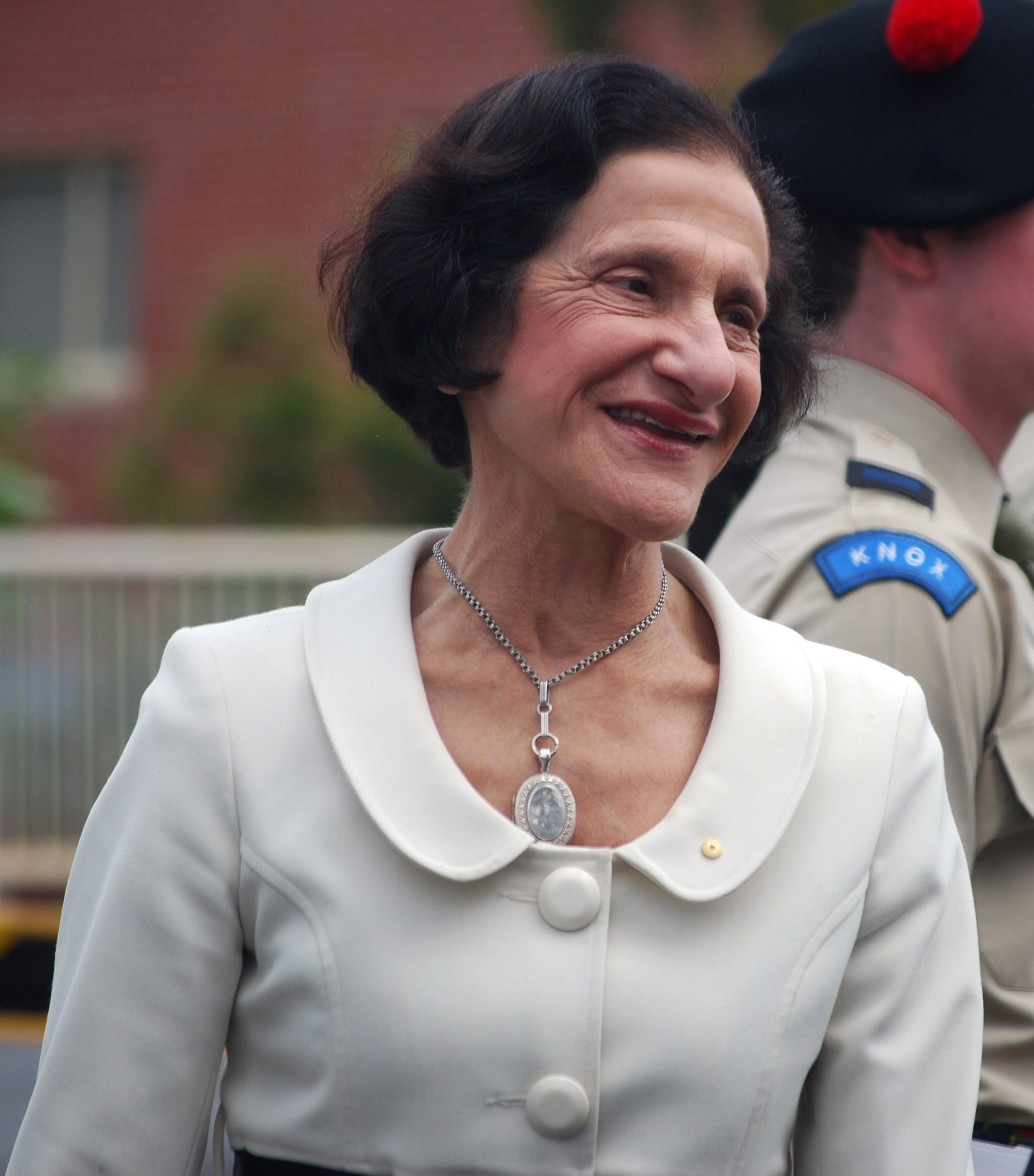
- Bashir in 2008

37th Governor of New South Wales
- In office 1 March 2001 – 1 October 2014
- Monarch: Elizabeth II
- Premier: Bob Carr; Morris Iemma; Nathan Rees; Kristina Keneally; Barry O'Farrell; Mike Baird
- Lieutenant: James Spigelman; Tom Bathurst
- Preceded by: Gordon Samuels
- Succeeded by: David Hurley

17th Chancellor of the University of Sydney
- In office 1 June 2007 – 15 December 2012
- Vice‑Chancellor: Gavin Brown; Michael Spence
- Preceded by: Kim Santow
- Succeeded by: Belinda Hutchinson

Personal details
- Born: Marie Roslyn Bashir; 1 December 1930 Narrandera, New South Wales, Australia
- Died: 20 January 2026 (aged 95)
- Spouse: Nicholas Shehadie (m. 1957; died 2018)
- Children: 3
- Education: University of Sydney
- Occupation: Psychiatrist
- Profession: Psychiatry

Dame Marie Roslyn Bashir (1 December 1930 – 20 January 2026) was an Australian psychiatrist and administrator who served as the 37th Governor of New South Wales from 2001 to 2014 and concurrently as the 17th chancellor of the University of Sydney from 2007 to 2012.

Born in Narrandera, New South Wales, Bashir graduated from the University of Sydney in 1956 and held various medical positions, with a particular emphasis in psychiatry. In 1993 Bashir was appointed the Clinical Director of Mental Health Services for the Central Sydney Area Health Service, a position she held until her appointment to the governorship.

Bashir retired after holding the office for over 13 years, being the second-longest serving Governor of New South Wales, stating she did not want to surpass the length of service of war hero Sir Roden Cutler. She was succeeded by General David Hurley.

== Early life and education ==
Marie Roslyn Bashir was born in 1930 in Narrandera, New South Wales, to Lebanese Christian parents Michael Bashir and Victoria Melick. Her father and her paternal uncle were both medical graduates from the American University of Beirut. Her maternal family had come to Australia in the 19th century.

Bashir attended Narrandera Public School and in 1943 enrolled at Sydney Girls High School, which her mother had also attended. Bashir lived in Sydney with her grandmother during this time. Upon graduating in 1947, Bashir studied at the Sydney Conservatorium of Music, becoming a proficient violinist.

Bashir completed the dual degrees of Bachelor of Medicine and Bachelor of Surgery (MBBS) in 1956 at the Sydney Medical School at the University of Sydney, residing at The Women's College from 1950 to 1955. In 1959, she was elected to the college council, became the honorary secretary in 1960 and chair from 1982 to 1990. She took up life membership for the college union in 1969.

While at university, she met rising rugby player Nicholas Shehadie, to whom she was married on 23 February 1957 at St Philip's Church, Sydney, by Felix Arnott, then the warden of St Paul's College, University of Sydney.

== Medical career ==
Upon her graduation in medicine, Bashir took up a posting as a junior resident medical officer at St Vincent's Hospital in Sydney and then to the Royal Alexandra Hospital for Children. After first living in Elizabeth Bay, Bashir and Shehadie moved their family to Pendle Hill in Western Sydney where Bashir worked as a general practitioner. However, wanting to assist people suffering from mental illnesses, Bashir eventually decided to take up postgraduate studies in psychiatry. To make this easier, in 1968 Bashir and her family moved to the inner suburb of Mosman on Sydney's North Shore, purchasing a Middle Harbour-waterfront house at 7 Shellbank Avenue for $57,000 from yachtsman Gordon Reynolds. This would be their primary residence until its sale in May 2020.

When Shehadie was made Lord Mayor of Sydney, Bashir became the Lady Mayoress of Sydney from 1973 to 1975. In 1974 she was named as "Mother of the Year" by the New South Wales Child Care Committee and the National Council of Women in the state, with Bashir noting "the fact that I, as a professional woman, was chosen as Mother of the Year points to the growing social acceptance of a working mother". When Shehadie was knighted in 1976, Bashir acquired the courtesy title "Lady Shehadie"; however, she chose not to use it, retaining her own name, "Marie Bashir", in professional life. After completion of postgraduate studies in psychiatry, she was made a member of the Royal Australian and New Zealand College of Psychiatrists in 1971, becoming a fellow in 1980. From 1972, Bashir was a teacher, lecturer and mentor to medical students at The University of Sydney.

In 1972, Bashir was appointed founding director of the Rivendell Child, Adolescent and Family Service, which provides consultative services for young people with emotional and psychiatric issues. In 1977 she oversaw the unit's move to the former Thomas Walker Convalescent Hospital in Concord West, following its acquisition by the New South Wales Health Commission in 1976. In 1987 she was appointed director of the community health services in the Central Sydney Area Health Service, which put emphasis on early childhood services, migrant and Indigenous health as well as the elderly. On 13 June 1988 she was made an Officer of the Order of Australia (AO) "In recognition of service to medicine, particularly in the field of adolescent mental health."

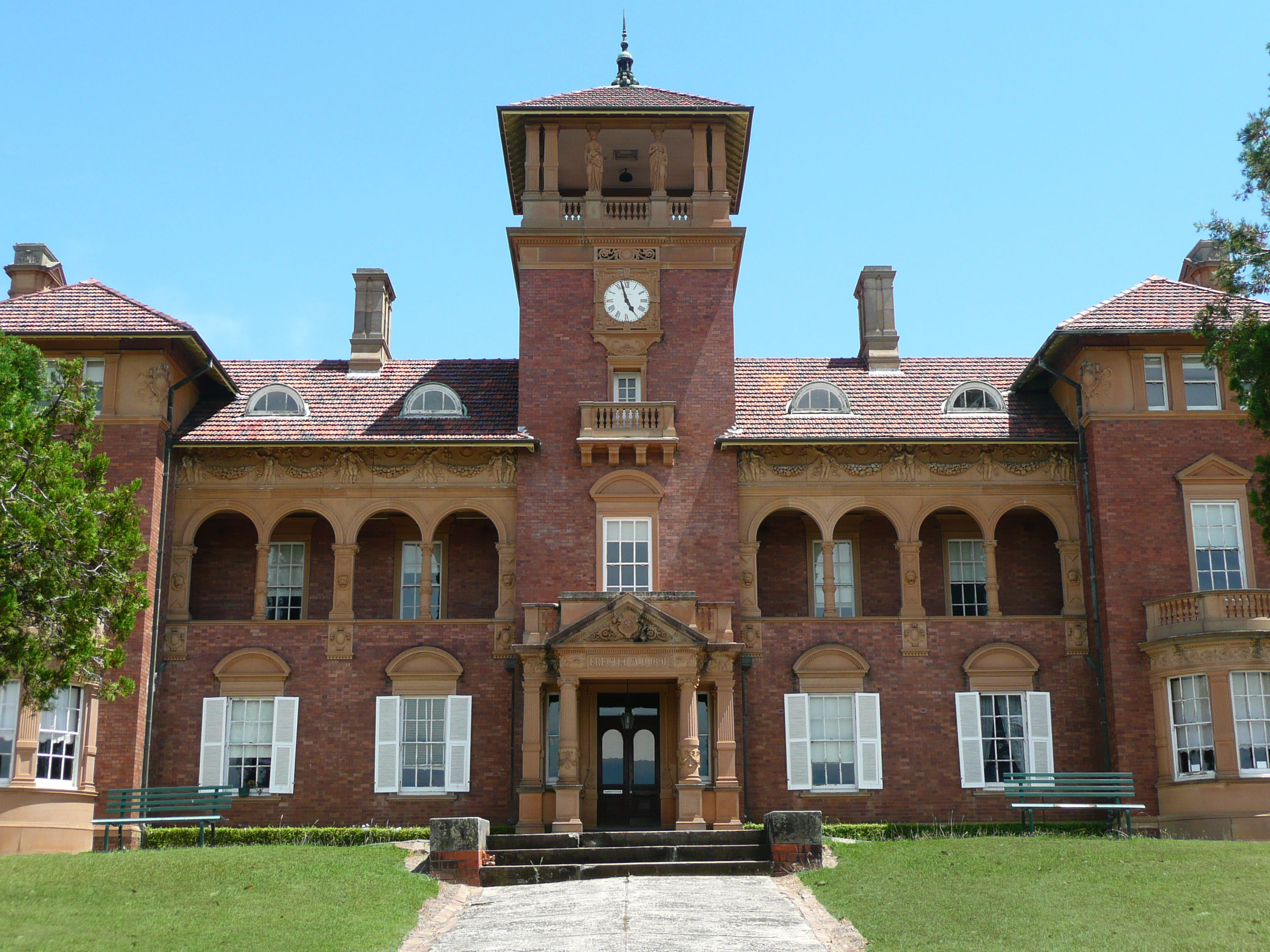
The Rivendell Unit in Concord West, where Bashir served as founding Director, 1972–1988

From 1990 to 1992, Bashir served on the New South Wales Women's Advisory Council. In 1993, she was appointed Clinical Professor of Psychiatry at the University of Sydney, and in 1994 as the Clinical Director of Mental Health Services for the Central Sydney Area Health Service. This was a time of major reform in mental health service delivery, which contributed to substantial change in the provision of public sector mental health services. She served until 2001. In her university role, Bashir was instrumental in developing collaborative teaching programs between colleagues in Vietnam and Thailand with Australian psychiatrists, chairing the University of New South Wales' Third World Health Group (1995–2000) and supporting various financial and social support programs for international students.

In 1995, in a partnership with the Aboriginal Medical Service in Redfern, she established the Aboriginal Mental Health Unit, which provides regular clinics and counselling at both the Aboriginal Medical Service in Sydney and mainstream centres. From 1996, Bashir also took up the consultative role of senior psychiatrist to the Aboriginal Medical Service. Whilst championing the health of Indigenous Australians, Bashir continued her focus on youth and juvenile issues, particularly through her terms chairing the New South Wales Juvenile Justice Advisory Council (1991–1999) and as a consultative psychiatrist to Juvenile Justice Facilities (1993–2000). On 1 January 2001, Bashir was awarded the Centenary Medal.

== Governor of New South Wales ==
In early 2001, on the recommendation of the Premier of New South Wales, Bob Carr, Elizabeth II, Queen of Australia appointed Bashir as Governor of New South Wales, making her the state's first female governor and also the first person of Lebanese descent to be appointed as governor of any Australian state. She was sworn in on 1 March 2001 and on 30 March was made a Companion of the Order of Australia (AC). Upon her appointment, Sydney Morning Herald journalist David Marr noted, "what could be more valuable behind the scenes in Macquarie Street than this woman's unique expertise with troubled adolescents?" Bashir's appointment was welcomed by both sides of politics and commended in a Sydney Morning Herald editorial as "an inspired choice" as well as noting that Bashir would be "a powerful advocate for the powerless".

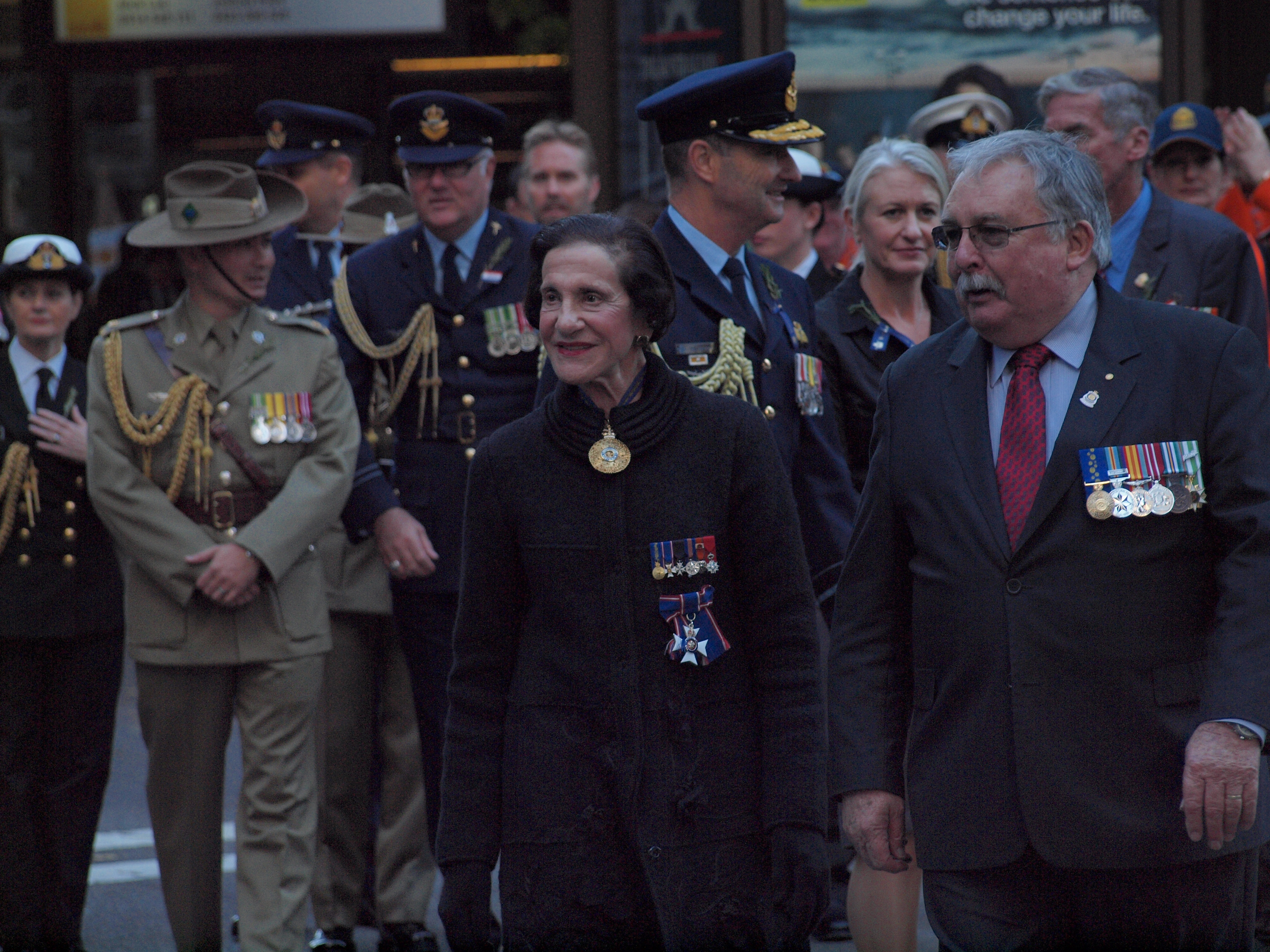
Bashir taking part in the Anzac Day parade in Sydney, 2013

In the governor's role, Bashir departed from past practice. For Indigenous Australians, she launched a health initiative to support Indigenous medicine and nursing students as well as supporting the progress of reconciliation. On the very day of her inauguration, Bashir agreed to become Patron of the Gay and Lesbian Counselling Service, which addresses mental and social issues in the LGBT community. This was the first time a NSW governor had supported a gay organisation. In 2005 Bashir opened the Sydney Gay and Lesbian Mardi Gras Festival in a concert in Hyde Park and credited the event with fostering "that sense of freedom which springs from the considerable diversity within our society – diversity of race, religion, culture and also sexual orientation [...] We must never take these things for granted because most of you would agree that across the world today an extraordinary winding back to many previously discarded attitudes is taking place, not only affecting gay and lesbian groups, but women's health and many aspects of social justice".

On 14 September 2011, Liberal Premier Barry O'Farrell announced that he had recommended to the Queen that Bashir's term be extended for another two years to 2014, which had been accepted: "Over the past 10 years the Governor's caring nature, her genuine interest in local communities and her extraordinary work rate have endeared her to people everywhere...Because of her diverse background, career and interests, Professor Bashir has given a historic and important post a contemporary relevance and resonance."

From the time of her commencement as governor, Bashir, like her immediate predecessor, did not reside in Government House, Sydney, retaining it for reception and official purposes. However, in October 2011, the new Premier Barry O'Farrell announced that Bashir had agreed with O'Farrell's offer to move back into Government House: "A lot of people believe the Governor should live at Government House. That's what it was built for ... [A]t some stage a rural or regional governor will be appointed and we will need to provide accommodation at Government House so it makes sense to provide appropriate living areas". However, because Government House had not been a residence for fifteen years, O'Farrell also announced that Bashir would initially move into a smaller adjacent building, called the chalet, while refurbishments of the main wing occurred, with a proposed move into the main house later in the year.

As the longest-serving incumbent state governor, Bashir held a dormant commission to act as the Administrator of the Commonwealth when the Governor-General of Australia was absent from Australia. She held the position of Administrator many times: from 10 to 17 July 2007, 30 September to 12 October 2007, and 20 April to 4 May 2008 in the absence of Michael Jeffery, and from 30 July to 6 August 2008, 5 to 19 November 2008, 17 March to 2 April 2009, and 7 to 12 June 2010, in the absence of Quentin Bryce.

== Other roles and honours ==
In 2002, Bashir became patron of the Australia-Vietnam Medical Trust and became intimately involved in collaborative health programs in Vietnam, particularly in rural areas. On 17 May 2001, the governor-general, Sir William Deane, invested Bashir as a Dame of Grace of the Most Venerable Order of the Hospital of St John of Jerusalem (DStJ). Having previously studied violin at the Conservatorium of Music, Sydney, in 2002 Bashir was asked to become the Patron of the Sydney University Graduate Choir. She was also a Patron of Opera Australia, the Sydney Symphony Orchestra, Sydney Philharmonia Choirs, Pinchgut Opera and the Australian Archaeological Institute at Athens.

In 2003 Bashir received the Mental Health Princess Award, awarded by Princess Galyani Vadhana of Thailand, for contribution to collaborative mental health programs between Australia and Thailand, and in 2004 she was recognised as an Australian Living Treasure. In 2004 she was made an honorary Member of the United Nations Development Fund for Women (UNIFEM). In March 2004, during a visit to Lebanon, Bashir was appointed a Grand Officer of the National Order of the Cedar by General Emile Lahoud, President of the Republic of Lebanon. On 14 September, Premier Carr announced that he would recommend to the Queen that Bashir's term be extended for another three years. Buckingham Palace confirmed his recommendation on 1 October saying that: "The Queen is content for Her Excellency Professor Marie Bashir AC, to remain in her current position until February 2008 as recommended."

On 31 March 2006, the Queen appointed her a Commander of the Royal Victorian Order (CVO).

In June 2006, Bashir was involved in a high-profile legal case brought to the Administrative Decisions Tribunal between a psychiatrist named Brendan O' Sullivan and the Sydney South West Area Health Service. Bashir had been falsely cited in the case by the Area Health Service's CEO Mike Wallace; however, as Governor she was able to avoid giving evidence in the tribunal by claiming sovereign immunity, a legal doctrine that prevents a sovereign or state from being subject to the laws it creates.

In April 2007 Bashir was elected by the University Senate to take up a four-year appointment as Chancellor of the University of Sydney, commencing 1 June 2007. It was announced on 15 October 2007 that the Queen, on the recommendation of Premier Morris Iemma, had extended Bashir's appointment as governor for a further four years to February 2012. On 4 November 2009, she was invested as a Chevalier of the Ordre National de la Légion d'Honneur by the then President of France, Nicolas Sarkozy, and presented by the Ambassador of France to Australia, Michel Filhol.

In May and June 2010, the New South Wales Government experienced a series of resignations: Karyn Paluzzano over expenses abuse, David Campbell over a personal scandal, Ian Macdonald over expenses abuse, and the retirement of Graham West. These were widely seen as highlighting the NSW Government's inability to govern effectively and in response to this there were various calls for Bashir to take action as governor and dismiss the government. She played down these calls in a radio interview on 10 June, saying that:

The only way that they [the NSW Government] can disappear, so to speak, is if there's a vote of no confidence... Elections do come round from time to time so it's back in the hands of the people.

In late 2010, Mosman Municipal Council named a new sports centre in Rawson Park in Bashir's honour, in recognition of her service to both New South Wales and the Mosman community. She officially opened the "Marie Bashir Mosman Sports Centre" on 10 December 2010 with the mayor, Anne Connon.

On 19 April 2012, Bashir was presented with the insignia of a Grand Cordon of the National Order of the Cedar by the President of Lebanon, General Michel Suleiman, at Government House, Sydney, during his state visit to Australia. At a meeting of the University of Sydney Senate in May 2012, Bashir announced her intention to retire as Chancellor. At a ceremony marking her retirement as Chancellor, her portrait depicting Bashir as Chancellor by Shen Jiawei was unveiled, to hang in the Great Hall. Also in April, it was announced that Bashir's term as governor, which had been expected to expire in February 2014, had been extended another six months to September 2014, at which Bashir expressed her intention to retire.

On 26 May 2013, Bashir was promoted to the rank of Officer within the Ordre National de la Légion d'Honneur by the then President of France, François Hollande, and invested with the insignia at a ceremony at Government House Sydney by Général Regis Outtier, Secretary General of the Society of the Légion d'Honneur.

On 21 October 2013 Premier O'Farrell and the Minister for Education Adrian Piccoli announced that the new state primary school in Strathfield on the old site of the Sydney Adventist College would be named the "Marie Bashir Public School" in her honour. At the announcement O'Farrell noted that: "Naming this school after Professor Bashir honours her outstanding contribution to NSW and is a reminder that she achieved all her distinctions after being educated at public schools – from Narrandera Public School to Sydney Girls High School". On 28 November 2013 the Premier of NSW announced that the Queen had given approval for the title of "The Honourable" to be accorded to the governors and former governors of New South Wales.

On 5 December 2013, the University of Sydney decided to rename the Sydney Emerging Infections and Biosecurity Institute in her honour to become the Marie Bashir Institute for Infectious Diseases and Biosecurity. Also in December 2013, Bashir became patron of the NAISDA Foundation.

In the 2014 Queen's Birthday Honours, Bashir was made a Dame of the Order of Australia "For extraordinary and pre-eminent achievement and merit in service to the administration, public life, and people of New South Wales, to medicine, particularly as an advocate for improved mental health outcomes for the young, marginalised and disadvantaged, to international relations, through the promotion of collaborative health programs, and as a leader in tertiary education".

In September 2014, her official portrait as governor by Archibald Prize finalist Mathew Lynn was unveiled at Government House by Premier Mike Baird.

In November 2014, the Professor Marie Bashir Centre was opened at Royal Prince Alfred Hospital, Camperdown. The centre houses specialised units including a Short Stay Unit, Acute Mental Health unit, the Peter Beumont Eating Disorders unit, as well as the Naarmuru Mother and Baby unit.

== Retirement ==
Ahead of her impending retirement from office on 1 October 2014, Bashir noted that the time was right for her to go, just short of the record in office set by Sir Roden Cutler: "a war hero who lost a leg serving this country, I would like to think of him as the longest-serving governor... for whom I had the greatest admiration and respect".

She was succeeded by General David Hurley.

=== Continuing roles ===
Bashir made clear at the time of her retirement her interest in continuing her community work, particularly through the area of post-traumatic stress disorder in Australian Defence Force veterans.

As of November 2020 Bashir was one of three patrons of the Australian Indigenous Education Foundation. Her role as patron of the NAISDA Foundation continued as of December 2021.

=== Death ===
Bashir died on 20 January 2026 at the age of 95. Premier Chris Minns announced that she would be honoured with a state funeral.

== Titles, styles and honours ==
=== Titles ===
Viceregal styles of Dame Marie Bashir
- Reference style: Her Excellency
- Spoken style: Your Excellency

Bashir's style and title as governor in full was: Her Excellency Professor The Honourable Dame Marie Bashir, Dame of the Order of Australia, Commander of the Royal Victorian Order, Governor of the State of New South Wales in the Commonwealth of Australia.

=== Honours ===
==== National and international ====
Dame of the Order of Australia (AD)	2014
Companion of the Order of Australia (AC)	2001
Officer of the Order of Australia (AO)	1988
Commander of the Royal Victorian Order (CVO)	2006
Dame of Grace of the Order of St John of Jerusalem	2001
Centenary Medal	2001
Grand Cordon of the National Order of the Cedar (Lebanon)	2012
Grand Officer of the National Order of the Cedar (Lebanon)	2004
Officer of the Legion of Honour (France)	2014
Chevalier of the Legion of Honour (France)	2009

==== State ====
Commissioner's Commendation for Service	22 August 2014 – Awarded by the New South Wales Police Force
Commissioner's Sesquicentenary Unit Citation	22 August 2014 – Awarded by the New South Wales Police Force
Medal of the Library Council of New South Wales	21 October 2014 – Awarded by the State Library of New South Wales
Distinguished Service Medal – Gold	October 2016 – Awarded by The Duke of Edinburgh's Award

==== Appointments ====
- (Australia) 1980 Fellow of the Royal Australian and New Zealand College of Psychiatrists (FRANZCP).
- 2004 Honorary Member of the United Nations Development Fund for Women.
- (Australia) 2006 Honorary Fellow of the Australian Academy of Technological Sciences and Engineering (Hon.FTSE).
- (Australia) 2007 Honorary Member of the Australian Medical Association.

==== Honorary degrees ====
- (Australia) 3 May 2002: Honorary Doctorate of the University (D.Univ.) by the Australian Catholic University.
- (New South Wales) 11 October 2002: Honorary Doctor of Medicine (MD) by the University of Sydney.
- (New South Wales) 13 November 2004: Honorary Doctorate of the University (D.Univ.) by Southern Cross University at its Lismore Campus.
- 2004: Honorary Doctor of Science (D.Sc.) by the University of New South Wales.
- (New South Wales) 2007: Honorary Doctor of Science (D.Sc.) by the University of Wollongong.
- (New South Wales) 20 April 2012: Honorary Doctorate of the University (D.Univ.) by Macquarie University.
- (New South Wales) 17 April 2014: Honorary Doctor of Letters (D.Litt.) by the University of Western Sydney.

==== Honorary appointments ====
- (Australia) 1 March 2001: Honorary and Regimental Colonel in the Royal New South Wales Regiment.
- 1 March 2001: Honorary Air Commodore of No. 22 Squadron Royal Australian Air Force.
- 9 October 2008: Honorary Commodore, Navy Warfare Training, Royal Australian Navy.
- 22 August 2014: Honorary Governor of the New South Wales Police Force.

==== Honorific eponyms ====
Awards

- Marie Bashir Peace Awards, National Council of Women of New South Wales.

Aircraft

- Boeing 737 Large Air Tanker 'Marie Bashir', New South Wales Rural Fire Service.

Institutions and buildings

- Marie Bashir Mosman Sports Centre, Mosman.
- Marie Bashir Public School, Strathfield.
- Marie Bashir Institute for Infectious Diseases and Biosecurity (MBI), University of Sydney.
- Governor Marie Bashir Reading Room, State Library of New South Wales.
- Professor Marie Bashir Centre, Royal Prince Alfred Hospital, Camperdown.

== Publications ==
- Bashir, Marie; Schwarz, Michael (1988). "Asia in Australia: From Adversity to Resiliency and Strength: Some Aspects of the Mental Health of Asian Refugee Children". In Bennett, David; Williams, Murray (eds.). New Universals: Adolescent Health in a Time of Change. Curtin, ACT: Brolga Press for the Australian Association for Adolescent Health. pp. 35–38. ISBN 0958830959.
- Bashir, Marie; Bennett, David, eds. (2000). Deeper Dimensions: Culture, Youth and Mental Health. Parramatta, NSW: Transcultural Mental Health Centre. ISBN 1876109874.
- Bashir, Marie (March 2004). "Langford Oration 2003 [The Challenges Facing Medical Administration and a Biographical Account of Sir Robert Garran]". Quarterly (Royal Australian College of Medical Administrators). 37 (1): 5–9. ISSN 1325-7579.
- Bashir, Marie; Hush, Noel (October 2010). "Sir Bruce Williams: A Thirst to Know, and a Reverence for Truth". Quadrant. 54 (10): 66–68. ISSN 0033-5002.

Honorary titles
Preceded by Edith Port	Lady Mayoress of Sydney; 1973–1975	Succeeded by Jean Griffin
Government offices
Preceded by Gordon Samuels	Governor of New South Wales; 2001–2014	Succeeded by David Hurley
Academic offices
Preceded by Kim Santow	Chancellor of the University of Sydney; 2007–2012	Succeeded by Belinda Hutchinson
