= Concord Foreshore Trail =

Walking track in Sydney, Australia

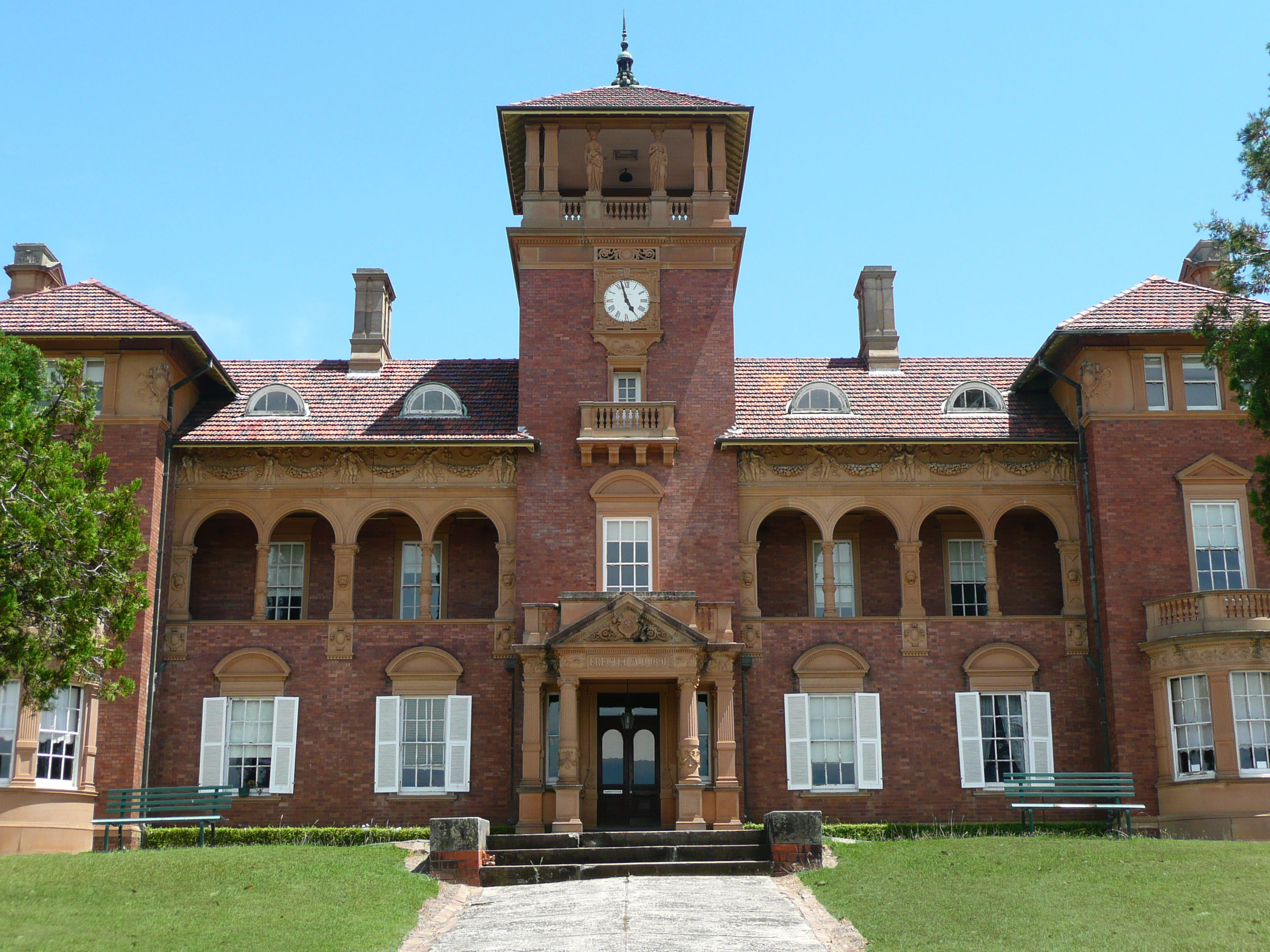
The former Thomas Walker Hospital

The Concord Foreshore Trail is a walking track in the inner-west of Sydney, Australia.

== Description ==
The Concord Foreshore Trail is located entirely within the local government area of the City of Canada Bay, Australia, and stretches from McIlwaine Park in the suburb of Rhodes to Majors Bay Reserve in Concord. The trail encircles the mangrove-fringed Brays Bay, Yaralla Bay and Majors Bay on the Parramatta River. The Foreshore Trail takes about an hour to walk and is known for its quiet country setting within a city environment.

After McIlwaine Park, the trail goes around the fringes of the former Thomas Walker Hospital, a heritage-listed building now used as the Rivendell Child, Adolescent and Family Unit. It then continues around Concord Repatriation General Hospital, located on Yaralla Bay, and past the Yaralla Estate, one of the oldest estates in Sydney, dating back to 1797. Yaralla was the family home of Thomas Walker, the philanthropist whose estate financed the building of the Thomas Walker hospital. The walk then finishes at Majors Bay, Concord.

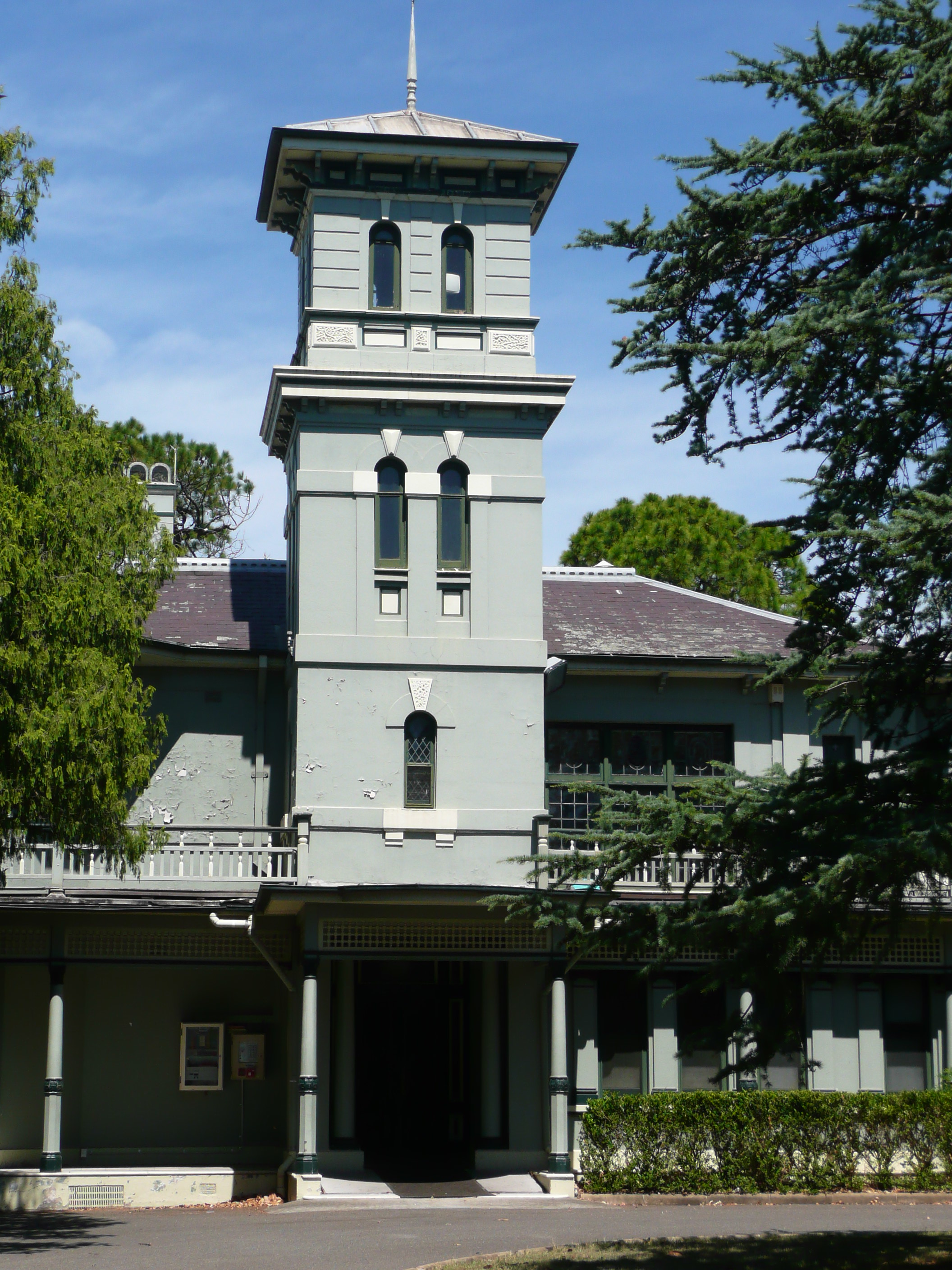
Yaralla
