= Concord High School (Sydney) =

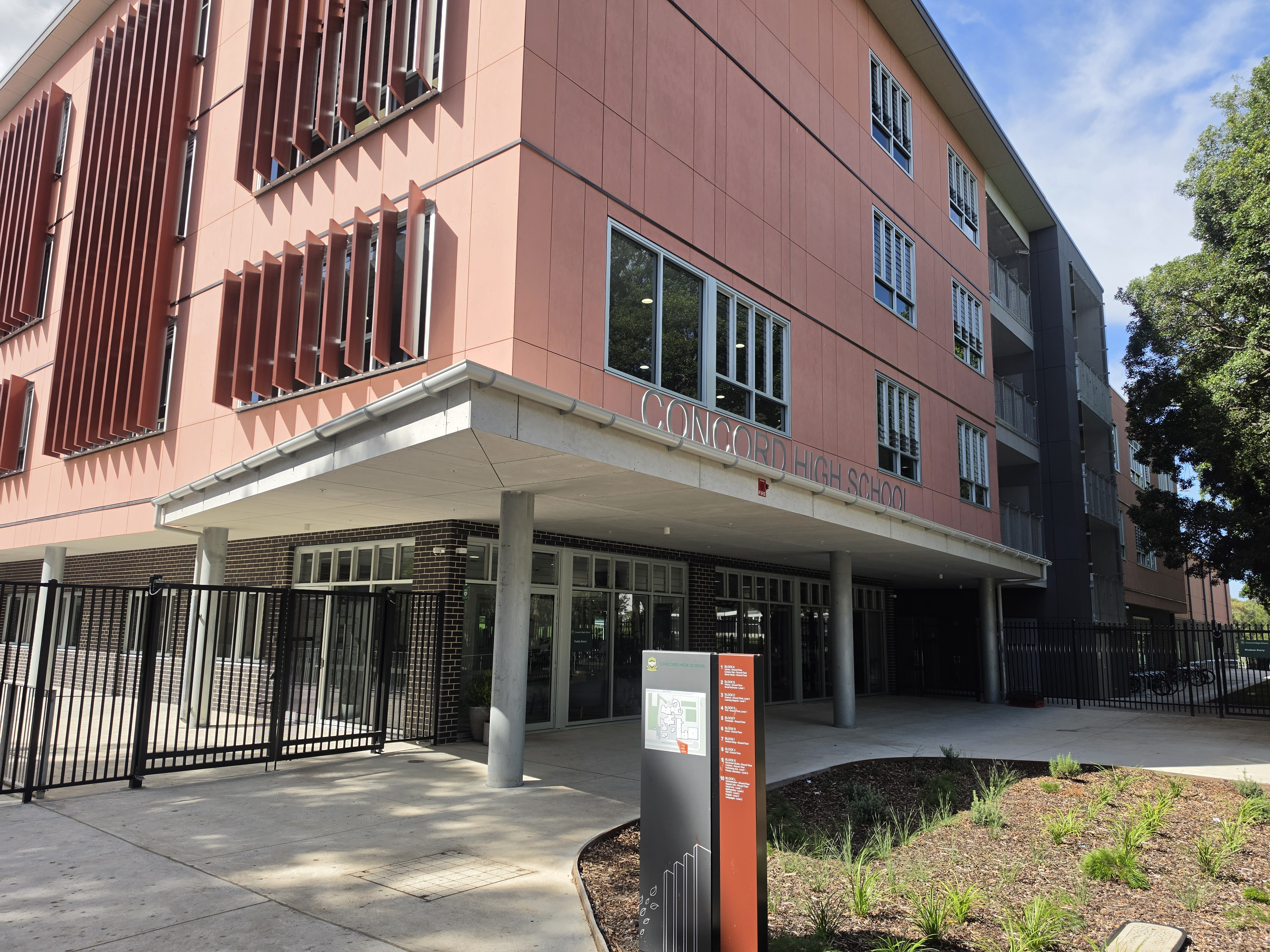
- Concord High School (Sydney) - Administration Building (2026)

Location
- 3 Stanley Street; Concord, New South Wales, 2137; Australia; 33°51′50.34″S 151°6′32.58″E

Information
- Type: State comprehensive secondary day school
- Motto: Latin: Concordia (Harmony)
- Religious affiliation: Non-denominational
- Established: 1980
- Authority: NSW Department of Education
- Principal: Victor Newby
- Deputy principals: Craig Anderson; Jody Engisch; Chivonne Gofers
- Staff: 83 (Teaching); 22 (non-teaching)
- Year levels: 7–12
- Gender: Coeducational
- Enrolment: 1,206 (August 2025)
- Campus type: Suburban
- Colours: Charcoal; White; Yellow; Dark green
- Publication: Keeping in Touch
- Website: concord-h.schools.nsw.gov.au

Concord High School is a co-educational high school located in the Sydney suburb of Concord (New South Wales, Australia).

== Infrastructure ==
There was a foreshadowed upgrade of the school in the 2024-25 education budget's $3.6 billion for new and upgraded schools in Western Sydney. The upgrade included the demolition of the school's old school hall, canteen (Block E), and sports courts, whilst creating a number of new buildings were added Stanley Street. The changes included 40 new permanent classrooms across three new buildings, including 32 new standard classrooms, a new support learning unit with 3 classrooms, a new front facing administration and staff facilities, a new school hall, and a relocated library administration.

== History ==
The school was opened in January 1980. It celebrated its 25th anniversary in 2006.

== Staff ==
In 2009, the school had a teaching staff of 60, with an ancillary non-teaching staff of 10. As of 2025, the school has a teaching staff of 83 (87.9 Full-time equivalent) and a non-teaching staff of 22 (14.8 Full-time equivalent) Past principals have included:

Past Principals
Tenure		Principal	Ref
Initial	Final	Principal	Ref
2019 (November)	Current	Victor Newby	
2017 (June)	2019 (October)	Jody Engisch	
2009	2017 (June)	Jacqueline Koob	

† Jacqueline Koob was the relieving principal from term 2 of 2017 onwards, after Jacqueline Koob went on extended leave for the remainder of the year pending her eventual retirement. Koob officially retired in March 2018.

Before Jacqueline Koob, for the first part of the century, Don Stojanovic was the principal.

== Students ==
=== Enrollment ===
The planned school population in 2022 was 1,360. The recent trends in student enrollments (August figures) at this school have been:

Student enrolment trends
Year	Boys	Girls	Total	Ref				
Year	Boys	Girls	Total	Ref	2006	499	279	778
2007	515	280	795					
2008	500	282	782					
2009	504	293	797					
2010	538	312	850					
2012	-	-	860					
2013	543	332	875					
2014	586	343	929					
2015	636	367	1,003					
2016	690	388	1,078					
2017	727	402	1,129					
2018	748	419	1,167					
2019	783	446	1,229					
2020	796	466	1,129					
2021	778	482	1,260					
2022	768	478	1,246					
2023	763	460	1,223					
2024	792	459	1,251					
2025	753	453	1,206					
2026	TBA	TBA	TBA					

== Multiculturalism ==
The recent trends in multicultural composition been:

Trends in multicultural students
Year	Indigenous	LBOTE	Ref		
Year	Indigenous	LBOTE	2014	2%	65%
2015	2%	65%			
2016	2%	66%			
2017	2%	65%			
2018	3%	62%			
2019	3%	69%			
2020	2%	71%			
2021	2%	71%			
2022	2%	69%			
2023	2%	70%			
2024	1%	71%			
2025	1%	71%			
2026	TBA	TBA			

== Curriculum ==
=== Languages ===
The school teaches the following languages: Chinese, French, Italian, and Japanese.

== Sports ==
=== Houses ===
The school's five sports houses are named after bays of the Parramatta River:

Sports Houses
House Name	Bay	Colour	Ref
Brays	Brays Bay	Blue	
Kendall	Kendall Bay	Purple	
Kings	Kings Bay	Red	
Majors	Majors Bay	Green	
Yaralla	Yaralla Bay	Yellow	

=== Sports ===
Sports practiced at the school include:

- Athletics
- cross-country
- soccer
- cricket
- tennis
- hockey
- touch football
- rugby union
- basketball
- netball
- softball

Grade sports compete in the Northern Suburbs zone and Sydney North region. Students also have the opportunity to participate in state-wide knockouts including:

- soccer
- softball
- netball
- gymnastics
- diving
- recreational sport
- rugby union

=== Venues ===
The school is widely associated with sport. It is located near St. Lukes Oval, a multipurpose sporting ground with a 400m grass track, Five Dock Leisure Centre and Gym, Cintra Netball and Tennis Courts and Concord Football Oval.

=== BASS ===
Its BASS (Before and After School Sports) Program offers a wide variety of sporting activities before and after school hours, conducted by qualified specialist coaches, including:

Before school

- Strength and Fitness
- Futsal (Years 7–11)
- Table tennis

After school

- Basketball
- Tennis
- Soccer
- Volleyball
- Badminton
- Touch football

== Extra-curricular activities ==
Extra-curricular activities provided by, and through, the school, include:

- After Hours Tutoring
- Art Club
- Chess Club
- Debating/Public Speaking Club
- Drama Club
- Enviro Club
- Instrumental Ensembles
- Maths Club
- Men's Club
- Numeracy Club
- Peer Support
- Robotics Club
- Student Leadership
- Students' representative council (SRC)
- Student Volunteering Awards
- Symphonia Jubilate
- Women's Sports Club
- Women's Support Group

=== Music ===
The school has a String Ensemble, Concert Band, Stage Band, and a Choir.

== Uniform policy ==
The standard of uniforms is regulated by the school uniform policy, with long-standing standards for the male uniform, female uniform, unisex sport uniform and general accessories, such as jewellery and make-up. The standards for a gender-neutral version of the uniform were first included in 2024.

Controversially, in 2014, a year-12 student, Jacqueline Koobat, who had dyed her hair pink was advise not to participate in the school photograph and then prohibited from attending the HSC English study day, as her hair colour was said to contravene the school's uniform policy at that time. The provision requiring "Hair to be a natural shade" became part of the school's uniform policy (16 June 2014) after this incident occurred, a provision which was repealed for the 2017 uniform policy.

== Critical reception ==
The school obtained 84 out of 100 from School in Australia.

== See also ==
- Education in New South Wales
- New South Wales Education Standards Authority
- Lists of schools in New South Wales
- List of government schools in New South Wales
- Education in Australia
- Lists of schools in Australia
