= Concord, New South Wales =

Concord
- Suburb
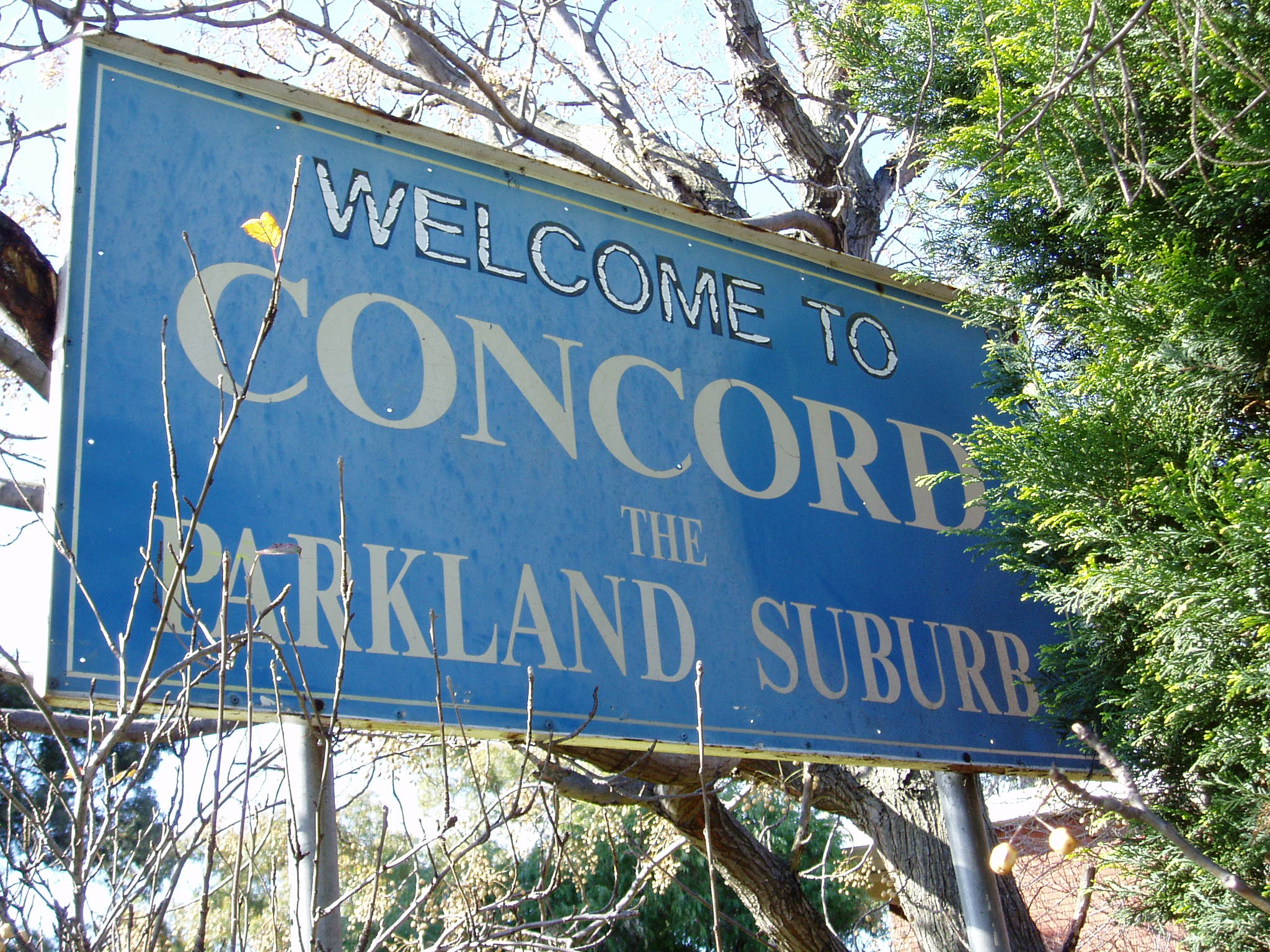
- Sign with the suburb's nickname "The Parkland Suburb"

- Interactive map of Concord
- Country: Australia
- State: New South Wales
- City: Sydney
- LGA: City of Canada Bay
- Location: 10 km (6.2 mi) west of Sydney CBD

Government
  - State electorate: Drummoyne
  - Federal division: Reid
- Elevation: 19 m (62 ft)

Population
  - Total: 14,551 (2021 census)
- Postcode: 2137
Suburbs around Concord
Concord West	Mortlake	Breakfast Point
North Strathfield	Concord	Cabarita
Strathfield	Burwood	Canada Bay

Concord is a suburb in the Inner West of Sydney, in the state of New South Wales, Australia. It is 10 kilometres (6.2 mi) west of the Sydney central business district, in the local government area of the City of Canada Bay. Concord West is a separate suburb, to the north-west.

== History ==
Concord takes its name from Concord, Massachusetts, in the USA, which was the site of the Battle of Concord, one of the first military engagements of the American Revolutionary War (1775–1778). Some historians believe the Sydney suburb was named Concord to encourage a peaceful attitude between soldiers and settlers. The first land grants in the area were made in 1793.

The original Concord Council was established in 1883. Concord Council amalgamated with Drummoyne Council in 2000, after 117 years of self governance to form the City of Canada Bay. It is also the name of the surrounding parish.

In 1933, 'Concord Jubilee 1833–1933: a history of the municipality of Concord: with illustrations', compiled by G. M. Shaw was published.

== Commercial area ==
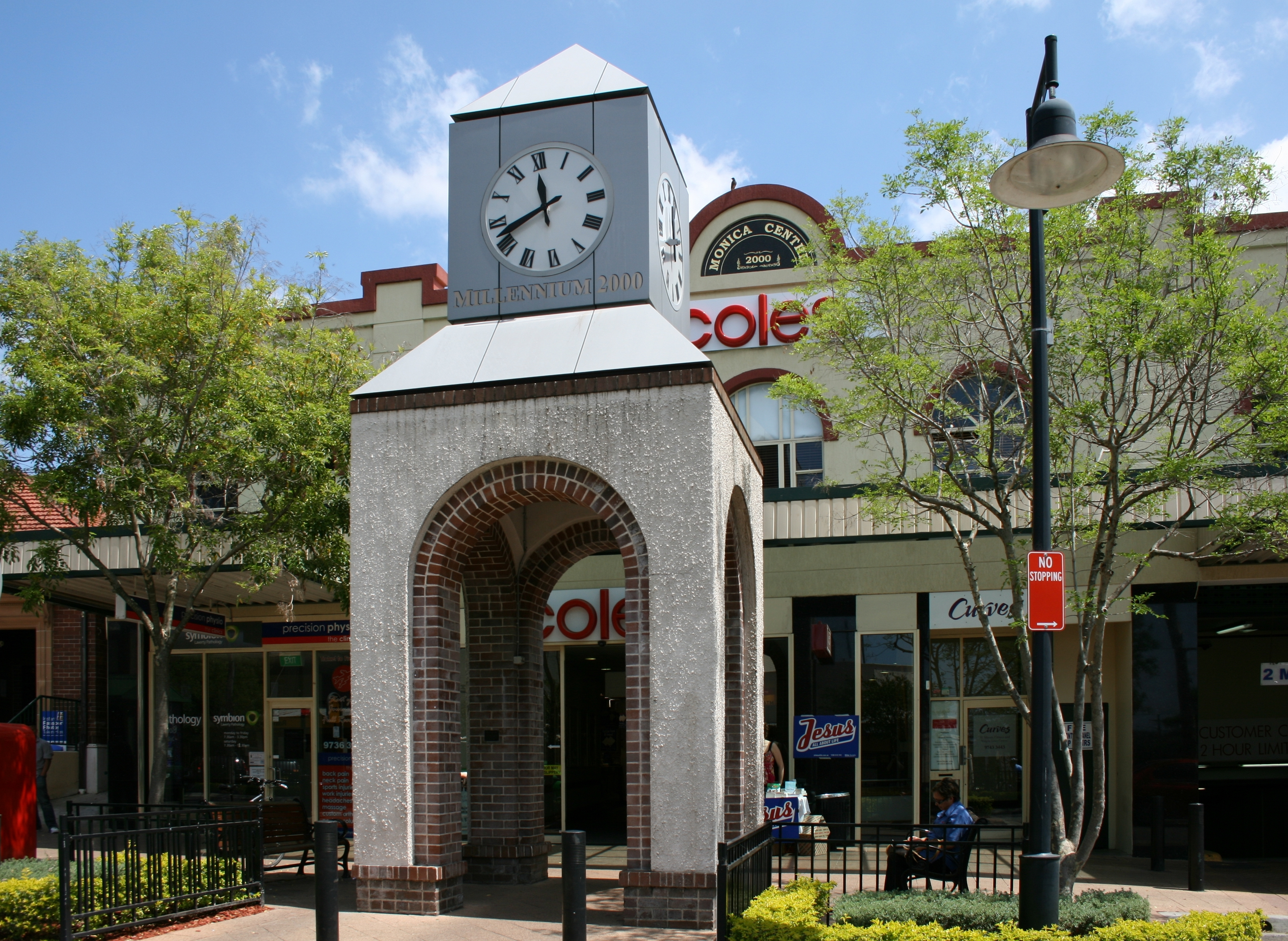
Clocktower entrance to the "Monica Centre" shopping arcade on Majors Bay Road, has since been renovated to include a Coles Local artesian supermarket

Concord features Majors Bay Road Shopping Village. It includes several cafes, restaurants, Coles Local, post office, medical centre and other commercial enterprises. There is also a small shopping strip on Cabarita Road in the locality of Cabarita Junction on the road towards Breakfast Point, including a small cafe and restaurant precinct on the corner of Mortlake Street and Brays Road.

== Churches ==
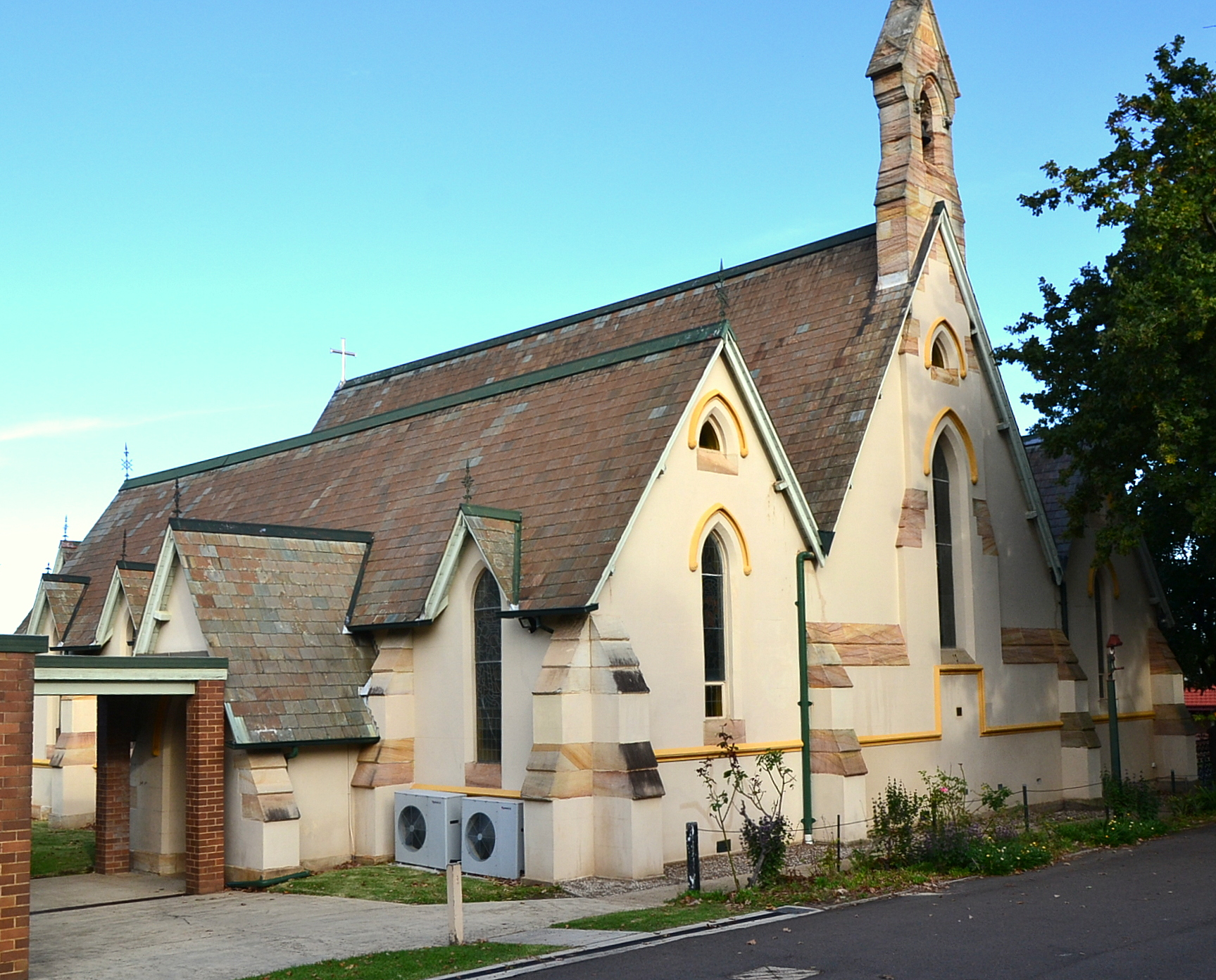
St Lukes Anglican Church

St Luke's Anglican Church is one of the oldest churches in Concord. The church is over 150 years old and is located at Burton Street near Concord Oval. Its current organ was donated by Dame Eadith Walker, of the famous Walker family on her 21st birthday in 1883.

St Mary's Catholic Church is a prominent architectural landmark on Parramatta Road. The first church on the site was built in 1845 until a new church was built in 1874. A school operated in the original church building until a separate school building was built and opened by Cardinal Moran in 1894. A convent for the Sisters of Charity was erected next to the church in 1898. The present church building was completed in 1929.

== Parks ==
Concord has many parks, including:

- Queen Elizabeth Park (formerly known as 'Concord Park', renamed to honour Queen Elizabeth II after her visit to Australia in 1954)
- Henley Park (site of the former general cemetery – 1938)
- Majors Bay Reserve, including Arthur Walker and Ron Routly Reserves (beginning of the Concord Foreshore Trail).
- Concord Golf Course, Massey Park, Cintra Park
- Concord Oval (home ground of Inter Lions Soccer Club and the West Harbour Pirates Rugby Union Club, training ground of Wests Tigers NRL club)
- Sid Richards Park (home ground of the Concord Comets Baseball Club)
- Central Park, St Lukes Park, Bayview Park, Edwards Park, Greenlees Park, Goddard Park, Rothwell Park.

== Transport ==
Transit Systems operate 6 routes via Concord:

- 410: Hurstville via Campsie, Burwood and Ryde to Marsfield
- 458: Burwood station to Ryde
- 464: Mortlake to Ashfield station
- 466: Cabarita Park to Burwood station via Bayview Park
- 502: Cabarita to the City via Victoria Road
- 526: One weekday service from Concord High School to Olympic Park wharf via Burwood & Strathfield

Concord West railway station and North Strathfield railway station service the Concord area. The stops are on the Northern line approximately 14 km (9 miles) from Central Station.

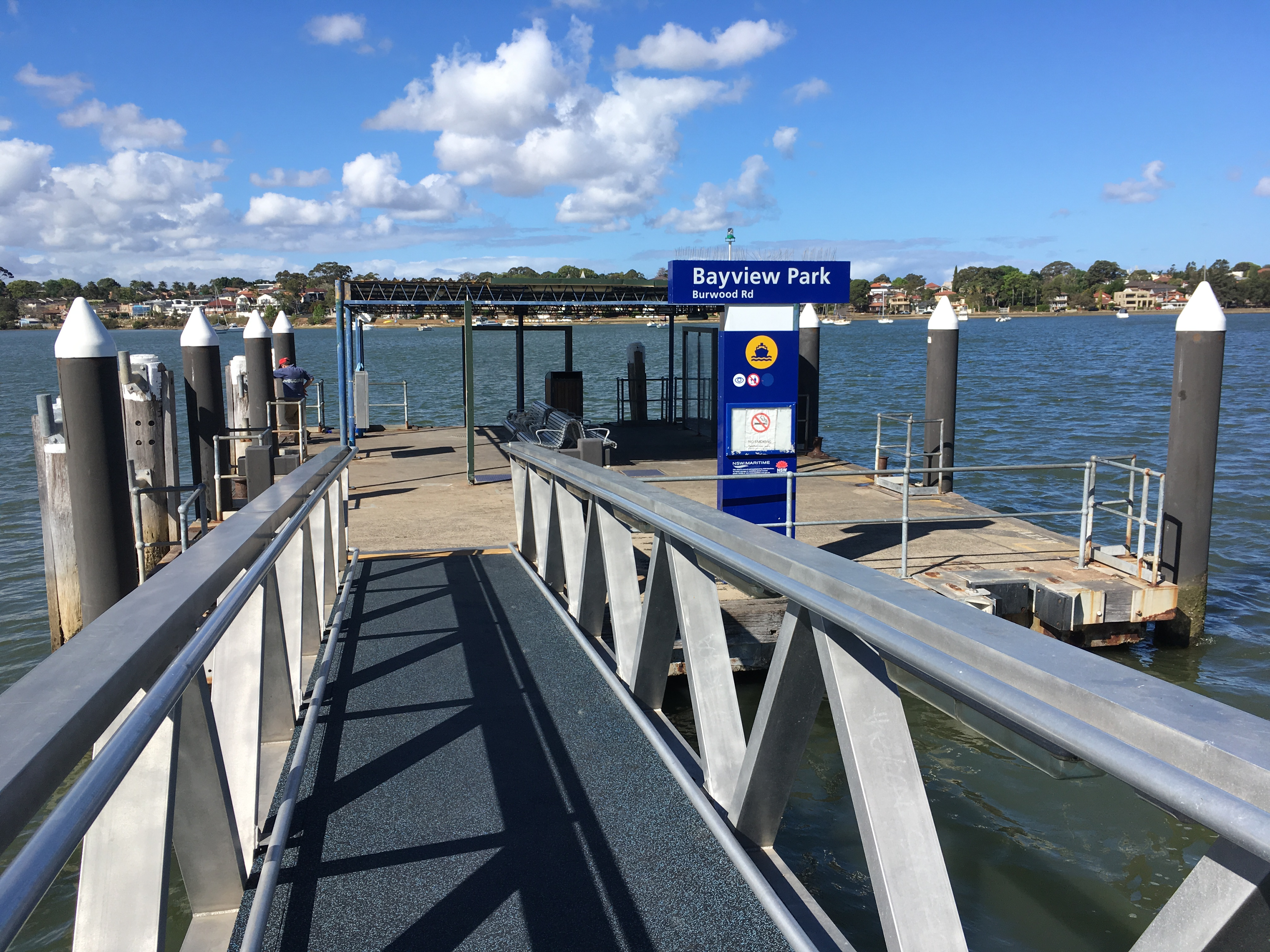
Bayview Park ferry wharf

Sydney Ferries service the Concord area stopping at Cabarita Wharf.

Historically (1901-1948), Concord was also served by a tram line, which connected Mortlake and Cabarita junction, through Majors Bay Road in Concord, to Burwood Road (formerly Wharf Street on the Concord side of Parramatta Road) south to Burwood town centre. From here, the tram line proceeded through Enfield to a depot in resent-day Croydon Park, in Tangarra Street, then east to Ashfield station. The original part of this tram line was built in 1891, from Ashfield to Enfield, and it was extended north to Mortlake in 1901, and a branch to Cabarita Park was built in 1909. The system was electrified in 1912. The line was never connected to any of the other tram lines in Sydney, although its eastern terminus, at Ashfield station, was only one station away (on the main suburban railway line) from the nearest tram terminus at Summer Hill station.

Bus services between Mortlake/Breakfast Point and Cabarita to Burwood (and eventually to Ashfield via Enfield, i.e. routes 464 and 466) follow the old tram lines through the suburb, which were removed in 1948. Few hints of Concord's trams remain today apart from the extra width of Majors Bay Road and Brewer Street in order to accommodate a double track tramway and the existence of Tramway Lane and Cabarita Junction which is where the tram tracks split, with one track providing the Mortlake branch and the other the Cabarita branch.

== Schools ==
Schools in the suburb are

- Concord Public School
- Concord High School
- St Mary's Primary School
- Mortlake Public School

== Population ==
=== Demographics ===
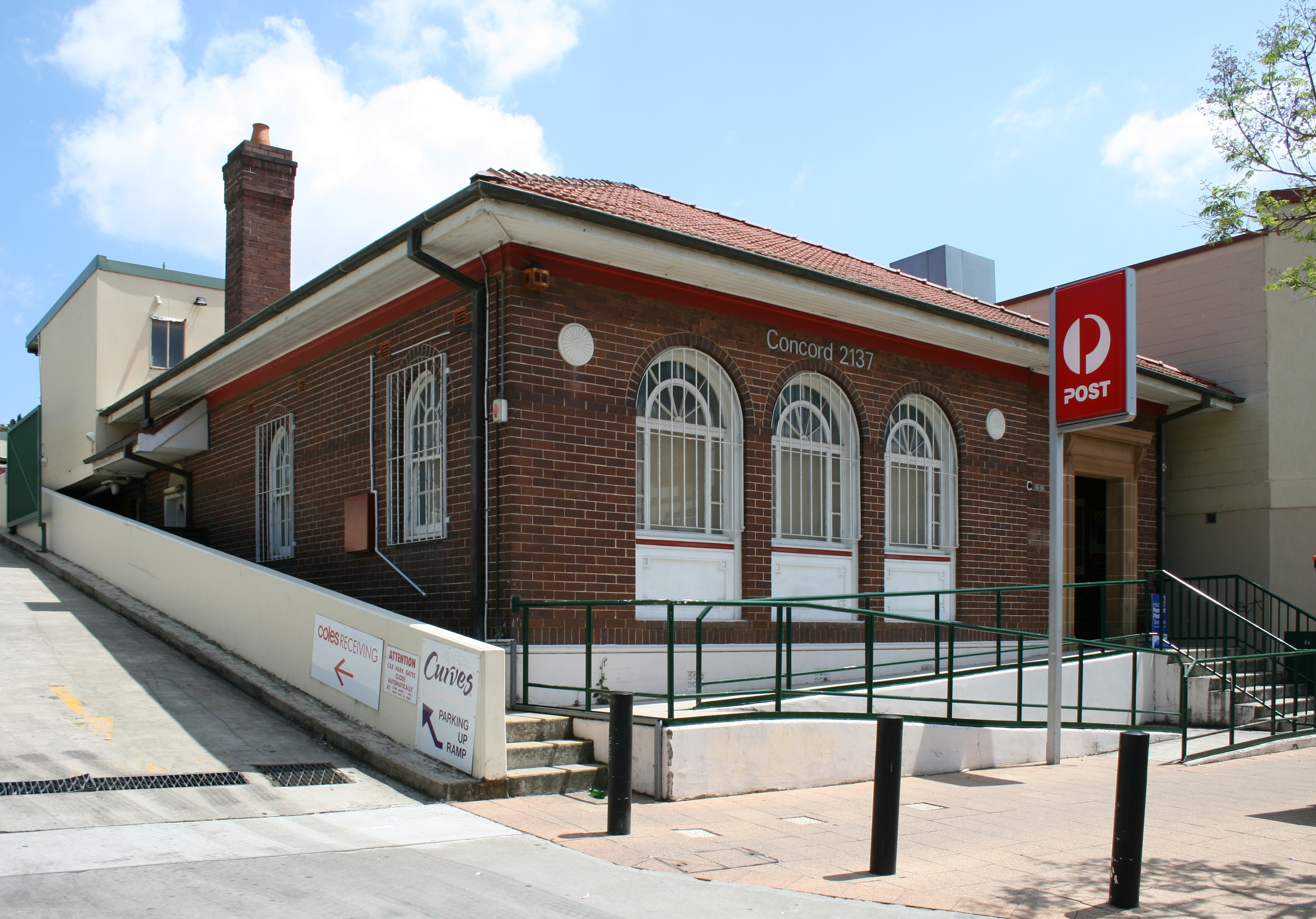
Concord Post Office

At the 2021 census, there were 14,551 residents in Concord. The most commonly reported ancestries were Italian (22.2%), Australian (18.5%), English (17.5%), Chinese (13.2%) and Irish (8.1%). 63.9% of residents were born in Australia. The most common other countries of birth were Italy 5.8%, China 5.4%, England 1.9%, South Korea 1.5% and Lebanon 1.4%. In Concord 59.9% of people only spoke English at home, compared to the national average of 72.0%. Other languages spoken at home included Italian 9.2%, Mandarin 6.1%, Arabic 3.6%, Cantonese 3.6% and Greek 3.1%. The most common responses for religion in Concord were Catholic 45.4%, No Religion 23.5%, Anglican 6.4% and Eastern Orthodox 6.1%.

=== Notable residents ===
Notable people who have resided in the suburb have included:

- Neil Armfield (born 1955) – Theatre, film and opera director, grew up in Sanders Parade opposite Exile Bay
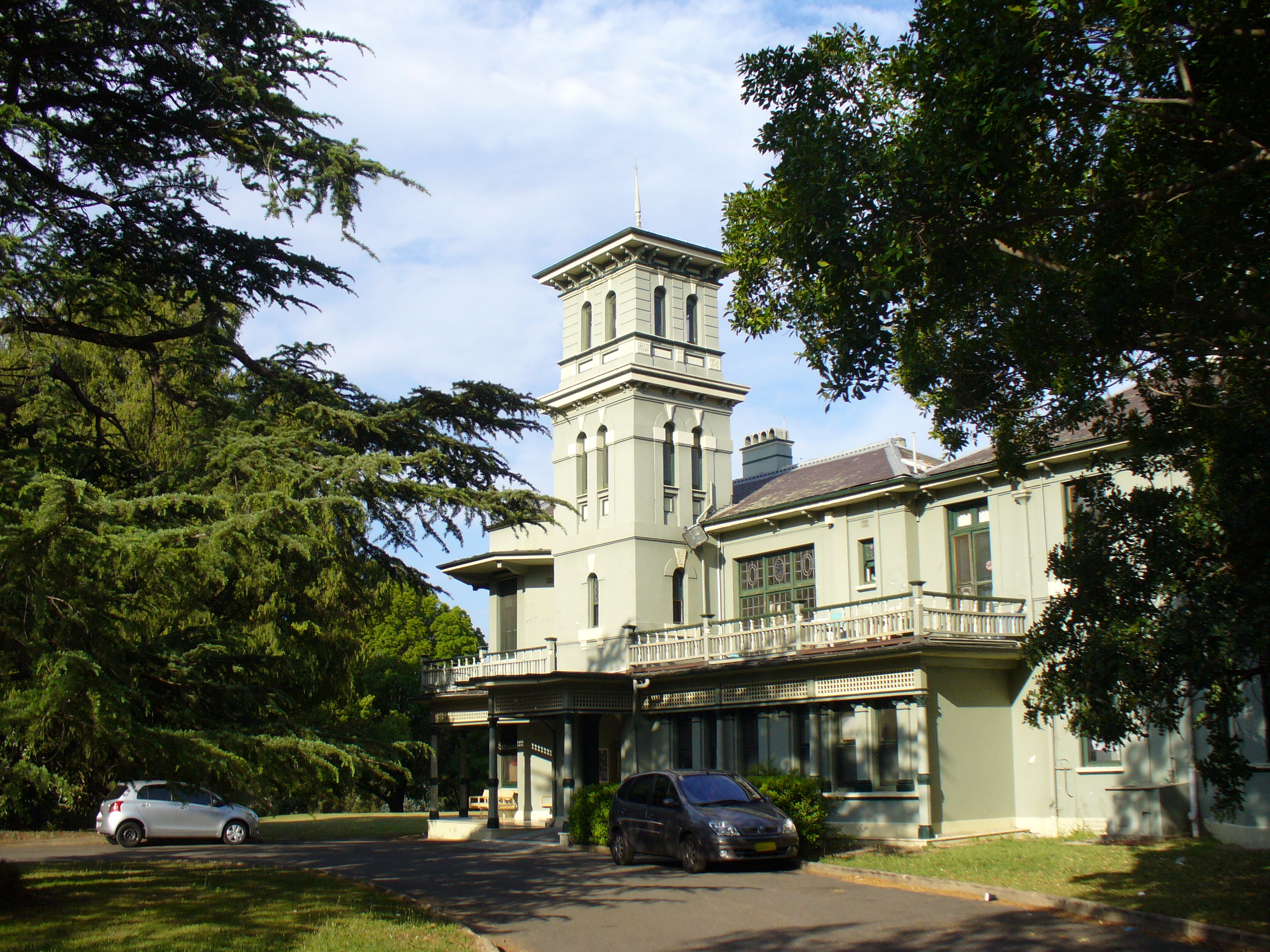
  Yaralla Mansion in Concord, originally home of Dame Eadith Walker, is now a convalescent hospital
- Hiram Caton (1936–2010) – Professor of politics and history at Griffith University, Brisbane, Australia
- Selwyn Edge (1868–1940) – businessman, racing driver, and record-breaker. He is principally associated with selling and racing De Dion-Bouton, Gladiator, AC Cars, Clément-Panhard and Napier cars
- Michael Kirby (born 1939) – jurist and judge of the High Court of Australia, lived on Sydney Street
- Charles Francis Laseron (1887–1959), naturalist and malacologist
- Peter Luck (1944–2017) – author, television host, and producer
- Isaac Nichols (1770–1819) – Australia Post's first postmaster and original owner of Walker Estate
- Mervyn Victor Richardson (1893–1972) – inventor of the Victa lawn mower
- Thomas Walker (1804–1886) – Australian politician, banker, prominent land owner in Concord, and father of Dame Eadith Campbell Walker. Walker built the Italianate mansion Yaralla in the 1860s. It was extended in the 1890s by John Sulman and is now used as the Dame Eadith Walker Convalescent Hospital. It is listed on the Register of the National Estate. Thomas Walker Convalescent Hospital was built in fulfilment of Walker's will. It too was designed by John Sulman and is on the Register of the National Estate
- Dame Eadith Walker (1861–1937) – Australian philanthropist and major land owner in Concord for much of the late 19th and early 20th Century who aided in establishing Concord Repatriation General Hospital
- Phillip Wilcher (born 1955) – Australian classical pianist and composer, also one of the original members of The Wiggles
- Ellen Redchester/ Fraser (1764-1840) First Fleet convict and mother of the second child of European parentage to be born in the colony. First woman to own feehold land in the colony.

== Popular culture ==
- Australian drama series All Saints, is set in the fictional All Saints General Western Hospital. The external shots (the sweeping shots of the skyline and hospital) are filmed at the Concord Repatriation General Hospital. Some scenes have been shot in and around Concord and Majors Bay Road.
- Australian series Grass Roots was set in the fictional suburb of Arcadia Waters. Many external shots of Arcadia waters Council chambers used Concord Council Chambers as a setting and as was other various locations around Concord, particularly in the shopping centre and cafes in Majors Bay Road.
- Australian mini series Bangkok Hilton was partly filmed in the grounds of the Thomas Walker Convalescent Hospital.
- Australian drama/comedy series Packed to the Rafters is partly filmed in Riverview Street, and other locations within Concord, where the Rafter family home is located.
- Dirty Deeds a 2002 Australian/Canadian production filmed in Concord, utilising Henley park and a nearby 1960s period home for the setting.
- Brides of Christ a 1991 miniseries used St Marys Catholic Church Concord for some of the internal Church Mass scenes.
- The Cut a 2009 comedy/drama series was partly filmed in Concord, with some internal filming done in a Majors Bay Road shop and some external filming done on the Majors Bay Road shopping strip and Concord Oval.
- The Victa Mower was created by Mervyn "Victor" Richardson in a Concord garage in 1952.
- Scenes from action movie Superman Returns were shot at Rivendell Hospital, which was Lex Luther's mansion.
- Scenes from the drama series Rake were shot in Concord.
- Scenes from the 2013 miniseries Carlotta were shot in Concord.

== See also ==
- City of Canada Bay Museum
