= Thomas Walker Convalescent Hospital Buildings =

Thomas Walker Convalescent Hospital
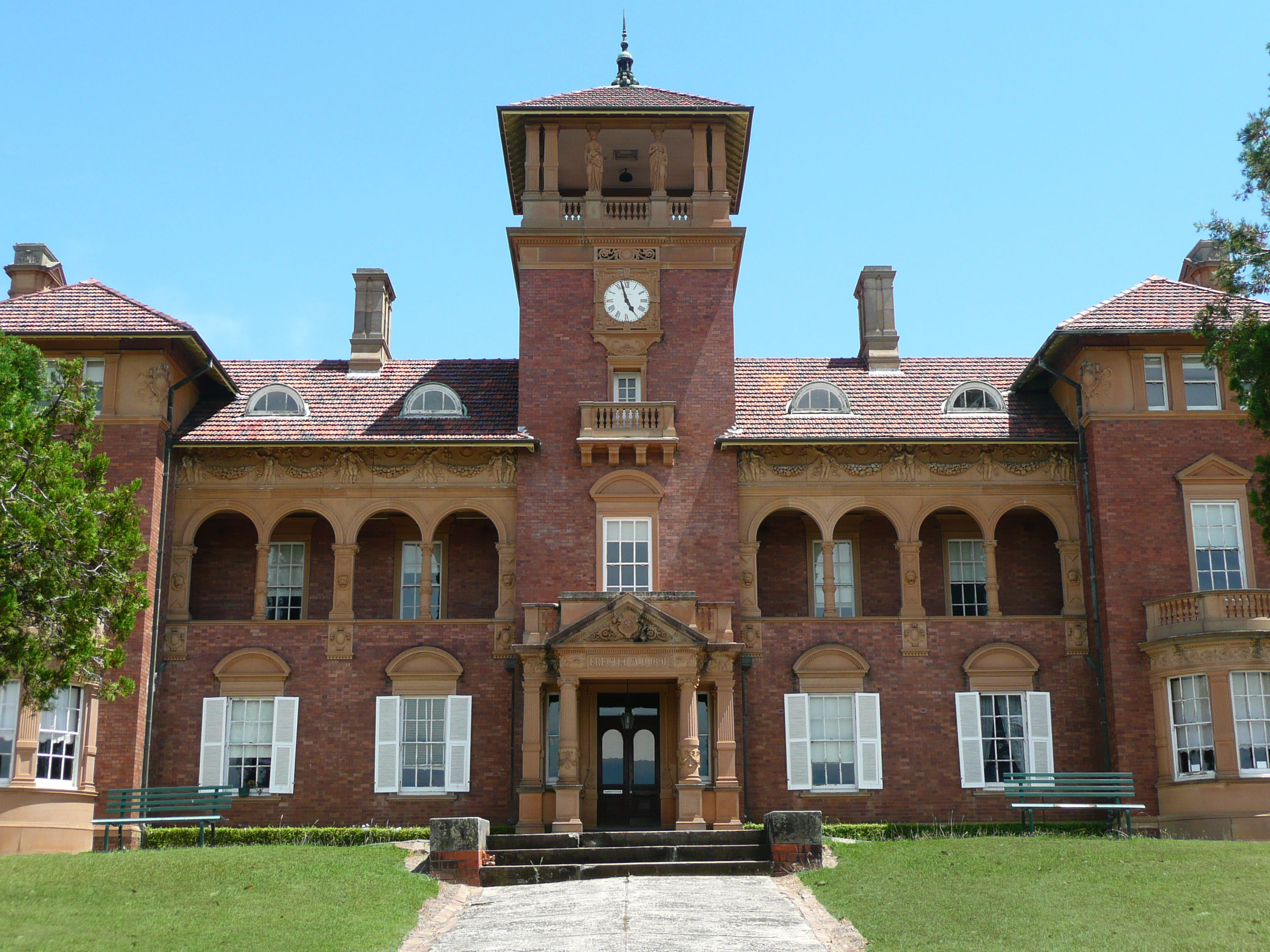

- Location within New South Wales
- 33.8328°S 151.0969°E
- Location: Hospital Road, Concord West, City of Canada Bay, New South Wales, Australia

History
- Built: 1890–1893

Site notes
- Architect(s): Sir John Sulman; gardens possibly by the office of/Sir John Sulman
- Owner: NSW Department of Health

New South Wales Heritage Register
- Official name: Thomas Walker Convalescent Hospital; Rivendell Adolescent Unit; Rivendell; Joanna Walker Convalescent Hospital
- Type: state heritage (complex / group)
- Designated: 2 April 1999
- Reference no.: 115
- Type: Psychiatric hospital/Mental institute/Asylum
- Category: Health Services
- Builders: Alexander M Allen

The Thomas Walker Convalescent Hospital Buildings are a heritage-listed complex which formed the former Thomas Walker Convalescent Hospital, located at Hospital Road, Concord West, City of Canada Bay, New South Wales, Australia. The site is now used for the Rivendell Child, Adolescent and Family Unit. The buildings were designed by Sir John Sulman and built from 1890 to 1893 by Alexander M. Allen. It includes the former Joanna Walker Convalescent Hospital. The property is owned by the New South Wales Department of Health. It was added to the New South Wales State Heritage Register on 2 April 1999.

== History ==
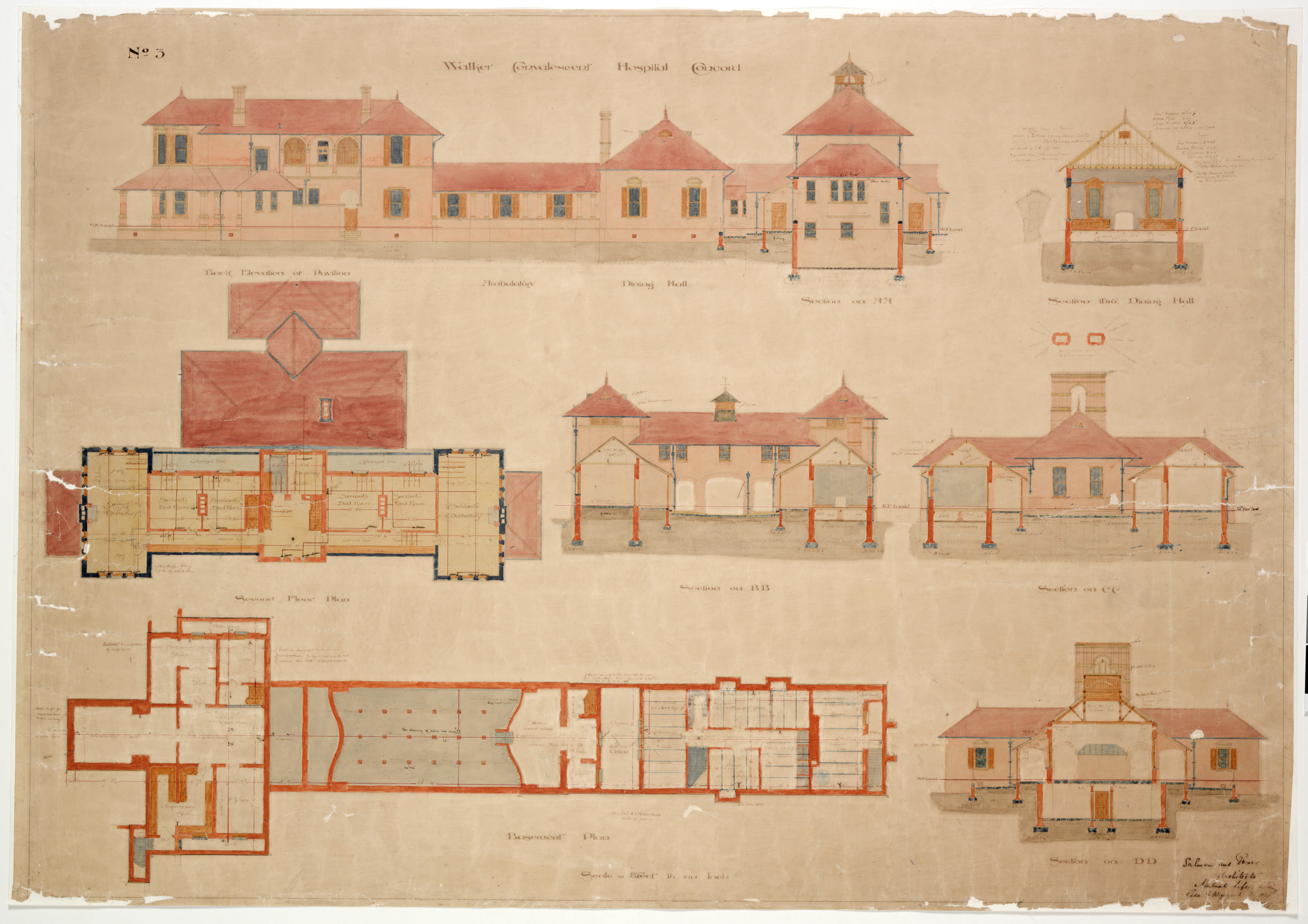
Thomas Walker Convalescent Hospital architectural plan, 1890-1893

The original Thomas Walker estate at Concord was an area of 390 acres. The establishment of the Thomas Walker Convalescent Hospital was initiated by a £100,000 bequest in the will of Thomas Walker, who died in 1886. He was a philanthropist, at various times a member of the New South Wales Legislative Council, President and Director of the Bank of New South Wales, a magistrate and a prominent man of commerce.

Walker resided at Yaralla Estate at Concord, later to become known as the Dame Eadith Walker Estate, home to the Dame Eadith Walker Convalescent Hospital, located on the next peninsula east of today's Rivendell. He requested in his will that a portion of the Estate, known as Rocky Point be set aside for the building of the Hospital. This would fulfil a desire he had been harbouring for some time during his life but had been unable to fulfil due to other pressures.

To fulfil Walker's wishes, the executors of the will Joanna Walker, Thomas Walker's sister, A. Consett Stephens and A. J. Mackenzie announced a competition in April 1888 for the design of a convalescent hospital on Rocky Point. Judges were Thomas Buckland, Thomas Rowe and a qualified physician. The winning design was John Kirkpatrick.

The reasons for Sulman becoming Architect are not clear. However, Kirkpatrick's scheme was criticised as being too expensive and in mid-1889 it was announced that although Kirkpatrick's design was to be built, the architectural commission had been given to Messrs Sulman and Power. This led to further criticism.

John Sulman had also been engaged as a consultant during the competition and had been acting as an advisor to one of the Trustees. A new plan was recommended combining features of several of the competition designs, but the Trustees were under no obligation to appoint the competition winner as architect. This may help to explain his appointment.

Tenders were called for the building of the hospital in August 1889. In December Alexander M. Allen was accepted with a quote of £65,189. Work was then sub-contracted out. The final cost of the hospital was £150,000, the extra £50,000 being contributed by Eadith Walker, Joanna Walker and Anne Sulman, Eadith's childhood companion.

Gas was supplied to the convalescent home in 1892 from the new Australian Gaslight's company at Mortlake. The opportunity was taken to lay mains to supply Yaralla and its grounds as well.

The hospital was opened on 21 September 1893 and was used for convalescence until World War II. No infectious or terminal cases were admitted to the hospital and all patients were referred by doctors from hospitals such as Royal Prince Alfred Hospital, St Vincent's Hospital, Sydney Hospital, Concord Repatriation General Hospital and Burwood hospital. The patients were not charged for their care, Walker's endowment providing for four week stays with a provision for a stay of two months if necessary.

In 1894 the Joanna Walker Memorial Children's Convalescent Hospital was opened in the hospital grounds. It was also designed by John Sulman. The hospital was adjacent to the main building and contained places for 12 children with an airy central courtyard.

Mr J. Upton senior was in charge of the Thomas Walker Convalescent Hospital's grounds for 16 years, a position he resigned to take up the business of carnation growing. Upton Sen was a member of the Horticultural Society of NSW for 34 years. He was a very successful exhibitor of roses and chrysanthemums when in charge of the gardens of the late J. C. Smith and the late James Toohey, MLA of Strathfield. Upton Sen was born in England and received his training from experienced head gardeners near Birmingham and was last employed at Perry Hall, South Staffordshire. He arrived in Australia in 1887.

In 1897 were the last round of renovations.

In 1920 there was a major subdivision of the Walker estate between Concord Road and the gates of the Dame Eadith Walker Estate (Yaralla), forming much of today's Concord West suburb.

In February 1943 the military took possession of the hospital under regulation 54 of the National Security (General) Regulations Act. The use of the hospital for convalescence was discontinued and was run by the Australian Red Cross as the 3rd Australian Women's Hospital until March/April 1946. The Perpetual Trustees regained control of the estate in 1946 and the hospital was again used for public convalescence. In the intervening years, increased affluence and general living standards, the establishment of a broad range of government-funded social welfare provisions and the development of antibiotics meant that many debilitating illnesses such as scarlet fever and tuberculosis were virtually eliminated or at least rendered innocuous. The demand for the facilities offered by the hospital declined from the 1950s. By the 1970s increasing costs combined with declining need rendered continued use of the hospital as a free convalescent hospital impracticable.

In 1976 the Trustees decided that the use of the site as a convalescent hospital was no longer a viable proposition and entrusted it to the NSW Health Commission on the condition that it be used as closely as possible to Thomas Walker's intentions.

Administration of the site was given to Royal Prince Alfred Hospital who used it for seven years as Rivendell Adolescent Unit, a rehabilitation centre for emotionally disturbed adolescents set up c. 1977. The Joanna Walker Memorial Children's Convalescent Hospital was taken over by the Concord Historical Society in 1972, though later returned to the health service. In the 1980s the hospital was administered by the Health Commission of NSW on the condition that it should keep as closely as possible to the convalescent ideal embodied in the will of Thomas Walker. Rivendell, now administered by the Central Sydney Area Health Service, combines therapy, counselling and school classes for teenagers who board at the centre through the school week, returning to their families at weekends.

== Description ==
The Thomas Walker Convalescent Hospital is situated on the Parramatta River bounded by Brays Bay and Yaralla Bay. It is a large complex on a large park-like riverside estate, with extensive and prominent landscape plantings, making it a landmark along the river.

=== Grounds ===
An extensive garden principally of trees and lawn, unaltered in layout and adequately maintained, but in need of more careful and sympathetic replanting respecting the strict symmetry of its design. A symmetrical design of sweeping brick edged paths, drives, lawns and specimen planting around a symmetrically planned institution and having considerable frontage to the Parramatta River.

A central entrance drive (with borders replanted c. 1981), leads to a turning circle planted with an Araucaria pine from which drives lead off on either side to encircle the building.

On the river side a central path bordered with Thujas, and palms (jelly palm, Butia capitata); many now removed), slopes from the hospital to its "water gate". The water gate is flanked by a symmetrical pair of Cook's pines, (Araucaria columnaris). Further drives extend from the water gate along the shore and then curve up to the extremities of the hospital's wings, enclosing areas of lawn on either side of the central path planted symmetrically with pines, Araucarias, figs etc. Two enclosed grassed, colonnaded courtyards with fountains (replanted c. 1981).

Within the grounds are extensive gardens and subsidiary outbuildings including stables, a gatehouse, the Joanna Walker Memorial Convalescent Children's Cottage Hospital and a wharf, including a two storey brick entry building flanked by two towering Cook's pines, (Araucaria columnaris). These buildings are compatible with the style of the main complex.

Plantings near the main complex feature mature Cook's pines (Araucaria columnaris) including a pair flanking a riverside wharf entry building, a collection of palms including Canary Island palms (Phoenix canariensis), P. Reclinata, coral trees (Erythrina indica) and others.

Plantings as of 1 July 2004 included:

- North of the main building: Bunya pine (Araucaria bidwillii), Cooks pine (Araucaria columnaris), brush box, (Lophostemon confertus), Bhutan cypresses, (Cupressus torulosa), Mediterranean cypress (Cupressus sempervirens), Cocos Island/queen palms (Syagrus romanzoffiana), azaleas, Rhododendron indicum cv.s around bases of buildings, box elders (Acer negundo), Norfolk Island pines, Araucaria heterophylla, Canary Island date palms (Phoenix canariensis), jacarandas (Jacaranda mimosifolia), turpentines (Syncarpia glomulifera), camphor laurels (Cinnamomum camphora), Qld. Kauri (Agathis robusta) (pair of, near river), kaffir plum (Harpephyllum afrum), NZ christmas tree/pohutukawa (Metrosideros excelsa), carob (Ceratonia siliqua), Aleppo pine (Pinus halepensis), coral tree (Erythrina sp. (probably E.x sykesii)) (near water gate), port wine magnolia (Michelia figo) (against west wing), Chinese rose (Hibiscus rosa-sinensis cv.) (against west wing) and Camellia sasanqua cv.
- West of the main building: giant golden striped bamboo (Bambusa sp.), funeral cypress (Cupressus funebris), Mexican pine (Pinus patula), firewheel tree (Stenocarpus sinuatus), giant lily pilly (Waterhousea floribunda), umbrella tree (Heptapleurum actinophyllum), Himalayan cedars (Cedrus deodara), Qld. black bean (Castanospermum australe)
- On drive to south (of main building): red oak (Quercus coccinea), lily pilly (Acmena smithii), brush box (Lophostemon confertus), orchid/butterfly tree (Bauhinia variegata), African olive (hedge) (Olea europaea var. africana), cocks comb coral tree (Erythrina crista-galli), apple blossom (Abelia grandiflora), Cape/Jameson daisy (Gerbera jamesonii cv.s), Cotoneaster sp., Sacred/heavenly bamboo (Nandina domestica)
- On the drive: oleander (Nerium oleander cv.s), bottlebrush (Callistemon sp/cv.s), either Chir/Himalayan pine (Pinus roxburghii) or Canary Island pine (Pinus canariensis), evergreen magnolia/bull bay (Magnolia grandiflora (2 on either side of north wing), Cocos Island/queen palms (Syagrus romanzoffiana) (several)
- On the avenue to water gate: Jelly palms (Butia capitata), Phoenix reclinata, Chamaecyparis lawsoniana cv., NSW christmas bush (Ceratopetalum gummiferum), Camellia japonica cvs., Hill's figs (Ficus microcarpa var. Hillii), Himalayan cedars (Cedrus deodara), silky oaks (Grevillea robusta)
- Courtyard plantings: tree ferns (Cyathea sp.), Gordonia axillaris (2), frangipani (Plumeria rubra cv.s)

=== Buildings ===
==== Main Complex ====
The main Thomas Walker Hospital complex is of Federation style based on a pavilion format. Each pavilion is planned to retain its functional integrity with the central block for administration and service wings on each side.

The two-storeyed central block includes an intricately detailed three storeyed tower over the main entrance, an impressive vestibule and an entertainment hall for 300 people. Sandstone wood panelling is found internally and externally. The hospital comprises eight main buildings:-

An extensive complex housed in a single symmetrical building of two storeys with an attic level. The main section overlooks the Parramatta River. There is a large central clock tower, flanked by smaller matching towers. Other sections, mostly two storeys are connected by a single storey Recreation Hall. Either side are residential quarters about cloisters, at rear are kitchens and two dining rooms.

=== Other items within the group of State Significance ===
- Joanna Walker Convalescent Hospital - A small single storey building of Queen Anne style designed to complement the main building. Features include decorative stonework a timber rear verandah and a central courtyard. The building is brick with a terracotta tile roof.
- Administration Wing - Basement, ground, first and second floor and a clock tower.
- Recreation Hall - Partial Basement and main hall with gallery, raised stage and apse.
- Dormitory Wing (Pavilion) - Ground and first floor.
- School Wing (Pavilion) - Ground and first floor.
- Two Dining Rooms - Each with one level only.
- Kitchen - A basement and ground floor
- Service Building - A ground floor and partial second floor.

These eight buildings are interconnected by single level covered walkways.

All buildings are of a similar construction.

Building features:

- External walls - Masonry (clay brick with sandstone portals, piers, cornices and friezes.)
- Internal walls - Generally masonry with some later additions of timber partitions.
- Floors - Generally of timber construction with some wet areas having lightweight concrete (coke breeze) supported by unprotected steel members. Floor coverings include carpet and linoleum in the majority of areas.
- Roofs - Timber framed with terracotta tiling to the majority of areas with some metal roofing to the first floor corridors of the Administration Wing.
- Ceilings - Set plaster under floor and ceiling joists.
- Internal doors - Generally framed and panelled timber with some having glass panels and others having glazed transoms. The original transom glazing in the dormitory has been replaced with wired glass.

=== Modifications and dates ===
- 1893-94 - Joanna Walker Memorial Children's Hospital built.
- 1900 - Stables built.
- 1915 - Cottage built.
- Just prior to 1939 the Commonwealth Government acquired the land on which the main complex is situated.
- c. 1981 Central entrance drive borders replanted; Two enclosed grassed, colonnaded courtyards with fountains replanted
- 1976+ - the hospital houses the Central Sydney Area Health Service's adolescent psychiatric unit, Rivendell.
- By 1986, when Knox & Tanner had conducted their study of the grounds, minor paths had disappeared, the carriage loop on the front slope was covered with grass and all of the productive functions of the landscape had ceased. Several specimen plantings had been added, particularly in the area of the Joanna Walker Memorial Children's Cottage and on the west side of the main building.
- 1993: An extensive garden principally of trees and lawn, unaltered in layout and adequately maintained, but in need of more careful and sympathetic replanting respecting the strict symmetry of its design. On the river side a central path bordered with Thujas, and palms (jelly palm, Butia capitata); many now removed), slopes from the hospital to its "water gate".
- 2008-11: Carpark in south-eastern corner (servicing adjacent Concord Hospital complex):
  - The arborist recommended the removal of the stringybark tree, which has been undertaken by SSWAHS.
  - The arborist report also recommended the removal of asphalt from around all four sides of tree trunks in S2 car park. "Asphalt removed 0.3 metres two sides and 1.0 metre remaining two sides and soil cultivated to loosen compacted soil in April 2008." This work has been completed. Pine buffers have been installed at this perimeter to prevent damage to the tree base by cars. The trees within the car park have been slow to recover, however there is evidence of new growth in all but one of the trees within this area. Concerns were also raised regarding possible damage to the Stables and Mortuary buildings on the Thomas Walker Estate from runoff from the car park. In order to mitigate runoff, drainage has been installed along the northern perimeter of the car park. The drains now lead to two pits located adjacent to the Stables building.

Since the sealing of the car park, Sydney Local Health Network has developed a restoration plan for several buildings on the Thomas Walker site. These include:

- Repair to the main entrance brick wall
- Repair to the Stables
- Repairs to the mortuary
- Repairs to the gate house and main gates
- Repairs to the sandstone facade of the main building

== Heritage listing ==
The Thomas Walker Convalescent Hospital is of national heritage significance as a rare major institution which has survived along the foreshores of the Parramatta River from the 19th century. Along with Carrington Centennial Hospital, the Thomas Walker Convalescent Hospital is the only other convalescent hospital to have survived from the 19th century.

The recreation hall/chapel which is located in the main administration building of the hospital is a rare example of an intact recreational hall/chapel forming part of a hospital complex.

The hospital is important because it reflects Florence Nightingale's influence on 19th century convalescent hospital design principles and their adoption into Australian architecture. It also reflects the influence of Australian hospital administrators and American publications on its design.

The Estate is a rare surviving late 19th century major institution of a private architect's design in Australia and is John Sulman's finest work in this country. It features a large number of Italianate motifs and decorative elements which reflect Sulman's first hand experience of Italian architecture as a result of his continental travels. Additionally the buildings reflect Sulman's use of advanced building science concepts including one of the first known uses of "cavity walls" (or hollow walls) to insulate interiors against harsh summer sun rays.

The hospital embodies the late 19th century concept of competition designs for the creation of major institutions. It is important for its social links with women in allowing them to pursue career opportunities.

The grounds of the hospital are of national heritage significance as an intact example of Victorian/Edwardian institutional gardens which have maintained an institution throughout their whole existence. They are a bold, effective piece of institutional gardening, integral with an architecturally exceptionally important late 19th century hospital building and probably designed by its architect, Sir John Sulman. The grounds are of aesthetic value as an important landscape feature on the shore of the Parramatta River. The grounds are featured by elements of high architectural quality such as the Watergate, which is an extremely rare building type in Australia (no other examples have been found to date), and the Landgate, which is probably the most elaborate building type of its kind to have survived in Australia from the 19th century. Other important garden elements of note are the axial driveway and the paths, edged in bricks, and fountains which feature in the courtyards.

The grounds of the hospital are also significant for containing rare stands of native Cumberland Plain vegetation.

The Joanna Walker Memorial Children's Hospital is a rare survival of a convalescent hospital specifically designed for children.

The prime cultural significance of the Thomas Walker Convalescent Hospital estate and its buildings is that it is a 'palimpsest'; a many layered site, which encompasses all of the above-mentioned broad and capricious backgrounds from the first Aboriginal habitation, through the spectra of 200 years of white settlement, to that of its latest use by the Rivendell Adolescent Unit.

The main building is part of the grand architecturally coherent group designed by Sir J Sulman in the Queen Anne style and built by philanthropist Sir Thomas Walker in the late 19th century as a hospital. It is set in notable parklike grounds, a landmark on the Parramatta River.

The site is important for its connections with the Walker family and late 19th century philanthropy, its design quality and craftsmanship, its association with the architect John Sulman and its location with other local health and welfare facilities.

Thomas Walker Convalescent Hospital was listed on the New South Wales State Heritage Register on 2 April 1999 having satisfied the following criteria.

The place is important in demonstrating the course, or pattern, of cultural or natural history in New South Wales.

The place is important for its connections with the Walker family of Yaralla and especially with Thomas Walker whose importance in Australia's commercial, social and political development should not be forgotten.

The place is important in demonstrating aesthetic characteristics and/or a high degree of creative or technical achievement in New South Wales.

Thomas Walker Convalescent Hospital is an outstanding example of Sulman's work. The elegance of the design and quality of craftsmanship evidenced by the stonework, brickwork, joinery, plasterwork and carpentry set it apart from many buildings of its time. The building has been well maintained and is virtually unchanged from its original form.

The Hospital and its associated buildings and landscape form a vital part of the Parramatta River foreshore. The building has an outstanding [sic] sense of place, dominating the immediate part of the river.

The place has strong or special association with a particular community or cultural group in New South Wales for social, cultural or spiritual reasons.

Thomas Walker Convalescent Hospital is one of the finest examples of late 19th century philanthropy, an important aspect of society at that time.

The place has potential to yield information that will contribute to an understanding of the cultural or natural history of New South Wales.

Forms an important group of health and welfare facilities along with the Dame Eadith Walker Convalescent Hospital and Concord Repatriation Hospital.
