= Rivendell Child, Adolescent and Family Unit =

Thomas Walker Hospital
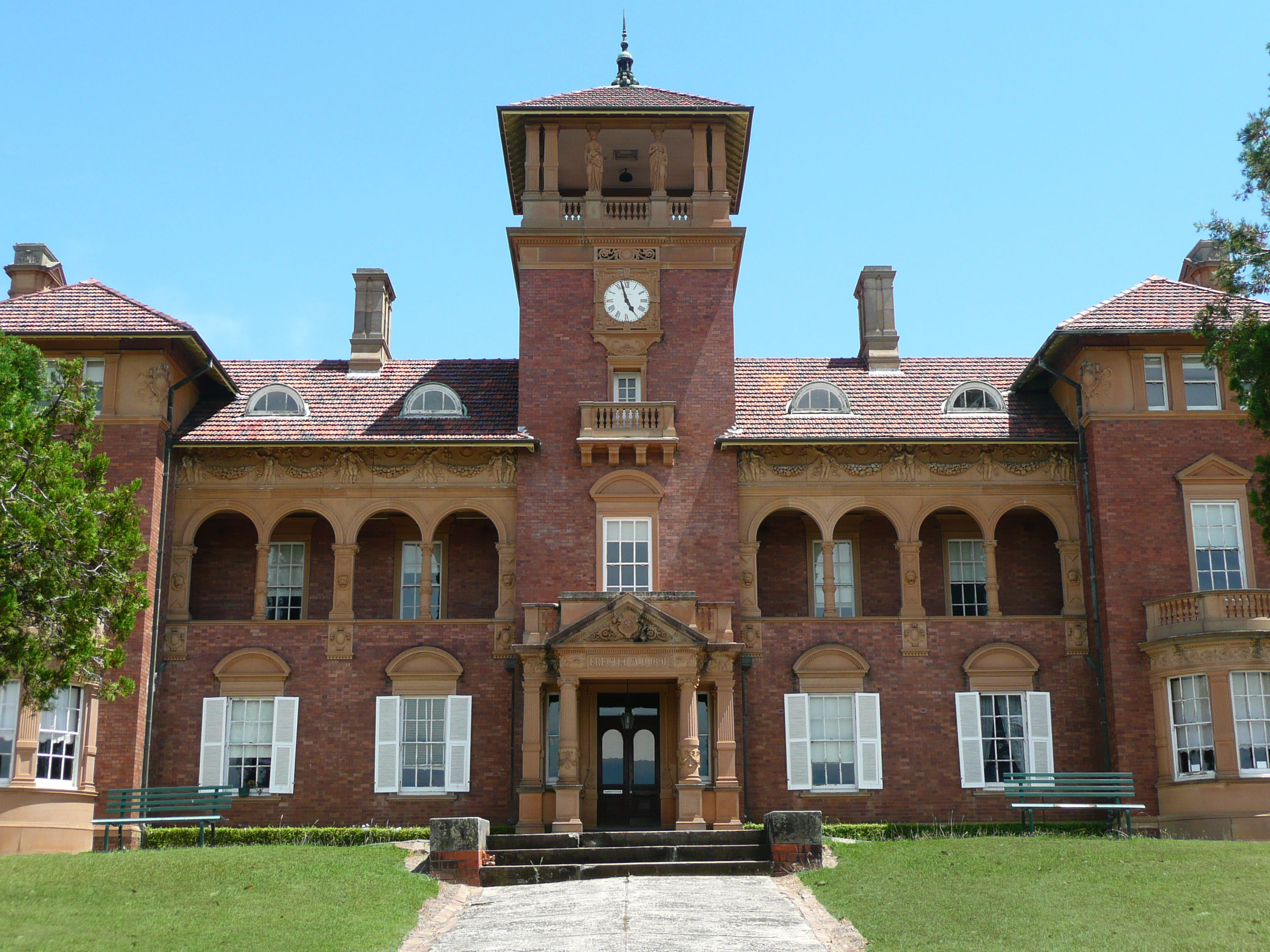
- Thomas Walker Hospital, now Rivendell

General information
- Location: Concord West, Hospital Road, Sydney, Australia
- Coordinates: 33°49′57″S 151°05′52″E
- Construction started: 1890
- Opened: 21 September 1893

Technical details
- Grounds: 32 acres (13 ha)

Register of the National Estate
- Official name: Thomas Walker Convalescent Hospital
- Designated: 21 Mar 78

New South Wales Heritage Register
- Official name: Thomas Walker Convalescent Hospital
- Designated: 2 April 1999
- Reference no.: 00115

Rivendell Child, Adolescent and Family Unit is a mental health facility specialising in the problems of young people. It is located at Hospital Road, Concord West, New South Wales, Australia. The facility is housed in the former Thomas Walker Hospital, which is listed on the New South Wales Heritage Register.

== Description and history ==
Rivendell Unit was originally located at Broughton Hall, Lilyfield, before being relocated to Concord West in 1977. Its founding director was Dr Marie Bashir, later to become Governor of New South Wales. Dr Bashir was replaced by Professor Joseph Rey in 1988.

Rivendell is, as of 2009, a twenty-bed facility offering mental health services for children and adolescents in the Sydney area and rural New South Wales. Care is provided on both an outpatient and inpatient basis. Around five hundred children and their families are helped by Rivendell each year. Rivendell is a teaching hospital of the University of Sydney.

The Concord West premises are located on the banks of the Parramatta River and were originally known as the Thomas Walker Hospital. They were designed by Sir John Sulman and built from 1891 to 1893 by A.M.Allan. The money came from the will of the philanthropist Thomas Walker, who had lived in the Italianate mansion Yaralla, also located at Concord West (and now known as the Dame Eadith Walker Hospital). The buildings are made of brick and sandstone, which is characteristic of the Federation Free Classical style. They feature marble fireplaces and cedar joinery, and are considered an important example of John Sulman's work. They are now listed on the Register of the National Estate.

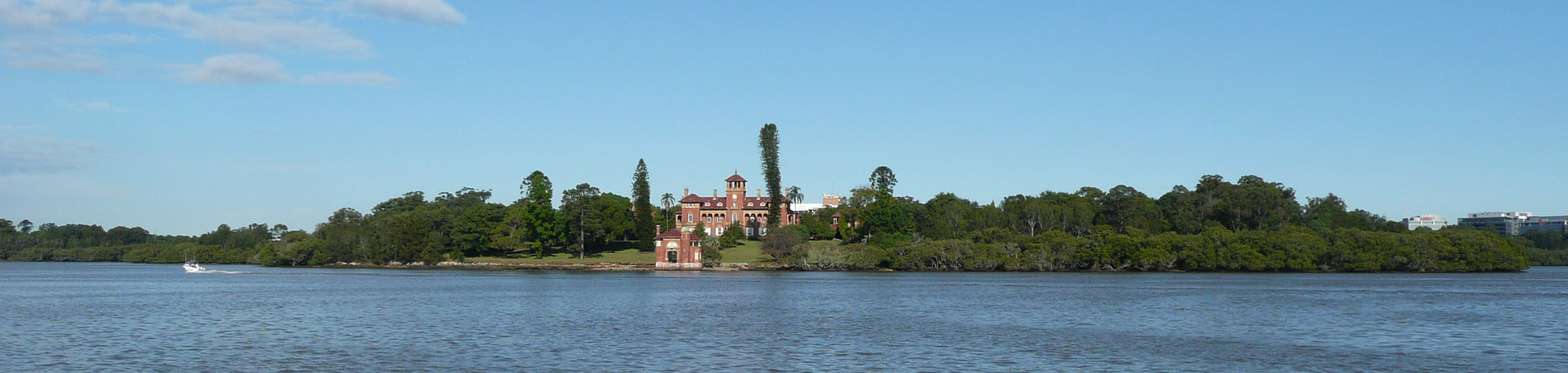
Rivendell Child, Adolescent and Family Hospital from the Parramatta River

== Opera night ==
Opera Night at Rivendell is held annually and is a major fund-raising event. It is an open-air event and routinely draws two thousand people. The 2008 opera raised money that went towards the purchase of equipment for the hospital's intensive care unit. Money raised by the 2009 event was earmarked for the hospital's clinical school. Music was provided by the Rivendell Philharmonic Orchestra, a 35-piece orchestra led by the conductor Steven Hillinger.

== Rivendell Flower Show ==
In 2017 it was announced that Rivendell would play host to the Rivendell Flower Show in September 2017 as a fund-raising event for Concord Hospital with all money raised to go to the Department of Geriatric Medicine. The event is expected to host display gardens, keynote speakers, activities, floral arrangements, workshops, high tea and performances from the local community.

== Film Location ==
The scenes of the film The Great Gatsby (2013) showing the sanatorium where Nick Carraway visits his psychiatrist were filmed at Rivendell. Scenes from the film "Flirting" were also filmed at Rivendell.

== Gallery ==
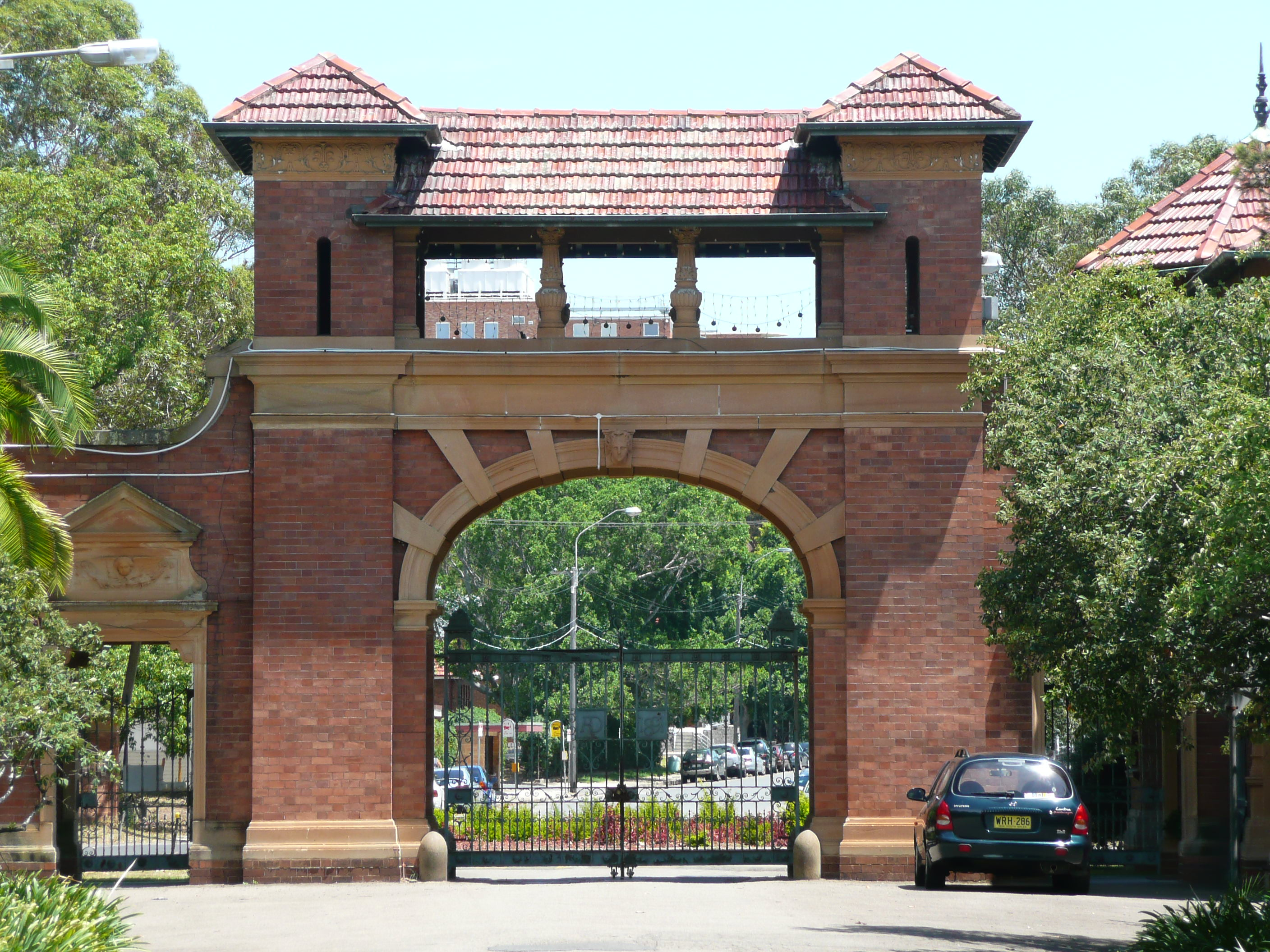
Main gates

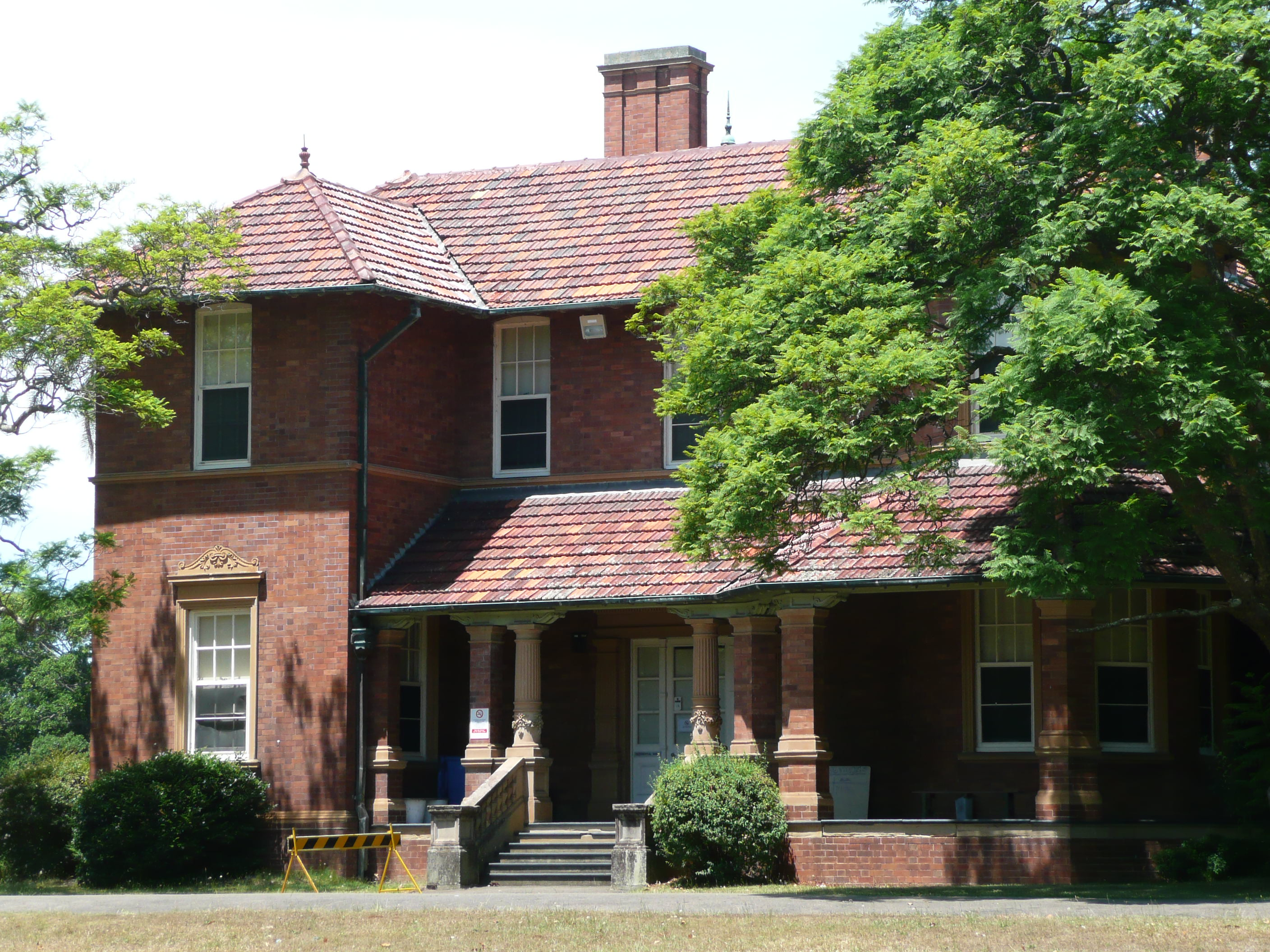
Side view

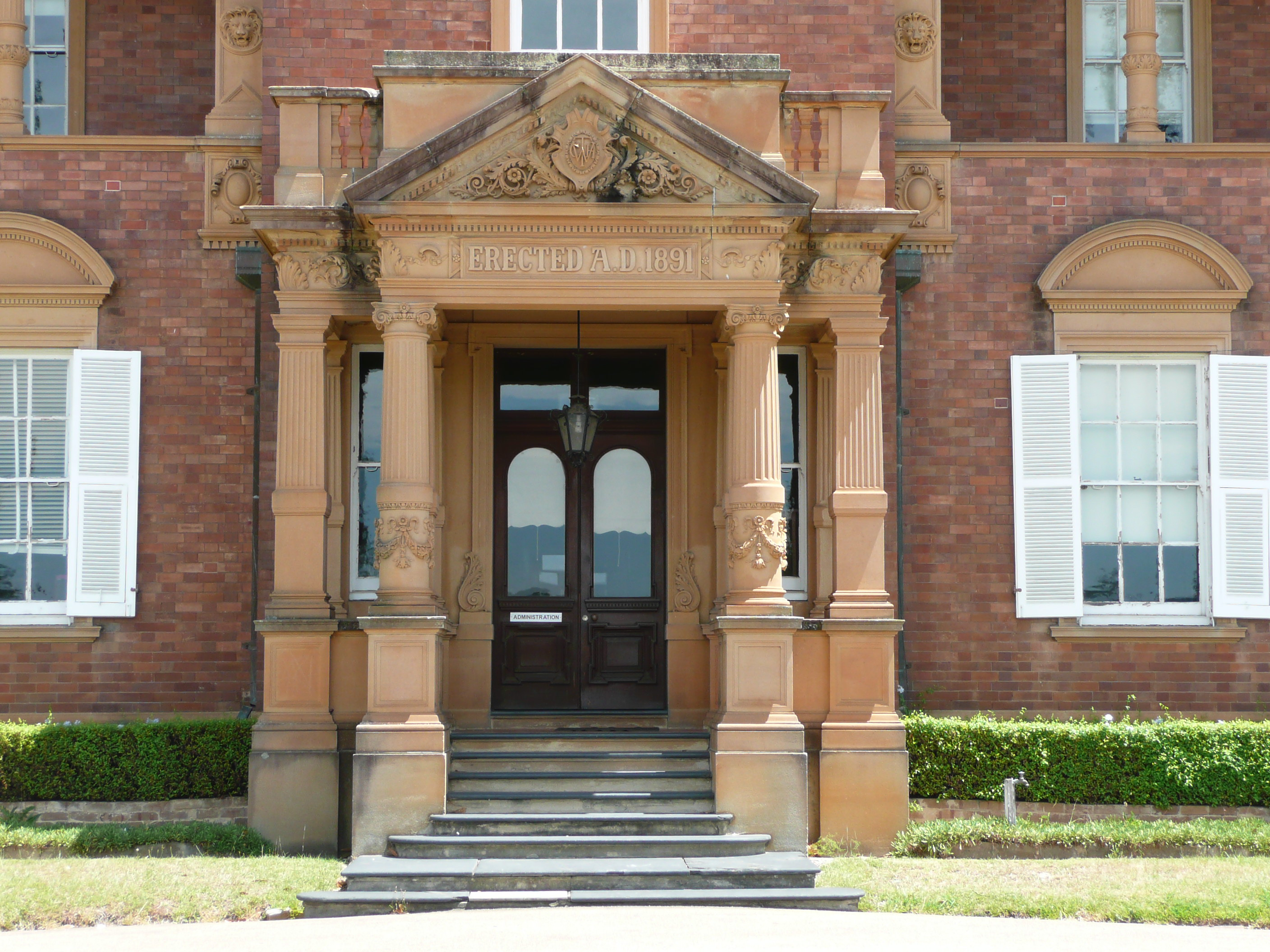
North entrance

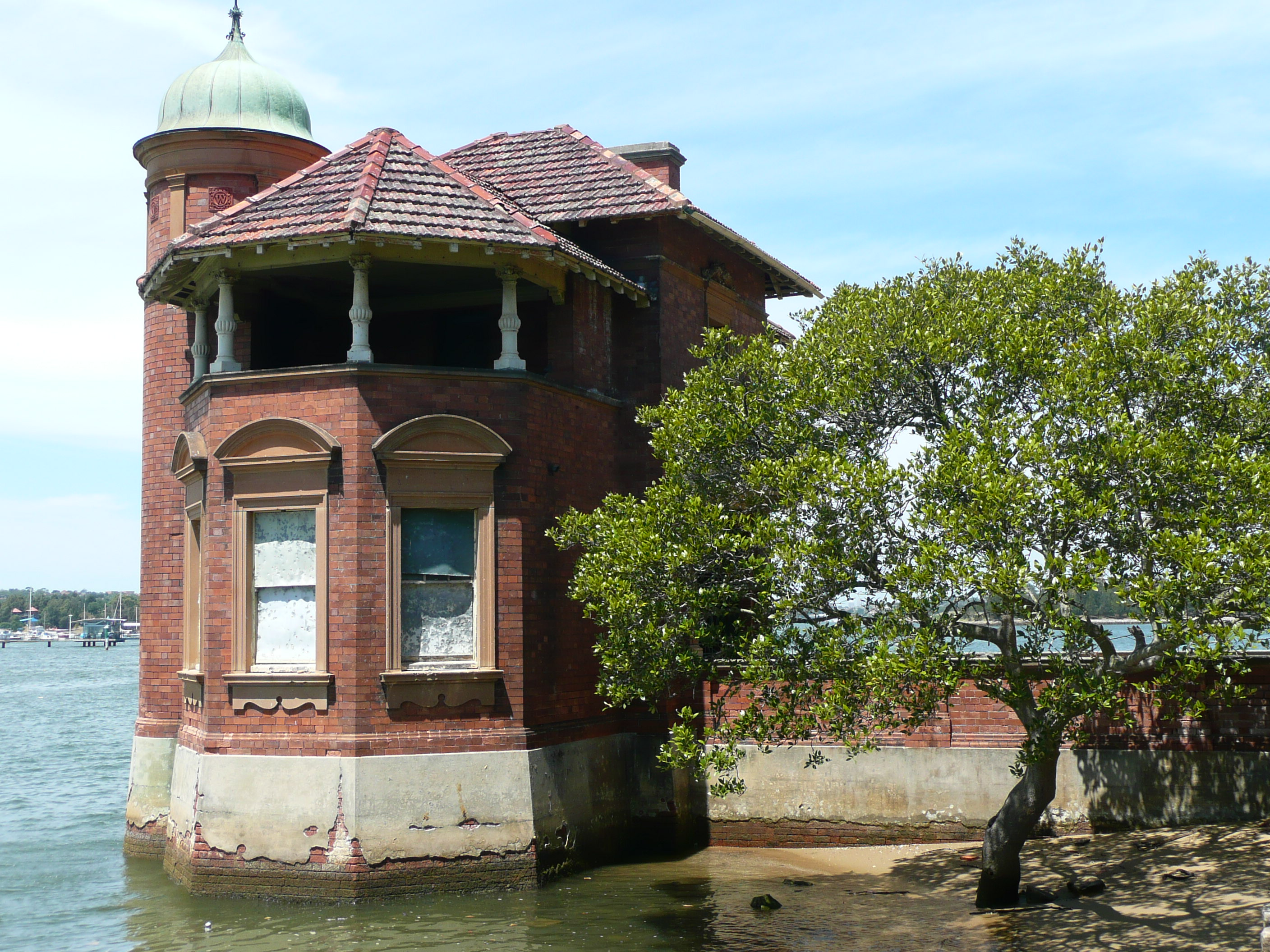
Water gate where guests sometimes arrived by boat
