= Concord West =

- Suburb
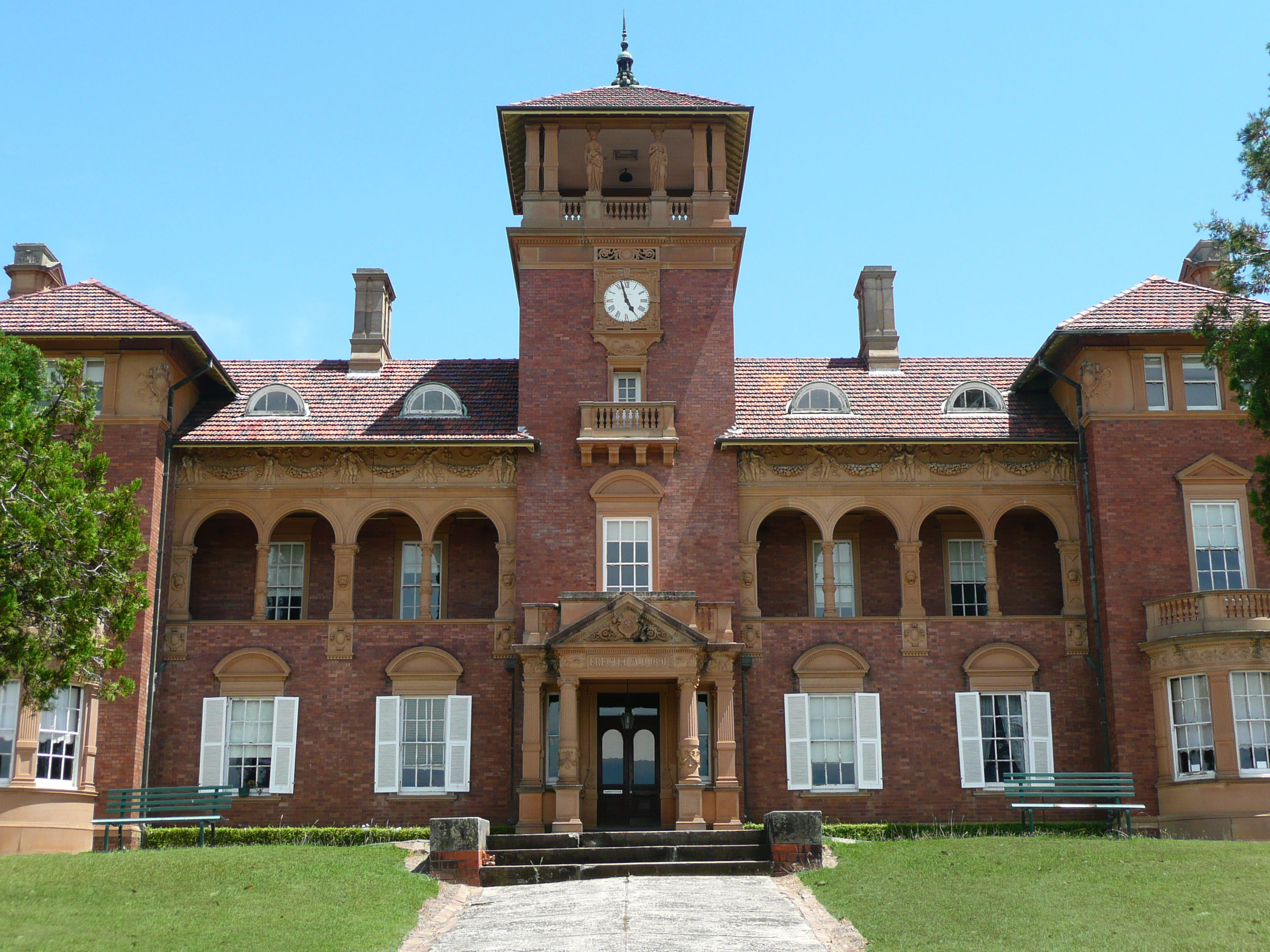
- Thomas Walker Hospital, now Rivendell

- Interactive map of Concord West
- Country: Australia
- State: New South Wales
- City: Sydney
- LGA: City of Canada Bay
- Location: 16 km (9.9 mi) west of Sydney CBD

Government
  - State electorates: Drummoyne; Strathfield
  - Federal division: Reid
- Elevation: 17 m (56 ft)

Population
  - Total: 6,178 (SAL 2021)
- Postcode: 2138
Suburbs around Concord West
Rhodes	Ryde	Putney
Liberty Grove, Olympic Park	Concord West	Mortlake
Homebush	North Strathfield	Concord

Concord West (also known as West Concord) is a suburb in Sydney's inner-west, in the state of New South Wales, Australia. Concord West is located 16 km west of the Sydney central business district, in the local government area of the City of Canada Bay. Concord is a separate suburb, to the east.

Concord West is bordered on the west by Rhodes, Liberty Grove and Homebush Bay; to the south by North Strathfield and Homebush; and to the east by Concord, Breakfast Point, Cabarita and Mortlake. It shares the postcode of 2138 with Rhodes.

The suburb takes its namesake from the town of Concord, Massachusetts in the United States of America.

== History ==
Concord takes its name from Concord, Massachusetts, in the United States. It was the site of the Battle of Concord, the first military engagements of the American Revolutionary War (1775–1778). Some believe the suburb was named Concord to peace between soldiers and settlers. The first land grants in the area were made in 1793.

Concord West was under the jurisdiction of Concord Council, until it amalgamated with Drummoyne Council in 2000 to form the City of Canada Bay. The surrounding parish is also named Concord Parish.

A major historical figure in the area was Thomas Walker (1804–1886), a philanthropist who lived in the Victorian Italianate mansion, Yaralla, on the shores of Parramatta River. When he died, Walker left substantial funds for the establishment of a convalescent hospital in the area. The hospital—known as the Thomas Walker Hospital—was designed by Sir John Sulman in the Federation Free Classical style and built on a large site north-west of Yaralla. It is now listed on the Register of the National Estate. Since the late 1970s, it has functioned as Rivendell Child, Adolescent and Family Unit, which specialises in the treatment of young people with psychological problems.

Walker's philanthropic work was continued by his daughter Dame Eadith Walker (1861–1937), who was appointed a Commander of the Order of the British Empire in 1918, and was subsequently appointed to be a Dame Commander in 1928. The family home, Yaralla, eventually became the Dame Eadith Walker Hospital; like the Thomas Walker Hospital, it was listed on the Register of the National Estate. Dame Eadith also aided in establishing the Concord Repatriation General Hospital.

The portion of Concord north and west of Concord Golf Club and Majors Bay Reserve was designated a separate suburb under the name "Concord West" and gazetted in 1993.

== Heritage listings ==
Concord West has a number of heritage-listed sites, including:

- Hospital Road: Thomas Walker Convalescent Hospital Buildings
- The Drive: Yaralla Estate

== Commercial area ==
Concord West has a group of shops beside Concord West railway station. Another commercial area is located along Concord Road.

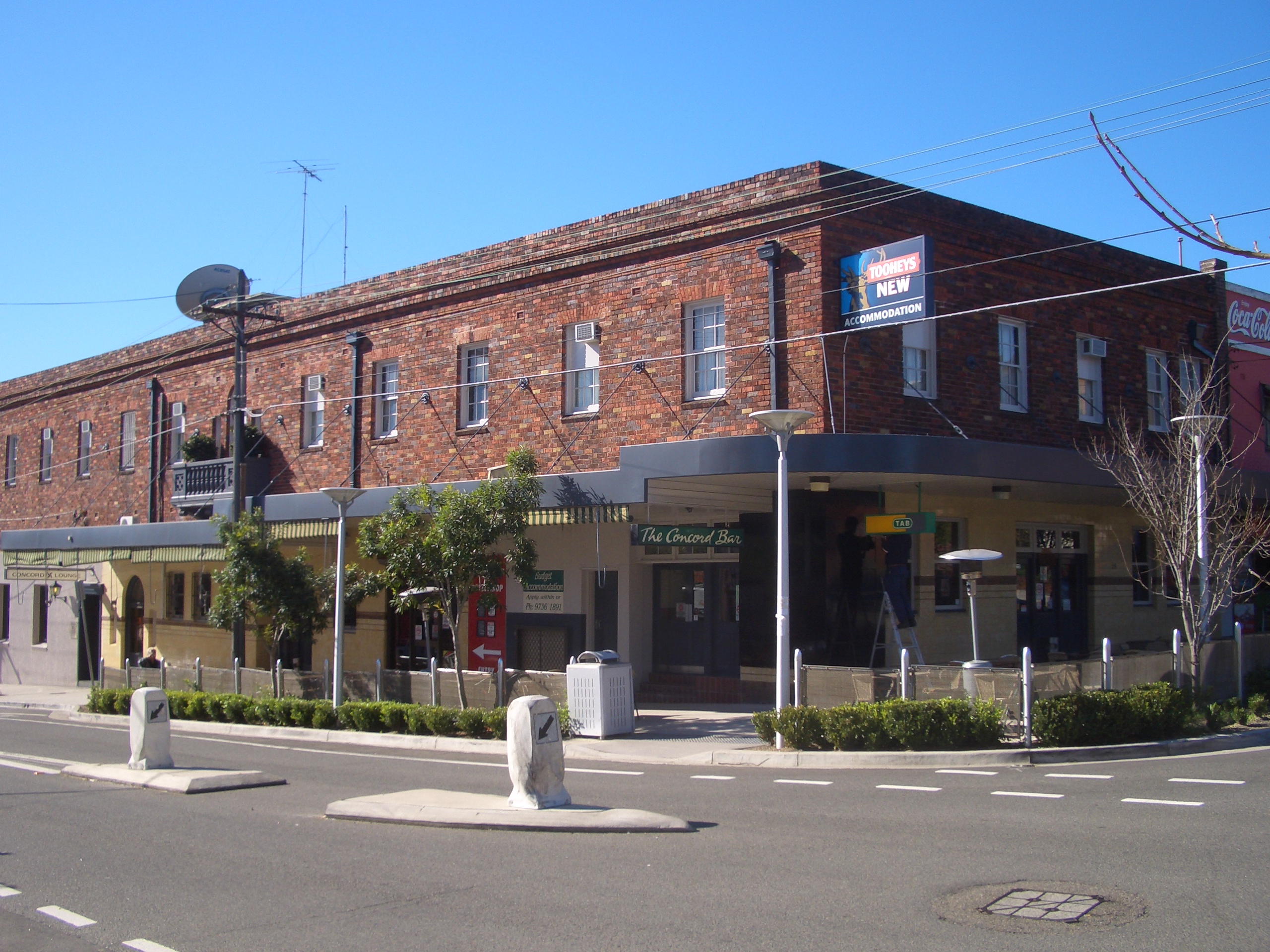
The Concord Hotel

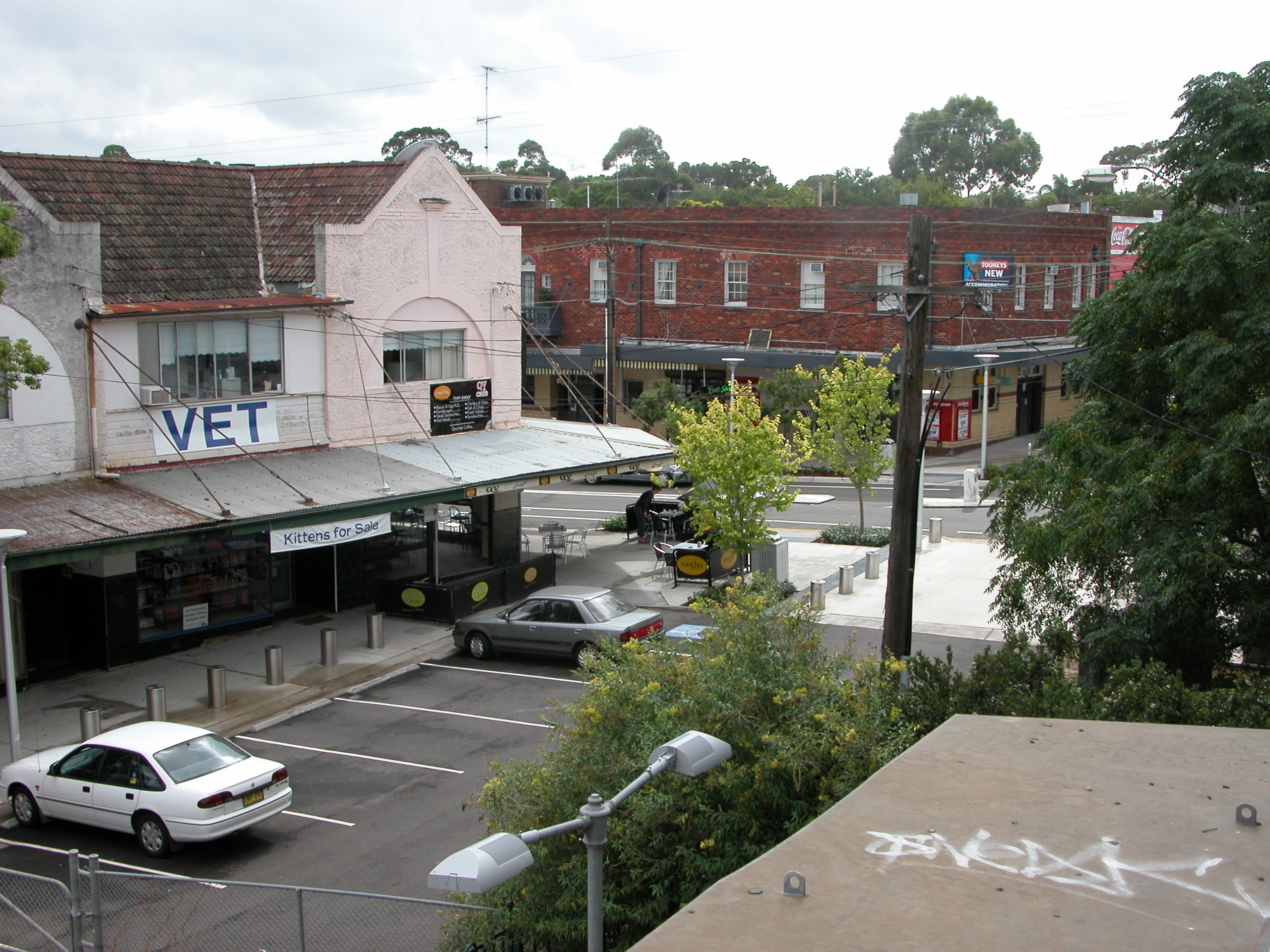
Concord West shops, view from railway station

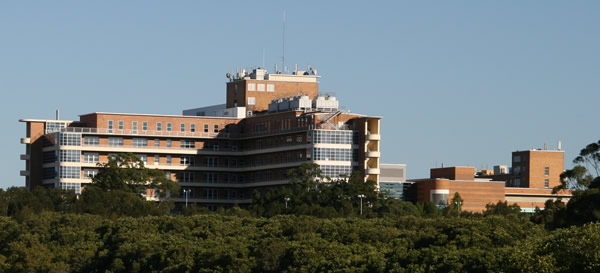
Concord Hospital

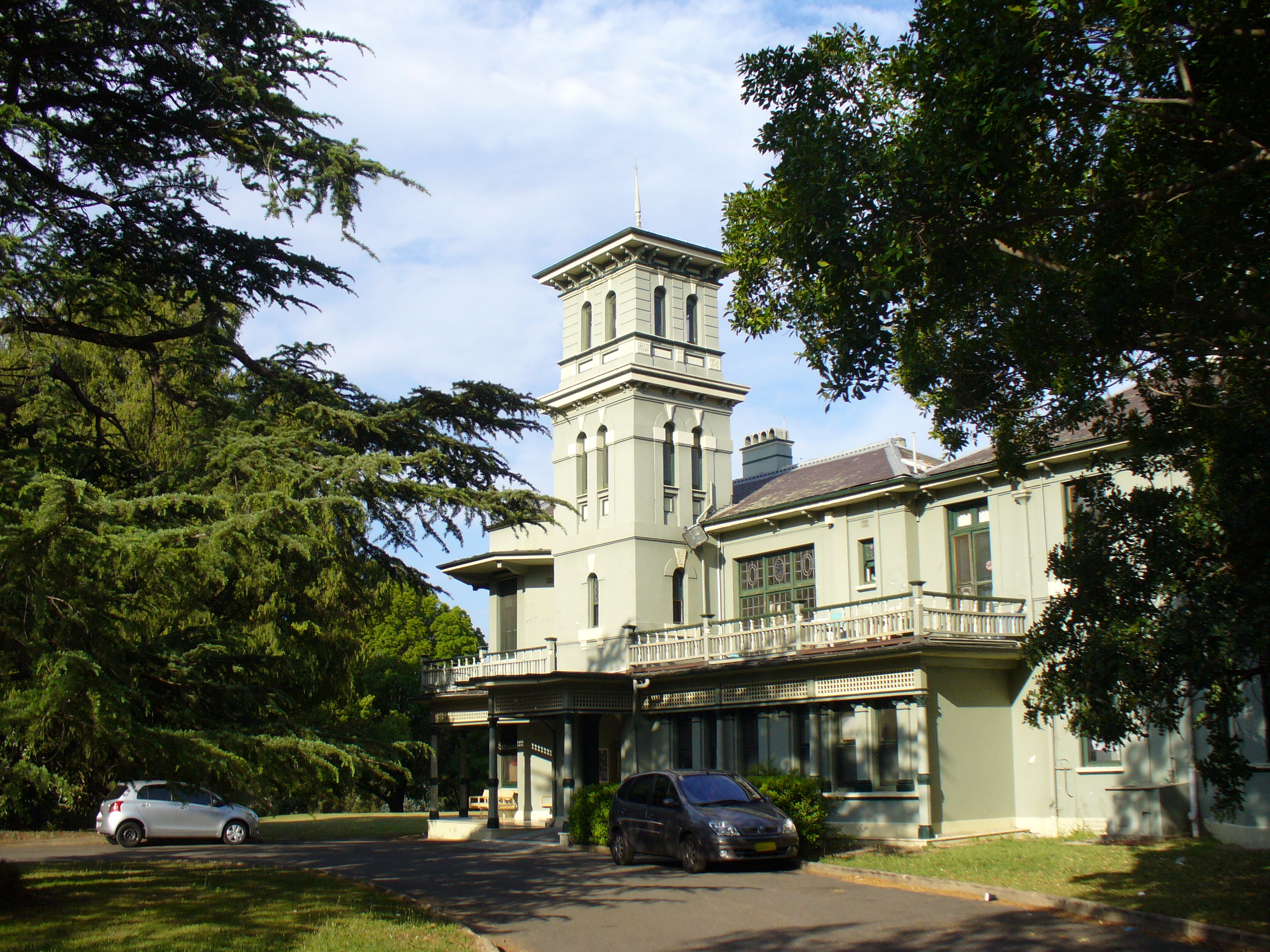
Yaralla, now the Dame Eadith Walker Hospital

== Visitors site ==
The Kokoda Track Memorial Walkway is a Walkway located near the repatriation Hospital which commemorates the Australian soldiers who participated in the New Guinea campaign during the Second World War.

== Health ==
Concord West is home to one of Sydney's major hospitals, Concord Repatriation General Hospital (commonly known as Concord Hospital). Concord Hospital has its own postcode, 2139.

The hospital grounds, particularly around the Dame Edith Walker Hospital in the Yaralla Estate to the south, contain some remnants of critically endangered Sydney Turpentine-Ironbark Forest in a relatively intact state.

== Transport ==
Concord West railway station is on the Northern Line of the Sydney Trains network.

There are also various buses which service in and around the Concord West area.

== Schools ==
Concord West Public School is serving K-6. St Ambrose Catholic Primary School is a catholic primary school serving K-6. Victoria Avenue Public School is a government school serving K-6.

== Churches ==
- St. Ambrose Catholic Church

== Pop culture ==
- Concord Repatriation General Hospital provides the external shots for the fictional All Saints General Western Hospital in the Australian television drama series All Saints.
- Australian mini series Bangkok Hilton was partly filmed in the grounds of the Thomas Walker Convalescent Hospital.
- Hollywood blockbuster Superman Returns features shots of Rivendell Hospital, portraying Vanderworth Mansion.

== Demographics ==
According to the 2021 census, there were 6,178 residents in Concord West. The most common ancestries in Concord West were Australian 18.2%, English 18.0%, Italian 17.8%, Chinese 14.7%, and Irish 9.4%. 60.9% of people were born in Australia; the next most common countries of birth included China (excluding Special Administrative Regions and Taiwan) 5.6%, Italy 3.6%, South Korea 2.7%, England 1.6%, and India 1.4%. 58.4% of people spoke only English at home, other languages spoken at home included Italian 6.6%, Mandarin 6.5%, Cantonese 4.1%, Korean 3.2% and Greek 2.6%. The most common responses for religion were Catholic 40.8%, No Religion 24.3%, Anglican 6.2%, and Eastern Orthodox 5.3%; a further 6.1% of respondents elected not to disclose their religion.

== Notable residents ==
- Sydney Weekender host Mike Whitney
- Luke Foley, former Opposition Leader and Labor Party politician.
