= Cosh =

Cosh may refer to:

== People ==
- Chris Cosh (born 1959), American football coach
- James Cosh (1838–1900), Scottish-Australian missionary and academic, father of Thomas Frame Cosh
- John Cosh (1915–2005), British rheumatologist
- Thomas Frame Cosh (1868–1946), Australian architect

== Science, technology, and mathematics ==
- cosh (mathematical function), hyperbolic cosine, a mathematical function with notation cosh(x)
- -COSH, a representation of the thiocarboxylic acid functional group in chemistry
- Chlorpromazine, an antipsychotic drug
- ChromeOS Shell, an operating system designed by Google

== Weaponry ==
- Baton (law enforcement)
- Club (weapon)
- Cosh (weapon)

== See also ==
- COSHH (Control of Substances Hazardous to Health Regulations 2002), a set of UK regulations
- Kosh (disambiguation)
- Chemical cosh, describing a sedative drug
- Cosh Boy, a 1953 British film
- Harry and Cosh, a British children's television series
