= Out of work: the voice of the unemployed =

Front page of first issue: Out of work

Out of work: the voice of the unemployed is a defunct supplement, that was included within the Sydney newspaper, The Communist, and issued by the Communist Party of Australia.

== History ==
The supplement began publication 16 June 1922. It is not known how long the publication of the supplement continued for, the latest existent issue found in an Australian library was published 7 July 1922. The supplement was issued out of the Sydney Trades Hall building, in Sussex Street, under the direction of the Jock Garden. The supplement focused on the struggles of the unemployed, but also Australian workers struggling to live on the basic wage. The articles within the supplement were generally critical of capitalism, anti-imperialist in tone, often took an internationalist perspective, citing the struggles of American and German workers. According to an editorial in the first edition, Out of work was, "written by the unemployed for the unemployed. We hope to make this paper a bitter voice of protest against a system which continuously starves a selection of the working class by throwing them to the streets."

== Digitisation ==
The various issues of the supplement have been digitised as part of the Australian Newspapers Digitisation Program project hosted by the National Library of Australia.

== See also ==
- List of newspapers in New South Wales
- List of newspapers in Australia
