= Rupert Minnett =

Australian architect (1884–1974)

Rupert Villiers Minnett
- Born: 2 September 1884; North Sydney, Colony of New South Wales
- Died: 24 June 1974 (aged 89); Cremorne Point, New South Wales, Australia
- Education: Sydney Church of England Grammar School
- Occupation: Architect
- Spouse: Effie Coral Maddrell
- Children: Mary (Mimi) Minnett (b.1918)
- Practice: Spain and Cosh (1904–1909); Spain, Cosh & Minnett (1910–1912); Rupert V. Minnett (1913–1938); Rupert V. Minnett & Cullis-Hill (1938–1955); Rupert V. Minnett Cullis-Hill Petersen & Powell (1955–1974)

Rupert Villiers Minnett (2 September 1884 – 24 June 1974) was an Australian architect and sportsman.

== Early life and education ==
Rupert Villiers Minnett was born on 2 September 1884 He was the son of John Alma Villiers and Ellen Minnett, who lived at Nengah, Merlin Street, North Sydney, in the Colony of New South Wales. The house has since been demolished.

He grew up in a comfortable upper middle-class household in an area where many men belonged to exclusive men's and sporting clubs, such as the Royal Sydney Yacht Squadron. John Villiers was a founding member of the Automobile Club of Australia, and both Rupert and his father were featured in "Sydneyites as we see 'em", a series of caricatures of well-known people published by the Newspaper Cartoonists Association between 1913 and 1915.

== Architectural career ==
Minnett joined the architectural firm Spain and Cosh in 1904 to do his articles, possibly through family connections with Alfred Spain. In 1910 became a partner, when the name changed to Spain, Cosh & Minnett until 1912.

Spain, Cosh & Minnett designed Sydney's first skyscraper, Culwulla Chambers, on the corner of King Street and Castlereagh Street, its 14 storeys reaching a height of 50 m (160 ft) when completed in 1912. This became Australia's tallest building, and resulted in public controversy, leading to the Height of Buildings Act 1912, to limit the height of future buildings to 150 ft (46 m)). Minnett co-designed the 140-foot (43 m) New Zealand Insurance building in Pitt Street, the headquarters for his father's company.

From 1913, he practised as Rupert V. Minnett, but enlisted to fight in the First World War in 1918. He was soon made a commissioned officer, as second lieutenant, as was customary for those from the professional classes.

In 1934, Minnett designed large new premises for North Sydney Church of England Grammar "Shore" School, which included accommodation for boarders. This entailed demolishing "The Towers", the mansion that was the former residence of Bernhardt Holtermann, taken over by the school for use as its main building in the late 19th century.

In 1936, Minnett moved his practice from the city to the suburb of Crows Nest, and started a long-term partnership with North Sydney Council. Among other work, he enlarged the Edward Jeaffreson Jackson-designed house "Kelrose", that had served as council chambers since 1926.

In 1938, he partnered with Grandison Cullis-Hill, as Rupert V. Minnett & Cullis-Hill (1938–1955). With Cullis-Hill, he designed a couple of large homes on the Berry Estate. In 1948 the firm designed one of the first blocks of flats in Wollstonecraft.

Minnett designed the Anzac Memorial Hall for North Sydney Council, opened in 1941.

The firm became Rupert V. Minnett Cullis-Hill Petersen & Powell from 1955 until Minnett's death in 1974.

Minnett died on 24 June 1974 at Cremorne, Sydney.

=== Architectural style and examples ===
His new commercial buildings in the Streamline style of Modernism, such as the O.J. Williams building at Crows Nest. Examples of his domestic architecture show a simpler and more conservative style of Modernism, sometimes featuring classical architectural elements.

== Cricket ==
Minnett played cricket and was also a pioneering baseball player in his youth.

He played six first-class cricket matches for New South Wales between 1909/10 and 1914/15.

His two other brothers, Leslie and Roy, both played for New South Wales.

== Personal life ==
Minnett married Effie Coral Maddrell (1894–1942) in 1917, and they had a daughter, Mary (Mimi) Minnett (born 1918)

== See also ==
- List of New South Wales representative cricketers
