= Manufacturers House =

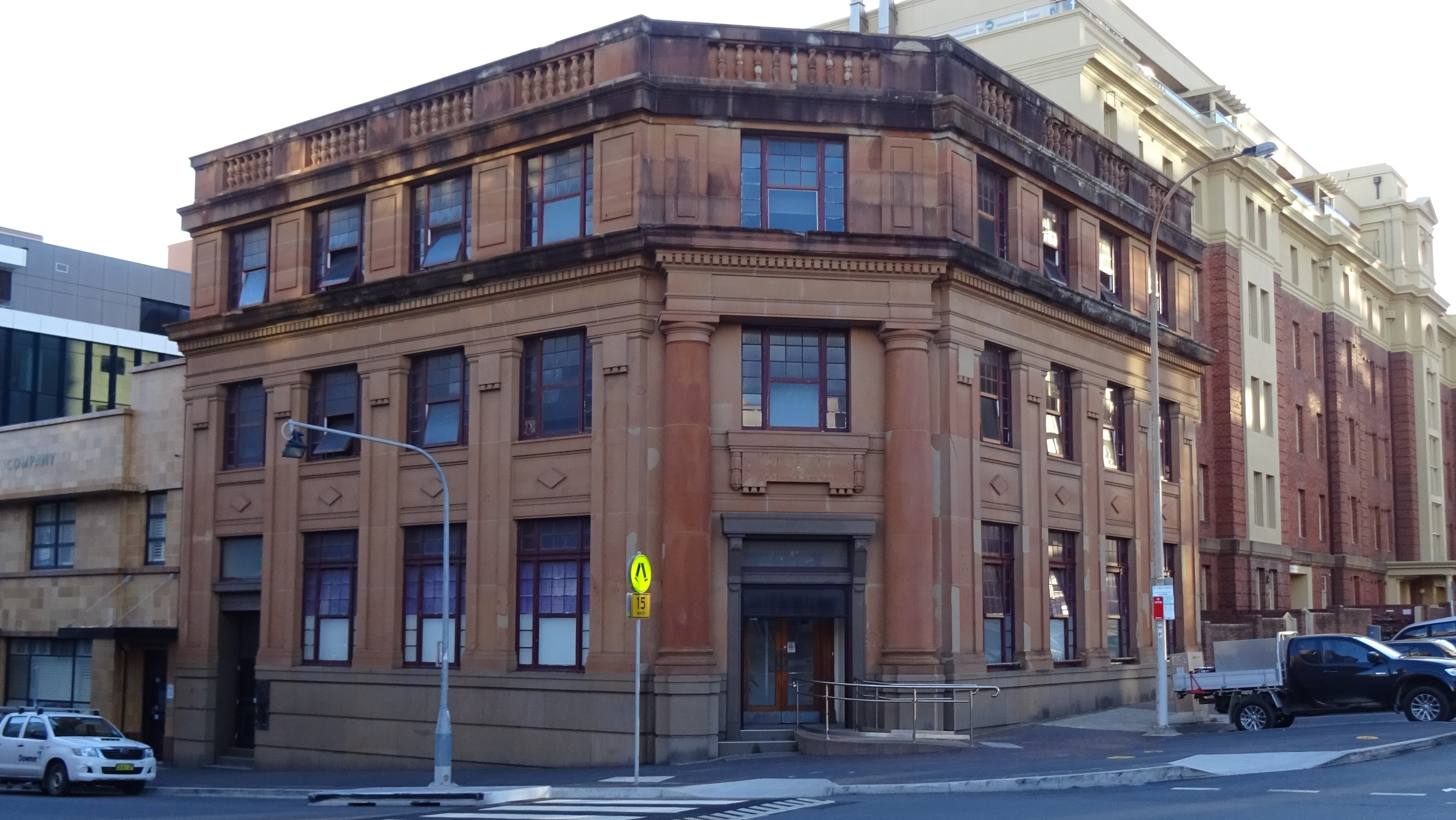
- Manufacturers House, 2018

- Location within New South Wales Location within Australia
- 32.9287°S 151.7842°E
- Location: 35–37 Watt Street, Newcastle, City of Newcastle, New South Wales, Australia

History
- Built: 1920

Site notes
- Architect: Spain and Cosh

New South Wales Heritage Register
- Official name: Manufacturers House; Manufacturer's Mutual Building
- Type: state heritage (built)
- Designated: 2 April 1999
- Reference no.: 314
- Type: Commercial Office/Building
- Category: Commercial

Manufacturers House is a heritage-listed office building at 35–37 Watt Street, Newcastle, City of Newcastle, New South Wales, Australia. It was designed by Spain and Cosh and built in the 1920s. It is also known as Manufacturer's Mutual Building. It was added to the New South Wales State Heritage Register on 2 April 1999.

== History ==
The building was constructed in the 1920s to the design of Spain and Cosh (then Spain, Cosh & Dods).

Manufacturers house was one of 30 buildings on which a section 130 order was placed in 1981 because of their importance to the Newcastle Business District and East End.

A Permanent Conservation Order was placed over the building on 15 June 1984. It was transferred to the State Heritage Register on 2 April 1999.

== Description ==
Manufacturers House is a three-storey building designed in the Classic Revival Style. Its sandstone-clad facade features a base, columns, two storeys high capped by a detailed string course and a third floor terminated with a parapet including balusters. It retains its original multi-paned windows.

A particularly fine feature of Manufacturers House is its splayed corner which incorporates the main entrance flanked by two sandstone columns.

Internally the building is divided into small offices with access of a spine corridor. Of particular interest are the stairwell and the corridor areas.

It has been substantially improved to provide modern commercial premises.

== Heritage listing ==
Manufacturers House was listed on the New South Wales State Heritage Register on 2 April 1999 having satisfied the following criteria.

The place has a strong or special association with a person, or group of persons, of importance of cultural or natural history of New South Wales's history.

Constructed in the 1920s to the design of the architects Spain and Cosh.

The place is important in demonstrating aesthetic characteristics and/or a high degree of creative or technical achievement in New South Wales.

The building is designed in Classic Revival style and is located on a prominent corner at the centre of Newcastle business district.
