= Kosh =

Kosh may refer to:

== Ukrainian culture ==
- Kosh otaman (16–18th centuries), an officer of the Zaporozhian Host
- Kosh or Kish, a military society of Zaporozhian Cossacks
- Zvenyhorodka Kosh, the biggest military formation of Free Cossacks
- Sloboda Ukraine Haidamaka Kosh, a military formation of Ukraine (1917–1919)

== Places ==
- Kosh, Armenia, a town in Armenia
- Mir Kosh, a village in Ghotki district, Sindh

== Other uses ==
- John Kosh (known as simply Kosh), album cover designer and art director
- Kosh Naranek, a fictional character in the Babylon 5 television series
- Wittman Regional Airport (ICAO Code: KOSH), an airport in Wisconsin, United States
