= Spain & Cosh =

Australian architectural firm

Practice information
- Founders: Alfred Spain; Thomas Frame Cosh
- Founded: 1904
- Dissolved: c.1940?
- Location: Sydney

Significant works and honors
- Buildings: Culwulla Chambers (1911); Mercantile Hotel (1914); Many fire stations around New South Wales

Spain & Cosh were an architectural practice formed in Sydney, Australia, in 1904 by Alfred Spain and Thomas Frame Cosh. From 1910 until 1912 they were Spain, Cosh & Minett, and from 1914 until 1920, Spain, Cosh & Dods. They were responsible for the design of many commercial buildings in Sydney, including Culwulla Chambers in Castlereagh Street (1911) and Mercantile Hotel in George Street (1914).

== History ==
=== Spain ===
Alfred Spain (1868–1954) was born in Sydney. He was articled to Thomas Rowe of Rowe & Green in 1884, when he commenced studies at Sydney Technical College. He graduated in 1890 and won a Bronze Medal by the South Kensington School of Science and Art for his design of a town hall. Spain first became a partner in Rowe, Campbell & Spain in 1893, which became Rowe & Spain in 1895, and closed after Rowe's death in 1899. Spain continued to practise on his own until 1904.

He was elected a Fellow of the Royal Institute of British Architects (FRIBA) in 1917. He also had a distinguished career in the New South Wales and Commonwealth military forces.

=== Cosh ===
Thomas Frame Cosh (1868–1946) was born in the New Hebrides (now Vanuatu). His father, James Cosh, was a Scottish Presbyterian missionary. Thomas was educated at Sydney Grammar School. He also attended Sydney Technical College, and in addition later attended two courses in architecture and building construction run by John Sulman in the Engineering School at the University of Sydney. In 1885 he was articled to Ellis & Slatyer, (Note: Charles Slatyer - see Ingleholme.) which became Slatyer & Cosh from 1893 until 1904.

Cosh was a foundation member of the Sydney Architectural Association, and later influential in the NSW Institute of Architects. In January 1933 he was honoured by a gathering at Ushers Hotel, the guests including Sir James Murdoch, Sir Hal Colebatch, and B. J. Waterhouse, president of the Architects Registration Board). The papers of the Cosh family are held at the State Library of New South Wales.

=== In practice together ===
Spain & Cosh went into practice together in 1904, and in the same year, Spain moved to England to train in the military, later being recalled for active service during World War I.

In 1910, Rupert V. Minett joined the practice, which was renamed Spain, Cosh & Minett until 1912. Spain, Cosh & Minnett was responsible for the New Zealand Insurance Company's offices in Pitt Street as well as Culwulla Chambers (1911). The latter, which fronted King and Castlereagh Streets became Australia's tallest building, at 178 ft (54 m). This resulted in public controversy, leading to the Height of Buildings Act 1912, which henceforth limited the height of future buildings to 150 ft (46 m). This height restriction was subsequently removed in 1955.

Also in 1911, the firm designed a brewery administration building for Tooth & Co. at 10B Ultimo in Federation Free Style, a building considered "a prestigious and elaborate example of the firm's brewery work".

In 1914, Robin Dods joined the firm which was renamed Spain, Cosh & Dods until 1920. James A. Cosh (nephew of Thomas Cosh) joined in 1930, and Reginald A. Stewart in 1938, when it became Spain, Cosh & Stewart.

Various other architects were associated with the firm, including Alex Virtue, Harold Ruskin Rowe (son of Thomas Rowe), Edward Green, and C. Bruce Dellit. The firm as Rowe & Spain designed 29 fire stations for the NSW Board of Fire Commissioners, including Ashfield, Manly, and Maroubra.

== Style ==
The firm was a commercial architectural firm that mainly designed buildings in current styles. Its pre-World War I buildings were mostly Federation style, and they used American Romanesque style for their warehouse designs. Between the wars, they did mostly commercial work in classical styles. However it became known for using new technologies and building materials, setting trends which continued in Sydney construction.

== Notable works ==
=== Commercial and public buildings ===
- St Clement's Church, Marrickville (1899 and 1907)
- Singleton District Hospital, Singleton (1907)
- Stoddart House (1908, originally premises for Bundock)
- Gardiner & Co., York Street, Sydney
- Grace Bros warehouse
- Trades Hall, Goulburn Street
- Edwards, Dunlop & Co. warehouse, Brisbane
- Blashki Building (1909) in Hunter Street, Sydney
- Hooper & Harrison (1909), later RTA House
- Culwulla Chambers (1911) in Castlereagh Street, then Sydney's tallest building at 12 storeys
- Tooth & Co., Brewery administration building at Ultimo (1911)
- Quarryman's Hotel (1912)
- Sydney Trades Hall additions (1912 and 1916)
- Marcus Clark Building (1913 and 1928), TAFE, Railway Square
- Dunkirk Hotel (1914)
- Mercantile Hotel (1914) in George Street
- Accountants House (1914), 117-119 Harrington Street, The Rocks
- Manufacturers House, Newcastle (1920)
- Australian Drug Company Building (1923) at Wynyard Square, one of the first reinforced concrete-framed buildings in the country
- T & G Mutual Life Assurance Building (1923), 45 Hunter Street, Newcastle originally Scottish House, built for McIlwraith, McEacharn & Co
- Lincoln House (1924) in Pitt Street
- Evening News Building (1925), later ACP offices
- Scottish House (1925 and 1927), Bridge Street, Sydney, later Singapore Airlines House
- Sailors' Home (1927 wing) in The Rocks
- Shell House (1938), later Menzies Hotel

=== Fire stations ===
- 29 fire stations, after Spain, Cosh & Minnett were appointed as architects to the Board of Fire Commissioners of NSW, including Marrickville, Ashfield, and Mosman

=== Residences ===
- Several residences in Ku-Ring-Gai Avenue, Turramurra (1899–1908; Slatyer and Cosh; Cosh; Spain & Cosh) (Note: See also Ingleholme and Cossington, Turramurra.)
- Addition to Hollowforth, Kurraba Point (1913)
