= Ingleholme =

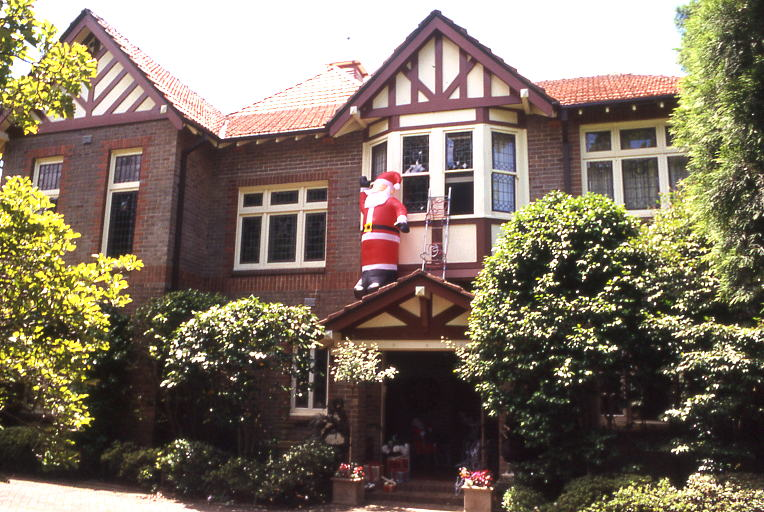
- Ingleholme, pictured in January 2008

- Location within Sydney Location within Australia
- 33°43′42″S 151°08′12″E
- Location: 17 Boomerang Street, Turramurra, Ku-ring-gai Council, New South Wales, Australia

History
- Built: 1895–1896

Site notes
- Architect: Sir John Sulman
- Architectural style: Federation Queen Anne

New South Wales Heritage Register
- Official name: Ingleholme and garage
- Type: State heritage (built)
- Designated: 2 April 1999
- Reference no.: 71
- Type: House
- Category: Residential buildings (private)

Ingleholme is a heritage-listed residence at 17 Boomerang Street, in the Sydney suburb of Turramurra, New South Wales in Australia. It was designed by Sir John Sulman and built from 1895 to 1896. It is also known as Ingleholme and Garage. It was added to the New South Wales State Heritage Register on 2 April 1999.

== History ==
=== Turramurra ===
Turramurra is 170 metres (560 ft) AHD, 30 metres (98 ft) above Pymble and 17 kilometres (11 mi) from the Sydney central business district. It has an average of 1,400 millimetres (55 in) of rain per annum, one of the highest for the Sydney metro area. It has a population of close to 11,000 and an area of 6.13 square kilometres (2.37 sq mi). It is bordered on one end by the Ku-ring-gai Chase National Park and on the other by Lane Cove National Park.

Originally a timber-getting area, European settlement begun in 1822 until after 1850 when orchardists came to occupy extensive landholdings producing a variety of citrus and other fruits including persimmons, custard apples and Chinese pears.

The Turramurra railway station was opened on 1 January 1890. The suburb was then known as Eastern Road and it was nearly a year later on 14 December 1890 that Turramurra was named after the Aboriginal word meaning "high hill". The railway brought immediate progress. In 1881 the population was only 142, by 1891 it was 788 and in 1901 1,306.

There was no electricity until 1927, water was piped from Wahroonga Reservoir and the outside loos were regularly emptied by the nightwatchman. The gaslights were lit each evening by the gaslighter. Those with very large properties kept cows for instant milk supply. Many dairies were established and the milkman delivered twice a day. By 1920, fruit fly put an end to all commercial growing of fruit on the North Shore and the land were converted into Chinese gardens.

=== Bobbin Head Road ===
Bobbin Head Road (formerly Ku-Ring-Gai Chase Road) is said to be an Aboriginal word for "a smoky place", or, named after a rock resembling a head bobbing in water when the tide comes in, or, said to be the name of a farm owned by one "Hutchinson". "Ku-Ring-Gai" is the modified version of the name of the Aboriginal tribe (Guringai) that dwelt in the region. The word was first used by Europeans in the naming of Ku-Ring-Gai Chase National Park. Boomerang Street is from an Aboriginal word for "weapon for throwing when hunting".

=== Ku-Ring-Gai Avenue ===
The most expensive subdivision, with lots of 4.0 hectares (10 acres) or more available, is the portion around Ku-ring-gai Avenue and Boomerang Street and a number of houses listed in the Sands Directory of 1903 are found here. Chinese market gardens in the area disappeared after WWII. Ku-ring-gai Avenue was owned by a few prominent people, including:

- 2 – Ellerslie 1899 – John Shedden Adam
- 8 – Mildura 1899 – Slatyer and Cosh
- 12 – Ballydown 1897 – Charles Slatyer – Martin McIlrath (second owner of Ingleholme)
- 17 – Glensloy, Wychwood 1901 – Robertson and Marks – G. E. McFarlane (tobacco merchant) Originally on a 9-acre site
- 25 – Yacaba 1897 – Walter Vindin (solicitor)
- 31 – Creighton, Cainga, Tanvally 1899 – Thomas Cosh
- 34 – Newstead, Yprina 1903 (Lichtner, chemist and importer)
- 37 – Ilanscourt 1897 – Nixon and Allen – W. J. Baker (Cutler and Instrument maker)
- 43 – Sylvan Fels, Cossington 1899 – Nixon and Allen – Grace Cossington Smith gave drawing and painting lessons.
- 44 – Waiwera 1900 – additions by Spain and Cosh (Sir Joseph Palmer Abbott); Woodstock 1905 – Spain and Cosh – W. C. Penfold
- 51 – Highfield 1917
- 54 – Erahor, Cairns 1900 – Spain and Cosh (Thomas Cosh) – Dr Cosh and later J. P Dowling
- 55 – Hampton 1900 – Alex Joske
- 56 – Strathendrick 1899 – Spain and Cosh – Mr Ward rented from Cosh
- 60 – The Terricks 1908 – Spain and Cosh, (Thomas Cosh)
- 62 – Egelabra 1908 – Spain and Cosh (Thomas Cosh)
- 77 – Talagon 1897 – Arthur Stanton Cook

=== Boomerang Avenue ===
- 2 – Sunny Law 1912 – Spain Cosh and Dodds, W. Dougall
- 6 – Clavally 1895–1900 – E. J. McCulloch (solicitor)
- 17 – Ingleholme 1896 – John Sulman.

=== Sir John Sulman ===
In 1895 John Sulman purchased three hectares (seven acres) on Ku-Ring-Gai Chase Road (now Bobbin Head Road) on which to build a house for his parents. He mapped out the road that was to be built to gain access to the site. When the cottage was nearing completion, however, his parents had a change of heart, deciding that the location was too secluded for them and "very dull". In view of this Sulman bought another property nearby, right on Lane Cove Road (now the Pacific Highway) just across the road from Womerah Avenue. It was there that he built his parents' home. They moved to their new house in 1896 and named it Addiscombe after the village in Croydon on the outskirts of London where they had lived before emigrating to Australia.

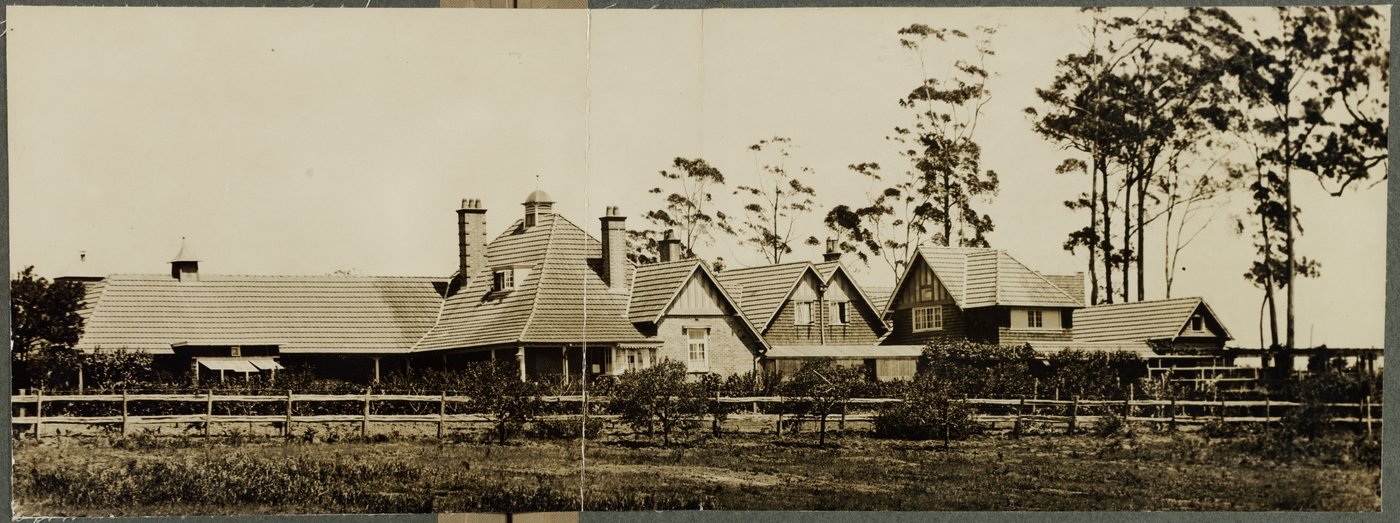
Ingleholme, Boomerang Street, Turramurra, Sydney, ca. 1906, Ingleholme, Boomerang Street, Turramurra, Sydney, ca. 1906

Sulman decided to move in to the first home and convert it to his family home and named it Ingleholme. The house was in a continual state of flux from the time Sulman decided to move in. He extended it several times as his family grew, major phases of development coinciding with the birth of his children: Geoffrey in 1894, Joan in 1896, Thomas in 1899 and John in 1906. The building he designed occupied a floor space of 60 square metres (650 ft^{2}) and comprised a drawing room, dining room, large music room, nine bedrooms, a playroom, two bathrooms, kitchen pantry, storeroom, two box rooms, extensive stabling with asphalted and covered yards, two men's rooms and outbuildings including workshop, cycle and gardener's shops, rubbish destructor and a "good gymnasium". It was replete with up-to-date home conveniences, water, gas and drainage by a perfectly acting septic tank. The grounds comprised one hectare (two acres) of garden, lawn and orchard and two hectares (five acres) of good paddocks with good views. The garden was laid out formally with spacious lawns, clipped hedges, topiary, a vine walk, a kitchen garden, drying ground, fowl yards, paddocks and a small lucerne patch.

The house is built of dark brown brick trimmed with red brick. A series of pitched and hipped roofs are covered with Marseilles tiles from which emanate towers, corbelled chimneys and gables. Sulman used cavity walls in areas exposed to weather and sold walls everywhere else. The deep porch is configured in such a way as to provide more than adequate shelter to visitors from inclement weather. French doors, retractable awnings, louvers and flap shutters kept the rooms cool during summers.

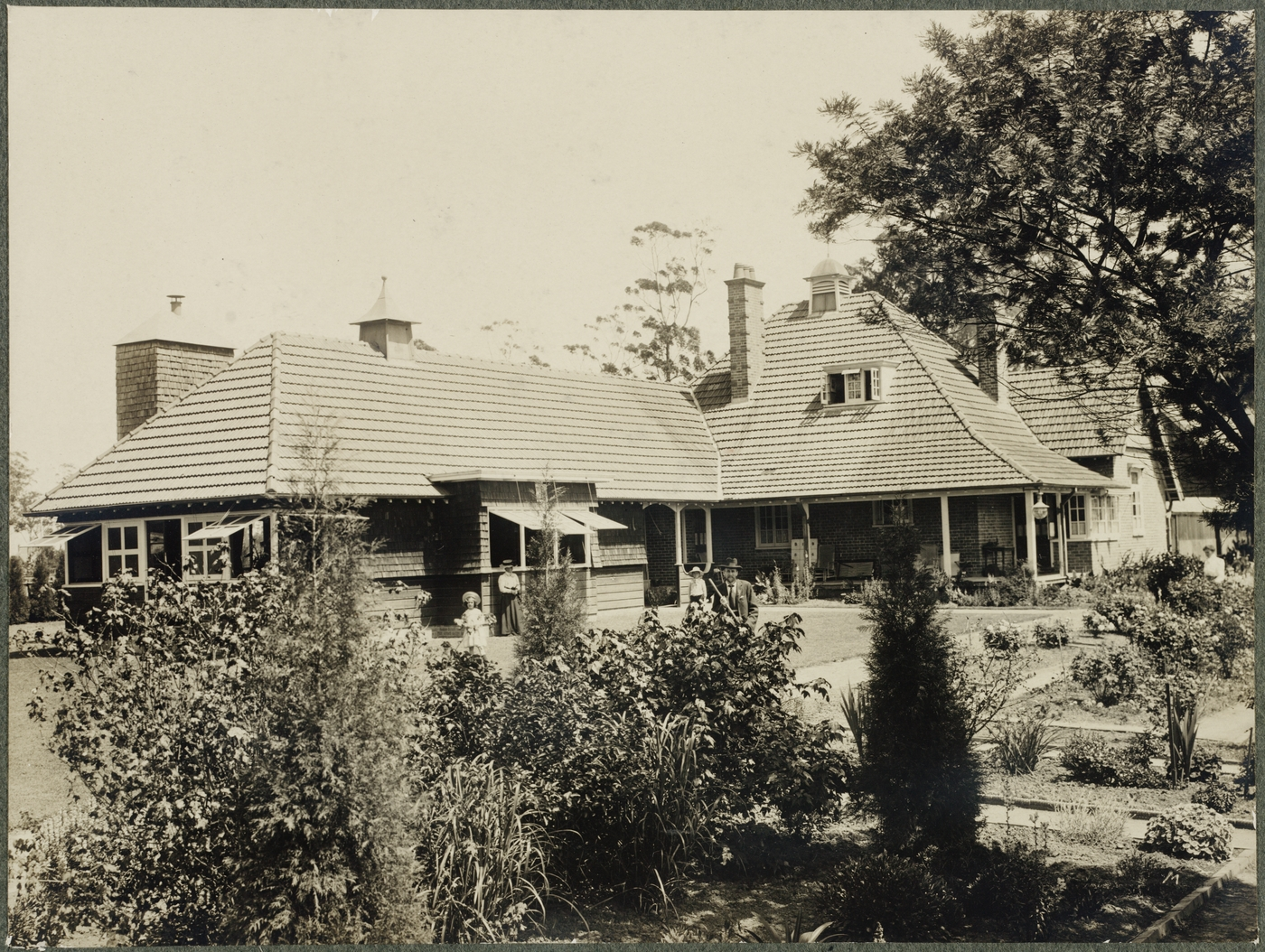
John Sulman in front yard of Ingleholme, Boomerang Street, Turramurra, Sydney, ca. 1900

The playroom extension was distinctive because of its size, designed by Sulman to serve the recreation needs of his seven children. It was a "fine large room" equipped with hung shutters. A glazed bay window above a dais let in natural light. Adjoining this was a large recessed hearth for a log fire with an iron canopy. According to Sulman the playroom was "...a source of wonder to the people of the district as there was nothing like it anywhere in the neighbourhood especially to the R.C. orchardists of the vicinity some of whom could hardly be persuaded it was not to be used as a Protestant Chapel, in which case it was intimated it would not last long and might be found in ashes any fine morning. In addition to the fireplace turret there was also a ventilator on the roof which could easily be mistaken for a bell cot. But when it began to be used for its legitimate purpose the fears of the R.C. died down and they even attended an election meeting for Charles Wade when he ran for Parliament."

Red brick accented by white trimmed windows are in the Federation Queen Anne style. Old English vernacular is represented in the use of half-timbered gables and in the oriel windows. The expansive roof extends down onto the verandah. French doors from the principal rooms open out onto the verandah and thence onto the garden. The influence of Kerr and Stevenson may be seen in the configuration of the main spaces and principal rooms. The drawing room features Adam detailing and an inglenook, a distinctive and ubiquitous feature of Sulman's domestic designs; it is the basis of the name Ingleholme.

The dining room features cedar-panelled walls.

The Sulmans lived at Ingleholme until October 1910 when it became "necessary to find a cooler climate" and alleviate Geoffrey's predisposition to digestive problems during the summer months and Annie's "rheumatism in the hands owing to living on clay soil and shale subsoil". They rented lodgings at Katoomba, Wentworth Falls and Medlow Bath in the Blue Mountains before moving to Kihilla at Lawson. Kihilla remained in the ownership of the Sulman family until it was sold in 1953. The Sulman home in Sydney was at Burrangong in Warung (Warrung) Street, McMahons Point.

== Description ==
=== Site and house ===
In 1895, three hectares (seven acres) on Ku-Ring-Gai Chase Road (now Bobbin Head Road).

=== Garden ===
The grounds comprised two acres of garden, lawn and orchard and five acres of good paddocks with good views. The garden was laid out formally with spacious lawns, clipped hedges, topiary, a vine walk, a kitchen garden, drying ground, fowl yards, paddocks and a small lucerne patch.

A row of six Bhutan cypresses (Cupressus torulosa) provide privacy and wind protection from the street.

=== Buildings ===
==== House ====
Soon after a cottage was built, named Ingleholme. It was in a continual state of flux from the time Sulman bought it. He extended it several times, major phases coinciding with the birth of his children: 1894, 1896, 1899 and 1906. The building occupied a floor space of 60 square metres (650 ft^{2}) and comprised a drawing room, dining room, large music room, nine bedrooms, a playroom, two bathrooms, kitchen pantry, storeroom, two box rooms, extensive stabling with asphalted and covered yards, two men's rooms and outbuildings including workshop, cycle and gardener's shops, rubbish destructor and a "good gymnasium". It was replete with up-to-date home conveniences, water, gas and drainage by a perfectly acting septic tank.

The house is of dark brown brick trimmed with red brick. A series of pitched and hipped roofs are covered with Marseilles tiles from which emanate towers, corbelled chimneys and gables. Sulman used cavity walls in areas exposed to weather and sold walls everywhere else. The deep porch is configured in such a way as to provide more than adequate shelter to visitors from inclement weather. French doors, retractable awnings, louvers and flap shutters kept the rooms cool during summers.

The playroom extension was distinctive because of its size, designed to serve recreation needs of seven children. It was a "fine large room" equipped with hung shutters. A glazed bay window above a dais let in natural light. Adjoining this was a large recessed hearth for a log fire with an iron canopy. According to Sulman the playroom was "...a source of wonder to the people of the district as there was nothing like it anywhere in the neighbourhood especially to the R.C.orchardists of the vicinity some of whom could hardly be persuaded it was not to be used as a Protestant Chapel, in which case it was intimated it would not last long and might be found in ashes any fine morning. In addition to the fireplace turret there was also a ventilator on the roof which could easily be mistaken for a bell cot. But when it began to be used for its legitimate purpose the fears of the R.C. died down and they even attended an election meeting for Charles Wade when he ran for Parliament.".

Red brick accented by white trimmed windows are in the Queen Anne style. Old English vernacular is represented in the use of half-timbered gables and in the oriel windows. The expansive roof extends down onto the verandah. French doors from the principal rooms open out onto the verandah and thence onto the garden. The influence of Kerr and Stevenson may be seen in the configuration of the main spaces and principal rooms. The drawing room features Adam detailing and an inglenook, a distinctive and ubiquitous feature of Sulman's domestic designs; it is the basis of the name "Ingleholme".

The dining room features cedar-panelled walls.

=== Modifications and dates ===
Ingleholme was in a continual state of flux from the time John Sulman bought it (ostensibly for a home for his parents) and decided to move in himself. He extended it several times as his family grew, major phases of development coinciding with the birth of his children: Geoffrey in 1894, Joan in 1896, Thomas in 1899 and John in 1906.

The playroom extension was distinctive because of its size, designed by Sulman to serve the recreation needs of his seven children.

== Heritage listing ==
Ingleholme was listed on the New South Wales State Heritage Register on 2 April 1999.

== See also ==
- Australian residential architectural styles
