= East Turramurra =

Coordinates: 33°43′37″S 151°08′49″E

East Turramurra is an urban locality of Turramurra which is a suburb of Sydney in New South Wales, Australia. It is the area of Turramurra which is within Bobbin Head Road to the west, Pentecost Avenue to the south, Burns Road to the north and the South Branch of Cowan Creek to the east.

The Princes Street Shops is a little shopping area within East Turramurra. Kent Oval is a park which is situated in East Turramurra and Irish Town Grove is a little Grove which runs from Princes Street shops up to Adams Avenue. Mostly it is a residential part of Turramurra.

== Climate ==
Climate data for East Turramurra
Month	Jan	Feb	Mar	Apr	May	Jun	Jul	Aug	Sep	Oct	Nov	Dec	Year
Mean daily maximum °C (°F)	25 (77)	24 (75)	23 (73)	20 (68)	17 (63)	14 (57)	14 (57)	15 (59)	18 (64)	20 (68)	22 (72)	23 (73)	21 (70)
Mean daily minimum °C (°F)	16 (61)	15 (59)	14 (57)	13 (55)	8 (46)	6 (43)	4 (39)	7 (45)	8 (46)	10 (50)	12 (54)	14 (57)	11 (52)
