= Singleton District Hospital =

- Location within New South Wales Location within Australia
- 32.5673°S 151.1858°E
- Location: 25 Dangar Road, Singleton, Singleton Council, New South Wales, Australia

History
- Built: 1907

Site notes
- Architect: Spain and Cosh
- Owner: NSW Department of Health

New South Wales Heritage Register
- Official name: Singleton District Hospital; Singleton Hospital; Dangar
- Type: state heritage (complex / group)
- Designated: 2 April 1999
- Reference no.: 833
- Type: Hospital
- Category: Health Services
- Builders: Conolly and Stidwell

Singleton District Hospital is a heritage-listed hospital complex at 25 Dangar Road, Singleton, Singleton Council, New South Wales, Australia. It was designed by Spain and Cosh and built in 1906-07 by Conolly and Stidwell. It was added to the New South Wales State Heritage Register on 2 April 1999.

== History ==
The Singleton District Hospital was the first permanent hospital established in this district when it was completed in 1907. Both the site and what was variously reported as most or all of the total cost of the hospital, £8333 10s 5d, were donated by Albert Augustus Dangar, of the prominent Dangar family. The hospital was initially named the Dangar Cottage Hospital. Dangar also donated £4156 2s 6d towards a hospital endowment. Prior to Dangar's gift, residents had been complaining that local health facilities were inadequate for several years without resolution.

By 1954, it was treating an average of 41 patients daily, reaching its then-highest monthly total of 177 patients in November that year. The hospital lacked maternity facilities for many years, with births taking place at the Fairholme Maternity Hospital. The hospital name changed to the Singleton District Hospital in 1956. A maternity section opened at the hospital on 2 August 1961.

A $7 million expansion and redevelopment of the hospital, including a new West Wing, formally opened in February 2018.

In 2018, the hospital continues to operate from the original site, offering services including an emergency department, surgery and day surgery, obstetrics, renal dialysis, palliative care, other specialists and allied health.

== Description ==
The hospital is a substantial two storey central building built in the Federation Arts and Crafts Style with attached shingled projecting window bays and verandah flanked on either side by single storey wings, enclosed by verandahs supported on brick and timber columns.

== Heritage listing ==
The hospital is of architectural significance as an example of an early 20th century country hospital design in the Federation Arts and Crafts style. It is also of historical significance of an important local community building.

Singleton District Hospital was listed on the New South Wales State Heritage Register on 2 April 1999.
