= Highfield College =

- Turramurra, New South Wales; Australia

Information
- Type: Independent, day and boarding school
- Denomination: Non-denominational
- Established: 1907
- Status: Closed
- Closed: 1915
- Key people: Leslie Alfred Redgrave (Founder & proprietor headmaster)

Highfield College was an independent, day and boarding school for boys, in Turramurra, on the North Shore of Sydney, New South Wales, Australia.

== History ==
The school was opened in 1907 at 51 Ku-ring-gai Avenue, Turramurra, in a house owned by William John Baker. The property was rented by the Redgrave family and Leslie Alfred Redgrave was the proprietor and headmaster of the school. His brother Wilfred Harold ran the junior school. Advertising for the school said:

(a) An Ideal Home for Young Boys, with a mother's care, and best of food, and every comfort.
(b) Primary and Secondary Education, with the Individual Attention of Graduate Masters.
(c) Specially equipped Classrooms, Dormitories, and playing Fields, in a fine healthy climate. On its closure in 1915 the building was demolished and redeveloped with a new home in 1917.

== Notable alumni ==
- Sir George Francis Reuben Nicklin, KCMG, MM, Premier of Queensland from 1957 to 1968

== See also ==
- List of non-government schools in New South Wales
