= Mercantile Hotel =

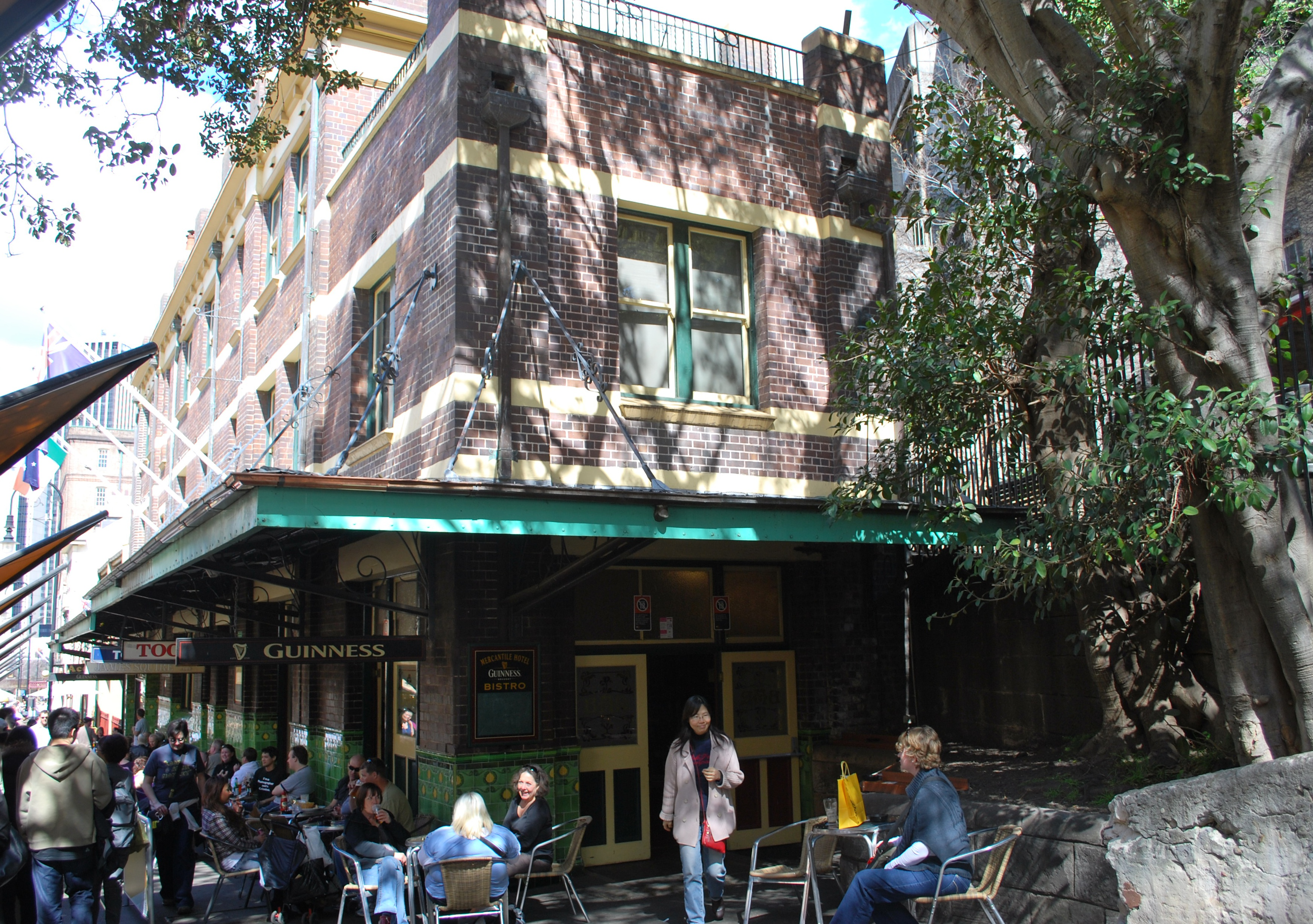
- The hotel in 2010

- Location within Sydney Location within Australia
- 33.8572°S 151.2084°E
- Location: 25–27 George Street, The Rocks, City of Sydney, New South Wales, Australia

History
- Built: 1914
- Built for: Tooth & Co.

Site notes
- Architect: Spain & Cosh
- Architectural style: Federation Free Style
- Owner: Place Management NSW

New South Wales Heritage Register
- Official name: Mercantile Hotel; Shell shop
- Type: State heritage (built)
- Designated: 10 May 2002
- Reference no.: 1560
- Type: Hotel
- Category: Commercial

The Mercantile Hotel is a heritage-listed pub located at 25–27 George Street, in the inner city Sydney suburb of The Rocks in the City of Sydney local government area of New South Wales, Australia. It was designed by Spain & Cosh Architects and built in 1914. The property is owned by Place Management NSW, an agency of the Government of New South Wales. It was added to the New South Wales State Heritage Register on 10 May 2002.

== History ==
In its pristine state the site had a sharply angled rock wall snaking through it which prevented its early development. In 1834 it formed part of a land grant to Robert Campbell. It was then sold in 1848 to William Reilly. In 1872 it was partially levelled and then used intermittently as a store for timber, coal, leather goods or marble (either in sheds or open air) along with a series of small stables. Around 1900 the rough rock face was straightened and the present stone wall supporting Gloucester Street (now Gloucester Walk) was built. In 1907 the land was compulsorily resumed from the Eady Estate under the NSW Government resumption of The Rocks. The site remained disused until 1912, when a marble yard operated, until the construction of the Mercantile Hotel in 1914.

The Mercantile Rowing Club Hotel had been built in 1878 at the George Street end of Gloucester Street, 200 metres (660 ft) from the present Mercantile Hotel, which was directly related to the Mercantile Rowing Club boathouse nearby. The club had to vacate its boathouse site in 1910, and the club re-formed itself as the Mosman Rowers Club relocating to Mosman Bay. James Dwyer, the licensee of the Mercantile Rowing Club Hotel since 1898, surrendered the licence in 1914 and moved to the newly completed Mercantile Hotel. The building of this hotel was part of the expansionism of the major brewing firm, Tooth and Co., whose architects were the well known Sydney firm of Spain & Cosh.

The Mercantile Hotel at 25 George Street has continued its use as a hotel to the present day, with little change to its external fabric but with some ground floor rearrangement of the public spaces, and some updating of the accommodation of the upper floors. The shop at 27 George Street was conceived from the outset as separate premises, used on the ground floor variously as a light refreshment room, a mixed business and cafe. From 1963–1989 Marine Specimens Pty Ltd ran a Shell Shop, providing a library and reading area on the first floor from 1968 and a meeting place for the Malacological Society. In 1989 No. 27 was incorporated into the lease of the Mercantile Hotel, and the renovation in 1989-90 allowed the upper floor rooms to provide additional bedrooms for the hotel, and further work connected to the ground floor rooms of the shop and hotel in 1993.

== Description ==
The three-storey building, a restrained example of Federation Free Style, is of brick wall construction with timber floors and a malthoid roof. The simplicity of the hotel's overall form, materials and detailing is relieved only by the restrained modelling of the cornice, a little decoration in the roof-deck's iron balustrade and at street level, by the richly coloured glazed ceramic tile dado. A three-storey shop (No 27), originally completely self contained, with its own shopfront, attached kitchen and rear yard, is at the south end. Internally, the building has undergone some quite significant unsympathetic alterations, notably in the Bar and associated Lounge, and the shop has been more recently linked through to the hotel. The hotel is located on the wedge-shaped block that marks the junction of George Street with Gloucester Walk, and the building is L-shaped, with the shop having a wider footprint and with small rear yards. At the north end, the three storeys are reduced to two, and a pair of large old fig trees, low stone retaining walls and curved steps leading down from the Walk to the north forecourt add to the pleasing aspect of this key frontage.

=== Modifications and dates ===
Significant medications to the site include:

- 1950s – Second bathroom installed on both hotel floors.
- 1978 – The overall width of the awning reduced.
- c. 1985 – Original walls at west end of entry removed, walls of Parlour, Storeroom, adjacent stair and "Jug Dept"/Bottle-shop to the east were demolished, the original timber panelled bar was rearranged, original windows in the west wall were bricked up and areas of pressed metal ceilings where walls had been removed rearranged, bathrooms on the residential floors subdivided and updated.
- c. 1990 – Through link at first floor level from first floor of shop to hotel, changing use to provide additional hotel accommodation, and other less significant alterations to enable this change.
- c. 1993 – Through link at ground level, connecting "shop" to hotel, further reducing the distinction of the separate "shop". Development Application No 73–04–99 was approved by the Minister for Urban Affairs and Planning on 5 August 1999, and includes alterations to the ground floor of the former "shop" to provide a new bar, and the construction of a new cool room in the rear yard of No 27.
- 2005 – Mercantile Hotel interior repainted, recarpeted and refurbished.

== Heritage listing ==
The Mercantile Hotel and site are of State heritage significance for their historical and aesthetic cultural values. The site and building are also of State heritage significance for their contribution to The Rocks area which is of State Heritage significance in its own right. The Mercantile Hotel has local historical significance as one of the more intact survivors of late-19th and early-20th century Rocks pubs, having operated continuously since its opening in 1914 and retaining much of its original character, fabric and functions. It is the first major building to occupy this site, with its dramatic stone-walled excavation line along the west boundary providing a vivid reminder of the original physical character of both site and The Rocks as a whole. The hotel has associations with the early maritime and mercantile activity in The Rocks through its location close to key early wharves and warehouses, its provision of public house services to local workers and their families and its origins as replacement for the original Mercantile Rowing Club Hotel following that building's demolition in 1914.

The hotel is an example of the early 20th century work of the once leading Sydney architectural practice of Spain & Cosh, providing a typical and relatively intact example of the work of this respected if conservative firm, and their public hotel work in particular. It also has associations with Tooth & Co. Ltd., one of NSW's important early brewing companies, and more generally with the practice of tied hotels under which the licensee operated until 1976. It is also a component of an important historic streetscape, particularly notable in views from the north towards its exposed wedge-shaped end. The hotel's fabric retains the potential to provide information on the operation, layout, facilities and fitout of early 20th-century public hotels. Its structure and finishes provide information on early 20th-century building techniques, including the use of steel framing, finishes and detailing of flat roofs.

The Mercantile Hotel adds to the historic, aesthetic and social richness of The Rocks Conservation Area which is of both local and national heritage significance. Its location, character and continuity of service make it recognisable in the local area.

Mercantile Hotel was listed on the New South Wales State Heritage Register on 10 May 2002 having satisfied the following criteria.

The place is important in demonstrating the course, or pattern, of cultural or natural history in New South Wales.

The Mercantile Hotel operates continuously in its original function since its opening in 1914 and retains much of its original character and fabric. The hotel as an establishment has significant associations with the early maritime and mercantile activity in The Rocks and the harbour rowing regattas, as it replaced the earlier Mercantile Rowing Club Hotel. The existing building is one of the more intact survivors of The Rocks' late 19th and early 20th century Pubs, associated with one of NSW's most important brewing companies, Tooth & Co. Ltd., and with the practice of tied hotels. The stone-walled excavation on the western boundary is a physical reminder of the original character of the site and The Rocks. The building meets this criterion on State Level.

The place has a strong or special association with a person, or group of persons, of importance of cultural or natural history of New South Wales's history.

The building is a fine and intact example of the work of the renown Sydney architectural firm, Spain & Cosh. The former shop has had a part in the early 20th century commercial activity of The Rocks and has a special place in a science related activity through its longstanding use as The Shell Shop and as a meeting place of the Malacological Society. The building meets this criterion on local level.

The place is important in demonstrating aesthetic characteristics and/or a high degree of creative or technical achievement in New South Wales.

Aesthetically, the building is an interesting example of Federation Free Style architecture, with its competently handled forms and massing enriched by the decorative detailing of its tiled dado, etched glass to the main doors, awning supports and parapet balustrade. The Mercantile Hotel is a relatively intact example of the early 20th century hotel designed by the Spain and Cosh for Tooth's brewers. Both the exterior and the interior retain important components of fabric and layout, allowing interpretation of the original spatial configuration. This makes the building an example of its type, style and architectural period. It is also an important component of an important historic streetscape that features in key views of The Rocks, particularly from the north towards its exposed wedge-shaped end. The building meets this criterion on State Level.

The place has a strong or special association with a particular community or cultural group in New South Wales for social, cultural or spiritual reasons.

The hotel is of importance to its regular clientele as their local pub. Its location, character and continuity of service make it a recognisable meeting point in the local area. It has earlier associations with locals and returning visitors through the Shell Shop which occupied part of the building for 30 years, and through the Malacological Society which met upstairs. The use as a venue for Irish music has sought to establish a wider and more specific identity. The building meets this criterion on local level.

The place has potential to yield information that will contribute to an understanding of the cultural or natural history of New South Wales.

The hotel's fabric and layout, though somewhat modified, have the potential to provide information on early 20th-century public hotels, including facilities and fitout. Its structure and finishes provide information on early 20th-century building techniques, albeit the archaeological potential of the site is generally low. The building meets this criterion on local level.

The place is important in demonstrating the principal characteristics of a class of cultural or natural places/environments in New South Wales.

The building is representative of a class of purpose-built hotel, specifically the hotels built for in association with the Tooth's brewers in the Federation period. This representativeness, combined with the unique, prominent location, is considered to be of the level to meet this criterion on local level.

== See also ==
- Australian non-residential architectural styles
- 29-31 George Street
- List of pubs in Sydney
