= Florence Sulman =

English-Australian author and educationalist

Florence Sulman MBE
- Born: 13 January 1876; Bromley, Kent, England
- Died: 15 June 1965 (aged 89); Mona Vale, Sydney, New South Wales, Australia
- Education: Abbotsleigh
- Occupation(s): Author and educationalist
- Parent: John Sulman (father)

Florence Sulman MBE (13 January 1876–15 June 1965) was an English-Australian author and educationalist.

== Life and work ==
Sulman was born in Bromley, England on 13 January 1876. She was the eldest daughter of John Sulman and Sarah Clarke. She attended Miss Wheeler's school in Bromley before moving to Australia with her sister in 1886 to join her parents and brother who were living in New South Wales. Her mother died in 1888. She was educated at Abbotsleigh school in Parramatta.

She became involved with the Society of Arts and Crafts in 1910 before moving back to England with her brother Geoffrey in 1916 and began teaching craft to recovering soldiers. Her brother died in an aircraft accident in 1917 and she moved back to Sydney. She became involved with the Society of Arts and Crafts again and was the president from 1928 until 1936. She travelled throughout Europe and sent home samples from the Englishwoman Exhibition of Arts and Handicrafts, some of which were bought by Technological Museum in Sydney. She also lectured on new trends in crafting.

She published A Popular Guide to the Wild Flowers of New South Wales over two volumes between 1913 and 1914. The book was illustrated with prints by Eirene Mort. She collaborated with Mort on several other projects aimed at educating young children including a painting book and postcards.

From 1914 onwards she became involved with the Kindergarten Union of New South Wales. She was the vice-president of the Surry Hills Free Kindergarten and later president of the Kindergarten Union. During her time with the union she equipped a tea-room; established a shop called Playways Kindergarten Toy Shop; donated the money she made from her painting book on wildflowers, lectured on the development in preschool education in other countries; established a bursary at Sydney Kindergarten and Preparatory Teachers' College; and she helped to create kindergarten jobs for teachers during the depression. In 1933 she collaborated with F. H. Booth to publish Catalogue: Loan Exhibition of Antiques, Ecclesiastical Vestments and Architectural Photographs in Aid of the Kindergarten Union of N.S.W. She became an honorary life-member of the union in 1952.

She also helped her stepmother by working at the Rachel Forster Hospital for Women and Children, became involved with the state branch of the Australian Red Cross and was awarded with an MBE in 1958 for her work in children's welfare. She died in Mona Vale, Sydney on 15 June 1965.
