= Leslie Alfred Redgrave =

Australian writer

- Born: 1882; Newtown, Sydney
- Died: 15 May 1956 (aged 73–74); Wagga Wagga, New South Wales
- Education: Newington College; University of Sydney
- Occupations: Writer and headmaster
- Spouse: Ruby Ella née Bird
- Children: Geoffrey Alfred Redgrave; Ronald Leslie Redgrave
- Parent(s): Charles Alfred Hurst Redgrave; Mary Jane née Bellingham

Leslie Alfred Redgrave (1882 – 15 May 1956), was an Australian writer, grazier and headmaster. He was often published as L A Redgrave and as an educator was known as L Alfred Redgrave, B.A. Redgrave was best known for his 1913 novel Gwen: a romance of Australian station life.

== Birth and education ==
Redgrave was born in Newtown in Sydney, the son of Charles Alfred Hurst Redgrave and Mary Jane (née Bellingham). He attended Newington College (1899–1902) as a day-boy while his parents resided in Paddington. In 1900, and again in 1901, he passed the Junior Examination and in 1902 he was appointed as a Prefect at Newington. In March 1902 he passed the Matriculation Examination and went up to the University of Sydney. Redgrave graduated as a Bachelor of Arts three years later in 1905.

== Highfield College ==
From 1907 until 1915, Redgrave was the proprietor and headmaster of Highfield College at Turramurra. The school was at 51 Ku-ring-gai Avenue and his brother, Wilfred Harold Redgrave, ran the junior school. Advertising for the school said:
(a) An ideal home for young boys, with a mother's care, and best of food, and every comfort.
(b) Primary and secondary education, with the individual attention of graduate masters.
(c) Specially equipped classrooms, dormitories, and playing fields, in a fine healthy climate. On its closure in 1915 the building was demolished and redeveloped with a new home in 1917.

== Marriage and children ==
In 1911 he married Ruby Ella Bird at St Leonards. The union produced two sons, Geoffrey Alfred (born 1912) and Ronald Leslie (born 1913).

== Later life ==
From 1923 until 1943 Redgrave lived at Bellingara, 109 Copeland Road Beecroft. He then moved to Oura via Wagga Wagga, New South Wales, and he died in Wagga in 1956.

== Publications ==
- Gwen: a romance of Australian Station life (1913)
- Feathered favourites: a booklet of bird verse (1932)
- Scatch Cock: a booklet of the bright birds of our bushland pictured in colour and rhyme for children (1933)
- Little bungalows: a practical handbook for the homemaker (1937)
