= Sailors Home Sydney =

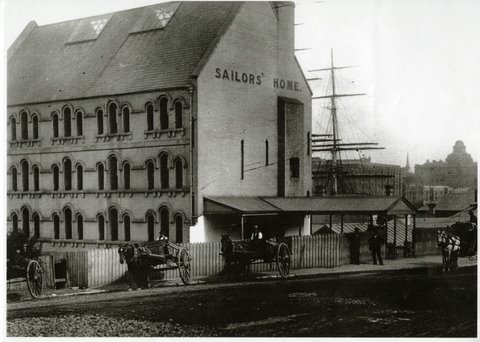
- Sailors Home Sydney
- Interactive map of the Sailors Home Sydney area

General information
- Location: The Rocks, 106 George Street, Sydney, Australia
- Coordinates: 33°51′31″S 151°12′33″E

Sailors' Home Sydney is a building once used by seamen in Sydney, Australia. Sailors used the building for on-shore accommodation until the early 1970s.

== History ==
In 1859, a provisional committee of citizens was formed with the object of building a Sailors' Home in Sydney to provide them with comfortable accommodation while the seamen were on shore. In 1860, land in George Street North in the Rocks area of Sydney was designated as a suitable site. The original 1860s building was designed by William E. Kemp, of Weaver & Kemp, who later worked in the Colonial Architect's office. It is one of the earliest Sydney examples of the Romanesque Revival style. Construction began in 1863.

The home opened its doors in February 1865. Naval personnel lodged there until 1891 when the Royal Naval House, with accommodation for 300, opened in nearby Grosvenor Street.

In 1925, Spain & Cosh, thanks to an endowment from William Carss, (Note: See Carss Cottage.) designed a new wing in the interwar free classical architectural style.

Sailors' Home relocated in the 1970s. The building was converted into the Marionette Theatre during the following decade, and in the early 1990s became The Rocks Heritage and Information Centre. At this time, it was largely restored to its late 19th-century form, with two levels of internal galleries, which was originally split into 3-by-3-metre accommodation for sailors.

Since the 1970s the building has been owned and managed by the NSW Government, most recently Placemaking NSW.
