= Turramurra =

- Suburb
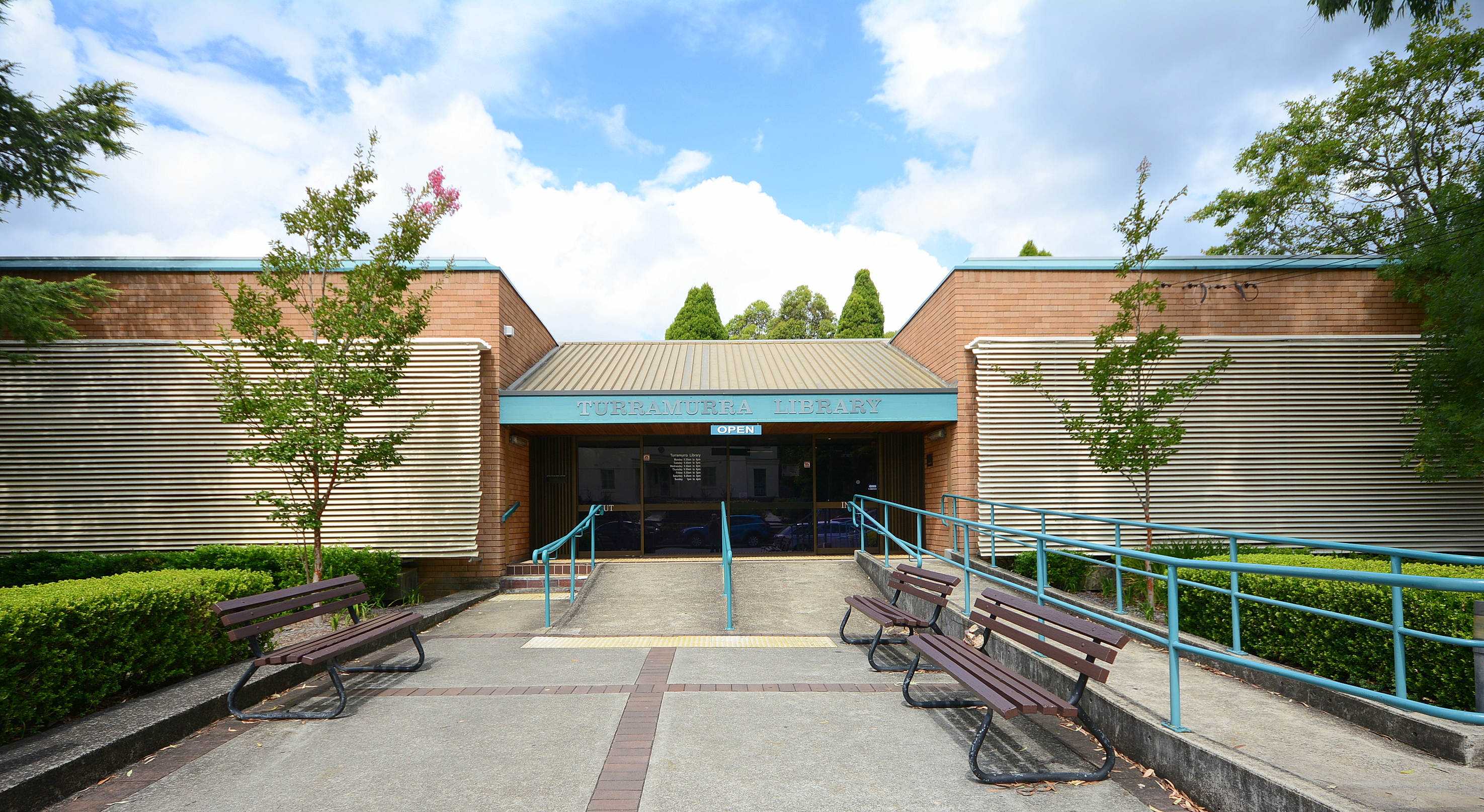
- Turramurra Library

- Interactive map of Turramurra
- Country: Australia
- State: New South Wales
- City: Sydney
- LGA: Ku-ring-gai Council
- Location: 17 km (11 mi) north of Sydney
- Established: 1822

Government
  - State electorates: Wahroonga; Davidson
  - Federal division: Bradfield

Area
  - Total: 6.13 km^{2} (2.37 sq mi)
- Elevation: 179 m (587 ft)

Population
  - Total: 12,850 (SAL 2021)
- Postcode: 2074
Suburbs around Turramurra
Wahroonga	Warrawee	North Turramurra
Warrawee	Turramurra	St Ives
South Turramurra	West Pymble	Pymble

Turramurra is a suburb on the Upper North Shore of Sydney, in the state of New South Wales, Australia. It is located 16 kilometres (10 mi) north-west of the Sydney central business district, in the local government area of Ku-ring-gai Council. It shares the postcode of 2074 with the adjacent suburbs of North Turramurra, South Turramurra and Warrawee.

== History ==
Turramurra is an Aboriginal word which is thought to mean either high hill, big hill, high place, or small watercourse. The Aboriginal reference of high hill covered the range from Pymble to Turramurra.

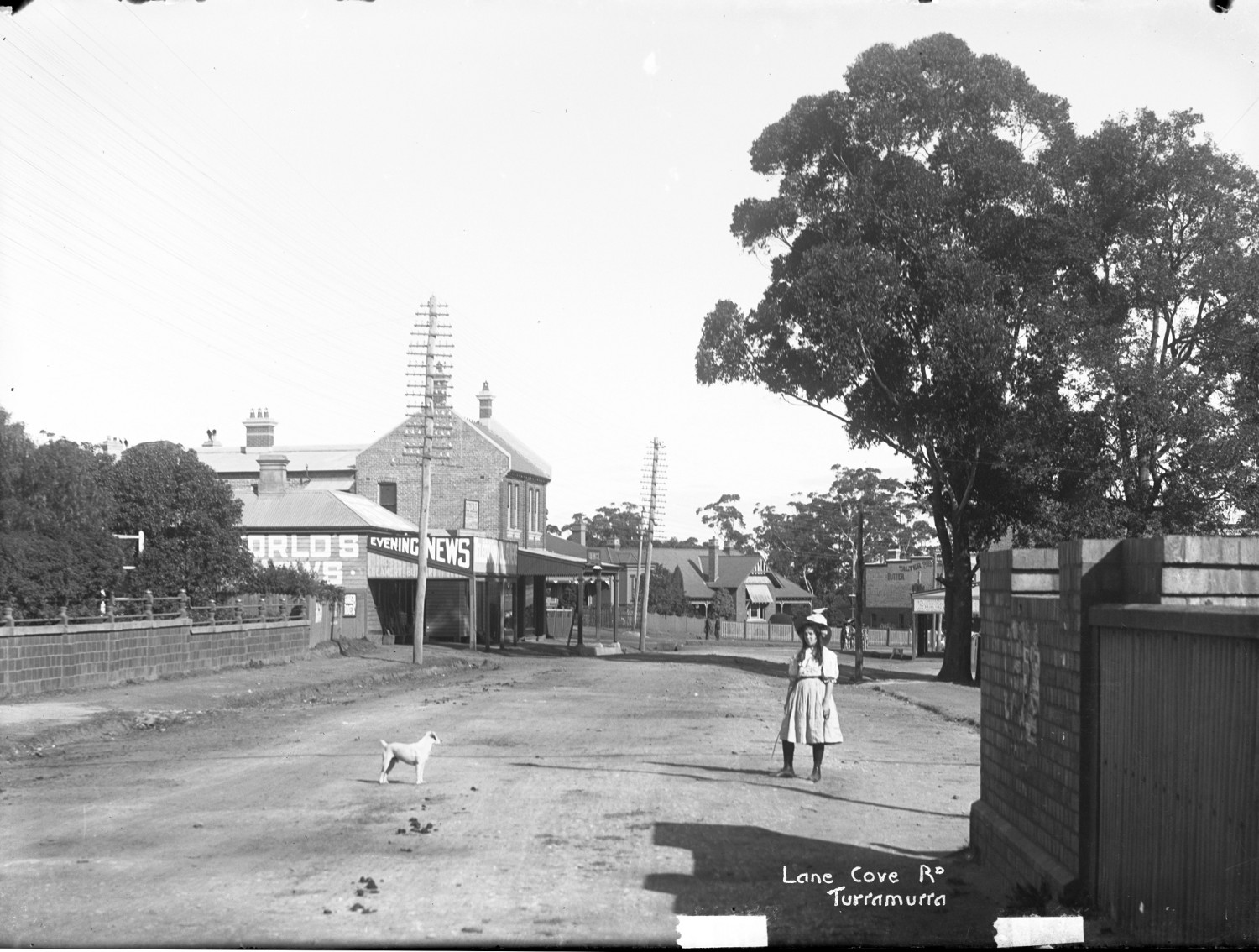
Turramurra from Lane Cove Road, 1908

One of the early local landmarks was Ingleholme, a two-storey Federation Queen Anne home in Boomerang Street. It was designed by John Sulman (1849–1934) as his own home and built c. 1896. The house was part of the Presbyterian Ladies' College (now the Pymble Ladies' College) until 1977 and was added to the New South Wales State Heritage Register on 2 April 1999; and is on the (now defunct) Register of the National Estate as a notable example of Sulman's style. The Indian born diplomat Sir Henry Braddon's home was "Rohini", previously situated at the end of Rohini Street.

Turramurra Post Office opened on 16 August 1890.

St Andrew's in Kissing Point Road is an example of the Federation Carpenter Gothic style. In 1932, Lewy Pattinson, founder of Soul Patts, gave the Presbyterian Church in NSW the land for Mission Hall, at what is now 106 Kissing Point Road. In 1936, ownership was transferred by Pattinson to St Margaret's Presbyterian Church, Turramurra.

A Turramurra East Post Office opened on 1 May 1959 and closed in 1993. The Turramurra North Post Office opened on 1 September 1953.

North Turramurra and South Turramurra became separate suburbs on 5 August 1994.

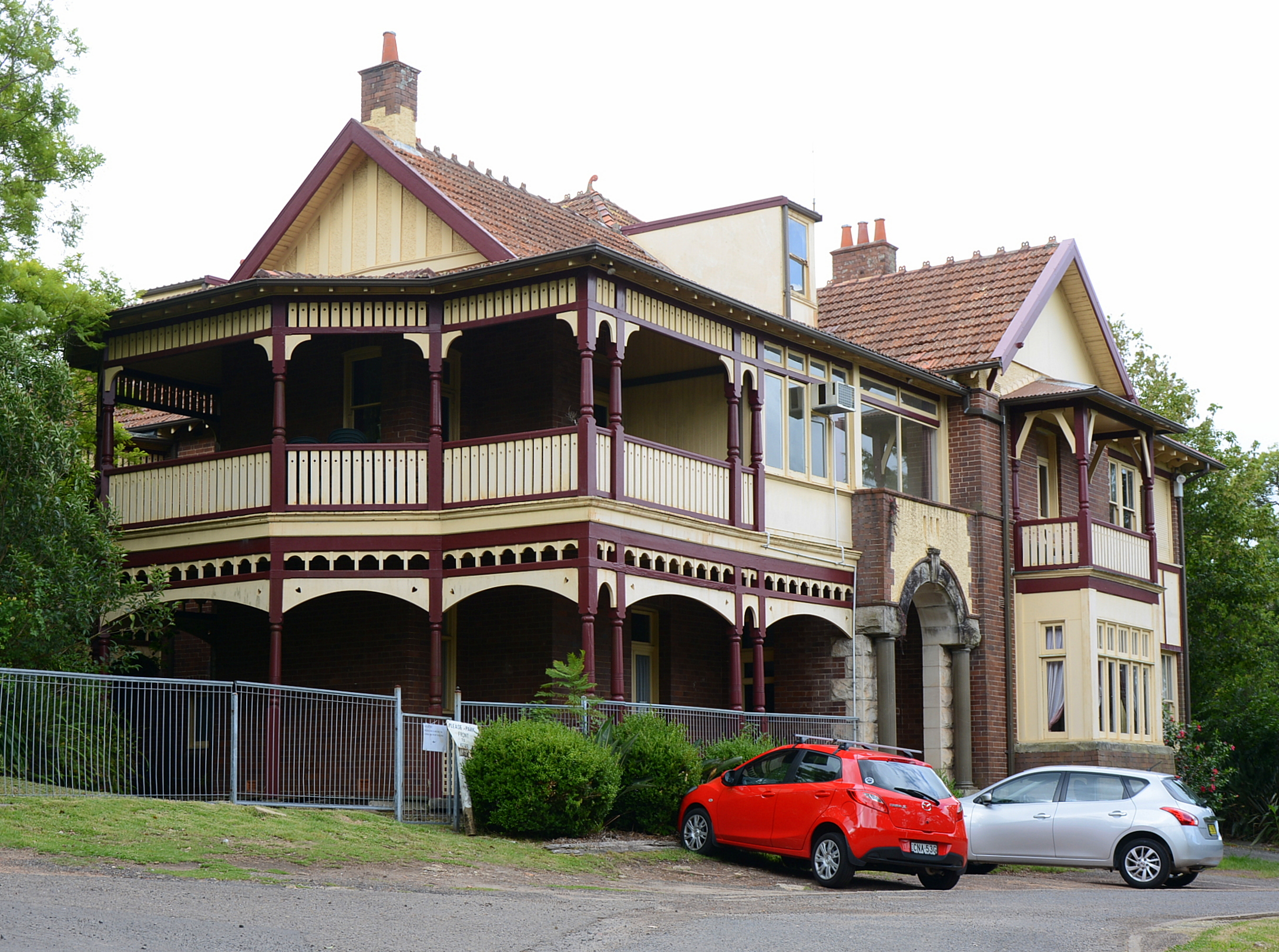
The Hillview gueshouse, part of the Hillview estate

=== Hillview ===
The Hillview estate, situated on the Pacific Highway, started circa 1890 with a modest Federation cottage facing the highway. Later, the owner realised the commercial potential of the site, with its sweeping views, and built a grand, two-storey Federation home at the rear, to be used as a guesthouse, circa 1913. A large, six-car garage with a dwelling above it was added at the western end of the site in 1915. The estate was later leased out to Ku Ring Gai Hospital, Hornsby, to be used as the Hillview Community Health Centre. The entire estate is heritage-listed.

=== Cooinoo ===
The world-famous guest house, "Cooinoo" was situated on Kissing Point Road, only 300m from the Turramurra train station. It was built for William James Adams, heir to the Tattersalls fortune, and was used as a private residence until it became a genteel boarding house - described in 1931 as "the most notable guest house on the picturesque north shore line" by The Home magazine. It was 6 acres with a two story Edwardian-style brick house and exterior cottages to accommodate about 60 guests and a large live-in staff. It was at one point run by Miss Jean Murray, who at the time was already running the nearby "Hillview" estate. She sold it in 1929 for £30,000 to George Thompson. It was later sold to Stan Delaney around 1947. Cooinoo Guest house was demolished in the 1970s to build units.

== Heritage listings ==
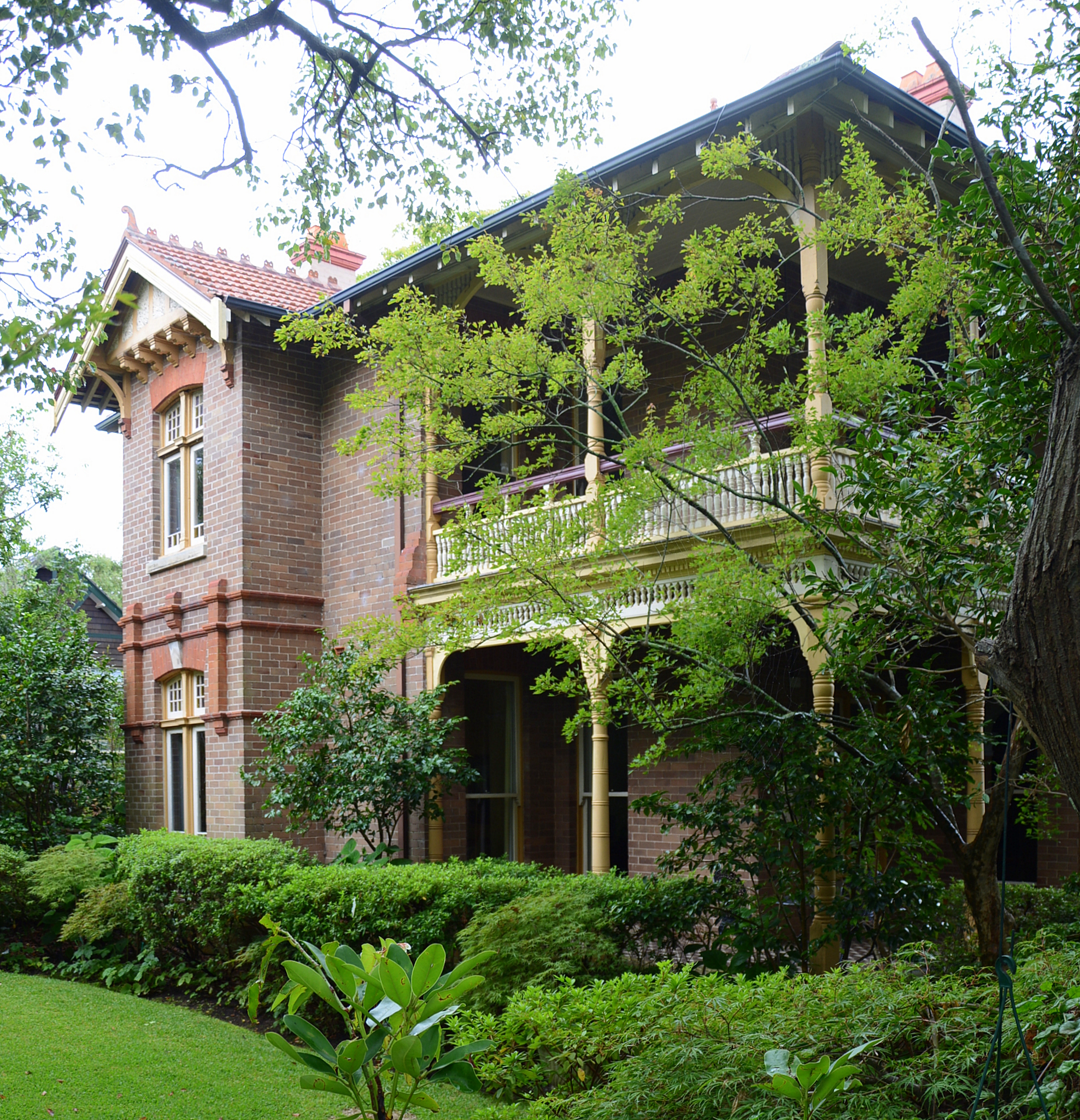
Federation home in Turramurra

Turramurra has a number of heritage-listed sites, including:

- 17 Boomerang Street: Ingleholme
- 43 Ku-Ring-Gai Avenue: Cossington (Turramurra)

== Centres of worship ==
- Guru Nanak Foundation Gurudwara
- Sydney Sungrak Baptist Church
- St James Turramurra
- Turramurra Uniting Church
- Turramurra Community Baptist Church

== Transport ==
The Pacific Highway is a major arterial road in Turramurra. Turramurra railway station is on the North Shore railway line. CDC NSW buses run services from the railway station to local residential areas and schools.

== Commercial area ==
The largest commercial area in Turramurra is located along the Pacific Highway and Rohini Street, beside Turramurra railway station. This shopping precinct includes real-estate agents, fruit-markets, banks, bakeries, a musical instrument store, petrol station, Turramurra Arcade. There are two supermarkets in this vicinity. There is Turramurra Plaza with shops, such as shoe-repairs, a pool store, a patisserie and a tobacconist. A Coles supermarket is located behind Turramurra Station, on Ray Street, near the public library. Turramurra Masonic Centre is located along the Pacific Highway.

Princes Street shops are located in East Turramurra, on the corner of Princes Street and Bannockburn Road, near to Pymble Public School. Princes Street shops include a fine wine store, veterinary hospital, gift shop, delicatessen, butcher and grocer. Street renovations were completed in late 2013 and opened by Ku Ring Gai Mayor Jennifer Anderson during the annual community fair.

There are shops at South Turramurra on Kissing Point Road including a hairdresser, IGA supermarket, cafe, pizza restaurant, chemist, bakery, post office, BP petrol station and other services.

There is also a shopping village in North Turramurra on Bobbin Head Road which has an IGA supermarket, bakery, post office, newsagent and other facilities.

There are also shops along Eastern Road (between 95 and 105 Eastern Road) which has an IGA supermarket, dry cleaners, BWS liquor, bakery, butchers, greengrocer, pharmacy, florist and independent petrol station. There is a proposal currently underway for a Harris Farm market to be constructed at 105 Eastern Road (the site of GDR automotives) and part of the adjoining nursery. A proposal to rezone and develop an Aldi supermarket was rejected in 2016.

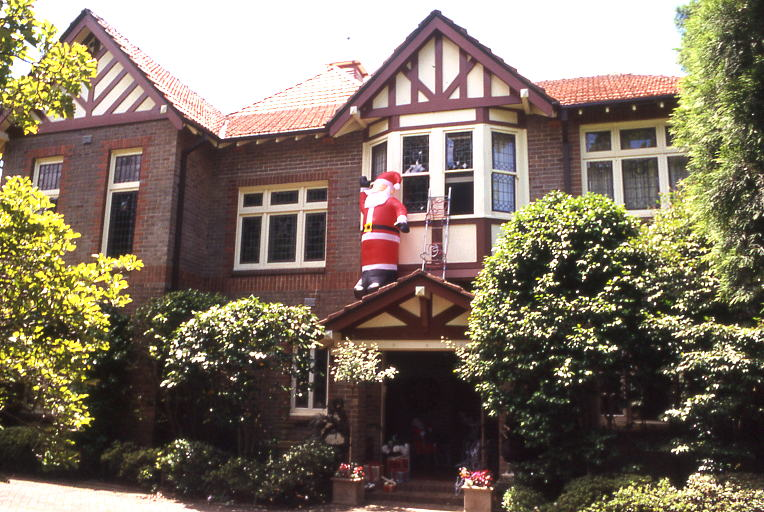
Ingleholme, Boomerang Street, is an example of the Federation Queen Anne style and the former home of architect John Sulman

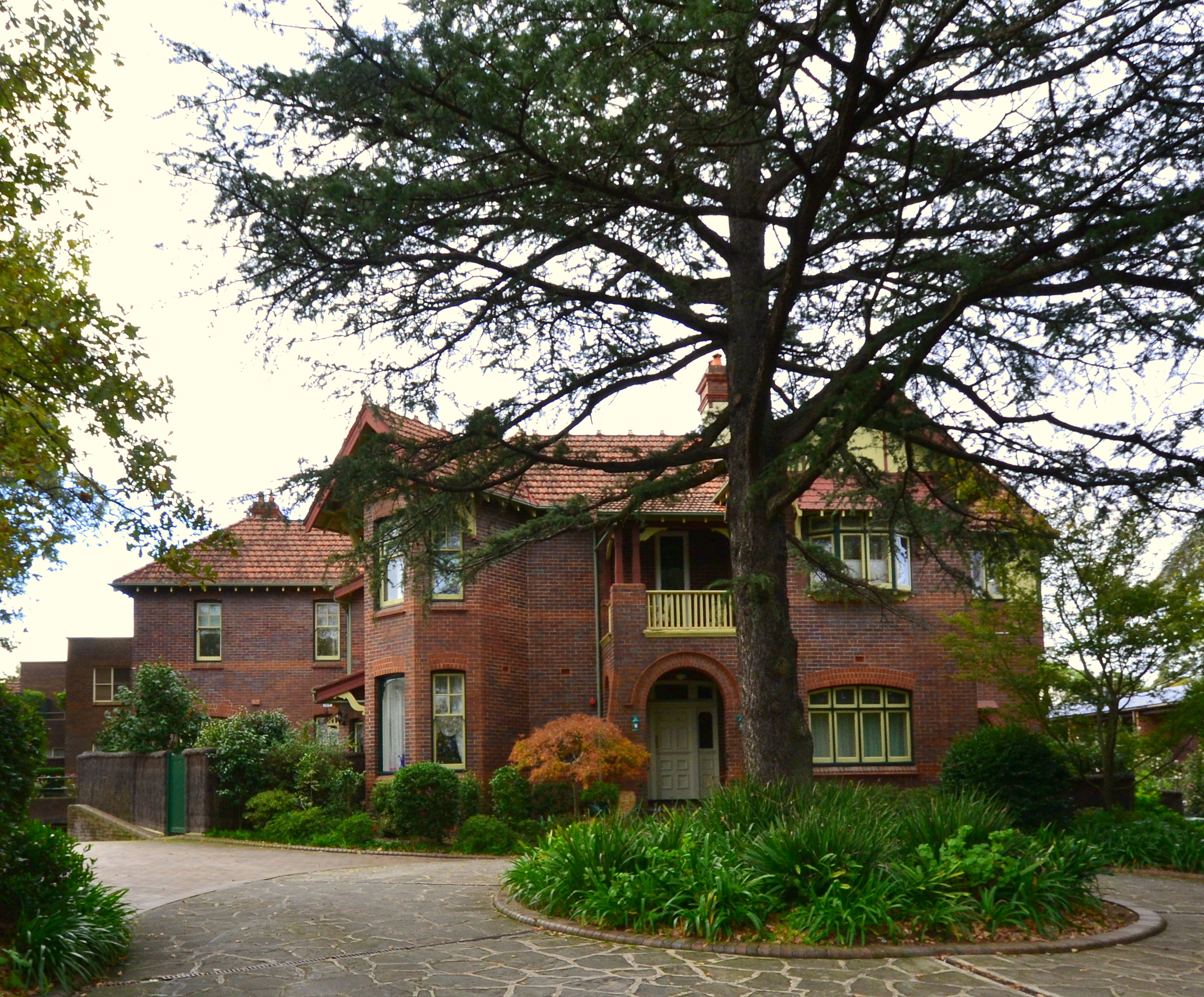
Cherrywood, a heritage-listed Federation house on the Pacific Highway.

== Geography ==
Turramurra is a hilly suburb approximately 170 metres above sea level. On the south-eastern boundary, bordering with Pymble is Sheldon Forest, which has some of the best preserved examples of blue gums and turpentine high forest.

North Turramurra is a separate suburb, north of Burns Road. Bobbin Head Road runs in a north–south direction through North Turramurra and then into the Ku-ring-gai National Park. The North Turramurra shops are located next to North Turramurra Public School. Further north are Ku-ring-gai Chase National Park and Ku-ring-gai Creative Arts High School.

South Turramurra is a separate suburb, south of the Comenarra Parkway and centred on Kissing Point Road. South Turramurra is bordered by Lane Cove National Park start of the Great North Walk. Turramurra High School is in South Turramurra.

East Turramurra is an unofficial urban locality of Turramurra. It is situated in the area of Turramurra east of Bobbin Head Road. It has a small shopping area called Princes Street shops.

=== Weather ===
According to the Bureau of Meteorology, Turramurra was the wettest suburb in Sydney in the years 2007, 2008, 2010, 2011, 2012 and 2014.

== Education ==
- Turramurra High School (South Turramurra)
- Turramurra Public School
- Warrawee Public School

== Sport and recreation ==
Ku-ring-gai Council has several sporting fields in the area, including a large tennis and netball facility at the end of Canoon Road and Kent Oval which has children's play equipment and tennis courts. Tennis courts and a basketball court are located at Hamilton Park. Irish Town Grove is a park located behind Princes Street shops in East Turramurra. Karuah Oval is a large oval located next to Karuah Road. Turramurra Memorial Park is a large park with an oval, four tennis courts (two grass and two hard), two table tennis tables, a running track, children's play area, outdoor exercise area and public toilets.

Comenarra Park on the Comenarra Parkway has cricket and a soccer field. It also has bushwalking tracks leading into the Lane Cove National Park.

Scouting groups in Turramurra take part in a range of outdoor, social and community service activities:

- 1st Turramurra Scout Group has active programs for boys and girls aged from 8-11 (Cub Scouts), 11-15 (Scouts), through to young men and women 15-17 (Venturer Scouts) and an associated Rover Crew (Turramurra Rovers) for ages 18-25.
- 2nd Turramurra Scout Group has active programs for boys and girls aged from 5-7 (Joey Scouts), 8-11 (Cub Scouts), 11-15 (Scouts), through to young men and women 15-17 (Venturer Scouts) and an associated Rover Crew (Kissing Point Rovers) for ages 18-25.

Three teams which compete in the Northern Suburbs Football Association (NSFA) association football League have a venue or venues in Turramurra as their home ground/s. Both founded in 1957, Kissing Point Football Club (KPFC) is based at Auluba Oval in South Turramurra, while North Turramurra Football Club (NTFC) operates from Samuel King Oval in North Turramurra. The third team, Turramurra United Football Club (TUFC), was formed in 2017 when Bannockburn Rovers FC and Wahroonga Tigers FC merged, and as a result TUFC has three home grounds: Bannockburn Oval (Pymble), North Turramurra Recreation Area, and Karuah Park.

The local Kissing Point Cricket Club fields a number of senior and junior sides in the Hornsby, Ku-ring-gai & Hills District Cricket Association. The club was established in 1961.

In Rugby league, Turramurra is represented by the North Sydney Bears, officially the North Sydney District Rugby League Football Club. The NSDRLFC (Who haven’t competed in the NRL since 1999, although there have been ongoing efforts restore the club to the top flight) is the only team without NRL representation to have a Junior Rugby League District, and teams in the District compete in the same competition with clubs in the Districts of represented by the Manly Warringah Sea Eagles. Turramurra is represented by the Ku-ring-gai Cubs, who are in North Sydney’s District, and their primary home is Memorial Park in Turramurra

== Population ==
=== Demographics ===
At the 2021 census, the suburb of Turramurra recorded a population of 12,850 people. Of these:

- Age distribution: The median age was 43 years, compared to the national median of 38 years. Children aged under 15 years made up 19.0% of the population (the national average was 18.2%) and people aged 65 years and over made up 19.7% of the population (the national average was 17.2%).
- Ethnic diversity : 58.9% of people were born in Australia, compared to the national average of 66.9%; the next most common countries of birth were China (excluding Special Administrative Regions and Taiwan) 8.4%, England 5.5%, India 2.7%, South Africa 2.7%, and Hong Kong 2.1%. 68.6% of people only spoke English at home; other languages spoken at home included Mandarin 10.3%, Cantonese 4.0%, Korean 2.5%, Persian (excluding Dari) 1.3%, and Hindi 1.1%
- Religion : The most common responses for religion were No Religion 40.3%, Catholic 17.7%, Anglican 15.9%, and Uniting Church 4.7%; a further 3.9% of respondents elected not to disclose their religion.
- Finances: The median household weekly income was $3,046, compared to the national median of $1,746. This difference is also reflected in real estate, with the median mortgage payment being $3,484 per month, compared to the national median of $1,863.
- Housing: The majority (68.1%) of occupied private dwellings were separate houses, 27.2% were flats, units or apartments, 4.6% were semi-detached, and there were 0.1% of other types of dwellings. The average household size was 2.8 people.

=== Notable residents ===
- Trevor Allan, captain of Australian rugby, lived at Canoon Rd in a house called Murrayfield named for the ground on which he made his debut
- Faith Bandler, Aboriginal activist
- Eric Campbell, Leader of the New Guard lived at Boongala, 28 Ku-ring-gai Avenue
- Grace Cossington Smith 20th-century Australian painter lived in Ku-ring-gai Avenue, Turramurra most of her life
- Shane Gould, gold medallist swimmer at 1972 Summer Olympics (Munich), attended Turramurra High School
- Stuart Inder, journalist, editor and specialist in Pacific Islands affairs
- Kamahl, singer
- Gail Kelly, businesswoman
- John Kerr, former Governor-General of Australia, lived on the corner of Kissing Point Road and Catalpa Crescent for part of his life.
- Gretel Killeen, host of Big Brother Australia and author, was born in the suburb and spent some of her childhood at Fairlawn Avenue
- Chris Lilley, actor and comedian famous for Summer Heights High, grew up in Turramurra
- Charles Mackerras, orchestral conductor, lived in Turramurra from age 7 to age 21 (1933 to 1947).
- Gail Neall gold medallist swimmer at 1972 Summer Olympics (Munich), attended Turramurra High School
- Barry O'Farrell, former Premier of New South Wales 2011–14, has lived with his family in Turramurra since 2011 or 2012. Until his retirement, O'Farrell had represented the electoral district of Ku-ring-gai which includes part of Turramurra
- Leslie Alfred Redgrave, author of the 1913 novel Gwen: a romance of Australian station life and proprietor headmaster of Highfield College at 51 Ku-ring-gai Avenue, Turramurra, from 1907 until 1915.
- Frank Riethmuller, German–Australian rose-breeder, boarded for seven years at "Wychwood" in Ku-Ring-Gai Avenue, in 1937 made a house and garden containing many original roses at 21 Eastern Road
- Tony Roche, former coach of world number-one tennis player, Roger Federer
- Ken Rosewall, tennis great, became a resident in 1960
- Dave Sharma, Senator and former diplomat, grew up there and owned a home on Kissing Point Rd
- George Szekeres, mathematician
- Barrie Unsworth, former Premier of New South Wales 1986–88, lived in Geoffrey Street
- Charles Weston, horticulturalist
- Gough Whitlam (1916-2014), 21st Prime Minister of Australia, serving from 1972 to 1975
- Prof Sir Brian Wellingham Windeyer (1904-1994), born in Turramurra; Professor of Therapeutic Radiology at Middlesex Hospital Medical School, University of London 1942–69; Vice-Chancellor, University of London (1969–72).
