= John Sulman =

Australian architect

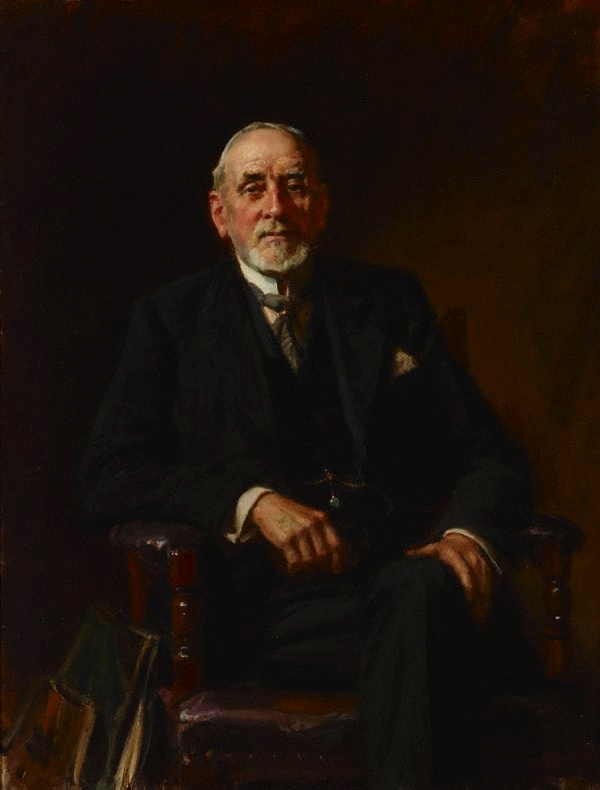
- Portrait of John Sulman by John Longstaff, 1931
- Born: 29 August 1849; Greenwich, England
- Died: 18 August 1934 (aged 84); Sydney, Australia
- Education: Greenwich Proprietary School
- Occupation: Architect
- Children: 3 (including Florence Sulman)

Sir John Sulman (29 August 1849 – 18 August 1934) was an Australian architect. Born in Greenwich, England, he emigrated to Sydney in 1885. From 1921 to 1924 he was chairman of the Federal Capital Advisory Committee and influenced the development of Canberra.

== Early life ==
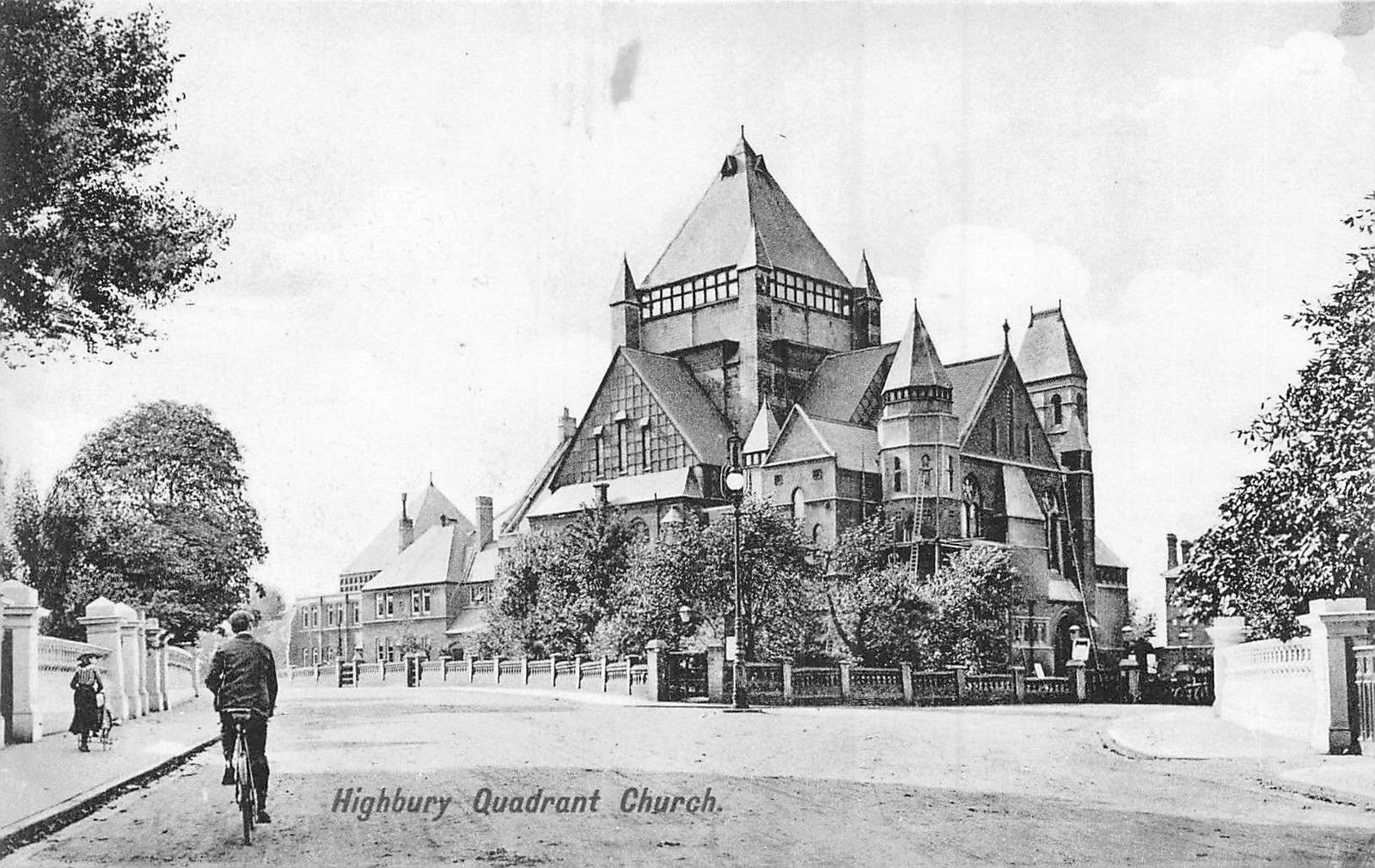
Congregational Сhurch and schools, Highbury Quadrant, London (1880-2, demolished in 1957)

Born in Greenwich, England, Sulman was educated at the Greenwich Proprietary School and in 1863 passed the Oxford junior examination. After his family moved to Croydon next year, he was articled to Thomas Allom, a London architect. He learned the use of oils and watercolour, and executed perspective drawings for Sir George Gilbert Scott.

Following illness, Sulman resumed work in London in 1868. While articled to H. R. Newton, he attended classes at the Architectural Association and at the Royal Academy of Arts, winning the Pugin travelling scholarship in 1871. After travelling through England and Western Europe Sulman began practising as an architect in London and designed among other buildings a large number of churches, including one of his best known Highbury Congregational Church. An associate of the Royal Institute of British Architects in 1872 (fellow, 1883), Sulman designed the Congregational Church(now the United Reformed Church) at Caterham, Surrey, where he was the son-in-law of one of the deacons. The first wedding there was his own, to Sarah Clark Redgate (d. 1888) on 15 April 1875, after which the couple moved to Bromley, Kent where he lectured on applied art and formed the Nineteenth Century Art Society. John and Sarah had three children, a son Arthur (1882–1971) and daughters Florence (1876–1965) and Edith (1877–1907). They moved to Sydney, Australia on account of Sarah's tuberculosis. They arrived on 13 August 1885 and settled at Parramatta, but Sarah survived little more than three years and died on 31 December 1888.

== Career in Australia ==
In Sydney, Sulman briefly formed a partnership with C. H. E. Blackmann from 1886 to 1888, then from 1889 formed the practice Sulman & Power with Joseph Porter Power. The partnership designed many notable buildings in Sydney, country NSW, and in other capital cities, including large office buildings, churches, colleges, hospitals, and houses for prominent people. His residential and college designs of the late 1880s shows early influence of the Queen Anne or Arts & Crafts (later known as Federation), while his commercial designs were Palladian or Baroque, and his churches Gothic or Romanesque. Many of the larger city buildings have been demolished. Notable designs included the Italianate/Federation style Thomas Walker Convalescent Hospital, Concord, Sydney (1892), the Palladian style A.M.P. buildings in Brisbane (1886) and the Edwardian Baroque style Melbourne example (1906) (both demolished), the grand Baroque style (Colonial) Mutual Life Association building, Sydney (1889, demolished), The Armidale School in northern NSW (1893) in an inventive Federation style, the Richardson Romanesque former Sargood Warehouse (1899) (now Ross House), and several suburban churches such as the Romanesque St Andrew's Manly (1890). Between 1887 and 1912 Sulman was P. N. Russell lecturer in architecture at the University of Sydney. After 1908 he retired from active practice to some extent to develop his interest in town-planning. From 1916 to 1927 he was the Vernon lecturer in town planning at the University of Sydney. In 1921 he published his An Introduction to the Study of Town Planning in Australia.

Sulman published his plan for a Federal capital city in his book The Federal Capital in 1908. However, his plan was apparently not entered in the Federal Capital Competition; it was certainly not shortlisted. Sulman became formally involved in the Federal Capital, Canberra in 1921 when he was appointed head of the Federal Capital Advisory Committee. Sulman's alterations to the Griffin plan made the city less like the one Griffin had planned and more in line with some designs aligned with the English garden city movement.

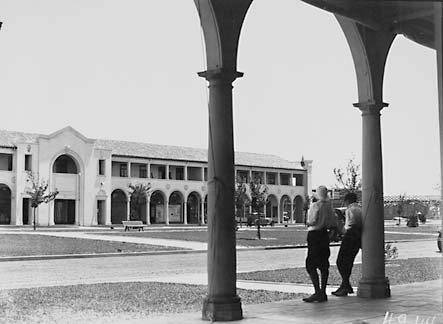
1929 picture of the Sydney Building looking across Northbourne Avenue from the Melbourne Building

The Melbourne and Sydney buildings in Canberra's city centre, Civic, were based on design principles set by Sulman although the design work was finalised by J.H. Kirkpatrick. The buildings were the model which establish the colonnade principle, an important design element throughout Civic.

He was a trustee of the National Art Gallery of New South Wales from 1899 and its president from 1919. The Sir John Sulman Prize for "the best subject/genre painting and/or murals/mural project executed during the two years preceding the [closing] date ..." has been held at the Art Gallery of New South Wales since 1936. It is hosted concurrently with the Archibald Prize, the most prominent Australian art prize, along with the Wynne prize and Dobell art prizes. The prize was established as a bequest by the Sulman family. When initiated the prize was about £100 annually and for the best subject painting or mural decoration by artists resident in Australia.

Sulman also endowed a lectureship in aeronautics at the University of Sydney in memory of his son Geoffrey who was killed during World War I while serving with the Flying Corps.

John Sulman's extensive collection of diaries, sketchbooks, correspondence, manuscripts, drawings and photographs was in the possession of family members for many years, but in 2018 it was lodged and catalogued in the State Library of New South Wales, Sydney. The papers reveal Sulman as a true polymath: architect, artist, author, educator, town planner, politician, historian, statesman, patriot, commentator, benefactor and polemicist.

== Personal life ==
Sulman married Sarah Clark Redgate on 15 April 1875 at the Congregational Church at Caterham, Surrey. He had designed the church where they married, and theirs was the first wedding held there. They had three children, a son Arthur (1882–1971) and daughters Florence E. (1876–1965) and Edith (1877–1907).

They moved to Sydney, Australia on account of his wife's tuberculosis. They arrived on 13 August 1885 and settled at Parramatta, where his wife died on 31 December 1888.

His parents John (senior) and Martha moved into Addiscombe at Lane Cove Road, Turramurra.

He married again, to Annie Elizabeth Masefield (a relative of John Masefield) at St Luke's Anglican Church, Burwood, on 27 April 1893. His health broke down in 1896, prompting a trip to Europe. When they returned, he turned the cottage he had originally intended for his parents at Boomerang Street, Turramurra into their family home Ingleholme, which developed into a "rambling complex of gables, bays, turrets and chimneys".

Children by this second marriage were Geoffrey, Dorothy Joan (b. 31 January 1896 d. 1971), and Thomas Noel ("Tom", or "Tommy"). Geoffrey enlisted in England and joined the Royal Flying Corps. He died aged 23 in 1917, in a flying accident over England, prior to being qualified for combat duties. Thomas became a racing car driver, and developed the Sulman Singer, and Sulman Park in Bathurst is named after him. He was still racing in 1954. He died in 1970, aged 70. Joan married Bruce Thomas Shallard, MD, and in 1947, moved to Vancouver, B.C. Canada, with their daughters, Barbara (Shallard) Ash, and Meryn (Shallard) Stranahan.

In 1913 John Sulman purchased the magnificent property "Kihilla" at Lawson in the Blue Mountains as a second home; it remained in the family until 1953.

Mrs Sulman was socially active, being a prominent member of such organisations as the Leura and Lawson branches of the Red Cross Society. Florence, usually referred to as "Miss Sulman" was active in the Society of Arts and Crafts of NSW, where she was president 1928–35 and 1951–56) as well as hospital and kindergarten charities and the Women's section of the NSW branch of the Town Planning Association. Florence was author of the two-volume (1913, 1914) Wildflowers of New South Wales.

Sulman retired in 1928 but remained a highly visible presence in civic, art and architectural circles, taking a prominent role in many public debates. He died in Sydney aged 84 years.

Most of the family mentioned here are interred or memorialised at Gore Hill Cemetery.

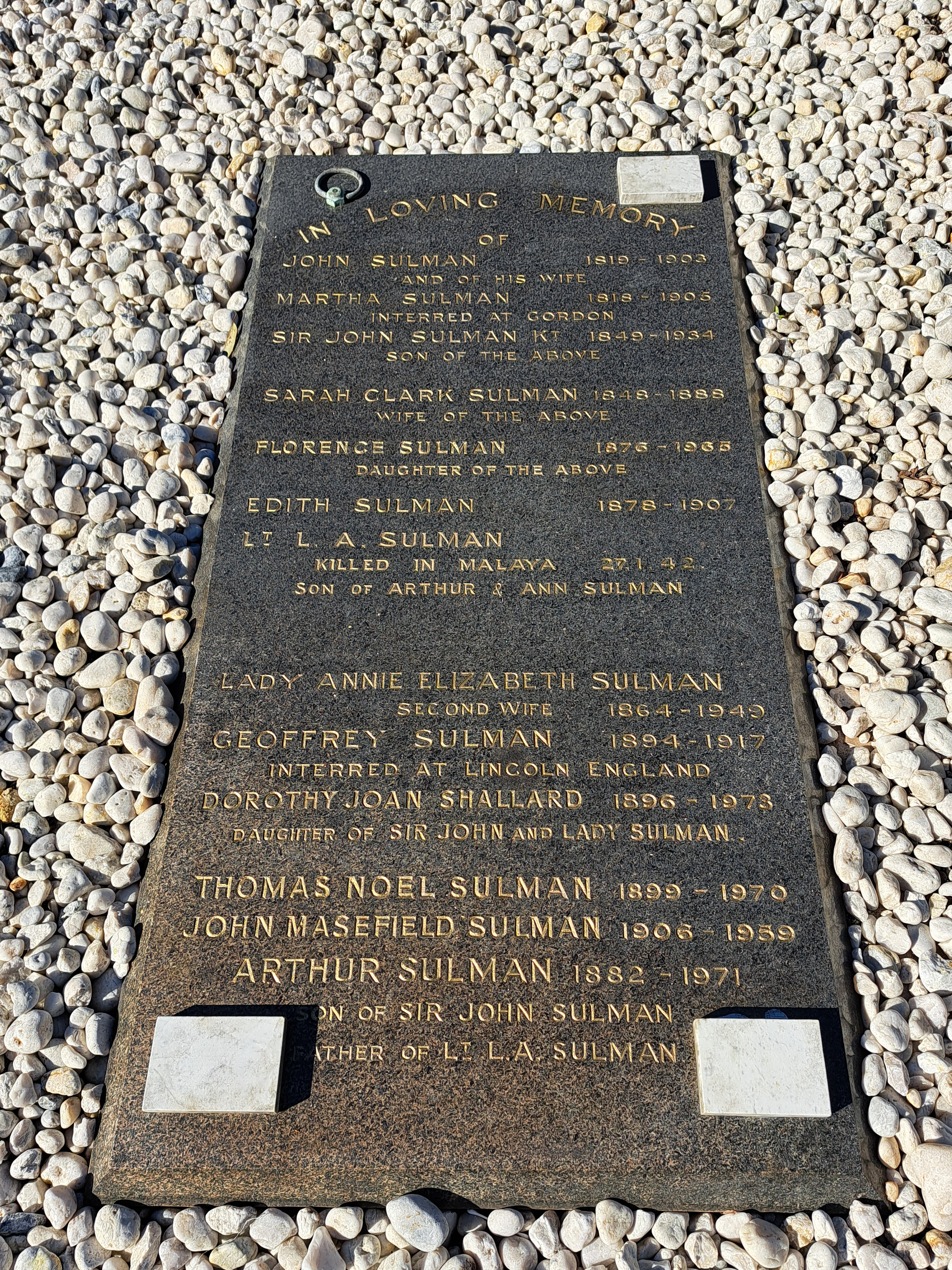
Gravestone of the Sulman family Gore Hill Cemetery Greenwich Sydney

== Recognition ==
He was appointed a Knight Bachelor in the 1924 Birthday Honours.

In 1926, he was elected to the International Housing and Town Planning Congress in Vienna.

His portrait by John Longstaff won the Archibald Prize for 1931.

A highly coveted and prestigious architecture prize, the Sir John Sulman Medal, also known as the Sulman Award, recognises excellence in public architecture in New South Wales, Australia. The medal is awarded annually by the New South Wales Chapter of the Australian Institute of Architects. The medal was first awarded in 1934.

On 2 January 2008 it was announced that a suburb in the future Canberra district of Molonglo would be named Sulman.

== Gallery ==
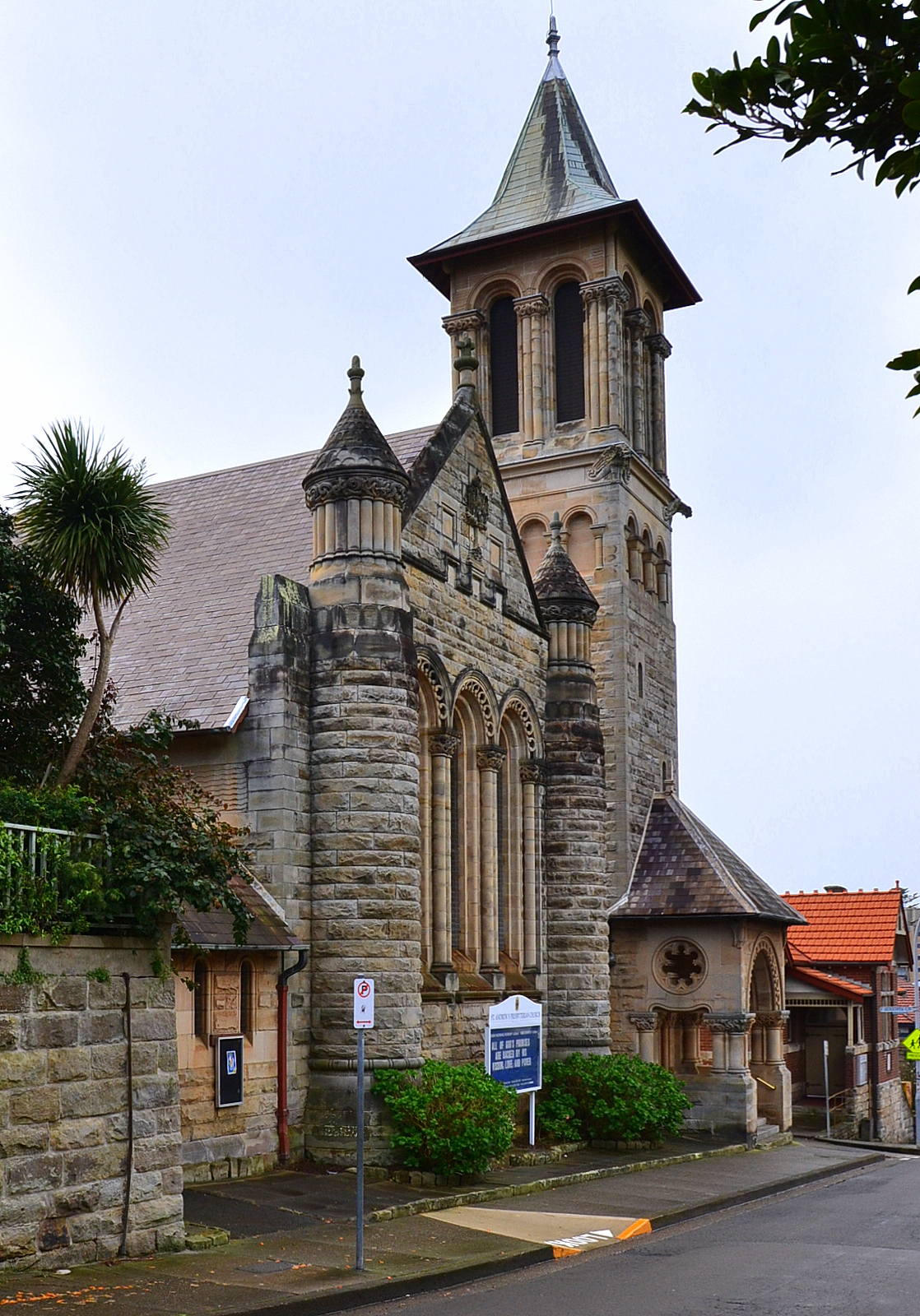
St Andrew's Presbyterian Church, Manly

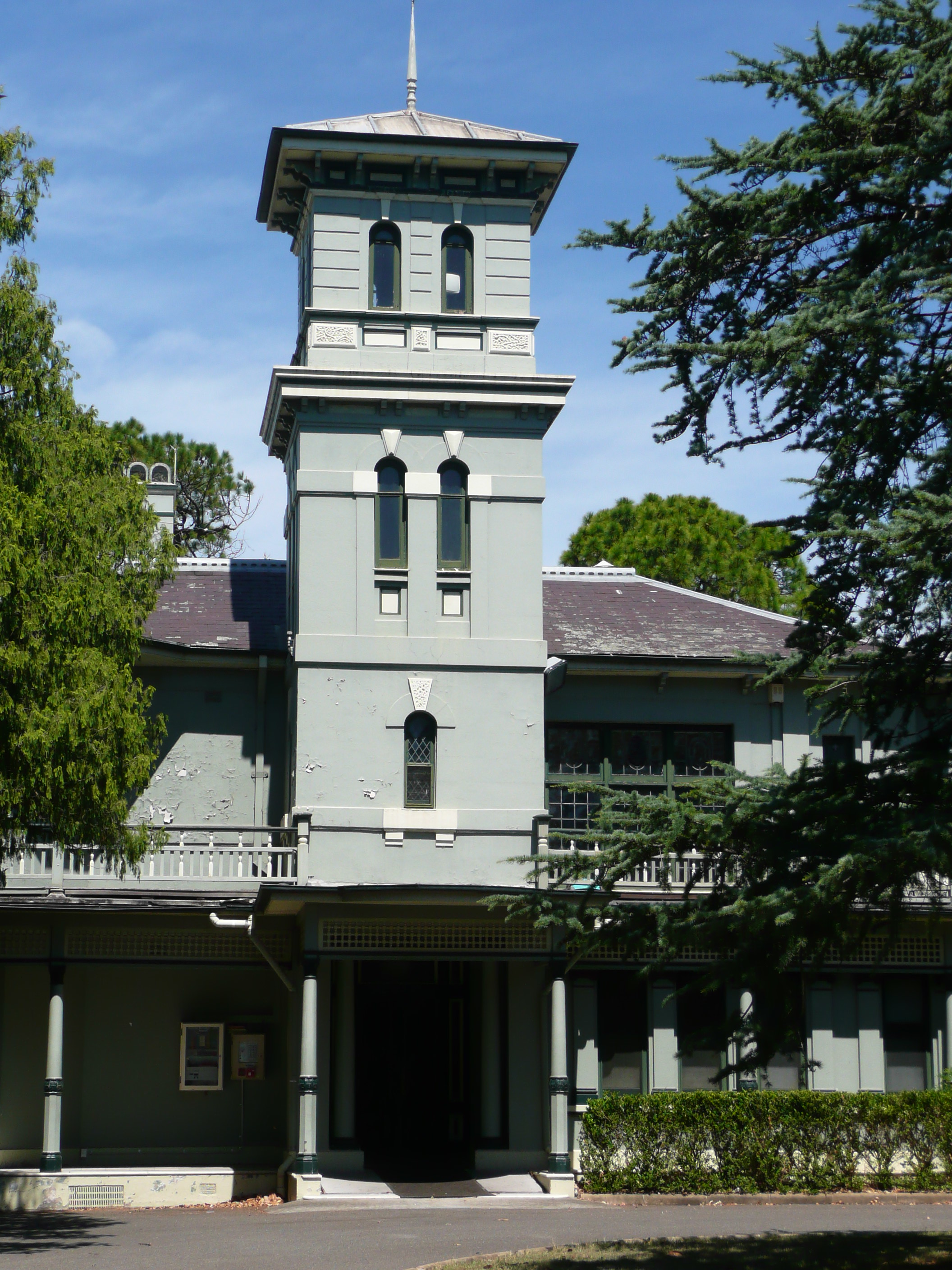
Yaralla Estate, Concord West (extended by Sulman 1893–99)

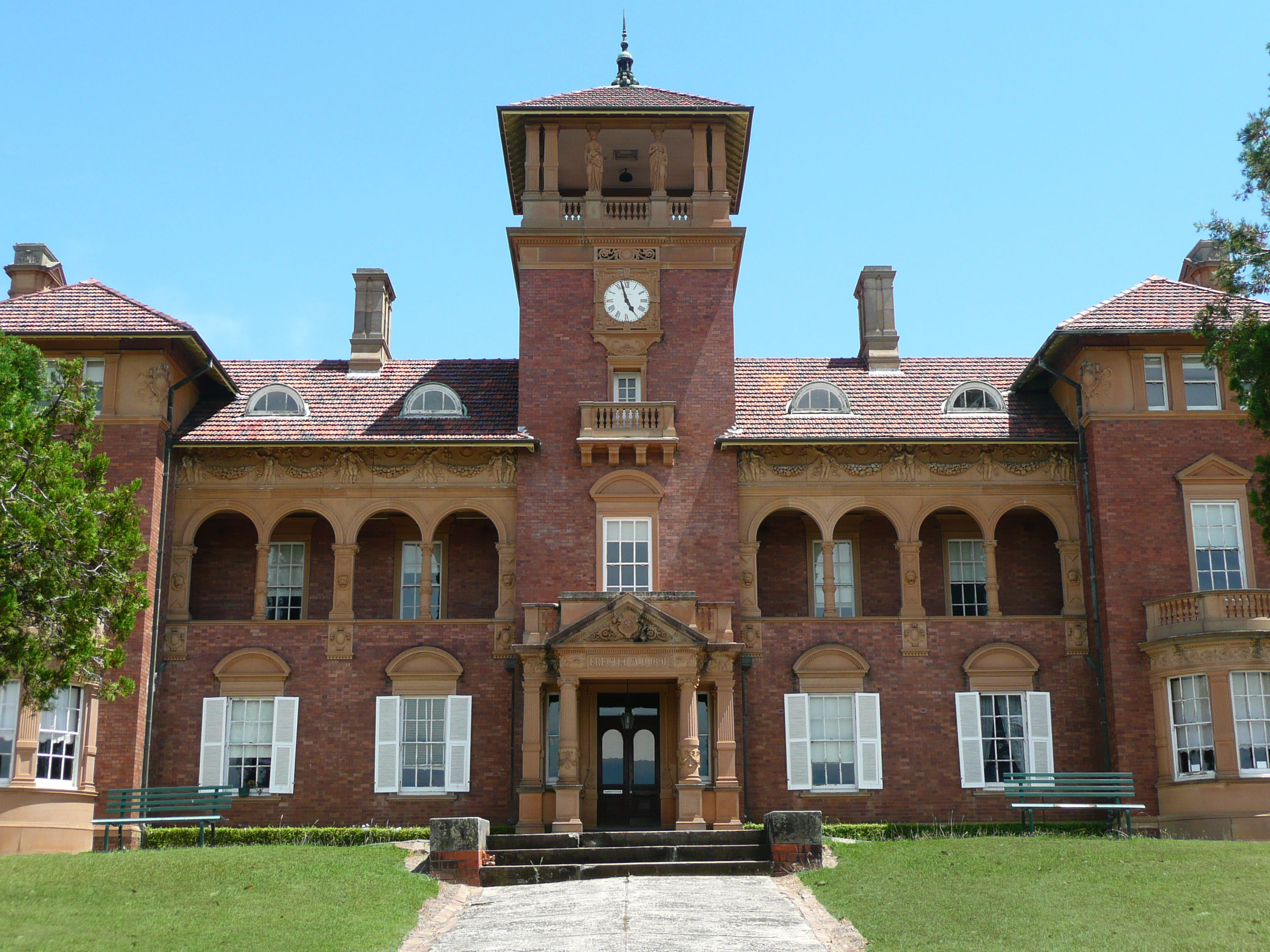
Thomas Walker Convalescent Hospital, Concord West

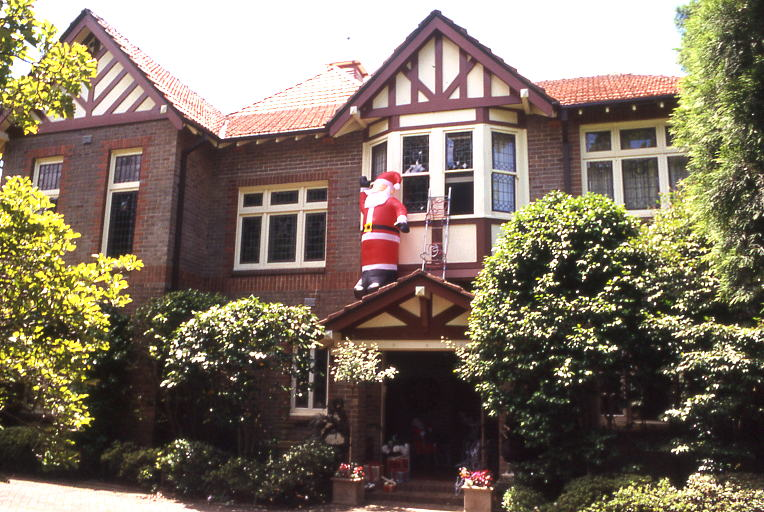
Ingleholme, Turramurra; Sulman's own home, designed by him in Federation Queen Anne style

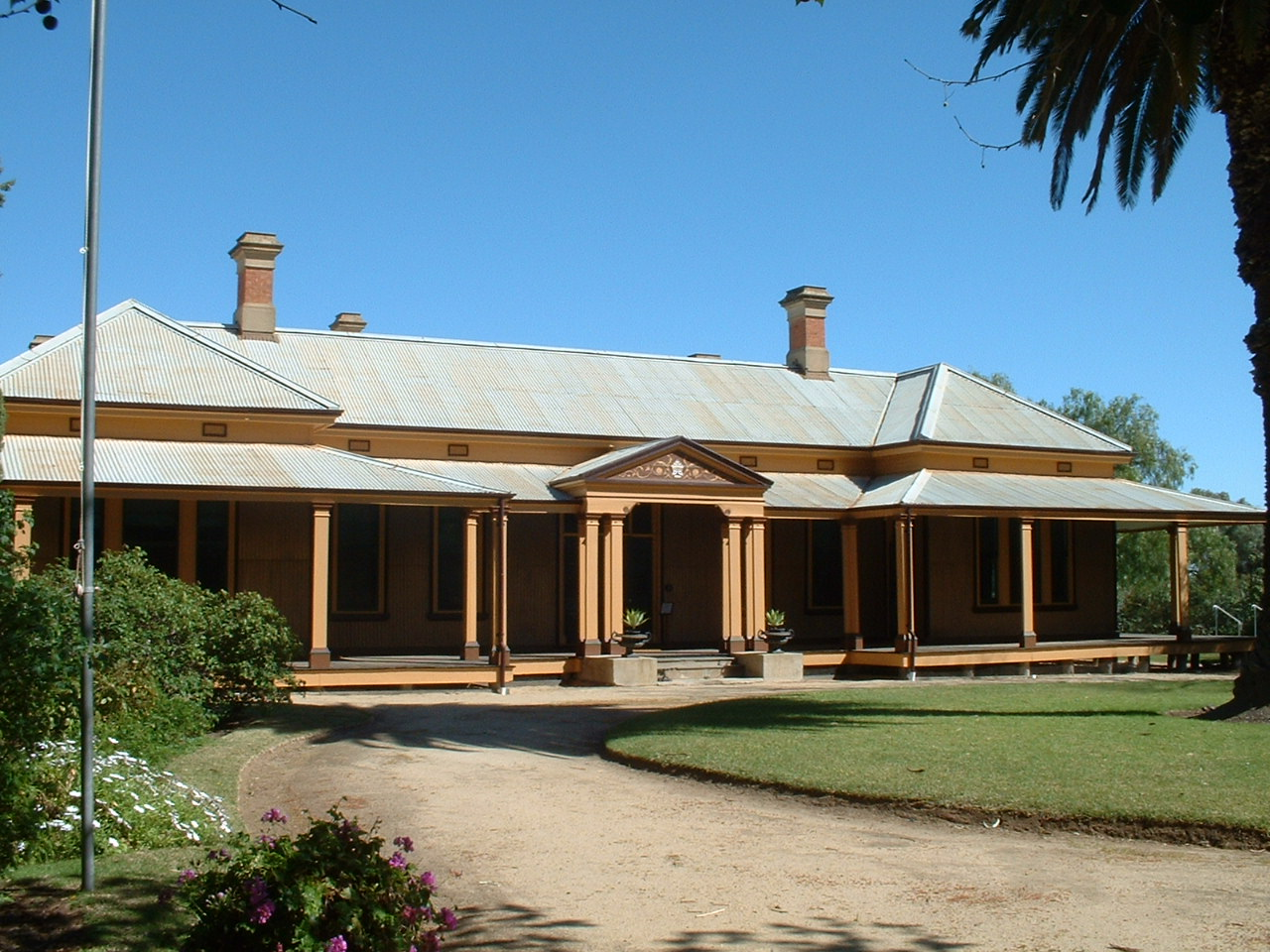
Bishop's Lodge, Hay, New South Wales, built in 1888–89, from corrugated iron

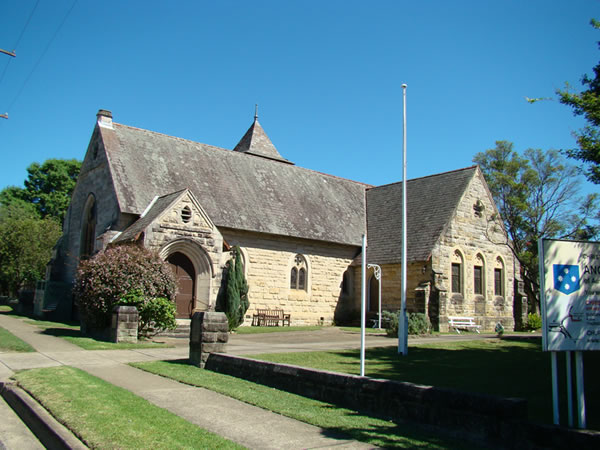
Christ Church Anglican Church, Springwood, built in 1889

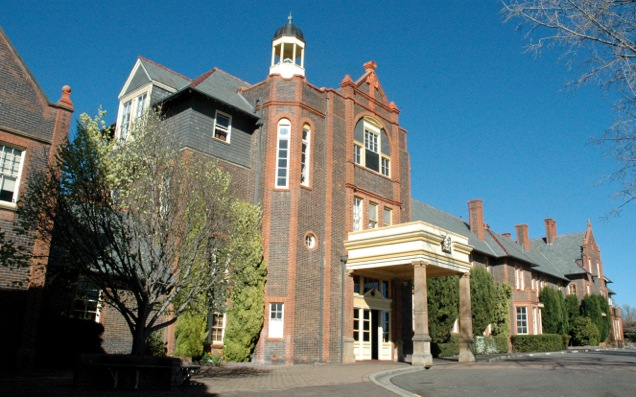
The main building of The Armidale School designed by Sir John Sulman in 1892.

Government offices
Preceded by Sir James Fairfax	President of the Board of Trustees of the Art Gallery of New South Wales; 1919–1934	Succeeded by Sir Philip Whistler Street
