= Mir Kosh =

Village in Pakistan

Coordinates: 28°16′N 69°46′E

Mir Kosh is a village in Ubauro, District Ghotki. The town is notorious for popularizing a method if of extortion wherein bandits and kidnappers lure people by befriending them over the phone using a female voice. The criminal then invites the victim to their location and takes a ransom or leaves them for dead. Most famous among the victims was Muhammad Ramzan, the Additional Home Secretary of Khyber Pakhtunkhuwa. Ramzan was in touch with an anonymous female caller, who, after befriending him, invited him to Ubauro city. Police visited his home and found him missing, highlighting the issue. Ramzan's family received a call demanding a hefty ransom in exchange for his return. Police raided a location in Ghokti, where they found Ramzan and three individuals involved with the so-called "honey pot" scheme. . A young man named Azhar a.k.a Lalo/ Laly son of Allah wadhaio Kosh invented this type of kidnapping which expanded to Sindh, Balochistan, and Punjab.
