= Sydney Trades Hall =

Building in Sydney, Australia

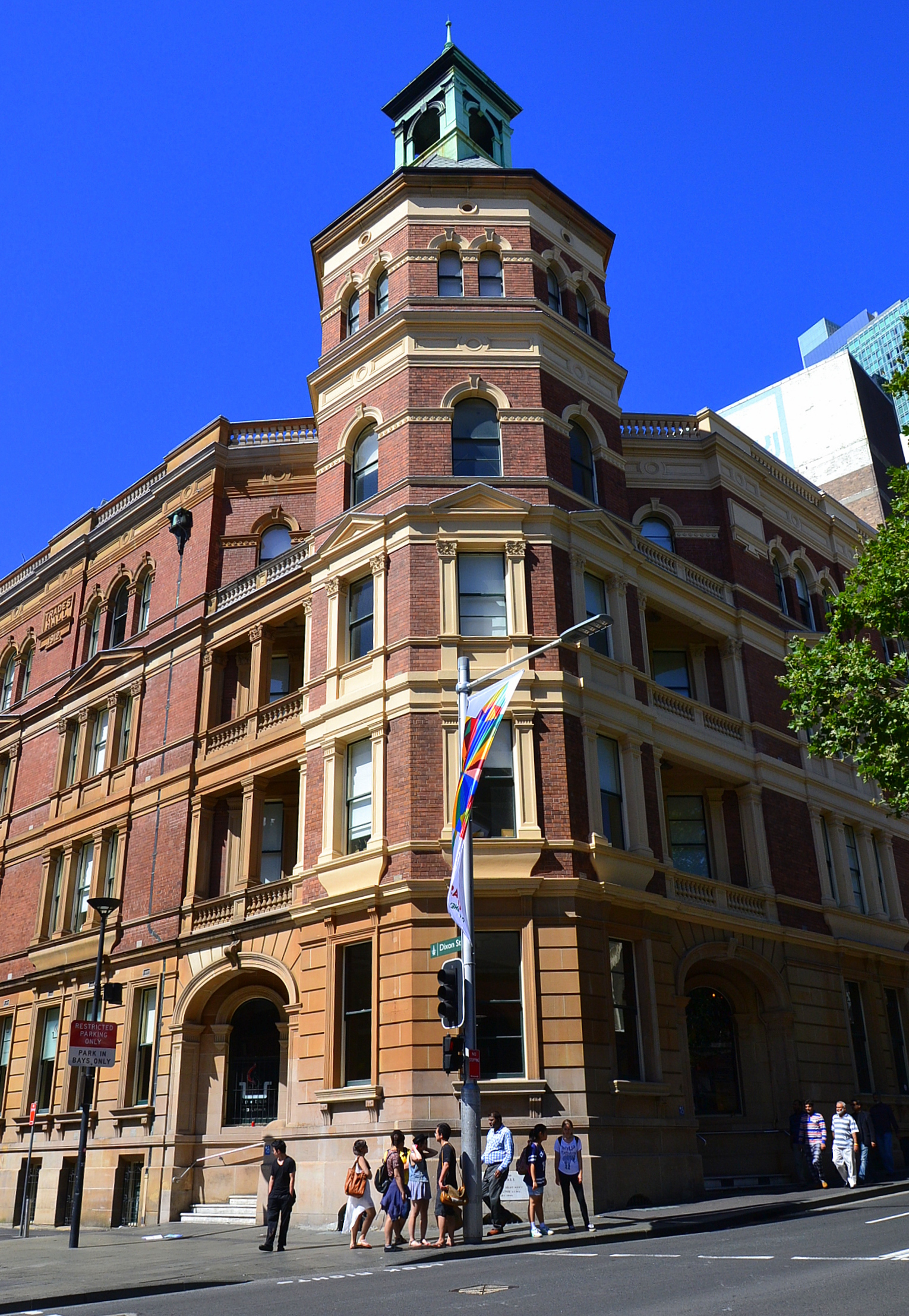
- Sydney Trades Hall

- Location in Sydney central business district Sydney Trades Hall (Australia)
- 33.8773°S 151.2041°E
- Location: 4-10 Goulburn Street, Sydney central business district, City of Sydney, New South Wales, Australia

History
- Built: 1888–1916

Site notes
- Architects: John Smedley; Spain, Cosh and Minnett (later additions)
- Architectural style: Victorian Free Classical
- Owner: Unions NSW

New South Wales Heritage Register
- Official name: Sydney Trades Hall; Trades Hall Building
- Type: State heritage (built)
- Designated: 2 April 1999
- Reference no.: 322
- Type: Trade Union Office
- Category: Community Facilities

The Sydney Trades Hall, also known as the Trades Hall Building and the Trade Unions Hall, is a heritage-listed trade union building located at 4-10 Goulburn Street in the Sydney central business district, in the City of Sydney local government area of New South Wales, Australia. It was designed by John Smedley, with later additions by Spain and Cosh and Minnett, and was developed from 1888 to 1916. The building was built and owned by the Trades Hall Association, the original trade union affiliates who built the hall in 1888, and is now owned by Unions NSW. The property was added to the New South Wales State Heritage Register on 2 April 1999.

== History ==
The Trades Hall was conceived on 14 December 1882 when representatives of thirteen unions met at The Swan with Two Necks Hotel in George Street. This was the original meeting place for the Union Movement. It was there that the organisation that led to the building of the Sydney Trades Hall was formed.

A grant of land was made for the Trades Hall site on 13 October 1885, to the trustees: Henry Copeland (Member of the Legislative Assembly of New South Wales, MLA) of Newtown, Jacob Garrard (MLA) of Balmain, William Ferrier of Balmain (a stonemason), John Edward West of Woolloomooloo (a plumber and gasfitter), John Richard Talbot of Sydney (iron moulder), John Atkinson of Balmain (a boilermaker), Thomas Caddy of Surry Hills (a draper), and Richard Mooney of Woolloomooloo (a journeyman tailor). The trustees were required to "hold and use or allow the said land hereby granted and the buildings to be erected thereon to be at all times hereafter maintained and used as and for a Trades Hall and Literary Institute for the use of the Artificers and Operatives of Sydney aforesaid and others under and in accordance with such Regulations as shall from time to time be made by the Governor".

The Sydney Trades Hall is linked with the history of the union movement in New South Wales, one of the first formalised union movements in the world. Similarly, the birth of the New South Wales Labor Party can be traced to unions who had offices at Trades Hall deciding to form a party to enable a labour voice in the Parliament following the collapse of the Maritime and Shearers Strike early that century.

The first portion of the building was designed in 1887, by architect John Smedley, one of Australia's first native born architects. Smedley won a design competition for the building, which was intended for meetings held by working men and as a place where lectures could be given and instruction in literature obtained. It also included a library and the banner room. On 28 January 1888 Lord Carrington, as State Governor (also Grand Master Freemason of the United Grand Lodge in NSW), laid the foundation stone of Sydney's Trades Hall. Due to lack of funds, it took several years for the building to be erected. Finally, the opening ceremony was performed on 26 January 1895 by the Minister for Education and the Chairman of the Land Trustees, Mr Jacob Garrard. In his address he commented, "The Trades of the colony will now have a home of their own". According to Mr McIntyre, president of the Builders and Contractors Association, "every man employed had been a unionist, and had received the full rate of pay ordered by the associated trades."

The subsequent major additions completed in 1900, 1912 and 1916 followed closely the Victorian Italianate Style of the original building. The architects for these additions were Spain, Cosh and Minnett.

An apocryphal has it that in 1932, New South Wales Premier, Jack Lang had the State's money removed from bank accounts and taken to Trades Hall, where the NSW ALP had offices, so that the Federal Government would not be able to seize it. He was subsequently dismissed from office by Governor Philip Game. However, others contend that Lang did not move any money out of the NSW Treasury, but rather, that he simply refused to allow Federal Government officials into the Treasury building where state revenue was held. This was done in order to prevent citizens being deprived of services owing to the demand that British banks should be repaid before the people.

== Description ==
A large load-bearing brick and sandstone building of four storeys and basement. An octagonal tower of five storeys at the corner of Goulburn and Dixon Streets is capped by a pitched copper roof surmounted by a sheathed square copper cupola. Although enlarged considerably at three main periods, c. 1900, 1912 and 1916 the additions closely follow the original Victorian neo classical design consisting of sandstone to the ground floor, window trims grouped three to a bay, string courses, cornice and balustered parapet with face brickwork to the remainder. The original building is part of the four bays to Goulburn Street while the seven bays to Dixon Street are additions.

=== Condition ===
As of 30 September 1997, the building's physical condition was judged to be good, with low archaeological potential.

The building externally has had little alteration.

=== Modifications and dates ===
- 1888 – foundation stone laid;
- 1895 – opened;
- c. 1900 – addition;
- 1912 – addition;
- 1916 – addition.

== Heritage listing ==
As at 10 December 2008, The Sydney Trades Hall is important as one of the first and continuing headquarters of much of the New South Wales Trade Union Movement. It is a fitting reminder of an important part of Australia's history which was to be followed by many western countries based on Australian experience. The birth of the Labour Party may be traced to Trades Hall leaders. The building's design is by one of Australia's first native born architects, John Smedley. Its composed facades and tower contribute to the Haymarket area by retaining a nineteenth century character and provide a dominant landmark. The Trades Hall was held in high esteem by the working community and this was reinforced by Mr Jacob Gerrard's address at the official opening day. The subsequent rapid growth of the trade Union Movement earlier this century saw the original building enlarged considerably to accommodate its needs. Original records of meetings and other historical events in the life of the Trade Union Movement have been collected and are kept in the original library and banner room.

Sydney Trades Hall was listed on the New South Wales State Heritage Register on 2 April 1999 having satisfied the following criteria.

The place is important in demonstrating the course, or pattern, of cultural or natural history in New South Wales.

The Sydney Trades Hall is important as one of the first and continuing headquarters of much of the New South Wales Trade Union Movement. It is a fitting reminder of an important part of Australia's history which was to be followed by many western countries based on Australian experience. The birth of the Labour Party may be traced to Trades Hall leaders. The building's design is by one of Austrlai's first native born architects, John Smedley.

The place is important in demonstrating aesthetic characteristics and/or a high degree of creative or technical achievement in New South Wales.

The Sydney Trades Hall composed facades and tower contribute to the Haymarket area by retaining a nineteenth century character. In particular it provides a dominant landmark with its well crafted and extensive facades which have an almost "civic like" presence.

The place has a strong or special association with a particular community or cultural group in New South Wales for social, cultural or spiritual reasons.

It was held in high esteem by the working community and this was reinforced by Mr Jacob Gerrard address at the official opening day. The subsequent rapid growth of the trade Union Movement earlier this century saw the original building enlarged considerably to accommodate its needs. The provision of centralised office accommodation and meeting rooms for unions, the Trades Hall has become inseparably linked with the history of the trade Union Movement in NSW and as such is held in high regard by much of the State's workforce.

The place has potential to yield information that will contribute to an understanding of the cultural or natural history of New South Wales. https://tradeshallsydney.wordpress.com/virtual-tour/

Original records of meetings and other historical events in the life of the Trade Union Movement have been collected and are kept in the original library. The Library collection itself is as it was in 1914 and held on the shelving built at the time. and banner room.

The place possesses uncommon, rare or endangered aspects of the cultural or natural history of New South Wales.The collection of banners includes 35 large (over 3 metres by 4 metres) banner dating from 1885 to 1930, plus others pre 1960. There are also 70 small silk banners made for unions to carry on the annual eight-hour day processions. These were made by the Committee (who had offices in the Hall) for unions who had the eight hour work day as part of the conditions of employment in their industry or occupation. To speak with one voice : history of the Trades Hall, Sydney / Kylie Hilton (Sydney: Commissioned by Unions NSW, 2006)

The Sydney Trades Hall is rare for the role it has played in providing a centralised place of operation for the Trade Union Movement. It is rare as the only trade union building in the world that continues to house collections of union material at this scale in the building that they have always been stored in. The banners and library are part of the Heritage of the building and must remain with it.

== See also ==
- Australian labour movement
