= James Cosh =

British missionary

James Cosh (27 June 1838 – 20 September 1900) was a Scottish-Australian missionary and academic.

== Early life and education ==
James Cosh was born on 27 June 1838 at Whitleys near Stranraer, Scotland.

He studied at the University of Glasgow (M.A., 1861), where he received prizes in classics, and the Royal College of Surgeons of Edinburgh, where he studied medicine and physiology.

== Career ==
Cosh was ordained on 4 October 1865 by the Presbytery of Paisley (Reformed Presbyterian Church) after completion of his studies.

Cosh served for four years on Efate in the New Hebrides (now Vanuatu). He translated the Biblical books of Genesis and John into the local language.

In 1870, Cosh moved on to Australia and served as a theological lecturer, before being appointed to the Hunter Baillie chair of Oriental and Polynesian Languages in St Andrew's College, University of Sydney, in 1899.

In 1881 he was the General Assembly delegate to the Pan-Presbyterian Council at Belfast; later that year he became Moderator of the General Assembly of the Presbyterian Church of New South Wales.

J. Graham Miller suggests that Cosh's "devoted and distinguished service in Australia revealed the permanent value of those few brief years of missionary work on Efate."

== Personal life ==
On 31 January 1866 James Cosh married Janet Frame (1843–1904).

They had four children, the eldest of whom, James, became a Presbyterian preacher. Second son Thomas Frame Cosh became a well-known architect, who, mainly through the firm Spain & Cosh, designed many commercial buildings around Sydney.

== Honours and legacy ==
In 1892, he received an honorary doctorate of divinity from the University of Glasgow.

There is a memorial window at St Andrew's College Chapel at the University of Sydney in his honour.
