= Culwulla Chambers =

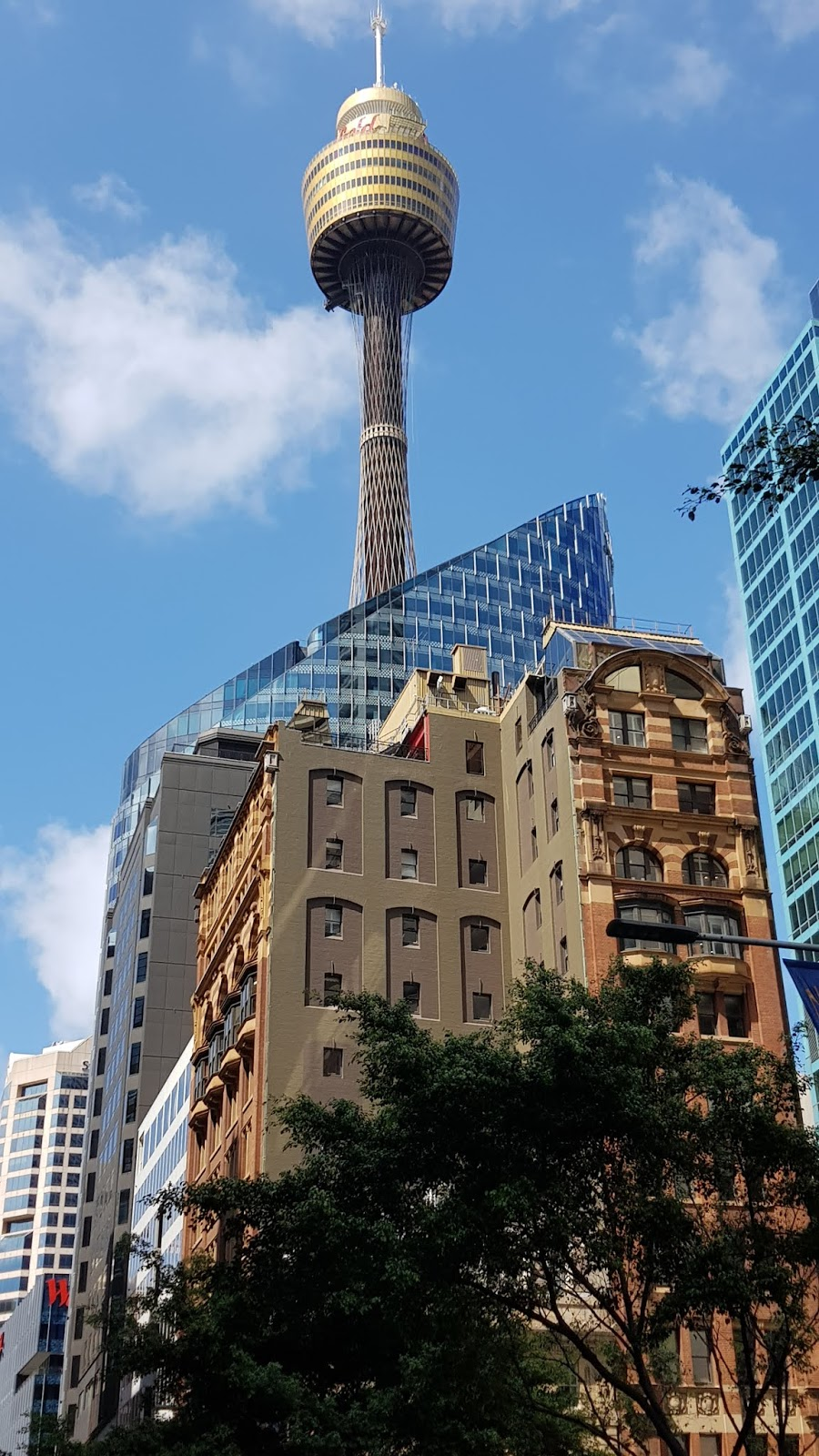
- Culwulla Chambers with the J.P. Morgan Building and Centre Point Tower in the background.
- Interactive map of the Culwulla Chambers area

General information
- Type: Commercial
- Architectural style: Chicago-style
- Location: 67 Castlereagh Street, Sydney, Australia
- Coordinates: 33°52′09″S 151°12′33″E
- Completed: 1912
- Opened: 1 April 1985 (As a legal firm)
- Height: 50.25 metres

Technical details
- Floor count: 14

Design and construction
- Architect: Spain, Cosh and Minnett

The Culwulla Chambers is a heritage listed building located at 67 Castlereagh Street in Sydney, Australia. Its situated in the Central Business District of Sydney. The building is colloquially named as Sydney's first skyscraper, though it is of masonry construction rather than steel frame typically associated with the term. Upon construction it became Australia's tallest habitable building to roof, exceeding the height of Melbourne's Australian Building by a few metres (though that building's architectural spire remained another 2 metres taller).

The building was designed by Spain, Cosh and Minnett and built by R. Wall & Sons. It was completed in 1912 as an office building with ground floor retail. Its construction was partly financed by solicitor and future federal MP Walter Marks, who named it after his birthplace and family property, Culwalla Homestead. The design is a Federation Freestyle Palazzo.

Upon its completion, it became Australia's tallest building, at 178 ft (54 m). It became the focal point for debate in Sydney regarding restrictions on building height. This led ultimately to the Height of Buildings Act 1912 being passed, placing a moratorium on constructing new buildings taller than 150 ft (46 m). This height restriction was subsequently removed in 1955.

The building is for commercial purposes. Historically, it was primarily an office space, but currently it serves as a business space for numerous companies as well as professionals, mainly lawyers. There are 20 barristers operating in Culwulla Chambers practising in a variety of jurisdictions.

Original plans are held by the Institute of Architects New South Wales.
