= Claud Hamilton (architect) =

Australian architect

- Born: 1 June 1891; Bluff, New Zealand
- Died: 21 May 1943 (aged 67); Elizabeth Bay, New South Wales, Australia
- Education: Southland Boys' High School
- Occupation: Architect
- Known for: Apartment buildings

Claud Hamilton (1 June 1891 – 21 May 1943) was a New Zealand-born architect who was active in Sydney from 1916 until his death his death in 1943. He is particularly notable for the design of many distinguished apartment buildings in Darlinghurst and Potts Point in the Eastern Suburbs of Sydney. As a resident of 59 Elizabeth Bay Road, Elizabeth Bay, Hamilton was the first person to propose a tunnel under Kings Cross almost forty years before the Kings Cross Tunnel opened for traffic in 1975 dealing with the traffic gridlock that had developed in that part of the city.

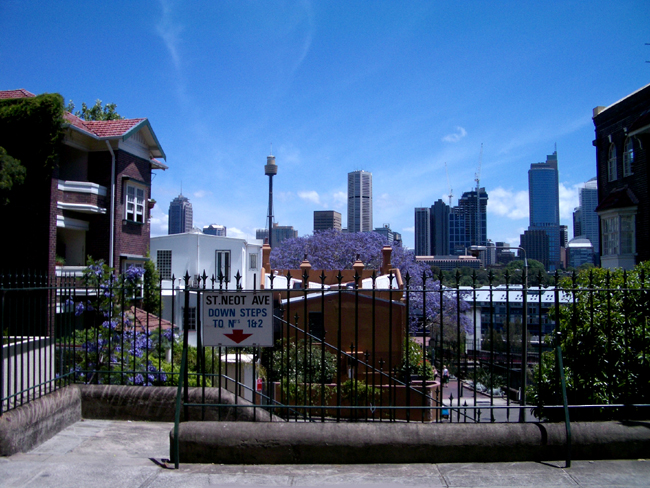
St Neot Avenue Potts Point showing Wirringulla on the left and Kaloola on the right

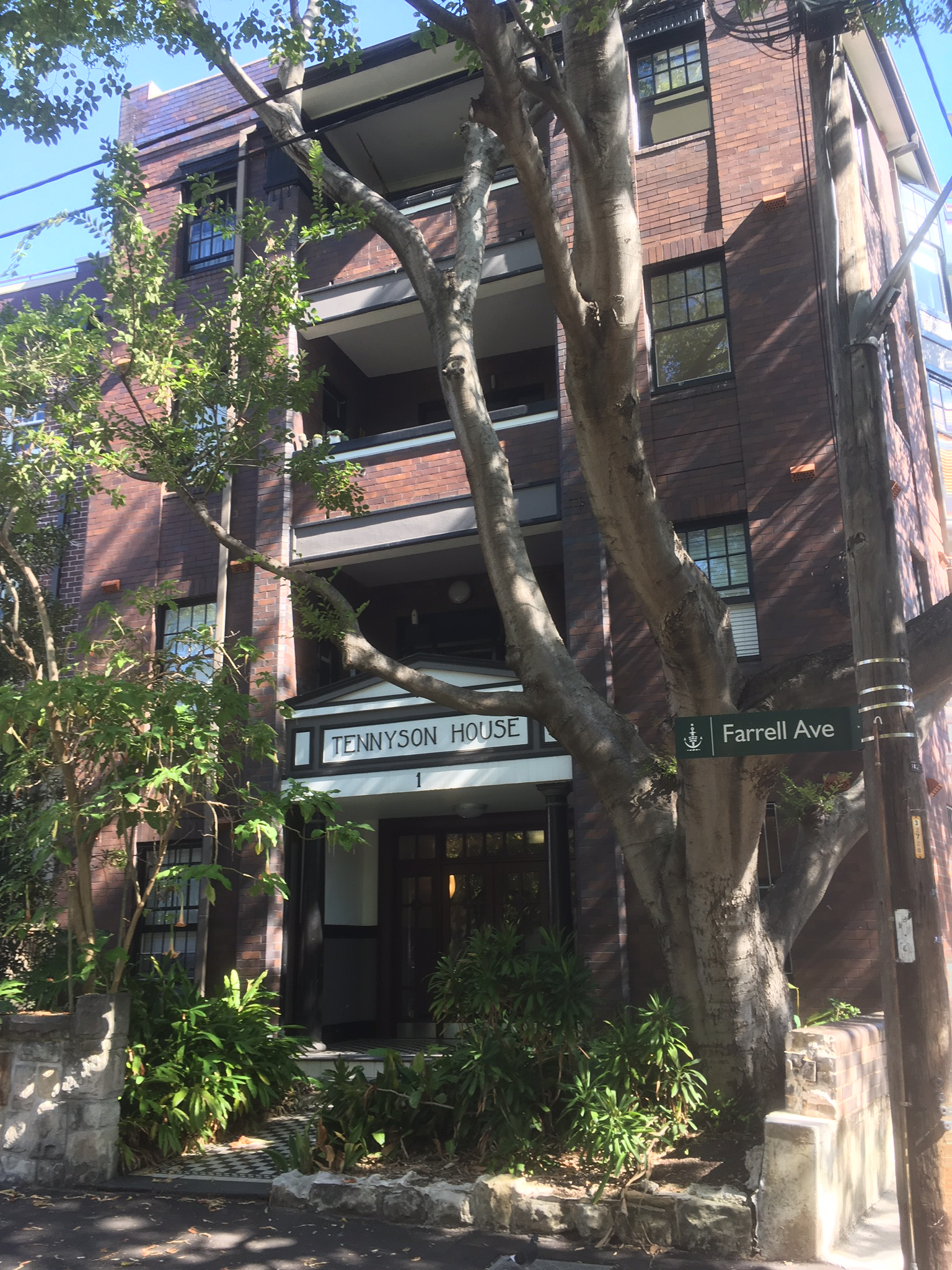
Tennyson House Darlinghurst

== Biography ==
Hamilton was born in Bluff, New Zealand, the youngest son of Alexander McCausland Hamilton and his wife Annette Elizabeth Hamilton (née Cameron). From 1906 until 1909 he attended Southland Boys High School a state single sex boys secondary school with boarding facilities in Invercargill. He played in the 1st XI Cricket team in his final year at school. Invercargill is 30 km by road from Hamilton's home town of Bluff. In 1908 he passed the Junior Civil Service Examination in Southland. In the 1900s students from New Zealand sat examinations in the Science and Art Department of the West London School of Art. In 1909 and 1910 he passed courses in freehand and model drawing from that tertiary institution.

In July 1912 Hamilton migrated to Sydney, Australia. Aged 21 he arrived as a draughtsman. Little is known of his architectural education but by November 1916 he was referring to himself as an architect. He married Irene Elizabeth Williams in Sydney in 1921.

In June 1923 he became a registered architect in New South Wales as an Associate of the Royal Australian Institute of Architects (NSW Chapter). From 1923 until 1929 his architectural office in Sydney was on the seventh floor of the Trust Building which at the time housed the offices of the Daily Telegraph. In the 1930s when writing about the need for slum clearance in the metropolitan area newspapers described Hamilton as a city architect and housing authority. In 1940 Hamilton claimed that under a plan which he had placed before the military authorities accommodation could be provided for 4000 members of the Second Australian Imperial Force. Hamilton said that he was prepared to give to the government the patent rights of a hut which he believed was suitable for military purposes. His only desire was to contribute to the war effort.

With drastic water restrictions expected by 1942 the architect Hamilton was calling for an early version of the Snowy Mountains Scheme to be started some years before engineer Sir William Hudson comemenced work on that scheme.

== Apartments ==
Many of the apartment building designed by Hamilton are now listed on the RAIA NSW Register of Twentieth Century Buildings of Significance. Other designs attributed to Hamilton include:

- Savoy, 10 Hardie Street, Darlinghurst, designed by Hamilton in 1919. It was for many years the inner Sydney address of Australian heiress and philanthropist Dame Eadith Walker when not residing at her western Sydney estate Yaralla on the Parramatta River at Concord. She rented flats 22 and 24 on the 5th floor of Savoy until she took up residence at The Astor in Macquarie Street, Sydney in 1924.
- Kaloola
- Commodore Flats were built by S.B. Gange and his business partner the Hon. T.G. Murray at 30-30b Darlinghurst Road Potts Point to a design by Hamilton. The seven-story face brick building was completed in 1928 and was what would now be known as serviced apartments. The 88 American-style flats housed up to three people in each room in hotel like accommodation. The building was later known as the Kingsview Motel and offered affordable holiday accommodation in the inner city before being sold separately as apartments. Since 2020 the building facade has been retained in a five-building apartment and entertainment precinct on Darlinghurst Road designed by Sydney architect's Tonkin Zulaikha Greer and Panov Scott. The building that was originally Commodore will become The Consort in the new development that is expected to be complete by 2026.
- Tennyson House was built in 1927 by W.H. James in partnership with Hamilton as a speculative development. In 1928 James and Hamilton sold the entire building as one lot enabling them to develop Byron Hall nearby in Potts Point. It was bought by Gordon and Ada Joyce-Brandon who moved into the building with their adult children. Gordon and Ada lived in flat 9 at the top with a view of the Sydney Harbour Bridge as its spans connected before its opening in 1932. Due to the declining economy in Sydney prior to the Great Depression flats were often not tenanted. In that era when their daughters Rene married Harry Weir and May married William Forrester at St John's Anglican Church, Darlinghurst, the wedding receptions were held in flat 6. From the 1930s until the 1950s Dulcie Deamer, who was known as the Queen of Bohemia, lived alone on the ground floor in flat 1 opposite the caretaker who lived in flat 2. The New Zealand-born Catholic Deamer had divorced in the 1920s and the Catholic born Ada Joyce-Brandon kept a watchful eye to her from her large flat on the top floor. The building originally had 11 flats but during World War II the Joyce-Brandon family broke down some of the mansion flats introducing further accommodation on the second and third floors until there were 16 flats. After the influx of American servicemen during the war Kings Cross was not the same. The Joyce-Brandon's moved to the North Shore of Sydney and Deamer died in the Little Sisters of the Poor Home in Randwick, and was buried with Catholic rites in Botany cemetery.
- Byron Hall was designed by Hamilton in 1928 after selling Tennyson House in Darlinghurst.
- Wirringulla was designed by Hamilton in 1927 and in 1996 became the set of the Australian romantic comedy Dating the Enemy.
