= John G. Brandon =

Writer best known for Australian detective fiction

- Born: John Gordon Joyce; 8 March 1879; Richmond, Victoria, Australia
- Died: 21 May 1941 (aged 62); Newbury, Berkshire, England
- Occupation: Novelist
- Spouses: Rachel Mary Pemberton; Ruby Oates
- Writing career
- Genre: Detective fiction

John G. Brandon (8 March 1879 – 21 May 1941) was an Australian-born writer known for his English crime fiction writing.

== Birth and parents ==
Brandon was born John Gordon Joyce on 8 March 1879 in Richmond, Victoria and was baptised at St Ignatius' Church, Richmond, on 22 July 1883. He was the first son of actors John Gordon Joyce (1836–1903) and Mary Emma Bate (1858–1915). His mother was known professionally as Emma Bronton. His parents married on 11 May 1878 in Melbourne and on 20 May 1895 his mother petitioned for a divorce from her husband on the grounds of desertion, drunkenness and cruelty. The Joyce's had been on tour in September 1888. Mr Joyce was discharged from the company in which they were acting, and while she went to Auckland it was arranged that he should go to Melbourne, where their two children were living with the partitioner's mother. Mrs Joyce gave him £16 to pay his expenses but he didn't go to the grandmother's house. Mr Joyce Snr had not been since nor had he in any way contributed to the support of Mrs Joyce and their children since that time. The suit was undefended and a decree nisi was granted, with costs against Mr Joyce.

== Brandon family ==
In 1895 his mother married again in Melbourne and the young Joyce took the name of his stepfather and became known as John Gordon Brandon. George Otto Woods Brandon (1860–1898) was born in Liverpool, England, and from the 1890s was a hotelier in Perth. After moving to the Eastern States of Australia he was also an actor who worked with the producer W. B. O’Grady. He had on several occasions produced plays in the Shepparton District and he and his wife where hoteliers for a time in Mooroopna. He died by his own hand shooting himself at 38 years of age in Shepparton, on 12 December 1898. At the time he was secretary of the Public Library at Shepparton and was insolvent. When John G. Brandon's maternal grandmother Mary Emma Bate (née Draper) died on 20 July 1896 his mother Mary Emma Brandon received an estate worth £1572. Brandon's twice married mother Mary Emma Brandon, but still known by the stage name of Emma Bronton, died in London in 1915, at 52 years of age. She had recently appeared in Cosmo Hamilton's London stage production of The Blindness of Virtue. Press reports at the time refer to her son as the English writer Jack Brandon.

== Brother ==
His younger brother, Gordon Bate Joyce, was born to John Gordon and Mary Emma Joyce at their residence, Burrawarna, in Richmond, on 1 April 1880. Little is known of John G. Brandon's education but his younger brother was educated at Xavier College in Melbourne. Known socially from the 1890s as Gordon Joyce-Brandon in business circles he was known as Gordon Brandon. He married Ada Amelia Isherwood (1879–1962) in Victoria and they moved to Sydney. They had seven children with their first son being named in recognition of his step grandfather George Otto Woods Brandon and his father's birth father Gordon Bate Joyce as Gordon Otto Joyce-Brandon (1901–1952). After moving to New South Wales, Gordon and Ada Joyce-Brandon first lived in Waverley before living on acreage at Burrawarna Park, Cabramatta. As a molasses merchant in Sussex Street and on the Parramatta River at Mortlake Gordon Joyce-Brandon later owned the Claud Hamilton designed block of mansion flats Tennyson House in Darlinghurst. The Joyce-Brandon's owned Resthaven on Scotland Island and a house on Thyra Road, Palm Beach before dying at their residence in Lane Cove.

== Australian actor ==
Little else is known of his younger life in Melbourne. It is said that he was a heavyweight boxer before he became a writer but there is no evidence of that. He became an actor in Melbourne and Victorian regional towns using the name of John G. Brandon. He was then stage manager for the Hawtrey Theatre Company in Sydney.

== Emigrates to England ==
As John Gordon Joyce he married in Melbourne in 1900 and had two children, a girl and a boy. The family moved to England around 1909 and as John Gordon Joyce he and his family are listed in the 1911 English Census as living in Wandsworth with Joyce's occupation given as dramatic author. He is by then writing under his acting name of John G. Brandon. There are several newspaper reports around this time of English touring companies performing plays by Brandon in Australia.

== Writer ==
One of Brandon's first plays was a topical one written in 1915 on Belgium and the war entitled There Was a King in Flanders.

== Sexton Blake ==
Brandon contributed 55 tales to the Sexton Blake Library. His first, The Survivor's Secret featured Ronald Sturges Vereker Purvale, a popular crime-fighter who went by the name 'RSVP'. The character was later reworked into Arthur Stukeley Pennington, or 'ASP' for his own series.

== Second marriage and death ==
His first marriage broke up and his wife returned to Australia with their young son, but their daughter Lillian, who later wrote under the name of Grania Brandon stayed with her father. Joyce married Ruby Oates in 1917 and his surname is given as Brandon on the marriage record. He had a son by his second wife Ruby, the writer Gordon Brandon and a daughter Jean. John Gordon Brandon died on 21 May 1941 in Newbury, Berkshire, with the surname Brandon on his death certificate.

== Academic study ==
John Arnold from the School of Languages, Literature, Cultures and Linguistics at Monash University has written about the careers of the Australian expatriate writers, John Gordon Brandon and Robert Coutts Armour, better known as Coutts Brisbane, bringing them to a current Australian readership.

=== Novelist ===
His novels included:

- The Big Heart (1923)
- Young Love (1925)
- The Joy Ride (1927)
- The Silent House (1928)
- Nighthawks! (1929)
- The Big City (1930)
- Murder in Mayfair (1934)
- The Yellow Mask (1935)
- The Dragnet (1936)
- The Secret Cargo of Chi Lee (1936)
- Death in the Ditch (1940)
- Gang War! (1940)
- Murder for a Million (1942)
- The Case of the Would Be Widow! (1950)

=== Series ===
His Patrick Aloysius McCarthy series included:

- Red Altars (1928) aka The Secret Brotherhood
- The Black Joss (1931)
- West End (1933)
- The One-Minute Murder (1934)
- The Riverside Mystery (1935)
- The Case Of The Withered Hand (1936)
- Death Tolls the Gong (1936)
- CID (1936)
- Murder at the Yard (1936)
- The Pawnshop Murder (1936)
- The Snatch Game (1936)
- The Bond Street Murder (1937)
- Death in Downing Street (1937)
- The Hand of Seeta (1937)
- The Mail-van Mystery (1937)
- Murder in Soho (1937)
- Bonus for Murder (1938)
- The Cork Street Crime (1938)
- The £50 Marriage Case (1938) aka The £250 Marriage Case
- Finger-prints Never Lie (1939)
- The Frame Up (1938)
- The Mark of the Tong (1938)
- The Night Club Murder (1938)
- The Regent Street Raid (1938)
- The Crooked Five! (1939)
- Death On Delivery (1939)
- Mr Pennington Comes Through (1939)
- Mr Pennington Goes Nap (1940)
- A Scream in Soho (1940)
- Yellow Gods (1940)
- The Death in the Quarry (1941)
- The Espionage Killings (1941)
- Mr Pennington Barges In (1941)
- The Blue-Print Murders (1942)

The following in his Patrick Aloysius McCarthy series were published posthumously and were actually written by his son Gordon Brandon.

- Death in Jermyn Street (1942)
- Death Comes Swiftly (1942)
- Mr Pennington Sees Red (1942)
- The Transport Murders (1942)
- Death in D Division (1943)
- Death in Duplicate (1945)
- Candidate for a Coffin! (1946)
- M for Murder (1949)
- The Corpse Rode On (1952)
- Murderer's Stand-in (1953)
- The Call Girl Murders (1954)
- Death of a Greek (1955)
- Murder on the Beam (1956)
- Death of a Socialite (1957)
- The Corpse from the city (1958)
- Murder in Pimlico (1958)
- Death Stalks in Soho! (1959)

=== Sexton Blake Series ===
- The Survivor's Secret (1933)
- The Taxi Cab Murder (1933)
- The Tragedy of the West End Actress (1933)
- The Case of the Gangster's Moll (1934)
- The Championship Crime (1934)
- The Chink's Victim (1934)
- The Glass Dagger (1934)
- Murder on the Stage (1934)
- The Mystery of the Three Cities (1934)
- On the Midnight Beat (1934)
- Under Police Protection (1934)
- By Order of the Tong (1935)
- The Case of the Murdered Commissionaire (1935)
- The Downing Street Discovery (1935)
- Murder in Y Division (1935)
- The Red Boomerang (1935)
- The Case of the Night Club Queen (1936)
- Dead Man's Evidence (1936)
- The Girl Who Knew Too Much (1936)
- Murder on the Fourth Floor (1936)
- The Mystery of the Murdered Blonde (1936)
- The Mystery of the Three Acrobats (1936)
- The Victim of the Thieves' Den (1936)
- The Bond Street Raiders (1937)
- The Crime in the Kiosk (1937)
- The Diamond of Ti Lingo (1937)
- The Man from Italy (1937)
- The Melbourne Mystery (1937)
- The Mystery of the Murdered Sentry (1937)
- The Mystery of X20 (1937)
- The Spy from Spain (1937)
- The Tattooed Triangle (1937)
- The Victim of the Secret Service (1937)
- The Clue of the Tattooed Man (1938)
- The False Alibi (1938)
- Murder on the High Seas (1938)
- The Mystery of the Dead Man's Wallet (1938)
- The Mystery of the Murdered Ice Cream Man (1938)
- The Mystery of the Street Musician (1938)
- The Pigeon Loft Crime (1938)
- The Roadhouse Mystery (1938)
- Fatal Forgery (1939)
- The Great Taxi Cab Ramp (1939)
- The Gunboat Mystery (1939)
- In the Hands of Spies (1939)
- The Man from Singapore (1939)
- The Man with Jitters (1939)
- Murder on the Ice Rink (1939)
- The Mystery of the Green Bottle (1939)
- The Black Swastika (1940)
- Crook's Cargo (1940)
- On Ticket of Leave (1940)
- The Riddle of the Dead Man's Bay (1940)
- The Riddle of the Greek Financier (1940)
- The Terror of the Pacific (1940)
- Under Secret Orders (1941)
