= Thomas Walker (philanthropist) =

Businessman, banker, philanthropist & politician from NSW Australia born 1804

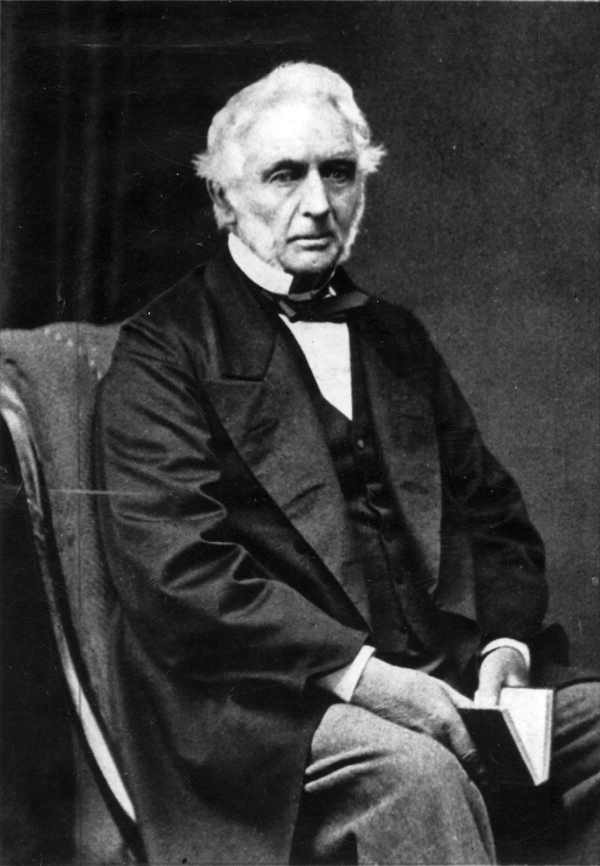

Member of the New South Wales Legislative Council
- In office 1 June 1843 – 31 July 1845
- Constituency: Port Phillip

Personal details
- Born: 3 May 1804 Leith, Scotland
- Died: 2 September 1886 (aged 82) Concord West, New South Wales
- Resting place: St John's, Ashfield
- Spouse: Jane Hart (m. 1860)
- Children: Dame Eadith Walker

Thomas Walker (3 May 1804 – 2 September 1886) was a New South Wales colonial politician, merchant banker and philanthropist. At the time of his death, he was one of the wealthiest and most influential colonialists in New South Wales.

He was the father of Dame Eadith Walker and founder of Yaralla Estate. The Thomas Walker Hospital was named in his honor.

== Life and career ==
Thomas Walker was born at Leith, Scotland, in 1804.

He married Jane Steel Hart on 25 July 1860, when he was 56 and she was 28 years old. There was one child of the marriage, Eadith. Jane died on 26 January 1870 and was buried at St John's Ashfield.

In 1876, he funded a parcel of land in Ashfield to provide a new residence for the Sydney Foundling Hospital l, (Now The Infants' Home Child and Family Services).

== Legacy ==
Walker died in 1886 in Concord, New South Wales, and was buried in the cemetery at St John's Ashfield, He left a large fortune, and was survived by his daughter Eadith.

Under a codicil in Walker's will, he left £100,000 to establish the Thomas Walker Convalescent Hospital in the Sydney suburb of Concord West. The hospital was duly designed by Sir John Sulman in the Federation Free Classical style and built in 1893. In the early 1900s, author Henry Lawson was several times a patient there, treated for his alcoholism.

The Thomas Walker Hospital is now known as Rivendell Child, Adolescent and Family Unit and specialises in the treatment of young people with problems. Yaralla Estate still survives as the Dame Eadith Walker Hospital. Both hospitals are listed on the Register of the National Estate.

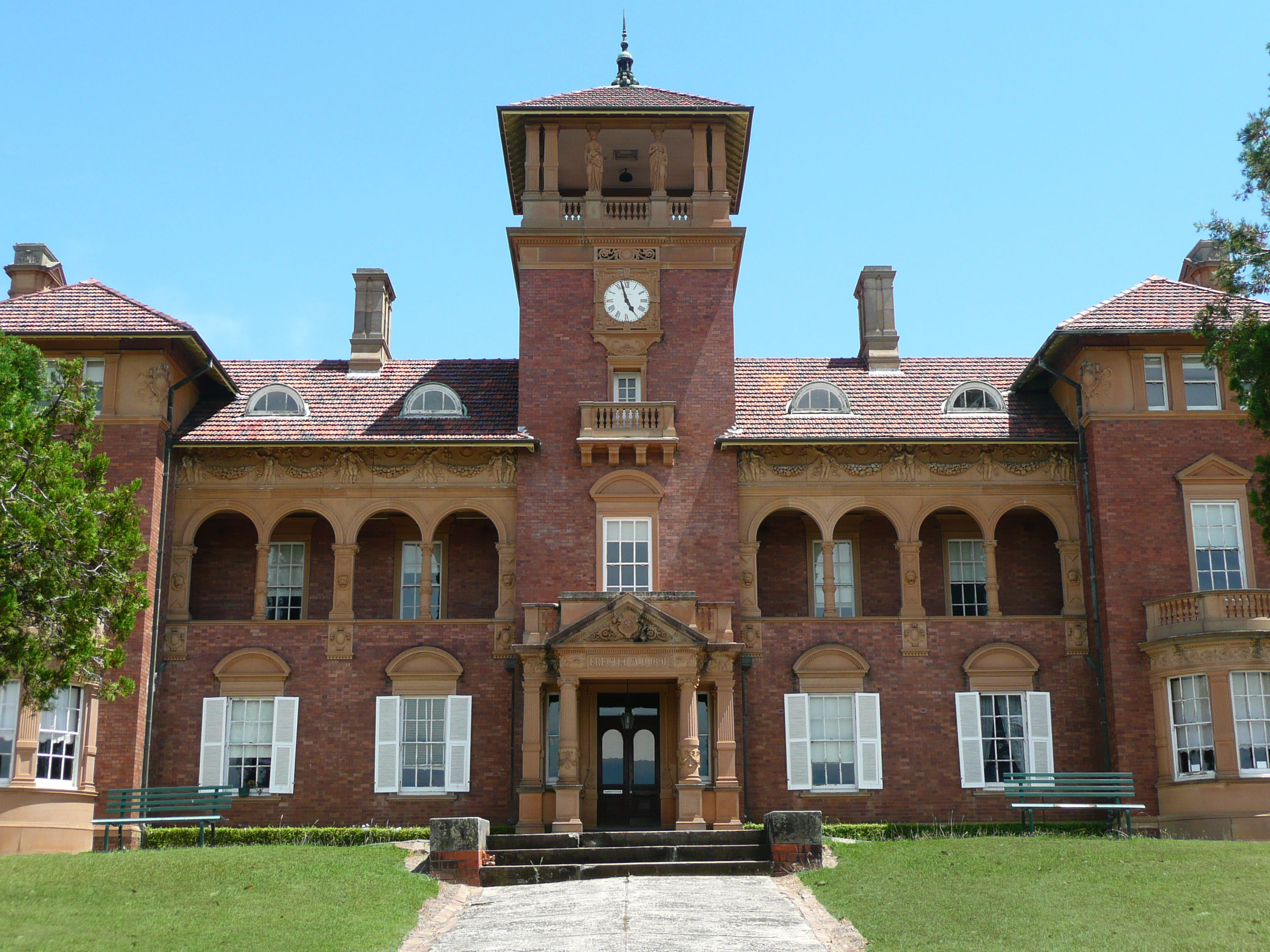
Thomas Walker Convalescent Hospital

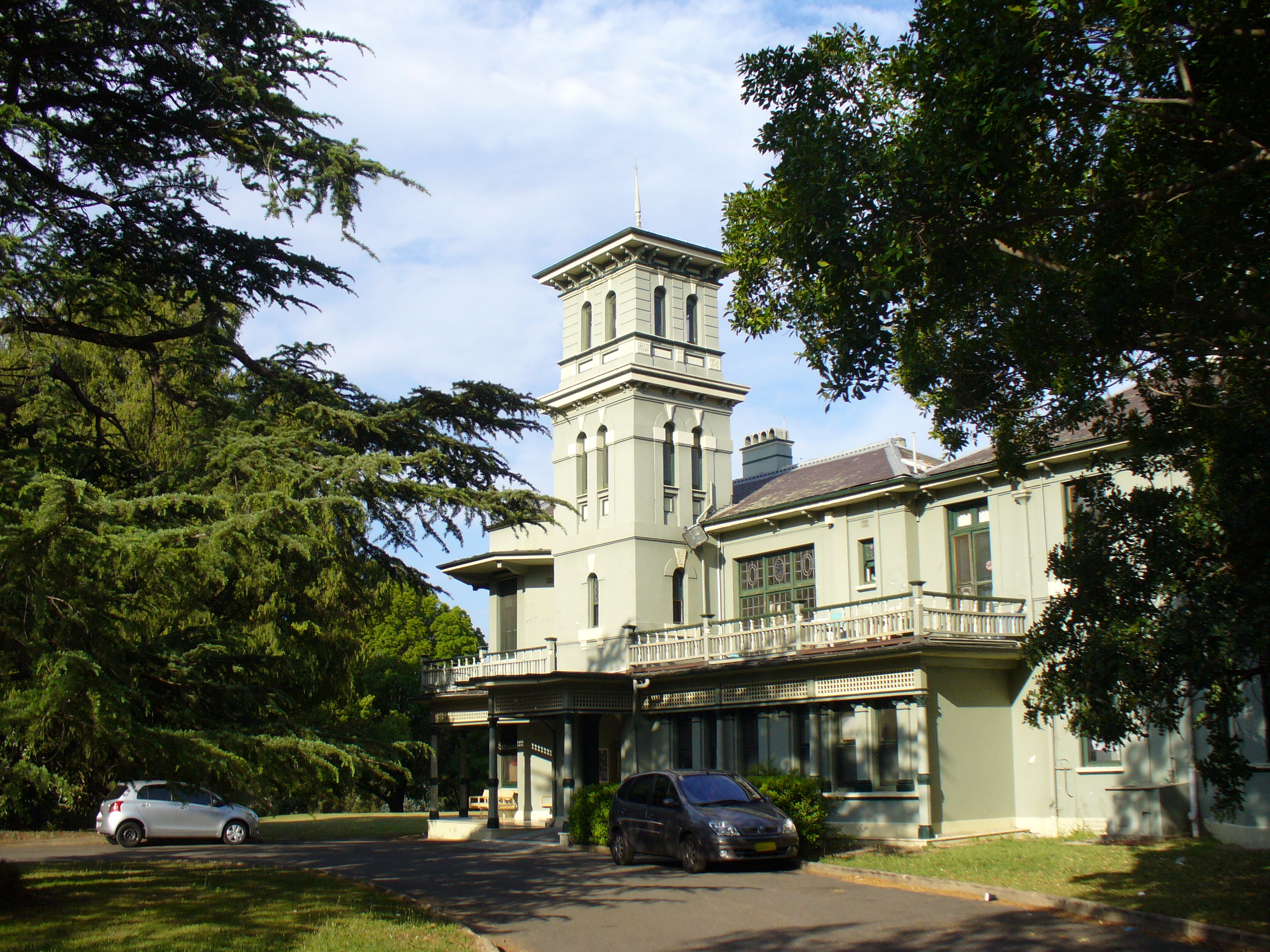
Yaralla Mansion 2007

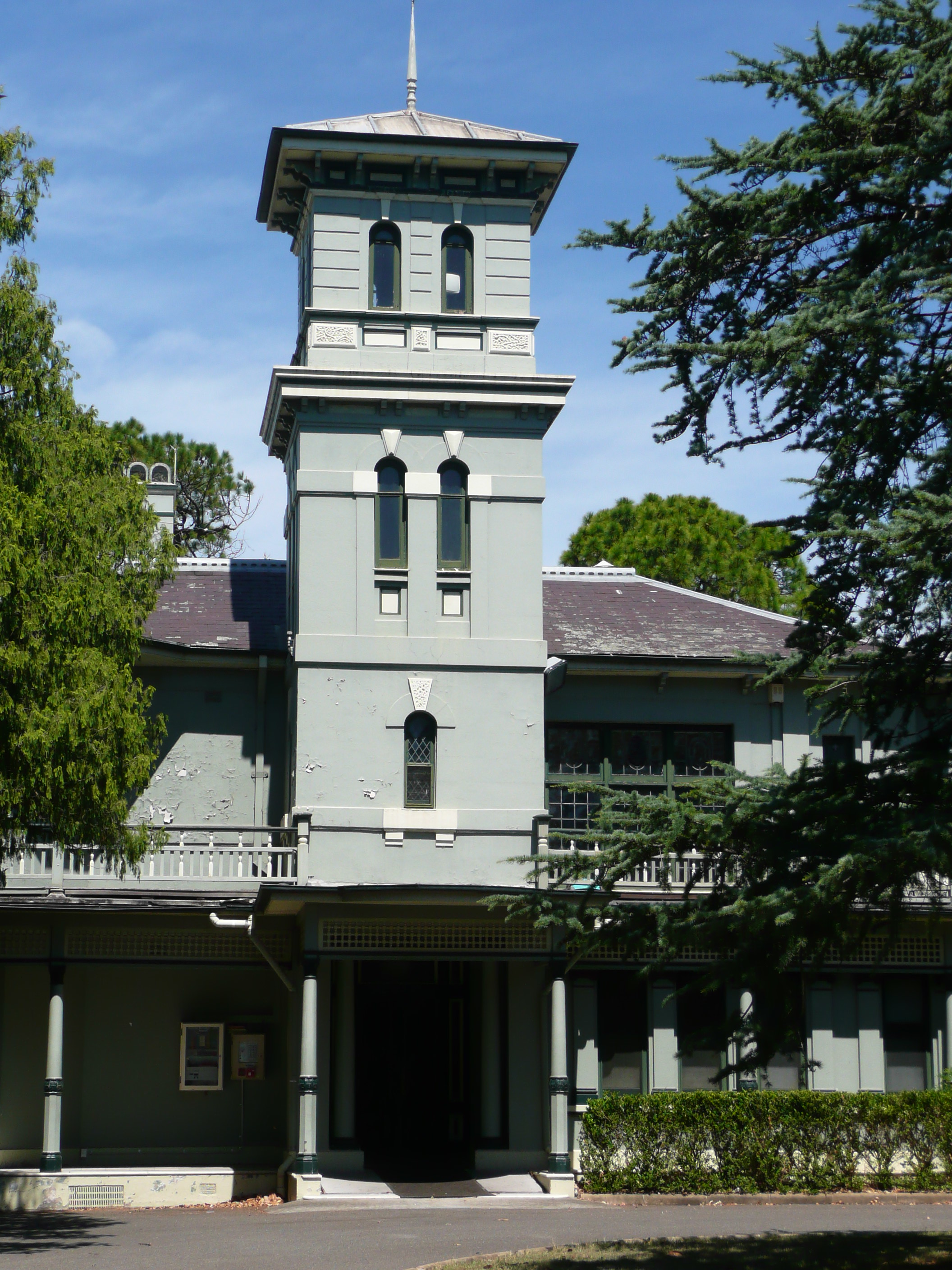
Yaralla 2009, now Dame Eadith Walker Hospital

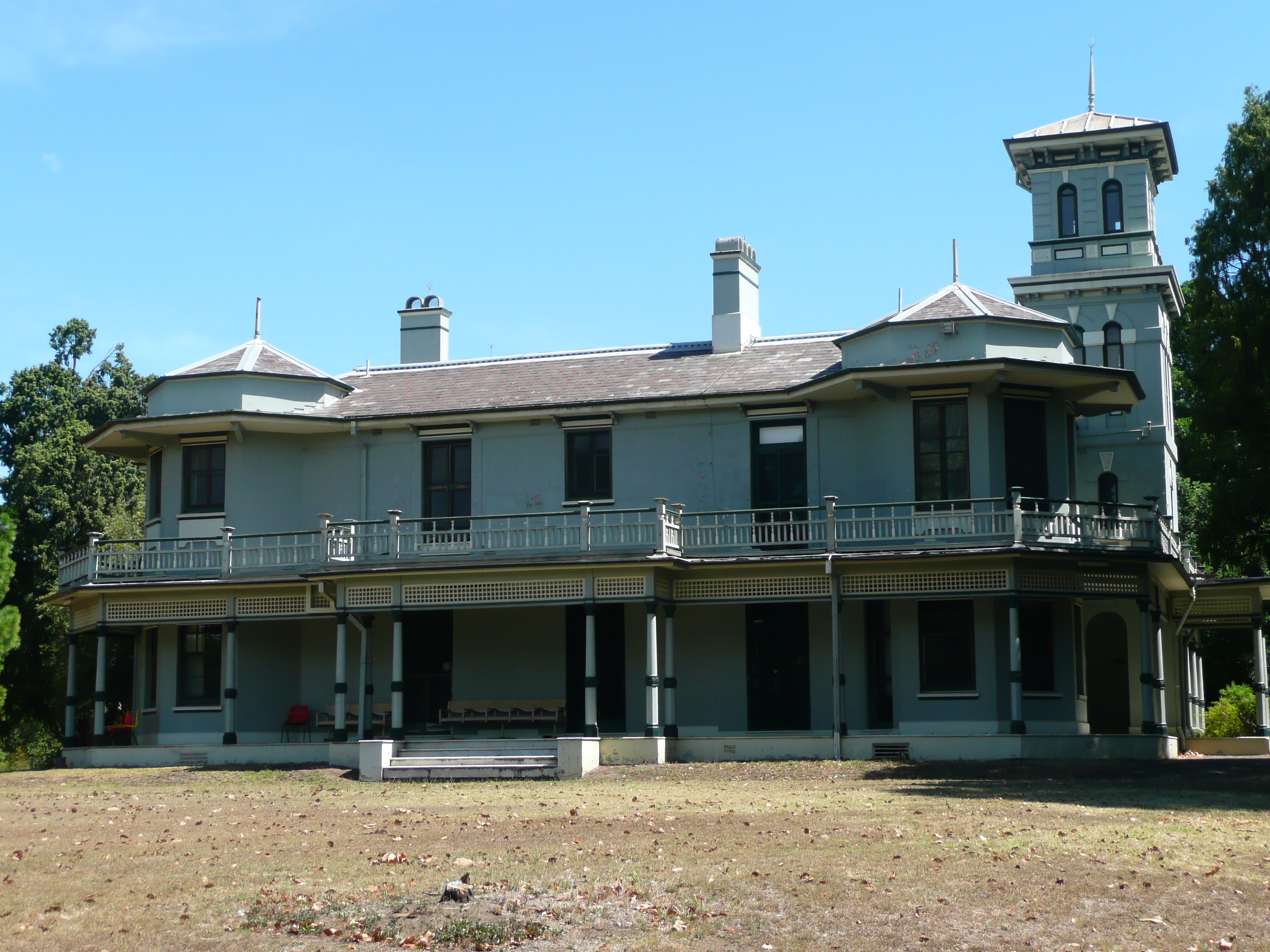
North side of the house

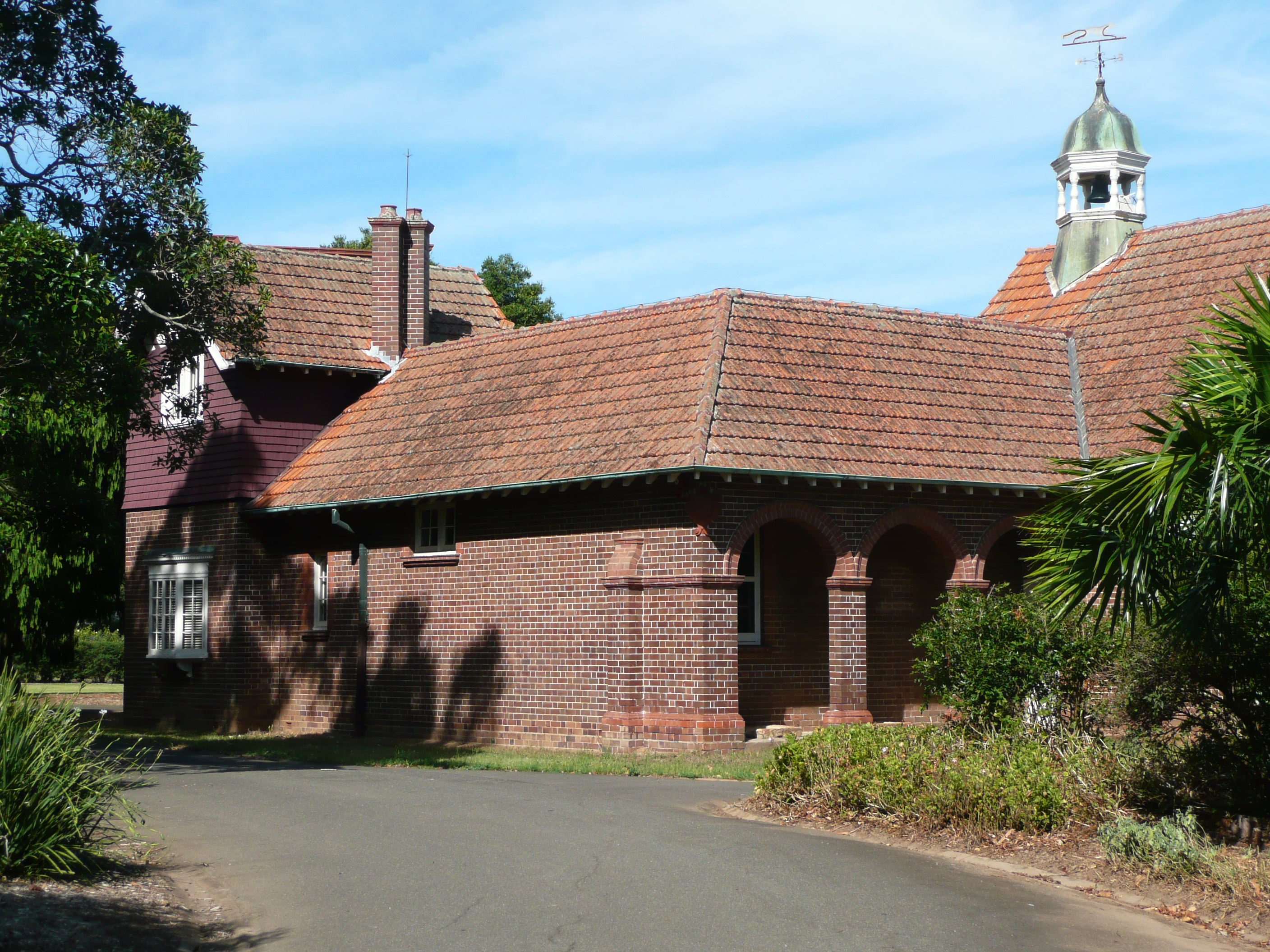
Yaralla Estate stables, designed by John Sulman

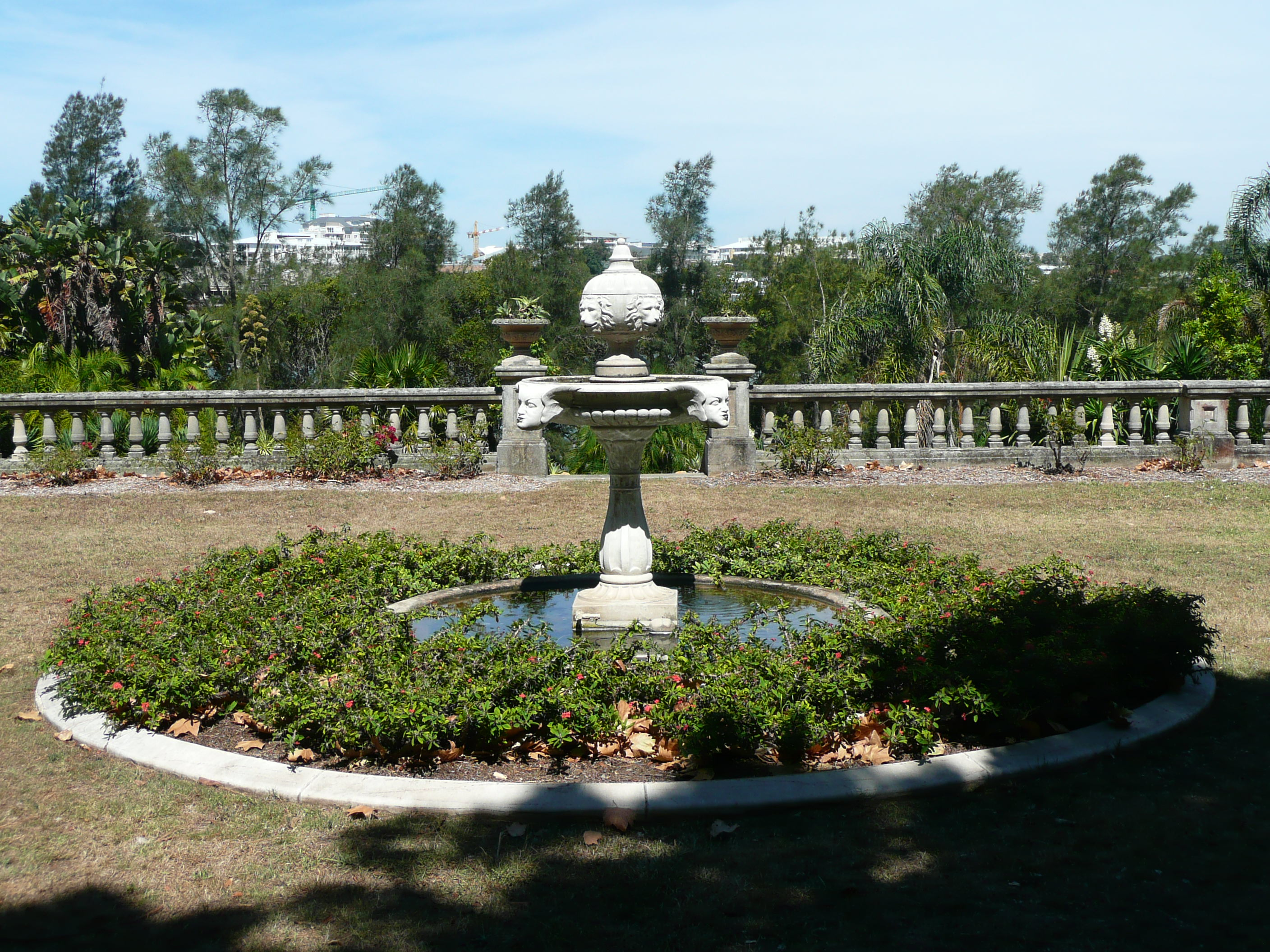
Yaralla Estate grounds

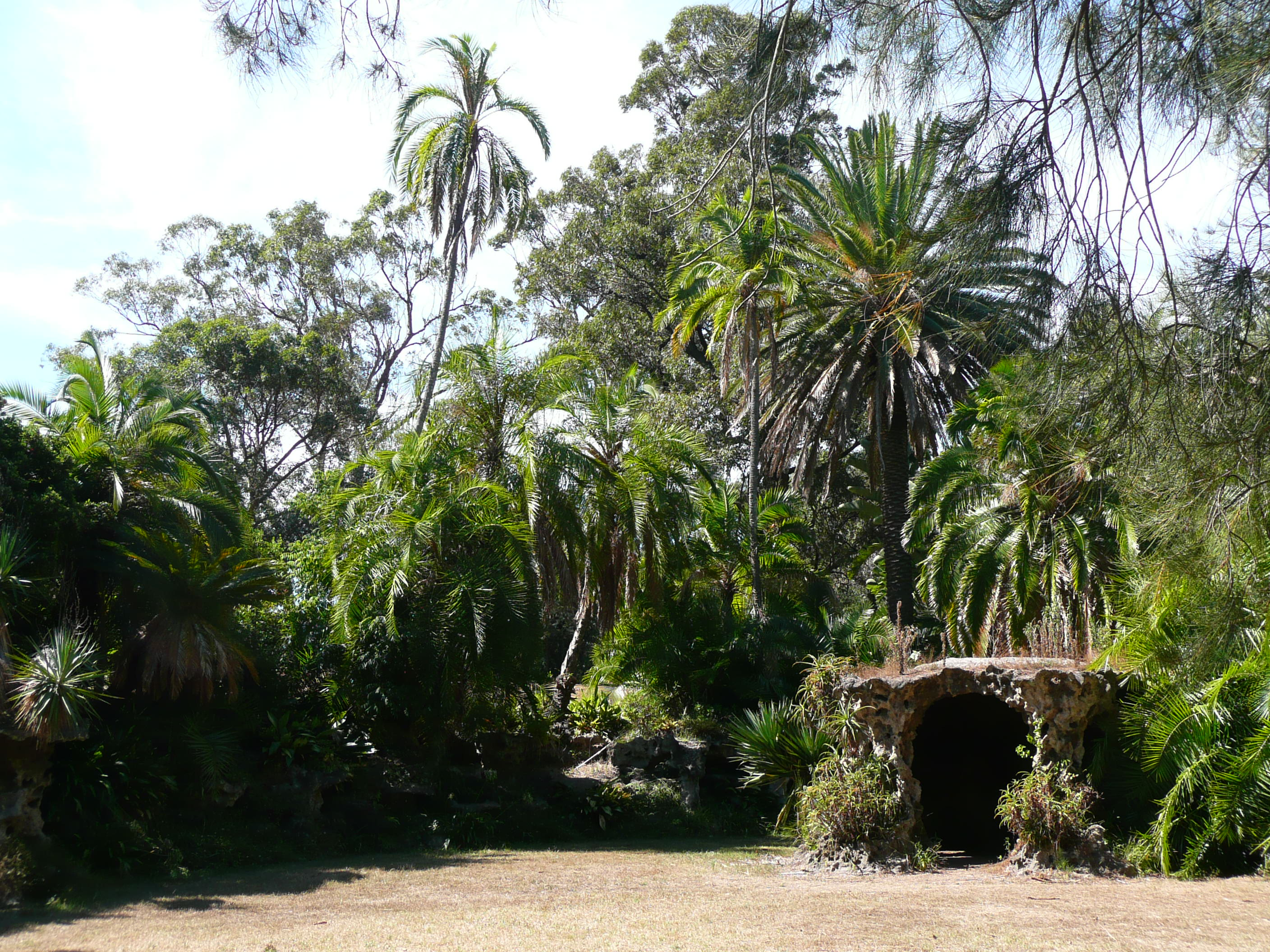
Grotto at former site of swimming pool

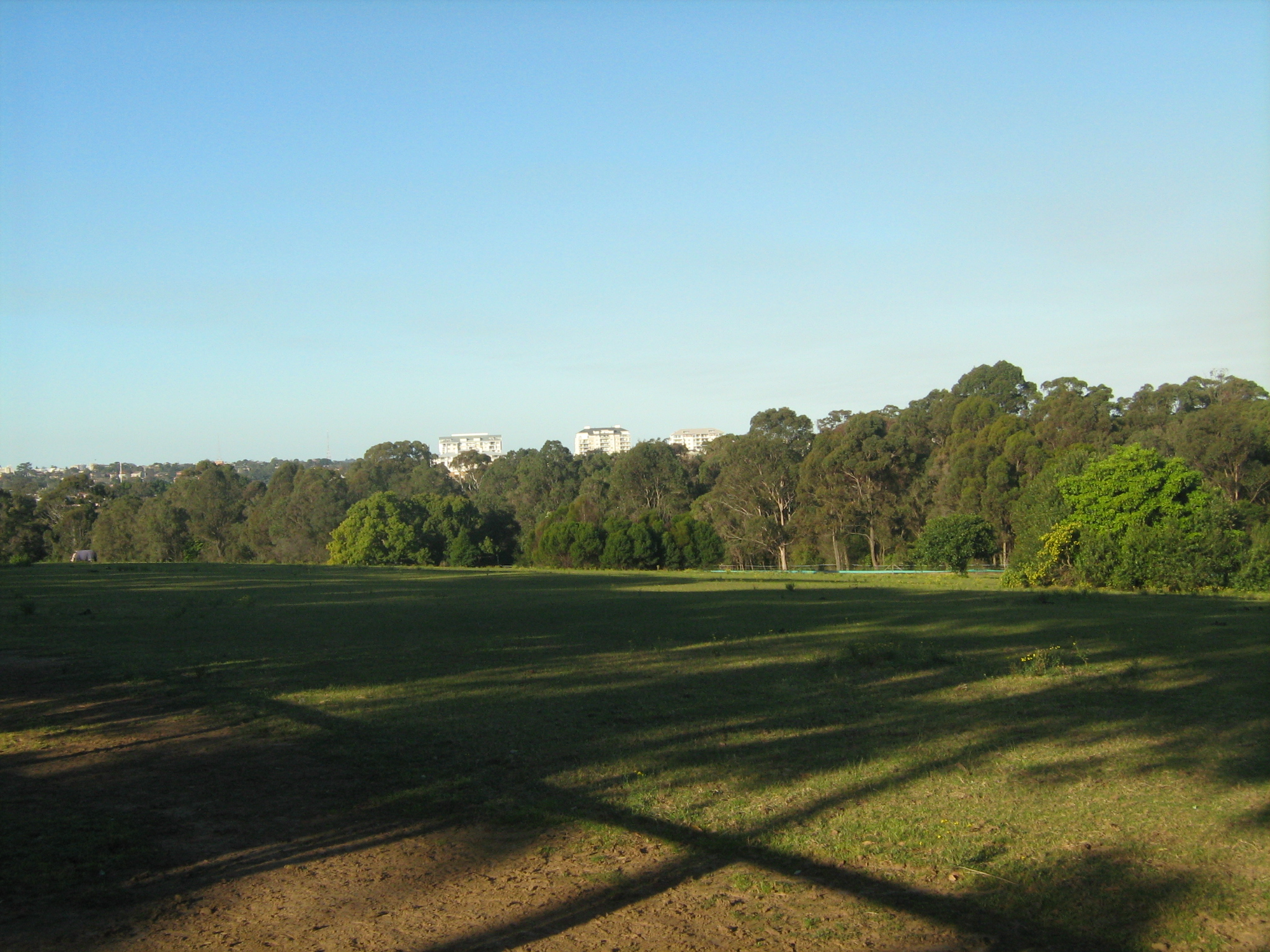
Yaralla Estate field and Turpentine forest

== Notes ==
New South Wales Legislative Council
New creation	Member for Port Phillip; 1843–1845; Served alongside: C. Ebden / A. Young, J. Lang, A. Thomson / T. Mitchell, C. Nicholson	Succeeded by Maurice O'Connell; Thomas Boyd (Two vacancies filled)
