= Eadith Walker =

Australian philanthropist

Eadith Campbell Walker
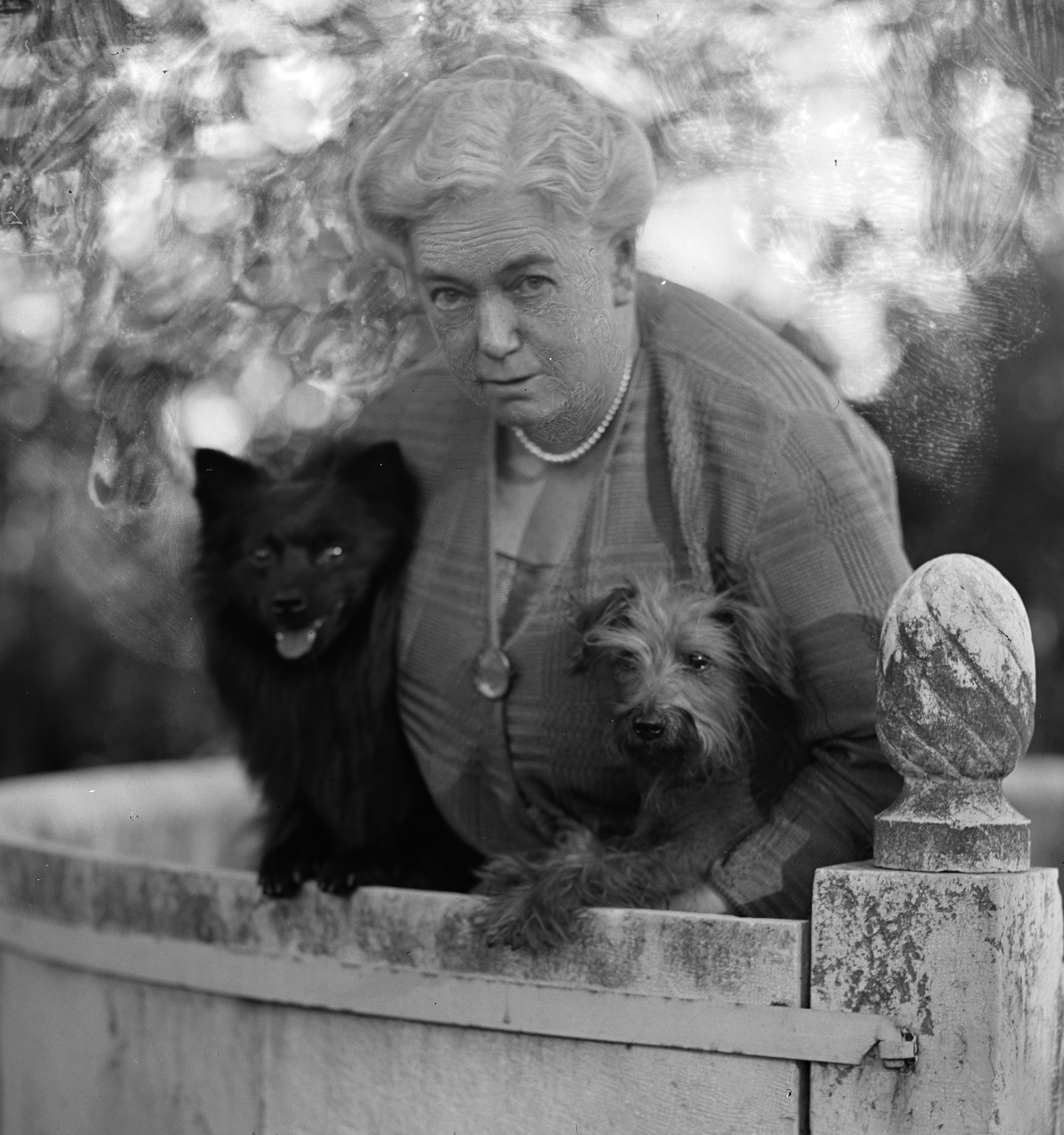
- Dame Eadith Campbell Walker with her dogs, Yaralla, 1924
- Born: 18 September 1861; The Rocks, New South Wales, Sydney
- Died: 8 October 1937 (aged 76); Yaralla Estate, Concord, Sydney
- Known for: philanthropy, support of Australian soldiers

Dame Eadith Campbell Walker DBE (18 September 1861 – 8 October 1937) was an Australian heiress and philanthropist.

== Life and career ==
Eadith Campbell Walker was born at The Rocks, Sydney, the only child of Scottish parents, Thomas Walker, a merchant, and his wife Jane (née Hart). The family moved to their home, Yaralla, an Italianate mansion on the Parramatta River in Concord West, an inner-western suburb of Sydney. Following the death of her mother, she was raised by her paternal aunt, Joanna Walker.

She and her father carried out numerous charitable works in Australia. She housed soldiers returning from World War I with tuberculosis. Additionally, she supported sporting clubs, religious, educational, and health institutions, as well as returned soldiers after the First World War.

== Honours ==
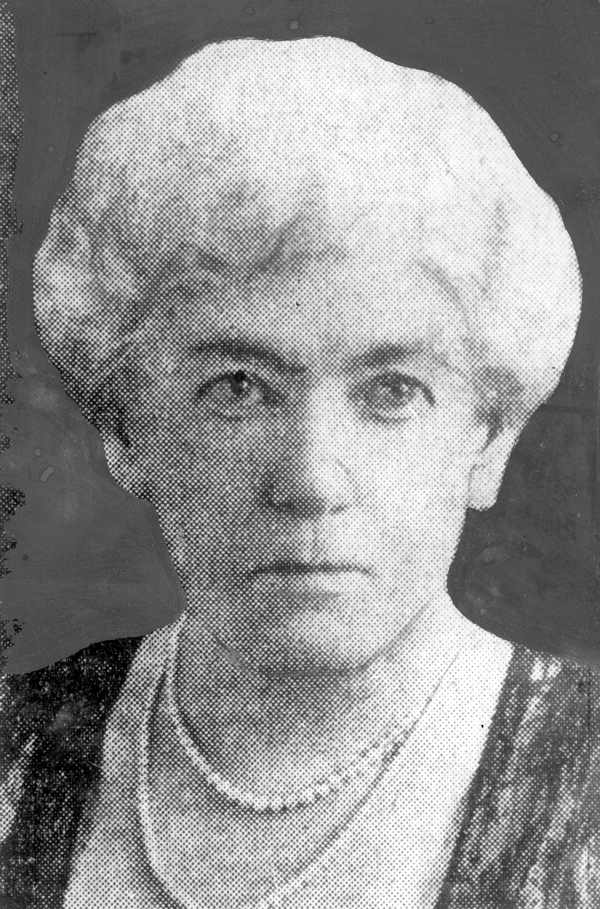
Eadith Walker

She was appointed a Commander of the Order of the British Empire (CBE) in 1918 for "Voluntary service in connection with all Red Cross movements in New South Wales during three years; also special work in providing for consumptive soldiers, and in supporting all industries for disabled men". She was subsequently appointed a Dame Commander of the Order of the British Empire (DBE) in the 1928 Birthday Honours for philanthropic and charitable services.

== Legacy ==
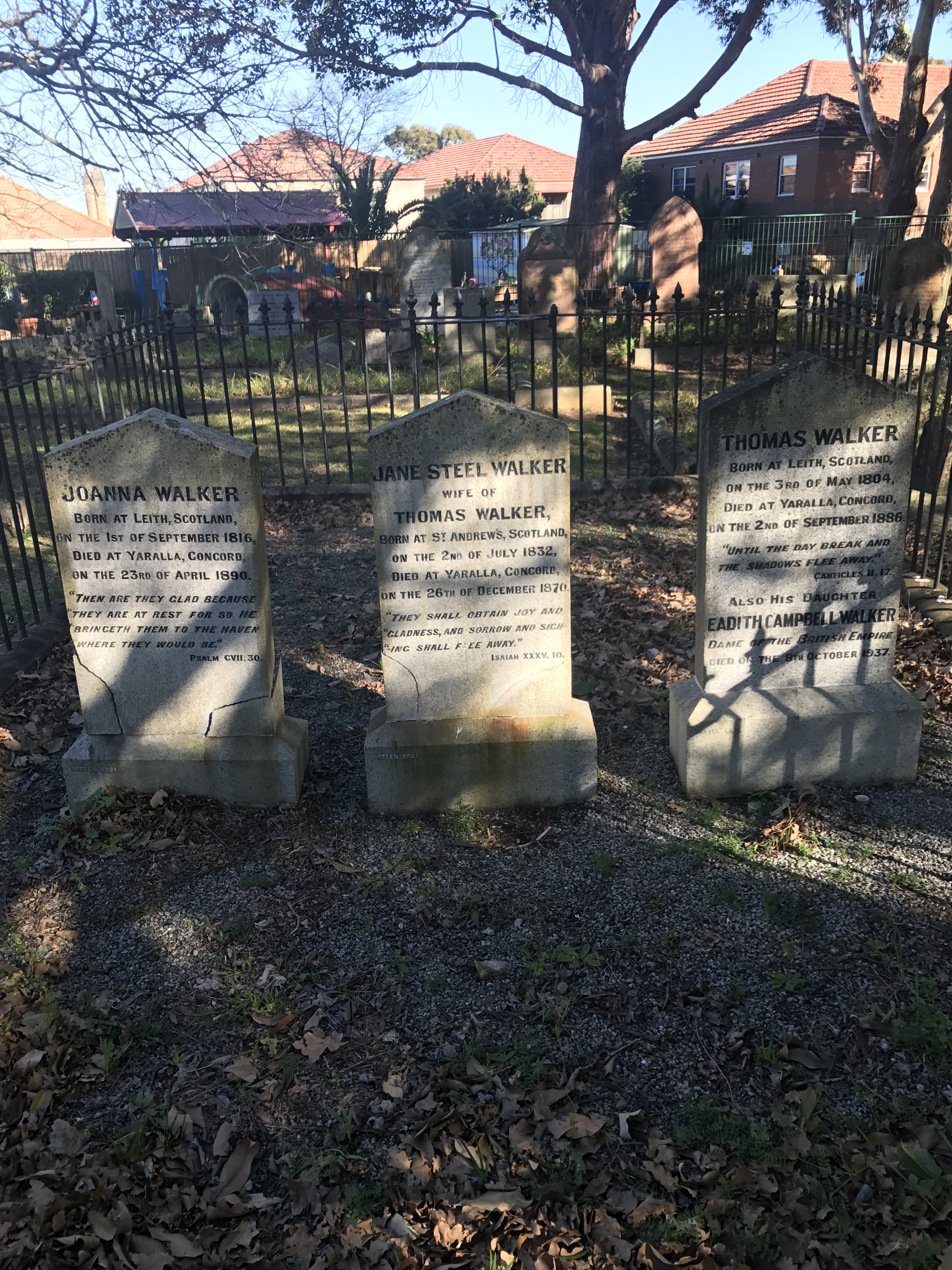
Walker family plot at St John's, Ashfield.

Dame Eadith died on 8 October 1937, aged 76, unmarried. She was cremated at the chapel in Rookwood, and her ashes were buried in the family grave at St John's Ashfield.

After her death, money from her father's estate was put towards the ongoing maintenance of Thomas Walker Hospital, which had been built from 1891–93 with money provided by her father's will. The rest was used to turn Yaralla into the Dame Eadith Walker convalescent home for men. Both Yaralla and the Thomas Walker Hospital (now known as Rivendell Child, Adolescent and Family Unit) are now listed on the Register of the National Estate.

== Sources ==
- J. MacCulloch, 'Walker, Dame Eadith Campbell (1861 - 1937)', Australian Dictionary of Biography, Volume 12, Melbourne University Press, 1990, pp 356–57.
