= Yaralla Estate =

Dame Eadith Walker Hospital
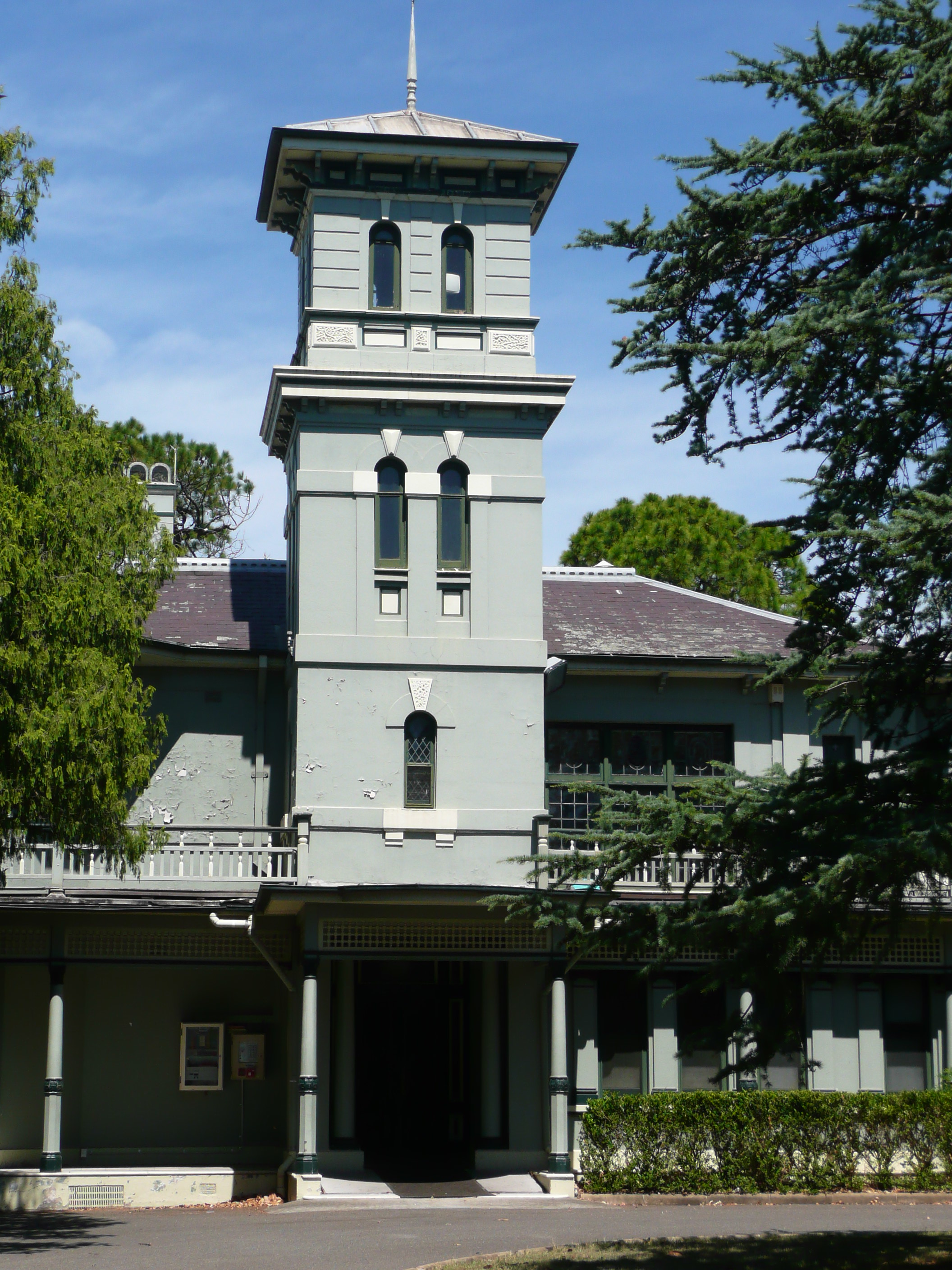
- Yaralla mansion, 2009

Geography
- Location: Concord West, New South Wales, Australia

Organisation
- Care system: Public Medicare (AU)
- Type: Specialist renal dialysis unit

Links
- Lists: Hospitals in Australia
- Building details
- Former names: Yaralla
- Alternative names: Dame Eadith Walker Estate
- Etymology: Eadith Walker

General information
- Type: Original use: residence; repurposed as a repatriation and convalescent hospital
- Architectural style: Victorian Italianate
- Coordinates: 33°50′23.86″S 151°5′56.18″E
- Construction started: 1851
- Completed: 1864
- Owner: Government of New South Wales via the NSW Health under The Walker Trusts Act
- Landlord: Sydney Local Health District

Technical details
- Material: Sandstone
- Floor count: Two
- Grounds: 37 hectares (91 acres)

Design and construction
- Architects: Edmund Blacket; John Sulman (additions)
- Architecture firm: Colonial Architect of New South Wales
- Other designers: George Nichols (Woodbine cottage)

New South Wales Heritage Register
- Official name: Dame Eadith Walker Convalescent Hospital
- Criteria: a., c., e., f., g.
- Designated: 2 April 1999
- Reference no.: 00119

The Yaralla Estate, also known as the Dame Eadith Walker Estate and now home to the Dame Eadith Walker Hospital, is a heritage-listed hospital at The Drive, Concord West in Sydney, New South Wales, Australia.

Yaralla was the home of Eadith Walker and her father Thomas. The estate is historically significant as one of the last large nineteenth-century estates remaining in metropolitan Sydney.

In the 1860s, Thomas Walker commissioned the architect Edmund Blacket to design a home on the shores of the Parramatta River. This Victorian Italianate mansion became the Walker family home. From 1893 to 1899, Eadith Walker built extensions that were designed by the architect John Sulman. A stables and coach house complex were also designed by Sulman at the same time. The entire estate is listed on the New South Wales State Heritage Register and the (now defunct) Register of the National Estate.

Dame Eadith Walker DBE, CBE, who never married, died at Yaralla in 1937 after a long career devoting her life to the Australian Red Cross and a wide range of other philanthropic organisations. Her estate was disposed of in accordance with the terms of her father's will, brought about by the Thomas Walker Trusts Act (1939), a portion of which was set aside to found the Dame Eadith Walker Convalescent Hospital and income from the remainder went to support the hospital, the Thomas Walker hospital and the Yaralla cottages built by Dame Eadith for elderly people in need.

== History ==
=== The Nichols era and the future Yaralla, 1797–1848 ===
The core of the later Yaralla is the promontory in Concord between Majors Bay to the east and what is now Yaralla Bay to the west. The original name for Yaralla Bay was Nichols Bay, and this reflects that the entire promontory was included in a 50-acre land grant to Isaac Nichols in 1797.

Nichols is a good representative example of the able and hard-working convict who successfully rehabilitated himself in the colony. He had been transported for theft and arrived in Sydney at the age of 21 in 1791. After he'd served time as an assigned convict in Major George Johnson's house, Governor John Hunter, impressed by the young man's ability and good behaviour, made him overseer of convict gangs in Sydney and, when his sentence expired in 1797, granted him 50 acres with Parramatta River frontage at Concord on 20 December, with two convict servants to work on the farm. This would later become the site of Yaralla.

Nichols bought 25 acres of land very close to the south from William Harrison for 9 pounds and presumably built huts at once at Concord for his two stockmen. He himself however, acquired an inn, the Jolly Sailor, in George Street in 1798 and soon developed business premises, a shipyard and a stone dwelling on the west side of Circular Quay. There is no evidence for a substantial cottage on Nichols' Concord farm in this early period.

Nichols' advance in the colony suffered a setback when he was found guilty in 1799 of receiving stolen property. It seems likely that he was the victim of the monopolistic ambitions of the New South Wales Corps, with John Macarthur pulling the strings, and Governor Hunter, deeply suspicious of the verdict, referred the case to England. Nichols' name was not cleared until 1802, when the new Governor, Philip Gidley King, was instructed by the British Government to grant him a pardon from the 1799 conviction. Thereafter Nichols became a person of increasing significance, appointed superintendent of public works and the first post-master in 1809.

For the first 4 or 5 years after 1797, Nichols used his Concord property for mixed farming. By 1801 he had cleared only 14 acres of the initial 50 acres and had 18 acres under wheat or maize. He had three horses and no draught oxen. His only other livestock in 1801 consisted of 50 hogs. Within a year he had cleared another 26 acres and was growing a substantial amount of wheat and a lesser amount of barley and maize at Concord. He had three assigned convicts and two free servants, not all necessarily resident at Concord, in 1802.

Nichols began to diversify. In 1803 he had a field of peas at Concord and began to plant fruit trees: by 1805 he had at least one peach tree bearing fruit. The extent and location of the orchard at this period are not known, although it can be assumed to have lain close to Yaralla Bay, where it is shown on the first available plan in 1833.

He was also beginning to build up a herd of cattle and a flock of sheep. In 1805 the farm was attacked by Aboriginal people, who seized the stockmen's "little property and provision" and then "chased and dispersed the stock in all directions". Only one stockman was there at the time and he prudently fled the scene.

Keenly aware of the value of land, he gradually purchased the surrounding lands. Nichols died in 1819 leaving the land in trust for his son George Robert Nichols. George Nichols interests lay elsewhere and in May 1836 he conveyed his interest in the estate to his brother Isaac David Nichols. The Nichols used the land for farming.

During the late 1830s the brothers need for cash encouraged them to mortgage the property several times.

=== The Walker era (1840–1937) ===
In January 1840 George Robert Nichols mortgaged the land to Thomas Walker for 3500 pounds at 15%. In May 1842 he borrowed a further 900 pounds on the security of the property. None of that money was repaid to Walker. In the meantime the remaining title the mortgagor had over the land was conveyed to James Holt, a Sydney merchant.

Walker initiated an Equity Court case against G. R. Nichols and James Holt in May 1843 after he was unable to gain repayment of the loan or obtain possession of the land which constituted the security for the loan. In August 1848 the court awarded title to the land to Walker when neither Nichols or Holt could repay the land.

Walker was a strong critic of the Land Acts of the 1860s which established the principle of free selection before survey. He was a substantial stock owner and had also invested heavily in the pastoral industry. He spent a period as a member of the New South Wales Legislative Council, representing the Port Phillip electorate (which later became the state of Victoria), and as the president of the board of the Bank of NSW. Walker was also an active philanthropist. However, despite his commitment to relieving the poor, he had a hatred of the democratic element in society and was firmly aligned with the view of keeping the poor in their place.

Initially Walker did not move to Concord. However, he ensured the estate was carefully maintained although the gardens and orchards had already fallen into ruins. This was possibly in the 1840s when the Nichols family may have seen little need to maintain an asset which they were in danger of losing particularly while his residence was being planned and built in the 1850s.

Around 1857 architect Edmund Thomas Blacket drew up a set of plans for a cottage at Concord for Thomas Walker, cottage meaning a small country residence. Construction of this cottage, (an Italianate villa) to be known as Yaralla, began. Although the date of completion is not certain, it is probably around 1858–1859. This is also probably the time that Walker moved onto the property permanently.

The house was built in two stages. Construction began in 1851 using stone quarried on the property and was completed in 1864.

Thomas Walker married Jane Hart in 1860 and their only daughter was Eadith Campbell Walker. Jane died in 1870 and Thomas Walker did not remarry. He arranged for his sister Joanna Walker to come to Australia and care for Eadith. Joanna adopted Anne Masefield to serve as a companion to Eadith.

Scottish gardener Alexander Grant was born in 1845 at Cullen, Scotland and served an apprenticeship in the gardens of Cullen House in Banffshire. Before migrating to Australia in 1878 he followed his profession in several Scottish gardens, including the Botanic Gardens in Edinburgh. Grant arrived in the colony in 1878 and worked first at Yaralla, Concord for the Walkers for some considerable time, then at Rosemont, Woollahra for Alexander Campbell MLC, then for Mr Tooth at the Swifts, Darling Point, which he planned and laid out. There is no record of where Grant was living while working at Yaralla and Rosemont, though from 1881 he lived at "Willow Cottage in Point Piper Road - west side (later Ocean Street), Paddington" until he moved to quarters in the Royal Botanic Garden in 1882 for work there. It is likely that the positions at Yaralla and Rosemont both included quarters for a single man and that only after he married Margaret Stevenson in January 1880 was he obliged to find alternative accommodation (Willow Cottage).

When her father died in September 1886 his estate was valued at 937 984 pounds. He left his estate to his daughter, Eadith Walker, but a portion was left to set up the Thomas Walker Convalescent Hospital.

In 1890 his sister Joanna Walker also died, leaving Eadith, who never married, to live the life of a wealthy spinster. Eadith remained living at Yaralla for the rest of her life. She lived alone though surrounded by staff, and during her lifetime she enlarged Yaralla considerably, also building several cottages for retired staff on the property.

Prior to World War I, Eadith had 25 servants and employees living at Yaralla, including a butler, nine maids, cooks, laundresses, chauffeurs, four gardeners, poultry and dairymen, a housekeeper and an engineer who looked after the power station and provision of water.

With Anne now married to architect and planner John Sulman, and construction of the Thomas Walker Convalescent Hospital complete, Eadith and Sulman now turned their attention to Yaralla and planned extensive additions and alterations. These were built between 1893 and 1899. Eadith Walker commissioned Sulman to design additions which were finished in 1899.

Eadith took the opportunity to enjoy herself, but her activities were tempered with a strong streak of benevolence. She contributed financially to the Thomas Walker Convalescent Home and was an active member and contributor to many charitable institutions including further finance for the Thomas Walker Convalescent Home.

Eadith was fond of animals and involved with their protection. An indication of her affection for her own pets was manifested in the private pet cemetery located within the grounds of Yaralla, where her animals were laid to rest.

For a short time, between 1912 and 1914, Yaralla became the residence of the Governor-General of Australia. It was while staying at Yaralla that the governor general, Sir Ronald Munro Ferguson, 1st Viscount Novar, received a cabled warning of the approach of World War I.

Fond of travel, Eadith Walker made a number of trips overseas, bringing back enormous quantities of souvenirs. She bought back enough artefacts from India to require the construction of a special Indian room in Thomas Walker's former office. The Norwegian Cottage, and most of its fittings and furniture, also returned with her from another sortie. It was later re-assembled in the grounds of Yaralla.

The Norwegian Cottage was a product of Eadith's fondness for travel. She brought it back from a trip and had it reassembled on the grounds. The Indian Room was built to house all the artefacts she brought back after a trip to India. This was not the only building to take place during her life at Yaralla. Extensive renovations were made to the estate during the 1890s. These additions and alterations were designed by architect John Sulman, who was married to Eadith's childhood friend, Anne Masefield The alterations to the main house included a new marbled floor entrance hall overlooked by a balcony, a panelled dining hall with a marble and bronze fireplace, an upper storey on the back and extensive balconies on the front. A set of brick and tile stables adorned with square towers, ranging rooflines, gables and a cupola with weathervane were also built.

Eadith maintained Yaralla as a feudal estate and the property contained four bulls, eleven cows, one horse and a quantity of poultry. The paddocks formed an important part of the Estate's rural function from its beginning, providing grazing area for the cattle and horses used in farm activities. Cattle were shown at the Sydney Royal Easter Show and provided milk for the Estate and area for the horses used when buggies were the main form of transportation. The eastern section of the western paddock has been used for housing.

Others simply came to visit, including the powerful and wealthy, regal and vice-regal personages and political figures. Among these were the Prince of Wales, later Edward VII and subsequently the Duke of Windsor who spent a week in Yaralla in 1921. Knowing his liking for squash, Eadith had a court built for his visit, possibly the first in NSW.

Estate workers lived in cottages and were employed in various tasks. These included gardening and maintaining the dairy herd. However, it was a shrinking estate. The Thomas Walker Convalescent Hospital took over a whole peninsula (to Yaralla's west) in the 1890s and in 1917, a sizeable piece of the estate at the head of Major's Bay (to Yaralla's south-east) was transferred to the Concord Golf Club Ltd.

During the First World War she assisted sick and wounded servicemen through the Red Cross and eventually established and maintained a recuperative facility for tubercular veterans in the grounds of Yaralla from 1917 until January 1920. However, she did not restrict herself to these philanthropic activities and regularly held parties for Sydney society members at the estate.

In 1919 the outer part of the estate closest to Concord Road was transferred to the real estate firm King and Humphrey. King and Humphrey offered the first sub-division of Yaralla Estate in June 1920. A large crowd bid for all lots offered until dusk, necessitating a further auction later.

Eadith Walker's benefactions, donations to the Thomas Walker Convalescent Home and construction work at Yaralla took a toll on her finances. The grounds were extraordinary and a lot of time and money had gone into establishing large areas of lawn with native and European trees, rockeries, walks, fountains, ornamental urns and statues, grottos, hot houses, a conservatory, rose gardens and more than a dozen cottages. A power plant the size of a small factory was built, reputedly Sydney's first private generating plant and the Sulman alterations undertaken. At her death in 1937 the estate totalled 265 345 pounds, less than a third of what her father left behind.

The Arthur Walker Reserve to the Estate's south adjoining Majors Bay has been home of the Concord West Cricket Club since 1940 and indicates the patronage of Dame Eadith Walker to local community organisations. Eadith was patron of the club (giving land for their first pitch in 1921 near the railway station, their second near Thomas Walker Hospital and this land in 1935). The Reserve is used predominantly for matches and training and in winter as soccer training ground. The general public also use it for recreation. It is managed by Canada Bay Council and the majority is Council-owned (c.90 %). A small portion on the north eastern side remains a part of Yaralla /Dame Eadith Walker Estate.

Eadith lived in a suite at The Savoy Residential Apartments in Darlinghurst in her later years before returning to Yaralla to die. She died on 8 October 1937. Soon after much of the furniture, fittings, cars, art works and books were sold at a giant auction conducted by James L. Lawson, leading auctioneers in association with Francis de Groot.

=== Dame Eadith Walker Convalescent Hospital (1937–1988) ===
Eadith Walker made several generous bequests in her will and left half of the residue of her estate to trustees for charitable purposes. The Walker Estates Act enabled trustees to purchase Yaralla and its grounds to establish a convalescent home for men, which was vested in the state government. Royal Prince Alfred Hospital was given control of the hospital, to become known as the Dame Eadith Walker Convalescent Hospital, and it was transformed into a Sub-acute Diseases Hospital where patients from the main hospital at Camperdown were sent to recuperate. It was officially opened on 29 June 1940.

The Estate became vested in the Crown under The Walker Trusts Act, 1938 as the Dame Eadith Walker Convalescent Hospital (Yaralla Estate), to be controlled, managed and operated as convalescent and rehabilitation hospitals under the terms of Thomas Walker's will. Sections 19 and 19A of the Walker Trusts Act 1938 provide for the overall control, management and administration of the Yaralla and Rivendell Estates, respectively.

The Yaralla Estate is the largest community bequest of its era (c.37ha) to survive in an intact form in NSW.

The NSW Department of Health (Sydney South West Area Health Service: SSAHS) is the present Crown authority responsible for the control, management and administration of the property.

During the 1970s many of the buildings were demolished and the swimming pool filled in. As late as 1970 the estate was still in the form in which it appeared in the 1930s. In November 1988 the Dame Eadith Walker Convalescent Hospital was closed.

=== 1988–present: Health-related uses and public parkland ===
Since 1988 the estate has remained in use for health-related purposes, managed by the Sydney South West Area Health Service (now the Sydney Local Health District). These have included use of the main house as a Renal Dialysis Training Centre Unit (1993–2008) and of Magnolia Cottage as the Kalparrin Day Centre, a day care unit for patients with dementia (2003+).

The main mansion was used for some years as a kidney dialysis unit before being refurbished c.2011 as a Palliative Care Unit. This unit incorporated a 20-bed sub-acute inpatient palliative care unit and clinical and non-clinical support services and associated infrastructure. This unit continues to provide services for persons with HIV, Dementia and other conditions.

On 28 August 2013, the NSW Department of Health announced by media release that 13ha of Yaralla's estate would be made public parkland.

The Yaralla Estate Community Advisory Committee was established in late 2013. Its role is to advise the chief executive of the Sydney Local Health District on maintaining and using the estate for the benefit of the Local Health District and the community. It has a defined role and terms of reference, including advising the trustee in developing and reviewing its plans and policies for the estate, monitoring and evaluating uses of the estate, maintaining and promoting the integrity of the heritage values of the estate.

In November 2016, the refurbished gate house, Hyacinth Cottage hosted its first family of a burns patient to live in, while remaining close to Concord Hospital for follow-up care. Concord Hospital is part of the NSW Statewide Burns Injury Service, with many patients coming from regional, rural, remote and overseas locations for specialised care. The refurbished Hyacinth Cottage residence allows the Burns unit to discharge eligible patients, encourage them to continue their recovery in a supportive home environment and ensure they continue to have access to multidisciplinary care.

== Description ==
=== Estate ===
The Dame Eadith Walker Estate comprises approximately 37 hectares (Sydney South West Area Health Service state the area as 50 acres/20.3ha of land, comprising a peninsula fronting the Parramatta River at Concord. It is a large estate which retains its rural elements such as grazing fields with horses, former orchard and vegetable garden areas (now lawn), extensive garden layout including parkland, rose garden, picking garden, extensive grotto work, a rockery, former tennis/croquet lawn, former swimming pool (in-filled and now lawn) and Italian lawn terrace. It also contains sporting and recreation facilities, such as the former swimming pool, tennis court/croquet green and a squash court.

The Estate is made up of a number of clusters of farm and service buildings and structures. The grounds in their heyday were extraordinary and a lot of time and money went into establishing large areas of lawn with a rich range of native and European trees, rockeries, walks, fountains, ornamental urns and statues, grottos, hot houses, a conservatory, rose gardens and more than a dozen cottages, scattered across the grounds.

Unlike the garden at its companion Thomas Walker Convalescent Hospital (Concord, on the next peninsula to the west) which was purpose-designed for an institutional building, the garden at Yaralla was designed as a high maintenance domestic garden for social gatherings. Whilst a lack of maintenance has meant some regrettable losses - the now in-filled swimming pool, the lost Indian room and Norwegian house, it remains largely intact.

Various conservation works to elements of the estate and garden have brought the garden and grounds to a high level of condition, considering the more constrained and focused use of resources of recent decades.

=== Biodiversity ===
Yaralla has natural and cultural heritage significance for its biodiversity, which includes introduced and native flora and fauna. It is an important element in the health of the Parramatta River Catchment and its site is of significance, given it includes three endangered ecological communities: Coastal Saltmarsh in areas of mangrove bordering the Parramatta River banks; Swamp-oak Floodplain Forest; and Sydney Turpentine-Ironbark Forest - the latter forming two areas of remnant bushland which are otherwise rare regionally.

As well it has richly planted grounds, with a diverse mixture of introduced and native species of plants. These attract and provide food, fibre and habitat for an equally rich assortment of fauna, from microscopic: insects, soil fungi etc. to large and obvious: birds, possums, humans.

Bushland areas

The estate has two areas of remnant bushland which are otherwise rare regionally:

- a) Swamp-oak Floodplain Forest (swamp oak being Casuarina cunninghamiana, river or swamp oak); and
- b) Sydney Turpentine-Ironbark Forest (turpentine being Syncarpia glomulifera; ironbark being narrow-leaved ironbark, Eucalyptus crebra.

These bushland remnants and the mangrove community are home to numerous threatened fauna which depend on their conservation.

Dame Eadith Walker Estate and Thomas Walker Estate were recently described as 'joint jewels in the City of Canada Bay's biodiversity crown' in a report by InSight Ecology (2014). This detailed report was a study of the indigenous fauna of the City of Canada Bay Local Government Area can be found on the City of Canada Bay Council's website and the Sydney Local Health District's Yaralla website. The City of Canada Bay Council also has reports on bush regeneration and vegetation management at Yaralla which can be accessed via the council. Some species that inhabit the Yaralla Estate include a spectacular array of birdlife including honey eaters, wrens, parrots and more, a variety of mammals and a rare remnant of the endangered ecological community, Sydney Turpentine-Ironbark Forest.

=== Driveway ===
The Drive, now a street in suburban Concord, once belonged to the Yaralla estate, running all the way west to Concord Road. Today's estate driveway runs from the intersection of The Drive and Nullawarra Avenue.

The formal outer entry gates are iron, with stone pillars, and a palisade fence. One of the estate cottages sits on the northern side of the main gates, doubling as a gate house.

An impressive entrance driveway avenue leads from Concord Road (it is now a suburban street called 'The Drive') and across into the estate east of Nullawarra Avenue. This is composed of brush box (Lophostemon confertus) (with the occasional eucalypt exception) and runs from the entrance gates between grassed west and east paddocks (still containing horses) leading to the inner set of gates, stables and parkland garden.

=== Garden ===
The estate contains a relatively intact Victorian and Edwardian layout and structure of a large suburban estate. It retains key elements including buildings and landscape, such as its fields, outer (informal) and inner (more formal) gardens, outbuildings, yards and working areas, cottages, terraces, power house, jetties, walks etc. The garden and grounds contain a rich array of Edwardian and Victoria era garden features, some in very good condition, some revitalised in recent years, some more neglected due to lack of maintenance.

An inner set of iron gates and fence leads the drive past the elaborate brick stables/gate house (on the right /east) and into the garden, bordered by shrubberies on both sides and going past the rose garden (on its right/east) past the Dairy (former stables) and working yards and sheds (behind a hedge and shrubbery) to the house which is towards the estate's north-eastern side - closer to the tip of the peninsular.

Mixed shrubbery borders lining both sides along and the central island within the inner drive (within the inner set of gates) are richly planted with a mixture of old fashioned shrubs, small trees, succulents, some dramatic such as variegated Mauritius hemp (Furcraea selloa 'Variegata'), bulbs and perennials. A rare tropical trumpet creeper climber, Distictis buccinatoria grows over a frame near the rose garden. Underplantings have been revived and some replaced in the 1990s including widespread use of Nile/African lilies, (Agapanthus orientalis).

To the south of the house is a service yard and outbuildings.

A carriage loop lies west of the house's main entrance facade, which is crowned by an Italianate tower.

Next to (to the left of) the house's entrance front the verandah gives onto a broad path and lawns reaching down to the north to clumps of giant bamboo from which a broad grassed walk, bordered on its higher side with elaborate concrete grotto-work, leads from the site of the jetty round the shore line to a shelter house also of concrete grotto-work beside the site of the swimming pool (now filled and grassed over). Steps amid further grotto-work lead to an upper (croquet or tennis?) lawn overlooked by an Italianate balustraded terrace (east of the house), with formal flower beds and fountain, before the third (east) front of the house (and the site of the Indian room, demolished 1972), and conservatory). A bay window on the house's eastern facade looks into this Italianate garden, with Indian pines, urns and terracing.

The grotto on the lower lawn area where formerly was a semi-natural swimming pool, is perhaps the largest in Australia, and contains a rich collection of plants, including and featuring palms, cycads, xeriphytes such as pony tail palms (Nolina sp.), rare species of climber/trailer such as Trachelospermum sp., rare succulents such as Euphorbia grandidens, other unusual succulents such as Agave and Aloe spp., etc.

A picking garden area lies south-west of the rose garden, hedged, but is not kept up. It is now grassed, giving little indication of the intensity with which it would once have been planted, pruned and maintained. Some random NSW Christmas bushes (Ceratopetalum gummiferum) pruned into coppices give a slight hint of its former use. These would have been cut for table arrangements.

The rose garden has been moved slightly south of its original position due to mature trees shading the original area. It is south-west of the house, plumbago-hedged (Plumbago capensis), is formally planned with a sandstone sundial and two "crinkle" wire trellised curved "cylinder" arbours running along the sandstone flagged "crazy" paved paths. This garden was replanted in the 1990s.

The garden contains much maturespecimen and border tree and shrub planting on a grand scale - clumps of giant bamboo (Bambusa balcooa) near its "water gate", trees such as Himalayan/deodar cedars (Cedrus deodara), Araucaria pines, Queensland kauri pines (Agathis robusta), Moreton Bay figs (Ficus macrophylla), several funeral cypresses (Cupressus funebris), remnant indigenous turpentines (Syncarpia glomulifera), various palms (such as Washingtonia robusta - California desert fan palm; Howea forsteriana - the Lord Howe Island palm), bird of paradise 'trees' (Strelitzia nicolai), the rare gunstock tree (Scolopia braunii) near the house's service courtyard, desert wilga (Geijera parviflora), various orchid trees (Bauhinia x variegata), camphor laurels (Cinnamomum camphora), strawberry tree (Arbutus unedo), Himalayan chir pines (Pinus roxburghii) east of the house, etc.

It also contains a number of old-fashioned flowering and evergreen shrubs, such as a rare hybrid coral tree (Erythrina x camdeni 'Bidwillii') just inside the inner set of gates, Chinese hibiscus (Hibiscus rosa-sinensis cv.), oleanders, (Nerium oleander cv.s), Indian hawthorn (Rhaphiolepis delacouri), sweet box (Murraya paniculata) and also herbaceous plants, such as star jasmines (Trachelospermum - several species, some rare - e.g. on the grotto), succulents (especially on the grotto), etc.

The sunken garden north-west of the house was replanted in the early 1990s with predominantly dwarf mondo grass but retains its form and intended character.

=== Buildings ===
Major buildings on the site include:-

Yaralla

Yaralla is a large asymmetrical two storey Victorian Italianate building with a 4-storey tower over the front door, smaller octagonal towers at its corners, verandahs and projecting bay windows at corners. It has an Indian influence to the verandahs. Ornamentation is confined to balconies and verandahs, including simple mouldings.

Jonquil

Cottage - Single storey Californian Bungalow style dwelling with a series of gabled roofs and prominent entry porch and tall chimneys. The exterior walls are brick with continuous roughcast above window level and to gables, porch and verandah piers. The roof tiles are terracotta and the chimneys brick.

Hyacinth

Cottage - A single storey dwelling of Californian Bungalow style. The exterior walls are brick with roughcast above window head height, terracotta roof tiles and timber framed windows. The interior walls are cement rendered with timber floors and fibrous plaster ceilings.

Boronia

Cottage - A single storey cottage with a dominant hipped and gabled roof. The exterior has a tiled roof, brick walls, timber shingles to the gables and timber framed windows. The interior contains plasterboard ceilings, rendered and plastered walls and carpet.

Woodbine (Azalea)

Cottage - Timber-framed cottage with simple hipped roof and verandah at front and lean-to with skillion roof and verandah at rear. The exterior features a corrugated iron roof, timber weatherboards to walls, timber framed windows and brick chimneys. Floors inside are timber and lath and plaster walls and ceilings are found in the front portion of the house.

Annex to Woodbine

A simple cottage forming an addition to Woodbine with a hipped and flat roof configuration. It contains a living area, two smaller rooms and a bathroom. The exterior has a corrugated asbestos cement roof, timber weatherboard wall lining and timber framed windows. Asbestos cement wall linings, fibrous plaster ceiling linings, timber floors and tiles to bathroom floor are found inside.

Magnolia

Cottage - A single storey cottage with dominant hipped and gabled roof and distinctive verandah. The exterior features brick walls, terracotta roof tiles, timber shingles to the gables and timber framed windows. The interior has timber floors, cement render and set plaster to walls and a fibrous plaster ceiling. Extensions were made to the east and west side of this cottage in 2003 to accommodate a new use as a day care dementia clinic facility.

Stables complex

A group of buildings arranged around a central court with a rich assortment of decorative elements - towers, lanterns, a clock and dormer windows - and includes a horse enclosure and two flats. The roof tiles are terracotta and the walls brick with cement render and timber to the gables. The windows are framed with timber and stone flagging leads to the court. The courtyard is paved in sandstone blocks. Elaborate timberwork lines the horse boxes.

Laundry and substation block

Two storey structure with gabled roof, chimneys and decorative fretted bargeboards and belfry on the eastern wall. The roof has terracotta tiles with a metal ridge and the brick walls are rendered and coursed to resemble stone. The inside walls are rendered and the ceilings and floors are constructed with timber. The floor over the substation area is timber.

Squash court

A rectilinear building with hipped roof featuring patent glazed roof lights and gablets and an observation area accessed by an external stair. The outside walls are brick with timber framed windows and timber shingles to the observation area. The roof is constructed of terracotta tiles with glazed panels. The interior walls are cement rendered. The roof trusses are exposed timber with timber weatherboard ceiling lining.

High stone wall

Random coursed high sandstone wall with brick coursing and dressed sandstone copings at its apex. It is covered with thick vegetation on the western side.

Sea wall

Sandstone wall of random sized stones at the edge of the tidal zone, with some rough cement bonding and integrated with the naturally occurring rock.

Sheds and animal (pig, chicken and fowl) enclosures are generally roofed with terracotta tiles and have walls of timber or brick construction

=== Condition ===
The building was reported as being in good condition externally and internally as at February 2009.

Unlike the garden at Thomas Walker Convalescent Hospital, designed for an institutional building, the garden at Yaralla, designed as a high maintenance garden for social gatherings, has suffered from its later/more recent use and lack of maintenance. The available maintenance makes it impossible to present the garden in the style for which it was designed, although with the exception of the architectural features, the Norwegian house and the Indian Room's regrettable losses - and that of the now infilled swimming pool, the layout appears quite intact.

The European archaeological potential was assessed as good as at 1 January 1993, while the Aboriginal archaeological potential was assessed as poor.

=== Modifications and dates ===
- 1893-99 - Alterations to Yaralla and construction of Stable Complex - John Sulman. The verandahs, court and tower at entry are heavily modified.
- C.1901 - Swimming Pool constructed
- 1907 - Indian Room built and garage constructed
- 1917 - Portion of estate transferred to Concord Golf Club Ltd.
- 1919 - Outer part of estate transferred to Charles King and Frederick Humphrey.
- 1920 - First Subdivision offered by auction.
- 1940 converted to a convalescent home for men
- 1970 - 80 - Demolition of various buildings and structures, including:- Norwegian Cottage, Indian Room, Gate lodge (Camelia) & Dahlia, Fuchsia, Gardenia and Lavender cottages, the swimming pool filled in
- 1993: Adapted for use as a Dialysis Training Centre in the main house
- c.2000 grotto tidied up / scraped over, and replanted
- 2003 - recycle the former site engineer's (Magnolia) cottage (which is currently unoccupied) to serve as the "Kalparrin Dementia Day Care Centre".
- 2007 - Italian balustrade on terrace east of house restored by Concord Heritage Society
- 2008 - NSW Health announced its decision to move the Dialysis Training Centre to a larger, purpose-built premises at Royal Prince Alfred Hospital in Camperdown. The DTC moved to the new premises in mid-2008, leaving the Dame Eadith Walker Hospital vacant.
- 2013–14 - House refurbished to accommodate statewide supported accommodation for HIV/Dementia patients;

Various repairs have been conducted in recent years, including maintenance works to Boronia Cottage and The Stables, stone balustrade repairs in 2006, and repairs to the main gates.

== Heritage listing ==
The Dame Eadith Walker Estate is of outstanding cultural significance for NSW. It comprises a unique complex of 19th- and early 20th-century buildings in an essentially rural landscape setting and is an exceptionally rare complete example of a large Edwardian private residential estate in Australia and one in close proximity to the city. The estate has direct historical links with the early days of the colony of NSW and is strongly associated with an important mercantile and philanthropic family.

The estate contains an exceptional group of late 19th-century buildings, some of them rare examples, which clearly demonstrate the workings of a farm of this period. Its core is a substantial Italianate villa designed by Edmond Blacket & John Sulman and also of architectural and historical significance for its associations with Thomas Walker, a prominent Australian. It is of great significance for its landscape, as an intact estate on the Parramatta River, with extensive mature mangroves fringing the shore and mature plantings in an extensive but deteriorated garden. The estate has a large collection of rare and important trees and shrubs, many over a century old, some of individual botanical and horticultural significance and rarity as well as herbaceous and climbing plant specimens. Whilst not of exceptional design, as a component of the estate the garden with its extensive late Victorian or Edwardian grotto-work, picking, flower garden and entertaining areas is of much interest, and demonstrates a lost way of life.

Yaralla Estate was listed on the New South Wales State Heritage Register on 2 April 1999 having satisfied the following criteria.

The place is important in demonstrating the course, or pattern, of cultural or natural history in New South Wales.

The Dame Eadith Walker Estate is a unique complex of buildings and landscape elements which is of outstanding significance as a large, self-sufficient private residential estate and has a strong association with an important mercantile and philanthropic family of the nineteenth and early twentieth century.

Yaralla House represents the work of two of Australia's major 19th-century architects, Edmund Blacket and John Sulman. It is evidence of changing living patterns during the nineteenth century and into the twentieth century.

The Estate is significant in the evolving pattern of the colony starting as a grant to an ex-convict, through to a colonial gentleman's residence and early 20th-century residence of an important philanthropic woman, Dame Eadith Walker. The Estate is also important evidence of early settlement in the Concord area.

The place is important in demonstrating aesthetic characteristics and/or a high degree of creative or technical achievement in New South Wales.

The group of buildings comprising the Dairy Complex, Stables Complex, Boronia Cottage, Magnolia Cottage, Pig Enclosure, Chicken Enclosure and Fowl Enclosure are architecturally consistent and unified with strong visual, physical and historical links.

The place has potential to yield information that will contribute to an understanding of the cultural or natural history of New South Wales.

The Dame Eadith Walker Estate has botanical and scientific significance as a large collection of rare and important trees and shrubs on a large residential estate, many having existed in this location for over a century. A number of specimens have individual botanical importance for their rarity.

Many archaeological remains exist on the Estate which have the potential, through archaeological analysis, to provide further information on the cultural heritage and lifestyle of the previous occupants of the Estate.

The existence of the foundations of demolished buildings is significant in that they provide physical evidence of the location of previous structures and add a dimension to the interpretation of the site as a whole.

The group of buildings comprising the Dairy Complex, Stable Complex, Boronia Cottage, Magnolia Cottage, Pig Enclosure, Chicken Enclosure and Fowl Enclosure, form an exceptional group of late nineteenth-century buildings which clearly demonstrate the workings of a farm of this period.

The place possesses uncommon, rare or endangered aspects of the cultural or natural history of New South Wales.

Contains rare examples of particular structures and is an exceptionally rare example of a large Edwardian private residential estate in Australia.

The place is important in demonstrating the principal characteristics of a class of cultural or natural places/environments in New South Wales.

The Dame Eadith Walker Estate is representative of a large suburban 19th-century estate, with relatively intact Victorian and Edwardian estate layout and structure, key elements including buildings and landscape including fields, more natural areas and a large garden.

The estate is also representative of the pattern of estate accumulation and to a lesser extent subdivision, and the change from a rural or semi-rural to a suburban setting over the 20th century.

The garden is representative of large, 19th- and early 20th-century gentry estate gardens, with a range of features including sporting facilities, swimming pool, grotto, sunken garden, rose garden, picking garden and a large collection of trees, shrubs and herbaceous plants. It is also representative of gentry estates which were used for social occasions, such as parties and gatherings, playing a role in the wider community as well as for estate workers and their families.

== Gallery ==
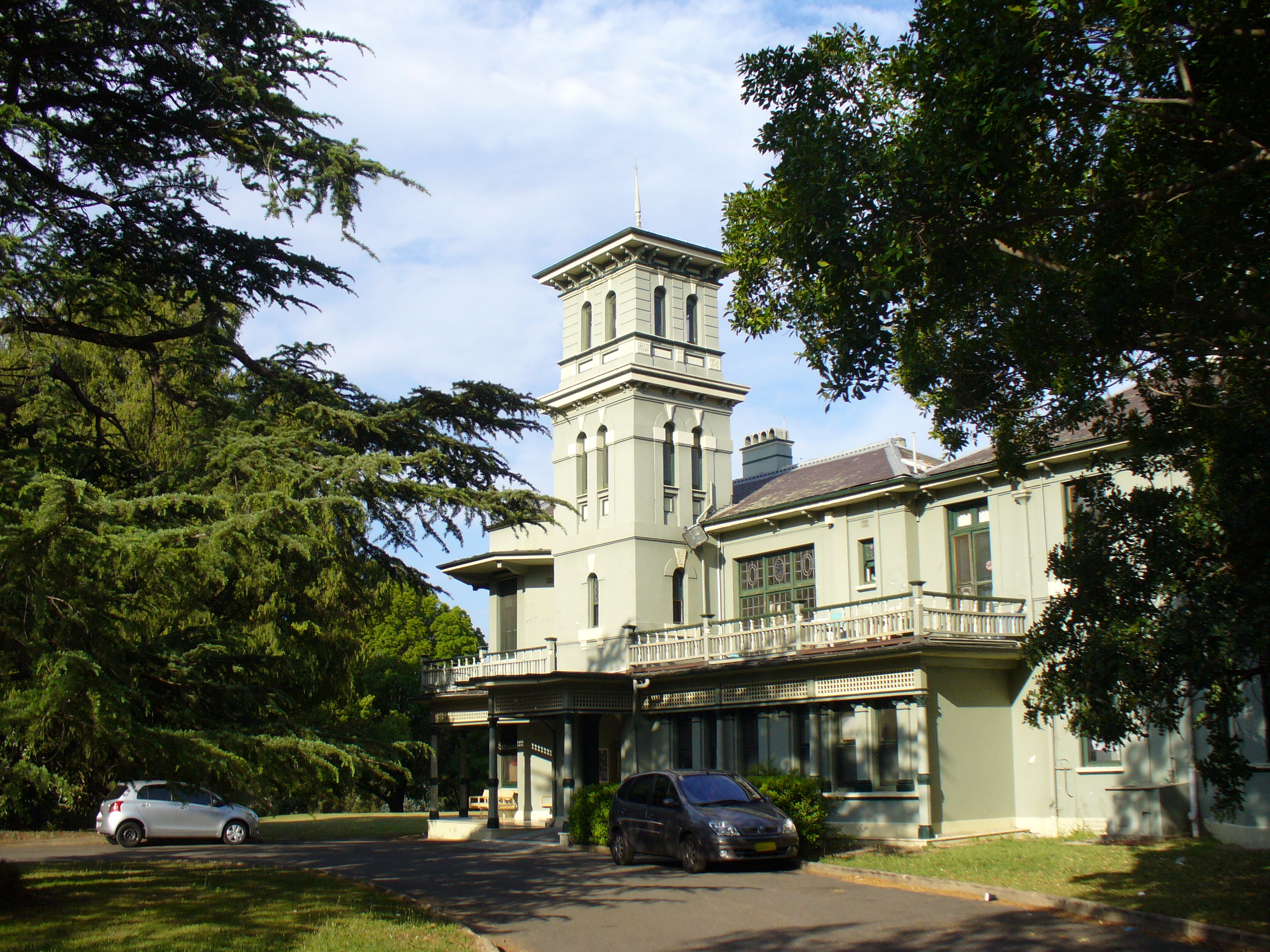
Yaralla Mansion, 2007

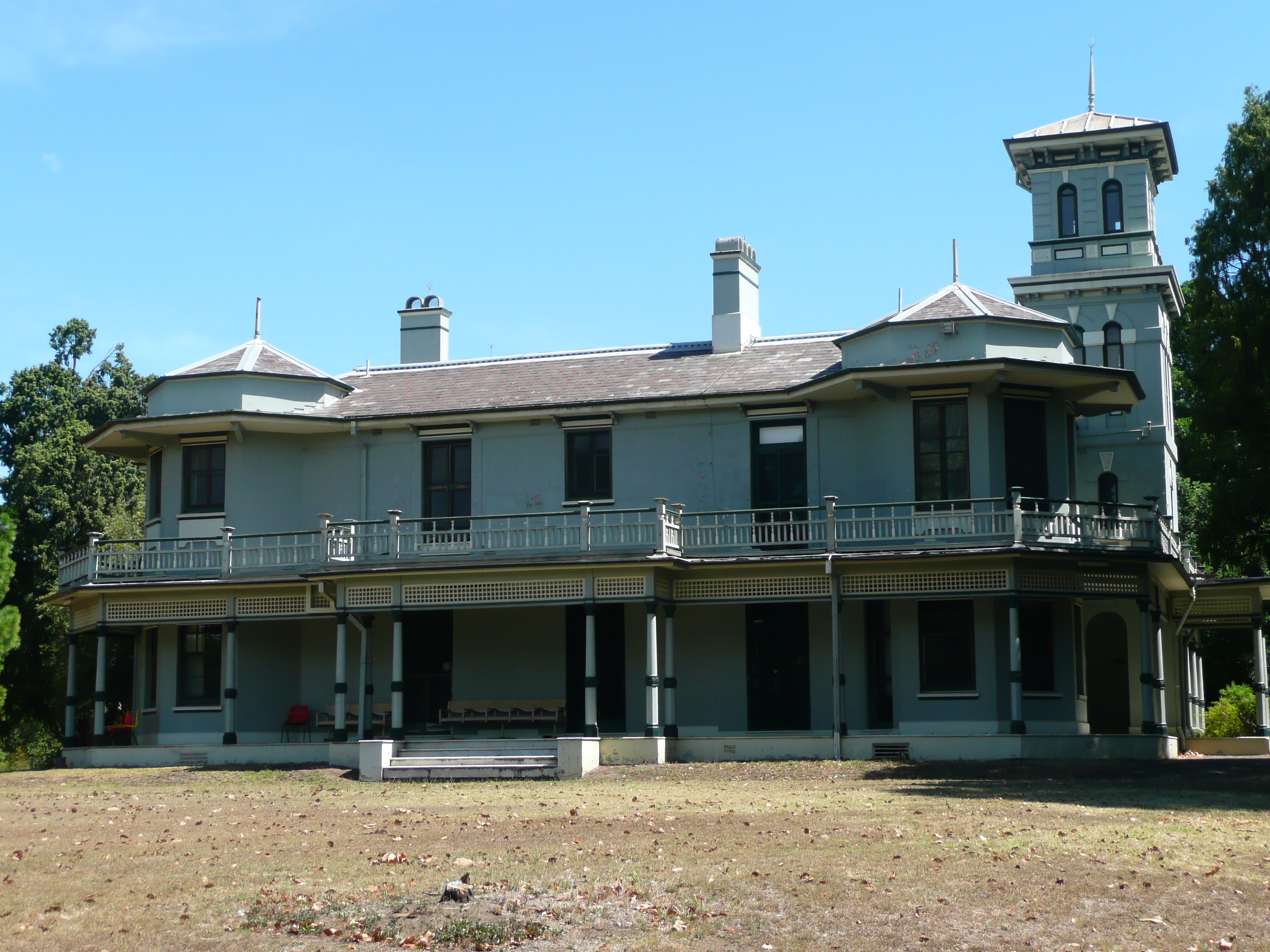
North side of the house

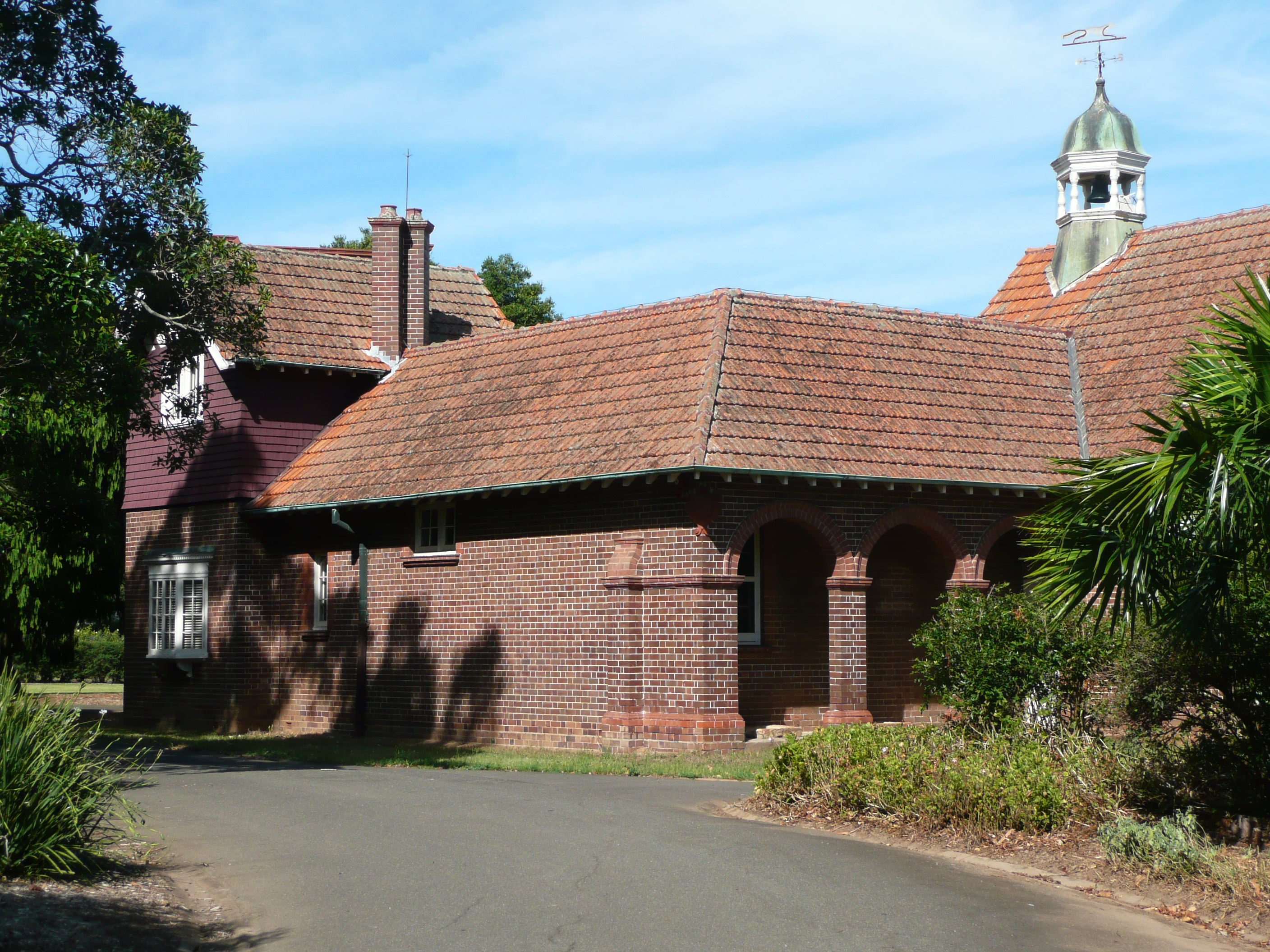
Yaralla stables, designed by John Sulman

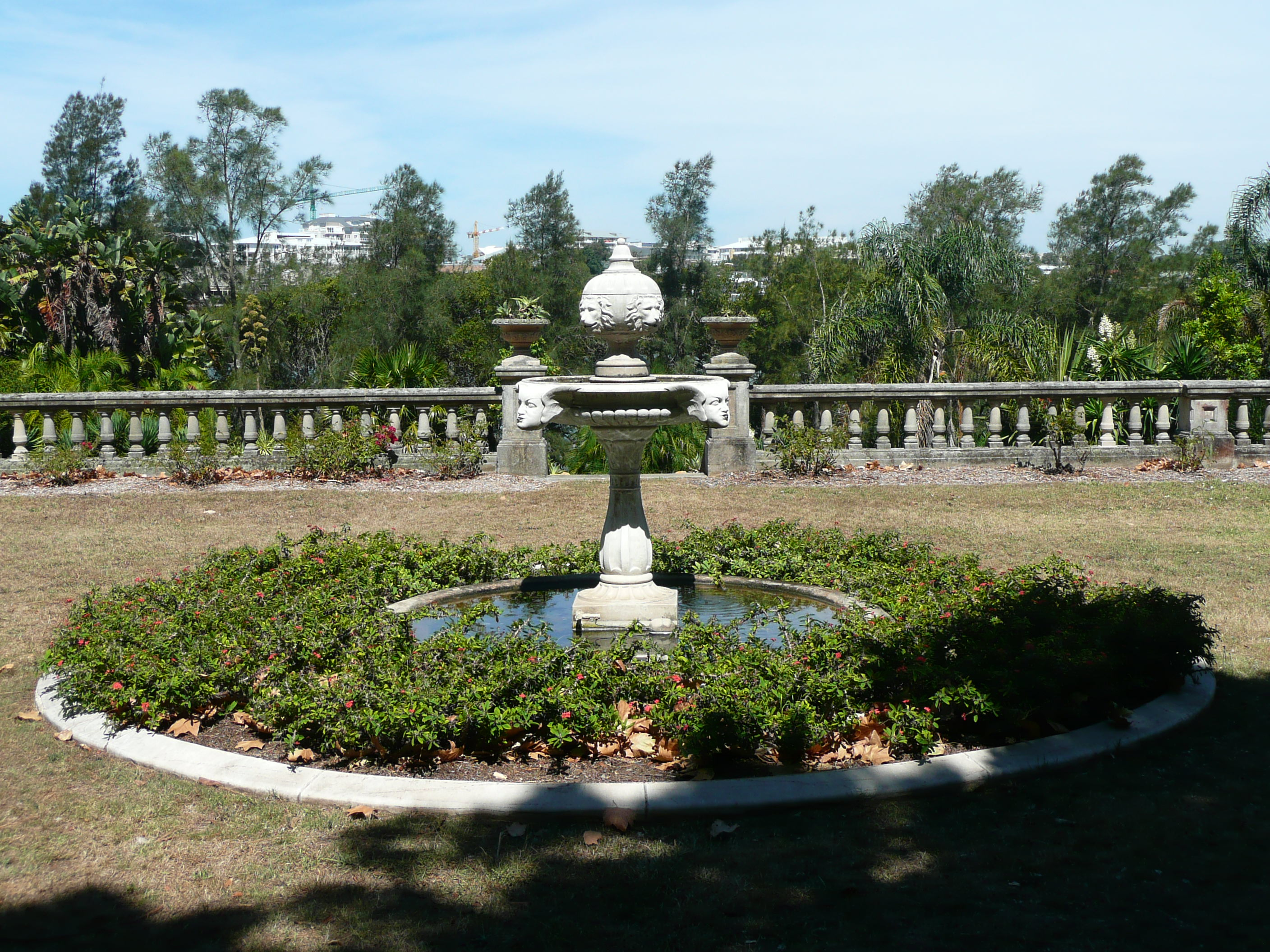
Yaralla grounds

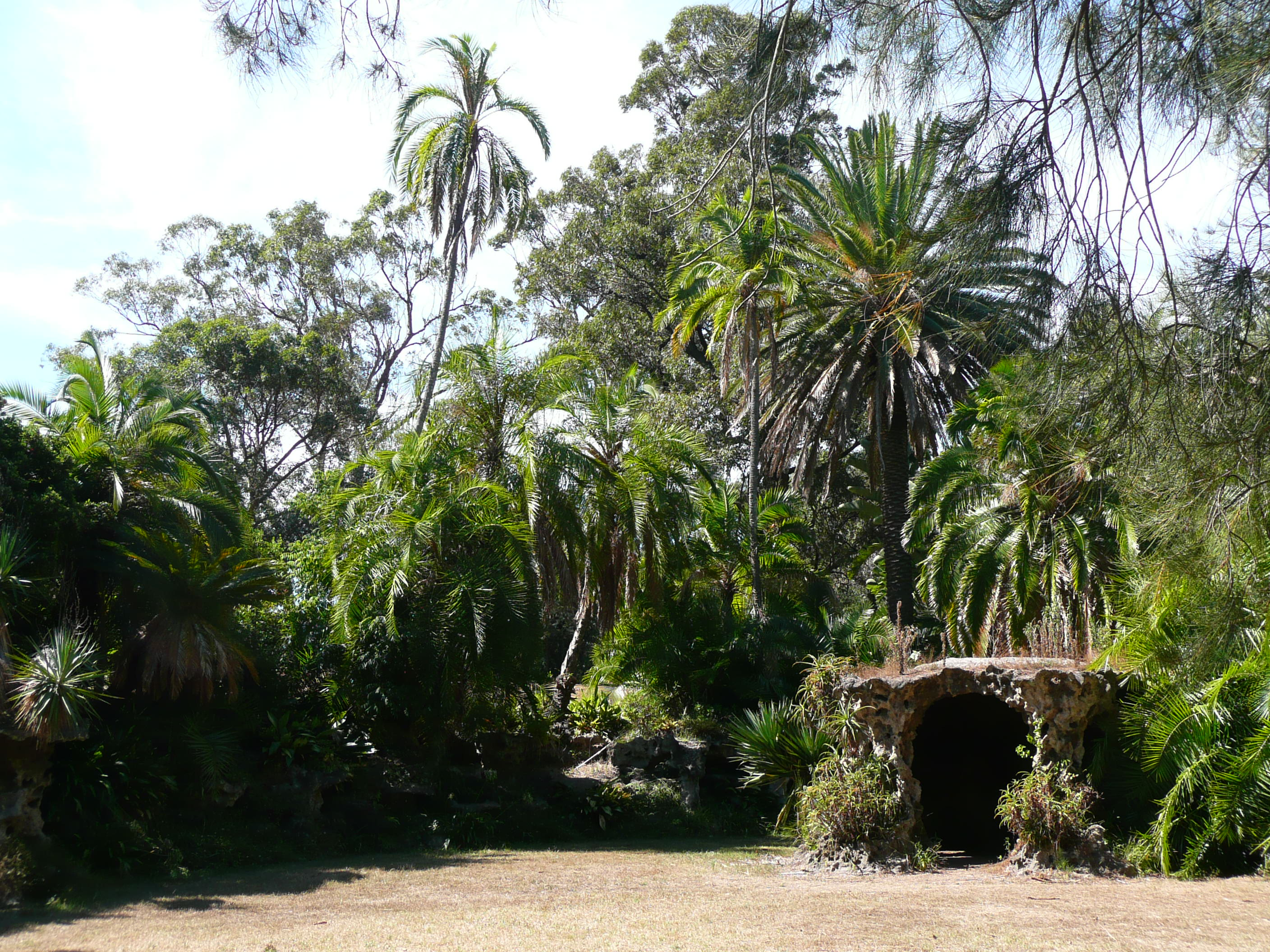
Grotto at former site of swimming pool

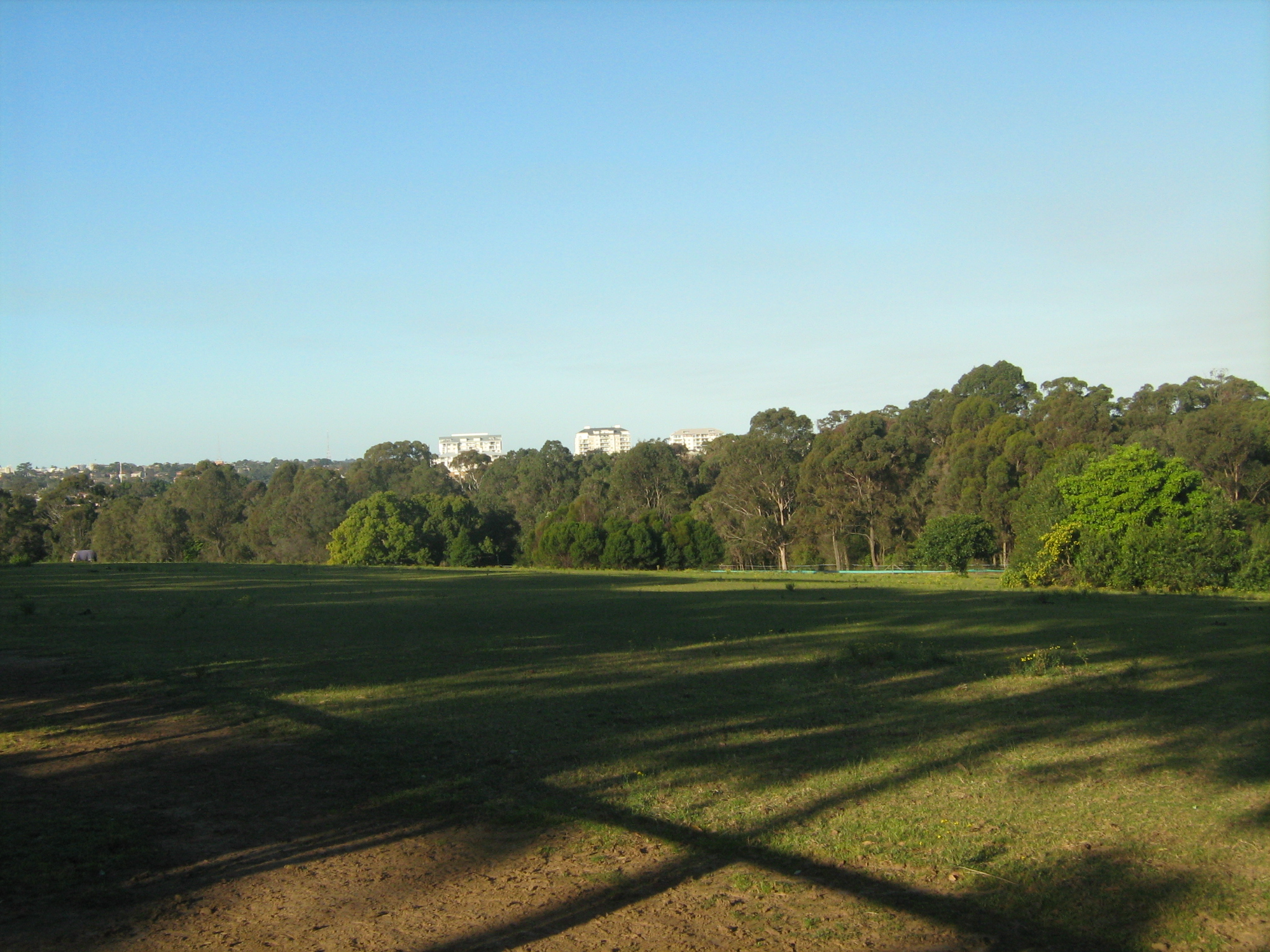
Yaralla Estate field and Turpentine forest

== See also ==
- List of hospitals in New South Wales
