= Trust Building =

Building in Sydney, Australia

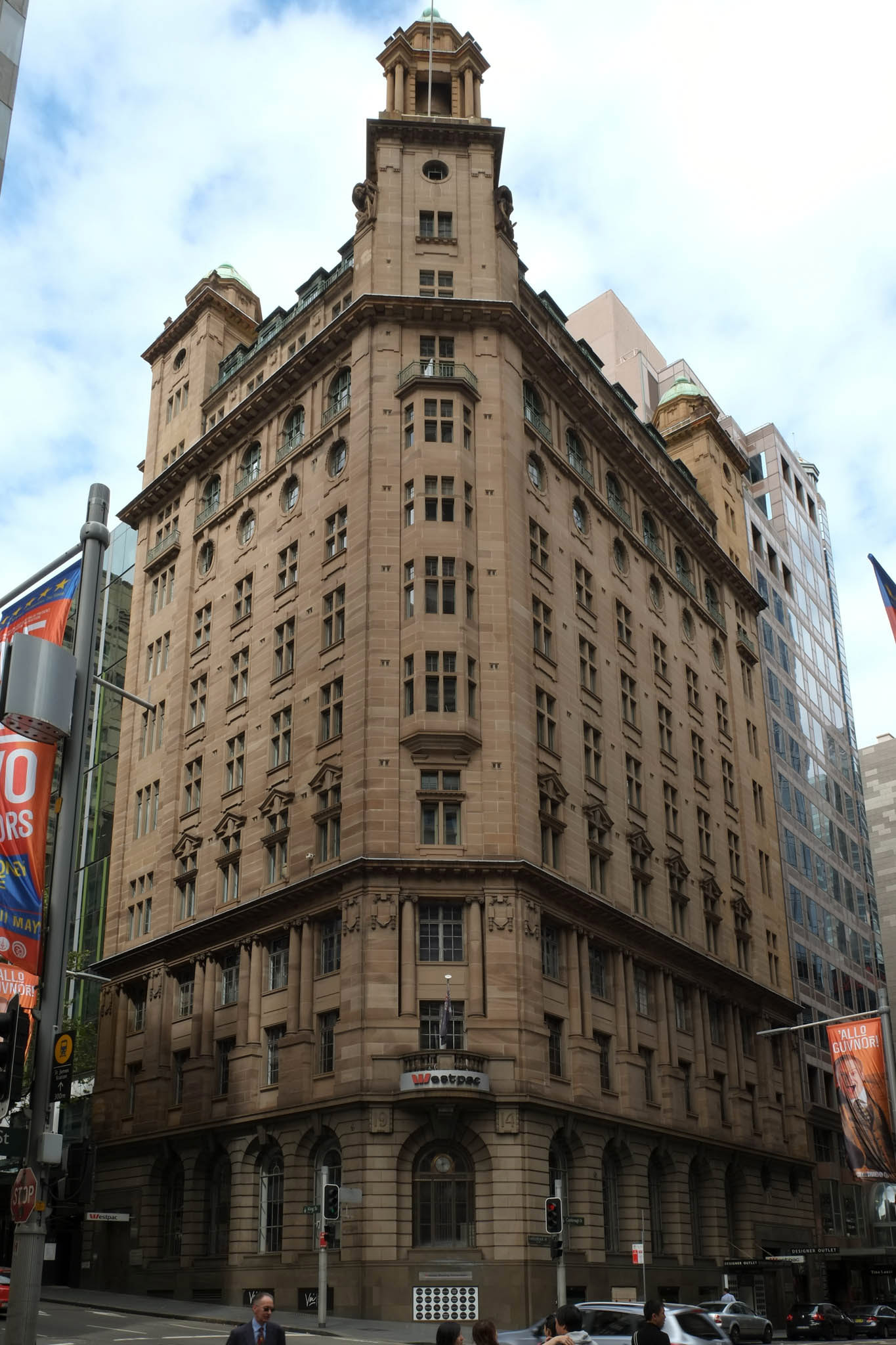
- The Trust building pictured in 2013

- Location within Sydney Location within Australia
- 33.8693°S 151.2099°E
- Location: 72-72a Castlereagh Street, Sydney central business district, City of Sydney, New South Wales, Australia

History
- Built: 1914–1916
- Built for: Office of The Daily Telegraph

Site notes
- Architect(s): Robertson & Marks
- Architectural style: Interwar Commercial Palazzo

New South Wales Heritage Register
- Official name: Trust Building
- Type: State heritage (built)
- Designated: 2 April 1999
- Reference no.: 676
- Type: Historic site
- Builders: Stuart Brothers

The Trust Building is a heritage-listed office and commercial building and former hotel located at 72-72a Castlereagh Street, in the Sydney central business district, in the City of Sydney local government area of New South Wales, Australia. It was designed by firm Robertson & Marks and built from 1914 to 1916 by Stuart Brothers. It was added to the New South Wales State Heritage Register on 2 April 1999.

== History ==
The Trust Building was constructed between 1914 and 1916 to home the offices of The Daily Telegraph, the leading broadsheet newspaper of the day. The building was designed by the architectural firm Robertson and Marks in the Interwar Commercial Palazzo style. The building was erected by the Stuart Brothers. The foundation stone for the Trust Building was laid by the president of The Daily Telegraph newspaper company, J. Randall Carey, in February 1914. The Daily Telegraph began operations within the building in 1916 and the first tenant occupied the upper floors in 1917.

The original designs of the building incorporated all the functions of a newspaper production office. The basement floors were occupied by giant printing machines that could be seen working from the street through small windows. The main entrance to the building was at the corner and it opened into a large advertising hall. The Daily Telegraph offices remained at the Trust Building until 1929, when the newspaper relocated following its sale to Associated Newspapers Limited. After the newspaper left the building, floors 5-8 were leased to various architects, dentists and financiers with the majority of the offices going to solicitors. Pastoralist and entrepreneur Sir Rupert Clarke leased out the 7th floor. Following the 1929 newspaper relocation, the building was purchased by a Sydney consortium named King Street Freehold Ltd., which set up the Hotel Savoy there in 1929.

The building was refurbished from designs by Ross and Rowe. The lower ground floor became a two level bar in the "Spanish architecture style" of the time. The ground floor became the main lounge and the upper floor was divided into smaller rooms where bathrooms were added. There was also a lounge room added to each floor. The original corner entrance was removed and a side street entrance was constructed.

The Hotel Savoy failed three years later at the height of the Great Depression. The Trust Building was then sold and became the insurance premises for the Southern British National Trust after it was refurbished by the architect Samuel Lipson. New entrances were added at both King and Castlereagh Streets and the lower floors were remodelled in polished trachyte. The new interior was in the "Art Deco" style. Other additions to the building included a new conference room, banking chamber and upper storey corridors. The remaining interior fabric of the building up until the last recorded survey in February to April 1989 is from this time. All this work was completed by 1934 and the building was named the Trust Building. In 1936 the building was bought by the Bank of New South Wales, which later became Westpac as part of an amalgamation.

Architects Robertson and Marks were reassigned to the building. They added lower ground floor shops including Cornelius Furs which was still present there in 1989 at the time of the last survey. Auxiliary columns and an electrical substation were added to the basement in 1938.

In 1985 new classical lift interiors were installed. The lift lobbies have been altered by the installation of new lift doors and surrounds. The clocks and bronze indication frieze have been partially reproduced to resemble the Trust Building's appearance in 1934. Minor repairs and alterations have continued to occur up until 1989 at the time of the last survey of the building. Tenants, primarily solicitors and jewellers, have remained on the top floors since c. 1936.

== Description ==
The Trust Building located at 155 King Street, on the corner of Castlereagh Street, Sydney. The Building is a twelve-story concrete and steel framed building with three additional basement levels. The building has stone exterior walls and a steel mansard roof (originally slate). The base courses were originally rock faced trachyte and the upper floors were dressed Pyrmont sandstone. The interior was a combination finish of marble, tiles and plasterwork.

The Art Deco banking chamber, two foyers, corridors and lift lobbies are substantially intact.

== State Heritage listing ==
The Trust Building is of State significance as one of the major buildings erected in Sydney in the pre-World War I period. It is an unsurpassed example of architecture in the Interwar Commercial Palazzo style. The exterior of the building is the leading example of the first generation skyscrapers in Sydney. It is also a rare commercial purpose-built building surviving in Sydney from the Edwardian Period.

The Trust Building is the site of the former Daily Telegraph offices, the highest circulating daily newspaper of the time. This building is one of four surviving newspaper offices built between 1900 and 1930.

Trust Building was listed on the New South Wales State Heritage Register on 2 April 1999 having satisfied the following criteria:

- The Trust Building is of State significance as the former offices of The Daily Telegraph, Sydney's highest circulating daily newspaper at the time of its construction. It is one of four surviving former newspaper offices from the period 1900–1930. The Trust Building is of significance as the Sydney office of Sir Rupert Clarke, a leading Victorian pastoralist and entrepreneur.
- The Trust Building is of State significance as a leading example of the first generation of Sydney skyscrapers.
- The Trust Building is of State significance as a rare surviving commercial building of the Edwardian period.

== See also ==
- Australian non-residential architectural styles
