= The Women's College building, Newtown =

The Women's College building
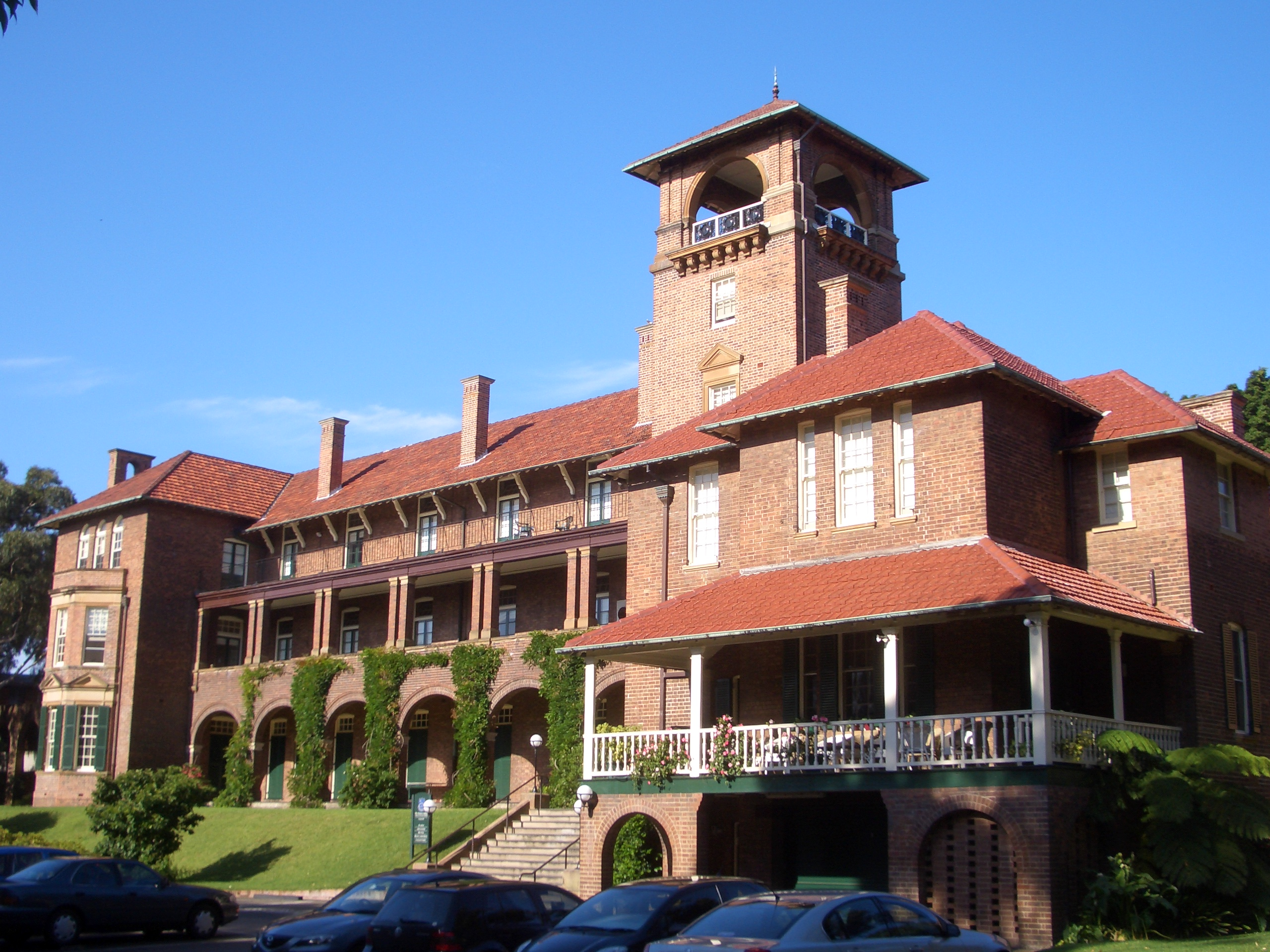
- The Women's College building, 2007

- Location within New South Wales Location within Australia
- 33.8907°S 151.1866°E
- Location: 15 Carillon Avenue, Newtown, City of Sydney, New South Wales, Australia

History
- Built: 1892–1924

Site notes
- Architect(s): Sulman & Power
- Owner: The Women's College

New South Wales Heritage Register
- Official name: Women's College, University of Sydney; The Women's College within the University of Sydney; Womens College
- Type: state heritage (built)
- Designated: 1 April 2005
- Reference no.: 1726
- Type: University
- Category: Education
- Builders: Bignell and Clark

The Women's College building is the heritage-listed building of The Women's College. a residential college for women students at the University of Sydney, located at 15 Carillon Avenue, Newtown, City of Sydney, New South Wales, Australia. It was designed by architects Sulman & Power and built from 1892 to 1924, with Bignell and Clark responsible for the initial construction. It was added to the New South Wales State Heritage Register on 1 April 2005.

== History ==
=== Aboriginal associations with the site now known as the University of Sydney ===
Material in rock shelters reveals that Aboriginal people inhabited the Sydney region at least from 20,000 years ago. About 3,000 years ago there appears to have been a major population increase of Aboriginal people in the area (and elsewhere throughout Australia), suggested by the evidence of many camp sites that seem to have come into use from that time. The traditional owners of the Sydney city region are the Cadigal people.

The foundation of the British penal colony at Sydney Cove in 1788 allied with the effects of a smallpox epidemic in 1789–1791 caused a massive disintegration of Aboriginal social structure around Sydney within the first decade of colonisation. Although there are accounts of some of the interactions between the early British arrivals and the indigenous people by writers such as Collins, Tench and Dawes, Aboriginal concepts of the cultural meanings of the Sydney landscape and its features were not recorded in detail. Other information about Aboriginal culture in Sydney before colonisation is embedded in physical traces left from their activities in the daily round of getting, preparing and eating food. No such traces have yet been recorded by the National Parks and Wildlife Service within the grounds of the University of Sydney, which is sited just four kilometres from Sydney Cove. The cleared land policy for the edge of the stockade meant that much evidence of Aboriginal occupation in this part of Sydney is long buried.

Further information is held within the oral history traditions of surviving Aboriginal families from the area. Dennis Foley from the University of Sydney's Koori Centre points out that the University of Sydney is situated between two Aboriginal tracks which were paved over to become Parramatta Road and City Road. According to family stories he has been told, the land in the corner where these tracks met, now known as Victoria Park, was an important "sit down" site for indigenous people because of the fresh water provided by its natural springs. That land, now adjacent to the main campus of the university, continued in this function as a meeting place for some years even after the British occupation until Aboriginal people were forcibly removed around 1820. There are several archaeological studies planned for different heritage sites within the university and these are likely to uncover further evidence of the Aboriginal occupation of the land. For example, Foley considered that there might be some indigenous women's sites in the vicinity of the Women's College.

=== The University of Sydney and its affiliated colleges ===
The University of Sydney was the first university in the Australian colonies. The preamble to its 1850 Act of Incorporation enunciated the social and non-sectarian context in which its educational objects were to be promoted: 'to hold forth to all classes and denominations of Her Majesty's subjects resident in New South Wales, without any distinction whatsoever, an encouragement for pursuing a regular and liberal course of education'.

The University of Sydney had features of both the University of London and the Queen's Colleges in Ireland, combining secular teaching by the university with provision for independent denominational colleges. It was a system never tried anywhere before. An 1854 Act to provide for the establishment and endowment of colleges within the University of Sydney specified the colleges' role: to provide "systematic religious instruction, and domestic supervision, with efficient assistance in preparing for the University lectures and examinations". In 1855 the university was granted 126 acres at Grose Farm, as a site for its own buildings and to enable it to make sub-grants for affiliated colleges of the four major denominations (Church of England, Roman Catholic, Presbyterian and Wesleyan).

In 1881 the University of Sydney Senate resolved to open the university to women "on an equal basis with men", following the lead of the University of Adelaide in 1877. Melbourne did likewise in the same year and quickly provided residential accommodation for women when Dr Alexander Leeper, the Warden of Trinity College, persuaded his Council to establish the 'Trinity Women's Hostel', the first university hostel for women in Australia, which opened in 1886. A permanent building was opened in 1891 but it was not until 1961 that Janet Clarke Hall (as it was renamed in 1921) became an independent affiliated college of the University of Melbourne.

=== A college for women ===
When moves began in Sydney to provide accommodation for women students it was on a different basis from the University of Melbourne model. A collegiate residence for women was proposed by a group of University and professional men and in May 1887 a public meeting resolved that a "College for Women" should be established under the terms of the 1854 Colleges Endowment Act but that it would be not be attached to any religious denomination. No change to the 1854 Colleges Endowment Act was necessary to accommodate such a college but because of the Act's requirement for "systematic religious instruction", the new college was subject to the provision that "no religious catechism or formulary distinctive of any particular denomination" should be taught. The college was to be non-denominational, but not without religion.

The proposal was practical (it was unlikely that there would be enough women students to support separate denominational colleges), was in accord with current educational philosophy, exemplified in Parkes' 1880 Education Act and was financially astute. As an affiliated college of the university, the College for Women would be eligible for a government building subsidy (matching public subscriptions) and for an annual endowment for the principal's salary. In 1889 the "College for Women" was established and endowed by the New South Wales legislature and being named in its Act as 'The Women's College' had to use this name thereafter. By 1891 sufficient funds had been raised to meet the conditions of the Endowment Act and the first College Council was elected. Louisa Macdonald, a Scot and classical scholar, was appointed principal at the end of 1891 and arrived in Sydney in March 1892 when the college opened in temporary premises in Glebe. Australia's first university was now home to the first University college for women in Australia. It had just four students.

=== The site and building designs ===
In July 1891 the College Council requested a site for the college within the university grounds and eventually accepted a treeless paddock with a frontage to Bligh Street (later Carillon Avenue) next to St Paul's College. Like the other colleges, the Women's College would be located at the furthest remove from the university and without any direct means of access to it.

In October 1891 a sub-committee of the council invited plans for the new building in a limited architectural competition and four months later recommended designs by the firm of Sulman and Power. Opposition from fellow Councillors and public criticism from members of the architectural profession for conflict of interest in its selection procedures caused any decisions to be held over until the arrival of the new principal, when, working with a new committee, Sulman and Power were formally appointed the college's architects. Work began in December 1892 and the new building was officially opened in May 1894.

=== The new building ===
The building committee broke away from the sandstone Gothic Revival architecture of the university, choosing instead the "Federation Free Classical" style, appropriate to the climate and to the college's finances. Essentially domestic in style and arrangement, the building was more akin to a large family residence than an educational institution. Even the principal's quarters were comparatively modest for her rank (thanks to the College Endowment Act) as the highest paid woman in New South Wales. As originally built, the college housed twenty-six students, the principal and five domestic staff. The design owed much to that of the Thomas Walker Convalescent Hospital at Concord, recently completed by Sulman and Power, and an obvious and much commented on connection between the firm, the Women's College Treasurer James Walker and one of its major donors, Eadith Walker.

=== The grounds ===
Work began on the grounds began in 1893. The main element of the landscaping was contributed by the architects whose design accommodated the sloping site by creating four levels linked by steep banks: an upper level to the east of the main building; the platform for the main building; the entrance drive; and the lower garden. These terraces and banks created a dominant but entirely artificial setting for the college in an otherwise featureless landscape, facing west towards St Andrew's College and ignoring the street frontage.

The first trees, a long row bordering the lawn on the western boundary, were "ceremonially planted by a number of men and women whose names were more or less closely connected with the history of the University and the College" in the winter of 1893. Plants, shrubs, bulbs and flower cuttings were provided by well wishers, including James Walker and his wife from their home, Rosemont in Woollahra while trees and shrubs were supplied from the Thomas Walker Convalescent Hospital.

=== Slow progress and plans for the future ===
When the new building opened in 1894 the college had six students and it was not until about 1906 that it was fully occupied. The earliest students came mainly from Sydney and its suburbs and from Queensland and it was not until about 1911 that the college began to accommodate a significant number of country students. From the beginning, its academic stance was serious and scholarly but not without other diversions. In its earliest years, College students comprised 10-20% of all women in the university and made a substantial contribution to University sports teams and other student organisations.

In 1909 the council was considering the future and the college was granted an additional piece of land to the north of its existing grounds. By 1914 there was enough in the Extension Fund to request the remainder of the government endowment and a small "garden pavilion" ('Cottage') was built in 1916. In 1918 a house on Bligh Street (The Maples) was rented and was purchased the following year.

When Louisa Macdonald retired in 1919, after twenty-seven years as the college's founding principal, the council resolved to erect an additional building 'in recognition of Miss Macdonald's services to the college and to the cause of women's education in Australia'. The proposal prompted consideration of what form any additions to the college should take. After a period of acute indecision the council finally decided to forgo a master plan for future development based on the original design but instead to build more student rooms on the east side of the existing building and then to build a new dining hall as the Louisa Macdonald Commemoration. Joseph Porter Power, now in partnership with John Adam, continued as the college architect.

Fifteen student rooms were completed in 1923 while additions to the servants' wing provided three more and quarters for the Bursar. The scale and design of the new dining hall, completed in the following year, announced the transition from "house" to college; from the domestic scale of the 1890s to the institution of the 1920s.

With the completion of the Louisa Macdonald Commemoration Hall, the original dining room became a student common room and the common room at the other end of the building became an addition to the library. With the remaining funds from the government endowment, the back wing of The Maples was pulled down in 1928 and a three-storey wing added, providing accommodation for seventeen undergraduates, two graduates, a tutor, the gardener and a maid.

=== 1920s–1930s ===
Under Miss Macdonald the college community functioned as a late Victorian or Edwardian household with the principal as its head. Its daily routine, begun with prayers, centred on the communality of meals. Changes instituted in 1919 by the new principal, Susie Williams, transformed the college into a different institution, with additional administrative and academic staff and a more business like Council.

The Maples was leased then purchased in 1918. Major alterations and additions occurred in 1928 with surplus funds from the government endowment funding the partial demolition of the back wing of The Maples and the addition of a three-storey wing providing accommodation for seventeen undergraduates, two graduates, a tutor, the gardener, Miss Warren, and a maid. In the summer vacation The Maples was used by staff and students who chose to remain in residence while the main college building closed for the holidays.

In the inter-war period the college grounds matured, creating "an oasis in the drabness of an industrial suburb". The strength of the original landscaping was still visible, but softened by mature trees and shrubs. Memorials to former students, Mary Dunnicliff and Marjorie Gladwin, beautified the garden: a sandstone seat on the lowest terrace; and a sundial in the back quadrangle. Flags of stone or cement gradually replaced asphalt paths. In 1932 the area between the principal's flat and the common room was transformed into a small brick paved courtyard.

Miss Williams continued the tradition of inviting friends of the college to plant trees. Along the boundaries, fences were replaced and on the Carillon Avenue frontage an impressive brick wall was built. In 1936 the timber gates were replaced with wrought iron.

By the early 1930s the college had over 70 students. The Great Depression caused a temporary decline in numbers but in 1936 the college was overfull and the council decided to build.

=== The Williams wing 1936–1937 ===
The architect for the new wing was R. G. Simpson and the design was part of a larger scheme for future development, although there is no evidence that this was ever endorsed by the council. A quadrangle, formed by the new wing, the dining hall and a cloister, following the line of the original terracing, was the focal point of the new accommodation which provided fifteen students' rooms, a visitor's room, large bathrooms and pantries. All of the student rooms faced inwards, leaving the corridor and services on the Carillon Avenue side where a 20-foot belt of trees gave protection from traffic noise and privacy from "the undesirable class of building opposite". With the construction of the connecting cloister, the ground to the west was excavated and that to the east was filled in, accentuating the difference in level between the two parts of the garden.

The scale and materials of the new two-storey wing were in sympathy with the college's existing architecture with features such as the artificial stone dressing on the projecting bay providing visual links between the old and the new. In similar fashion the arches of the cloister were modelled on the verandah of the original building.

Work began in November 1936 and the building, named the Susie Jane Williams Commemoration Wing in honour of the second principal of the college (1919 to 1935) was officially opened on 6 July 1937.

=== The expanding university 1920s–1930s ===
In the 1920s and 1930s the university began to encroach on the colleges. Originally centred on the Main Quadrangle and then, from the 1880s, extending along Science Road, in the early 20th century major new science facilities were built at some distance from the main University buildings. Physics (completed in 1925) and the School of Public Health and Tropical Medicine (opened in 1930) were both built on the south side of the hockey oval while the New Medical School (andopened in 1930) was sited close to the Royal Prince Alfred Hospital.

In 1928 the rough road built by St Andrew's College from Bligh Street to their principal's lodge was extended to the corner of the new Physics building to make the first part of Western Avenue, finally giving the Women's College a "street frontage", albeit within the university grounds.

=== Wartime and its aftermath ===
Restrictions, rationing, labour shortages and lack of materials made adequate maintenance of the college buildings almost impossible for the duration of World War II and even when the war ended there was little improvement. Only the most urgent repairs could be contemplated, if the necessary labour and materials could be found and basic maintenance took years to achieve, due to a shortage of good quality materials.

=== Changing lifestyles ===
Until the late 1940s the type of accommodation and pattern of communal living embodied in the design of the original college continued to be adaptable to contemporary needs. The college was supported by resident domestic staff and the other academic and administrative staff, of whom there were few, were single women and lived in ordinary College rooms. All meals were taken communally. By the late 1940s this style of domestic life was changing and so, with an increase in the size of the college, was the administration.

An extension to the college was planned in the late 1940s, despite post-war restrictions, but fund raising was a slow process. Pressure on student accommodation continued. In 1954 the college had 89 students in residence and 14 in hostels in Carillon Avenue owned by Moore College.

=== Reid wing 1958 ===
Additional accommodation became a reality in 1955 thanks to a substantial private donation. The council decided that the optimum size of the college would be about 150 "for the present", so that the whole student body could still be accommodated in the existing dining hall. Reid Wing, named in honour of its donor, was Ellice Nosworthy's first large commission for the college and provided rooms for 31 students, a small flat for the assistant principal and a common room and music rooms. It was the largest single increase in the size of the college in its history, enlarging the college community to 129 students, graduates and tutors. The Reid Wing was partially demolished and the rest refurbished in the mid 1990s.

=== The Murray Report 1957 & AUC funding; 1958–1970 ===
In 1957 the Commonwealth Government's Committee of Inquiry into the Future of Australian Universities, chaired by Sir Keith Murray proved the impetus and the means for a massive building programme within the University of Sydney and all its affiliated colleges.

The College Council's initial response to AUC funding was another piecemeal solution. Additions were made to the Williams wing and to the staff quarters behind the kitchen and when these were completed in 1960 the college reached its target size of 150 students and tutors.

In preparing submissions for funding in the 1964–1966 and 1967–1969 triennia the council opted for radical change and decided to double the size of the college with a new residential wing for 120-130 students and an extension to the dining hall by J. L. S. Mansfield of Fowell, Mansfield & Maclurcan.

Work began on the dining hall additions in January 1965, a flat-roofed extension, with low ceiling, on the south side of the existing hall. Some of the original windows and frames were reused in the new south wall.

=== Changes to the main building 1965 ===
An important concomitant of the projected growth of the college was the impact that this would have on the administration, including the need to provide adequate out-of-hours coverage by residential staff. The use of the college during vacations also had a significant impact upon staff, managerial and maintenance requirements. The college had been used for educational conferences and meetings, and specifically for women's groups, from Miss Williams' time, albeit on a fairly small scale. By the time extensions to the college were planned in the 1960s the "conference trade" was an important adjunct to college finances. New facilities needed to serve a double purpose for students in term time and conferences and visitors in vacations. In 1965 the whole of the ground floor of the main building was converted from residential to administrative office use.

=== The Langley wing and the New Common Room 1964–1969 ===
A major feature of the plan for the new accommodation was that it could be built in two stages, funded over two triennia of AUC grants. The location for the new four-storey building, designed in a Y-shape with a central stair, was the paddock. In addition to student rooms, there would also be small flats for tutors and provision for married couples. Stage 1 of the new residential wing, the central stair and south-east arm of the Y-shaped building, was occupied in Lent Term 1966 and to provide secure access between the new building and the old, a covered way was provided at first floor level, modelled on the arches of the original building, as R. G. Simpson had done in the 1930s.

Work on Stage 2 of the new wing began in 1967 and was completed by 1969, bringing the number of student places in college to 251. The Women's College was now the largest residential college within the University of Sydney.

The final part of the expansion scheme was a new common room, built on the site of the Cottage, which was demolished in December 1967. The design provided for a large, multi-purpose hall that could be used for theatrical performances, conferences, dances and other social functions. The Menzies Common Room was opened by Sir Robert Menzies on 5 July 1969 when the new wing was also officially opened and named in honour of Miss Langley.

Following the completion of building works, the Menzies courtyard was landscaped and native trees and shrubs were planted around the Langley wing, with hibiscus on the west side of the north wing and a rose garden on the east.

=== Social change in the 1960s–1970s ===
The 1960s and 1970s saw considerable changes in social and sexual mores that were inevitably played out in college and university life. In 1973 all students were provided with keys to the front door security system. All students were now free to come and go, as and when they chose, and to bring visitors into college at any time. Such freedom came at a price and security, noise, the nature of community life, the limits of personal freedom and the costs of maintaining it were frequent topics of discussion.

The conversion of the Maples into postgraduate accommodation in the 1970s was another significant step. Alterations and additions by architects Joseland and Gilling converted the building's living quarters into self-contained two-room units for married couples, or to twin share by students. The refurbishment program was completed in May 1971.

In 1977 the Women's College went even further along the path of social change when it amended its Act to allow the admission of men to the college and the possible appointment of a male principal. The college remained a college for women undergraduates, but admitted male graduates in the role of tutors or senior residents.

=== Fire safety and the computer revolution 1980s–1990s ===
In the early 1980s work began on the long and expensive process of improving fire safety throughout the college, the need for which was emphasised early in 1989 when an arsonist set fire to the area beneath the dining hall, one of a number of such attacks in Sydney at the time. In the 1990s new fire stairs, sprinkler systems, self-closing doors and emergency lighting were installed throughout the college and The Maples.

In the early 1990s the principal, Dr Ann Eyland, drew attention to the need to upgrade student computer facilities. The outcome was the concept of a Resource Centre, combining conventional library resources (still poorly housed in the Main building) with computer rooms and additional tutorial space. The design, by Gerry Rippon and Ken Reynolds, provided for a new building (on the site of the old Reid wing music rooms and bathrooms) with storage space in the basement, a reading room on the ground floor and new student rooms above. An addition to the south side of the remainder of Reid wing provided tutorial and meeting rooms with accommodation above, while the rest of the ground floor was remodelled as a part of the Resource Centre. The Vere Hole Resource Centre, named in honour of benefactor, college historian and former student Dr Vere Hole, was opened on 23 March 1996.

Through the generosity of Mrs Caroline Simpson and members of the Fairfax family, the garden at the back of the Main building was landscaped and the old library rooms were remodelled and renamed the Miss Mary Elizabeth Fairfax Rooms, to complement the new work.

=== The restoration of the Main building 1999–2001 ===
By the late 1990s, after a century of use, the original building was in need of substantial repair and restoration and in 1998–1999 a Conservation and Management Plan was prepared by Otto Cserhalmi & Partners. A grant from the Commonwealth Government Federation Cultural Heritage Projects Program enabled major works to proceed, supported by additional funds raised by the College Foundation.

This work included the: repair and conservation of brickwork and stonework; restoration of early rainwater goods and the conservation of the roof of the Main Common Room; restoration and repair of the front steps and landings in slate; removal of the bronze entry doors (installed in 1966) and making good the front entry porch; the replacement of floor and lights in the entrance hall and the installation of a new reception office; the replacement of floor and lights in the Main Common Room; and the refurbishment of study bedrooms. Otto Cserhalmi & Partners were the architects for the project, the completion of which was celebrated in May 2001.

=== Significant dates in the history of the Women's College ===
- 1850: Establishment of the University of Sydney, the first university in the Australia colonies
- 1854: Affiliated Colleges Endowment Act: provides for the establishment and endowment of independent, denominational colleges within the university. Colleges to provide for their students "systematic religious instruction, and domestic supervision, with efficient assistance in preparing for the University lectures and examinations".
- 1855: University granted 126 acres of land at Grose Farm for the university buildings and for sub-grants for affiliated colleges of the four major religious denominations (Church of England, Roman Catholic, Presbyterian and Wesleyan)
- 1877: University of Adelaide admits women students
- April 1881: Admission of women to the University of Sydney "on an equal footing with men" agreed to by the University Senate
- 1882: First two women pass the university matriculation examinations
- 1885: First women students graduate from the University of Sydney
- 1886: Trinity Women's Hostel opened in the University of Melbourne
- May 1887: Public Meeting held to discuss the establishment of a non-denominational college for women within the University of Sydney. Committees formed to raise funds and to attend to the legal aspects of establishing a college.
- 1889: Act to establish and endow a College for Women
- 1891: Sufficient funds raised for the subscribers to elect the first College Council
- 1891: Opening of permanent building for Trinity Women's Hostel, Melbourne [later named Janet Clarke Hall]
- July 1891: First meeting of the College Council
- October 1891: College Council appoints committee of three Councillors to invite sketch plans for new college from no more than eight architectural firms
- February 1892: Committee recommends acceptance of design by Sulman & Power. Decision deferred pending the arrival of the new principal, Louisa Macdonald from London
- March 1892: Arrival of Louisa Macdonald, the first principal. Sub-committee formed (Sir William Windeyer, the principal and Professor Scott) to confer with the Government Architect and Sulman & Power concerning further designs for the college.
- March 1892: The Women's College opens in temporary premises in "Strathmore", Glebe
- April 1892: Sulman & Power appointed architects to the college
- September 1892: Senate authorises the Women's College to take up the site formerly promised to the Teachers' College
- November 1892: Council agrees to accept the site
- December 1892: Work begins on site: Bignell & Clark builders
- Winter 1893: First trees planted bordering the lawn on the western boundary by men and women closely associated with the university and the foundation of the college. Asphalt tennis court formed at back of building.
- February 1894: Building work completed: college designed to accommodate twenty-six students
- March 1894: Principal and six students move into the new building [later known as the Main building]
- April 1894: College coat-of-arms designed
- 5 May 1894: Official opening of the Women's College by Lady Duff
- August 1896: Casts of the Parthenon frieze in place in the college dining hall
- 1906: College fully occupied for the first time
- November 1908: Senate agrees to grant additional land to the college
- 1909: One and a half acres added to the college site on the north side: known as the paddock
- 1914: College seeks additional endowment from the Government for extensions, to designs of Mr Power
- 1916: Balance of endowment funds secured
- April 1916: A "garden pavilion" to house six students built to the east of Main building, known as "The Cottage". Architects Power & Adam
- 1918: College leases The Maples, a house adjacent on Bligh Street [Carillon Avenue]
- 1919: College purchases The Maples
- April 1919: Council resolves to erect an additional building 'in recognition of Miss Macdonald's services to the college and to the cause of women's education in Australia'
- 1921: Original plan for the extension of the college abandoned. Extra accommodation to be provided by building rooms on the east side of the main corridor; a new Dining Hall to be the Louisa Macdonald Commemoration Hall
- 1921: Tower converted into student room(s)
- October 1922: Tenders called for new work
- 1922: Addition to original building: 15 rooms built on the east side of the Main corridor. Removal of most of eastern verandah of original building but small portions left in centre and at south end. New dining hall [the Louisa Macdonald Commemoration Hall], kitchen and maids' quarters built over site of original kitchens. Part of original servants' quarters remodelled. Original dining hall converted into common room and original common room to be used as extension to library. Architects Power & Adam. Builders L Shaw & Co.
- 11 April 1923: Foundation stone laid for the Louisa Macdonald Commemoration Hall
- 1923–1924: Installation of electricity in Main building
- October 1924: Official opening of the Louisa Macdonald Commemoration Hall with specially commissioned portrait of Miss Macdonald above High Table
- 1924: College now accommodates 60 students
- 1926: Small pantry built next to the Main Common Room [the original dining hall]
- 1928: Back wing of The Maples demolished and three-storey wing added to accommodate seventeen students, two graduates, a tutor, the gardener and a maid
- 1929: Construction of brick wall along Carillon Avenue boundary
- 1931: Maplewood dado added to small vestibule and up staircase leading to dining hall
- 1935: Maplewood dado panelling added to entrance hall
- 1936: Wrought iron gates replace timber gates on Carillon Avenue entrance
- 1936–1937: Construction of new wing, to south of Louisa Macdonald Commemoration Hall with accommodation for fourteen students and cloister (walkway) connecting it to the Main building. Architect R G Simpson
- 6 July 1937: Official opening of the Susie Jane Williams Commemoration Wing
- 1943: College overcrowded; some students living three to a room
- 1947: Roof damaged by violent hail storm
- 1947: Sketch plans prepared for appeal for funds for additions to college
- 1950: Loggia in tower converted into rooms. Kitchenette installed in principal's flat. Ground floor room in Main converted into Senior Common Room and another room as common room for resident staff
- 1951: Additional small staircase added to north end of Main building with new bathrooms on mezzanine levels. Small lecture room & adjacent student rooms on ground floor incorporated into the library [the original common room]. Architect Ellice Nosworthy
- June 1952: The Mary Fairfax Library opened
- 1954: Eighty-nine students in residence and 14 in hostels in Carillon Avenue owned by Moore College
- 1955: Mary Reid offers donation over four years that enables new building to be planned. Council decides that size of the college will be limited to 150 "at the present" following discussions at Heads of Colleges Conference in Melbourne where the economic size of colleges was discussed.
- 1956: Former balcony areas in centre of east side of Main building (first and second floors) converted into student rooms, known as the Fitzhardinge rooms. Architect Ellice Nosworthy
- 1956–1958: Construction of new Reid Wing to east of Main building with rooms for 31 students, a small flat for the vice principal, common room and music rooms. Architect Ellice Nosworthy (who lived at Women's College while studying architecture at Sydney University in the 1920s).
- 1957: Murray Report on the future of Australian universities
- 12 April 1958: Reid Wing opened
- 1958: Senior Common Room enlarged by combining two rooms on ground floor of Main building [formerly students' rooms]
- 1958: Student's room in former loggia of tower incorporated into the principal's flat as private sitting room
- 1959: New entrance made to college from Western Avenue
- 1959–1960: Additions to north and south ends of kitchen wing staff quarters [Back Alley]. Additions to east and west ends of Williams wing for additional student accommodation. Architect Ellice Nosworthy
- 1960: College reaches target size of 150 students and tutors
- 1960–1961: Window in south wall of Main Common Room [original dining room] removed and opening lengthened to give a garden view, as a memorial to former principal, Camilla Wedgwood. Installation of Wedgwood plaque. Architects Ellice Nosworthy and Leslie Wilkinson
- 1962: Council resolves to double the size of the college
- April 1963: JLS Mansfield of Fowell, Mansfield and Maclurcan formally requested to submit sketch plans and estimates for new student accommodation and for extension to dining hall
- 1964: New accommodation to Y-shaped plan to be built in two stages in "the paddock", to the north of Main building
- 1965: Addition to Dining Hall & works in kitchen. Architects Fowell, Mansfield & Maclurcan
- 13 March 1965: Foundation stone laid for Stage 1 of new residential wing [Langley wing]. Architects Fowell, Mansfield & Maclurcan
- 1965: Alterations to rooms on ground floor of Main building [original students' rooms] for use by administration (offices for principal, vice principal, Secretary, Household Manager, Housekeeper). Architects Fowell, Mansfield, Jarvis & Maclurcan
- 1966: Stage 1 of new residential wing completed and fully occupied
- 1966: Installation of bronze framed glass doors to enclose front porch. Architect Ellice Nosworthy
- 1967–1969: Construction of Stage 2 of new residential wing [Langley]. Architects Fowell, Mansfield, Jarvis & Maclurcan
- 1967: Construction of covered walkway between Reid & new wing [Langley] and enclosure of existing "cloister" between Williams and Main building. Architects Fowell, Mansfield, Jarvis & Maclurcan
- 1967: Modifications to Main building for construction of Menzies Common Room and demolition of The Cottage. Architects Fowell, Mansfield, Jarvis & Maclurcan
- 1967–1969: Construction of New Common Room [Menzies Common Room]. Architects Fowell, Mansfield, Jarvis & Maclurcan
- 1967: Former visitors' room on ground floor of Main building converted into enquiry office at main entrance
- 1969: New residential wing [Langley] completed. College accommodates 251 students and is now the largest residential college within the University of Sydney
- 5 July 1969: Langley wing and the Menzies Common Room officially opened by Sir Robert Menzies
- 1970–1971: The Maples refurbished for postgraduate accommodation. Architects Joseland & Gilling
- 1972: Replacement of balcony on top floor of Main building. Architects Joseland & Gilling
- 1972: Floor of front verandah on ground floor of Main building lifted to replace broken pipes from roof drainage, to remedy damp. Front steps replaced. Renovation of fireplace and chimney in Main Common Room
- 1974: Alterations to principal's flat. Architects Joseland Gilling & Assocs
- 1976: Refurbishment of Main Common Room: heating system installed; new lighting with spotlights, dimmers & sidelights; plaster casts removed, room repainted including the timber ceiling
- 1977: Overhaul of accommodation behind kitchen [Back Alley], previously used for resident domestic staff, converted for student use
- 1977: The Women's College Act amended to include the admission of men to the college and the appointment of a male principal
- 1978: Installation of thermal and smoke detectors
- 1981: Installation of fire detection system in main body of college
- 1982: Installation of fire detection system in The Maples
- 1988: Installation of smoke doors, smoke seals, door closers etc. in Menzies, Main and Reid wing. Architects Clive Lucas, Stapleton & Partners
- 1989: Fire in box room and dry store underneath Dining Hall. Reinstatement of Dining Hall timber floor, some damage to panelling
- 1990–1991: Installation of new fire stair Main, Reid and Menzies, emergency lights etc. Architects Clive Lucas, Stapleton & Partners
- 1990–1991: Installation of sprinkler system
- 1990: Installation of new fire stair in Williams wing, emergency lights etc. Architects Clive Lucas, Stapleton & Partners
- 1991: Installation of emergency lighting etc. The Maples. Architects Clive Lucas, Stapleton & Partners
- 1991: Installation of emergency lighting etc. Langley wing. Architects Clive Lucas, Stapleton & Partners
- 1994–1996: Resource Centre built. Part of Reid wing demolished and new library, computer rooms and basement storage constructed. Remaining section of Reid wing remodelled with additions, as computer rooms, library and archives rooms and tutorial rooms on ground floor with student accommodation on upper floors. Architects Gerry Rippon & Ken Reynolds
- 23 March 1996: Vere Hole Resource Centre officially opened by the Chancellor Dame Leonie Kramer
- 1996: Remodelling of rooms in Main previously used for library; renamed the Miss Mary Elizabeth Fairfax Rooms. Architect Howard Tanner & Interior Designer Leslie Walford
- 1996: New landscaping in courtyard between back of Main building and Menzies Common Room. Designers David Wilkinson & Gay Stanton
- 1998: Installation of telephone and data access points in all student rooms
- 1998–1999: Conservation Management Plan for the Sulman & Power building [Main building] prepared by Otto Cserhalmi & Partners
- 1998: College applies for grant from the Commonwealth Government Federation Cultural Heritage Projects Program to conserve the Main building
- 1999: Grant received from Commonwealth government
- 1999–2000: Major restoration programme for Main building. Repair and conservation of brickwork and stonework; restoration of early rainwater goods and conservation of roof of Main Common Room; restoration and repair of front steps and landings in slate; removal of bronze entry doors and making good the front entry porch; replacement of floor and lights in entrance hall and installation of new reception office; replacement of floor and lights in Main Common Room; refurbishment of study bedrooms. Architect Otto Cserhalmi & Partners
- 2003: Installation of two wall-mounted display cases in Menzies Corridor. Replacement of old bulletin board leading to the Dining Hall with new. Handcrafting three mahogany pedestals replicating column mouldings in entrance hall. Zeny Edwards and Lewis and Lewis, Cabinetmakers.

== Description ==
=== Building complex ===
The Women's College comprises a collection of brick buildings set within landscaped gardens adjoining the grounds of other affiliated colleges of the University of Sydney.

Seven phases of institutional building, carried out between 1892 and 1996, are represented on the site, demonstrating the growth of the college and changing architectural styles over more than a century. The original building was designed to accommodate 26 students and the college now houses over 280 students.

Phase 1
Main Building 1892–1894: architects Sulman & Power

The original (Main) building was completed in 1894 to the design of John Sulman and his partner, Joseph Porter Power and consists of an entrance hall, staff offices, principal's accommodation, common rooms, meeting rooms, and student accommodation. It is a three-storey brick and stone building planned along an elongated north-south axis, terminating in a projecting wing with bay windows at the northern end and a four-storey Italianate tower at the southern end. Decorative sandstone elements on the sills, pediments, chimneys and column capitals are used as ornamental features. The red brickwork is laid in Flemish bond with tuck pointing. The principal's flat forms a small wing to the south west of the tower. The main building sits prominently and dramatically at the top of artificially constructed grassed terraces, affording views to the surrounding gardens.

The building was designed in the "Free Federation Classical Style", a free interpretation of the Italian Renaissance style adapting elements from the Queen Anne period. The stylistic details of this original building are predominantly neo-Italian Renaissance. Although the original building has had many additions and alterations over the years it is still possible to identify the early fabric and components of the original design.

The high quality of workmanship and building materials of the original building contribute to its aesthetic and technical significance. These materials include the dressed sandstone detailing, brick chimney details, French doors and timber shutters on the exterior. Interior elements include the timber panel joinery and plaster details of the original entrance hall, original timber doors, architraves and pediments, circular feature windows, and the details of the staircase including carved timber balusters newel posts and handrails, the four stained glassed windows within the stairwell.

The strong form of the grass embankments and terraces is an important component within this setting, as these were designed and constructed at the same time as the main building and complement the scale and simplicity of the architecture. The terracing is important in maintaining original views to and from the main western elevation. The wisteria on the main western elevation, the oak tree on the lower grass terrace and the continuous tree canopy along the western boundary are all individual landscape plants of considerable significance. The trees on the western boundary provide a sense of enclosure to the western terrace and main building.

Phase 2; Additional student accommodation and the Louisa Macdonald Commemoration Hall 1923–1924
architects Power & Adam

In 1923–1924 an addition to the original building designed by Power & Adam was built on the east side of the main corridor, formerly occupied by the eastern verandah to provide 15 student rooms. In order to accommodate the increased number of students and to create a memorial to the work of the first principal, the Louisa Macdonald Commemoration Hall, designed by Joseph Porter Power of Power & Adam was added to the southeast of the main building. Accessed via a second staircase leading off the original entrance hall the building consisted of a dining room, kitchen, utility rooms, offices and some student accommodation.

The most striking feature of the Dining Hall is the extensive use of timber, particularly in the elaborate roof consisting of substantial beams with truss detailing in curved and circular timber sections. Timber panelling on the walls directs the eye to the bull's eye clerestory windows featuring elaborate timber surrounds, along the north and south walls. There is also a timber "minstrels' gallery" at the west end of the dining room. The moulded timber skirting and the timber floor are original, with the exception of the narrower floor boards. Other original or early details include the large double-hung windows with original hardware located under the circular windows and the plaster-battened mansard ceiling with circular vents. The hall was enlarged in 1965–1969 and the southern wall removed and replaced by a series of columns. The original windows were used in the south wall of the later extension.

The Maples, a Victorian house on an adjoining lot, was leased before being purchased in 1918. Major alterations and additions occurred in 1928 with surplus funds from the government endowment funding the partial demolition of the back wing of the Maples and the addition of a three-storey wing providing accommodation for seventeen undergraduates, two graduates, a tutor, the gardener and a maid. In the summer vacation the Maples was used by staff and students who chose to remain in residence while the main college building closed for the holidays.

Phase 3
The Susie Jane Williams Wing: architect R. G. Simpson 1936–1937

A two-storey brick addition with tiled roof, linked by cloisters to the south side of the entrance to the Louisa Macdonald Commemoration Hall with 14 student rooms and associated facilities. The building incorporates many details that complement the original design, including the decorative sandstone details, face brick construction, double hung windows and terracotta tiled hip and gable roofs.

Phase 4
The Reid Wing: architect Ellice Nosworthy 1957–1958

A two-storey face brick addition with aluminium windows and sandstone sills and a hipped roof of terracotta tiles adjoining the north end of the Main building with 31 students rooms, a small flat for the vice principal, a common room and music rooms. [Part demolished and the remainder adapted in 1994–1996 as part of the Vere Hole Resource Centre]

Phase 5
Additions to Williams wing and to the staff accommodation at the back of the kitchen [Back Alley] 1959–1950: architect Ellice Nosworthy

Two-storey brick additions with tile roof to north and south ends of the kitchen wing staff quarters [Back Alley] and two and three-storey brick additions with tile roof to east and west ends of the Williams Wing for student and staff accommodation.

Phase 6
Langley wing & connecting walkway, the Menzies Common Room and an addition to the dining hall: architects Fowell, Jarvis, Mansfield and Maclurcan 1965–1969

The college doubled in size with the help of AUC funding in the 1960s. The main elements of this expansion were: a four-storey residential block of brick with metal roof, in Y-shaped configuration with central staircase providing student and staff accommodation (Langley wing) and connecting walkway to Main building; a large students' common room and all-purpose hall (Menzies Common Room) and; a single-storey flat roofed addition to the 1924 dining hall, reusing some elements of the original (windows and frames).

The Menzies Common Room is two storeys high internally and is linked to the north side of the Dining Hall and to the Main Building by means of a corridor which blocks off all natural light from the main staircase and obstructs the lower stained glass windows.

Phase 7
The Vere Hole Resource Centre; architects Gerry Rippon & Ken Reynolds

Part of Reid wing demolished (laundries and music rooms) and remainder refurbished. With additions to provide library and archive offices, storage and reading room, computer rooms, common rooms, teaching rooms and student accommodation.

=== Setting ===
The landscape setting of the Women's College is important in maintaining original views to and from the main western elevation of the original Sulman & Power building and its elevated position atop the tiered levels. The wisteria (Wisteria sinensis) vine on the main western elevation of the building, the oak (Quercus robur) tree on the lower grass terrace and the continuous tree canopy along the western boundary are all individual landscape plants (sic: elements) of considerable heritage significance.

=== Landscape and gardens ===
The Women's College was built on a treeless paddock immediately to the west of St Paul's College. Although the site had a frontage to Carillon Avenue the building with its main axis at right angles to the street, facing west towards St Andrew's College. The original entry road from Carillon Avenue was a gravel driveway terminating in a circular turning area outside the front steps. This has now been replaced by a bitumen roadway.

The grounds of the main building comprise three (of the original four) distinct levels with steep, grass embankments in between that were constructed in 1893 and which formed the most significant feature within the original landscaping. These embankments, combined with the layout and design of the building facilitated the passive cooling of the building by cross ventilation, a feature characteristic of the work of Sulman and Power.

From the 1890s, when many plants were donated by well wishers, the gardens developed through to the 1940s reflecting a gardenesque landscape more commonly seen in grand residential properties. The existing garden bed at the base of the upper embankment includes small flowering trees and shrubs: crab apples, cherry, azaleas and assorted annuals.

Under the influence of Professor Wilkinson in the 1920s and 1930s, flags of stone and cement gradually replaced asphalt paths but in later years discordant paving materials were used diminishing the unifying elements of the whole landscape.

When the college was first built, the scale and simplicity of the building and its dominant roofline were accentuated by the open nature of the surrounding landscape and absence of any soft vegetation close to the building. Today, the mature trees around the north, east and west boundaries enhance the sense of enclosure and privacy within the college grounds.

By the 1940s creeping fig (Ficus pumila var.pumila) nearly covered the front walls, bay window and tower. This created a dramatic leafy effect, particularly combined with the maturing flowering shrubs in the lower gardens. In 1947, the creeper was removed and a mauve-flowered wisteria (Wisteria sinensis) retained and this is now a significant feature of the college each spring.

The different architectural styles of the associated buildings within the Women's College contribute to the similarly disparate treatment of green spaces with the introduction of native plants, large areas of garden beds and the increased use of a variety of paving materials. The principal courtyards at the Women's College include: the Central Courtyard located behind the main building, which contains a sundial; the two courtyards adjacent to the Williams Wing comprising the Upper Level Courtyard which is enclosed to the west by a covered walkway and to the east by a densely planted garden bed including a mature jacaranda, and the Lower Level Courtyard which features a brick wall at the base of a covered walkway. The small brick paved courtyard located between the principal's flat and the Main Common Room was built in 1933 and designed by Miss Peggy MacIntyre.

Significant Trees

In 1894 trees were planted by friends and supporters of the college including: Lady Duff, Mr Walker, Miss Woolley, Mrs W. R. Campbell, Miss Deas Thomson, Mrs Badham, Sir William Manning, Miss Windeyer, Lady Darley, Mrs Gurney, Miss Eadith Walker, Miss Jane Russell, and Miss Fairfax. Lady Duff planted an oak, possibly the existing Holm Oak (Quercus ilex) which is located about the centre of the western boundary tree plantings.

Front Gates

The front gates on Carillon Avenue are wrought iron and were a gift to the college from Mr S. S. Cohen in 1936. The original gates were timber. The existing gates are supported by stone piers which contrast with the adjacent brick wall piers.

Memorial Seat

The sandstone seat on the lower grass terrace was designed by Leslie Wilkinson in the 1920s as a memorial to Miss Mary Dunnicliff, a student of the college from 1895 to 1897 and afterwards a teacher at Sydney Girls' High School and Fort Street Girls' High School. The Sydney yellow block stone seat rests on a stone foundation and bears the carved initials "M.C.D." and the dates "1895–1897". The stone was supplied from the Harbour Bridge excavations by J. J. C. Bradfield who was a member of Council. The hedge surrounding the seat comprises a number of species including privet (Ligustrum ovalifolium) which may have been planted later and which has been clipped into a high hedge and now provides an intimate but restricted space around the seat.

Sundial

Located in the central courtyard is the sundial, the plinth for which was designed by Professor Leslie Wilkinson and installed in memory of Miss Marjorie Gladwin who was a student in college from 1925 until her death from diabetes in May 1927. Donated by her mother and brother, the sundial was erected in the quadrangle on 5 November 1928. The bronze dial bears the date 1720, the maker's name "T. Mills LONDON", and the inscription Use well the present moments as they fly. The sandstone plinth bears the inscription "Love alters not with his brief hours and week".

== Heritage listing ==
The Women's College within the University of Sydney, opened in 1892, was the first university college for women in Australia. The earliest section of the college, designed by the architectural firm of Sulman & Power and completed in 1894, is a fine example of an institutional building in the "Federation Free Classical" style of architecture. This original wing of the college exhibits a high quality of workmanship and retains the intended relationship with its terraced landscape.

The integrity of this part of the college, which retains many original or early fittings and items of furniture, contributes substantially to its rarity value. Substantial additions to the original college throughout the twentieth century demonstrate the growth of the institution, changing architectural styles, social mores and teaching requirements. The college contains many items of moveable heritage - furniture, commemorative objects and works of art that contribute to the aesthetic significance of the place. The college is the only non-denominational affiliated college established under the 1854 University of Sydney Affiliated Colleges Act and has occupied its present site since 1894.

The Women's College is of State significance for being in continuous use as a university college for women for over one hundred years and for its academic and collegiate achievements, including in sports and the arts. The Women's College is significant for its role in promoting women's participation in higher education and public life. It is also significant to the broader university community's sense of place.

Women's College building was listed on the New South Wales State Heritage Register on 1 April 2005 having satisfied the following criteria.

The place is important in demonstrating the course, or pattern, of cultural or natural history in New South Wales.

The Women's College is of State significance as the first university college for women in NSW, Australia and indeed within the British Commonwealth. It is also of State significance for being in continuous use as a university college for women for over one hundred years and for its high standard of academic excellence and achievement in collegiate activities including sports and the arts. The Women's College is significant for its role in raising the status of women through higher education and by actively promoting a broader role for women in the management of the college and in public life. The college archives provide a significant resource for the history of the place, its students, staff and Councillors.

The place has a strong or special association with a person, or group of persons, of importance of cultural or natural history of New South Wales's history.

The Women's College is of State significance for its close association with many of the early women students of the University of Sydney and its continuing association with subsequent generations of women students of the university, many of whom were pioneers or outstanding practitioners in their chosen disciplines.

The college also has a significant association with the architectural firm of Sulman & Power and its successors, Power & Adam and Power, Adam & Munnings and with other architects who have made a substantial contribution to its built form including R G Simpson; Ellice Nosworthy; Leslie Wilkinson; and Fowell, Mansfield & Maclurcan.

The college contains a number of memorials commemorating its historical associations with former principals, alumnae, Councillors, benefactors and friends of the college. These include buildings (the Louisa Macdonald Commemoration Hall; Williams Wing; Langley Wing; Reid Wing & the Vere Hole Resource Centre); architectural features (the Wedgwood Memorial in the Main Common Room); plaques; named rooms; furniture, pictures and other moveable heritage items.

The Women's College is also of State significance for being closely associated with the life and work of many women and men who were prominent in the history of the college and in university and public life including its earliest principals: Louisa Macdonald; Susie Williams, Camilla Wedgwood and Betty Archdale; Councillors: Senator James Walker, Dame Eadith Walker, the Rt Hon Sir George Rich, Jessie Street, the Hon Sir Philip Street, Katherine Ogilvie, Julie Fitzhardinge, Dr Margaret Mulvey, Jane Foss Russell (Mrs Barff), Mary Fairfax, Emmeline Woolley, Margaret Windeyer, Professor Marie Bashir; and Benefactors: Professor Walter Scott, Mrs Mary Read, and the Fairfax family.

The place is important in demonstrating aesthetic characteristics and/or a high degree of creative or technical achievement in New South Wales.

The earliest section of the college, designed by the architectural firm of Sulman & Power, is of State significance a fine example of an institutional building in the Federation Free Classical style of architecture. It exhibits a high quality of workmanship and retains many of its original features. Despite considerable additions to the site, the original building is still clearly evident, and maintains its original relationship with its terraced setting and garden. Subsequent additions to the original college buildings include representative examples of collegiate architecture of the 1930s, 1950s, 1960s and 1990s, demonstrating changes in architectural fashion, building, engineering and technological requirements throughout the college's history.

The college contains many items of furniture, commemorative objects and works of art that contribute to the aesthetic significance of the place. Many of these were donated by individuals and families who have had a long association with the history of the college since its establishment.

The architectural style originally chosen for the Women's College broke away from the traditional sandstone Gothic Revival style typical of early University of Sydney buildings, to establish an alternative architecture appropriate to the needs of women students.

The place has a strong or special association with a particular community or cultural group in New South Wales for social, cultural or spiritual reasons.

Socially the Women's College is of State significance for its long-term function as a residence for women students of the University of Sydney and more recently as a site for academic conferences and seminars. The buildings and landscape of the Women's College suggest the influence of the "Oxbridge" ideal of university architecture. The Women's College is held in high esteem by its alumnae for whom the original building remains the most identifiable and iconic element of the place. It is also significant to the broader university community's sense of place.

The place has potential to yield information that will contribute to an understanding of the cultural or natural history of New South Wales.

The Sulman and Power building within the Women's College is of State significance for providing evidence of the innovative constructional techniques developed by John Sulman and his attempts at developing an Australian style of architecture. The original building of the Women's College is also significant for providing evidence of the way of life of early women students of the University of Sydney and in particular of their domestic and social arrangements and has the potential to demonstrate this to future generations. The building is complemented by items of moveable heritage that enhance this understanding and by archival holdings that provide documentary and pictorial evidence of this way of life. Subsequent additions to the college have the potential to demonstrate fashions in institutional architecture and changes in the social and domestic life of students throughout its history. Further research, including oral history and landscape analysis may yield additional information about the buildings and grounds of the college and their use over time.

The place possesses uncommon, rare or endangered aspects of the cultural or natural history of New South Wales.

The Women's College is of State significance as the first university college for women in Australia and in the British Commonwealth. It remains the only non-denominational college within the University of Sydney. The Women's College is a rare example of an educational institution designed specifically for the accommodation of women university students in the late 19th century. The integrity of the original building contributes substantially to its rarity value.

The place is important in demonstrating the principal characteristics of a class of cultural or natural places/environments in New South Wales.

The Women's College is of State significance as the best and most intact example of the educational and institutional works of Sulman and Power in Australia. Other examples of their work include The Armidale School (opened 1 February 1894) and the New England Ladies College (1888). The architectural style and features of the Women's College, specifically defined by the Italianate tower, bear striking similarities with the Thomas Walker Convalescent Hospital (1893) and Upton Grey (1894). The expansion of the Women's College in the later 1950s and 1960s is representative of the impact of the Murray Report on Australian universities and residential colleges at this period and of the significance of AUC funding to their development.
