= Mungo MacCallum =

Mungo MacCallum is the name of four prominent Australians (four consecutive generations of the same family). They are:

- Mungo William MacCallum (1854–1942), Professor of Modern Literature, Vice Chancellor and Chancellor of the University of Sydney, father of
- Mungo Lorenz MacCallum (1884–1934), son of Mungo William MacCallum, Rhodes Scholar, lectured in Roman Law at University of Sydney; writer & book reviewer
- Mungo Ballardie MacCallum (1913–1999), son of Mungo Lorenz MacCallum, journalist with the Sydney Morning Herald and also ABC, producing its opening night of television in 1956
- Mungo Wentworth MacCallum (1941–2020), son of Mungo Ballardie MacCallum and Diana Wentworth; political journalist and author
