= Switch On Bigga =

1954 documentary by Lee Robinson

Switch on Bigga is a 1954 Australian documentary. It was directed by Lee Robinson, produced by Stanley Hawes and written by Mungo MacCallum.

It concerns electricity coming to the New South Wales town of Bigga. During filming it was known as Billy Sees the Light.

The movie screened in some cinemas.
