= The Women's College, University of Sydney =

Residential college, The University of Sydney

The Women's College
- University of Sydney
- Location: 15 Carillon Ave, Newtown NSW, 2042
- Coordinates: 33°53′27″S 151°11′11″E
- Full name: The Women's College
- Motto in English: Together
- Established: 1894
- Sister college: The Women's College, University of Queensland
- Principal: Dr Tiffany Donnelly
- Residents: 285
- Affiliate Students (Non-Residents): 50
- Website: The Women’s College within The University of Sydney

The Women's College is a residential college within the University of Sydney, in the suburb of Camperdown, Sydney, New South Wales, Australia. It was opened in 1892.

The Women's College is one of two all-female residential colleges at The University of Sydney. It accommodates approximately 280 students accepting both under- and post-graduate students. It also has approximately 30 non-resident students (affiliates). The principal, vice-principal and dean of students live on the premises.

The college's buildings were added to the New South Wales State Heritage Register on 1 April 2005.

== History ==
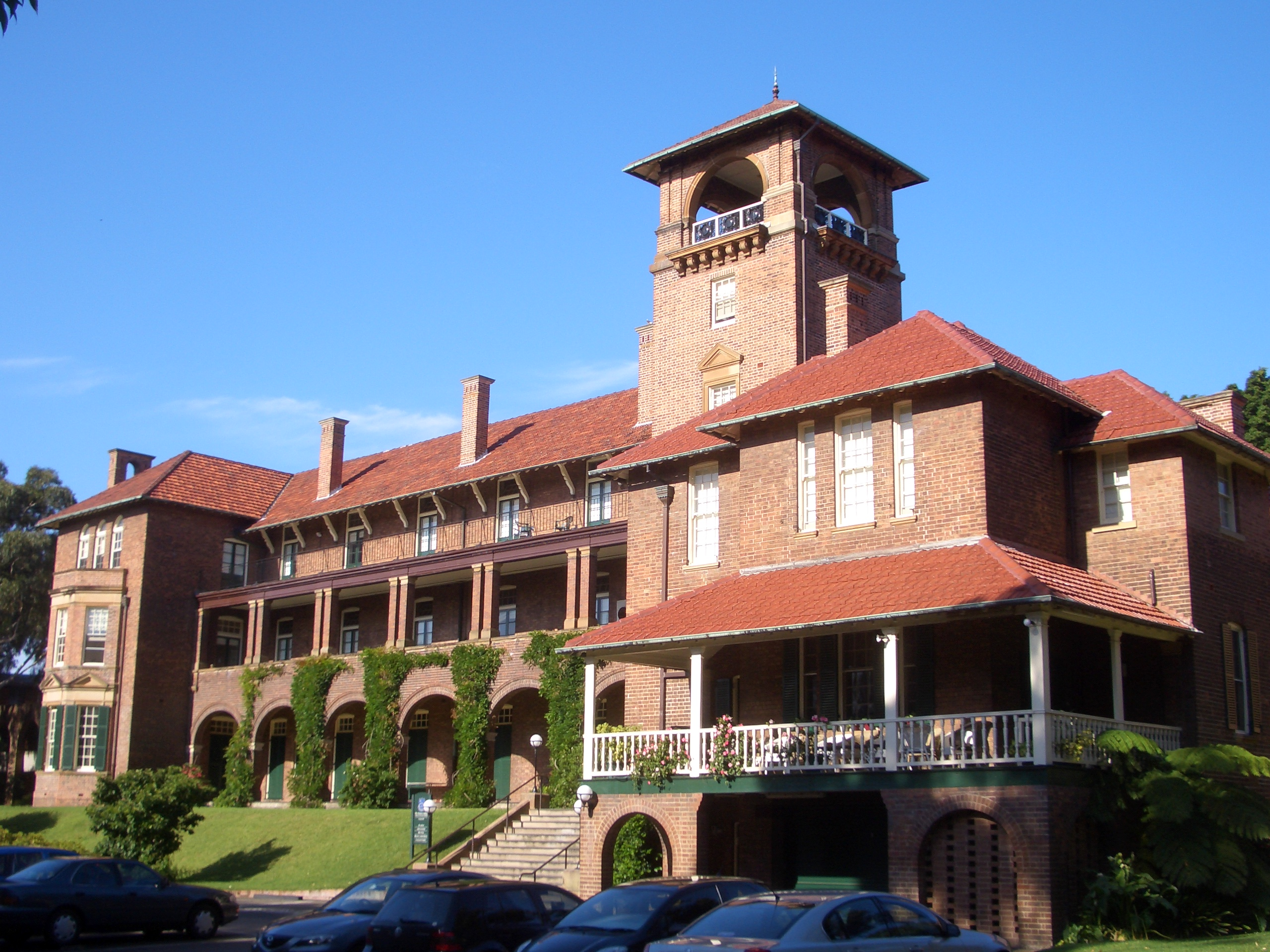
The Women's College at the University of Sydney

In 1889 a college for women within the University of Sydney was established and endowed by an Act of the NSW Parliament. This was the culmination of a process that began in 1887 when, six years after the formal admission of women to the University of Sydney "in complete equality with men", a public meeting was held to discuss the desirability of establishing a residential college for women. Over the course of the next five years, funds were raised enabling the college to open in March 1892 in temporary accommodation in "Strathmore", a rented house in Glebe. It had four resident and four non-resident (or affiliate) students.

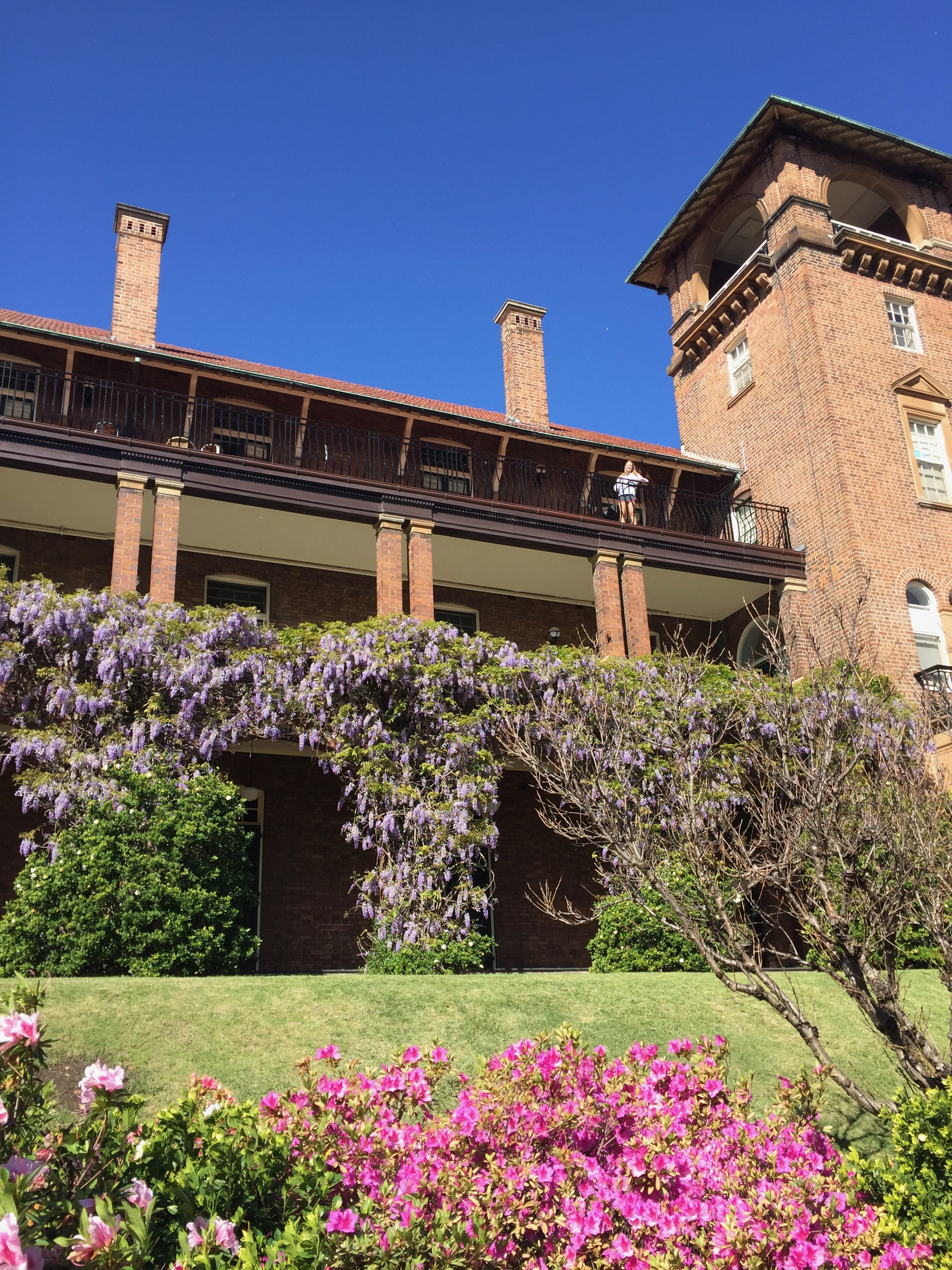
The Women's College Main Building

Granted land by the university on the southern edge of campus, the college moved to its own building in May 1894. Designed by the architectural firm of Sulman & Power, the college's first permanent home still forms the heart of the present building complex and is heritage listed.

The 1887 meeting resolved that the college not be attached to a religious denomination, and that the Colleges' Endowment Act of 1854, which provided for the establishment of the denominational men's colleges, should be subject to the provision that "no religious catechism or formulary distinctive of any particular denomination" should be taught, nor would any attempt be made to attach students to any particular denomination. The College was to be "undenominational". The other elements of the college's role, envisaged in 1887, were to provide "domestic supervision" and "efficient assistance in preparing for university lectures and examinations".

These ideals continue to guide the college in the 21st century. The Women's College now accommodates 260 women undergraduates and 20 postgraduates. It maintains its tradition of being at the forefront of women's education and social theory and championing women's rights, academic thought and leadership.

In the 127 years since its foundation in 1892 more than 7,000 students have been members of the college.

== Buildings and campus ==
In 1894 the Main Building opened with accommodation for 26 students. Designed by Sulman & Power it cost £10,056, a substantial amount of money for the time. In 1916 the College expanded, building "The Cottage" for an extra 6 students. To meet the demand for places after the First World War, "The Maples", a house at the rear of the property was rented and then, in 1919 purchased. Additional student rooms were added in 1924, the back balconies of Main Building closed in, and the Louisa Macdonald Commemoration Dining Hall built.

The next major expansion of College began in 1936, with the construction of the new Williams wing. Named in honour of Susie Jane Williams, the immediate past Principal (1919–1934), it was officially opened by Lady Wakehurst on 6 July 1937, and provided accommodation to 85 students. Further growth in demand after the Second World War led to the building in 1958 of the Reid wing, and further additions to Williams. Designed by Ellice Nosworthy, and supported by a donation given by Mary Reid, it originally provided accommodation for approximately 40 students.

The third major expansion of College took place between 1965 and 1969, with the building of the Langley wing and Menzies Common Room, as well as extensions to the Dining Hall, bringing capacity of College to 280 students. The project was designed by Fowell Mansfield & Maclurcan and funded partially by grants from the Australian Universities Commission. In the mid-1990s the Vere Hole Research Centre and Library was added under the Reid wing, funded by two bequests and a fundraising drive.

In 1999–2000 the Main Building was restored with a grant from the Centenary of Federation Fund.

In 2018 the Sibyl Centre, a purpose-built meeting and conference centre designed by m3architecture, was opened.

== Academic and support programmes ==
Women's College operates a range of programmes designed to encourage students to maximise their academic potential.

=== College Tutorials ===
Throughout both semesters the college runs tutorials in more than thirty subjects, spanning the full range of academic disciplines. Most tutors are senior students, postgraduates or university staff with expertise in their fields and proven teaching skills.

=== Academic assistants ===
Academic Assistants are postgraduates and senior undergraduates who mentor first-year students and facilitate a smooth transition from secondary school to tertiary studies.

=== Resident assistants ===
In addition to academic support, the college appoints a dynamic team of resident assistants (RAs) each year, who provide pastoral care to all students. RAs are students in their senior years of university and having already negotiated the transition to uni and living away from home, they are well equipped to help out others. The RAs help staff and House Committee with many events and college initiatives and are a point of contact for all students. They also assist with the safety and security of the college and are on call for emergencies after hours. They work with the dean of students to ensure that everyone at college feels at home.

== Admissions ==
The college admits between 70 and 100 students annually, in a competitive admissions process which involves a formal application and interview. The process is rolling throughout the year, and applications are accepted for students wishing to enter first year at the University of Sydney, as well as those in subsequent years of study and at post-graduate level.

In addition to residential places, the college offers affiliate membership to enable students to access its academic and social programmes, but maintain independent living elsewhere. Affiliate applications are accepted throughout the year from women at all stages of their tertiary studies.

The Women's College offers a number of scholarships for resident students on the basis of merit and financial need. Scholarships are available to students from government schools, rural areas, Indigenous and Torres Strait Islander backgrounds, postgraduate medical students and students aiming to study at the Conservatorium of Music.

The Grace Frazer Award (est. 1892) is an academic entrance prize given to the student or students who enter the college in their first year of tertiary study with the highest ATAR in their college fresher cohort. It was endowed by Marie Florence (Mrs Charles Burton) Fairfax, who was a member of the Ladies' Committee that raised funds to establish the college and was a member of the College Council from 1891–1893. The scholarship was established in honour of her sister Grace Frazer.

== Philanthropy ==
The college has a strong record of philanthropy. The funds to erect the original Sulman & Power building and to bring the college into being, were raised largely by The Ladies' Committee, formed immediately following the original 1887 meeting. Its president was Lady Carrington (wife of the governor) and its honorary secretary was Miss Mary Fairfax, and it included many other prominent members of Sydney society. This committee was successful in gathering large and small contributions from 496 subscribers sufficient to meet the conditions of the Endowment Act.

Since that time, philanthropy has been a major source of financial support for every new building and capital works programme. As it receives no funding from government or the university, the college continues to look to its community for support in maintaining and expanding its mission.

The Students' Club also runs its own philanthropic activities, with a Charity Committee that raises money and supports a variety of causes. Students and alumnae are encouraged to give back to the college through a variety of financial and service activities.

== Student life ==
=== House Committee ===
All students living at the Women's College are members of the Students' Club, which gives access to all College activities. The House Committee, a group of nine students, is the organising arm of the Students' Club, and it is elected by popular vote of the student body.

=== Leadership ===
The House Committee is led by the senior student. She occupies the highest-ranking student position in the college. Usually a student in her third or fourth year, is a member of the Women's College Council and reports on student activities to council at its meetings throughout the year. The college values the contribution of its senior student very highly. Each year her name is placed on the honour roll in the dining hall. Former senior students include the governor of NSW, Her Excellency Professor Marie Bashir A.C., Dr Meg Mulvey, Ms Jane Diplock and Ms Katrina Dawson.

A wide range of other leadership opportunities are available with an extensive range of student committees, as well as structured in-house leadership programmes designed to enhance individual strengths and build on confidence.

Each year Women's College students in third year and above are invited to participate in a mentoring program which matches students with mentors from a range of industries sourced from both the Women's College Alumnae and contacts external to College. Based on establishing personal contact between the mentor and the mentee, students and mentors are encouraged to meet face to face throughout the year.

=== Senior Common Room ===
The Senior Common Room (SCR) is the group of senior students at College. Membership is extended to all students in fourth year of university and above, and all members have access to the SCR: a secure air-conditioned room with comfortable seating and study facilities, where members often work.

Each year the SCR selects a Senior Representative, who, together with a small social committee and the Senior Research Fellow, co-ordinates the activities of the group and organises a programme of social and academic events.

=== Traditions ===
The College song is "Home of Joy and Knowledge" sung to the tune of "Land of Hope and Glory". It continues to be sung regularly by students at sporting, cultural and other occasions.

The Motto "Together" is a quotation from Tennyson's The Princess which tells the story of an heroic princess who forswears the world of men and founds a women's university where men are forbidden to enter.

The college has a calendar of regular events, including:

- Orientation Week – to welcome the new students.
- Chancellor's Dinner – to award academic prizes.
- Formal Dinner – a weekly gathering of the whole College in academic attire with a speaker.
- Louisa Macdonald Oration – a biennial dinner with guest speaker to honour the founding principal.

== Principals ==
- 1891–1919 Louisa Macdonald was chosen from a field of 65 applicants.
- 1919–1935 Susannah Jane Williams
- 1935 – October 1944 Camilla Wedgwood
- 1944 Julie Fitzhardinge (Acting Principal)
- 1946–1956 Betty Archdale
- 1957–1974 Doreen Moira Langley (like Williams, a former resident student at Janet Clarke Hall, Trinity College (University of Melbourne)
- 1974–1980 Leonie Star BA MA PhD
- 1981–1989 Valerie Street MSc
- 1990–1996 Ann Eyland BSc (Hons) MSc PhD
- 1997–2003 Quentin Bryce AO BA LLB (Hons)
- 2003–2008 Yvonne Rate AM MEd MPhil
- 2008–2013 A. Jane Williamson BEcon BA MA PhD
- 2013–2019 Amanda Bell BA DipEd PhD
- 2020–present Tiffany Donnelly BA (Hons) MA PhD

== Governance ==
The council is the governing body of the Women's College. It consists of ten elected councillors, a treasurer, and four ex-officio councillors. These ex-officio councillors are: the principal of the college, the Senior Student of the college, the president of the Women's College Alumnae, and the person nominated by the Senate of the university. The council has three committees: Governance, Finance and Building & Development.

In 1905 the chair of the council was Senator James Walker.

Emmeline M. D. Woolley was a council member from 1891 to 1908.

== Honorary fellows ==
Honorary fellows of the college are:

- The Honourable Dame Quentin Bryce AD CVO
- Professor the Honorable Dame Marie Bashir AD CVO
- Dr Paul Donnelly
- Janet Flint, honorary librarian
- Stephen Harrison AO
- Dr Janet McCredie AM
- Justice Jane Mathews AO

== Notable alumnae ==
The alumnae of The Women's College have contributed to society across a wide range of fields. Some of their stories are gathered at the Women's College, University of Sydney website

- Her Excellency Marie Bashir – Chancellor of the University of Sydney, first female governor of NSW; Wife of Sir Nicholas Shehadie former Lord Mayor of Sydney.
- Jill Ker Conway – author and scholar
- Marjorie Dalgarno – diagnostic radiologist and pioneer of mammography
- Portia Holman – child psychiatrist
- Tania Major – criminologist and consultant
- Janet McCredie – devised the theory of Neural Crest Injury as being the pathogenesis of congenital malformations of the thalidomide type
- Jeannette McHugh – former Australian Labor Party politician
- Sibyl Morrison – first female practising barrister in NSW; Wife of notable Australian architect, Carlyle Greenwell.
- Phyllis Mary Nicol vice-Principal and physicist lived here from 1921 to 1954
- Ellice Nosworthy – architect
- Mary Puckey – first female superintendent of an Australian hospital
- Jessie Street – feminist activist

== Publications ==
=== Journals and magazines ===
- Sibyl: The Women's College Academic Journal, Vol. 1 (2013) – present.
- The Women's College Magazine

=== Historical publications ===
- Annable, Rosemary, ed., Biographical Register: The Women's College within the University of Sydney, Vol 1: 1892–1939 (1995); Vol 2: 1940–1957 (2005); Vol 3: 1958–68 (2007), (The Women's College, Sydney)
- Annable, Rosemary, Doreen Langley: an ordinary person, an extraordinary life, (Brinkburn Publishing, Bundanoon: 2013)
- Beaumont, Jeanette & W. Vere Hole, Letters from Louisa: A woman's view of the 1890s, based on the letters of Louisa Macdonald, first Principal of The Women's College, University of Sydney, (Allen & Unwin, Sydney: 1996)
- Edwards, Zeny ed., The Women's College within the University of Sydney: an architectural history, 1894–2001, (Centatime Publishing, Sydney: 2001, 2008)
- Hole, W. Vere & Anne H. Treweeke, The history of the Women's College within the University of Sydney, (Halsted Press, Sydney: 1953)
- Prowse, Louise, Tiffany Donnelly & Jane Williamson, Change by degrees: a pictorial history of The Women's College within the University of Sydney, (The Women's College, Sydney: 2012)
