= Doreen Moira Langley =

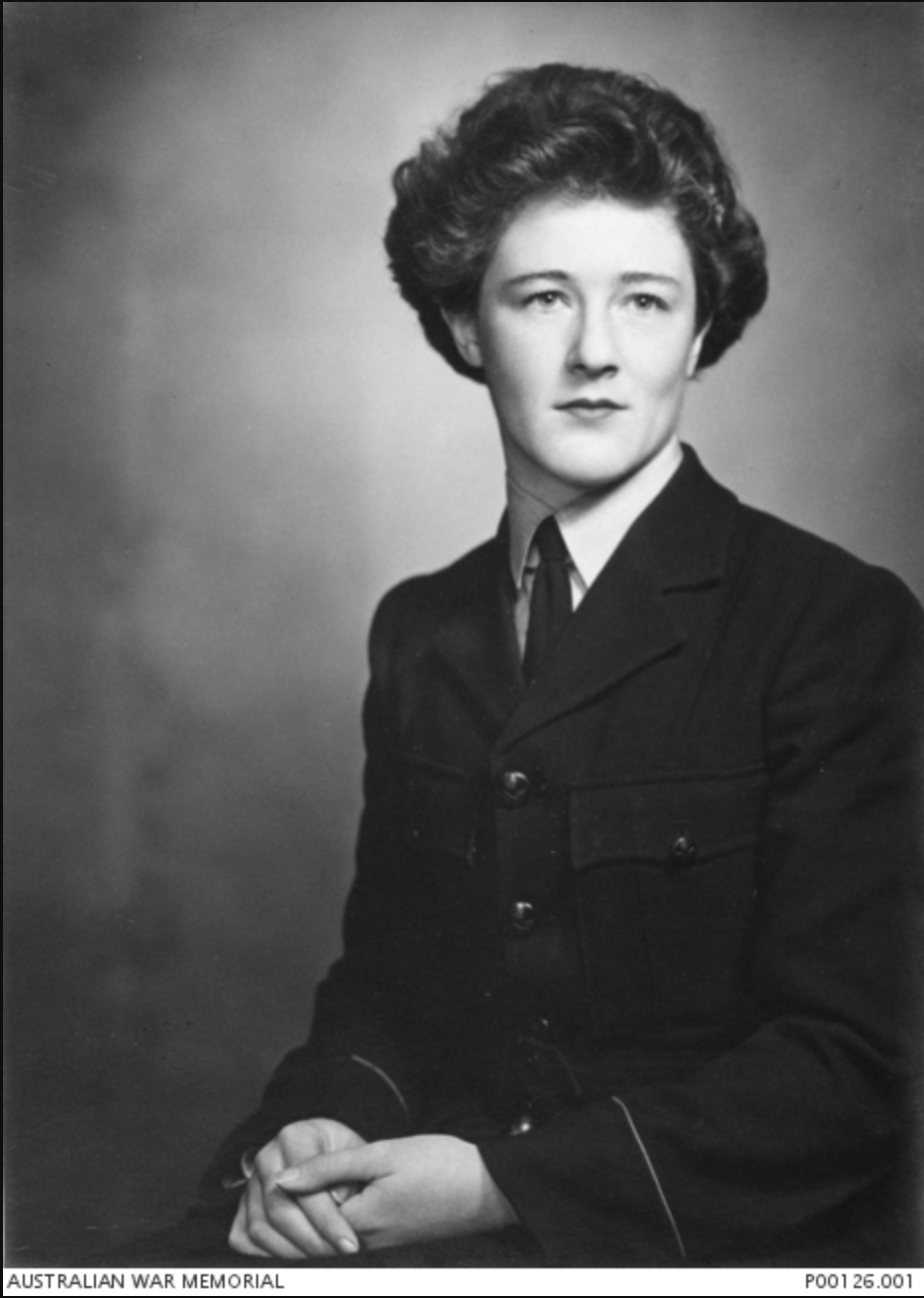
- Doreen Moira Langley in 1943
- Born: 23 January 1920; Sidcup, England
- Died: 19 May 1998 (aged 78); Wahroonga, Australia
- Education: Melbourne Girls Grammar
- Alma mater: University of Melbourne

Doreen Moira Langley MBE (23 January 1920 – 19 May 1998) was an Australian nutritionist and college administrator. She served as a flight officer in the Second World War. She was later principal of the Women’s College at the University of Sydney from 1957 to 1974.

== Biography ==
Doreen Moira Langley was born in London, England. Langley's parents were married in Egypt. Her father was an Australian military officer and her Egyptian-born mother had Irish and French heritage. After moving to Australia, she won a scholarship to Melbourne Church of England Girls Grammar and then attended the University of Melbourne where she held a Bachelor of Science.

In 1943, she joined the Women's Auxiliary Australian Air Force where she lectured mess officers throughout remote Australia. After the war ended, she lectured in nutrition at East Sydney Technical College. She later became principal of the Women’s College at the University of Sydney, succeeding Betty Archdale. She was awarded an MBE in the 1960 Birthday Honours.

Langley died on 19 May 1998 in Wahroonga, New South Wales.
