= Susie Williams =

Australian educator (1875–1942)

- Born: Susannah Jane Williams; 15 September 1875; Castlemaine, Victoria, Australia
- Died: 27 May 1942 (aged 66); Castlemaine, Victoria, Australia
- Education: University of Melbourne
- Occupations: Educator, classicist
- Known for: Principal, The Women's College, University of Sydney

Susannah Jane Williams (15 September 1875 – 27 May 1942), better known as Susie Williams, was an Australian educator. She served for 16 years as principal of The Women's College at the University of Sydney.

== Early life and education ==
Williams was born at Castlemaine in Victoria on 15 September 1875. Her parents were Jane (née Jones) and Welsh-born grocer Edward David Williams. Her father was Member for Castlemaine in the Victorian Legislative Assembly from 1894 to 1904. She completed her secondary education at Castlemaine Grammar School, then attended the University of Melbourne, living at Trinity College Hostel while she studied for a Bachelor of Arts. She graduated in 1897 with first-class honours. She went to England and enrolled at Newnham College, Cambridge reading classics (1897–1901) and also read archaeology at the University of London (1897–1898).

== Career ==
Williams returned to Australia where she tutored in classics at the University of Melbourne. She joined Melbourne Church of England Girls' Grammar School in 1902 as an English and classics teacher and was promoted to head of staff in 1908. In 1914 she returned tutor in classics at Trinity College and became acting principal of Trinity College Hostel in 1919.

In June 1919 Williams was appointed the second principal of The Women's College (TWC) at the University of Sydney, taking over from Louisa Macdonald who had served in the role since it opened in 1892. Under her management, the college grew from 40 to 70 students.

Following her retirement from TWC in 1935 she was appointed principal of University Women's College at the University of Melbourne, overseeing its opening in 1937. She was succeeded by Greta Hort in 1938.
