= Isabella Macdonald Macdonald =

British physician

- Born: 1856; Arbroath, Scotland
- Died: 1947 (aged 90–91)
- Education: London School of Medicine for Women
- Occupation: Physician
- Relatives: Louisa Macdonald (sister)

Isabella Macdonald Macdonald (1856–1947) was one of the first women to graduate as a medical doctor after training in the United Kingdom; she was awarded a Bachelor of Medicine and a Licence of the Society of Apothecaries in 1888, from the London School of Medicine for Women. She went on to have a long career, including as a consultant at the Elizabeth Garrett Anderson Hospital.

== Biography ==
Isabella Macdonald Macdonald was born in 1856, daughter of John Macdonald, lawyer and town-clerk of Arbroath and his wife Ann, née Kid (d.1860). The couple had eleven children including seven daughters. Her younger sister, Louisa Macdonald was an educationist and suffragist.

She was an early student of the London School of Medicine for Women, established to provide a route by which women could acquire the credentials necessary to become a registered physician in the UK.

She graduated in 1888 as a doctor of medicine (MB) and pharmacist. She practiced initially, for three years, as the resident physician at Cama Hospital, Mumbai, returning to the UK with ill-health. Thereafter she worked for many years at the Elizabeth Garrett Anderson Hospital, rising to the level of consultant physician and retiring in 1925. She maintained a private practice operating from her house in Seymour Street, Portman Square until 1940, when the property was destroyed as the result of a wartime bombing.

Her 1947 obituary makes no mention of any marriages. She died, aged 91, in 1947.
