= Mungo William MacCallum =

Australian academic administrator

Mungo William MacCallum KCMG
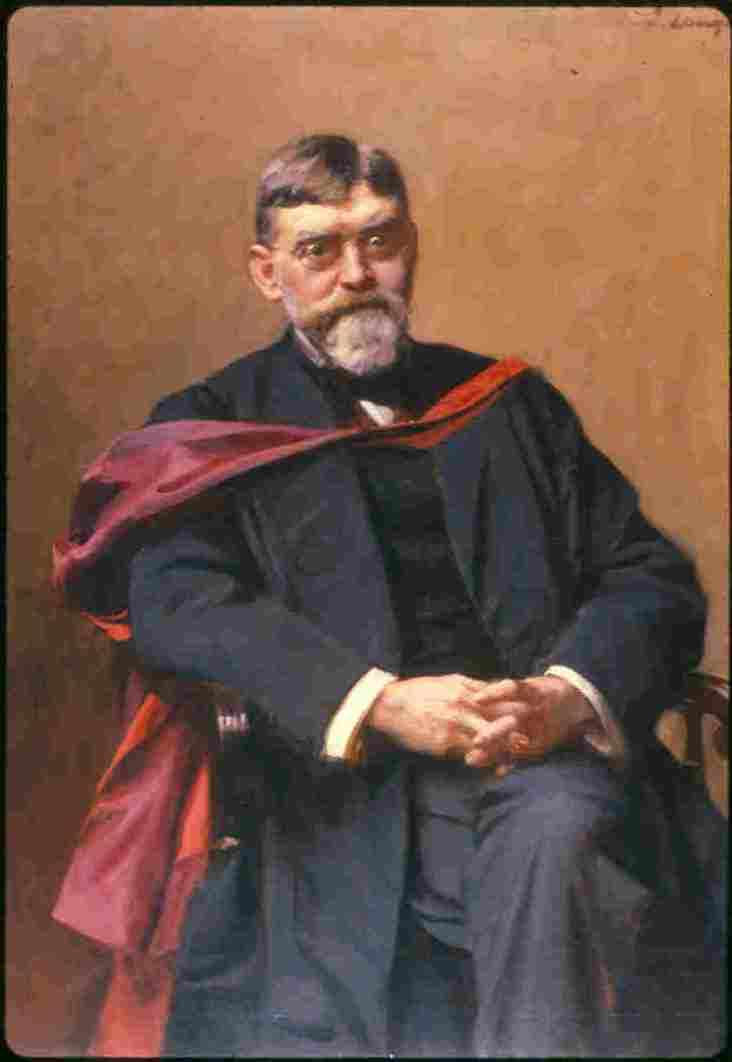

Chancellor of the University of Sydney
- In office 1934–1936

Personal details
- Born: 26 February 1854 Glasgow, Scotland
- Died: 3 September 1942 (aged 88)
- Spouse: Dorette Margaretha Peters
- Education: University of Glasgow; Humboldt University of Berlin; University of Leipzig
- Occupation: literary critic

Sir Mungo William MacCallum KCMG (26 February 1854 – 3 September 1942) was Chancellor of the University of Sydney from 1934 to 1936, and a noted literary critic.

== Early life ==
Mungo William MacCallum was born in Glasgow, Scotland, the son of Mungo MacCallum, merchant, and his wife Isabella, née Renton. He studied at the University of Glasgow and at Berlin and Leipzig. In Germany MacCallum concentrated on medieval literature, he published several articles in the Cornhill Magazine in 1879–80. In 1884 he published Studies in Low German and High German literature.

== Academic career ==
MacCallum became Professor of Literature at the University of Wales, Aberystwyth in 1879, but moved to Sydney in 1887 to take up the post of Foundation Professor of Modern Language and Literature at the University of Sydney, MacCallum was chosen over 44 other candidates. He set about increasing the status of English, French and German in the curriculum and to that end instituted a tradition of prizes, personally funded by him, for undergraduates demonstrating proficiency in English (the prize would from 1920 be known as The MacCallum Prize).

In 1897, MacCallum became president of the Sydney University Union. In 1898, he was made Dean of the Faculty of Arts. In April 1928, MacCallum was elected deputy chancellor and became Chancellor of the university in 1934. The Mungo MacCallum Building at the University of Sydney was named in his honour. He wrote a number of works of literary criticism on English and German literature, and is most notable for his work on Shakespeare.

In 1894, MacCallum published a book Tennyson's Idylls of the King and Arthurian Story from the 16th century in which he traced the Arthurian story from its 'Brythonic' origins through Thomas Malory and up to its final phase in Lord Tennyson.

During the first world war he was in favour of Australia's involvement but he objected strongly to the anti-German discrimination.

In 1928, he became the deputy chancellor of the university and from 1934 to 1936 he was the chancellor.

== Personal life ==
MacCallum married Dorette Margaretha Peters in 1882 at Elbstorf in Lower Saxony and they had three children. Lady MacCallum was a founder of the National Council of Women of New South Wales and president in 1919–28. She also worked for The Infants' Home Child and Family Services the Sydney Day Nursery and Nursery Schools' Association, the Australian Board of Missions, the New Settlers' League of Australia, the Royal Society for the Welfare of Mothers and Babies and the Sydney University Women's Society (Settlement). They had a daughter, Isabella Renton MacCallum, and two sons: Mungo Lorenz MacCallum (1884–1934), Rhodes scholar in 1906, who would go on to lecture in Roman Law at the University of Sydney; and Walter Paton MacCallum, who became a Brigadier general in the Australian Army. His grandson Mungo Ballardie MacCallum and great-grandson Mungo Wentworth MacCallum were both noted journalists.

== Critical legacy ==
In his 1967 foreword to Shakespeare's Roman Plays and Their Background, Terence Spencer of the Shakespeare Institute judged MacCallum's "indispensable" 1910 book as unusual in having "outlasted changes of fashion in criticism."

== Works ==
- Tennyson's Idylls of the king and Arthurian Story from the 16th Century (1894)
- Shakespeare's Roman Plays and their background (1910)
