= Joan Fry (educator) =

Joan Fry, OBE (31 December 1920 – 2 February 2006) was an educator and a leading political advocate of early childhood education in Australia.

== Early life ==
Joan Fry's aunt was Mildred Muscio, a NSW and national President of the National Council of Women of Australia. Fry was born on 31 December 1920, and grew up along the Murray River. She attended Hornsby Girls’ High School in Sydney, Australia.

== Professional career in early childhood education and care ==
After leaving high school at age 16, Joan Fry enrolled at the Sydney Day Nursery Association’s pioneering Nursery School Training Centre at Woolloomooloo, Sydney, where she graduated with a nursery school teaching diploma in 1941. This was at a time when there were few professional career opportunities available to women. She joined the Association’s Woolloomooloo Day Nursery and Nursery School as a nursery school teacher, advancing to the role of Director in 1944.

In 1946, Fry was awarded a scholarship by the Thyne Reid Education Trust, to study child development at the University of London. During this time, she represented Australia at the preliminary meeting in 1946 of what was to become the Organisation Mondiale Pour L’education Prescolaire – World Organization for Early Childhood Education (OMEP).

Returning to Australia, Fry was appointed as lecturer of child development at the Nursery School Training College, then Vice-Principal and Supervisor of Practical Training in 1949, Director of Pre-school Training in 1951, and then Principal of the then named Nursery School Teachers’ College in 1966.

It was while Principal of the Nursery School Teachers’ College that Fry was invited by the Australian Federal Government to chair the government's first Australian Pre-schools Committee. She left the teachers’ college in 1973 and authored the government publication ‘Care and education of young children: report of the Australian Pre-schools Committee’ published in 1974. The report advocated for the funding of quality preschools and professional qualified teachers. Joan Fry was awarded the OBE in 1979.

== Political advocacy ==
Throughout her career, Joan Fry advocated for quality early childhood education and care. She presented at conferences, and appeared in the media as an early childhood education expert. She was an active member of the Australian Pre-school Association. In 1956 she was sent through the Colombo Plan by the Commonwealth Department of External Affairs to Singapore to conduct research on the needs of Singapore nursery schools. Fry led an Australian delegation at the 1964 OMEP World Assembly in Stockholm, Sweden. In the 1970s, as a policy advisor to the Australian Government, she visited and had discussions with Aboriginal early childhood education services in the Northern Territory, Australia.

A biography of Joan Fry's life and work authored by Leone Huntsman was published by SDN Children's Services in 2016, and won an Australian Society of Archivists’ Mander Jones Award.
