= Janet McCredie =

Australian radiologist (1935–2023)

Janet McCredie AM (1935–2023) was an Australian radiologist who originated the theory of Neural Crest Injury as being the pathogenesis of congenital malformations of the thalidomide type. She was also one of the instigators of BreastScreen NSW.

== Biography ==
McCredie was born in Campsie, New South Wales on 14 March 1935 to Marjorie Dalgarno, a pioneering radiologist, while her father was obstetrician. She studied medicine in the 1950s at the University of Sydney, graduating in 1959, and then undertook postgraduate studies in radiology in the UK. She chose to specialise in radiology, the same field as her mother, and worked as a radiologist at the Royal Prince Alfred Hospital, Sydney from 1965 to 1972.

In 1970, about 10 years after thalidomide was withdrawn from sale, McCredie was asked whether X-rays could help determine who were true thalidomide victims entitled to compensation from the manufacturer. During her investigations, she observed the way in which thalidomide caused malformations and also discovered a new mechanism of embryogenesis. Her findings were published in The Lancet in 1973.

From 1975, McCredie was a Senior Lecturer in Diagnostic Radiology at the University of Sydney, at the same time undertaking a PhD, titled "Neural crest defects : a radiological study of certain congenital malformations". She was promoted to Associate Professor of Radiology in 1980.

During the 1980s, she played a crucial role in introducing mammography as a method for early detection of breast cancer, an idea initially advocated by her mother.

In 1994, she was appointed a Member of the Order of Australia for "service to medicine, particularly radiology, and the study of congenital abnormalities of the limbs of newborn babies".

McCredie's book, Beyond Thalidomide: Birth Defects Explained, was published by the Royal Society of Medicine Press in 2007.

McCredie died on 13 July 2023.
