= Dorette MacCallum =

German teacher (1863 – 1952)

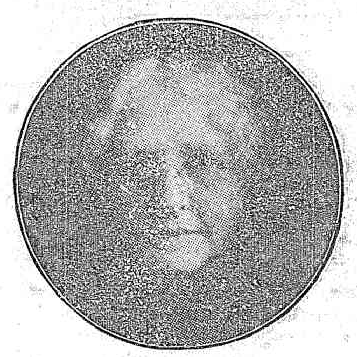
- in 1926
- Born: Dorette Margarethe Peters; 1863; Elbstorf
- Died: July 4, 1952 (aged 88–89); Rose Bay
- Other names: Lady MacCallum
- Occupation: languages teacher
- Spouse: Mungo William MacCallum

Dorette Margarethe (Dorothea) MacCallum (1863 – July 4, 1952) was a teacher of French and German. She became an Australian community worker and a leading figure at the University of Sydney and Australian public life after she emigrated in 1886.

== Life ==
MacCallum was born in the small village of Elbstorf in Lower Saxony 1863, where she married in 1882. She had met her Scottish-born husband, Mungo William MacCallum, in Aberystwyth in west Wales, where he was a professor, and she was teaching French and German. She emigrated in 1886 to Australia, where her husband had become a professor at the University of Sydney. She had her interests but became a hostess, which assisted her and her husband's career.

In 1895/6, the National Council of Women was formed, and she was at the initial meeting. In 1900, she and her family moved to a new house that was placed in her name. The home was well out of Sydney in Woollahra, which could only be accessed by a track. The house was named Bryn y Mor, which was Welsh for "hill by the sea".

She was a supporter of women's suffrage and she became the President of the Sydney University Women's Sports Association (SUWSA) in 1910. She had been a leading figure of the University Tennis Club and this was one of the three clubs that merged to create the SUWSA. 24 women students were present, this was a lower percentage representation than for male students. Each of the women present were asked to sign their commitment to support the SUWSA as the new body intended to challenge the monopoly of the Sydney University Sports Union (of men) over the university's playing fields. One of the two dozen women was Jessie Lillingston who would go on to lead similar challenges to the patriarchy.

In 1914, the Sydney University Women's Union was formed. In time, she would be the Union's patron. This was the year the First World War started. Her husband supported the empire and the war but objected strongly to anti-German discrimination.

MacCallum was a founder of the National Council of Women of New South Wales and president in 1919–28. In 1926 her husband became a Knight Commander of the Order of St Michael and St George and she became Lady Dorette MacCallum.

MacCallum worked for The Infants' Home Child and Family Services the Sydney Day Nursery and Nursery Schools' Association, the Australian Board of Missions, the Royal Society for the Welfare of Mothers and Babies and the New Settlers' League of Australia. Her work with the Sydney University Women's Society (aka Settlement) led to her and her daughter contributing funds that enabled the purchase of a property in the Sydney suburb of Chippendale.

== Private life ==
She and Mungo had a daughter, Isabella Renton MacCallum, and three sons. One son died as a child, another, Mungo Lorenz MacCallum (1884–1934), Rhodes scholar in 1906, who would go on to lecture in Roman Law at the University of Sydney; and Walter Paton MacCallum, who became a Brigadier general in the Australian Army.

Mungo died in 1948 and she died in the Sydney suburb of Rose Bay in 1952.
