= Ellice Nosworthy =

Australian architect

Ellice Maud Nosworthy
- Born: 25 February 1897; Neutral Bay, Sydney, New South Wales, Australia
- Died: 7 January 1972 (aged 74); Killara, New South Wales, Australia
- Education: The Women's College, University of Sydney
- Occupation: Architect

Ellice Maud Nosworthy (25 February 1897 – 7 January 1972) was an Australian practising architect for approximately 50 years and graduated as one of Australia's first female architects in 1922.

== Early life and education ==
Nosworthy, was a second of four daughters of Robert Nosworthy, who originated from England. Ellice attended Redlands Girls' School in Cremorne, New South Wales, under Gertrude Roseby. At the University of Sydney she enrolled in arts in 1917, Where Leslie Wilkinson arrived at the university the following year to establish the nation's first architecture course, Nosworthy transferred into the new facility with the first group of students then transferred to architecture in 1919 and studied under Professor Leslie Wilkinson. She lived at The Women's College, University of Sydney, where she won in both 1919 and 1921, the Dickinson Cup for tennis.

== Career ==
Ellice was employed (1922–23) by Waterhouse & Lake, where she worked on the drawings for houses in Sydney, and she became the first woman registered as an architect on 26 June 1923 in New South Wales. After travelling and working in Europe in 1924, she practised from her parents' home at Treatts Road in Lindfield and focused on domestic architecture, with the clientele consisting largely of north shore friends and acquaintances. The following year she established her own practice which operated within her parents home.

From 1956, she conducted her practice from her own home built to her specifications. She generally employed women architects, including Barbara Munro, Louise Hutchinson, Libby Hall and Brigid Wilkinson. Nosworthy made several extensive study and working trips to North America and Britain between 1929 and 1938; and was employed by the Department of the Interior during World War II. During World War II, Nosworthy also worked for the Allied Works Council.

It was between the 1920s and the 1970s that she became a member of the Royal Australian Institute of Architects (RAIA) and the Royal Institute of British Architects (RIBA), later being elevated to Fellow status for both. During this time she also became a member of the Australian Federation of University Women, during which she attended the international federation's conference in Mexico City (1964) and visited South America.

Various homes designed by Ellice Nosworthy were published during the 1940s supported by photographic documentation by Max Duplain and Harold Cazneaux. These photographs show extensive single-storeyed houses with minimal aesthetic detail, leaning around courtyards and with an importance on interconnections between interior and exterior spaces.

Throughout WWII, Nosworthy also worked for the Allied Works Council. From 1941 to 1972 she was the Honorary Architect for the Women's College at the University of Sydney, providing free advice for the maintenance of its buildings and designing several substantial additions, among them an air-raid shelter (1942) under the cloister and the (Mary) Reid wing (1958) which accommodated thirty-one students. She frequently donated her fees for such work to the college's building appeal. In the late 1950s she collaborated with Wilkinson on additions to St Andrew's College, University of Sydney. Furthermore, apart from her domestic practice, she designed childcare centres for the Sydney Day Nursery and Nursery Schools Association at Erskineville, NSW (1945) and Newtown, NSW(1955), and for the Ku-ring-gai Council at Gordon, NSW (1950) as well as the construction of Karitane (the Australian Mothercraft Society, derived from the New Zealand organisation). Her family has donated of a large archive of her drawings and professional documents to the National Library of Australia.

- 1917 Commenced an Arts degree at the University of Sydney in 1917 before transferring into the newly established architecture course under Professor Leslie Wilkinson in 1918.
- 1923: Nosworthy became one of the first women registered architects in New South Wales.
- 1941–1972: She was the Honorary Architect for the Women's College at the University of the Sydney.
- 1948: Member of the Royal Institute of British Architects.
- 1958–1959: The Young Women's Christian Association.
- 1957–1958: The Reid wing of The Women's College.
- 1964: A member of the Australian Federation of University Women, she attended the International federation's conference in Mexico City and visited South America.
- 1970: A fellow of the Royal Australian Institute of Architects and an associate.

== Notable projects ==
Nosworthy worked for the Architectural Association along with other young Australia architects in the 1930s, such as Robert Cummings, Winsome Hall Andrew, Roy Prentice and Robert Atkinson. The peninsula was the setting for other iconic works of the 20th-century residential architecture by Australian architects, including Nosworthy herself.

The Women's College Reid wing was designed by Nosworthy along with, common and music rooms in a two storied face brickwork and terracotta-tiled addition. Due to the financial constraints of post-war conditions, aluminium-framed windows were a necessary addition instead of traditional timber-hung sashes, followed by her additions to the Williams Wing and Staff accommodation on the Campus. In 1960 Leslie Wilkinson and Nosworthy added a new dining call to St Andrew's College which included a spacious Junior common room below, situated between St Andrew's North Wing and Missenden road.

As one of the interwar generation of women architects, Norsworthy along with other significant Australians, made a significant contribution to Australian architecture, from domestic projects through to large institutional and industrial complexes, demonstrating what A.G. Stephenson had stated 'there's nothing in architecture a man can do that a woman can't do'.

- 1922 and 1923: Worked for Waterhouse & Lake.
- 1942: Four blocks of community housing for the Kuringgai Older Peoples's Welfare Association.
- 1945: Childcare centres for the Sydney Day Nursery & Nursery Schools Association at Erskineville.
- 1950: The Kuringgai Municipal Council at Gordon and alterations to St Andrew's College at the university.
- 1955: Childcare centres for the Sydney Day Nursery & Nursery Schools Association at Newtown.
- 1956: She conducted her practice from her own home, built to her specifications in her parents' orchard.
- 1959–1960: Nosworthy made additions to Williams Wing of The Women's College.
- 1960: St Andrew's College, Nosworthy and Professor Leslie Wilkinson cleverly inserted a new dining hall seating over 300, with a spacious Junior Common Room below.
- 1960: Community housing for the Kuringgai Old People's Welfare Association.
- 1960s: A late but major project in the 1960s was the design of 'Arrunga', four blocks of the flats for single elderly people for the Kuringgai Old People's Welfare Association (KOPWA) at Lindfield, New South Wales, a rare and still successful community-based housing initiative. Historian Bronwyn Hanna notes the project is an important example of the ability of design to contribute to local communities.

== Achievements ==
Nosworthy was one of the first eight graduates of the Faculty of Architecture and one of its first three women graduates, graduating with a Bachelor of Architecture in 1922.

While a student at the university, she was treasurer of the Sydney University Women's Undergraduates Association Committee in 1918, and lived at the Women's College, where she won the Dickinson Cup for tennis in 1919 and in 1921. She was one of two architects to be the first registered in New South Wales when registration began in June 1923 and one of the first women to set up their own architectural practices.

== Other references ==
Notable projects references

- Watermark Architectural Guides University of Sydney Architecture, Trevor Howells, Watermark press 2007
- Trove.nla.gov.au
- Adb.anu.edu.au
- Bronwyn Hanna 'Absence and Presence, A Historiography of Early Women Architects in NSW', PhD, UNSW, 2000. Respondents and people interviewed in this study who mentioned Ellice Nosworthy as an admired pioneer included: Robert Bland, Catherine Brink, Dierdre Broughton, Louise Cox, Constance Crisp, Eleanor Cullis-Hill, Beryl Fakes, Margaret Harvey-Sutton, Marjorie Holroyde, Judith Macintosh, Josephine Martin and Caroline Roberts, Janet Single and Gwen Wilson.
- Bronwyn Hanna, 'Ellice Nosworthy', Constructive Times, no.49, 1997, pp. 4–7.
- Julie Willis and Bronwyn Hanna, Women Architects in Australia, 1900–1950, RAIA, Canberra, 2001.

Working career references

- The Encyclopedia of Australia Architecture, edited by Philip Goad and Julie Willis, Cambridge University press 2012
- Adb.anu.edu.au

== See also ==
- List of women architects
