= Sydney Day Nursery Association =

Australian organisation

The Sydney Day Nursery Association was an Australian organisation established in Sydney on 3 August 1905 to provide long day care for young children. It was the first organised provider of such services in New South Wales, created in response to the growing needs of working-class families during the early 20th century. The Association later evolved into SDN Children's Services and continues to operate in New South Wales and the Australian Capital Territory.

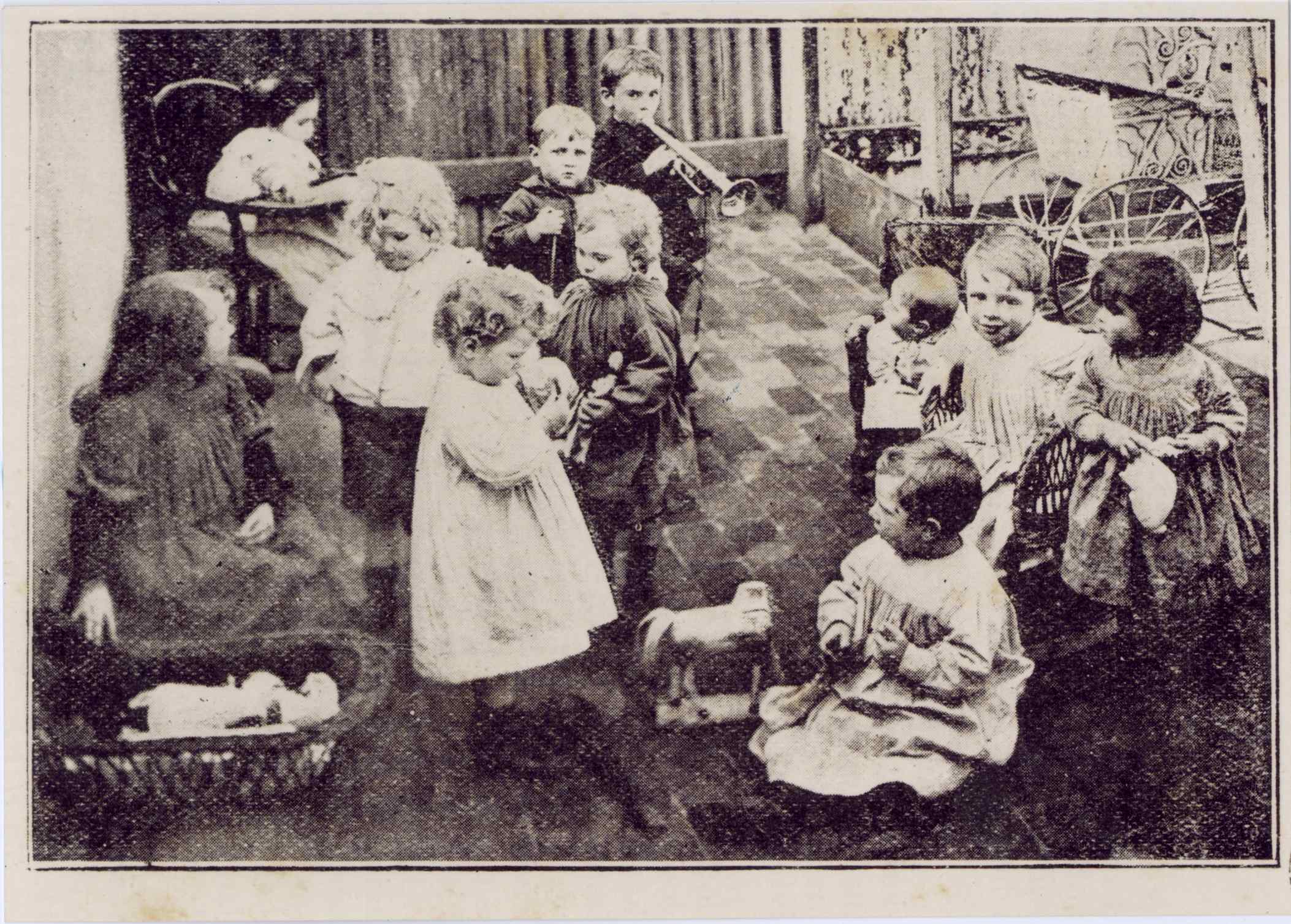
Children playing in the courtyard of the long day nursery at 126 Dowling Street, Woolloomooloo, Sydney in 1906.

== History ==
=== Formation ===
It was the first organised long day care in New South Wales.

In the early 1900s in Sydney, working-class women in the role of sole or co-family breadwinner had no options for professional long day child care. In 1905, a group of politicised and energetic women from Sydney's affluent families formed the Sydney Day Nursery Association to meet the need for long day care for babies and infants. On 3 August 1905, they held a meeting "for the purpose of organising a movement to establish a Creche".

On 7 December 1905, these well-connected women opened the Association's first long day nursery in a terrace house at 126 Dowling Street, Woolloomooloo. From the outset the Association appointed trained staff. Its first employee was qualified nurse Matron Sarah Breden, one of the first professionally trained nurses in New South Wales. For threepence a day, children were bathed, fed, clothed and cared for, from 7.00am to 6.30pm.

=== Members ===
These women were organised and strategic, and knew how to leverage the medical, business, legal and social circles in which they moved. They came to the Sydney Day Nursery Association via diverse paths, with Ethel Davenport leading as the first president and Her Excellency Lady Alice Northcote presiding as its first patron. Poet Dorothea Mackellar, Marguerite Fairfax and Linda Littlejohn (née Teece) were early members of the Sydney Day Nursery Association's governing committee. Esteemed physicians, Dr Charles Bickerton Blackburn, Dr Wilfred Fairfax, and later Dr Charles Clubbe, provided honorary medical services during the Association's pioneering years. Subsequent presidents included Lady Dorette MacCallum, and Donalda McElhone (1937–1963).

=== 1930s ===
On 6 October 1931, the Association established New South Wales’ first nursery school and in 1932 its first Nursery School Training Centre (later renamed the Nursery School Teachers’ College) to train professional nursery school teachers. The nursery schools provided an innovative educational program for children aged two years to school age in a long day care setting, which led to its renaming in 1937 as the Sydney Day Nursery and Nursery Schools Association. Joan Fry OBE, principal of the Nursery School Teachers’ College (1966–1972), later became a lobbyist and Australian Commonwealth Government advisor on early years care and education, and in 1973 authored ‘Care and education of young children : report of the Australian Pre-schools Committee’ – commonly known as ‘The Fry Report’.

=== 1940s ===
Over subsequent decades the Association opened more nurseries, expanding into working-class areas and suburban Sydney, and later rural New South Wales and the Australian Capital Territory. One of Australia's first female architects, Ellice Nosworthy, designed the Association's Melanie Alexander nursery school in Newtown in the 1950s and the rebuilt Erskineville nursery school in the 1940s. In 1975 the Federal Government began administering the Nursery School Teachers’ College, by 1981 becoming the Institute of Early Childhood Studies, and by 1994 incorporated into Macquarie University.

=== 1990s ===
Since the late 1990s, this not-for-profit organisation has been known as SDN Children's Services (with a charitable subsidiary, SDN Child and Families Services). SDN operates 24 early children's education and care centres and a range of child and family support programs and disability services for children in New South Wales and the Australian Capital Territory. In 2002 the SDN Archive was established and in 2017 its archive and museum collection is located at Broadway, Sydney with appointment-based public access.
