= Mungo Ballardie MacCallum =

Australian journalist, broadcaster and poet (1913–1999)

- Born: John Mungo Ballardie MacCallum; 11 December 1913; Point Piper, Sydney, Australia
- Died: 12 July 1999 (aged 85); Sydney, Australia
- Spouse(s): Diana Wentworth (m. 1939); Polly MacCallum (m. 1972)
- Children: Mungo Wentworth MacCallum
- Parent: Mungo Lorenz MacCallum (father)
- Relatives: Mungo William MacCallum (grandfather)

John Mungo Ballardie MacCallum (commonly known as Mungo Ballardie MacCallum, 11 December 1913 – 12 July 1999) was an Australian journalist, broadcaster and poet.

== Early life ==
MacCallum was born in Point Piper, Sydney on 11 December 1913. His father was Mungo Lorenz MacCallum, a Rhodes Scholar, barrister and journalist, and son of Dorette and Mungo William MacCallum, Chancellor of the University of Sydney. He attended Sydney Grammar School and studied arts at the University of Sydney.

== Career ==
MacCallum began as a cadet journalist with the Sydney Morning Herald during his second year at the University of Sydney, shortly before his father's death in 1934. In 1941 he joined the Army Education Service as the editor of SALT, a journal written by and by Australian troops, with contributions from several well-known Australian writers and from MacCallum himself. SALT was popular throughout the armed forces and was valued also by many Australian officials and war correspondents.

After the end of the War and the closure of SALT (1946), MacCallum worked for several years as a columnist with The Sun before joining the ABC in 1952. After a stint at the BBC, he helped produce the first night of television in Australia in 1956. He wrote occasional pieces on cricket for The Australian Financial Review.

His books included two novels, Voyage of Love, and Son of Mars, and a memoir, Plankton's Luck. Later, in the 1960s, he wrote for Nation, chiefly television and book criticism.

He had a son, Mungo Wentworth MacCallum, with his first wife, Diana Wentworth. Also writing as Mungo MacCallum, he is perhaps best known for his work in Nation Review.

== Death ==
MacCallum died in Sydney on 12 July 1999.
