= Mungo Wentworth MacCallum =

Australian political journalist (1941–2020)

- Born: 21 December 1941; Sydney, New South Wales, Australia
- Died: 9 December 2020 (aged 78); Ocean Shores, New South Wales, Australia
- Occupations: Political journalist and commentator
- Spouse: Jenny Garrett

Mungo Wentworth MacCallum (21 December 1941 – 9 December 2020) was an Australian political journalist and commentator.

MacCallum was once described by Gough Whitlam as a "tall, bearded descendant of lunatic aristocrats". His father, Mungo Ballardie MacCallum (1913–1999), was a journalist and pioneer of television in Australia, and his great-grandfather, Sir Mungo MacCallum (1854–1942), had been a prominent scholar and university administrator. His mother, Diana Wentworth, was a great-granddaughter of the Australian explorer and politician William Charles Wentworth (1790–1872). Her brother, William Charles Wentworth IV (1907–2003), was a Liberal member for the Division of Mackellar in the House of Representatives, where he was a vociferous exponent of anti-communism, and of distinctive views on many other issues.

== Early life ==
MacCallum was born in Sydney and educated at the elite Cranbrook School, a short walk from where he lived with his parents next door to his grandmother's house in Wentworth Street, Point Piper. After leaving school, he went to the University of Sydney, where he obtained a BA with third-class honours.

== Career ==
MacCallum was known for his strongly centre-left, pro-Labor views, being critical both of the conservative Liberal and National Parties, and of the far left (e.g., communists) who attacked Labor for its cautious reformism. From the 1970s to the 1990s, he covered Australian federal politics from the Canberra Press Gallery for The Australian, the National Times, The Sydney Morning Herald, Nation Review and radio stations 2JJ / Triple J and 2SER.

During the 1980s, he moved to Ocean Shores, on the north coast of New South Wales. He continued to write political commentary, notably for the Australian Broadcasting Corporation (ABC) current affairs and news analysis program The Drum, and for the magazine The Monthly. He appeared on Australia's national Community Radio Network; and contributed columns for the Byron Shire Echo and The Northern Star, and cryptic crosswords for The Saturday Paper.

He was the author of several books, including Run, Johnny, Run, written after the 2004 Australian federal election. His autobiographical narrative of the Australian political scene, Mungo: the man who laughs, has been reprinted four times. How To Be A Megalomaniac or, Advice to a Young Politician was published in 2002, and Political Anecdotes was published in 2003. In December 2004, Duffy & Snellgrove published War and Pieces: John Howard's last election.

On 8 September 2014, there was a minor sensation when a false report of his death was contained in a tweet on the social media site Twitter. The matter was clarified within the hour but, within the same hour, a trending hashtag #mungolives had sprung up on the same site.

On 2 December 2020, MacCallum announced on the website "Pearls and Irritations" that, due to deteriorating health, he was ending his journalistic career. He was suffering from throat cancer, prostate cancer, and heart disease, and he died on 9 December 2020, aged 78.

== Legal issues ==
MacCallum was sued for defamation or libel on a number of occasions. In 1971, he published an article regarding former ALP leader Arthur Calwell and several of his factional colleagues, which Calwell claimed portrayed him as disloyal to his successor Gough Whitlam and to the party. Calwell successfully sued for defamation, but the decision was overturned in 1975 on appeal to the High Court in Calwell v Ipex Australia Ltd. In 1976, MacCallum was sued by cabinet ministers Margaret Guilfoyle and Jim Killen for an article alleging they were having an affair with each other. In 1977, he and his publisher was sued by ambassador James Cumes for a 1974 article which "pictured him as vulgar, crass and without sensitivity" in relation to an official visit to China, with Cumes also stating that MacCallum had verbally referred to him as "top of the list" of "fascists or Nazis" within the Department of Foreign Affairs. Cumes received a public apology and was awarded damages of $9,000 (equivalent to $50,000 in 2022) in August 1978, as well as legal costs.

== Bibliography ==
- Girt By Sea: Australia, the Refugees and the Politics of Fear, March 2002, Quarterly Essay 5 ISBN 978-1-86395-123-4
- From Nation To Now, May 2005, The Monthly 1
- The Vanishing. It wasn't the time, but he was the leader Labor had to have, May 2005, The Monthly 4
- Evolution Baby, October 2005, The Monthly 6
- Poll Dancing, December 2007, Black Inc. books
- Australian Story: Kevin Rudd and the Lucky Country, Quarterly Essay 36 December 2009, ISBN 978-1-86395-457-0
- Punch and Judy: The Double Disillusion Election Of 2010 Penguin Books ISBN 978-1-86395-511-9

=== Book reviews ===
Year	Review article	Work(s) reviewed
2009	MacCallum, Mungo (Autumn 2009). "There's something about Gough (1)". Overland. 194: 80–81.	Hocking, Jenny. Gough Whitlam : a moment in history. Melbourne: Miegunyah Press.
