= Marjorie Dalgarno =

Australian radiologist and a pioneer of mammography

Marjorie Clare Dalgarno (1901–1983) was an Australian radiologist and a pioneer of mammography. She performed the first mammogram in Australia at the Rachel Forster Hospital and demonstrated the benefits of mammography as a breast cancer screening tool.

== Biography ==
Dalgarno was born in Sydney in 1901 and studied medicine at the University of Sydney's Women's College. She graduated in 1925 and was hired as a resident medical officer at the Royal Prince Alfred Hospital, where she worked in the radiology department. After marrying Harold McCredie, a general practitioner, in 1928, she established a radiological practice based out of their home in Campsie. Her home practice included an x-ray machine installed in the dining room and a laundry that was converted into a darkroom for developing x-ray films. In 1939, she began working at the Rachel Forster Hospital in Redfern and the Renwick Hospital for Infants in Summer Hill; she also worked at the Western Suburbs Hospital in Croydon during World War II.

In 1949, Dalgarno and her partner Mollie Cronin opened a new practice on Macquarie Street in central Sydney. She also continued to work at the Rachel Forster Hospital, where Kathleen Cuningham had established a clinic for the diagnosis and treatment of breast lumps. Dalgarno modified an x-ray machine so that it could be used to produce mammograms (low-energy x-rays of the breasts), and in the early 1950s she performed the first mammogram in Australia. In a study of 1000 asymptomatic women, she demonstrated the benefits of mammography as a screening tool to detect and treat breast cancer in its early stages, but widespread use of mammography was unfeasible at the time due to technological limitations and high radiation doses. Dalgarno died in 1983.

== Legacy ==
Australia adopted a national breast cancer screening program three decades after Dalgarno's work on mammography. BreastScreen, an Australian organisation that provides free breast cancer screening for eligible women, named one of their mobile screening buses "Marjorie" in honour of Dalgarno.
