= Louisa Macdonald =

Educationist and women's suffragist

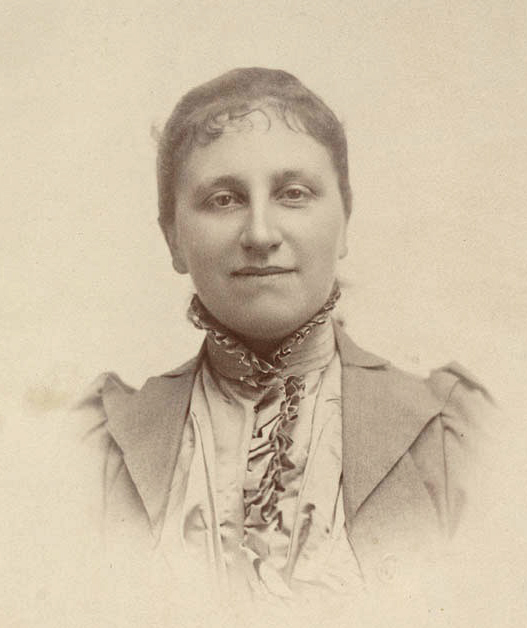
- Miss Louisa Macdonald, Principal of the Women's College, c. 1890s
- Born: 10 December 1858; Arbroath, Scotland
- Died: 28 November 1949 (aged 90); London, England
- Education: University College, London (BA 1884, MA 1886)
- Known for: Principal of the Women's College, University of Sydney

Louisa Macdonald (10 December 1858 – 28 November 1949) was an educationist and women's suffragist.

== Early life and education ==
Louisa Macdonald was born in 1858 in Arbroath, Scotland, the eleventh child of Ann (née Kid) and John Macdonald, town clerk and lawyer. Louisa and her sister Isabella enrolled at the University College, London, where they were among the first residents in College Hall. Macdonald graduated with a Bachelor of Arts in 1884 with first class honours in classics and honours in German. She graduated with a Master of Arts in classics in 1886 and took up an immediate career in education by providing lectures and private lessons for students of College Hall.

== Professional career ==
By 1891 Macdonald had become a Fellow of the University College, London. Macdonald was chosen from a field of 65 applicants to be the founding principal of the Women's College at the University of Sydney, and took up her position in rented premises at 'Strathmore' in Glebe in March 1892, with four students. Macdonald played an active role in the design and equipping of the Women's College buildings, designed by architects John Sulman and John Porter Power to accommodate 26 students, which opened in 1894.

Macdonald worked tirelessly to establish prosperity for the college, both economically and culturally, at a time when women's education was a low priority and in limited demand. Aided by her lifelong friend and companion, Evelyn Dickinson, Macdonald sought to establish a strong foundation for supporting women's education, based on values of social and intellectual equality. The architecture and grounds of the college reflected Macdonald's belief that gracious surroundings were an essential part of a liberal education.

== Suffragism ==
Macdonald was actively involved in university life and causes in support of women. She was involved in the Sydney University Women's Association, the University Women's Society and the Women's Club, as well as the Womanhood Suffrage League of New South Wales, and the Women's Literary Society.

== Later life and legacy ==
Macdonald resigned from the university in early 1919. Soon after her retirement announcement, a memorial to her service to the university was planned with the Louisa May Memorial Hall being dedicated in 1924. Macdonald died in 1949 in London.
