= Bambi Northwood-Blyth =

Australian model (born 1991)

- Born: Stephanie Bambi Northwood-Blyth; 1991 (age 33–34); Melbourne, Australia
- Occupation: Model
- Agent: IMG Models
- Height: 1.70 m (5 ft 7 in)
- Spouse: Dan Single (2014-2017)

Stephanie Bambi Northwood-Blyth (born 1991) is an Australian model known for her eyebrows and blue eyes.

== Early life ==
Northwood-Blyth was born in Melbourne, Victoria and grew up learning the piano. Whilst her first name is Stephanie, her middle name of Bambi was adopted as a nickname.

Her moment of discovery occurred when she missed university orientation, and stumbled into a modeling agency by chance. She joined the agency and soon was given an exclusive by Balenciaga which took her overseas to participate in the fashion season. For six months, Northwood-Blyth modeled in test-shoots and showrooms, and walked international runways.

== Career ==
Northwood-Blyth's big break came when she walked in a Balenciaga show, her first-ever runway show, a major coup for a model standing at 5’7”. She has also walked for Karl Lagerfeld at Chanel. The relaunch of the Calvin Klein’s CK One fragrance saw Northwood-Blyth as the face of the campaign, photographed by Steven Meisel, it was Northwood-Blyth's first-ever advertising campaign.

Northwood-Blyth has worked with companies such as Armani, Hogan, Voodoo Hosiery, Topshop, H&M, Tommy Hilfiger, and Rihanna for River Island photographed by Mario Sorrenti. She has appeared on the covers of Vogue Japan, Elle Australia, Marie Claire Italy, V Magazine, P Magazine, Harper’s Bazaar Australia and Spain, Oyster, Issue, and French Revue des Modes. In addition to the aforementioned, select editorial features include Vogue Australia, CR Fashion Book, Russh, W, and i-D magazines amongst others.

For a period of time, Northwood-Blyth was a music presenter on the youth music show Channel V. Northwood-Blyth has starred in two short films.

Aje's Spring Summer 2019 collection featured Northwood-Blyth as the muse, with images taken in Queensland for the campaign.

In 2020, Northwood-Blyth co-designed a collection with Australian brand F+H Jewelry.

== Personal life ==
In 2012, Northwood-Blyth became engaged to Dan Single, the owner of fashion brand Ksubi. The couple married in January 2014 at the Beach Hotel in Byron Bay and divorced in 2017, one month after Single fell ‘feet first’ from a bedroom window at the Hotel Grand D’Amour apartment in Paris.

Living with Type 1 diabetes since she was 10-years-old, Northwood-Blyth is an outspoken advocate for afflicted-youth, demonstrating how to manage diabetes symptoms while simultaneously living to the fullest. Northwood-Blyth was installed on the Global Council for Beyond Type 1 and spends her time as an ambassador for philanthropic endeavors including the Juvenile Diabetes Research Foundation. Northwood-Blyth is also an ambassador for Meat Free Week, a charity that raises awareness for factory farming and animal cruelty, and actively involved with Australia's Reach Foundation, an organization dedicated to mentoring at-risk youth.

As of 2011, Northwood-Blyth had 3 tattoos and stated she wouldn't add any more.

In 2013, Northwood-Blyth launched B.BAM clothing in conjunction with General Pants Co. Northwood-Blyth and her ex-husband Dan Single launched a line of rosé called 'D&B Pour les Amour' in 2014. In 2016, the couple launched 'P.Jame', a range of silk pyjamas. A pajama party was hosted for the launch and was attended by supermodel Winnie Harlow.

Northwood-Blyth called New York home for five years from when she was 19. She currently lives between New York and Melbourne.

Currently Northwood-Blyth is completing a three-year degree in business, majoring in social entrepreneurship.

To stay in shape she does hot yoga, pilates and takes long walks.

== Filmography ==
Year	Title	Role	Notes
2015-2016	Channel V	Host	TV show
2017	An Accessory to Murder		Short Film
2019	The Moment I Miss her		Short Film
