= Iolanthe, Gordon =

Heritage listed building in New South Wales, Australia

Iolanthe
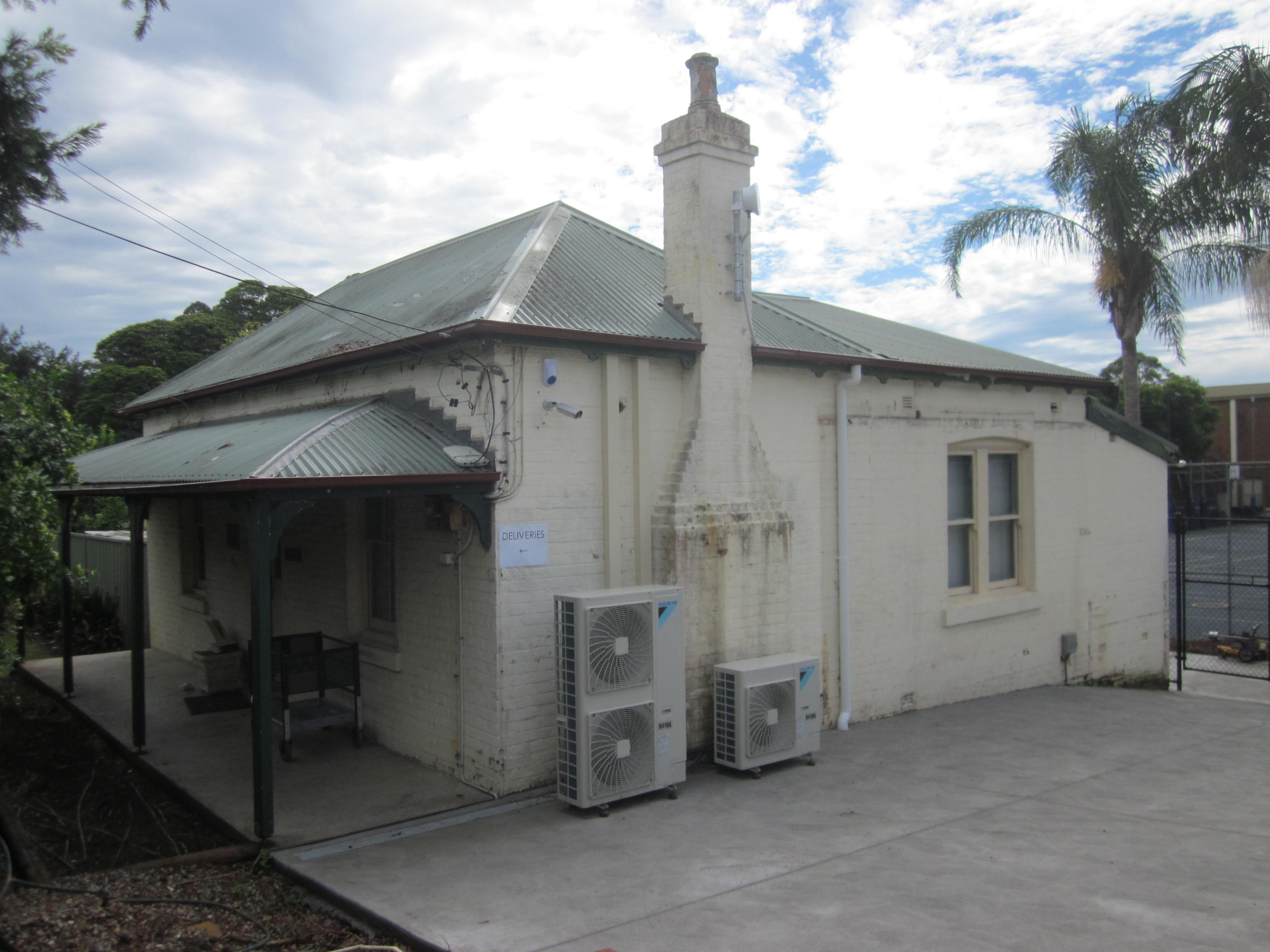
- Iolanthe, 691 Pacific Highway, Gordon, New South Wales
- Interactive map of Iolanthe
- 33°45′35″S 151°09′18″E
- Location: 691 Pacific Highway, Gordon, New South Wales, Australia

History
- Built: 1870

Site notes
- Owner: The Uniting Church in Australia

New South Wales Heritage Register
- Official name: Iolanthe; Gordon Post Office
- Type: State heritage (built)
- Designated: 2 April 1999
- Reference no.: 227
- Type: House
- Category: Residential buildings (private)

Iolanthe is a heritage-listed former residence and post office located at 691 Pacific Highway in Gordon, a suburb on the Upper North Shore region of Sydney, New South Wales, Australia. It was built in 1870. It is also known as Gordon Post Office. The property is owned by the Uniting Church in Australia and is within the perimeter fence of the Ravenswood School for Girls. It was added to the New South Wales State Heritage Register on 2 April 1999.

== History ==
In 1860 residents of Lane Cove, (present Gordon area), petitioned the Postal Department successfully for a local post office, Previously letters, papers etc. were carried from Sydney and later from St. Leonards, by residents travelling along the road.

The dwelling chosen was the cottage of Mrs Eliza Edwards (granddaughter of Robert Pymble).

The Edwards family has strong associations with the development of the North Shore. The grandfather, Robert Pymble was a pioneer of the North Shore and recipient of a grant of 240 hectares (600 acres) in 1823 in the area known as Pymble. He supplied timber to Sydney and was the pioneer orchardist of the area. he was instrumental in having the railway constructed to Old Hornsby (Pearce's Corner) and particularly in having a rail station established at what came to be called Killara. The name Killara was Edwards' choice.

Miss Eliza (who preferred Elizabeth) Edwards was appointed Post Mistress, with a salary A£12 per year. Her sureties were neighbours Robert and George MacIntosh, orchardists. The post office business was conducted in a bedroom at the rear of the cottage.

The mail came once a week, later on, twice, the mail carrier was first Michael Fagan, later Foley and Porter names were given. It was customary to leave Sydney at 7am and deliver mail at Gordon, camp there and the next day continue with the mail to Hornsby and Gosford, first by road and after 1890 by train. In 1879 the name of the Post Office name was changed to Gordon Post Office. Miss Edwards report in the 1880s says 'from Chatswood to Pearce's Corner (Wahroonga) people rode or walked or sent for their mail." In 1885 two brick rooms were added to the front of the original cottage and most probably the existing verandah structure giving the cottage its present appearance.

On 10 January 1890 Miss Edwards advised the General Post Office that she considered the best way to serve the interests of Upper Gordon would be to establish a "receiving office" at Mr Filley's store on the corner of Gordon and Irish Town Roads. Later a bag could be made up at Sydney or St. Leonards and left Pymble platform. In 1887 as the construction of the railway from St. Leonards to Pearce's Corner, Miss Edwards made an application to the General Post Office to include the sale of money orders in view of changes to come with the population increase, since they were situated near the approved site of Gordon Station.

In 1894 Miss Edwards' resigned because of ill-health. In the same year the Post Office was moved to the Gordon railway station.

Miss Edwards continued to live in the dwelling with her children until her death in 1902. The cottage continued to be occupied by Miss Edwards family until 1952.

Ravenswood School for Girls purchased the property between 1952 and 1955. In 1980 proposals to demolish the cottage for tennis courts were considered.

On 11 July 1980 an Interim Conservation Order was placed over the property. On 2 April 1999 it was transferred to the State Heritage Register.

== Description ==
Modest single story brick building with iron roof. Verandah at front and simple chamfered wood posts.

== Heritage listing ==
As at 9 August 2013, the cottage is one of the earliest dwellings in the district. As a post office from 1860 to 1894 it played an important part in the everyday lives of early settlers of the North Shore. The use of the cottage as a post office between 1860 and 1894 allocates its place in the historical geography of New South Wales. The cottage's is directly associated with the Pymble and Edwards families whose members were prominent pioneers in the development of the North Shore. Along the Pacific Highway between Pearce's Corner and North Sydney it is one of the very few remaining original dwellings which once lined the main road north.

Iolanthe was listed on the New South Wales State Heritage Register on 2 April 1999.

== See also ==
- Australian residential architectural styles
