= Dan Single =

Australian fashion designer

- Born: Sydney
- Occupation: Fashion designer
- Known for: Co-founder of Ksubi
- Spouse: Bambi Northwood-Blyth (2014–2017)
- Partner: Pip Edwards (2005–2008)
- Children: 1

Dan Single is an Australian fashion designer known for co-founding denim brand Ksubi.

== Early life ==
Single grew up on Sydney's Northern Beaches with one brother. He was a DJ and surfer throughout his youth.

== Career ==
In 1999, Single and his friends Gareth Moody and George Gorrow started the Australian fashion and denim brand Ksubi to make jeans with a good fit. Single met Gorrow in the late 1990s at a skateboard fair in Los Angeles and started the brand with a collection of jeans and T-shirts at Australian Fashion Week in 2000. The brand has evolved from just denim and has become a large part of international street culture releasing collaborations with artists such as Kanye West, Dim Mak and Tiga.

Late in 2005, Gorrow and Single split with Ksubi co-founder Gareth Moody. As of December 2005, Single and Gorrow owned stakes of 53 per cent and 36 per cent respectively in the company. They signed a long-term deal with Australian high-street brand Jeanswest for a new, cheaper range of designer jeans called 'Alba Fan Club'.

In 2014 the brand went through a crisis when their stores, both physical and online, were closed after previously going into administration in 2009. The brand bounced back quickly when US-based firm Breakwater Management Group took it on and focused on the brand's online sales. Breakwater then made a distribution agreement with Australian multi-brand retailer General Pants Co in 2014, to sell Ksubi items from its Australian stores.

Single works with the indigenous mentoring organisation, AIME. In 2019, both Single and AIME founder Jack Manning Bancroft were reading the book Let My People Go Surfing by Yvon Chouinard and it inspired them both to come up with the concept of "No New Clothes". A capsule clothing collection, the line used dead-stock fabric from Australian brands including M.J. Bale, AS Colour and McTavish, and was reworked by artists, fashion designers and the kids in the AIME program to raise funds for the organisation's work.

In May 2025, Single released a book, The Diary of a Naughtie Kid.

== Personal life ==
In 2006, Single's son was born to ex-partner, P.E. Nation founder, Pip Edwards.

In 2012, Single became engaged to model Bambi Northwood-Blyth. The couple married in January 2014 at the Beach Hotel in Byron Bay and divorced in 2017, one month after Single's fall in Paris.

Single and Northwood-Blyth launched a line of rosé called 'D&B Pour les Amour' in 2014 and a range of silk pyjamas called 'P.Jame'.

In March 2017, Single and then wife Northwood-Blyth were on holiday in Paris when he fell 35 meters feet-first from a balcony at the Grand Hotel Amour. He shattered every bone from his feet to his hips and pelvis and was in a coma for two weeks while he underwent eight operations. Controversially, Single started a GoFundMe page asking the public to contribute $250,000 to his recovery. This request was met by disdain and labelled a "pathetic disgrace" by the media and the public.
