= Gordon Public School =

School of government

Gordon Public School (former)
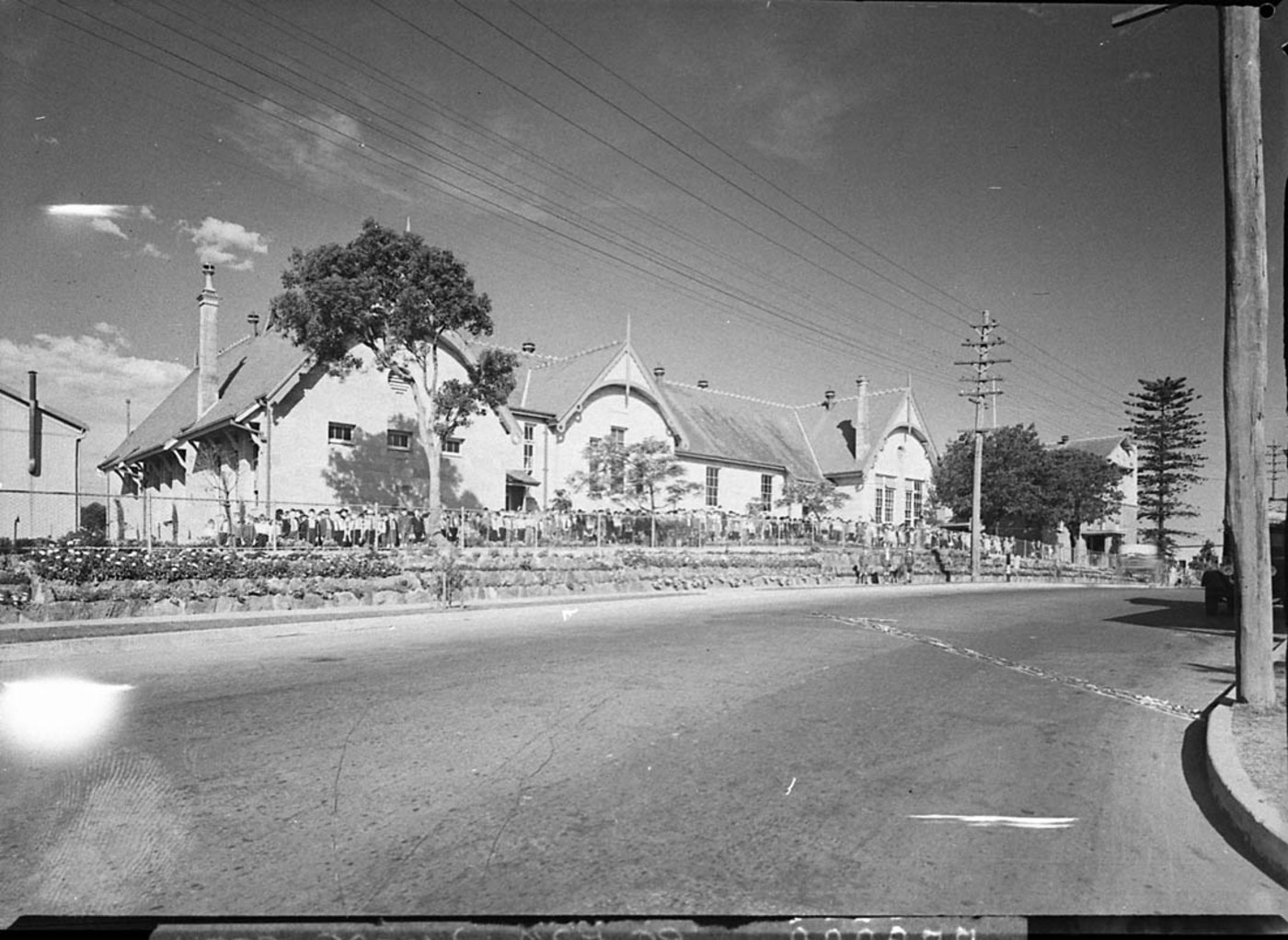
- Gordon Public School, pictured in 1937

- Location within Sydney Location within Australia
- 33°45′13″S 151°09′08″E
- Location: 799 Pacific Highway, Gordon, Ku-ring-gai Council, New South Wales, Australia

History
- Built: 1871
- Built for: NSW Instruction Department

Site notes
- Owner: Ku-ring-gai Council

New South Wales Heritage Register
- Official name: Gordon Public School; Former Gordon Public School
- Type: State heritage (built)
- Designated: 2 April 1999
- Reference no.: 757
- Type: School – State (public)
- Category: Education

The Gordon Public School is a heritage-listed former public school located at 799 Pacific Highway, Gordon, New South Wales, a suburb of Sydney, Australia. The school was opened in 1871 and closed in 1989. The property was transferred to community use and is owned by Ku-ring-gai Council. It was added to the New South Wales State Heritage Register on 2 April 1999.

Government primary schools at Gordon East and the Gordon West Public School, located in West Pymble, have replaced the Gordon Public School.

== History ==
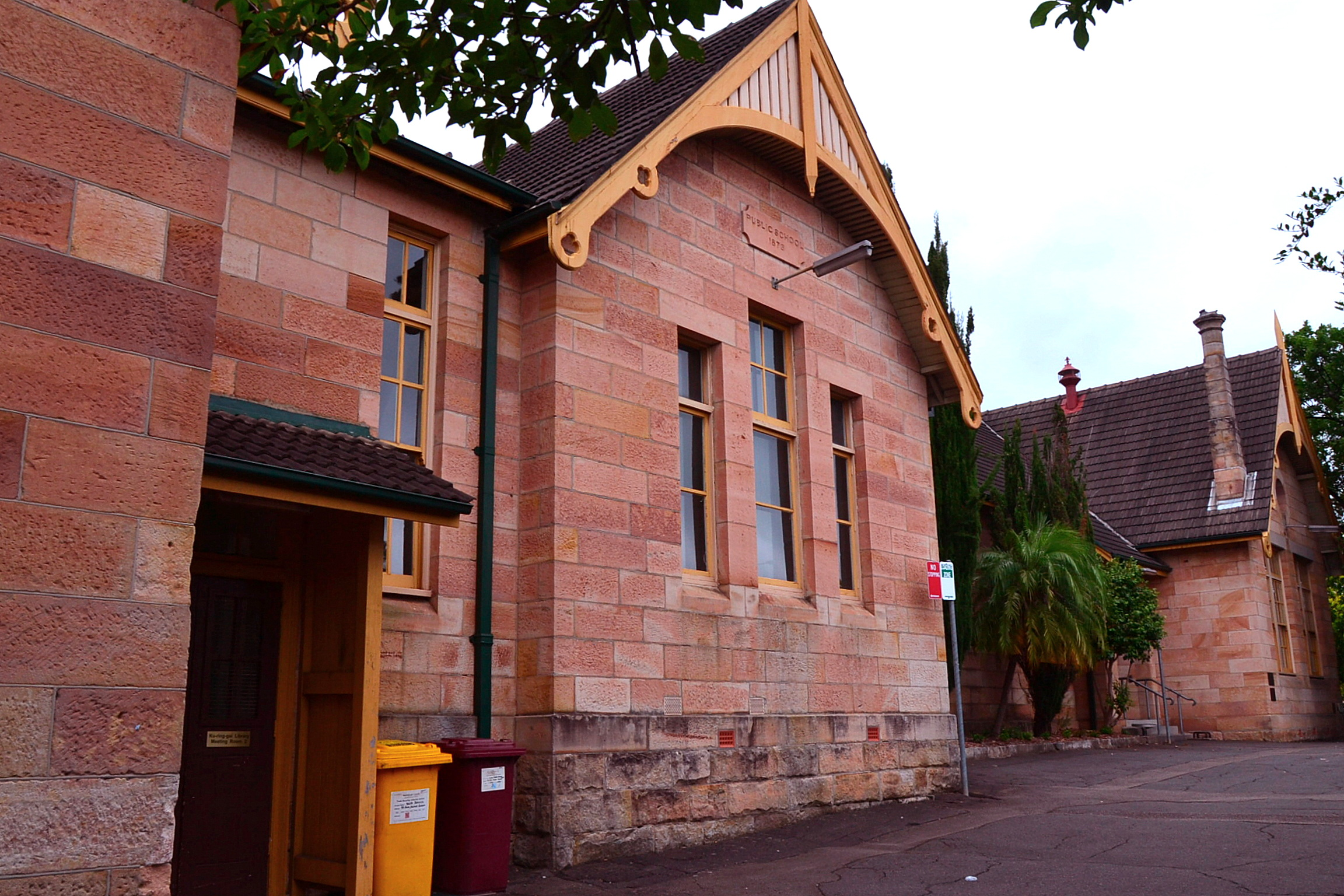
Gordon Public School in 2012

Between 1871 and 1885 the school was known as the Lane Cove School. The denominational Wesleyan School at Lane Cove was in 1871 converted into a public school. The enrolment was then 54 children.

This school continued to be held in the old Wesleyan chapel until 1877. In March 1876, a site fronting Lane Cove Road (now known as Pacific Highway) was acquired at a cost of A£30, but portion of this ground was subsequently resumed by the Railway Department in 1888: but the Instruction Department secured an additional area for £318, and a further area was conveyed in 1891. The name of the school was in 1885 changed from Lane Cove School to Gordon Public School. In 1877 a tender for new school buildings and residence was accepted for the sum of £1,957, which were completed and opened in August of that year. At the official opening of a new wing at the school by the Minister of Public Instruction, The Hon. Jacob Garrard MP, in 1897 it was reported that the school afforded accommodation for 98 pupils. In 1888 further additions were made at a cost of £207. The rooms just opened measured 10.5 metres (34.5 ft) by 7.3 metres (24 ft), and is constructed of stone, and covered with slates, so as to match the old building. It is of modern design, giving plenty of light and ventilation and 3.5 cubic metres (124 ft^{3}) for each child. It gave accommodation for 100 pupils. With the old building there was accommodation for 220 children. The enrolment of the school for March 1897 was 205, with an average attendance of 143. The total cost of land and buildings amounted to £3,351.

=== Notable alumni ===
- Lewis Yelland Andrews, soldier and colonial official.
- Bill Bradfield, civil and aviation engineer.
- Philip Cox AO, architect
- Harold Farncomb, RAN officer and admiral.
- Raymond Kershaw, army officer, banker and diplomat.
- Sir Marcus Loane, Anglican archbishop of Sydney.
- Arthur Wheen, soldier, translator and librarian.

== Heritage listing ==
Gordon Public School was listed on the New South Wales State Heritage Register on 2 April 1999.

== See also ==
- Australian non-residential architectural styles
