= Grace Cuthbert-Browne =

Australian medical doctor (1900–1988)

Grace Cuthbert Browne MBE
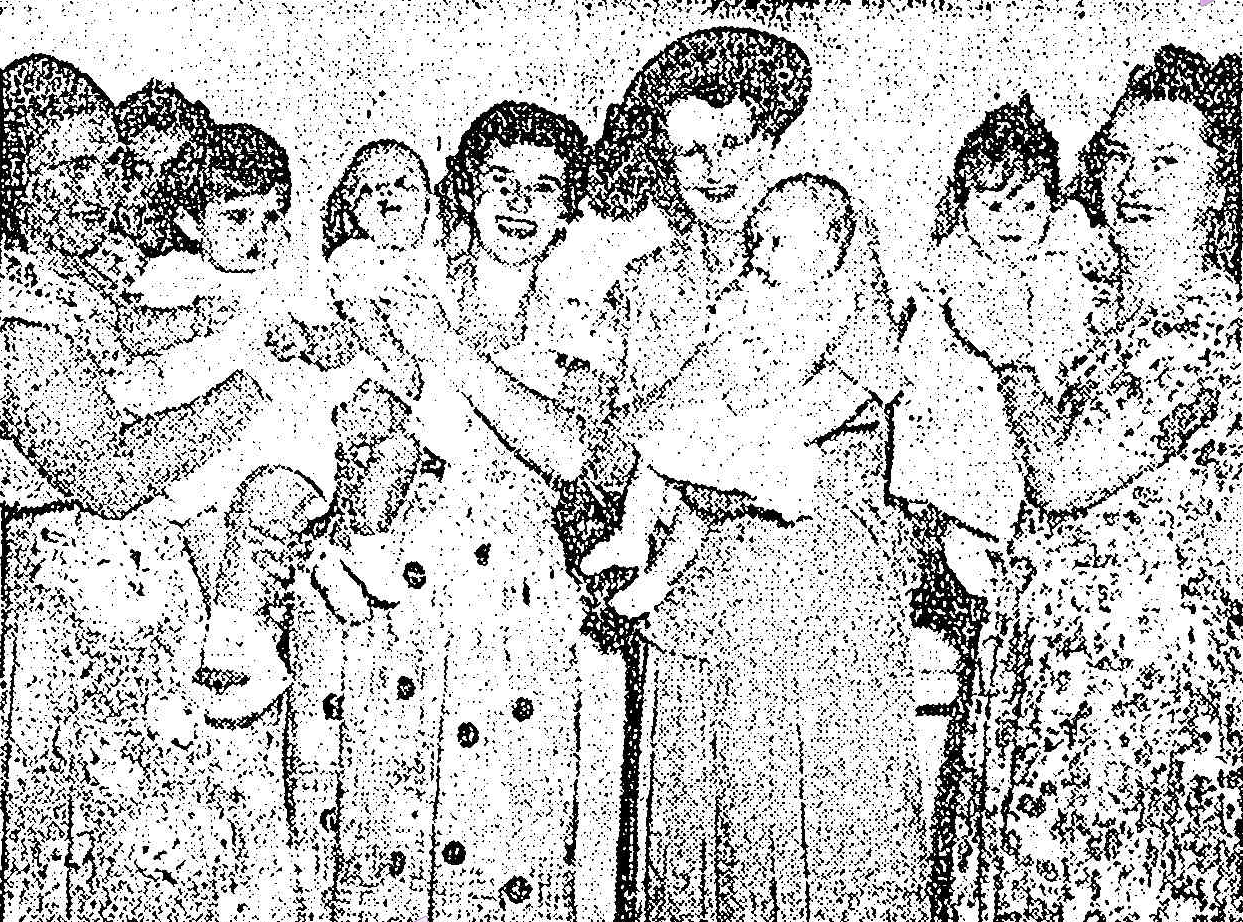
- Cuthbert-Browne (second adult from the right) opening a baby health centre
- Born: 2 January 1900; Port Glasgow, Scotland
- Died: 17 December 1988 (aged 88); St Leonards, New South Wales, Australia
- Education: University of Sydney
- Scientific career
- Fields: Medical Practitioner
- Workplaces: New South Wales Department of Public Health

Grace Cuthbert-Browne MBE (2 January 1900 – 17 December 1988) was an Australian medical doctor instrumental in improving the health of mothers and babies, and the consequent reduction in maternal and infant deaths in Australia. She was Director of Maternal and Baby Welfare in the New South Wales Department of Public Health from 1937 to 1964; during this time the infant fatality rate decreased form 40 to 20 per thousand live births.

== Early life and education ==
Grace Johnston Cuthbert was born in Port Glasgow, Scotland, 2 January 1900. She was the youngest of five children. Her mother, Mary. later became involved in a variety humanitarian and medical charities. Her father was a merchant sailor who captained ships from New Zealand to England carrying frozen mutton. In 1901, he was appointed as "chief marine surveyor" for a group of insurance companies in Sydney. This resulted in Browne, at age one, and the family, including three older brothers (an older sister had died of whooping cough) moving to Sydney where they settled in Kirribilli. When Browne, was six the family moved to Lindfield and she attended school first at Lindfield College and then at Ravenswood in the Sydney suburb of Gordon. Cuthbert enjoyed golf, tennis and surfing, and continued these activities well into her adult life.

Cuthbert enrolled in the University of Sydney in 1918, receiving an allowance to study in the faculty of medicine. She earned a Bachelor of Medicine in 1924.

== Career ==
Subsequent to earning her degree, she worked at Royal North Shore hospital. In 1925 she purchased a general practice at Pambula where she was renowned for her dedication and service to the small rural communities.

In 1929, she returned to the Sydney suburb of Wollstonecraft to continue in general practice. Her experience in Pambula, Eden (1926-1929) and Wollstonecraft led to her interest in antenatal and neonatal care. During this time she was honorary medical officer to the Tresillian Mothercraft training school, the Lane Cove health centre, and the Rachel Forster hospital.

Cuthbert succeeded Doctor Elma Morgan as the Director of Infant and Maternal Welfare on 1 August 1937, a role she held until 1964. Part of this role included supervision of 200 local Baby Health Centres, as well as the pre-natal clinics at metropolitan hospitals. Between 1946 and 1964, she also lectured part-time in maternal and child health at the University of Sydney's School of Public Health and Tropical Medicine. Mortality of mothers went from 5 in 1000 live births to .32 during her tenure as Director of Maternal and Baby welfare. She was protective of her position in maternal health and rejected perceived interference.

She served on a committee creating a curriculum for young women. It was implemented in a number of independent schools. Cuthbert-Browne was the honorary medical director of the Grovesnor Hospital from her retirement until 1970.

== Personal life ==
On 15 February 1951, Cuthbert married Emeritus Professor Francis James Browne, a 71-year-old obstetrician and gynaecologist. The wedding was held at Crown Court National Church of Scotland, Covent Garden. Their happy marriage lasted until his death in 1963.

Cuthbert resided at Northaven Retirement village in Turramurra and died there 17 December 1988.

== Awards and honours ==
- MBE – 1959
- Fellow of the Royal College of Obstetricians and Gynaecologists
- Fellow of the Royal Australian College
- Fellow of the Australian Medical Association - 1972
- Honorary Doctor of Medicine – 1986

== Selected works ==
- Cuthbert-Browne, Grace J (1952). "Report of studies and observations made during tenure of a World Health Organisation fellowship, 1950-1951". Department of Health, Division of Maternal and Baby Welfare.
- Cuthbert-Browne, Grace Johnston, 1900- (1978). "Grace Johnston Cuthbert-Browne (Autobiography)". Women Physicians of the World: Autobiographies of Medical Pioneers (1978). Hemisphere Publishing Corporation: 187–191.
