= Pip Edwards =

Australian fashion designer

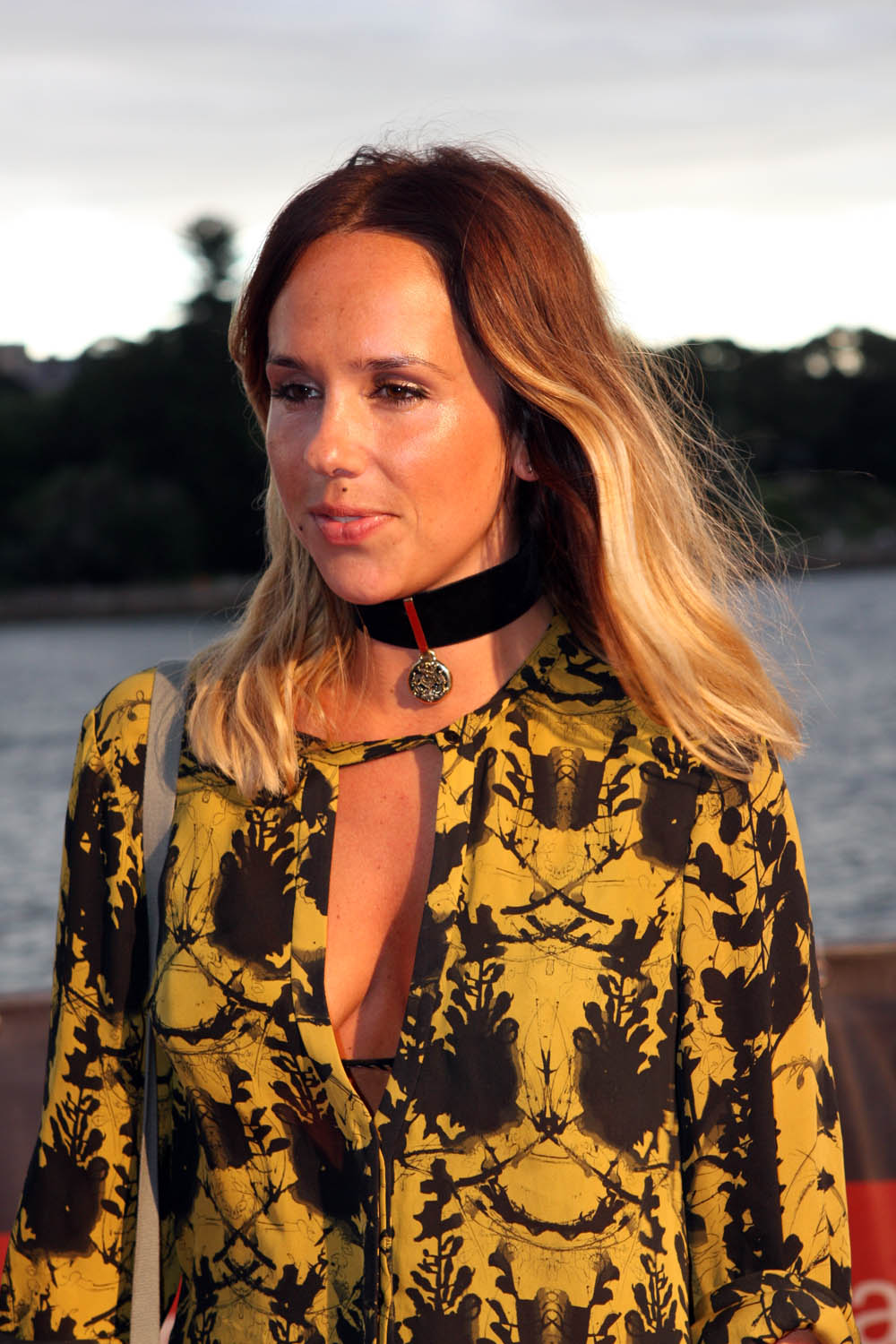
- Pip Edwards in 2012
- Born: 26 April 1980 (age 46)
- Education: University of Sydney
- Occupations: Fashion designer; Creative director
- Partner: Dan Single (m. 2005–2008)
- Children: 1

Pip Edwards (born 1980) is an Australian fashion designer and creative director. She is creative director of Ksubi. She co-founded the sportswear label P.E Nation and was a designer at Ksubi, Sass & Bide and General Pants Co. earlier in her career.

== Early life ==
Edwards was the music captain at Ravenswood School for Girls and grew up playing piano and singing. As a child, Edwards edited clothes, created bracelets and sewed ribbons onto singlets to display her fashion flair. Edwards took a Commerce and Law degree at the University of Sydney.

== Career ==
Edwards started her career working for three years in the global risk division at Pricewaterhouse Coopers before entering the fashion industry with her first role at Ksubi. She started as PR manager and then transitioned into the womenswear design team. Following that she worked for five years as Senior Creative and Accessories Designer for Sass & Bide where she met her business partner, Claire Tregoning. Edwards moved on to General Pants Co. where she served as Design Director.

In 2016, Edwards created her activewear brand, P.E. Nation with Tregoning. The brand focuses on a high fashion approach to activewear, leaning heavily on 1990s streetwear aesthetics, function and luxury. Edwards and the brand strive to make their products as sustainable as possible and ensure all suppliers are certified. Edwards stepped down from her position as creative director of P.E. Nation in August 2024.

In September 2024, Edwards returned to Ksubi as creative director.

In 2025, Edwards designed a swimwear collection for Bond-Eye.

== Personal life ==
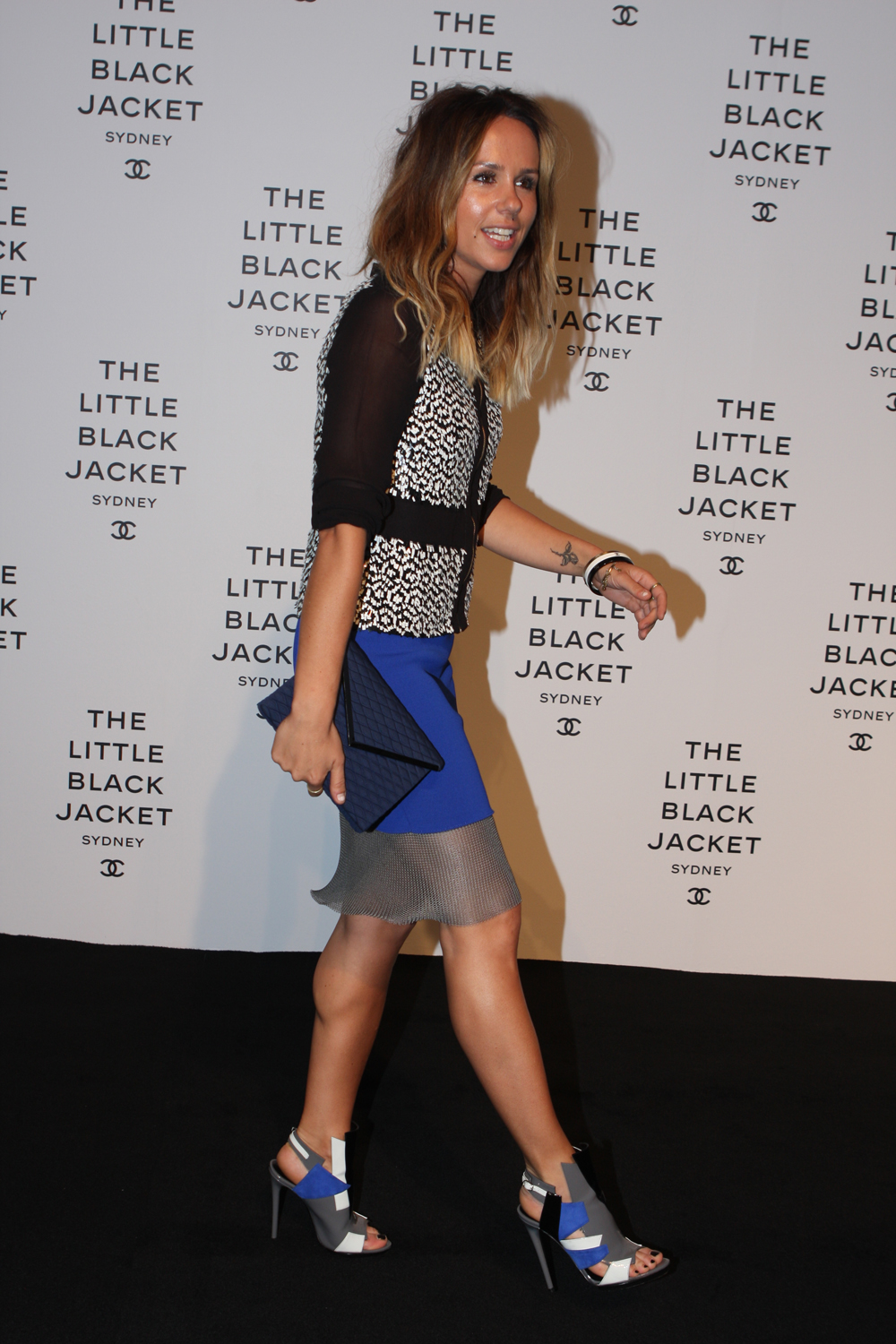
Edwards in 2012

Edwards is the mother to one son who was born in 2006 with ex-husband, Ksubi fashion designer Dan Single.

In 2020, Edwards dated retired Australian cricket captain Michael Clarke, but their relationship ended in early 2021. She dated retired NRL player and Fox Sports presenter Braith Anasta briefly in 2023.

Edwards lives in Sydney. In December 2025, Edwards was present during the Bondi Beach shooting. She and a friend hid under a van for safety.
