= Winifred Marion Petrie =

Australian nurse and hospital proprietor (1890–1966)

- Born: 21 November 1890; Randwick, New South Wales
- Died: 6 May 1966 (aged 75); Deakin

Winifred Marion Petrie (21 November 1890 – 6 May 1966) was an Australian nurse and hospital proprietor. She opened a private hospital in Canberra in 1936.

== Life ==
Petrie was born in the Sydney suburb of Randwick in 1890. Her parents were Marion (born Hescott) and Fitt Charles Petrie and they had both been born in Queensland. Her father was a solicitor. She was educated in Sydney at Ravenswood School for Girls. She joined the Australasian Trained Nurses' Association in 1922 after training in Sydney at what was then called the Coast Hospital and it is now Prince Henry Hospital. In 1923 she qualified in obstetrics at the Royal Hospital for Women.

In 1928 she was working as a sister-in-charge at Canberra Hospital when she joined a protest that ended with a matron resigning. Petrie and three of her peers handed in their notice. The resulting enquiry found that the nurses had been treated poorly and the responsible matron left the hospital.

She worked at Auberne Private Hospital, Queanbeyan, in New South Wales. The Lying-in hospital had been opened in 1910 by a nurse Mary Johnston and it was one of several in the street.

In September 1935, she decided to lease a plot of land in Canberra and while she completed further training in mothercraft the builders worked. In 1936 the purpose built 12-bed Allawah Private Hospital opened and the first patients were expected in May. The hospital's design was unusual because there were no difficult corners for wheelchairs to turn. Her experience and the skill of Ken Oliphant had achieved this design which included an operating theatre and separate quarters for the nurses. Within four years the mortgage was paid and the hospital's reputation brought in patients who included the author Dame Alexandra Hasluck, the Prime Minister John Curtin, Prince William of Gloucester and his father the Duke of Gloucester. It was Canberra's only private hospital.

Petrie's health and competition closed the hospital in 1948. She died in the Canberra suburb of Deakin in 1966. The hospital building that she had commissioned is recognised as architecturally important.
