= Ravenswood School for Girls =

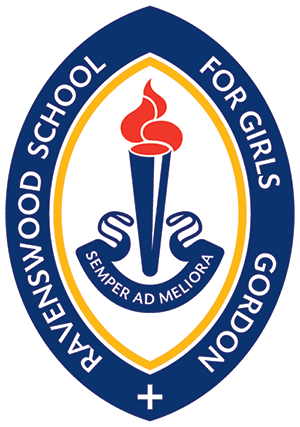

Location
- 10 Henry Street; Gordon, New South Wales, 2072; Australia; 33°45′33″S 151°9′20″E

Information
- Type: Independent, day and boarding
- Motto: Latin: Semper ad meliora (Always towards better things)
- Denomination: Uniting Church
- Established: 1901
- Founder: Mabel Fidler
- Chair: Peter Roach
- Principal: Sue Floro
- Employees: ~301
- Gender: Girls
- Enrolment: ~1476 (Prep to Year 12)
- Colours: Navy blue, gold and red
- Slogan: Igniting Potential, Inspiring Passion & Purpose
- Website: www.ravenswood.nsw.edu.au

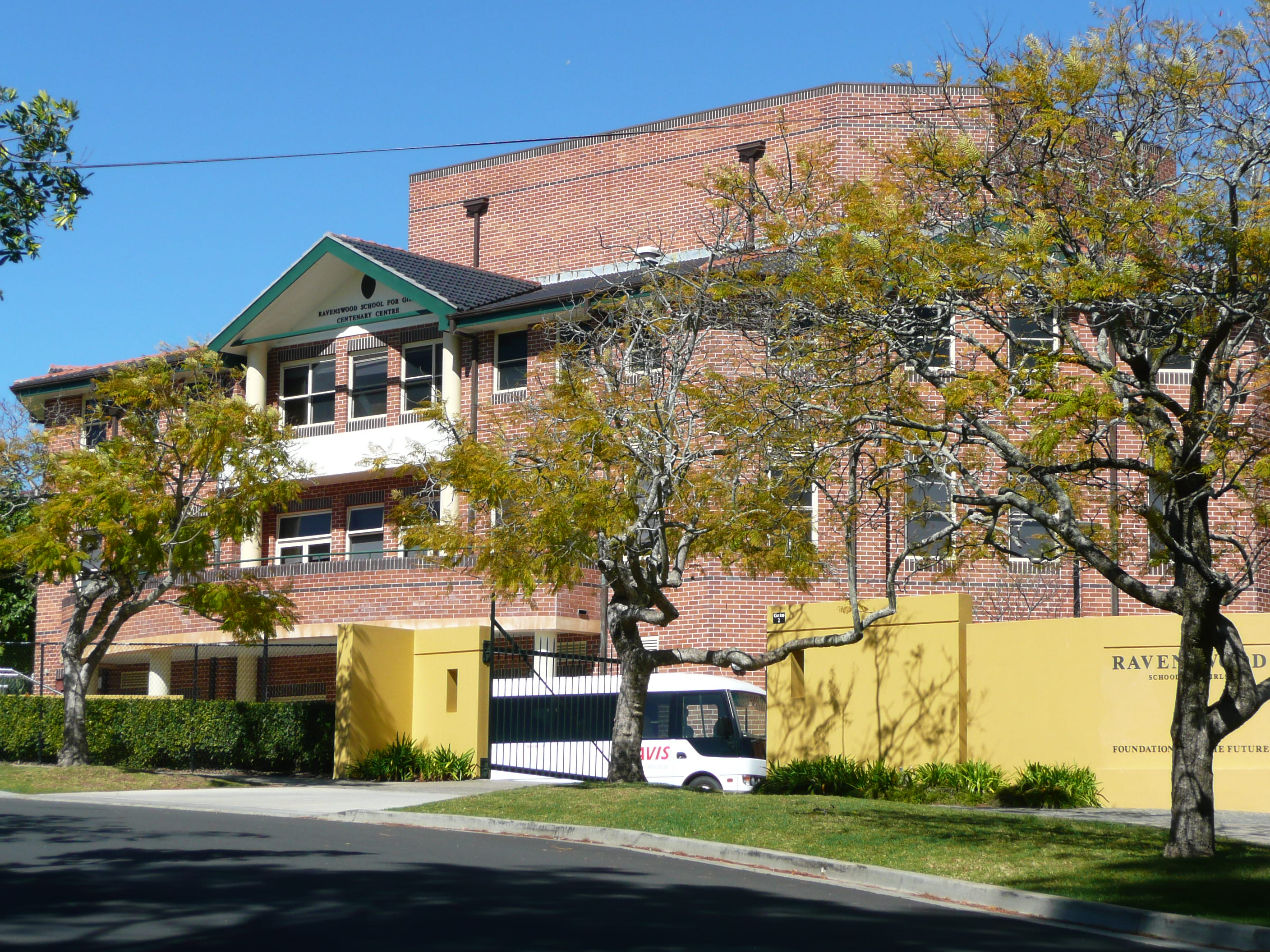
Ravenswood

Ravenswood School for Girls (often referred to as Ravenswood or Ravo) is an independent, Uniting Church, day and boarding school for Prep to Year 12 girls, situated in Gordon, an Upper North Shore suburb of Sydney, New South Wales, Australia.

Established in 1901 by Mabel Fidler (1871–1960), Ravenswood currently caters for over 1400 students from Prep to Year 12, including 50 boarders from Years 7 to 12. The school has been an IB World School since June 2004, and is authorised to offer the IB Diploma Programme.

Ravenswood is affiliated with the Association of Heads of Independent Schools of Australia (AHISA), the Independent Primary School Heads of Australia (IPSHA), the Australian Boarding Schools' Association, the Alliance of Girls' Schools Australasia, and is a member of the Association of Heads of Independent Girls' Schools (AHIGS).

== Awards ==
Ravenswood has been named one of Australia’s most innovative schools for the sixth time in seven years by The Educator. Ravenswood was named on The Educator 5-start Innovative Schools list in 2018, 2019, 2020, 2022, 2023 and 2024 for its work in the areas of Positive Education and STEM.

Ravenswood won the Best Use of Technology award at the 2024 Australian Education Awards and was awarded an Excellence Award for Primary School Teacher of the Year in 2022. Ravenswood also won Excellence Awards at the 2022, 2024 and 2025 Australian Education Awards for Boarding School of the Year, and an Excellence Award for Best Professional Learning Program in 2025. The School achieved its fourth Excellence Award for Best Student Wellbeing Program in five years (also in 2021, 2022, 2024 and 2025).

== History ==
Ravenswood was established with eight students on 28 January 1901 by the first Headmistress, Mabel Fidler, as a non-sectarian private day school for girls, with preparatory classes for boys. The first classes took place in a schoolroom erected on the block adjacent to Fidler's home, "Ravenswood", in Henry Street, Gordon. The school remains on this site.

Fidler retired from Ravenswood in 1925, a year after the school was purchased by the Methodist Ladies' College, Burwood, thus becoming a school of the Methodist Church. Subsequently, the school name was changed to Ravenswood Methodist Ladies' College. At this time, Ravenswood was the largest non-residential, private secondary school in Sydney, with an enrolment of 180, and was highly regarded for the quality of its teaching and its achievements in sport. Ravenswood became a day and boarding school in 1935, with the enrolment of the first two boarders.

The 1960s saw the introduction of the school anthem, Kindle the Flame and a fourth school House, all houses being named by the students after Royal Houses of Britain: Stuart, Tudor, Windsor and York. In 1977, as the Methodist, Presbyterian and Congregational churches came together to form the Uniting Church, the school name changed to the current Ravenswood School for Girls. The royal blue and gold uniform was also introduced at this time.

In 2015, the head girl of the school used her end-of-term speech to accuse the school of peddling an "unrealistic image of perfection", and providing some students with more opportunities than others because "schools are being run more and more like businesses, where everything becomes financially motivated, where more value is placed on those who provide good publicity or financial benefits." She claimed that the school had attempted to censor her speech by requiring prior copies.

The school has historically maintained an end of year graduation tradition where year 12 students release three white birds to signify "freedom" and "letting go". In 2024, animal welfare concerns were raised regarding this tradition, with animal rights activists claiming the move increases their "risk of death from starvation, dehydration or predation". The provider of the birds stated that they are white racing pigeons with a "99 per cent" return rate.

== Campus ==
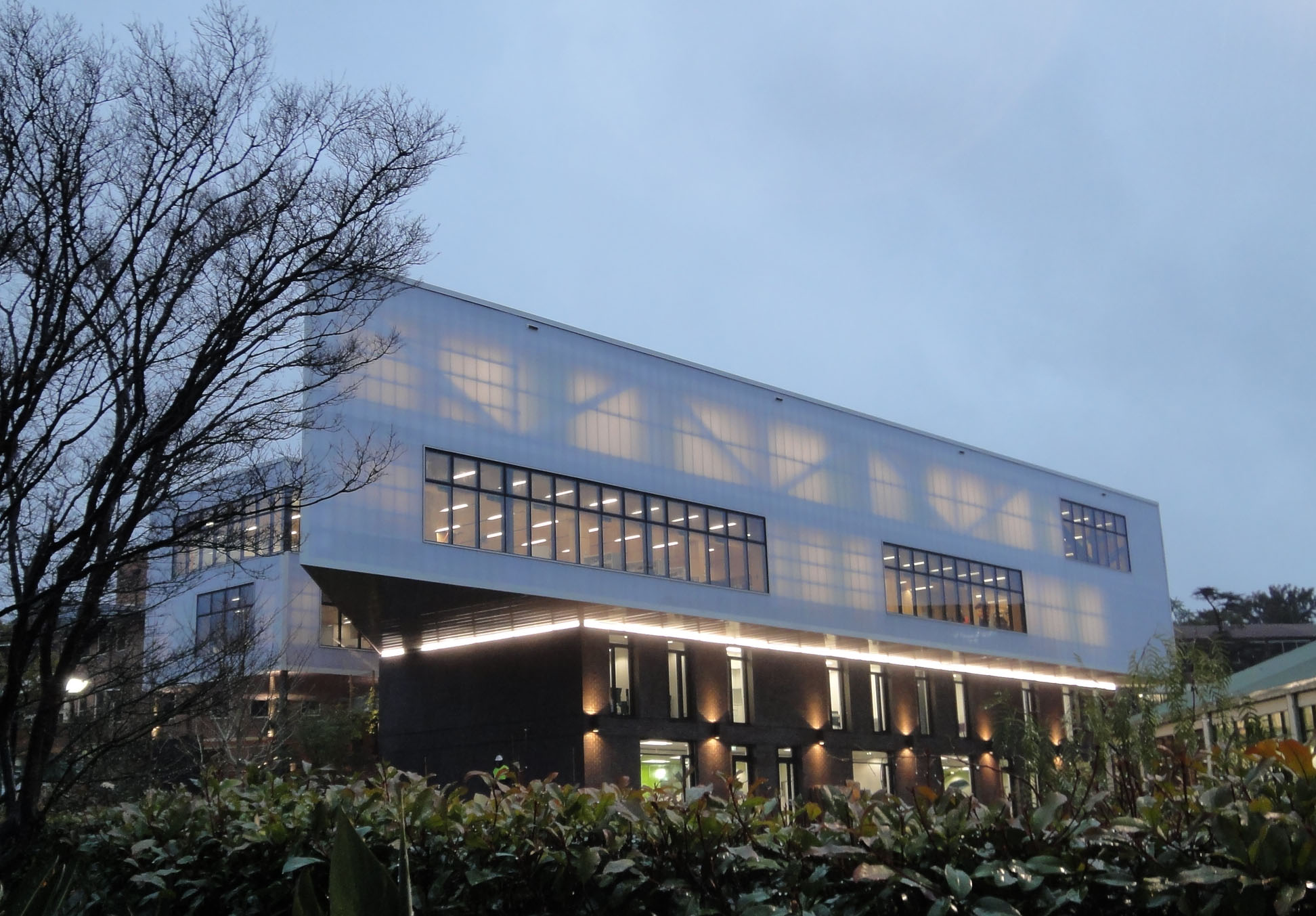
Mabel Fidler Building, Ravenswood School for Girls by BVN Architecture

Ravenswood is located on its original site, a single campus in suburban Gordon. The school has progressively expanded since 1901, with the acquisition of new properties and the upgrading of facilities.

The school grounds feature quadrangles and courtyards, a multi-purpose complex with heated swimming pool, gymnasium, a "Strength and Conditioning centre" and an Athletics Field. The Ravenswood Centenary Centre includes a Performing Arts theatre, music centre and exhibition areas. Junior School students are catered for within the Junior School centre with a Resource Centre, playground and play equipment area, adventure playground and Assembly Hall.

The Senior Learning Centre opened to students in 2020 and officially opened in 2021, designed by BVN Architecture.

== Curriculum ==
In Years 11 and 12, students may choose to take either the Higher School Certificate (HSC) course or the International Baccalaureate Diploma Course (IB).

== Co-curriculum ==
=== Debating ===
Ravenswood has a tradition of debating, and students are offered opportunities to participate at competitive or social levels. Ravenswood competes in three inter-school debating competitions: the Independent Schools Debating Association (ISDA), the Archdale Debating Competition and the Independent Primary School Heads of Australia (IPSHA). Girls may also participate in House debating.

=== Sport ===
Primary School students may partake in competitive sport through the Ravenswood's membership of the Independent Primary Schools Association of Australia (IPSHA). These competitions are usually held on Saturday mornings and include sports such as: Softball, Tennis, Netball, Cricket, Hockey, and Soccer. Secondary School students compete against 28 other similar type schools in the Independent Girls' Schools Sporting Association (IGSSA) competition. These competitions occur on Saturday mornings or in the form of carnivals and include sports such as: Softball, Swimming, Diving, Cricket, Tennis, Hockey, Soccer and Gymnastics. Students who perform well at IPSHA or IGSSA level may be invited to compete in NSW Combined Independent Schools' (CIS) competitions.

=== STEM ===
Both Junior School and Senior School students have access to a range of STEM resources and learning platforms including 3D printers, Podcast Studio, VR headsets and Robotics.

Ravenswood has been named a 5-Star Innovative School for six of the last seven years (2018, 2019, 2020, 2022, 2023 and 2024) by The Educator for work in the areas of Positive Education and STEM.

=== House System ===
There are four houses at Ravenswood: Stuart and Tudor were both established in 1930, followed by Windsor in 1944 and York in 1967.

House System
House	Colour
Stuart	Red
Tudor	Purple
Windsor	Green
York	Blue

== Community ==
It has been nominated for an "Employer of Choice for Women" classification by the Equal Opportunity for Women in the Workplace Agency (EOWA).

== Ravenswood Australian Women’s Art Prize ==
The Ravenswood Australian Women’s Art Prize is an initiative led by Ravenswood School for Girls, which aims to address the paucity of art prizes available for female artists in Australia. It has been run since 2017. It is an acquisitive prize, as of 2023 offering the following prizes:

- Professional Artist Prize – $35,000
- Emerging Artist Prize – $7,500 (supported by the Reed Family Foundation)
- Indigenous Emerging Artist Prize – $7,500 (supported by the Guardian and Scarborough Foundation)
- People’s Choice Award – $2,000 (non-acquisitive, plus an art pack valued at $500)
- Highly Commended Awards (total of 6 – two for each category) – $1,000 (supported by Lindfield Community Bank)

=== Winners ===
Professional artist prize

- 2017: Joan Ross
- 2018: Angela Tiatia
- 2019: Joanna Braithwaite
- 2020: Vicki Cullinan
- 2021: Caroline Rothwell
- 2022: Lara Merrett
- 2023: Maria Fernanda Cardoso
- 2024: Gaypalani Wanambi
- 2025: Janet Laurence

== Principals ==
Period	Details
1901–1925	Mabel Fidler, Founder
1926	Ethelwyn Potts
1927–1928	Clarice Ashworth
1928–1931	Francis Craig
1932–1961	Kathleen Crago
1962–1986	Phyllis Evans
1987–1992	Coral Dixon
1993–2004	Lorraine Smith
2005–2015	Vicki Steer
2016–2025	Anne Johnstone
2025	Sarah Guy (Acting)
Present	Suzanne Floro

== Notable alumnae ==
Media, entertainment and the arts

- Julia Baird – journalist, author and host of The Drum
- Pip Edwards (1997) – Co-Founder and Fashion Designer of P.E Nation, Creative Director of Fashion label Ksubi.
- Ros Bower (1923–1980) – TV producer and inspiration for the Ros Bower award for community arts.
- Gretel Killeen – author and host of Big Brother
- Tammin Sursok – Dani from Home and Away and Jenna from Pretty Little Liars
- Whitney Duan – multiple Archibald Prize finalist artist
- Rachel Merton – Liberal Member, Legislative Council NSW Parliament

Medicine and science

- Grace Cuthbert-Browne – MBE – doctor and Director of Maternal and Baby Welfare in the New South Wales Department of Public Health from 1937 to 1964
- Winifred Marion Petrie (1890–1966) – nurse and hospital founder

Politics, public service and the law

- Juanita Nielsen – publisher, anti-development campaigner, heiress to the Mark Foy's retail fortune. Disappeared in mysterious circumstances (believed kidnapped and murdered) from Kings Cross, in 1975. Subject of films, Heatwave (1982) and The Killing of Angel Street (1981)
- Catherine West – Labour Party politician
- Jillian Broadbent – economist, company director, director of Sydney Dance Company

Sport

- Tiffany Thomas Kane – world record holding Paralympian
- Kate McLoughlin (1996) – Australian Team Chef de Mission and General Manager of Sport for Paralympics Australia

== See also ==
- List of non-government schools in New South Wales
- List of boarding schools
