= Ros Bower =

(1923–1980) community arts director

- Born: Helen Rosalie Stephenson; 28 January 1923; Coonabarabran
- Died: 19 May 1980 (aged 57); South Yarra
- Other name: Rosalie Stephenson
- Education: Ravenswood Methodist Ladies' College, University of Sydney
- Occupation: Television producer
- Known for: community arts
- Spouse(s): Wallace Frederick Warne (1946–1956); Herbert Michael Bower (1956–her death)

Helen Rosalie Bower known as Ros Bower and (Helen) Rosalie Stephenson (28 January 1923 – 19 May 1980) was an Australian writer and television producer. She was the inaugural director of the Community Arts Board and helped establish the Australian Council for the Arts. The Ros Bower Award for Community arts and cultural development was named in her honour.

== Life ==
Bower was born in 1923 in the town of Coonabarabran in New South Wales. Her English-born parents were Minnie (born Tidswell) and Edward Lionel Stephenson. She was taught on the family farm until she went to school at Ravenswood Methodist Ladies' College. From there she went on to work as a reporter while also studying to graduate from the University of Sydney.

In 1956 her first decade long marriage ended and she married Herbert Michael Bower who was a physician. In the following year she began working as a Television producer. She produced the Australia version of the panel show Tell the Truth for HSV-7. She was also paid for writing scripts. She continued to produce shows until 1968.

In 1969 she helped establish the Australian Council for the Arts and in 1970 she published her book "Women in Australian Society" which she chose to publish under her original name of Rosalie Stephenson.

In May 1978, Bower was the inaugural director of the community arts board. Under her leadership the board was known for empowering people who had little social capital including migrants and aboriginals.

== Death and legacy ==
Bower died in South Yarra in 1980 from cancer. Two sons survived her. The Ros Bower Award was created to recognise contributions to Australian "Community arts and cultural development" and first awarded in 1981 to Domenic Mico. The 2023 Ros Bower award was won by Jacinta Mooney for her work improving community and cultural development in the Northern Territory.
