= Gordon, New South Wales =

Gordon
- Suburb
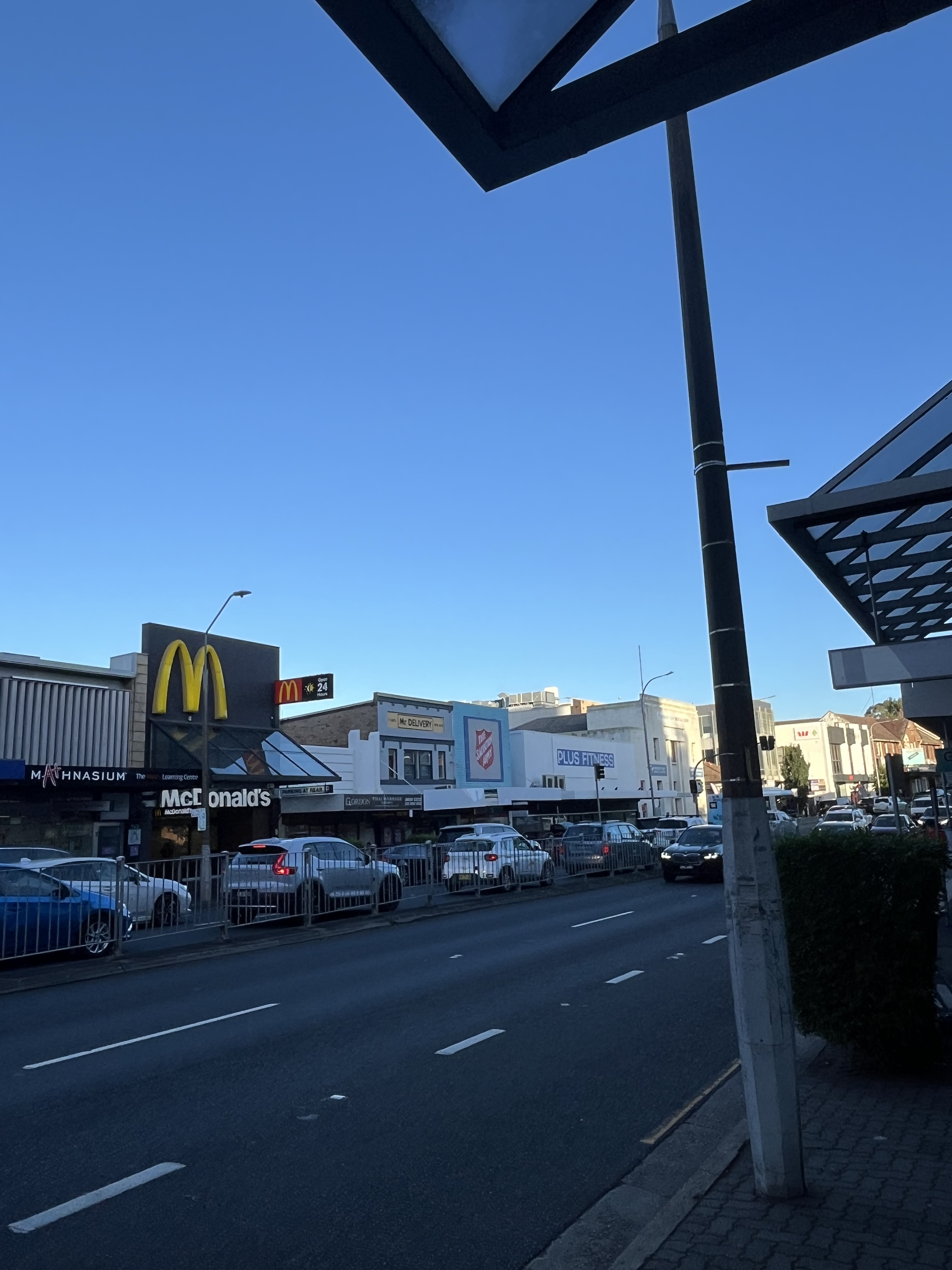
- Pacific Highway

- Interactive map of Gordon
- Country: Australia
- State: New South Wales
- City: Sydney
- LGA: Ku-ring-gai Council
- Location: 14 km (8.7 mi) north-west of Sydney CBD
- Established: 1823

Government
  - State electorate: Davidson
  - Federal division: Bradfield

Area
  - Total: 3.79 km^{2} (1.46 sq mi)
- Elevation: 126 m (413 ft)

Population
  - Total: 8,795 (2021 census)
  - Density: 2,321/km^{2} (6,010/sq mi)
- Postcode: 2072
Suburbs around Gordon
West Pymble	Pymble	St Ives
West Pymble	Gordon	St Ives
Killara	Killara	East Killara

Gordon is a suburb on the Upper North Shore of Sydney in the state of New South Wales, Australia 14 kilometres (9 mi) north-west of the Sydney Central Business District and is the administrative centre for the local government area of Ku-ring-gai Council. East Gordon is a locality within Gordon, and West Gordon is a locality within West Pymble.

== Geography ==
Gordon is located on the northern outskirts, about 18 kilometres from the Sydney central business district in the upper area of the North Shore. Most of the suburb is residential and sits within bushland along the banks of Stony Creek.

== History ==
The name 'Gordon' first appears as the name of the survey parish covering most of the upper north shore, assigned by the NSW Surveyor-General Sir Thomas Mitchell. This is believed to commemorate Sir Willoughby Gordon, with whom he had served during the Peninsular War and who was the quartermaster-general of the regiment in which Mitchell had served. The survey parish, and later suburb and municipality of Willoughby also commemorates his name.

Settlement of the area commenced about 1820. The early settlement at Gordon was originally known as Lane Cove. The earliest school at 'Lane Cove', as Gordon was then known, was established at the behest of Governor Macquarie in 1816. The first Lane Cove Post Office opened on 1 February 1860. The name of the village and Post Office was changed to Gordon, after the Gordondale estate of Robert McIntosh, on 1 June 1879.

In the late 20th century Gordon was the Australian headquarters of Sun Microsystems Australia (opposite the present Gordon library site). It also had a significant Ikea store on the corner of the Pacific Highway and Ryde Road (opposite the former 3M site on the northern or Pymble side of the intersection, circa 2014-2020 under legally frustrated intent to renovate for use by Bunnings).

=== Gordon Public School ===
The former Gordon Public School, now largely demolished and rebuilt as the library and police station, was constructed in 1878 on the Pacific Highway, having been designed by George Mansfield. A Gothic Revival style was used in accordance with the tradition that educational buildings, like churches, were designed in a Gothic style. A second block was added in 1912. The school was originally called Lane Cove School, and the name was officially changed to Gordon Public School in November 1885. The school buildings are one of the few remaining buildings that date back to the pioneering days of northern Sydney. It is listed on the Register of the National Estate. The Gordon Public School was closed in 1989, however East Gordon Public School and West Gordon Public School remain nearby.

=== Heritage listings ===
Gordon has a number of heritage-listed sites, including:

- 17 McIntosh Street: Eryldene, Gordon
- Middlemiss Street: Gordon railway station, Sydney
- 691 Pacific Highway: Iolanthe, Gordon
- 707 Pacific Highway: Tulkiyan
- 799 Pacific Highway: Gordon Public School (former)

In addition, Gordon is home to Sydney's largest flying fox colony, land for the protection of which was jointly purchased by the Heritage Council of New South Wales and Ku-ring-gai Council.

=== Notable former residents ===
- Dr John Bradfield (1867–1943), chief engineer of the Sydney Harbour Bridge, lived in Gordon where his grave is located at St Johns Anglican Church. Bradfield also lends his name to the electoral division of Bradfield which contains part of Gordon.
- Tim Schenken, a Formula One driver, was born in Gordon.
- Annie Wyatt was the founder of the National Trust in Australia. She lived for a time in a single-storey cottage in Park Avenue.
- Professor Eben Gowrie Waterhouse, academic linguist, Goethe Medal recipient, camellia breeder, Sydney University garden designer and trustee of the Art Gallery of New South Wales.
- Clover Moore, Lord Mayor of Sydney, grew up in Gordon.

== Transport ==
Gordon is located on a major transport artery, the Pacific Highway and near the intersection of Ryde and Mona Vale roads which form a link between the Northern Beaches, Homebush Bay and the St George District and Sutherland Shire.

Gordon railway station is on the North Shore railway line of the Sydney Trains network with frequent commuter services and express rail services during peak hours. The railway station was built in 1888 and has an important heritage relationship with its landscaped gardens – it has been preserved as an example of a historic Edwardian station. Lifts to the platforms have been recently added. A bus stop outside the station is a terminus for various routes including those to St Ives, West Pymble, Mona Vale/Warriewood and Macquarie University. These are operated by CDC NSW.

== Churches and education ==
Churches in Gordon comprise: St Johns Anglican Church (with an adjoining cemetery and columbarium), Gordon Uniting Church, Gordon Baptist Church and The Liberal Catholic Church of St. Francis.

Gordon is home to two schools:

- Gordon East Public School (K–6)
- Ravenswood School for Girls (K–12)

Gordon West Public School is named after the suburb, but is located in West Pymble.

Gordon Community Preschool supports children from 3–5 years of age.

== Commercial ==
Gordon has a commercial area with many shops and restaurants along the Pacific Highway and around Gordon railway station. Gordon Centre, is a shopping centre owned by Charter Hall which includes a Harvey Norman, Woolworths, Priceline, Bakers Delight, and offices. Gordon Centre was originally built as a Farmers & Co department store, now part of Myer, before reopening as Gordon Centre in 1985. McDonald's is also located nearby on the Pacific Highway (southbound side). Gordon Village Arcade is a shopping arcade also owned by Charter Hall and includes many stores including a post office. Gordon Private Hospital located on the Pacific Highway specialises in the treatment of mental health and is a teaching hospital affiliated with UNSW.

The administrative buildings for the local government area of Ku-ring-gai Council are located in Gordon.

== Sports ==
Rugby Union is the most popular sport in Gordon, and is represented in by the Gordon Rugby Football Club, known as the Gordon Highlanders in the Shute Shield, and the Gordon Gazelles in the Sydney Women's Premier Rugby. A close second most popular sport is Cricket and is represented by the Gordon District Cricket Club. Both the Cricket and Rugby Union clubs representing Gordon compete at Chatswood Oval. In Rugby league, Gordon is represented by the North Sydney Bears, officially the North Sydney District Rugby League Football Club. Despite departing the NRL after the 1999 season, and not having NRL representation since the short lived Northern Eagles joint venture with Manly Warringah, the NSDRLFC is the only club that does not compete in the NRL (Although there have been ongoing efforts to resurrect the Bears back into the NRL) in any form (Including joint ventures) to have a Junior Rugby League District. Junior Rugby League teams on the North Shore fall within the North Sydney District, in which clubs compete in a Joint District with Manly Warringah, and Gordon (The seat of Ku-ring-gai Council) is represented by the team that more specifically represents the LGA, the Ku-ring-gai Cubs, who play at Memorial Park in Turramurra

== Residential ==
Eryldene is a local historic house that is open to the public. Located in McIntosh Street, the house was designed for Professor Eben Gowrie Waterhouse by William Hardy Wilson and built circa 1913. The extensive garden is a significant part of the property in its own right. House and garden as a whole are listed on the Register of the National Estate. The house also has a state heritage listing.

Another notable home in the area is Tulkiyan, located on the Pacific Highway. This home was designed by Bertrand James Waterhouse, an architect who was popular for his residential work (he was also responsible for the design of Nutcote, the home of painter May Gibbs). He designed Tulkiyan in the Arts and Crafts style that he favoured in much of his work. Tulkiyan was built on part of a land grant that went back to 1823. The land changed hands many times until it was acquired by the Donaldson family, who commissioned Waterhouse to design the house. It stayed in the hands of the Donaldson family until 1994, when it was bequeathed to Ku-ring-gai Council. Tulkiyan has a state heritage listing.

The Arts and Crafts style favoured by Waterhouse was just one of the styles that were part of the Federation period that went from 1890 to 1915. Other prominent styles were the Federation Queen Anne style—the Australian version of the English Queen Anne style—and the Federation Bungalow style. Some notable examples of the latter style can be seen in Nelson Street, Gordon. Other architects who favoured Federation styles were Walter Liberty Vernon and Howard Joseland.

Gordon is also the location of a notable house designed by the architect Alexander Stewart Jolly. Nebraska, in Yarabah Avenue, is a distinctive home reminiscent of a log cabin. One of its features is the irregular stonework. It is heritage-listed.

45.3% of occupied private dwellings in Gordon are separate houses, 48.3% are flats, units or apartments and 3.5% are semi-detached (mainly townhouses). The average household consists of 2.7 people.

== Population ==
At the 2021 census, there were 8,795 residents in Gordon.

- The population of Gordon was about the same age as the rest of New South Wales, with a median age of 39 compared to the national median of 38, and 15.8% of people aged 65 years and over.
- 44.2% of people were born in Australia. The most common countries of birth were China 16.0%, South Korea 4.3%, Hong Kong 4.2%, England 3.6% and Taiwan 2.3%.
- 48.1% of people only spoke English at home. Other languages spoken at home included Mandarin 20.2%, Cantonese 9.0%, Korean 5.0%, Persian 2.2% and Japanese 1.3%.
- The median household income of $2,460 was higher than the national figure of $1,746.
- 35.3% of Gordon's population rent their home compared to 32.3% who own their home without a mortgage and 30.6% who do have a mortgage. The median weekly rent was $577 and the median monthly mortgage payment was $3,033.
- Gordon responded to the Census question about religion with No Religion 46.2%, Catholic 12.7%, Anglican 10.6%, 4.9% of people did not state their religion and 4.4% who practice Buddhism.

== Gallery ==
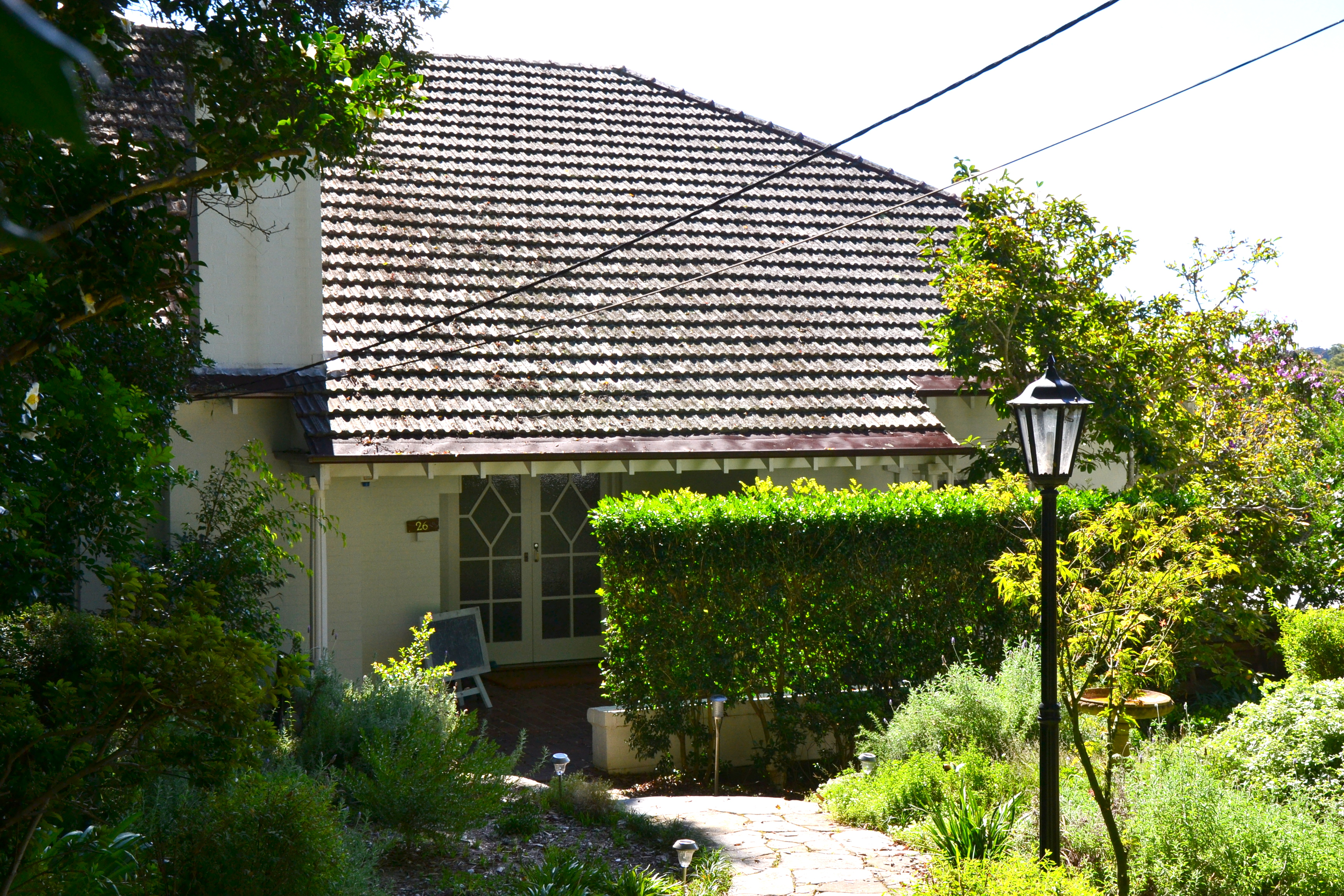
Home of Annie Wyatt, Park Avenue

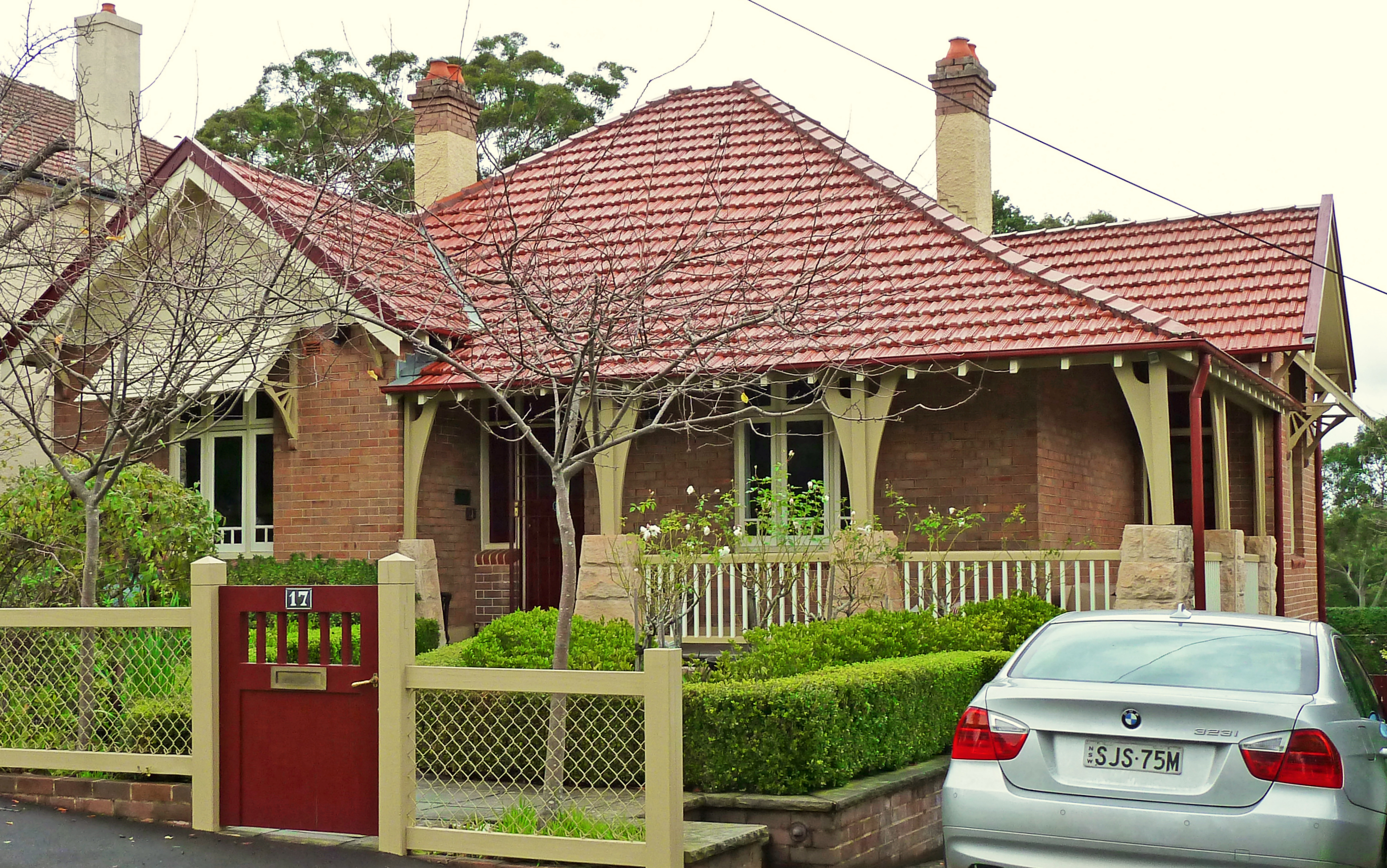
Federation house, Nelson Street

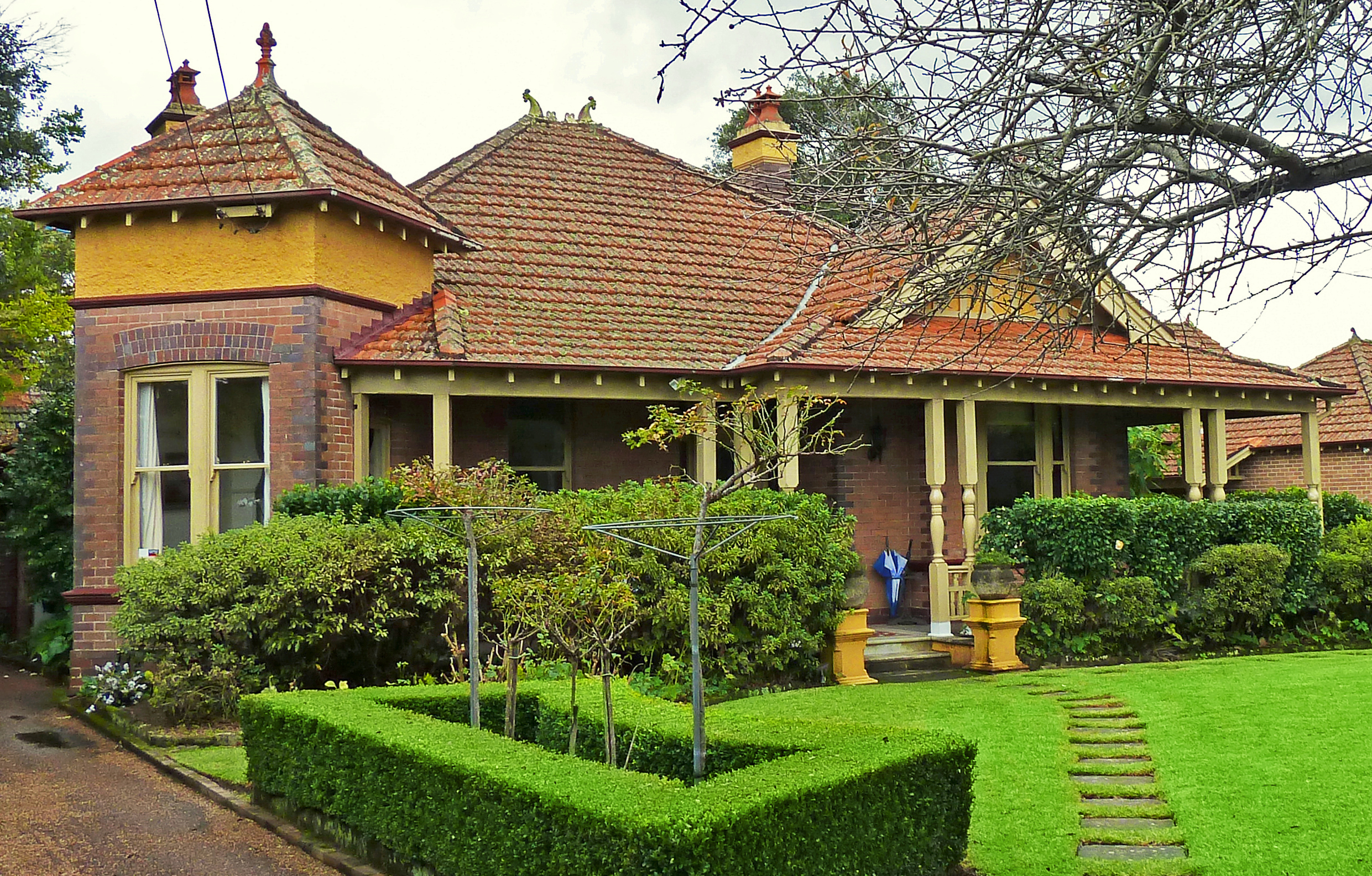
Federation bungalow, Nelson Street

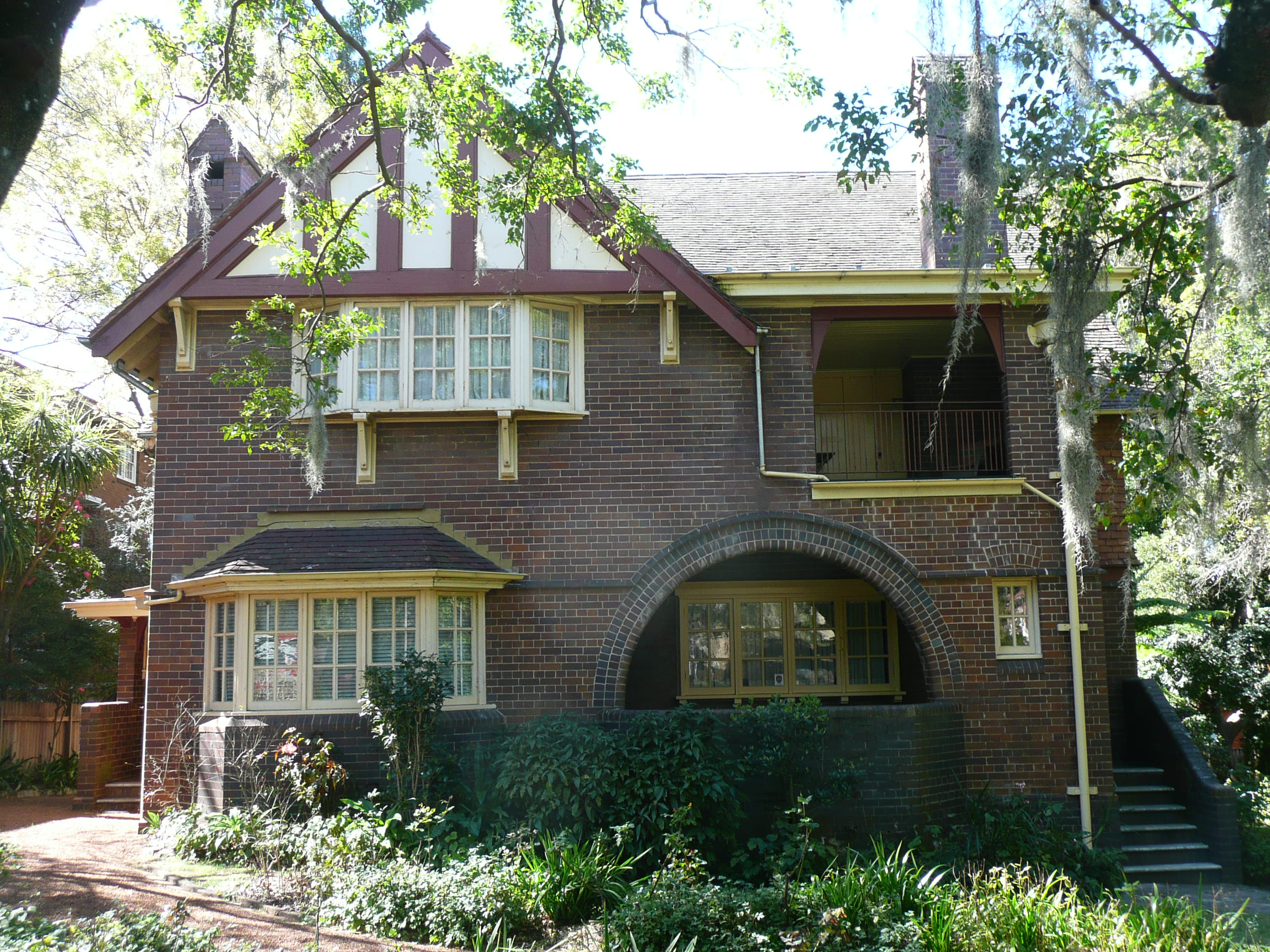
Tulkiyan, designed by B.J.Waterhouse

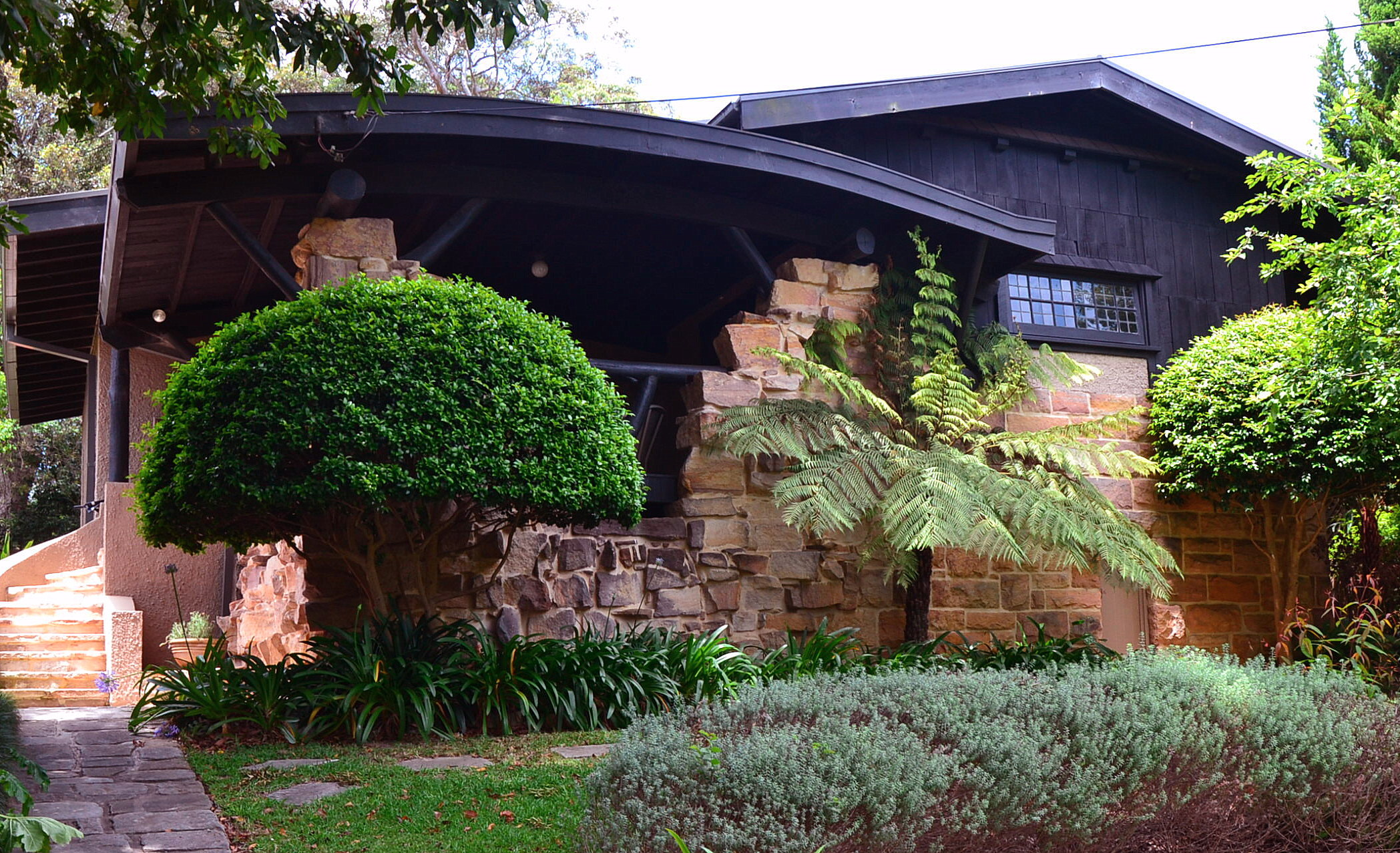
Nebraska, designed by Alexander Stewart Jolly

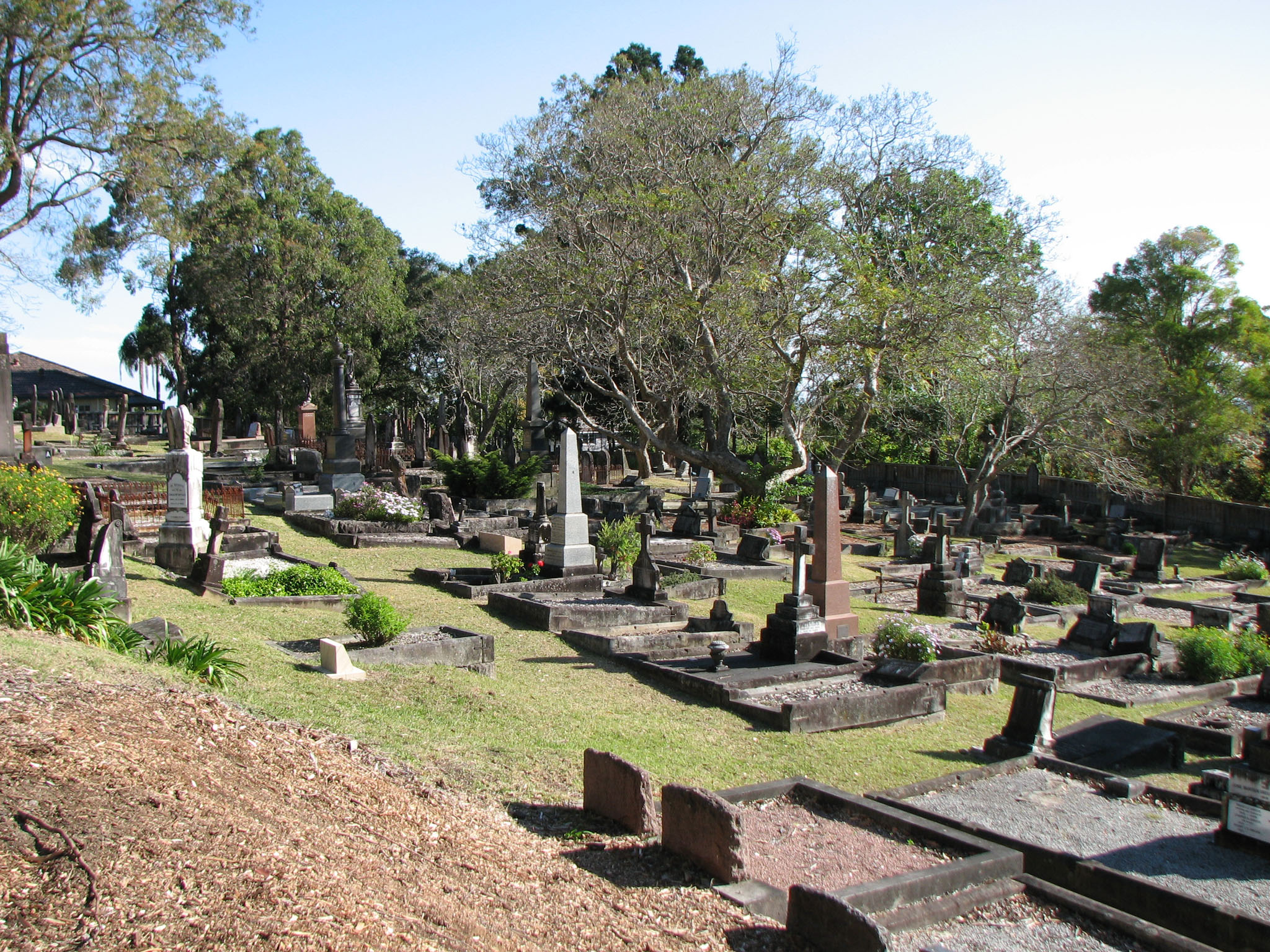
Cemetery adjoining Anglican Church of St John the Evangelist

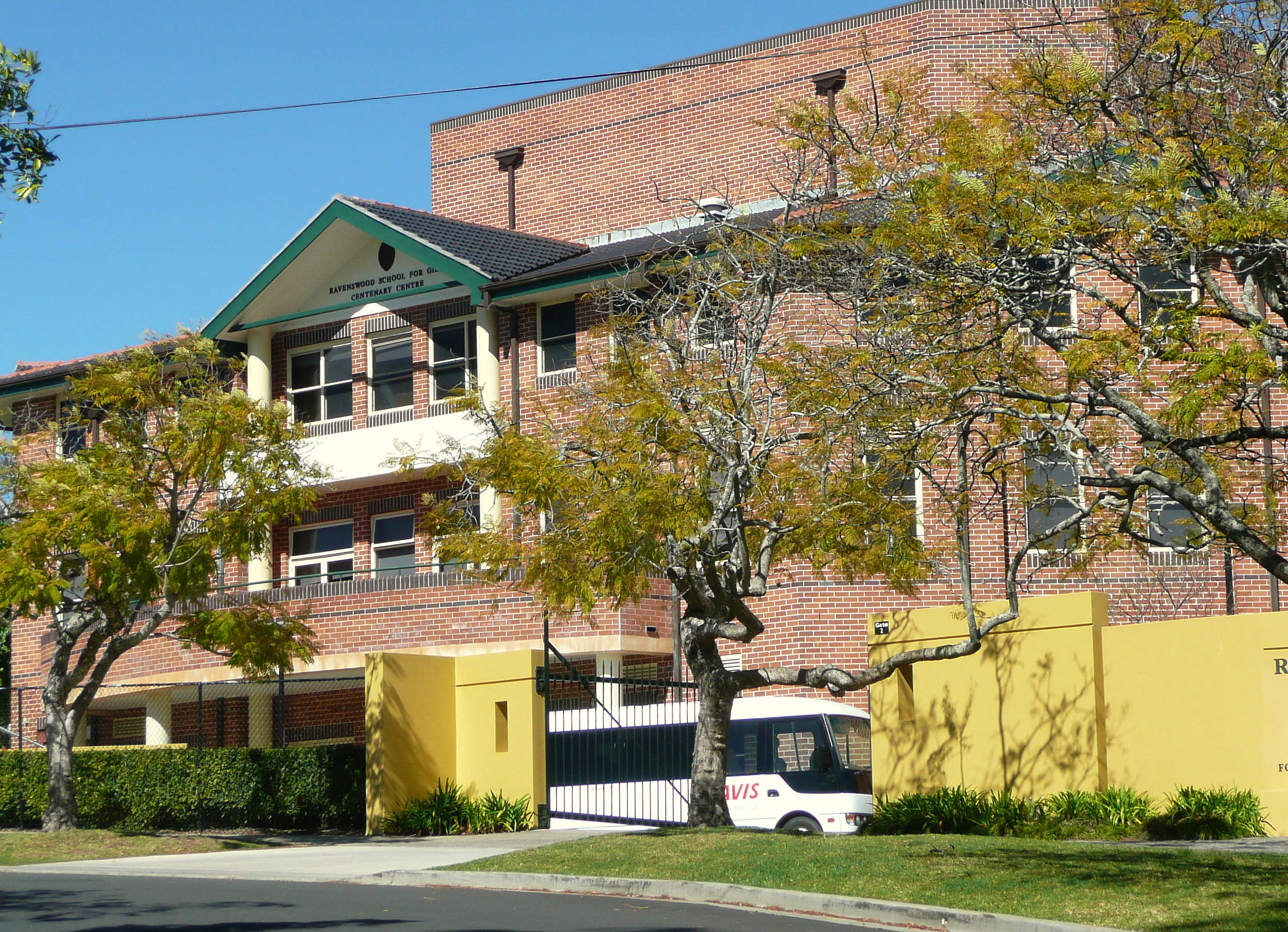
Ravenswood School

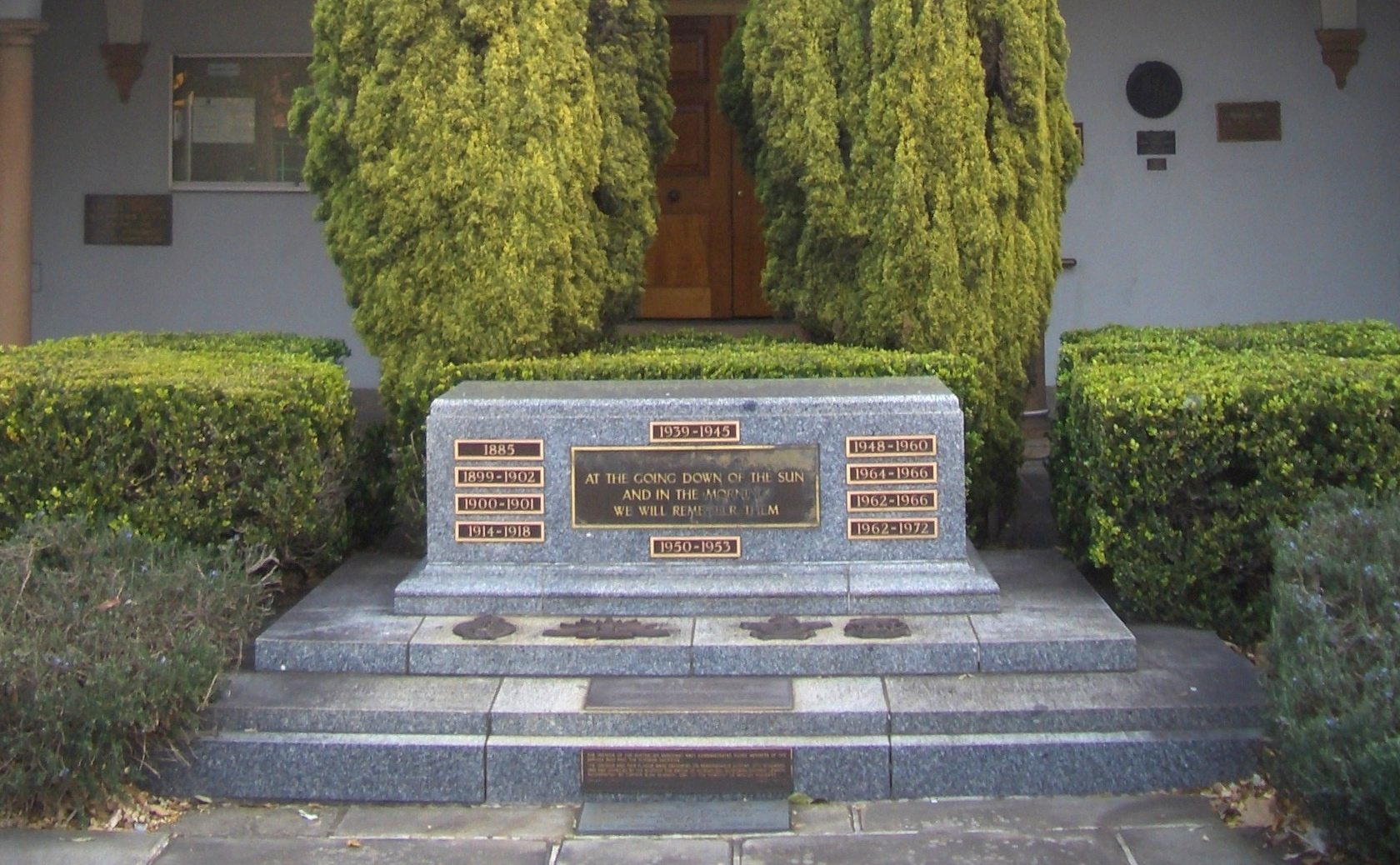
War Memorial and Council Chambers
