= Geography of New South Wales =

- Continent: Australia
- Coordinates: 32°S 147°E
- Area: Ranked 3rd among states and territories
  - Total: 801,150 km^{2} (309,330 sq mi)
- Coastline: 2,137 km (1,328 mi)
- Borders: Land borders: Queensland, South Australia, Victoria, Australian Capital Territory
- Highest point: Mount Kosciuszko; 2,228 metres (7,310 ft)
- Longest river: Murray River; 1,721 kilometres (1,069 mi)
- Largest lake: Lake Eucumbene; 4,798 square kilometres (1,853 sq mi)

New South Wales (abbreviated as NSW) is Australia's most populous state, located in the east coast of the continent. It is in the Southern Hemisphere between latitudes 28 and 38 degrees south of the equator and longitudes 141 and 154 degrees east of the Universal Prime Meridian (formerly known as the Greenwich meridian). The state is in the warm temperate climatic zone.

== Features ==
The area of New South Wales is 801,150 km^{2} (309,326 sq mi), including 13 km^{2} (5 sq mi) of island area. The coastline is 2,137 km (1,328 mi) in length, including 130 km (81 mi) of island coastline.

Cape Byron, in the north-east of the state, is Australia's most easterly mainland point.

The state is bordered on the north by Queensland, on the west by South Australia, and on the south by Victoria. Its coast faces the Tasman Sea. New South Wales contains two Federal enclaves: the Australian Capital Territory (ACT), and the Jervis Bay Territory.

New South Wales can be divided physically into four sections:

- A thin coastal strip, with climates warming from cool temperate on the far south coast to subtropical near the Queensland border, including the regions south of Sydney such as the Illawarra and Shoalhaven near Nowra. North of Sydney are the Central Coast and Newcastle, Hunter Region, Mid North Coast and Northern Rivers regions.
- The mountainous areas of the Great Dividing Range and the high country surrounding them. Whilst not particularly steep, many peaks rise above 1,000 m, with the highest Mount Kosciuszko at 2,229 m (7,308 ft). This includes the Southern Highlands, Central Tablelands and the Northern Tablelands.
- The agricultural plains that fill a significant portion of the state's area, with a much sparser population than the coast, including The Riverina area around Wagga Wagga.
- The Western Plains covering almost two-thirds of the state. In some years production is limited by water availability.

The steep escarpment of the Blue Mountains to the west of Sydney prevented European exploration beyond the coastal strip for several years until explorer Gregory Blaxland found a way through in 1813, 25 years after the first settlement in Sydney.

== Cities and towns ==
Its four main cities from north to south are Newcastle, Gosford, Sydney, and Wollongong which all lie along the coast. Other cities and towns include Albury, Broken Hill, Dubbo, Tamworth, Armidale, Lismore, Nowra, Griffith, Leeton, Wagga Wagga, Goulburn, Port Macquarie and Coffs Harbour.

== Climate ==
Köppen climate types in New South Wales

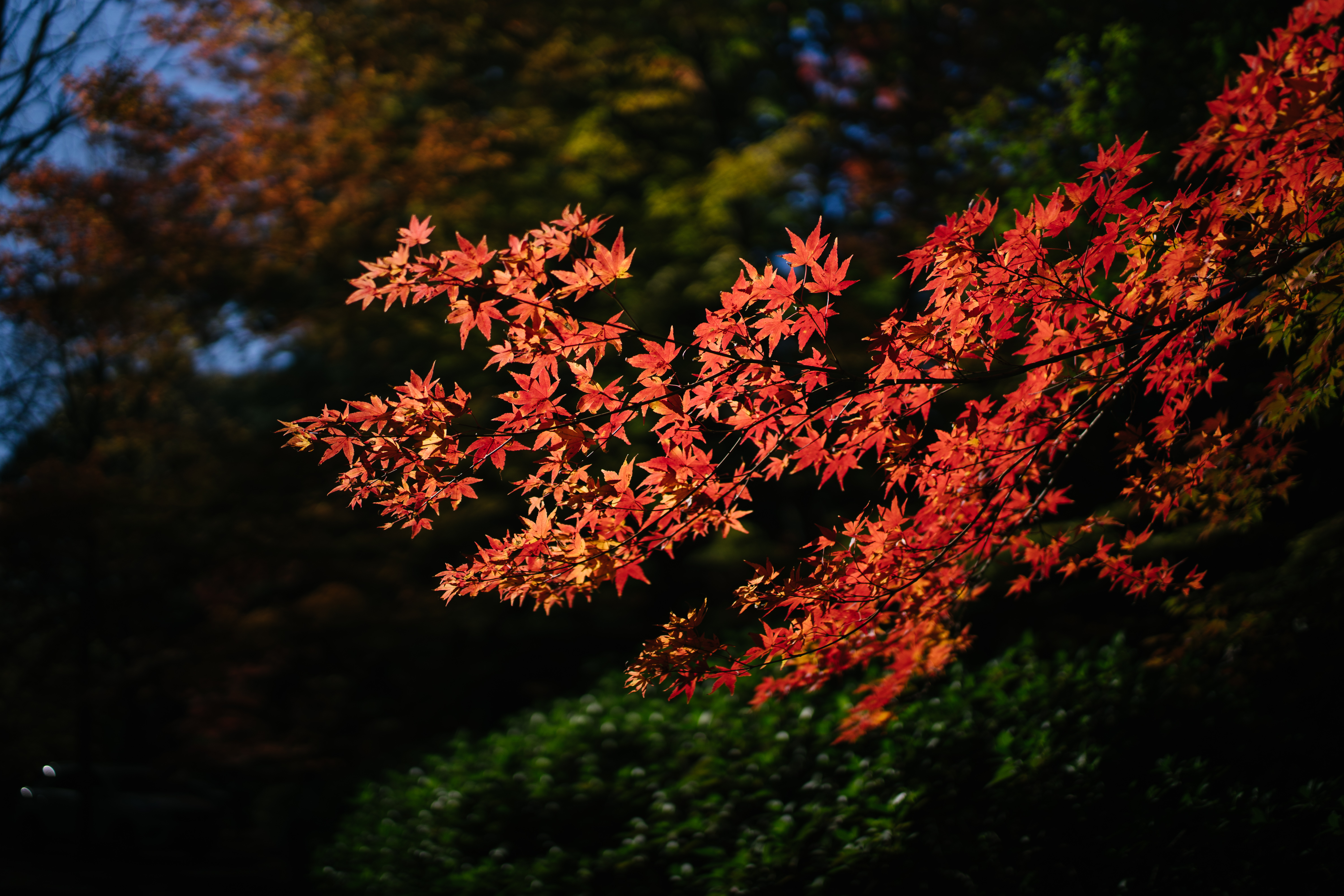
Autumn colour at Mount Wilson

Over half of New South Wales has an arid to semi-arid climate, where the rainfall is quite low. Summer temperatures are often very hot, while winter nights can be cold. Most of the rest of the state has a humid subtropical climate or an oceanic climate. Precipitation varies throughout the state. The north-west receives the least, getting less than 180 mm (7 in) annually, while most of the east receives between 700 and 1,400 mm (28 and 55 in) of rainfall. Rainfall can be as high as 2,000 to 2,500 millimetres (79 to 98 in) in the wettest areas, such as Charlotte Pass and Dorrigo. In the south, precipitation is heaviest in winter because of cold fronts which move across Australia, while in the north, rain is heaviest in summer from tropical systems and even cyclones on rare occasions. During winter, the coastal plain can be relatively dry because of foehn winds which blow from the Great Dividing Range. The mountain can block cold fronts coming from the Southern Ocean, and can produce foehn winds on the leeward side.

The climate in the southern half of the state is generally warm and hot in the summer months and mild and cool in the winter. Sydney, the largest city, has a humid subtropical climate (Köppen Cfa) with no dry season. Wollongong is in the transitional zone between an oceanic climate (Köppen Cfb) and a humid subtropical climate.

Snowfall can be common in the high-altitude parts of the range, occasionally occurring as far north as the Queensland border. On the highest peaks of the Snowy Mountains, the climate can be subpolar oceanic, a subarctic climate and even an alpine climate on the higher peaks with cold temperatures and heavy snowfall. The Blue Mountains, Southern Tablelands and Central Tablelands, which are situated on the Great Dividing Range, have mild or warm summers and cold winters, although not as cold as those in the Snowy Mountains.

The highest maximum temperature recorded was 49.7 °C (121 °F) at Menindee on 10 January 1939 and at Bourke. The lowest minimum temperature ever recorded was −23.0 °C (−9 °F) at Charlotte Pass in the Snowy Mountains on 29 June 1994. This is also the lowest temperature recorded in the whole of Australia. Charlotte Pass often has a snow depth of 2 metres in winter, and snow has even accumulated and persisted in the middle of summer.

Climate data for New South Wales (Extremes)
Month	Jan	Feb	Mar	Apr	May	Jun	Jul	Aug	Sep	Oct	Nov	Dec	Year
Record high °C (°F)	49.7 (121.5)	48.5 (119.3)	45.0 (113.0)	40.0 (104.0)	34.4 (93.9)	31.0 (87.8)	31.7 (89.1)	37.8 (100.0)	39.6 (103.3)	43.9 (111.0)	46.8 (116.2)	48.9 (120.0)	49.7 (121.5)
Record low °C (°F)	−5.6 (21.9)	−7.0 (19.4)	−7.2 (19.0)	−13.0 (8.6)	−13.4 (7.9)	−23.0 (−9.4)	−19.6 (−3.3)	−20.6 (−5.1)	−16.7 (1.9)	−12.0 (10.4)	−9.4 (15.1)	−7.0 (19.4)	−23.0 (−9.4)
Source: Bureau of Meteorology

Climate data for Sydney (Observatory Hill) 1991–2020 averages, 1861–present extremes
Month	Jan	Feb	Mar	Apr	May	Jun	Jul	Aug	Sep	Oct	Nov	Dec	Year
Record high °C (°F)	45.8 (114.4)	42.1 (107.8)	39.8 (103.6)	35.4 (95.7)	30.0 (86.0)	26.9 (80.4)	26.5 (79.7)	31.3 (88.3)	34.6 (94.3)	38.2 (100.8)	41.8 (107.2)	42.2 (108.0)	45.8 (114.4)
Mean maximum °C (°F)	36.8 (98.2)	34.1 (93.4)	32.2 (90.0)	29.7 (85.5)	26.2 (79.2)	22.3 (72.1)	22.9 (73.2)	25.4 (77.7)	29.9 (85.8)	33.6 (92.5)	34.1 (93.4)	34.4 (93.9)	38.8 (101.8)
Mean daily maximum °C (°F)	27.0 (80.6)	26.8 (80.2)	25.7 (78.3)	23.6 (74.5)	20.9 (69.6)	18.3 (64.9)	17.9 (64.2)	19.3 (66.7)	21.6 (70.9)	23.2 (73.8)	24.2 (75.6)	25.7 (78.3)	22.8 (73.0)
Daily mean °C (°F)	23.5 (74.3)	23.4 (74.1)	22.1 (71.8)	19.5 (67.1)	16.6 (61.9)	14.2 (57.6)	13.4 (56.1)	14.5 (58.1)	17.0 (62.6)	18.9 (66.0)	20.4 (68.7)	22.1 (71.8)	18.8 (65.8)
Mean daily minimum °C (°F)	20.0 (68.0)	19.9 (67.8)	18.4 (65.1)	15.3 (59.5)	12.3 (54.1)	10.0 (50.0)	8.9 (48.0)	9.7 (49.5)	12.3 (54.1)	14.6 (58.3)	16.6 (61.9)	18.4 (65.1)	14.7 (58.5)
Mean minimum °C (°F)	16.1 (61.0)	16.1 (61.0)	14.2 (57.6)	11.0 (51.8)	8.3 (46.9)	6.5 (43.7)	5.7 (42.3)	6.1 (43.0)	8.0 (46.4)	9.8 (49.6)	12.0 (53.6)	13.9 (57.0)	5.3 (41.5)
Record low °C (°F)	10.6 (51.1)	9.6 (49.3)	9.3 (48.7)	7.0 (44.6)	4.4 (39.9)	2.1 (35.8)	2.2 (36.0)	2.7 (36.9)	4.9 (40.8)	5.7 (42.3)	7.7 (45.9)	9.1 (48.4)	2.1 (35.8)
Average rainfall mm (inches)	91.1 (3.59)	131.5 (5.18)	117.5 (4.63)	114.1 (4.49)	100.8 (3.97)	142.0 (5.59)	80.3 (3.16)	75.1 (2.96)	63.4 (2.50)	67.7 (2.67)	90.6 (3.57)	73.0 (2.87)	1,149.7 (45.26)
Average rainy days (≥ 1 mm)	8.2	9.0	10.1	7.9	7.9	9.3	7.2	5.6	5.8	7.6	8.7	7.9	95.2
Average afternoon relative humidity (%)	60	62	59	58	58	56	52	47	49	53	57	58	56
Average dew point °C (°F)	16.5 (61.7)	17.2 (63.0)	15.4 (59.7)	12.7 (54.9)	10.3 (50.5)	7.8 (46.0)	6.1 (43.0)	5.4 (41.7)	7.8 (46.0)	10.2 (50.4)	12.6 (54.7)	14.6 (58.3)	11.4 (52.5)
Mean monthly sunshine hours	232.5	205.9	210.8	213.0	204.6	171.0	207.7	248.0	243.0	244.9	222.0	235.6	2,639
Percentage possible sunshine	53	54	55	63	63	57	66	72	67	61	55	55	60
Source 1: Bureau of Meteorology
Source 2: Bureau of Meteorology, Sydney Airport (sunshine hours)

Climate data for Wollongong (Köppen Cfb/Cfa)
Month	Jan	Feb	Mar	Apr	May	Jun	Jul	Aug	Sep	Oct	Nov	Dec	Year
Record high °C (°F)	44.1 (111.4)	41.7 (107.1)	40.2 (104.4)	35.4 (95.7)	28.5 (83.3)	24.7 (76.5)	25.7 (78.3)	30.3 (86.5)	34.2 (93.6)	38.8 (101.8)	40.6 (105.1)	41.5 (106.7)	44.1 (111.4)
Mean maximum °C (°F)	29.7 (85.5)	29.4 (84.9)	28.0 (82.4)	26.3 (79.3)	23.1 (73.6)	20.5 (68.9)	20.0 (68.0)	22.0 (71.6)	25.6 (78.1)	27.9 (82.2)	28.0 (82.4)	30.4 (86.7)	30.4 (86.7)
Mean daily maximum °C (°F)	25.6 (78.1)	25.6 (78.1)	24.5 (76.1)	22.5 (72.5)	20.0 (68.0)	17.6 (63.7)	17.0 (62.6)	18.3 (64.9)	20.3 (68.5)	22.1 (71.8)	22.9 (73.2)	25.0 (77.0)	21.8 (71.2)
Daily mean °C (°F)	21.8 (71.2)	21.9 (71.4)	20.6 (69.1)	18.4 (65.1)	15.9 (60.6)	13.6 (56.5)	12.7 (54.9)	13.6 (56.5)	15.5 (59.9)	17.4 (63.3)	18.7 (65.7)	20.8 (69.4)	17.6 (63.6)
Mean daily minimum °C (°F)	17.9 (64.2)	18.2 (64.8)	16.7 (62.1)	14.2 (57.6)	11.8 (53.2)	9.5 (49.1)	8.3 (46.9)	8.8 (47.8)	10.6 (51.1)	12.6 (54.7)	14.4 (57.9)	16.5 (61.7)	13.3 (55.9)
Mean minimum °C (°F)	15.0 (59.0)	15.4 (59.7)	14.0 (57.2)	10.9 (51.6)	8.3 (46.9)	6.0 (42.8)	5.0 (41.0)	5.5 (41.9)	7.2 (45.0)	9.1 (48.4)	11.0 (51.8)	13.4 (56.1)	5.0 (41.0)
Record low °C (°F)	9.6 (49.3)	10.3 (50.5)	9.1 (48.4)	5.1 (41.2)	3.1 (37.6)	2.0 (35.6)	0.8 (33.4)	2.0 (35.6)	3.3 (37.9)	4.7 (40.5)	5.4 (41.7)	8.3 (46.9)	0.8 (33.4)
Average precipitation mm (inches)	130.3 (5.13)	156.4 (6.16)	160.4 (6.31)	129.3 (5.09)	106.4 (4.19)	112.4 (4.43)	63.4 (2.50)	83.3 (3.28)	67.4 (2.65)	100.5 (3.96)	115.6 (4.55)	97.3 (3.83)	1,322.7 (52.08)
Average precipitation days (≥ 1.0 mm)	10.5	10.4	10.8	8.3	7.8	7.1	5.9	5.6	6.7	8.4	10.4	9.1	101
Average relative humidity (%)	69.0	71.0	68.0	64.0	64.0	62.0	58.0	54.5	55.0	60.5	65.0	65.5	63.0
Average dew point °C (°F)	16.7 (62.1)	17.1 (62.8)	15.5 (59.9)	12.7 (54.9)	10.3 (50.5)	7.4 (45.3)	5.6 (42.1)	5.8 (42.4)	7.7 (45.9)	10.5 (50.9)	12.7 (54.9)	14.8 (58.6)	11.4 (52.5)
Source: Australian Bureau of Meteorology (temperature, precipitation, humidity- 1970–2008 normals and extremes)

Climate data for Broken Hill (Köppen BWh)
Month	Jan	Feb	Mar	Apr	May	Jun	Jul	Aug	Sep	Oct	Nov	Dec	Year
Record high °C (°F)	46.3 (115.3)	45.5 (113.9)	41.3 (106.3)	36.8 (98.2)	28.5 (83.3)	26.1 (79.0)	26.2 (79.2)	31.0 (87.8)	37.0 (98.6)	39.0 (102.2)	44.7 (112.5)	45.6 (114.1)	46.3 (115.3)
Mean maximum °C (°F)	40.6 (105.1)	38.7 (101.7)	35.7 (96.3)	30.3 (86.5)	24.6 (76.3)	19.9 (67.8)	19.8 (67.6)	23.0 (73.4)	29.0 (84.2)	33.2 (91.8)	36.4 (97.5)	38.6 (101.5)	40.6 (105.1)
Mean daily maximum °C (°F)	33.8 (92.8)	32.6 (90.7)	29.1 (84.4)	24.5 (76.1)	19.3 (66.7)	16.0 (60.8)	15.8 (60.4)	18.0 (64.4)	21.9 (71.4)	25.6 (78.1)	29.1 (84.4)	31.7 (89.1)	24.8 (76.6)
Daily mean °C (°F)	26.6 (79.9)	25.7 (78.3)	22.3 (72.1)	18.0 (64.4)	13.6 (56.5)	10.8 (51.4)	10.3 (50.5)	11.9 (53.4)	15.3 (59.5)	18.2 (64.8)	22.1 (71.8)	24.6 (76.3)	18.3 (64.9)
Mean daily minimum °C (°F)	19.4 (66.9)	18.7 (65.7)	15.4 (59.7)	11.5 (52.7)	7.9 (46.2)	5.5 (41.9)	4.8 (40.6)	5.7 (42.3)	8.6 (47.5)	11.7 (53.1)	15.0 (59.0)	17.4 (63.3)	11.8 (53.2)
Mean minimum °C (°F)	13.4 (56.1)	13.0 (55.4)	10.2 (50.4)	6.6 (43.9)	3.3 (37.9)	1.0 (33.8)	0.8 (33.4)	1.5 (34.7)	4.2 (39.6)	6.6 (43.9)	9.2 (48.6)	11.8 (53.2)	0.8 (33.4)
Record low °C (°F)	8.0 (46.4)	6.7 (44.1)	6.3 (43.3)	3.1 (37.6)	−0.6 (30.9)	−2.5 (27.5)	−2.9 (26.8)	−1.6 (29.1)	−0.9 (30.4)	1.0 (33.8)	4.7 (40.5)	7.0 (44.6)	−2.9 (26.8)
Average precipitation mm (inches)	26.0 (1.02)	26.1 (1.03)	18.3 (0.72)	14.4 (0.57)	14.0 (0.55)	16.0 (0.63)	17.2 (0.68)	15.5 (0.61)	19.5 (0.77)	17.7 (0.70)	22.4 (0.88)	17.6 (0.69)	224.7 (8.85)
Average precipitation days (≥ 1.0 mm)	2.4	2.3	2.1	1.7	2.5	2.4	3.0	2.9	2.6	2.6	3.3	2.3	30.1
Average relative humidity (%)	33.5	38.0	38.5	41.0	54.5	62.5	60.0	48.5	44.0	36.5	35.5	33.0	43.8
Average dew point °C (°F)	7.5 (45.5)	9.1 (48.4)	7.2 (45.0)	5.7 (42.3)	6.0 (42.8)	5.2 (41.4)	3.9 (39.0)	2.8 (37.0)	3.7 (38.7)	3.5 (38.3)	5.1 (41.2)	5.6 (42.1)	5.4 (41.8)
Source 1: Australian Bureau of Meteorology (temperature, precipitation, humidity- 1991–2020 normals)
Source 2: Australian Bureau of Meteorology (1947–present extremes)

Climate data for Charlotte Pass (Köppen Dfc)
Month	Jan	Feb	Mar	Apr	May	Jun	Jul	Aug	Sep	Oct	Nov	Dec	Year
Record high °C (°F)	29.7 (85.5)	28.0 (82.4)	24.5 (76.1)	19.8 (67.6)	16.2 (61.2)	12.3 (54.1)	9.0 (48.2)	11.1 (52.0)	15.6 (60.1)	20.5 (68.9)	28.3 (82.9)	28.9 (84.0)	29.7 (85.5)
Mean daily maximum °C (°F)	17.9 (64.2)	17.2 (63.0)	14.7 (58.5)	10.4 (50.7)	6.8 (44.2)	3.3 (37.9)	1.9 (35.4)	2.6 (36.7)	5.0 (41.0)	9.4 (48.9)	12.8 (55.0)	15.5 (59.9)	9.8 (49.6)
Daily mean °C (°F)	11.7 (53.1)	11.1 (52.0)	8.7 (47.7)	5.0 (41.0)	2.1 (35.8)	−0.9 (30.4)	−2.3 (27.9)	−1.5 (29.3)	0.9 (33.6)	4.5 (40.1)	7.5 (45.5)	9.6 (49.3)	4.7 (40.5)
Mean daily minimum °C (°F)	5.4 (41.7)	5.0 (41.0)	2.6 (36.7)	−0.5 (31.1)	−2.7 (27.1)	−5.2 (22.6)	−6.6 (20.1)	−5.7 (21.7)	−3.3 (26.1)	−0.4 (31.3)	2.1 (35.8)	3.7 (38.7)	−0.5 (31.2)
Record low °C (°F)	−5.6 (21.9)	−5.5 (22.1)	−6.7 (19.9)	−13.0 (8.6)	−13.4 (7.9)	−23.0 (−9.4)	−19.6 (−3.3)	−20.6 (−5.1)	−16.7 (1.9)	−12.0 (10.4)	−9.4 (15.1)	−7.0 (19.4)	−23.0 (−9.4)
Average precipitation mm (inches)	128.0 (5.04)	132.9 (5.23)	141.0 (5.55)	150.2 (5.91)	178.0 (7.01)	180.2 (7.09)	181.0 (7.13)	201.1 (7.92)	189.2 (7.45)	206.7 (8.14)	189.9 (7.48)	150.1 (5.91)	2,028.3 (79.86)
Average precipitation days	10.3	10.4	10.1	10.6	11.9	12.8	12.2	12.9	11.0	11.0	11.7	9.0	133.9
Average relative humidity (%)	62	62	61	67	75	86	90	87	79	68	65	62	72
Source: Australian Bureau of Meteorology; Charlotte Pass (Kosciuszko Chalet)

== Gallery ==
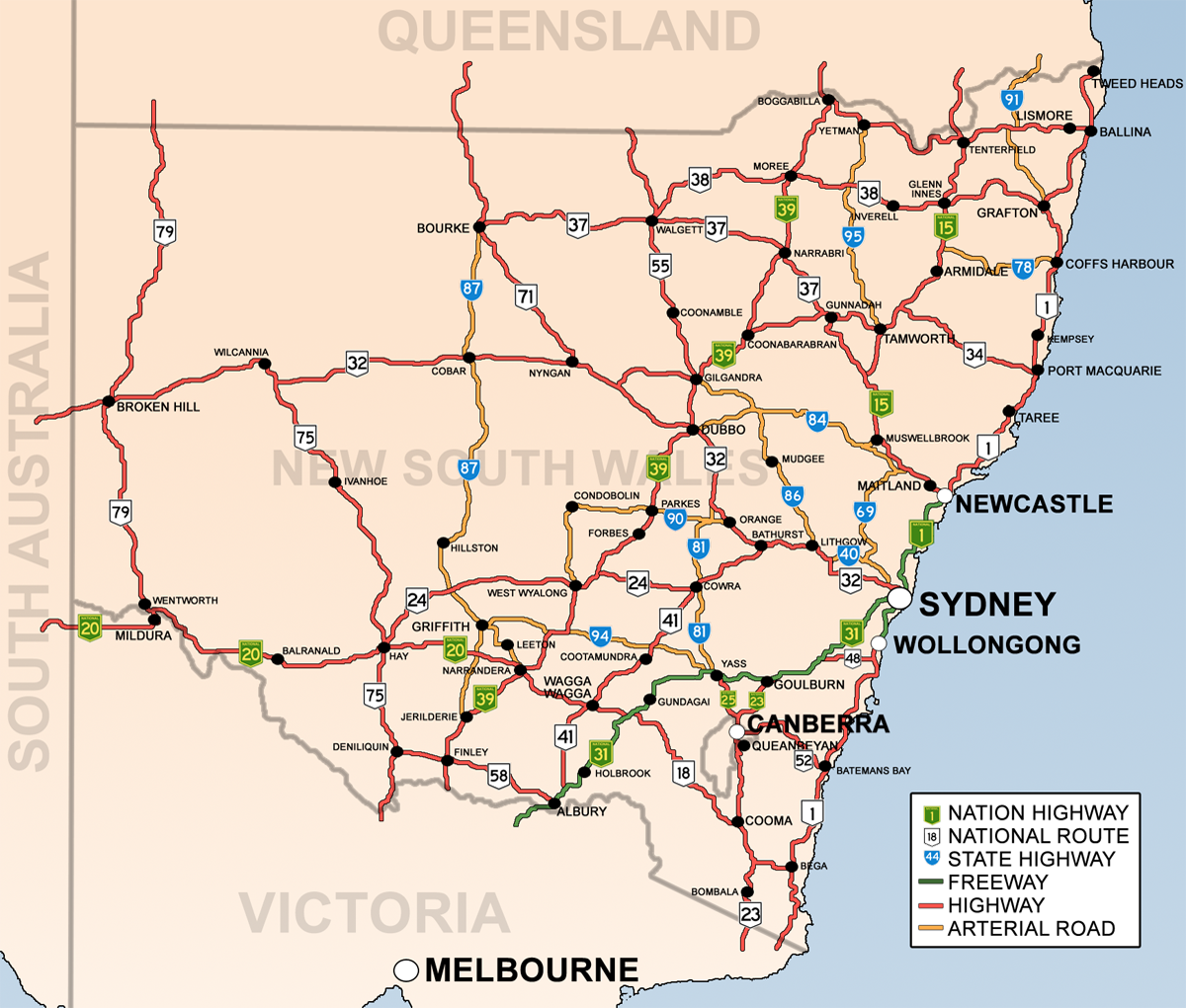
New South Wales showing highways connecting towns and major centres.

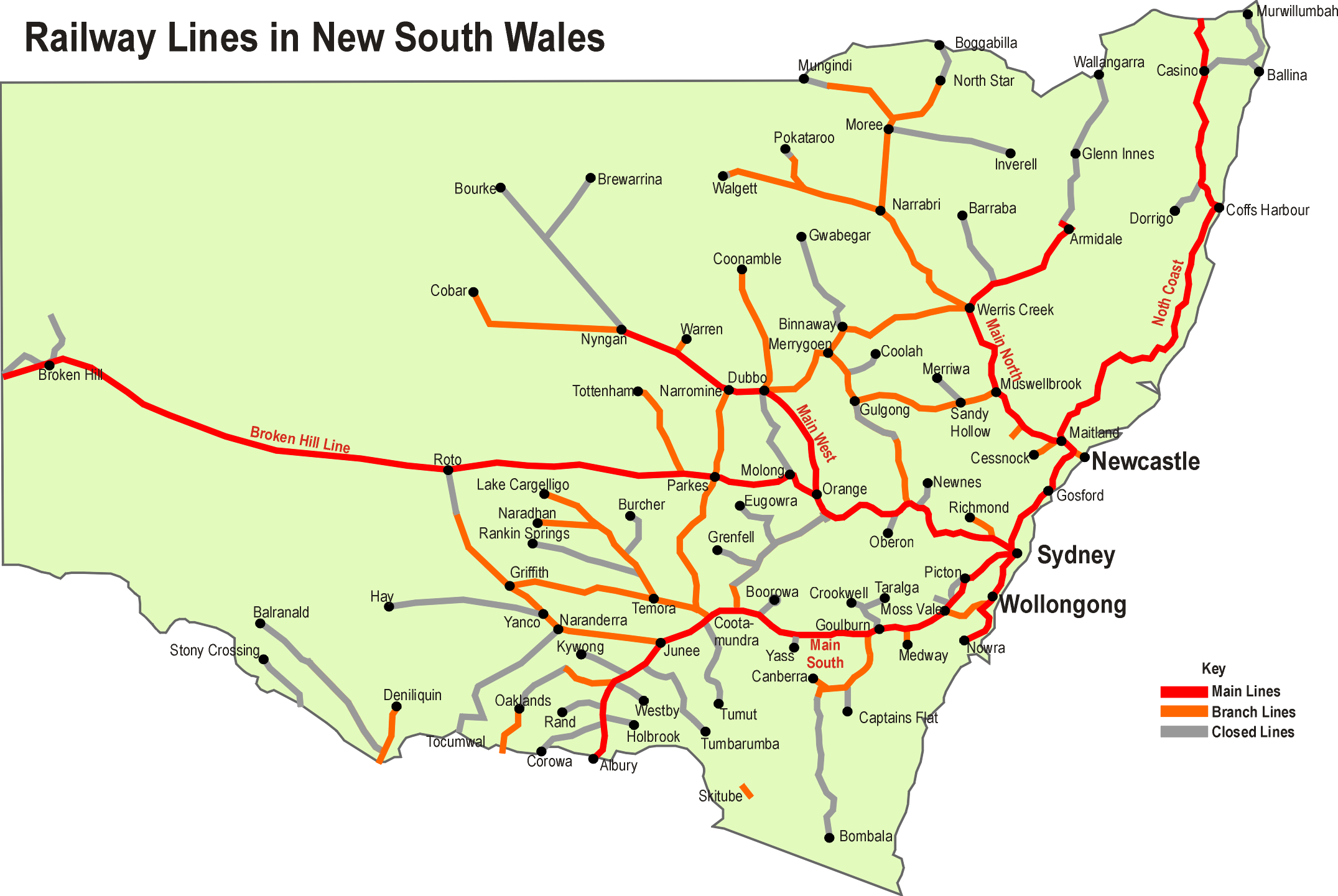
New South Wales showing railways connecting towns and major centres.

== See also ==
- Regions of New South Wales
- Geography of Sydney
