= Ksubi =

Australian fashion label

- Industry: Fashion retail
- Founded: 1999; 27 years ago
- Headquarters: Sydney, Australia
- Area served: Worldwide
- Key people: Gareth Moody; Dan Single; George Gorrow; Paul Wilson
- Products: Apparel, accessories
- Website: www.ksubi.com

Ksubi is an Australian fashion label founded in 1999 on Sydney's Northern Beaches. Known for signature denim and box-cross logo, the brand has built an international presence and can be found in premium stores across Australia, North America and Europe.

== History ==
In 1999 Gareth Moody, Dan Single, Paul Wilson and George Gorrow were dissatisfied with the range of denim fits on the market, leading them to manufacture their own jeans and other denim garments (originally under the name “tsubi”).

Ksubi made its international debut in London in 2002, with fashion displays held at the abandoned Aldwych tube station.

In 2006, the brand changed its name to Ksubi as a result of a trademark infringement dispute.

In 2010, Ksubi was purchased by clothing manufacturer Bleach, who also owned and produced Insight and Something Else. In 2013, Bleach went into liquidation and Breakwater Management acquired Ksubi. In 2014 the licence for global distribution was obtained by The General Pants Group. It is currently independently owned. In 2016, GPG embarked on an international roll out of physical stores starting with New York and Los Angeles.

In 2017, Travis Scott christened the New York store with a 40 minute in-store performance to launch his collaboration with Ksubi. In 2019, Kendall Jenner collaborated on an 8-piece capsule collection entitled "Sign of the Times". In 2019, Ksubi teamed up with Kith on their annual NYFW show.

In 2020, Ksubi separated from GPG with former CEO Craig King leading the new company Ksubi Sales International. In 2022, after COVID pandemic interruptions Ksubi rebooted its global expansion with flagships in Miami, Chicago and London. In 2023, Ksubi expanded its categories into underwear and kids. In September 2024, Pip Edwards was named creative director of Ksubi.

== Collaborations ==
Ksubi has collaborated with a number of influential figures and brands across the fashion, music and art worlds.

In 2006 a collaborative project with U.S. style icon and fashion designer, Jeremy Scott, called "Jeremy Loves Ksubi" was shown at Scott's New York Fashion Week Parade alongside his own collection.

Previewing at London Fashion Week in September 2007 was Ksubi's collaboration with Richard Nicoll. "Ksubi for Richard Nicoll sunglasses SS08", was an eyewear collection designed by Nicoll consisting of three styles and drawing colours from Nicoll's collection.

In 2017 Ksubi created a limited edition collection with rapper Travis Scott. The collaboration received global attention and sold out world wide. In July 2019, model Kendall Jenner became the face for Ksubi's Fall 20 Sign of the Times collection, including an 8-piece capsule which featured in the campaign.

On 21 November 2019 Ksubi announced a collaboration with New York street artist Hidji World, a noted member of the AWGE group.

Between 2019 and 2023, Ksubi collaborated with artists Slumpy Kev, DNTWATCHTV, Slawn, models Cat McNeil, Josephine Skriver, sports leisure brand P.E Nation, Juice Wrld, and A$AP Mob member, A$AP TyY.

== Stores ==
The Ksubi Flagship store is based in SoHo, New York with other retail locations including Los Angeles, Chicago, Miami and more.

Ksubi can be found in premium stores across the globe. Stockists include Barneys, Saks and Kith in the United States, Holt Renfrew in Canada, Harrods and Selfridges department store in the United Kingdom, RonHerman in Japan.

The brand has also strengthened its presence in Australia, with standalone Ksubi stores open in Sydney (Westfield Bondi Junction) and Melbourne (Little Bourke Street) as part of its expanded Australian retail footprint.

== Pronunciation ==
Ksubi is pronounced as "soobie" in Australian accents, and "sue-bee" in American accents. The ‘K’ is silent.

== Controversy ==
The label hit headlines around the world in 2001 when they unleashed 200 live rats onto the catwalk.

Ksubi turned heads in 2007 with a catalogue displaying sunglasses propped on penises.

In 2013 Ksubi's Sex! & Fashion capsule collection received consumer backlash concerning ‘sexually provocative imagery’ in their General Pants Co. window campaign.

== Books and photography exhibitions ==
In 2005 Ksubi released a book to mark their five-year anniversary. They held launches for it in Sydney, Paris, Tokyo, London, Hong Kong and Los Angeles.

Following this, in 2006, Ksubi also toured an exhibition of campaign photographs they commissioned for their eyewear range, "Magnum Opus", to Sydney, Melbourne, Perth, and Paris.

In 2007 Ksubi produced and released the book Sign of the Times. The photographic reportage style book featured photos by George Gorrow, Paul Wilson and Michael Nolan. The photos captured the journey of a 7 ft high Ksubi sculpture depicting a giant hand doing the peace symbol with the fingers cut off and bleeding. The sculpture was toured by Ksubi from Los Angeles to The Burning Man Festival in Nevada and then across country to New York.

== Musical side projects ==
2006 also saw Ksubi collaborating with record label !K7. Single, under the name DJ Dangerous Dan, mixed a CD under the Ksubi banner for a national and international release of !K7 "KSUBI presents DJ KICKS CD for !K7 RECORDS".

Dan Single, or Dangerous Dan, is also part of prominent Sydney-based DJ six-piece "Bang Gang". Bang Gang consists of Ajax, Nolan, Jamie Doom, Gus Da Hoodrat, Dj Damage, and Dangerous Dan. Their early party days in dark nightclubs, such as 3rd Class in Melbourne and progressed to supporting Daft Punk in their Nevereverland tour of Australia in late 2007.

== Contemporary culture ==
Ksubi's impact on pop culture can be seen in numerous musical references including "Leaving Los Feliz" by Mark Ronson from the 2015 album Uptown Special as well as the song "Lord" by A$AP Ferg featuring Bone Thugs-n-Harmony from the 2013 Trap Lord.

Ksubi in songs

- Playboi Carti - "Let It Go"
- A$AP Ferg - "Chinatown"
- Keith Ape - "Ksubi"
- Danny Brown - "#HottestMC"
- Lil Uzi Vert - "Smoke My Dope"
- XXXTENTACION - "Look At Me!"
- Smoove L - "Apollo"
- BLP Kosher - "Skidoo"
- Skepta - "It Ain't Safe"
