= East Gordon =

- Suburb
- Country: Australia
- State: New South Wales
- City: Sydney

East Gordon is a locality in the suburb of Gordon, a suburb of Sydney, in the state of New South Wales, Australia. It is located 13 kilometres north-west of the Sydney Central Business District in the local government area of Ku-ring-gai Council.

Sydney's largest flying fox colony is located in a ravine in East Gordon.
