= General Pants Co. =

Australian clothing store chain

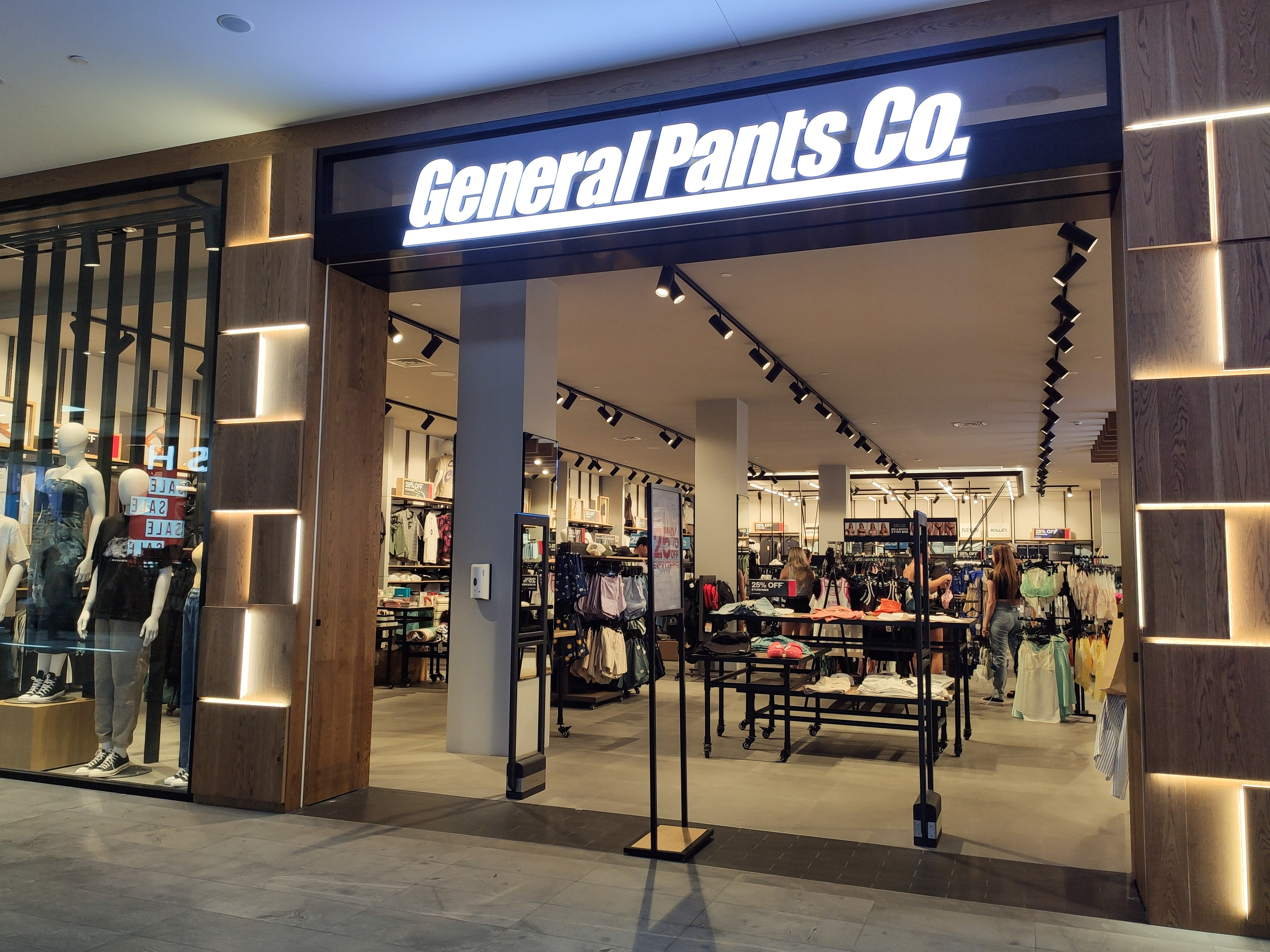
- General Pants Co. store in Karrinyup Shopping Centre
- Type: Subsidiary
- Industry: Fashion retail
- Founded: 20 April 1982
- Headquarters: Sydney, Australia
- Number of locations: 35 (2026)
- Products: Clothing, footwear, eyewear, accessories
- Parent: Alquemie Group
- Website: www.generalpants.com.au

General Pants Co. (also known as "General Pants") is an Australian fashion retailer. The company specialises in streetwear, denim, skate clothing and surfwear from international and local brands. As of November 2026, the company operates 35 stores across Australia and New Zealand.

== History ==
General Pants Company was originally conceived and started by Tom and Bronwyn Tsipris on 20 April 1972. They opened their first store on George Street Wynyard, Sydney and grew the chain to 20 stores throughout the Sydney metropolitan and regional areas.

In addition to General Pants, they purchased the Surf Dive ‘n' Ski (NSW) chain in 1979 which they expanded and ran in conjunction with the General Pants stores.

In 1995 they sold the General Pants business to the Smorgon Group. The Surf Dive’n Ski stores were later sold to the Smorgon / Jetty Surf Group in 2005, and were later sold to Billabong. The international company acquired the retail stores, numbering 38 at the time of sale, for "$35 to $45 million" on 1 November 2010—two licensed Billabong stores were also included as part of the sale.

In May 2022, Alquemie Group purchased General Pants from the Victor Smorgon Group for over $60 million, with the number of stores reaching 60.

On 19 November 2026, after a period of store closures leading to a decrease in location numbers, General Pants entered into voluntary administration with Alvarez and Marsal being appointed administrators. All stores currently remain open for the foreseeable future before a creditors' meeting on 30 November.

== Major Label ==
The brand entered into a partnership with the Peer Group Media company in 2010 to launch the Major Label music initiative. As of April 2013, Major Label is a record label that is wholly owned by General Pants Co., and allows artists to maintain ownership of copyright, retain full creative control and receive all of the royalty income that is generated through digital music sales. The label only releases singles and the staff of General Pants Co. act as the label's talent scouts and promoters—artists have been invited to submit their demo recordings at General Pants Co. retail store locations. Guineafowl, Circle Pit and High Highs were the first three acts that signed deals with the label, and Sydney band Buzz Kull were chosen in the May–June 2013 period.

== Controversy ==
In 2011, the company published a racy poster advertisement depicting a scantily clad woman with another person's hands unzipping her pants. The Australian Advertising Standards Bureau logged 37 complaints about the advertisement. The company later censored the posters after consumer complaints, covering parts of the posters. Also during this time, the company was criticised for forcing its store employees to wear badges stating "I love sex" and for using naked mannequins in its stores. After consumer complaints, the company covered the mannequins in their stores, but continued to have employees wear the "I love sex" badges. Some female store employees expressed disapproval of being made to wear the badges, with one referring to it as "inappropriate", and another stating that she felt "uncomfortable" wearing the badge, finding it "embarrassing" and "demeaning".
