= Killara High School =

School in East Killara, New South Wales, Australia

Location
- Koola Avenue, East Killara, New South Wales; Australia; 33°45′23″S 151°10′26″E

Information
- Type: Public, co-educational, day school
- Motto: Latin: Conserva Progredere (The preservation of the best of the past and continued development into the future)
- Established: 1968
- Sister school: Ehime Prefectural Mishima High School, Japan
- Principal: Ingrid Kodrin
- Teaching staff: ~110
- Grades: 7–12
- Enrolment: ~1580
- Campus: Urban (Ku-ring-gai, Sydney)
- Colours: Bottle green and yellow
- Slogan: A great school close to home
- Website: killara-h.schools.nsw.gov.au

Killara High School is a coeducational public secondary school. Located on Koola Avenue in East Killara, New South Wales, Australia. Established in 1968, Killara High School is one of the highest performing comprehensive non-selective public schools in the state. The success of the school in the Higher School Certificate (HSC) and its reputation as a school with an extensive program of curriculum enrichment make the school highly desirable. Activities such as music, art, dance, drama, debating, sport and strong participation in the Duke of Edinburgh's Award Scheme are included in the co-curricular program. Enrolment rose 21% from 2002 to a population of 1400 students in 2009. It now has 1580 students (2016). Currently, accepted catchment areas include Roseville, Lindfield, East Lindfield, West Killara, Killara, East Killara, West Gordon and East Gordon.

== History ==
Killara High began construction in 1968 and was completed in 1970. The school facilitated the growing demands of the community in the newly created East Killara. Most of the students who went to Killara in the first years were the eldest in their family, as those with older siblings went to their school, rather than the newly built Killara.

In the 1980s, Killara High purchased a house occupying a corner of the school area, which later became the language centre, commonly referred to as "The House". The House has since been demolished making way for a new block of classrooms.

== Crest and motto ==
The name: "Killara, an Aboriginal word meaning permanent"

The castle: A permanent place, shelter and reassurance, a means of maintaining that which is worthy of preservation, a storehouse of knowledge

The key: It is a symbol of progression, which opens doors of learning. It is also an emblem of growth and development into adulthood

The escutcheon: Provide protection, a pivoted keyhole cover

The motto: Latin: Conserva Progredere, symbolises preservation of the best of the past and continued development into the future

== Principal ==
Dr Mark Carter, a local boy and former student of the school, was the principal from 2002 until 2013. He won the state school regional principal of the year award in 2005. As a child, he attended Gordon East PS. In September 2013 he was promoted to Director, Public Schools with the Department of Education. Deputy Principal Judith Paszek served as Acting Principal until April 2014.

In Term 2 2014, Ms Jane Dennett was appointed as the new principal. She was previously a teacher in the HSIE Faculty at Killara, but had more recently served as Deputy Principal at Pennant Hills High School.

In Term 3 2021, when Jane Dennett left Killara, Mr Robin Chand was appointed as the new principal. He was previously a teacher and a Deputy Principal in the HSIE Faculty at Killara, but had more recently served as Acting Principal.

At the end of Term 1 2025, when Robin Chand left Killara, David Browne had been the Relieving Principal for Terms 2 and 3 2025 until Ingrid Koodrin was appointed as the new Principal.

== Campus ==
Killara High School is set on 3.8 hectares of prime bushland, half the area allocated to a typical high school in the region. The school comprises seven blocks, (A, B, C, D, E, G and K) with the school canteen located in C block, and the library in E block. Each block contains around the same number of classrooms (12 to 18) as found at other North Shore public high schools. The school's Lion Library is named after North Sydney Technical High School's library. When NSTHS closed in 1969, the contents of their library formed the beginning of the new KHS collection. Other facilities include the Kerrabee Centre, which comprises a large hall capable of seating more than 1000 people and a 250-seat performance theatre with state-of-the-art sound and lighting, a small oval named jubilee, four multi-purpose courts, a large quadrangle, and a small residential buildings called the house, which has since been demolished to build a new block (Block K). Koola Oval across the road is often used for sport and PE classes, and it can be used by students during some lunch breaks.

Capital works since 2003 have resulted in the installation of security fencing, and five COLAs (Covered Outdoor Learning Areas) built around the school, grounds enhancements, upgrades to science laboratories, classrooms and the construction of studios above the canteen. With enrollment rising at the school, the number of demountable classrooms increased from four to eighteen, with an extra two demountable bathroom blocks also put in. These demountable classrooms and bathrooms have been removed to enlarge jubilee oval. Following a period of intensive work by the school and its Parents & Citizens Association, money was allocated in the 2012 NSW Budget to construct a new building at the school. G block opened in 2014, containing specialist technology and art rooms, and a number of general learning spaces. This has reduced the number of demountable classrooms to six.

== Curriculum ==
=== Achievements ===
The school has consistently ranked among the highest performers in the NSW Higher School Certificate. In 2015 14 Killara High School students were placed on the All Rounders List for achieving the top band (Band 6) in ten or more units of study. 32% of the cohort received an ATAR above 90. Killara High remains one of the highest performing public comprehensive high schools in the Sydney Morning Herald's ranking list. In 2015, Killara was ranked 55th in the HSC ranking list in NSW. In 2014 the school had been ranked 64th.

=== Faculties ===
Teaching at Killara High School is divided amongst 10 curriculum departments, each teaching a variety of related Board of Studies endorsed subjects. The departments are:

- English (including ESL and Drama)
- Mathematics
- Science
- Languages (LOTE) including Chinese, French, German, Hebrew and Japanese
- Human Society & its Environment (Green) including Commerce, Business Studies, Economics, Aboriginal Studies and Geography
- Human Society & its Environment (Blue) including History and Legal Studies
- Creative and Performing Arts (CAPA) including Music and Visual Arts
- Technological and Applied Studies, including Engineering Studies, Design & Technology, Industrial Technology, Food Technology, Textiles & Design and Hospitality
- Personal Development, Health and Physical Education (PDHPE)
- Computing Studies & IT

== Curriculum enrichment activities ==
=== Sport ===
Students in Years 7 and 8 at Killara High participate in an integrated sport program coordinated and taught by PDHPE staff, and compete in a number of Sport Gala Days with other schools.

Senior students from Years 9 to 11 also participate in sport throughout the year. These years participate in the Ku-ring-gai Zone Secondary School Sports against other schools. This is known as grade sport, or students may choose a recreational sport. These events are held on Thursday afternoons

The School also holds various carnivals during the year this includes:

- Swimming Carnival
- Athletics Carnival
- Cross Country Carnival

Students may also compete in the Combined High Schools (CHS) competition in various sports throughout the year

=== Specialist wellbeing programs and camps ===
- Year 7 – Year 7 Orientation Camp with Year 11 Peer Support Leaders running the program "DOB" (Don't Obey Bullies)
- Year 8 – Resolution the Solution: a whole day program focusing on strategies for managing conflict
- Year 9 – Year 9 Camp at Stanwell Tops: running the program Talking Tolerance, focusing on acceptance of difference, generalising and stereotyping
- Year 10 – It's Your Life and It's Your Training. This includes goal setting, motivation, skills development, personal defence, communication, student leadership training and peer support training. Year 10 also participate in work experience and service learning.
- Year 11 – Jindabyne Camp, where the Crossroads program, focusing on personal challenges, teamwork, personal development, independence as well as discussions of issues related to drug and alcohol use is run.

The school is a participant in the Australian Government MindMatters program, which focuses on wellbeing and mental health.

=== Student leadership ===
Killara High School offers many opportunities for students to engage in leadership within the school. There are currently seven leadership groups in the school, with more than 115 students engaged in improving the school and providing opportunities for the students. These include:

- The Arts Council – Students elected by peers to promote the Arts within the school.
- The Sports Council – Students elected by peers to promote sporting activities within the school.
- Light & Sound Team – A small number of students in Years 7 to 10 who provide technical support and design for assemblies & performances. The team is self-nominated. It is coordinated by Tim Collins in the CAPA faculty.
- The Student Representative Council (SRC) – A peer-elected group of students from all years who liaise with teachers and the principal to represent their year group and help their school through by introducing new facilities (such as cooled bubblers and new seating) and improving old facilities. They also hold activities as mufti days and barbecues, as well as hosting a variety of pizza based polls on their website.
- The Social Justice Committee (SJC) – A student body with representatives from all years elected to be the "conscience" of the school. They engage in awareness campaigns and charity fundraising. Recently, the committee has been involved in raising funds for The Leukaemia Foundation, by running The World's Greatest Shave (Raising nearly $20,000 in 2019), Canteen, a charity supporting children facing cancer by selling bandanas and The Salvation Army by collecting non perishable edible items from home groups for people who can't afford them. The SJC has raised awareness for causes such as International Women's Day, International Men's Day, and Earth Hour.
- Prefects – A peer–elected group of Year 11 students who liaise with teachers and the principal as well as being involved in their signature charities such as the Red Cross Appeal and The Westmead Children's Hospital Teddy Bear's Picnic. Prefects represent the school at a number of events.
- Student Leaders Council – Is a group comprising two representatives from each Council, and the School Captains, who chair the meetings. Its role is to organise the groups and provide a body for inter-council activities.

=== Student exchange ===
Many Killara High School Students in various Years participate in the Rotary Youth Exchange Australia, sending them to many parts of the world.

=== Enrichment and other ===
- Annual yearbook production: The Green Years magazine
- Creative and Performing Arts
- Debating
- Duke of Edinburgh's Award Scheme
- Public speaking
- Law Society Mock Trial
- Model United Nations Australia (MUNA)
- Drawing Club
- Textiles Club
- TAG (Talk About God) Christian group
- Shabbat Club, run by NSW Board of Jewish Education
- Social Inc.
- Coding Club
- Interact Club

== Staff ==
As a large school, Killara High has a wide range of specialist executive staff. There are three Deputy Principals, who are supported by three Stage Head Teachers, who each look after a Stage or two academic years. There is also a Head Teacher Wellbeing, Head Teacher Administration, and Head Teacher Secondary Studies.

The school has a Careers Adviser and two teacher-librarians.

Killara High School is structured on a Home Group system, where each student is allocated to a Home Group teacher, who remains with them as they progress through to Year 12. The Home Groups were introduced as a way to ensure that every student had an ongoing connection with a teacher. Year 12 students have access to a staff mentor, chosen by themselves.

== Parents and Citizens Association ==
Killara High School has an active Parents and Citizens Association that contributes to the life of the school and the opportunities that are offered to students. Meetings are scheduled for 7:00 pm on the third Wednesday of every month, except where this clashes with vacations or school activities.

== Performing Arts Enrichment Program ==
=== Drama ===
A Drama Ensemble meets after school and performs a production for an audience.

Each year either a musical or a MADD (Music, Dance, Drama) Festival is produced. In 2014 High School Musical was produced and MADD will be a feature of Term 2 2016.

=== Dance ===
Killara High School's various dance groups have performed at the Sydney North Dance Festival, State Dance Festival, Schools Spectacular, MacDonald Performing Arts Challenge, Rock Eisteddfod and at the opening and closing ceremonies of the Pacific School Games and Olympic Games.

- Dance Groups
  - Intermediate Dance Group
  - Junior A Dance Group
  - Junior B Dance Group

=== Music ===
- Concert Bands
  - Concert Bands One and Two
- Stage Band
  - Stage Bands One and Two
- String Ensemble
- Orchestra
- Choir

== School traditions ==
There are four houses at Killara High School. These houses are named after Aboriginal words, since the area in which the school sits in Ku-ring-gai is steeped in Aboriginal tradition. The houses are:

- Kimba (Fire): Red House
- Caringa (Light): Yellow House
- Mundara (Thunder): Green House
- Doongara (Lightning): Blue House

There is also an honours system at Killara High School where students collect honour points from participating in extracurricular activities and completing excellent work in class.

The more points you earn the higher in the system you go, the ranks are as follows in ascending order:

- Letter of Merit
- Inscription in Honour Book
- Honour badge
- Honour Pennant can be attained from getting at least 4 Honour Badges
- Honour Blue can be attained from gaining Honour Badges for all 6 years at Killara High School.

Each year Year 12 students are farewelled at a formal dinner with their families, called Ekuba. Traditionally, the Year 12 video, made by students, is a highlight of this evening.

An annual award ceremony is held to acknowledge the sporting and academic achievements of the students at the school.

== Enrolment ==
Enrolment at Killara High School has, since 2002, increased 21 percent making it one of the three largest government schools in the State. Local enrolment in Year 7 comprises 87 per cent of the cohort—up from 58 per cent in 2003—in an area with a number of selective and private schools.

The school has an enrolment policy which involves an area-inclusive zone. Suburbs in the inclusive zone include Killara, East Killara, West Killara, Lindfield, East Lindfield, Gordon, West Gordon, East Gordon, and parts of Roseville. A detailed map of the local enrolment area and street names can be found on the school website.

Parents are also entitled to apply for enrolment of their children at Killara High School if they reside outside the designated local enrolment area but due to the high enrolment numbers, non-local enrolment is difficult as the school is currently at full capacity. The NSW Board of Jewish Education runs Hebrew classes at the school and the school accepts students out of the local enrolment area who have studied Hebrew prior to coming to the school.

== Networks ==
Killara High School belongs to the Killara Schools Partnership (KSP) and the North Shore 5 (NS5).

The KSP consists of KHS and its partner primary schools – Beaumont Road, Gordon East, Killara, Lindfield, Lindfield East and Roseville Public Schools. There is a very strong relationship between the schools, with many students participating in curriculum enrichment activities (STEM, HSIE, public speaking and debating, creative writing, technological studies, sport and creative and performing arts) within the network. Staff involvement in the Quality Teaching Rounds program is also a feature of the KSP. In 2015 a shared school development day was held at KHS, called Killara Connect. This teach meet-style event brought staff from all seven schools together to share programs.

The NS5 unites KHS with Chatswood, Ku-ring-gai, St Ives and Turramurra High Schools. A key feature of this network is the Collaboration and Innovation Program, which sees staff combine to develop new programs to enhance student learning. Annual combined school development days are held in the NS5.

In 2015 KHS became part of the City Country Alliance, which focuses on intercultural understanding. The school has had a strong link with Menindee Central School for a number of years, with regular student visits between both schools. Many students report that visiting Menindee is one of their most important experiences of their secondary school years.

== Notable alumni ==
=== Political and academic ===
- Nicolette Boele, clean energy executive and Member of the Australian Parliament for Bradfield
- Ian Ramsay, law professor at Melbourne University
- Susan Templeman, Member of the Australian Parliament for Macquarie

=== Entertainment and the arts ===
- Bernard Cohen, author
- Elle Macpherson, model
- Lenka, singer-songwriter and actress
- Bella Ferraro, The X Factor contestant
- Antonella Gambotto, author, scriptwriter and journalist
- Debbie Kruger, journalist and writer
- Lior, singer and songwriter
- Peta Murray, playwright

=== Sports ===
- Mariafe Artacho del Solar, beach volleyball player, 2020 Summer Olympics silver medallist
- Andrew Blades, former Wallabies prop
- Nicole Laird, beach volleyball player
- Anton Smirnov, chess Grandmaster, currently highest-ranked chess player in Australia

== See also ==
- List of Government schools in New South Wales
