= Their Brilliant Careers =

2016 short story collection by Australian author Ryan O'Neill

- Author: Ryan O'Neill
- Language: English
- Genre: Short story collection
- Publisher: Black Inc
- Publication date: 1 August 2016
- Publication place: Australia
- Media type: Print
- Pages: 240 pp.
- Awards: 2017 Prime Minister's Literary Awards — Fiction, winner
- ISBN: 9781863958639

Their Brilliant Careers: The Fantastic Lives of Sixteen Extraordinary Australian Writers is a 2016 Australian work of fiction by Ryan O'Neill. The work comprises a collection of intertwined short stories, and won the 2017 Prime Minister's Literary Awards for Fiction.

== Synopsis ==
This work of fiction consists of 16 interconnected short stories, each of which is a biography of a different fictional Australian writer. According to writer Scott Robinson, the books subjects are based on a mix of both local and international writers. The first, Rand Washington, is seen by Robinson as "a frothing, toxic mix of L. Ron Hubbard, H. P. Lovecraft, and Ayn Rand". Another character, historian Edward Gayle, reflects the views of Keith Windschuttle and Geoffrey Blainey, whose work represents some of the arguments in the Australian history wars, in contrast to the views of Henry Reynolds.

== Contents ==
- "Rand Washington (1919-2000)"
- "Matilda Young (1899-1975)"
- "Arthur Ruhtra (1940-1981)"
- "Addison Tiller (1874-1929)"
- "Robert Bush (1941-1990)"
- "Dame Claudia Gunn (1885-1975)"
- "Francis X McVeigh (1900-1948?)"
- "Rachel Deverall (1969-2016)"
- "Catherine Swan (1921-1970)"
- "Frederick Stratford (1880-1933)"
- "Edward Gayle (1928-2008)"
- "Vivian Darkbloom (1901-1976)"
- "Helen Harkaway (1940-1993)"
- "Donald Chapman (1903?-1937?)"
- "Stephen Pennington (1935-2009)"
- "Sydney Steele (1866-1945)"

== See also ==
- 2016 in Australian literature

== Notes ==
- Dedication: "For my late wife, Rachel"
- The title is inspired by Miles Franklin's My Brilliant Career.

In the acknowledgments section, O'Neill thanks Chilean writer Roberto Bolaño's Nazi Literature in the Americas (1996), which "provides essential background information for the life of Rand Washington".

== Critical reception ==
Writing in Australian Book Review, author and critic David Wright described the book as "a chocolate box of parodic Aussie portraits: some are bitter, some have gooey sentimental hearts, and some are just plain nuts". He went on to note that the book "brims with crackerjack wit" and that it "is interconnected in a way that tests believability, but so too are the real events into which its web entwines".

While reviewing each of the books on the short list for the 2017 Miles Franklin Award. writer Jen Webb pondered how close the author sails "to the wind of defamation", before commenting: "Like a supremely confident stand-up comic, he pushes the joke from initial humour through infuriating repetition to helpless laughter...Literary giant after literary giant, publisher after publisher, is kneecapped by these excoriating and hilarious accounts of the players, their work, and the impossibly interwoven lives they lead."

== Awards ==
- 2017: Winner, Prime Minister's Literary Awards — Fiction
- 2017: Shortlisted, Miles Franklin Award
- 2017: Shortlisted, New South Wales Premier's Literary Awards — Christina Stead Prize for Fiction

== Publishing history ==
After the novel's initial publication in Australia by Black Inc, it was reprinted in the UK by Lightning Books in 2018.
