= East Killara =

- Suburb
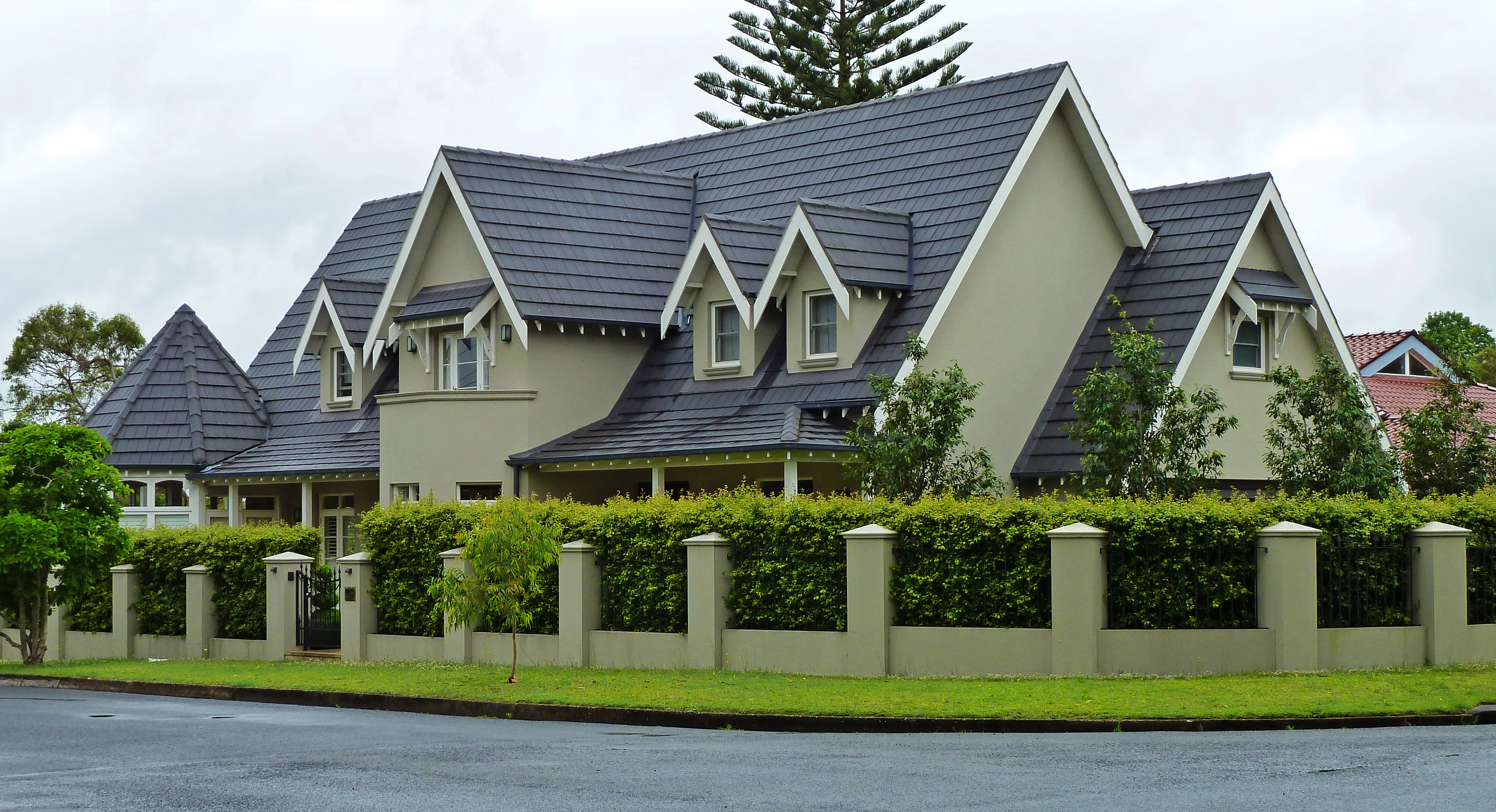
- House, 100 Springdale Road

- Interactive map of East Killara
- Country: Australia
- State: New South Wales
- City: Sydney
- LGA: Ku-ring-gai Council
- Location: 15 km (9.3 mi) NW of Sydney CBD

Government
  - State electorate: Davidson
  - Federal division: Bradfield

Area
  - Total: 3.2 km^{2} (1.2 sq mi)
- Elevation: 125 m (410 ft)

Population
  - Total: 2,895 (2021 census)
  - Density: 905/km^{2} (2,340/sq mi)
- Postcode: 2071
Suburbs around East Killara
Gordon	St Ives	Davidson
Killara	East Killara	Belrose
Lindfield	East Lindfield	Forestville

East Killara is a suburb on the Upper North Shore of Sydney in the state of New South Wales, Australia. East Killara is located 15 kilometres north of the Sydney Central Business District in the local government area of Ku-ring-gai Council. It is bordered by Garigal national park to the East and Eastern Arterial Rd/ Birdwood Ave to the west. Killara is a separate suburb to the south-west, which shares the postcode of 2071.

East Killara is set in peaceful bushland. The main road is Koola Avenue which extends from Birdwood Avenue to Albany Crescent.

== History ==
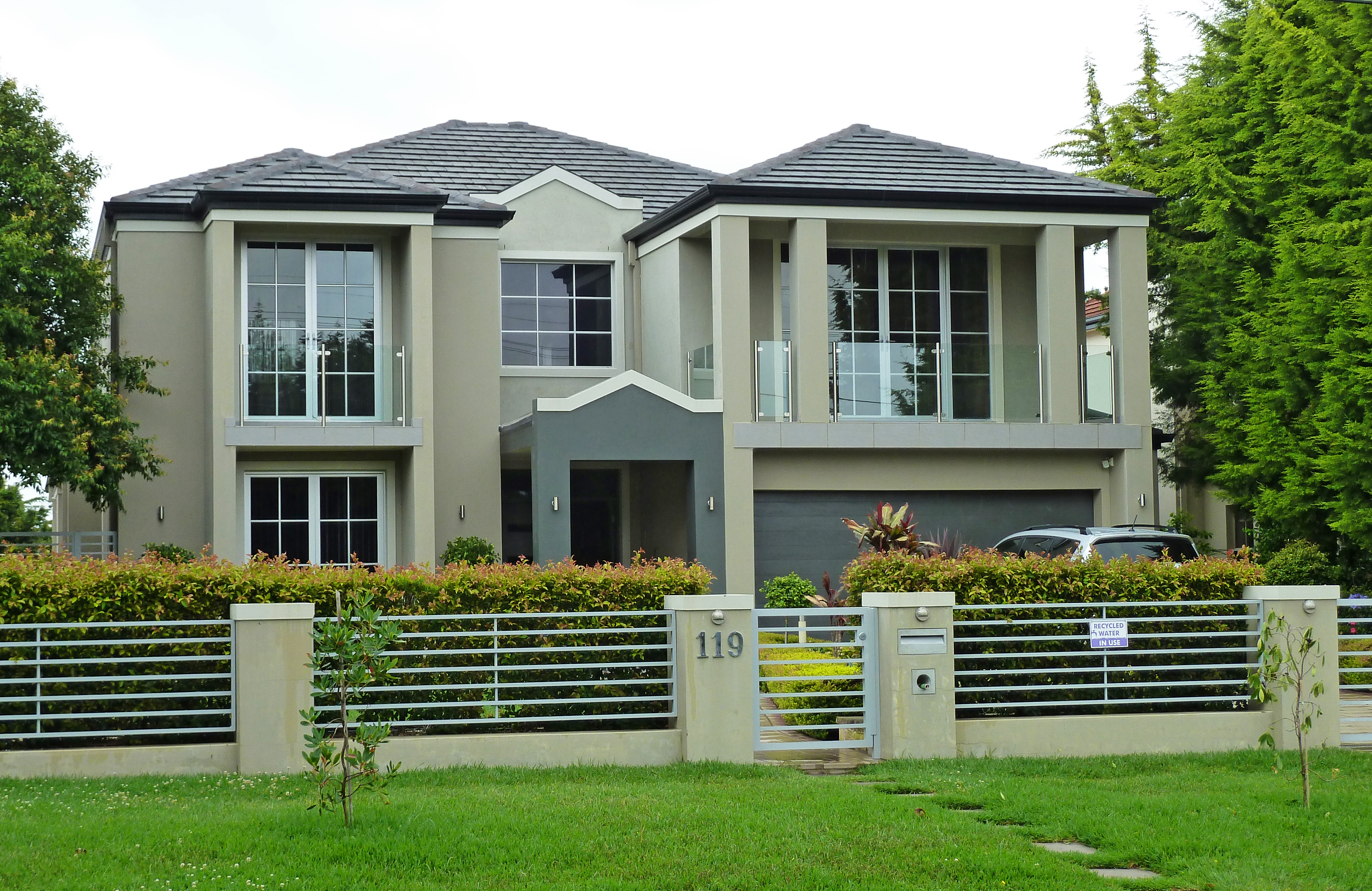
Contemporary family home, 119 Springdale Road

Killara is an Aboriginal word meaning permanent or always there.

East Killara was gazetted as a separate suburb from Killara on 5 August 1994.

== Population ==
At the 2021 census, there were 2,895 residents in East Killara. 43.1% of people were born in Australia. The next most common countries of birth were China 19.4%, Hong Kong 6.4%, England 4.3%, Malaysia 2.4%, and South Korea 2.0%. About 43.3% of people spoke only English at home, other languages spoken at home included Mandarin 21.8%, Cantonese 15.9%, Korean 2.6%, Persian (excluding Dari) 1.3%, and Japanese 1.2%. The most common responses for religion were No Religion 49.6%, Catholic 13.9%, Anglican 10.2%, and Buddhism 5.5%. East Killara residents had high incomes, with a median weekly household income of $3,005 compared to the national average of $1,746. Almost all occupied private dwellings were separate houses (99.5%). The average household size was 3.2 people.

== Commercial area ==
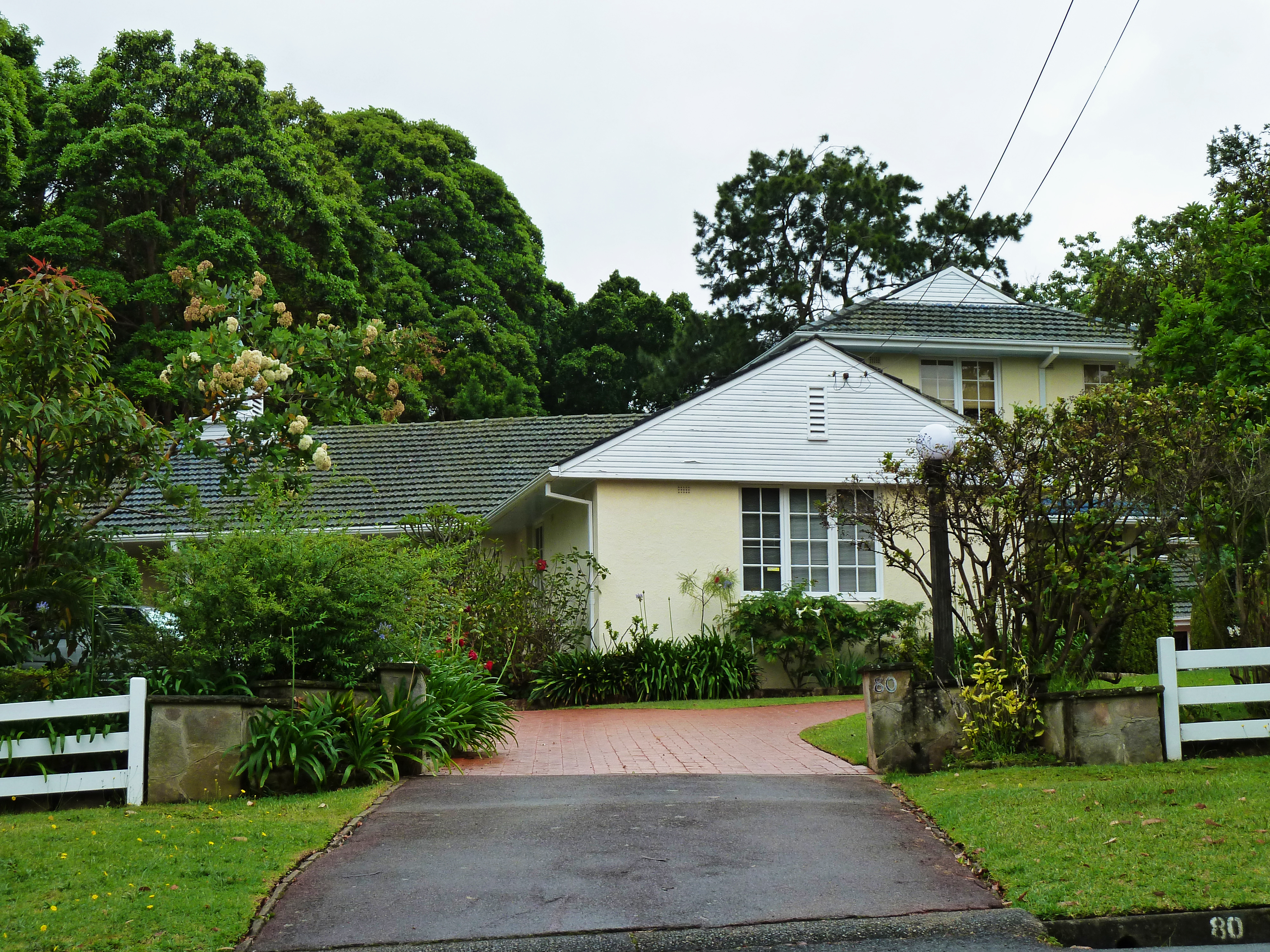
Family home on Springdale Road

There is a small shopping centre containing a bakery/supermarket, café, pharmacy, fruit market, liquor store, hairdresser, Veterinary Hospital, GP and a real estate agent.

== Schools ==
The suburb contains Killara High School, a public secondary school.
