= Killara =

- Suburb
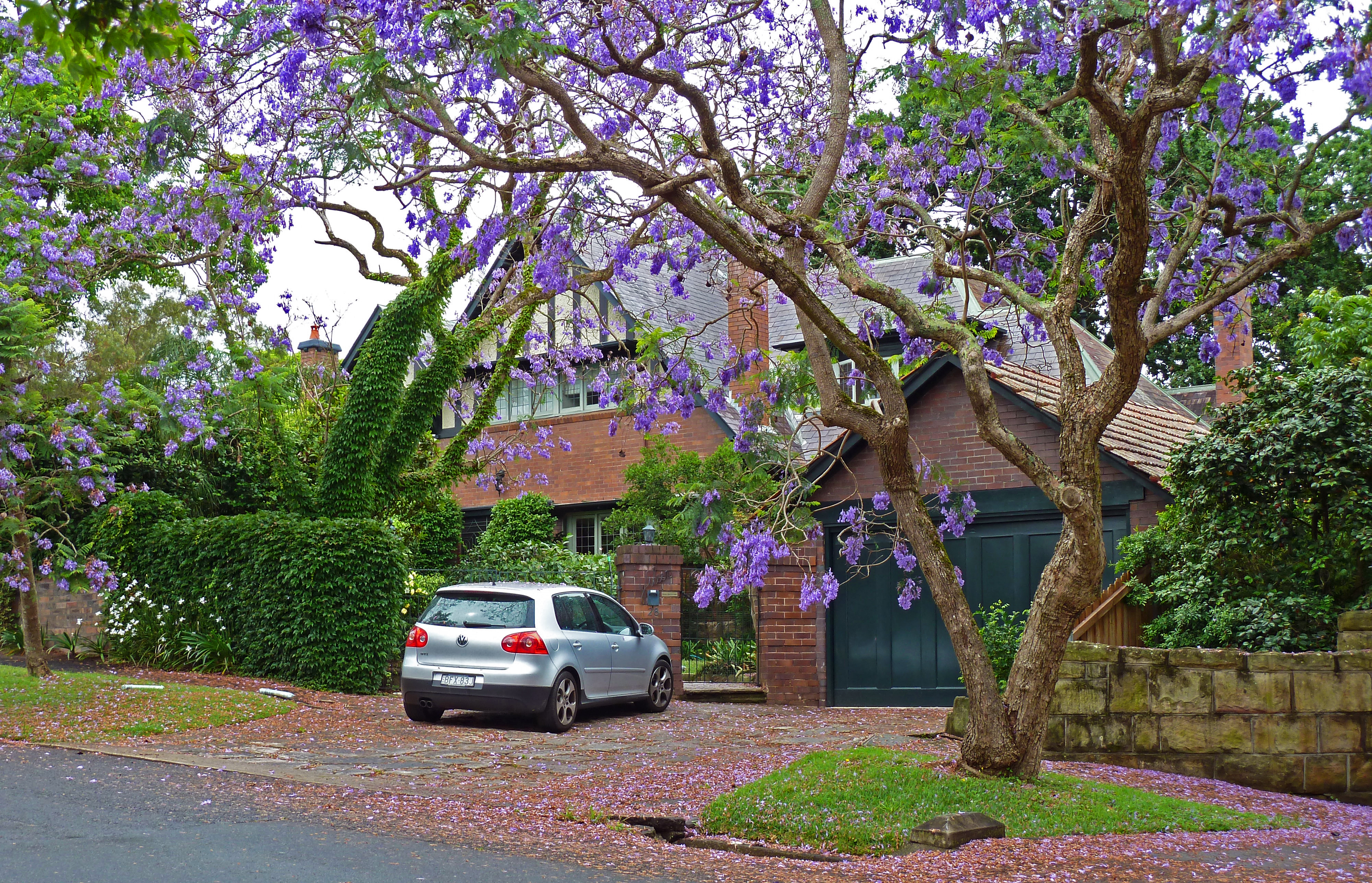
- Residential home, Springdale Road, Killara

- Interactive map of Killara
- Country: Australia
- State: New South Wales
- City: Sydney
- LGA: Ku-ring-gai Council
- Location: 14 km (8.7 mi) north-west of Sydney CBD
- Established: 1821

Government
  - State electorate: Davidson
  - Federal division: Bradfield

Area
  - Total: 4.87 km^{2} (1.88 sq mi)
- Elevation: 120 m (390 ft)

Population
  - Total: 10,620 (2021 census)
  - Density: 2,181/km^{2} (5,648/sq mi)
- Time zone: UTC+10 (AEST)
  - Summer (DST): UTC+11 (AEDT)
- Postcode: 2071
Suburbs around Killara
Gordon	Gordon	East Killara
West Pymble	Killara	East Lindfield
Macquarie Park	Lindfield	Lindfield

Killara (/kɪˈlɑːrə/) is a suburb on the Upper North Shore of Sydney in the state of New South Wales, Australia. Killara is located 14 kilometres (8.7 mi) north-west of the Sydney central business district in the local government area of Ku-ring-gai Council. East Killara is a separate suburb and West Killara is a locality within Killara.

== History ==
Killara is an Aboriginal word meaning permanent or always there. The name of the suburb was chosen when the railway line opened in 1899. James George Edwards was a representative of the people who requested a station be built here. The suburb was established as a "Gentlemen's suburb", designed so that there would be no commercial ventures in the area. For this reason, the suburb has very few shops in the original development.

Killara Post Office opened on 7 November 1904.

Killara later became the home of the architect Harry Seidler, whose home—designed by him and his wife Penelope in the 1960s—can still be seen in Kalang Avenue. It is sometimes known as Killara House and sometimes as Harry and Penelope Seidler House. The couple moved into the house on Harry Seidler's birthday in 1967. The garden contains a sculpture by the Los Angeles sculptor Eric Orr. The house is heritage-listed.

Marian Street Theatre played a significant role in the cultural life of the North Shore. The theatre was closed for renovation works from 2013, and a proposal was passed by Ku-ring-gai Council to redevelop the site into a multipurpose arts and cultural facility but ultimately did not proceed due to cost concerns following another vote on the matter by the council that will take effect from August 2026.

== Heritage listings ==
Killara has a number of heritage-listed sites, including:

- 13 Kalang Avenue: Harry and Penelope Seidler House
- 1 Werona Avenue: Woodlands, Killara

== Transport ==
Killara is home to a train station that connects to the T1 and T9 lines for routes to Berowra via Gordon, City via Gordon on the T1 or routes through North Shore via City on the T9.

The Pacific Highway is the main road thoroughfare through Killara.

CDC NSW operates two bus routes through Killara:

- 556: Lindfield to East Killara
- 565: Chatswood to Macquarie University via Roseville, Lindfield and Macquarie Park

== Development ==
The Swain Gardens were donated to Ku-ring-gai Council by Mr Swain, a Sydney bookseller, in the 1920s, and are today maintained by the council and volunteers. The gardens have been listed by the National Trust of Australia.

=== Schools ===
Killara is served by two public primary schools, Killara Public School and Beaumont Road Public School. The suburb is also home to Killara High School, one of the highest performing non-selective government secondary school in New South Wales. A short-lived private school in Killara, Abbotsholme College, counted two future prime ministers (Harold Holt and William McMahon) among its pupils.

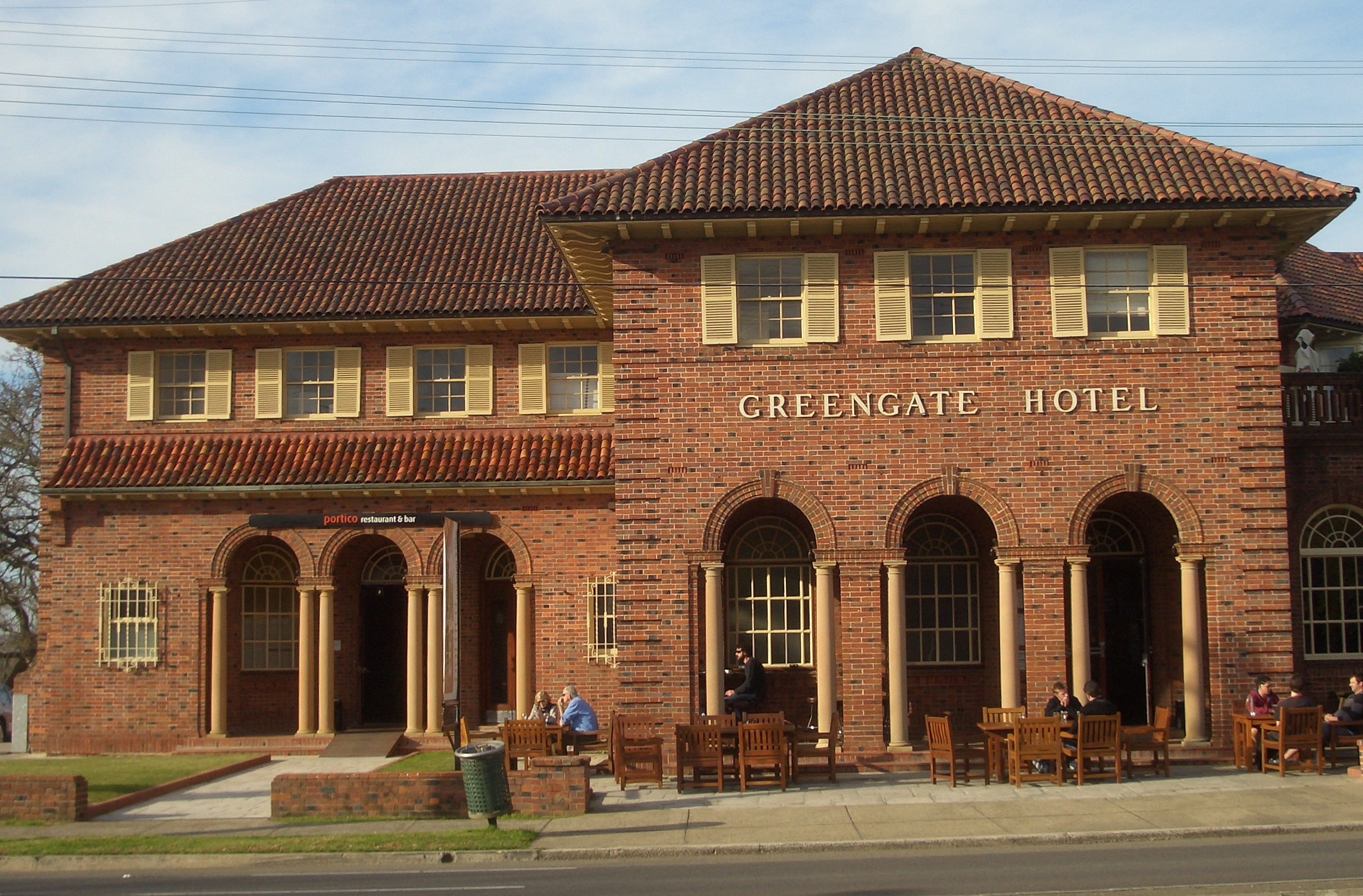
Greengate Hotel, Pacific Highway

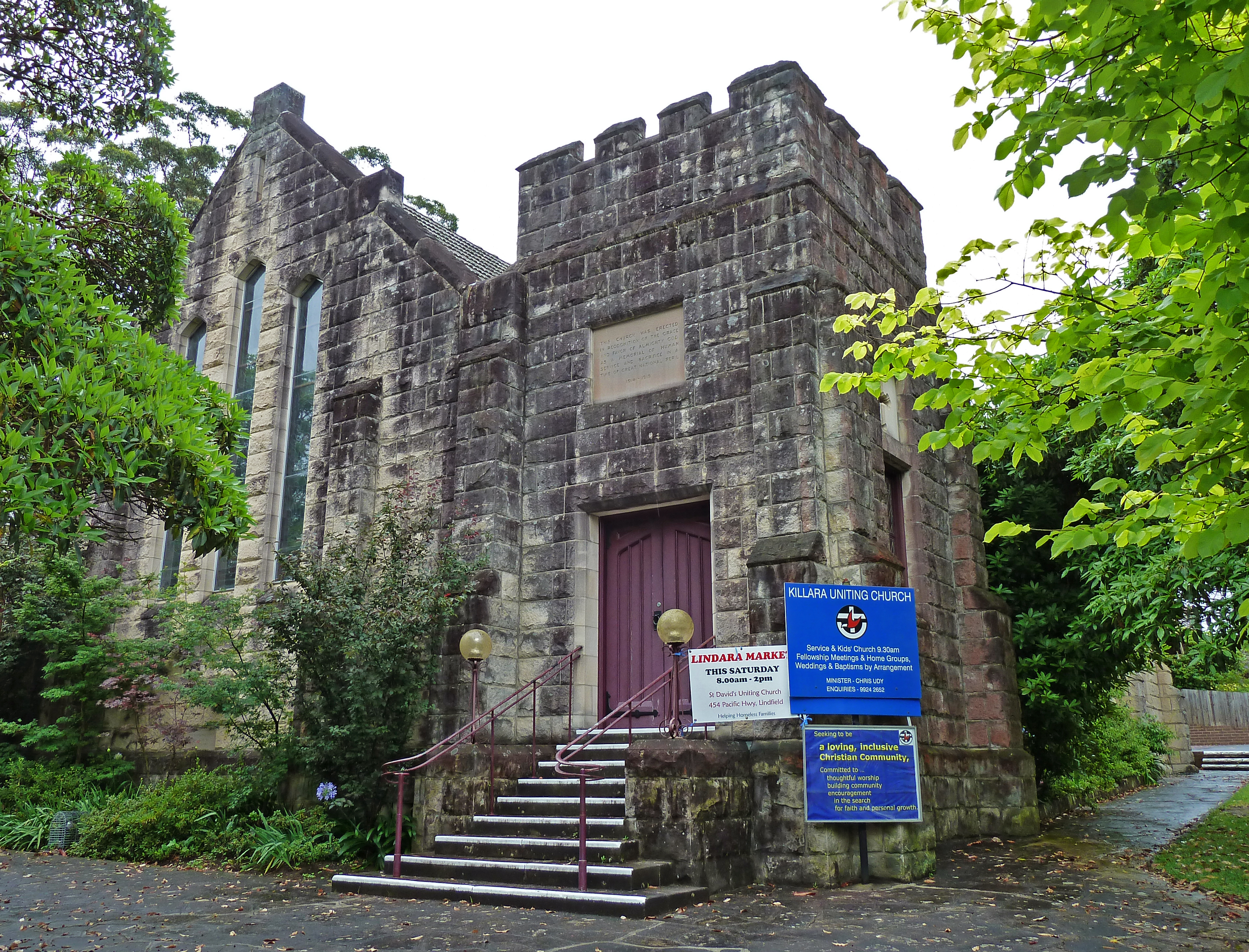
Killara Uniting Church designed by Carlyle Greenwell

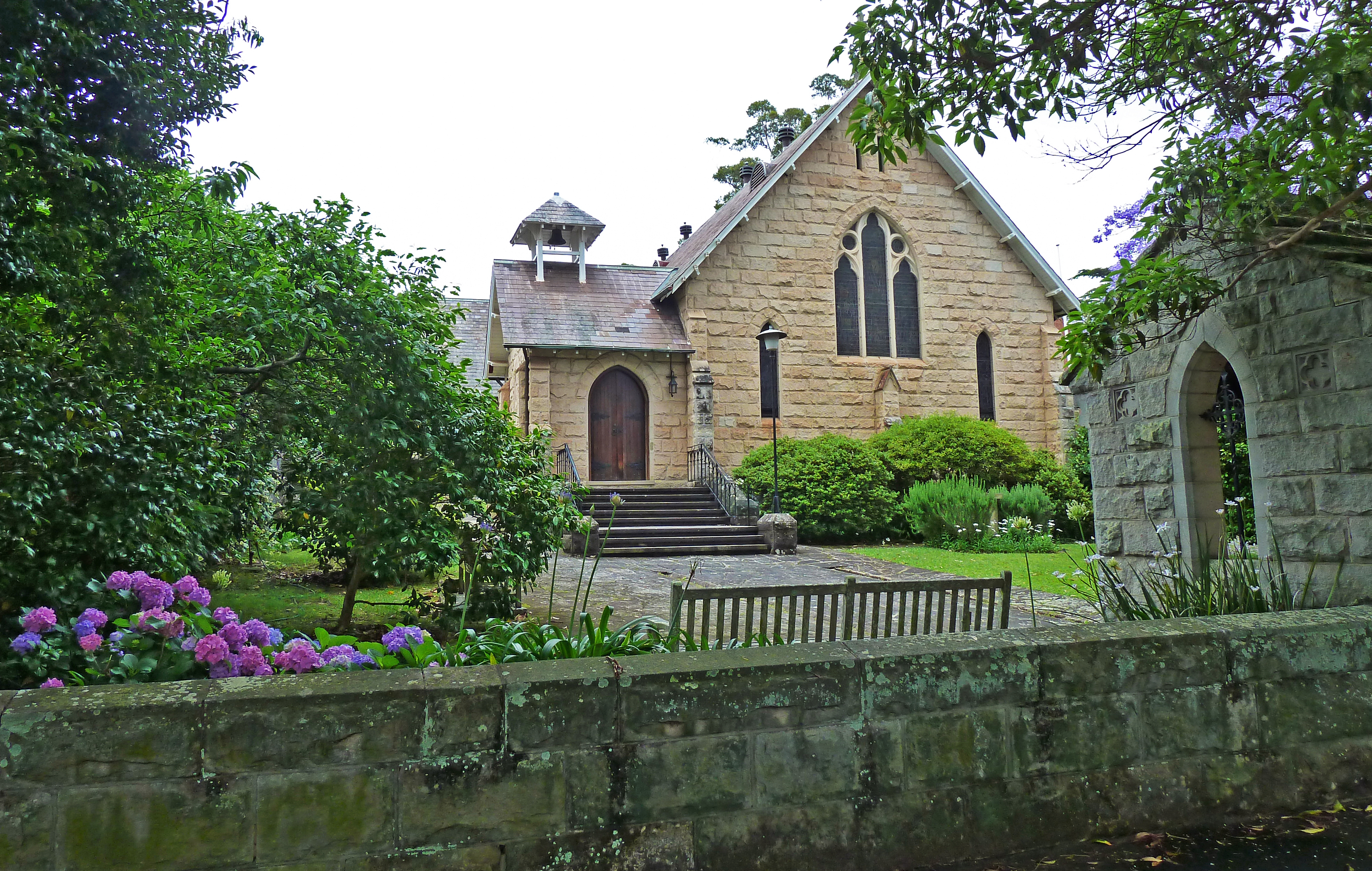
St Martin's Anglican Church

Killara is also home to some child care centres, including Handprints Pre School and Child Care.

=== Churches ===
Churches in the suburb include St Martin's Anglican Church and Killara Uniting Church (formerly Killara Congregational Church) on Karranga Avenue.

=== Clubs ===
Killara has recreational sport centres including Killara lawn tennis club and Killara golf club, which is ranked in the top 100 golf courses in Australia and picturesque views to the Blue Mountains has attracted golfers.

=== Commercial ===
Commercial developments are located along the Pacific Highway, including the Greengate Hotel, Beacon Lighting, Poolwerx, and Killara hotel. Residents usually travel to nearby suburbs of Gordon, Macquarie Park and Chatswood for regular shopping.

== Residential style ==
The majority of residential properties are built in the Federation and Californian Bungalow styles, although the suburb includes many other styles.

The Harry and Penelope Seidler House at 13 Kalang Avenue was designed by Harry and Penelope Seidler. The 1960s-era modern-design home, constructed with reinforced masonry walls, concrete floors and roof, rubble-stone retaining walls and fireplace, won the Wilkinson Award in 1967.

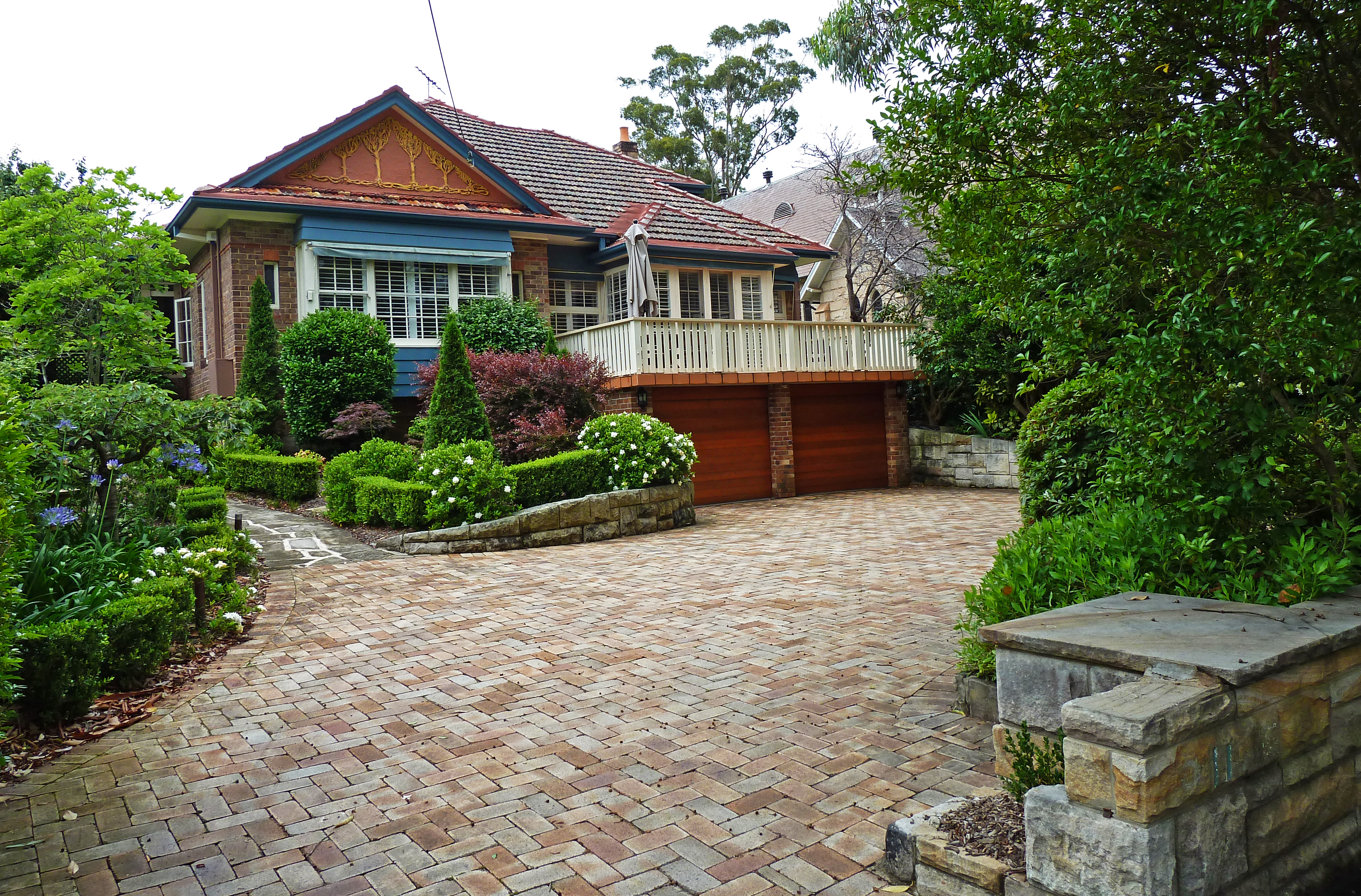
Federation house, Arnold Street

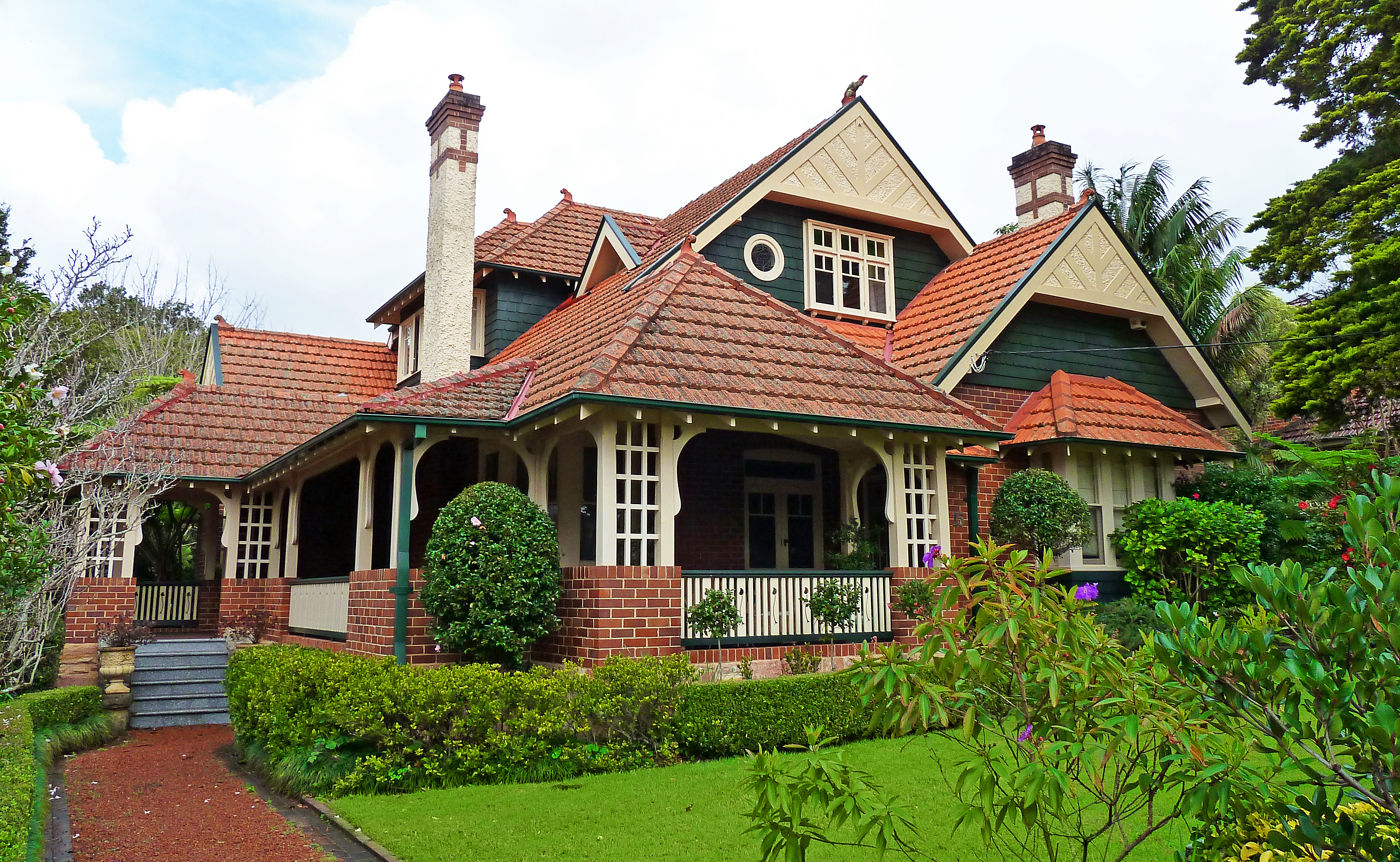
Federation bungalow, Northcote Avenue

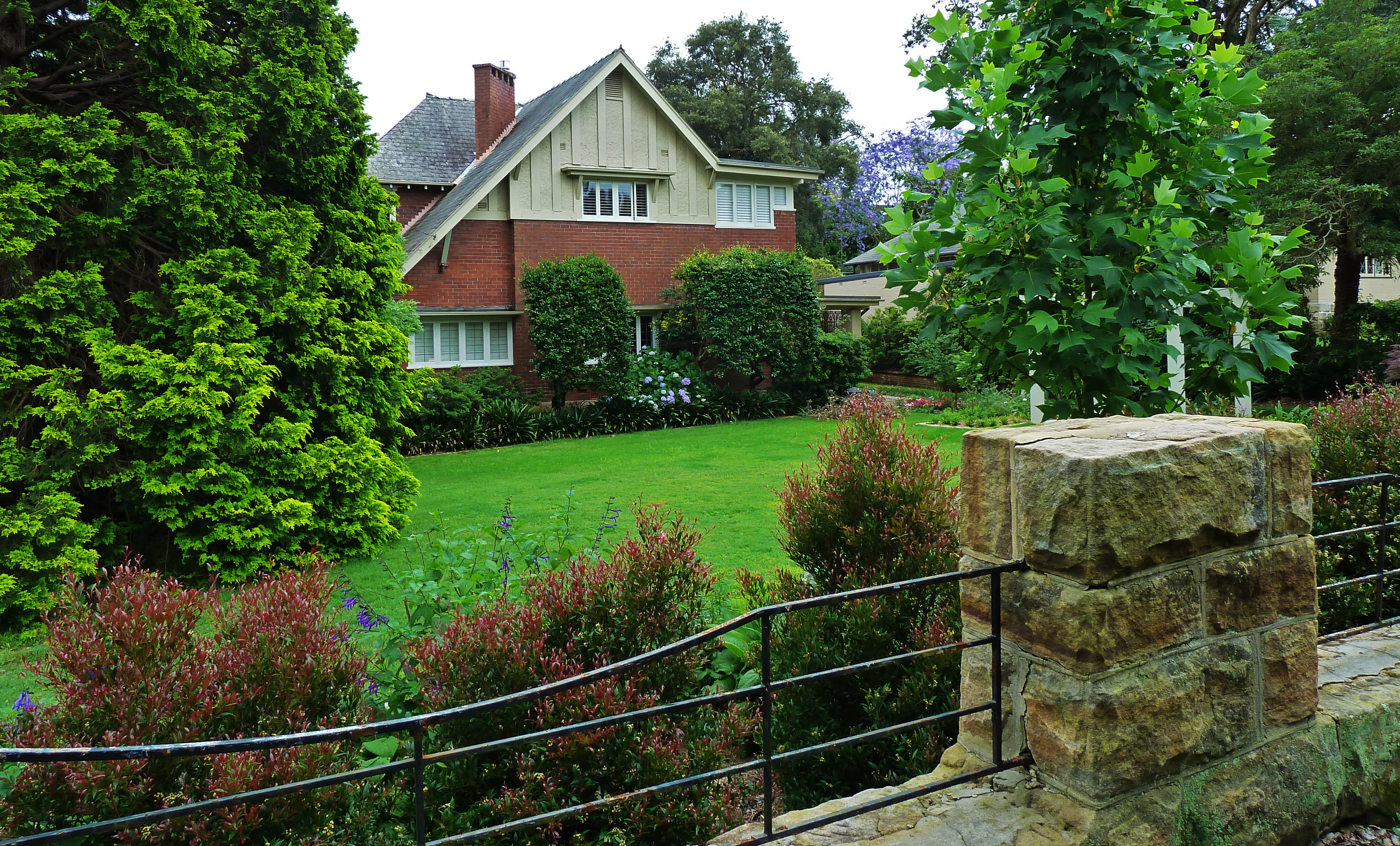
Arts and crafts house, Arnold Street

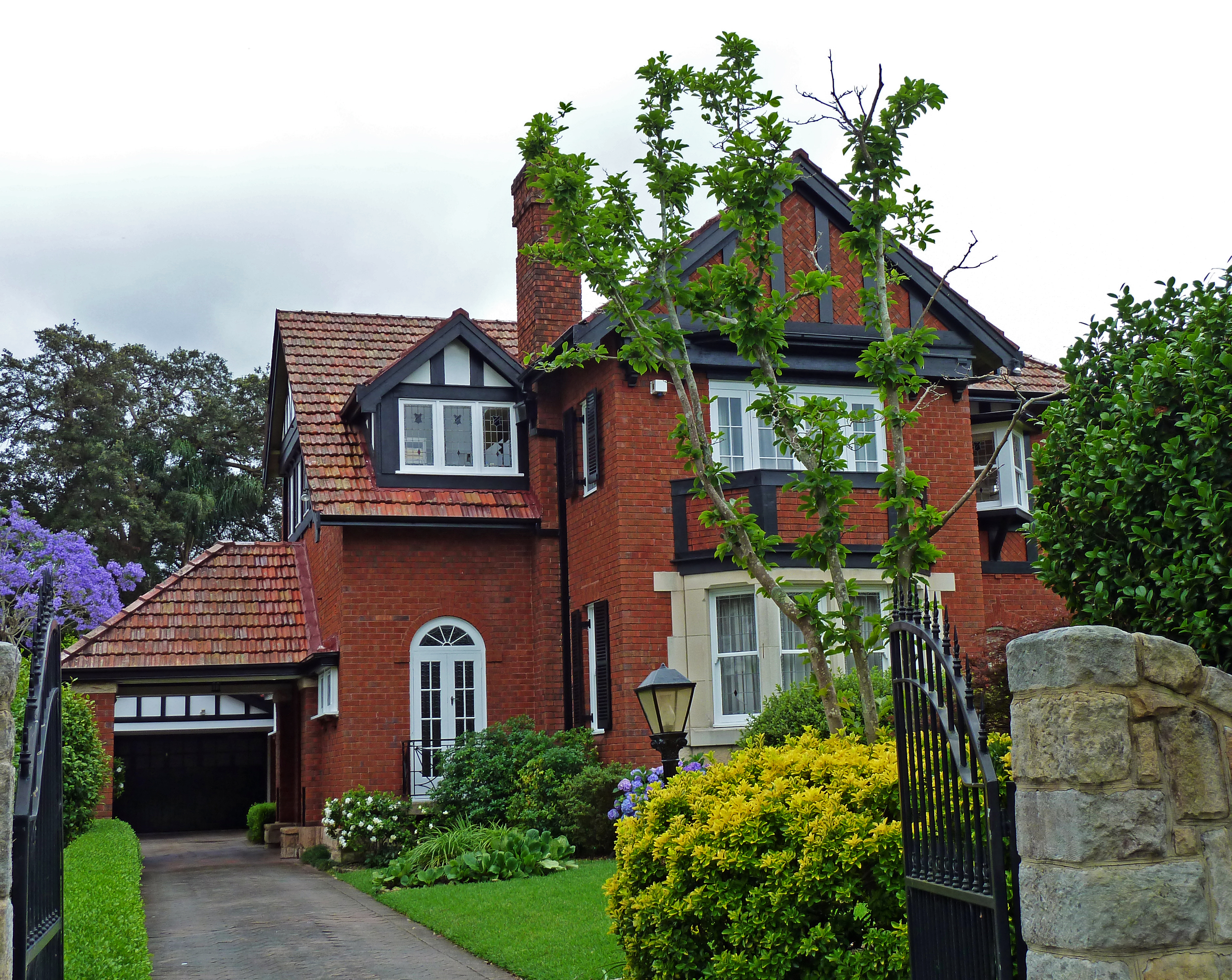
Tudor revival house, Arnold Street

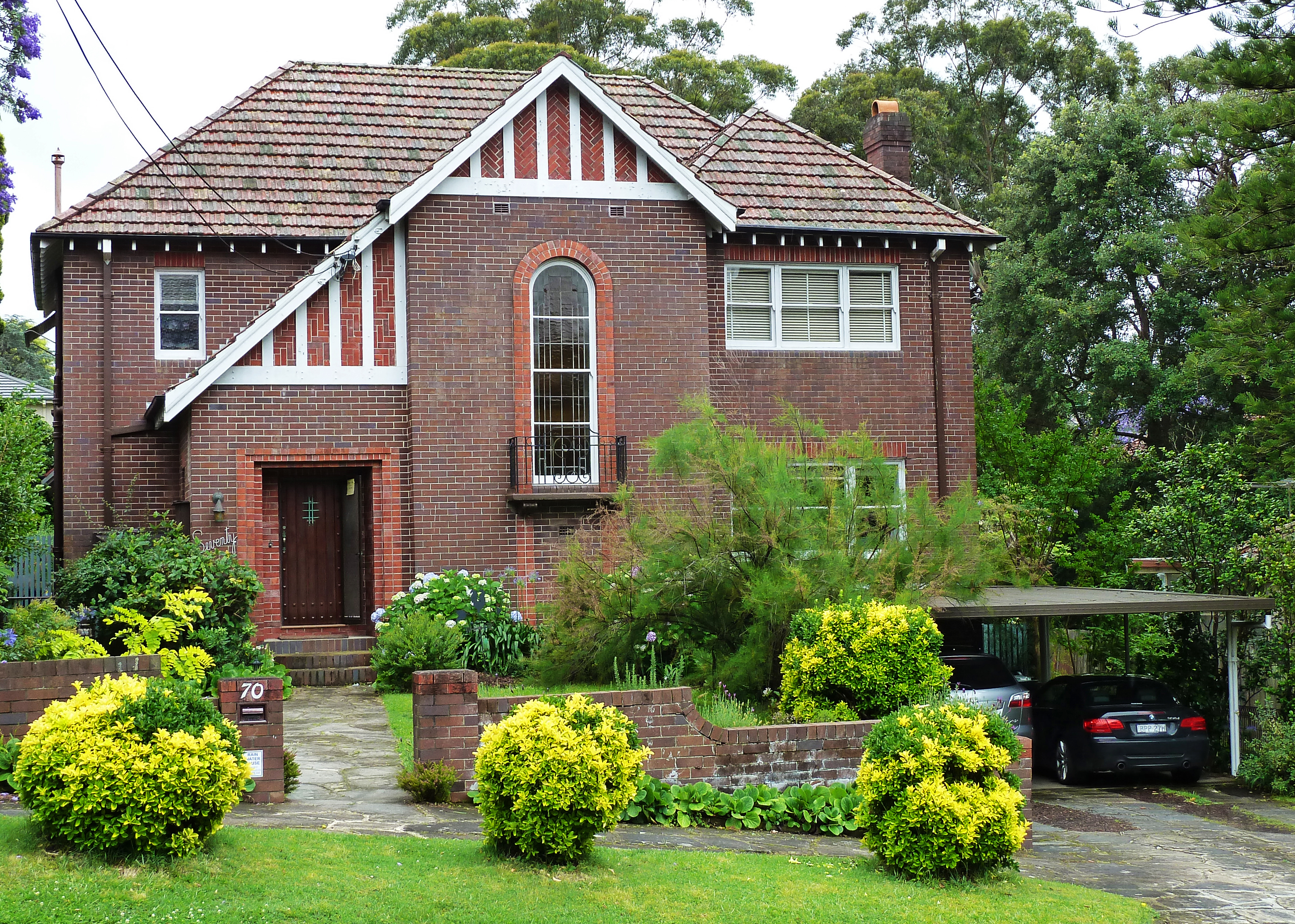
Tudor revival house, Stanhope Road

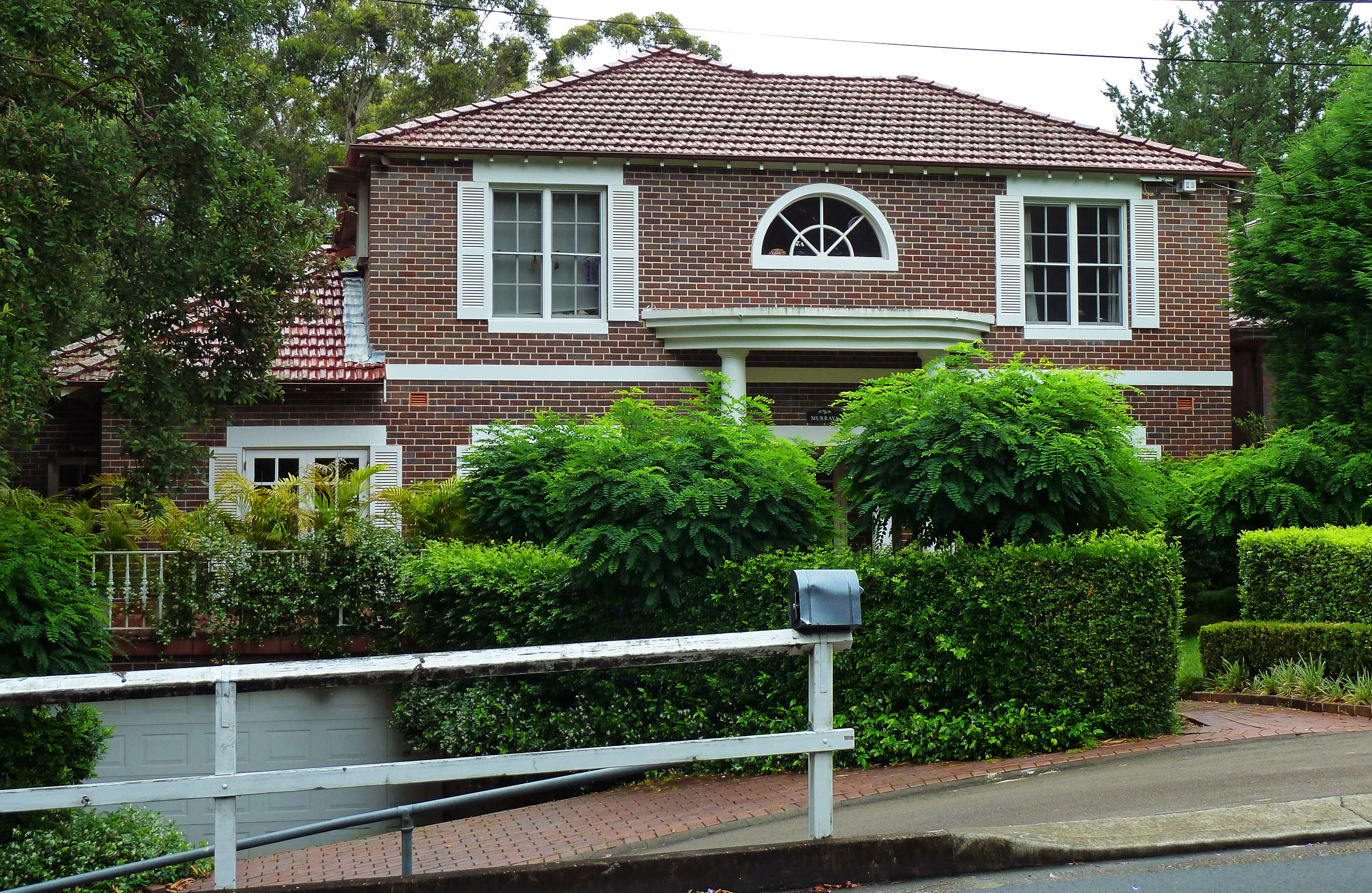
Neoclassical (post-war) house, Stanhope Road

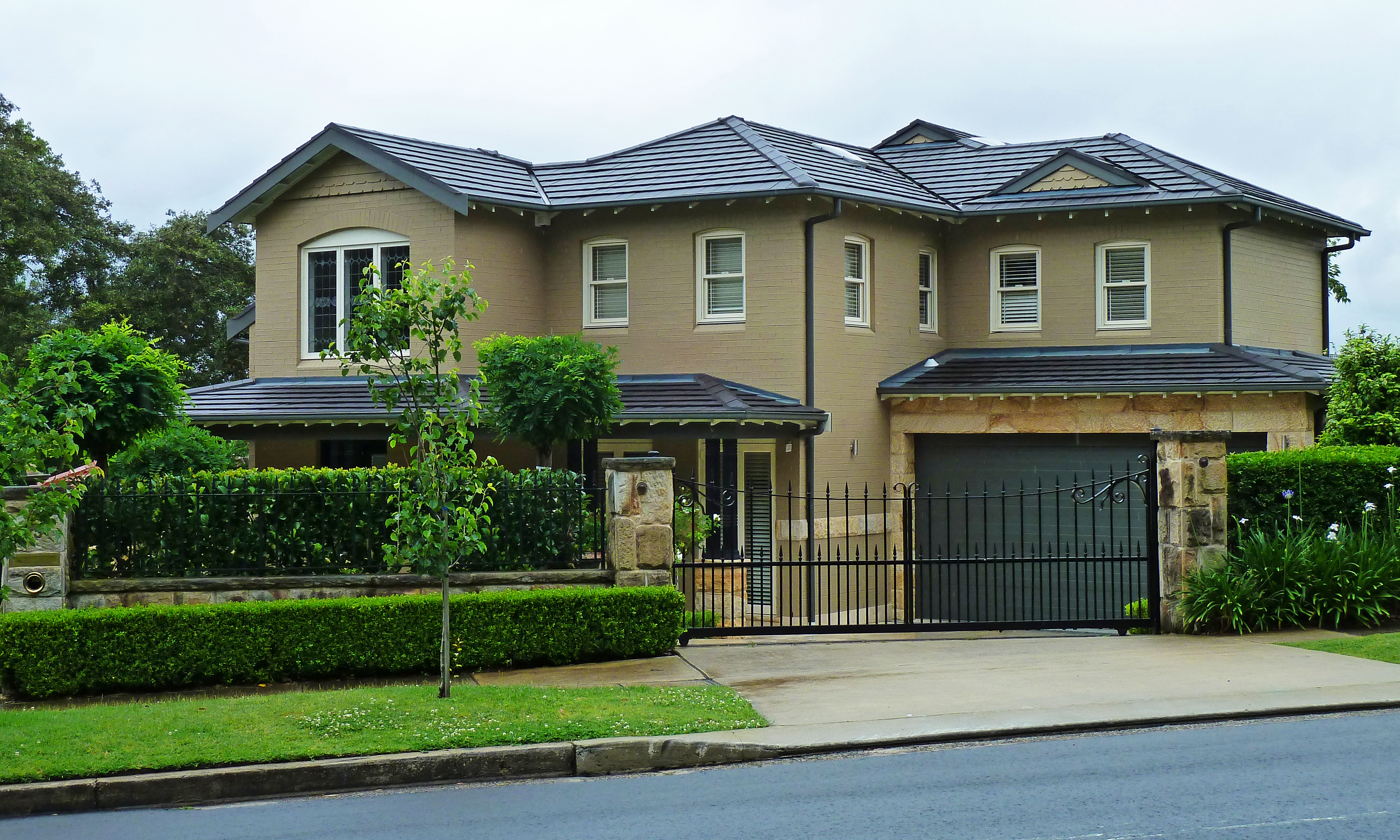
Federation revival house, Springdale Road

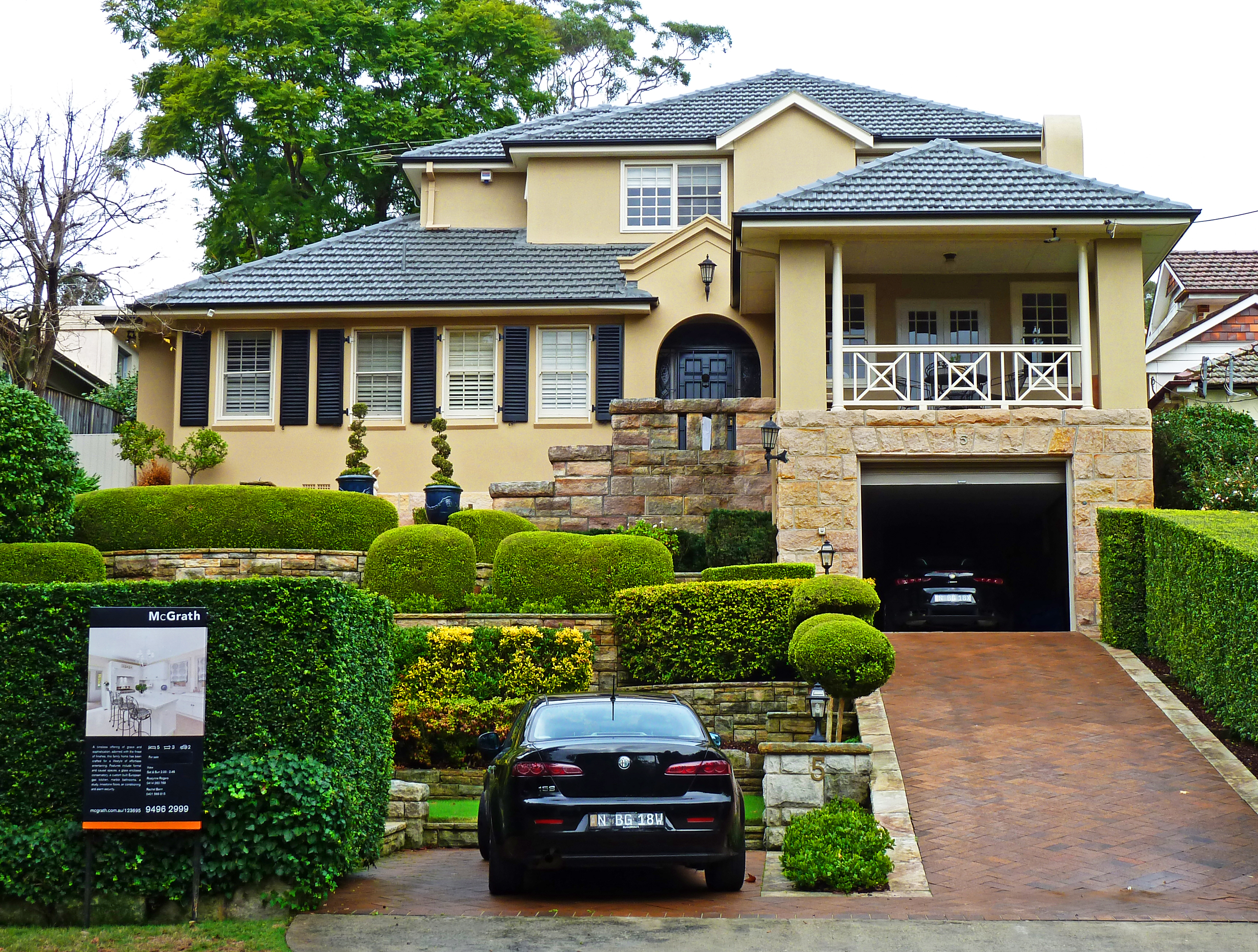
Contemporary home, Kylie Avenue

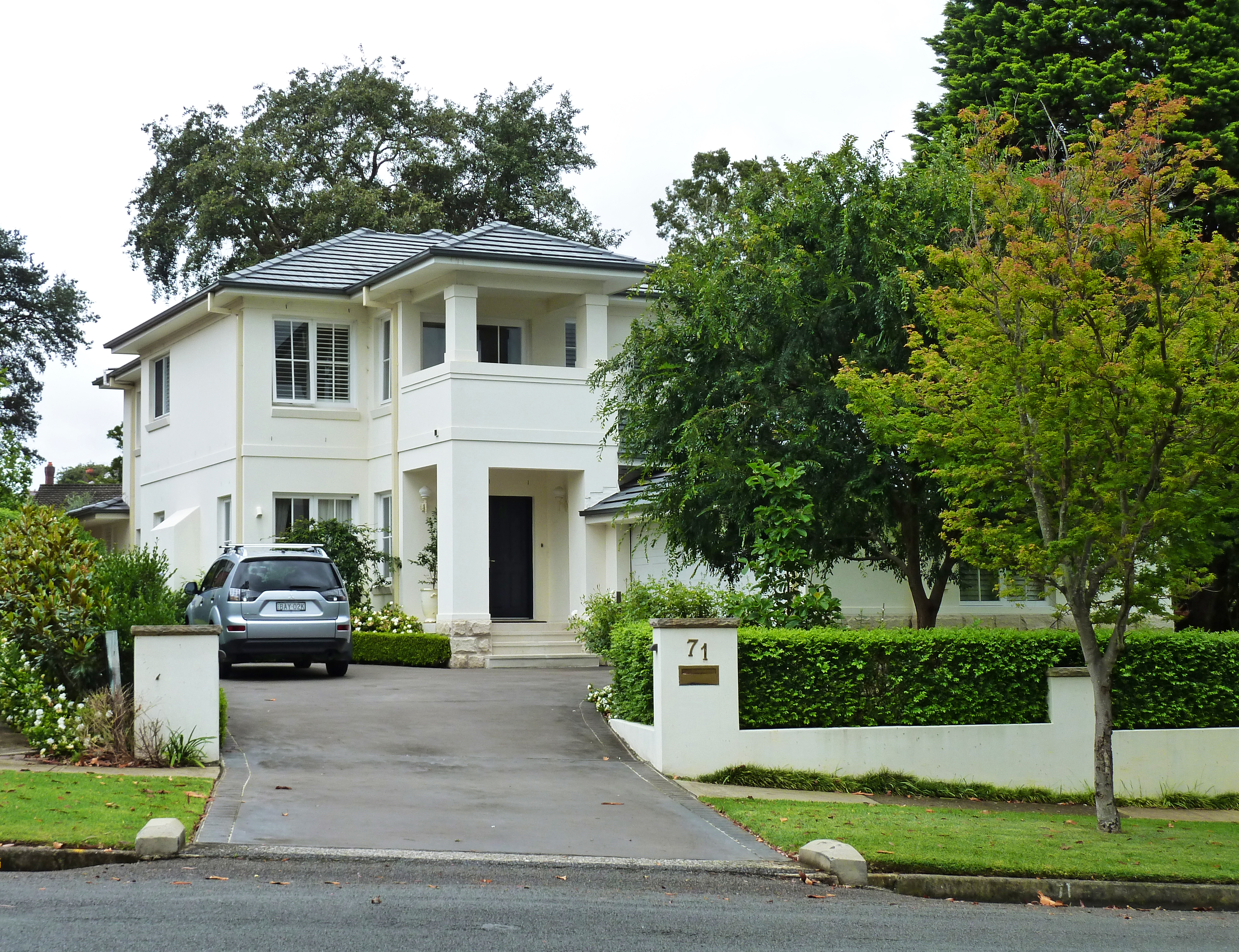
Modern house (c. 2005), Arnold Street

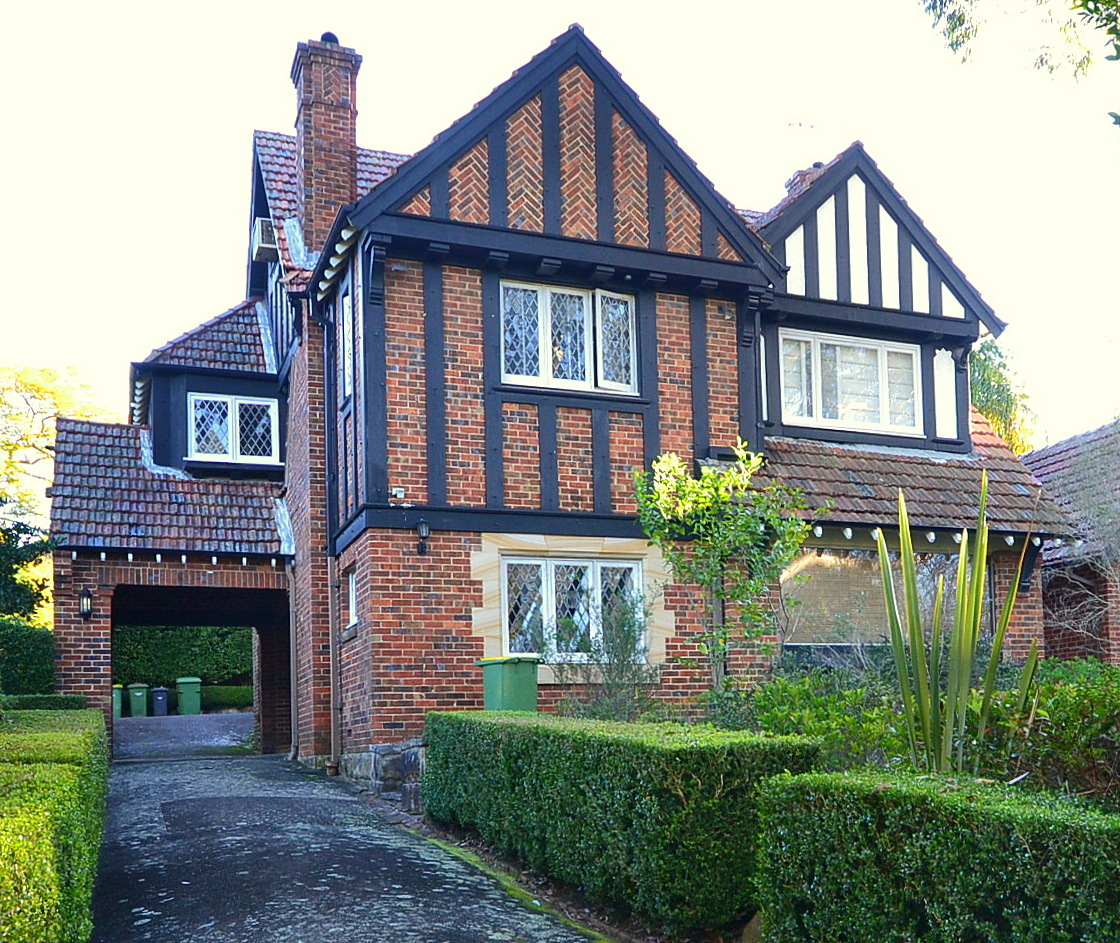
Old English house common within the area

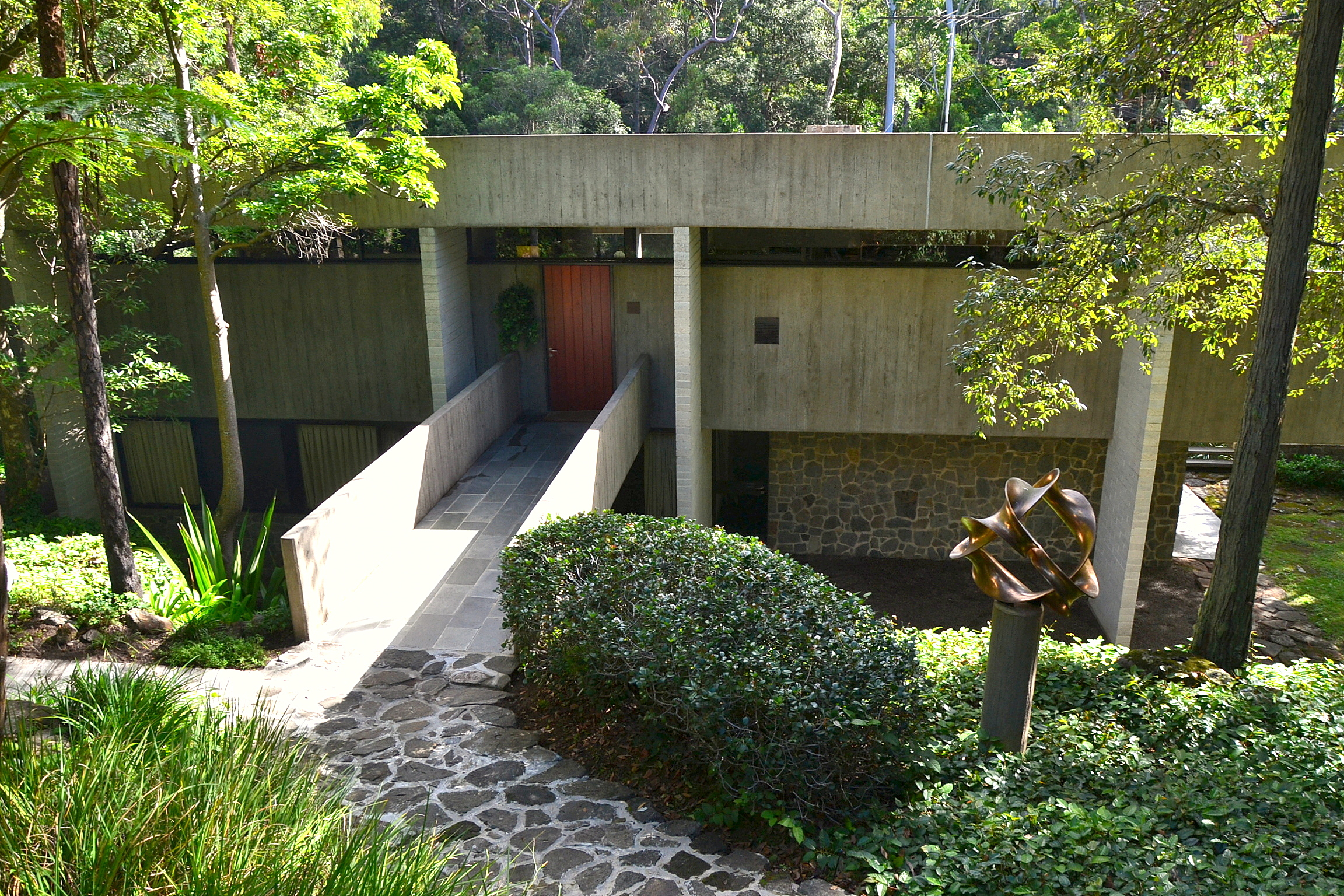
The home of architect Harry Seidler in Kalang Avenue

== Politics ==
For federal elections, Killara lies in the electorate of Bradfield, currently represented by Nicolette Boele. For state elections, Killara falls under the state electoral district of Davidson. The member for Davidson is Matt Cross. In terms of local government, Killara is part of the Ku-ring-gai municipal council.

== Demographics ==
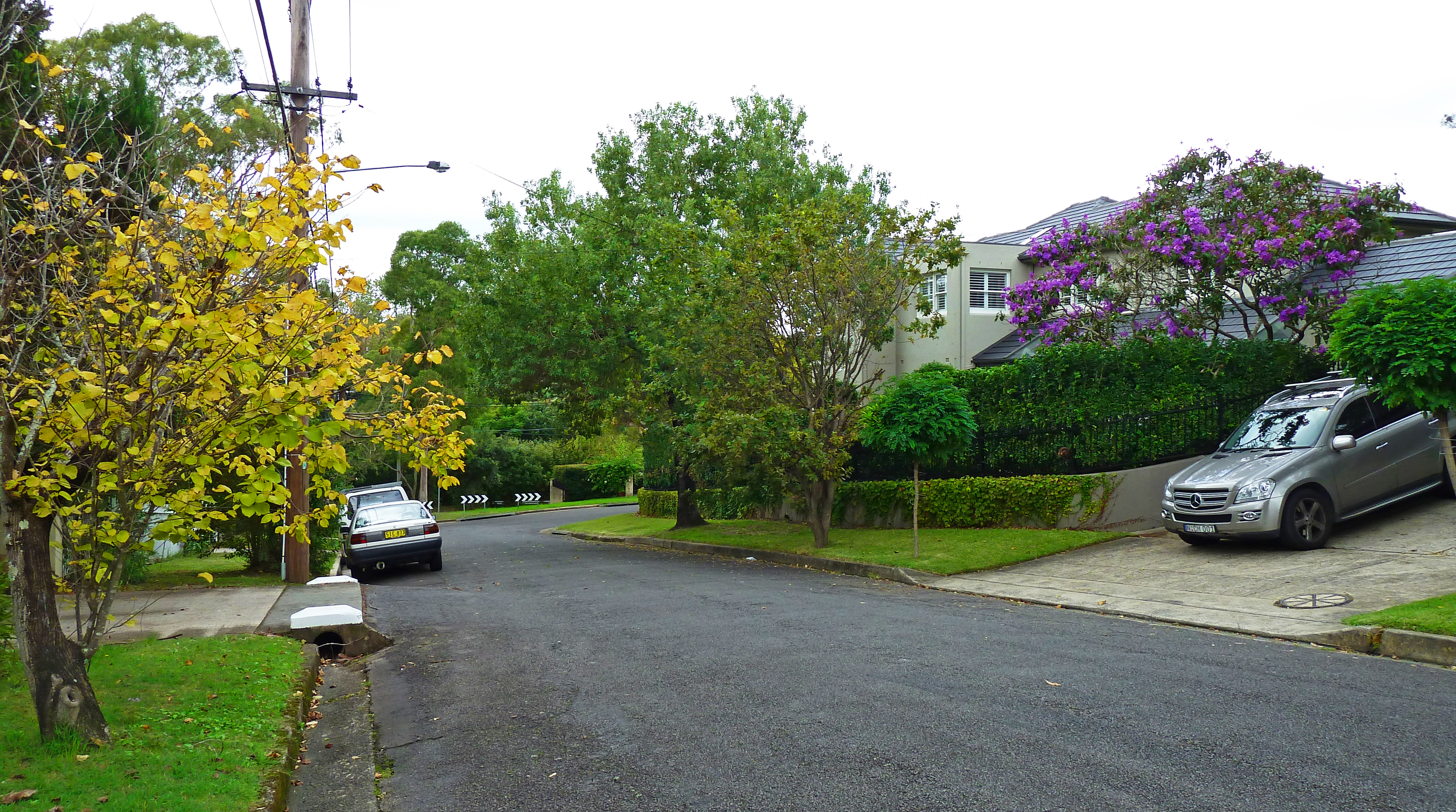
Rosetta Avenue

In the 2021 Australian census, the total population of Killara was 10,620 people; 48.1 percent were male and 51.9 percent were female. 50.6% of people were born in Australia. The most common other countries of birth were China 13.8%, England 4.3%, Hong Kong 4.0%, South Korea 2.7% and India 2.2%. 56.1% of people only spoke English at home. Other languages spoken at home included Mandarin 17.3%, Cantonese 7.8%, Korean 3.4%, Hindi 1.1%, and Japanese 1.0%. The most common responses for religion were No Religion 43.4%, Catholic 15.4% and Anglican 12.5%, Of persons aged 15 years and over, 57.4% were married, 29.0% never married, 5.5% widowed, 6.2% divorced, and 1.8% separated.

The median weekly personal income was $1,117, compared with $805 nationally. The median weekly household income was $2,802, compared with $1,746 nationally. The median weekly family income was $3,294, compared with $2,120 nationally.

At the 2021 census, 54.7% of occupied private dwellings were separate houses and 42.6% were flat or apartments. The average household size was 2.8 people.

== Notable residents ==
- John Alexander OAM MP- Tennis champion and former Federal Member for Bennelong
- Robert Alan Crook – electrical engineer, owner of Alan Crook Electrical manufacturers
- Kim Gamble – children's book illustrator and artist
- Carlyle Greenwell – Architect, philanthropist and designer of Killara Uniting Church and many, now heritage listed, houses
- Peter Jackson – boxer, British Commonwealth and Heavyweight champion
- David Koch, an Australian financial analyst, television presenter and host of Sunrise on the Seven Network
- Elle Macpherson – grew up in Killara and also attended the local high school, Killara High School
- Harry Messel – head of the School of Physics at Sydney University, Australian Atomic Energy Commission (1975–1981), Chancellor of Bond University (1992–1997)
- Charles Scrivener – surveyor
- Penelope Seidler – architect
- Ethel Turner – author of Seven Little Australians, lived on a large property now known as Kiamala Crescent
