= Russell Prize =

Australian literary humour prize

The Russell Prize (Russell Prize for Humour Writing) is an Australian literary prize awarded every second year by the State Library of New South Wales to a humorous book. It was established in 2014 through a donation by Peter Wentworth Russell, "a farmer, businessman and passionate reader". A shortlist of six books is selected and publicly announced before the prize, which comes with a cash award of $10,000.

In 2021 a second category, Humour Writing for Young People, was introduced for a work aimed at the 5–12 age group. Both winners were announced in June 2021.

== Russell Prize for Humour Writing ==
Year	Author	Title	Publisher	Shortlist
2015	Bernard Cohen	The Antibiography of Robert F. Menzies	Fourth Estate	Helen Razer and Bernard Keane, A Short History of Stupid; Jo Case, Boomer & Me, A Memoir of Motherhood, and Asperger's; Sami Shah, I, Migrant; Mark Lamprell, The Full Ridiculous; and Annabel Crabb, The Wife Drought
2017	Steve Toltz	Quicksand	Simon & Schuster	Ross Fitzgerald and Ian McFadyen, Going Out Backwards: A Grafton Everest Adventure; David Hunt, True Girt: The Unauthorised History of Australia — Volume 2; Darrell Pitt, A Toaster on Mars; Ben Pobjie, Error Australis; and Rosie Waterland, The Anti-Cool Girl
2019	David Cohen	The Hunter and Other Stories of Men	Transit Lounge	Trent Dalton, Boy Swallows Universe (Fourth Estate); Tony Martin, Deadly Kerfuffle (Affirm); Ryan O'Neill, The Drover's Wives (Brio); Helen Razer, The Helen 100 (Allen & Unwin); and Tracy Sorensen, The Lucky Galah (Picador).
2021	Nakkiah Lui	Black is the New White	Allen & Unwin	Rawah Arja, The F Team (Giramondo); Chris Flynn, Mammoth (UQP); Dennis Glover, Factory 19 (Black Inc.); Nina Kenwood, It Sounded Better in My Head (Text); Jackie Ryan, Burger Force Vol. 4: Punishment (Parentheses Press).
2023	Martin McKenzie-Murray	The Speechwriter	Scribe	Georgie Carroll, Off the Charts (Pan Macmillan); Kaz Cooke, You’re Doing it Wrong (PRH); Patrick Lenton, Sexy Tales of Paleontology Subbed In); Gretel Killeen, My Daughter’s Wedding Hachette); Steve Toltz, Here Goes Nothing (PRH)
2025	Madeleine Gray	Green Dot		Michelle Brasier, My Brother's Ashes are in a Sandwich Bag (Ultimo); James Colley, The Next Big Thing (Pantera); Madeleine Gray, Green Dot (Allen & Unwin); Sun Jung, My Name is Gucci (Transit Lounge); Siang Lu, Ghost Cities (UQP); A. J. Mackinnon, Quaint Deeds (Black Inc.).

== Humour Writing for Young People ==
Year	Author	Title	Publisher	Shortlist
2021	Philip Bunting	Wombat	Scholastic	Mike Barry, Action Tank – Book 2 (Mike Barry Was Here); Maggie Hutchings, illustrated by Felicita Sala, Your Birthday was the BEST! (Affirm); S. C. Manchild, illustrated by Sam Caldwell, Sneaky Shadows (Berbay); Jaclyn Moriarty, The Stolen Prince of Cloudburst (Allen & Unwin); Bob Graham, The Underhills: A Tooth Fairy Story (Walker Books).
2023	Lian Tanner	Rita's Revenge	Allen & Unwin	Damian Callinan, illustrated by Adele K. Thomas, Weird School (PRH); Tanya Hennessy, illustrated by Leigh Hedstrom, Drum Roll Please, It’s Stevie Louise (Allen & Unwin); Maggie Hutchings, illus by Felicita Sala, Your School is the BEST! (Affirm Press); Sofie Laguna, illustrated by Marc McBride, The House on Pleasant Street (Allen & Unwin); Matt Stanton, Funny Kid Catastrophe (ABC Books)
2025				Gavin Aung Than, Baa Baa Black Belt (Scholastic); H. Hayek, Huda Was Here (Allen & Unwin); Maryam Master, illustrated by Astrid Hicks, Laughter is the Best Ending (Pan); Ross Curnow Oscar vs the Grand Old Dude Named York (Walker); Katherine Collette, Out of Bounds: The Too-Tall Tales of Alma T Best (HarperCollins).
