= Ryan O'Neill (author) =

Australian author (born 1975)

- Born: 1975 (age 50–51); Glasgow, Scotland
- Occupation: Novelist
- Writing career
- Notable awards: 2017 Prime Minister's Literary Award – Fiction, winner

Ryan O'Neill (born 1975) is an Australian writer of fiction and academic.

He is especially known for Their Brilliant Careers: The Fantastic Lives of Sixteen Extraordinary Australian Writers, which won the Prime Minister's Literary Award in 2017.

== Early years and education ==
Ryan O'Neill was born in Glasgow, Scotland, in 1975, and spent the first 25 years of his life in Scotland.

He received a Bachelor of Arts (Honours) from the University of Strathclyde in Scotland, and Master of Science (Accounting) from the University of Bristol in England.

He undertook a Certificate in English Language Teaching to Adults through International House in Sydney, Australia, and later earned his PhD at the University of Newcastle in Newcastle, New South Wales.

== Career ==
O'Neill first worked as an English language teacher in Lithuania, China, and Rwanda, and later settled in Newcastle.

=== Writing ===
O'Neill became known for writing short stories. "An Australian Short Story", first published online in issue 14 of The Lifted Brow in October 2012, is compiled entirely of lines from 149 other stories by Australian authors and poets published between 1850 and 2011.

His debut collection of stories was The Weight of a Human Heart, published in 2012. Several of his stories make reference to Africa, in particular the Rwandan genocide of the mid-1990s.

In 2016 he published a novel based on interconnected fictional biographies of invented Australian writers, titled Their Brilliant Careers: The Fantastic Lives of Sixteen Extraordinary Australian Writers. In it, O'Neill adopts the playful works of the French literary group Oulipo (Ouvroir de Littérature Potentielle), specifically Georges Perec, as his model. The novel satirises various aspects of Australian literature over the past 150 years, and went on to win the 2017 Prime Minister's Literary Award for Fiction.

The Drover's Wives (2018) comprises 99 reinterpretations of the 1892 short story "The Drover's Wife" by Australian author Henry Lawson. O'Neill dedicated the book to both Lawson and French novelist Raymond Queneau, who was a co-founder of Oulipo in 1960.

His fiction has also been published in The Best Australian Stories, The Sleepers Almanac, Meanjin, New Australian Stories, Wet Ink, Etchings and Westerly.

=== Academia ===
As of 2025 O'Neill is the Newstep Academic Literacies coordinator at the Callaghan campus of the University of Newcastle, working as an associate professor in the Department of Education and Innovation.

== Recognition and awards ==
In 2010, writer Alec Patric called Ryan "the most prominent exponent of experimental short fiction in the country". His work has been widely published, and has won the Hal Porter award and The Age Short-Story Prize.

Other awards include:

- 2006: Shortlisted, Steele Rudd Award in the Queensland Premier's Literary Awards, for A Famine in Newcastle
- 2007: Winner, Roland Robinson Literary Award, for "A Speeding Bullet"
- 2013: Recipient of Australia Council Grants, Awards and Fellowships, New Work – Emerging Writers Fiction
- 2017: Their Brilliant Careers: The Fantastic Lives of Sixteen Extraordinary Australian Writers
  - Winner, Prime Minister's Literary Award
  - Shortlisted, Miles Franklin Literary Award
  - Shortlisted, Christina Stead Prize for Fiction at the New South Wales Premier's Literary Awards
- 2019: The Drover's Wives
  - Shortlisted, Russell Prize for Humour Writing
  - Shortlisted, Queensland Literary Awards

== Selected works ==
- A Famine in Newcastle (2006)
- The Weight of a Human Heart (2012)
- Their Brilliant Careers: The Fantastic Lives of Sixteen Extraordinary Australian Writers (2016)
- The Drover's Wives (2018)

== Personal life ==
O'Neill is married and has two daughters.
