= Ross Fitzgerald =

Australian historian and novelist

Ross Fitzgerald AM
- Born: Melbourne, Victoria, Australia
- Education: University of New South Wales
- Occupations: Academic, historian, novelist, secularist, and political commentator
- Known for: Australian Labor Party historian and author
- Political party: The Reason Party
- Spouse: Lyndal Moor (1944–2020)

Ross Andrew Fitzgerald AM is an Australian academic, historian, novelist, secularist, and political commentator. Fitzgerald is an emeritus professor in history and politics at Griffith University. He has authored or co-authored many books, including histories of Queensland; biographies; works about Labor Party politics of the 1950s; and books relating to philosophy, alcohol abuse, and Australian Rules football. He has written many works of fiction.

== Early life and education ==
Ross Andrew Fitzgerald was born in Melbourne, Victoria.

He was awarded his PhD in political theory from the University of New South Wales.

== Career ==
Fitzgerald worked as a lecturer at Griffith University from 1977 to 1986, and then senior lecturer /associate professor between 1987 and 1996, followed by a personal chair between 1996 and 2002. In 2002 Fitzgerald was appointed professor in history and politics.

During his time as an Australian Research Council senior research fellow from 1992 to 1996, as well as writing two political biographies, Fitzgerald co-produced two ABC TV documentaries, about E. G. Theodore and Australia's only Communist Party member of parliament, Fred Paterson.

Fitzgerald writes regular columns for The Australian, The Sydney Morning Herald, The Age and The Canberra City News. He also appears on ABC Radio, ABC Television, Sky News Australia, and Channel 7. He is a regular guest speaker at The Sydney Institute. In 2025 his co-authored novel Chalk and Cheese: A fabrication received critical acclaim.

== Other roles and activities ==
Fitzgerald served as chair of Centenary of Federation Queensland between 1999 and 2002, and as a judge of the Prime Minister's Literary Award for Non Fiction and Australian History.

He was member of the New South Wales Civil and Administrative Tribunal from 2012 to 2016, of the Australian Government's Expert Advisory Group on Drugs and Alcohol between 2000 and 2013, a member of the New South Wales Heritage Council between 2003 and 2009, a member of the New South Wales Parole Board between 2002 and 2012, a member of Administrative Decisions Tribunal of New South Wales between 2002 and 2012, and a member of the Queensland Parole Board between 1997 and 2002.

At the 2016 federal election Fitzgerald was a candidate for the Australian Senate representing the state of New South Wales, standing for the Australian Sex Party (later renamed The Reason Party).

Fitzgerald is a life member of the Australian Republic Movement.

== Recognition and honours ==
In 2014 Fitzgerald as appointed a Member in the Order of Australia (AM) for significant service to education in the field of politics and history as an academic, and to community and public health organisations.

His 2015 book, Going out backwards: a Grafton Everest adventure was shortlisted for the 2017 Russell Prize for Humour Writing.

== Personal life ==
Fitzgerald is a recovering alcoholic who admitted in his memoirs, My Name is Ross: An Alcoholic's Journey and Fifty Years Sober, to consuming excessive alcohol between the ages of 15 and 24 years, when he took his last drink through his regular attendance of Alcoholics Anonymous meetings.

== Published works ==
Fitzgerald has published 47 books, including the following titles:

- Fitzgerald, Ross (1979). The sources of hope. Pergamon Press Australia. ISBN 978-0-08-023104-4.
- Fitzgerald, Ross (1980). Comparing political thinkers. Pergamon Press. ISBN 978-0-08-024799-1.
- Fitzgerald, Ross (1982). From the dreaming to 1915: a history of Queensland. University of Queensland Press. ISBN 978-0-7022-1634-3.
- Fitzgerald, Ross; Moir, Alan (1986). Pushed from the wings: an entertainment. Hale & Iremonger. ISBN 978-0-86806-243-3.
- Fitzgerald, Ross (1987). All about anthrax. Hale & Iremonger. ISBN 978-0-86806-272-3.
- Fitzgerald, Ross; Thornton, Harold (1989). Labor in Queensland: from the 1880s to 1988. University of Queensland Press (published 1988). ISBN 978-0-7022-2152-1.
- Fitzgerald, Ross (1990). Busy in the fog: further adventures of Grafton Everest. Macmillan. ISBN 978-0-7329-0202-5.
- Fitzgerald, Ross; Spillman, Ken, eds. (1989). The Greatest game. William Heinemann Australia (published 1988). ISBN 978-0-85561-270-2.
- Fitzgerald, Ross, ed. (1993). The Eleven deadly sins. Minerva. ISBN 978-0-85561-483-6.
- Fitzgerald, Ross (1994). "Red Ted": the life of E. G. Theodore. University of Queensland Press. ISBN 978-0-7022-2649-6., which was short-listed for the NSW Premier's Prize and for the National Biography Award.
- Fitzgerald, Ross; Allen, Davida; Swan, Robbie (1994). Soaring. Angus & Robertson. ISBN 978-0-207-18348-5., awarded the Eros Foundation erotic novel of the year in 1994.
- Fitzgerald, Ross, ed. (1995). The eleven saving virtues. Minerva. ISBN 978-1-86330-463-4.
- Fitzgerald, Ross (1996). The footy club: inside the Brisbane Bears. University of Queensland Press. ISBN 978-0-7022-2904-6.
- Fitzgerald, Ross (1997). The people's champion, Fred Paterson: Australia's only Communist Party Member of Parliament. University of Queensland Press. ISBN 978-0-7022-2959-6., about Fred Paterson.
- Fitzgerald, Ross (1999). Seven days to remember: the first Labor government in the world: Queensland, 1-7 December 1899. University of Queensland Press. ISBN 978-0-7022-3139-1.
- Fitzgerald, Ross; Moore, Keith (2002). The federation mirror: Queensland 1901-2001. University of Queensland Press. ISBN 978-0-7022-3328-9.
- Fitzgerald, Ross; Carr, Adam James; Dealy, William J. (2003). The Pope's battalions: Santamaria, Catholicism and the Labor split. University of Queensland Press. ISBN 978-0-7022-3389-0.
- Fitzgerald, Ross; Moor, Lyndal, eds. (2008). Growing old (dis)gracefully: 35 Australians reflect on life over 50. ABC Books. ISBN 978-0-7333-2267-9.
- Fitzgerald, Ross; Megarrity, Lyndon; Symons, David (2009). Made in Queensland: a new history. University of Queensland Press. ISBN 978-0-7022-3661-7.
- Fitzgerald, Ross; Blainey, Anna E.; Jordan, Trevor L.; Rakvin, Christine (2009). Under the influence: a history of alcohol in Australia. ABC Books. ISBN 978-0-7333-2301-0.
- Fitzgerald, Ross; Holt, Stephen (2010). Alan "the Red Fox" Reid: pressman par excellence. New South Books. ISBN 978-1-74223-132-7.
- Fitzgerald, Ross (2010). My name is Ross: an alcoholic's journey. New South Books. ISBN 978-1-74223-102-0.
- Fitzgerald, Ross; Jordan, Trevor Leslie (2011). Fools' paradise: life in an altered state. Arcadia. ISBN 978-1-921509-58-2. ISSN 1836-9413.
- Fitzgerald, Ross; Murphy, Rick (2011). Austen Tayshus: merchant of menace. The GHR Press. ISBN 978-0-86806-719-3.
- Fitzgerald, Ross; Spillman, Ken, eds. (2013). Australia's game: stories, essays, verse & drama inspired by the Australian game of football. Richmond, Victoria: Slattery Media Group. ISBN 978-0-9875002-0-5., a book about Australian rules football.
- Fitzgerald, Ross; McFadyen, Ian (27 November 2018). Going out backwards: a Grafton Everest adventure. Ormond, Victoria: Hybrid Publishers (published 2015). ISBN 978-1-925272-10-9. Going out backwards was shortlisted for the 2017 Russell Prize for Humour Writing.
- Reid, Alan Douglas (May 2015). Fitzgerald, Ross (ed.). The Bandar-log: a Labor story of the 1950s. Brisbane, Queensland: Connor Court Publishing (published 2015). ISBN 978-1-925138-52-8.
- Fitzgerald, Ross, ed. (2016). Heartfelt Moments in Australian Rules Football. Connor Court Publishing. ISBN 978-1-9251-3894-8.
- Fitzgerald, Ross; Funnell, Antony (2018). So Far, So Good : An Entertainment. Hybrid Publishers. ISBN 978-1-9252-7297-0.
- Fitzgerald, Ross; McFadyen, Ian (2019). The Dizzying Heights. Hybrid Publishers, Melbourne. ISBN 978-1-9257-36304.
- Fitzgerald, Ross (2020). Fifty Years Sober: An Alcoholic's Journey. Hybrid Publishers, Melbourne.
- Fitzgerald, Ross; McFadyen, Ian (2021). The Lowest Depths: The Eighth in The Grafton Everest series. Hybrid Publishers, Melbourne.
- Fitzgerald, Ross; Price, Neal (2023). My Last Drink: 32 Stories of Recovering Alcoholics. Connor Court, Brisbane.
- Fitzgerald, Ross; McFadyen, Ian (2023). Pandemonium: The Ninth in The Grafton Everest series. Hybrid Publishers, Melbourne.
- Fitzgerald, Ross; McFadyen, Ian (2024). The Ascent of Everest. Hybrid Publishers, Melbourne.
- Fitzgerald, Ross; McFadyen, Ian (2025). Chalk and Cheese: A Fabrication. Hybrid Publishers, Melbourne.
- Fitzgerald, Ross (2026). Rogue: A fictitious memoir. Goala Books: Melbourne. ISBN 978-1-923267-70-1

== Television and film documentaries ==
- Dawson, Jonathan; Laughren, Pat; Fitzgerald, Ross (Producers) (April 1996). The Legend of Fred Paterson. Australian Broadcasting Corporation.
- Laughren, Pat; Fitzgerald, Ross (Producers) (August 1995). Red Ted and the Great Depression. Australian Broadcasting Corporation.

In development

- Price, Neal; Fitzgerald, Ross (Producers). Last Drinks.
- Laughren, Pat; Fitzgerald, Ross (Producers). Stories from the Great Labor Split of the 1950s.
- McFadyen, Ian; Fitzgerald, Ross (Producers). Alexander Kerensky and Nelle Tritton.
