= Rosie Waterland =

Australian author and television personality

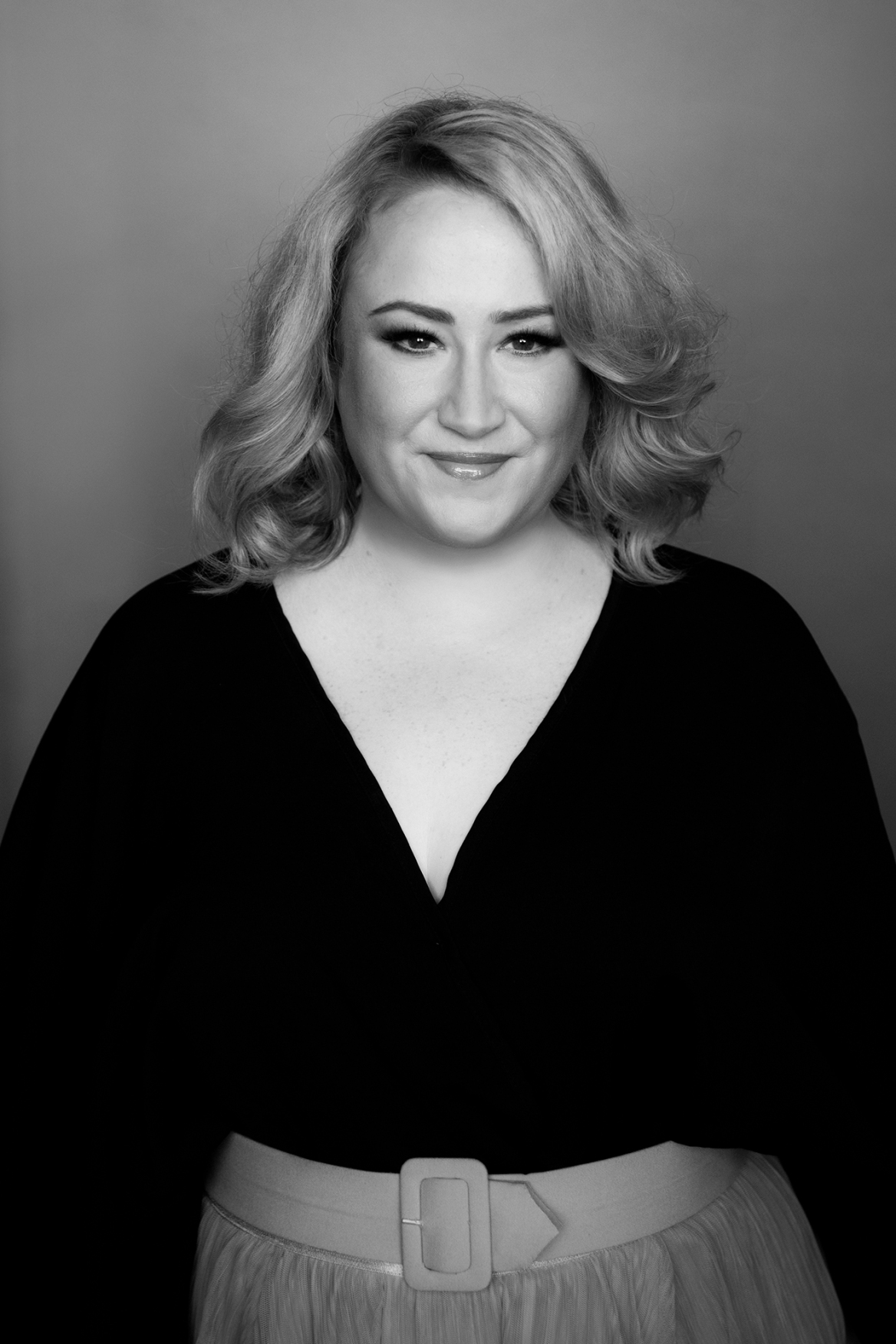
- Waterland in 2019
- Born: 30 May 1986 (age 40); New South Wales, Australia
- Occupations: Comedian, author, television writer, actress
- Years active: 2013–present

Rosanna Alish Waterland (born 30 May 1986) is an Australian comedian, author, screenwriter, and actress. Waterland first rose to popularity in 2013 with her satirical recaps of The Bachelor Australia, and is also known for her books The Anti Cool Girl and Every Lie I've Ever Told.

== Early life and education ==
Rosie Waterland was born in New South Wales on the 30 May, 1986, the second of four sisters. Her early life was difficult. She suffered abuse and neglect by her alcoholic parents, and she lived in over 100 houses, including with foster parents. Her father, Tony Purcell, who suffered from schizophrenia, committed suicide when she was eight, and her mother, Lisa Stevens, committed suicide in January 2024. She went to live in foster homes from the age of 14, and attended 20 different schools.

== Television ==
Waterland first rose to popularity in 2013 with her satirical recaps of the first season of The Bachelor Australia.

Waterland has been a contributing writer and actress on several Australian TV shows, most notably ABC's Tonightly with Tom Ballard and Channel Ten's Sisters. She was also co-star and creator of ABC satirical political documentary series, What's Going On: With Jamila Rizvi and Rosie Waterland, which first aired in 2016.

== Books ==
Waterland's first book, The Anti Cool Girl, published by HarperCollins in 2015, was shortlisted for two Indie Book Awards, the Russell Prize for Humour Writing and two Australian Book Industry Awards, including best biography and best new writer of the year. It won the Australian Book Industry Awards People's Choice Award for Best New Writer of the Year. The Anti Cool Girl sold over 45,000 in its first few months in stores, making it one of the most popular young Australian memoirs in recent times.

Waterland's second book, Every Lie I've Ever Told, was published in July 2017.

In April 2019, it was announced that Waterland had signed a two-book fiction deal with HarperCollins Australia. The first of these books is scheduled for publication in 2024.

Along with her own books, Waterland has also been featured in several popular anthologies. These include Mothers and Others, Better Than Sex, Best Australian Comedy Writing and Choice Words - A collection of writing about abortion.

== Stage tours ==
Waterland debuted her first live one-woman show at the Melbourne International Comedy Festival in March 2016, called "My Life On The Couch (with vodka)". She took the show on a sold-out national tour in October of the same year. She toured Australia with her second one-woman show, "Crazy Lady", in September 2017.

Waterland's next one-woman show, Kid Chameleon, began touring nationally in February 2020, but was put on hiatus due to the pandemic. Kid Chameleon was due to be filmed and distributed as a comedy special in 2024.

== Podcasting ==
In 2017, Waterland created and produced a podcast based on her first book, The Anti-Cool Girl, called Mum Says My Memoir Is A Lie. Mum Says won the 2018 Australian Commercial Radio Award (ACRA) for Best Original Podcast.

Mum Says My Memoir Is A Lie topped the iTunes Podcast chart in its first week of release.

Waterland created her next podcast in 2019, called Just The Gist, which won the 2020 Australian Podcast Award for Best Entertainment Podcast of the year.

== Personal life ==
Waterland has three sisters, to whom she became close as an adult, and reconciled with her mother before her death in 2024.

In December 2016, Waterland came out publicly as bisexual.

On 25 March 2019, she featured in ABC TV's Australian Story, along with her sisters and mother.

She met her then-partner, Adelaide journalist Caleb Bond, in person for the first time in 2019, after befriending him online in 2016 when he was 17 years old. Caleb and Rosie’s relationship ended in August 2023.

She has been hospitalised several times for treatment of PTSD.
