= The Drover's Wives =

Book by Ryan O'Neill

- Author: Ryan O'Neill
- Publisher: Brio Books
- Publication date: July 2018
- Publication place: Australia
- Pages: 304
- ISBN: 9781925589290

The Drover's Wives is a collection of short stories by Ryan O'Neill. It comprises 99 reinterpretations of the 1892 short story "The Drover's Wife" by Australian author Henry Lawson.

O'Neill has dedicated the book to both Lawson and French novelist Raymond Queneau, who was a co-founder of the Oulipo (Ouvroir de Littérature Potentielle) movement in 1960. In The Drover's Wives, O'Neill adopts Queneau's method used in his 1947 book Exercises in Style (French: Exercices de style) which comprises 99 retellings of the same story.

The Drover's Wives was shortlisted for the 2019 Russell Prize and was shortlisted at the 2019 Queensland Literary Awards.
