= Bernard Cohen (Australian author) =

Contemporary Australian novelist

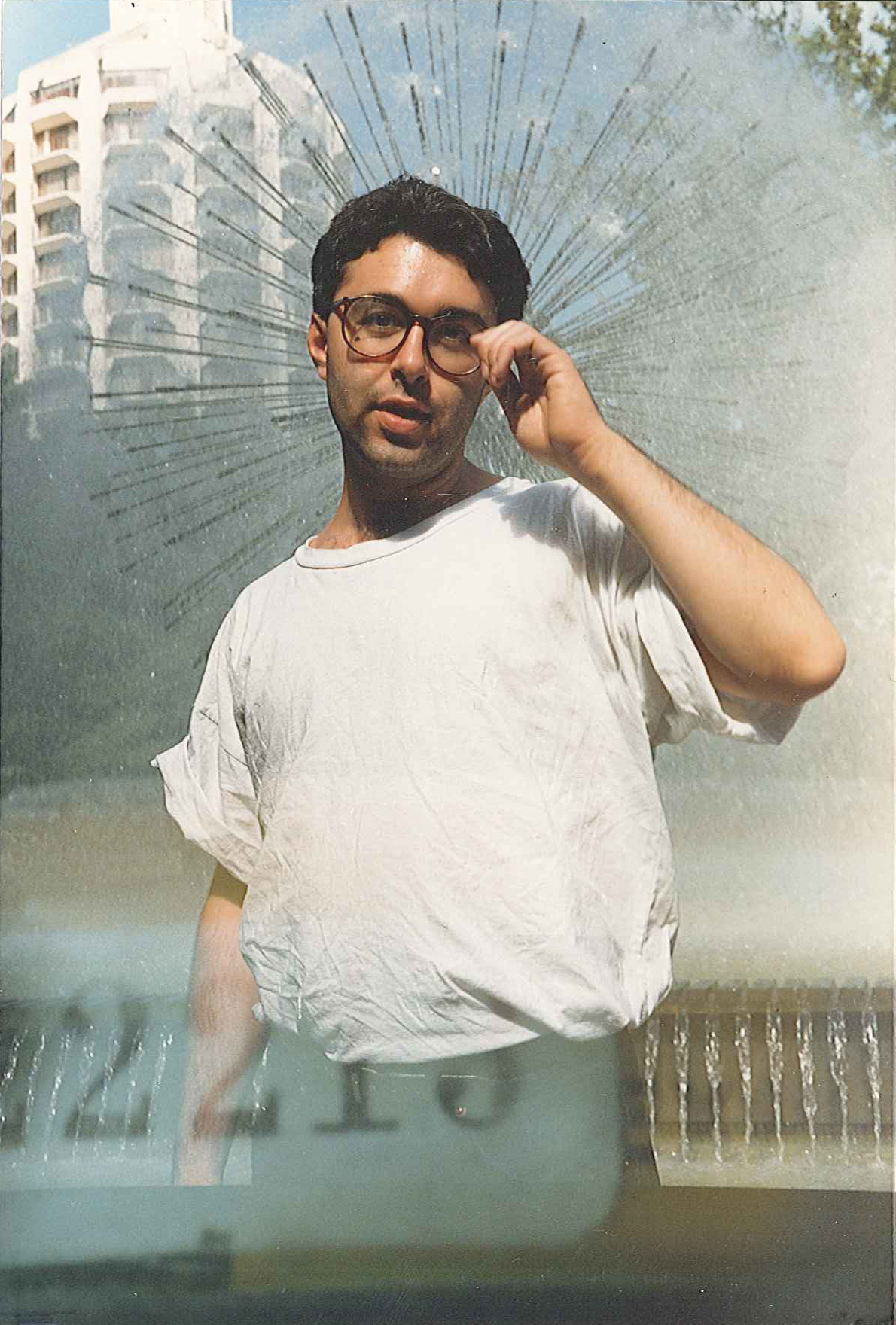
- Bernard Cohen in Kings Cross, New South Wales, 1990
- Born: 1963 (age 62–63); Australia
- Occupation: Writer
- Writing career
- Years active: 1990–present
- Genres: Literary fiction, humour, short stories, children's literature
- Notable works: The Blindman's Hat (1997); Snowdome (1998); The Antibiography of Robert F Menzies (2013); Paul Needs Specs (2003)
- Notable awards: Australian/Vogel Literary Award (1996); Russell Prize for Humour Writing (2015)

Bernard Cohen (born 1963) is an Australian writer, the author of five novels, a book of short stories and a children's picture book.

== Career ==
Cohen's first novel, Tourism, was published in 1992. The Blindman's Hat won the Australian/Vogel Literary Award in 1996. Cohen's fifth novel, The Antibiography of Robert F Menzies, won the inaugural Russell Prize for Humour Writing. Cohen's short stories have been widely anthologised, including in the Penguin Century of Australian Stories, Best Australian Stories 2002 and 2009 and Picador New Writing. His first collection of short stories, When I Saw the Animal (UQP), was published in 2018. From 1990 to 1991 he was co-editor of the literary journal Editions Review.

In 2006 Cohen founded The Writing Workshop, which runs creative writing programs for children in New South Wales, and online.

== Awards ==
- 2015 Russell Prize for Humour Writing for The Antibiography of Robert F Menzies
- 1996 The Australian / Vogel Literary Award for The Blindman's Hat
- Sydney Morning Herald Best Young Australian novelist (3 times: 1996 [for Tourism], 1997 [for The Blindman's Hat], 1998 [for Snowdome]
- 2001 Arts Council England Writer's Award
- 1997 Alumnus of the Year University of Technology, Sydney
- 1986 Winner, Canberra Times Short Story of the Year (under 25 year-old category).

== Bibliography ==
Novels

- Tourism (Picador, Sydney, 1992)
- The Blindman's Hat (Allen and Unwin, Sydney, 1997)
- Snowdome (Allen and Unwin, Sydney, 1998)
- Hardly Beach Weather (HarperCollins, Sydney, 2002)
- The Antibiography of Robert F Menzies (Fourth Estate, Sydney, 2013), winner of the Russell Prize.

Children's book

- Paul Needs Specs, illustrated by Geoff Kelly (Penguin, Melbourne, 2003; Kane/Miller, La Jolla, California 2004; Booxen, Seoul, 2011)

Other publications

- Speedfactory co-authored with John Kinsella, McKenzie Wark and Terri-ann White (Fremantle Arts Centre Press, Fremantle, 2002)
- Foreign Logics CD-ROM, collaboration with David Bickerstaff (DA2 digital arts development agency, Bristol 2001; Institute of Contemporary Art (ICA London) New Media work of the month, September 2001)
- Analects zine co-authored with Brent Clough (self-published, Sydney, 1988)
- When I Saw The Animal (short story collection, 2018)
