= East Lindfield =

- Suburb
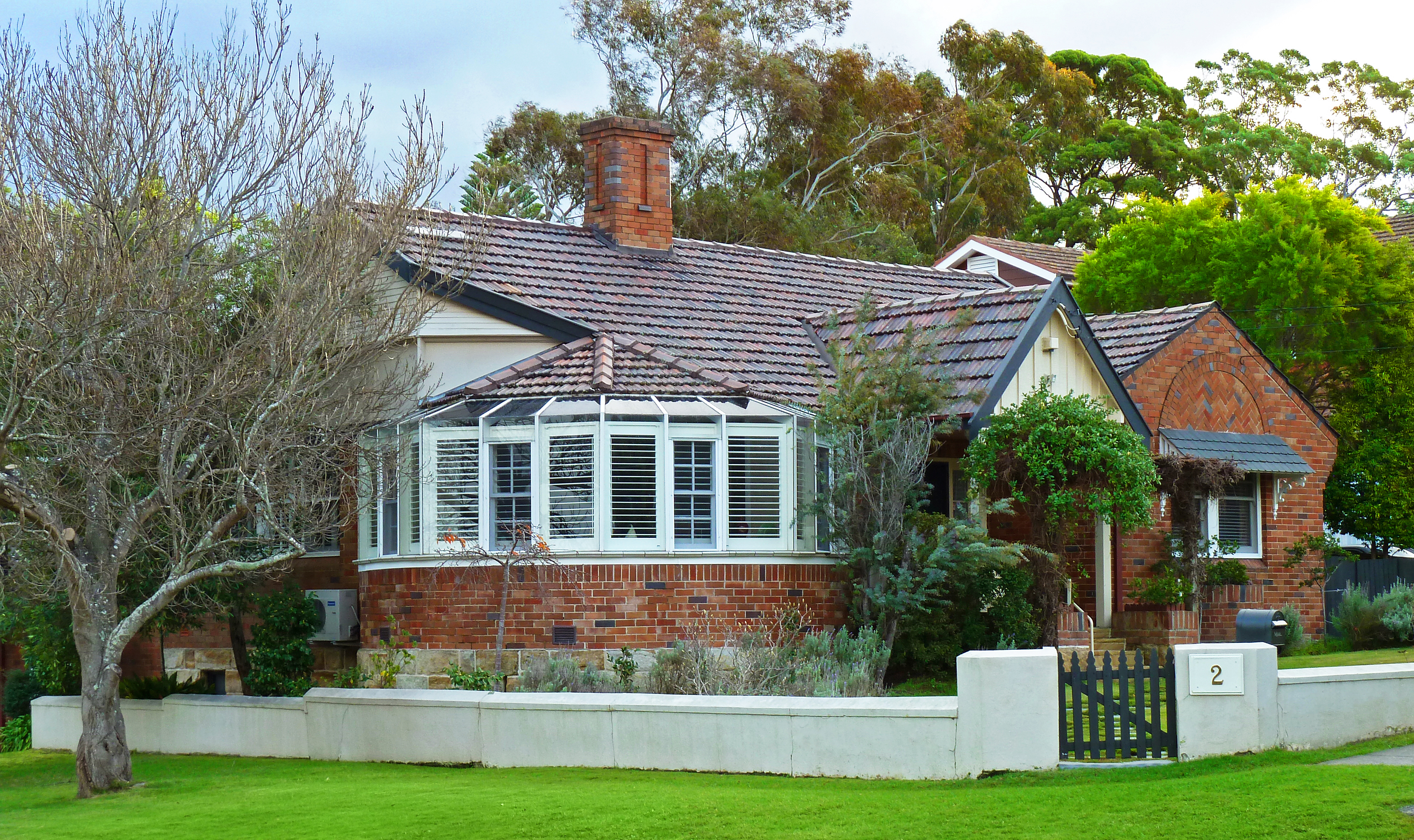
- c. 1930 house, Sydney Road

- Interactive map of East Lindfield
- Country: Australia
- State: New South Wales
- City: Sydney
- LGA: Ku-ring-gai Council
- Location: 13 km (8.1 mi) NW of Sydney CBD

Government
  - State electorate: Davidson
  - Federal division: Bradfield
- Elevation: 103 m (338 ft)

Population
  - Total: 3,710 (2021 census)
- Postcode: 2070
Suburbs around East Lindfield
Killara	East Killara	East Killara
Lindfield	East Lindfield	Forestville
Roseville	Roseville Chase	Killarney Heights

East Lindfield is a suburb on the Upper North Shore of Sydney in the state of New South Wales, Australia. East Lindfield is located 13 kilometres north-west of the Sydney Central Business District in the local government area of Ku-ring-gai Council. Lindfield is a separate suburb to the west sharing the postcode of 2070.

== History ==
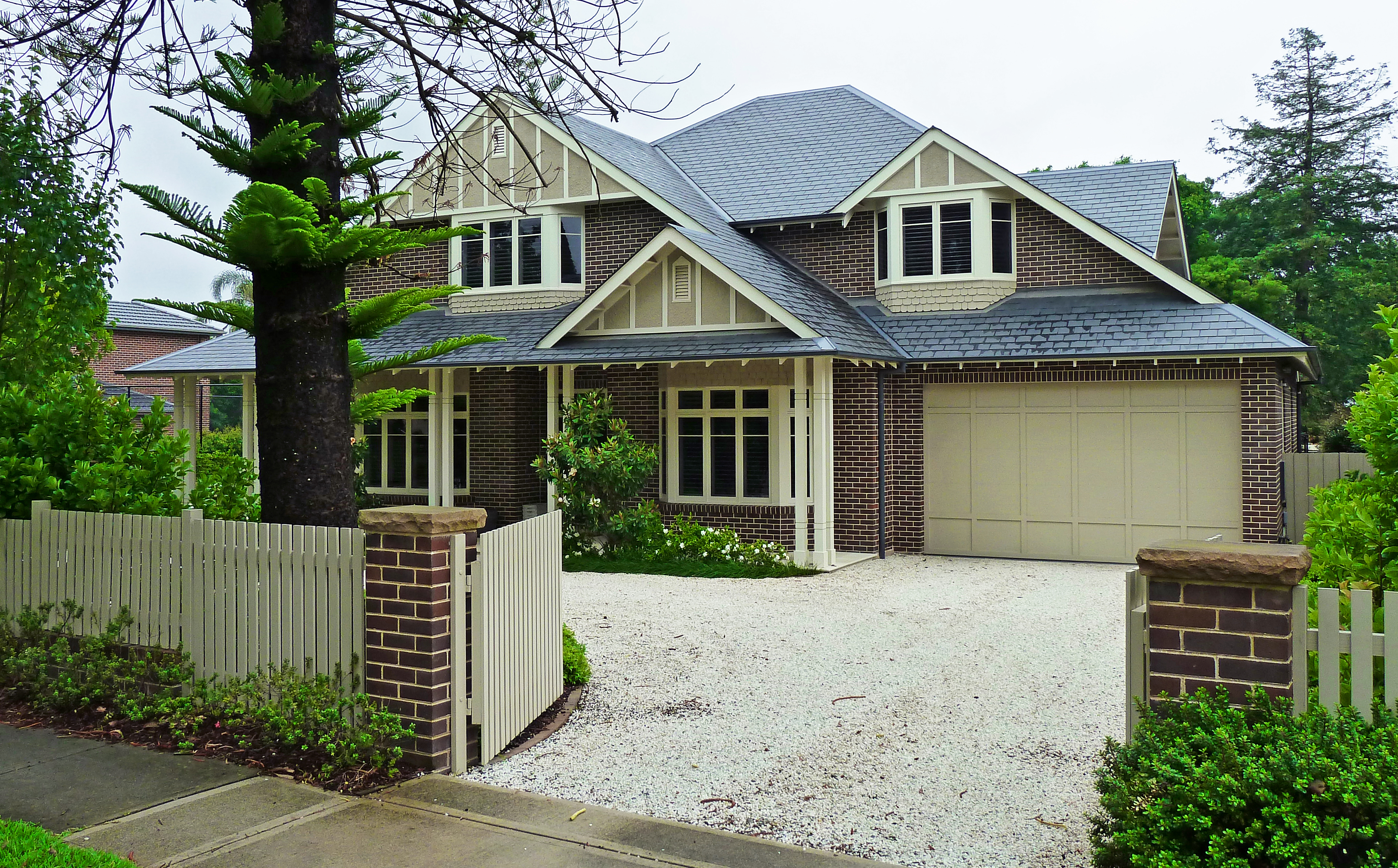
Federation revival house, Middle Harbour Road

Lindfield means "lime tree field". The Lindfield area was settled in the 1850s. The name derives from the native town of early landowner Mr List, who named his house after Lindfield, Sussex, England. When the railway line came through the area in the 1890s, the name of the property was used to identify the station and neighbourhood.

Suburban development in East Lindfield occurred mostly in the 1950s and 1960s, so most of the houses in East Lindfield are newer and have a different style to those of Lindfield, which mostly pre-date World War II.

East Lindfield became a separate suburb from Lindfield when it was gazetted on 5 August 1994.

Meadow Lea

Meadow Lea, is the grand five-bedroom East Lindfield art deco estate identified by its distinctive Meadow Lea paint colour. It was built in the early 1940's for the prominent margarine industrialist James Armstrong. The home boasts a grand foyer, dining room and a sprung floor ballroom, with a thermostatically controlled two-zone cellar that can hold 2,500 bottles.

== Transport ==
Lindfield railway station is the nearest station on the North Shore railway line of the Sydney Trains network. Busways run bus routes 206, 207, 208 and 209 to East Lindfield.

At the 2021 census, 2.6% of employed people used public transport as at least one of their methods of travel to work and 26.7% travelled by car.

== Education ==
The suburb has a primary school, Lindfield East Public School established in 1929.

The suburb also has a community preschool, Lindfield East Community Preschool, established in 1976.

== Population ==
According to the 2021 census, there were 3,710 residents in East Lindfield, with 91.3% occupied private dwellings, mostly (87.9%) living in a separate house. The median age was 43 and average number of children was 2 (1.1 for all households).

- Many were families: there was a high rate of married people in East Lindfield, with 61.9% of residents aged 15 years and over being married (the national average was 46.5%), and children under 15 constituted 20.9% of the population (the national average is 18.2%).
- The most common ancestries in East Lindfield were English 30.5%, Australian 23.6%, Chinese 30.4%, Irish 9.2% and Scottish 8.9%. 58.5% of people in East Lindfield were born in Australia. The most common countries of birth outside Australia were China (excluding SAR and Taiwan) 11.2%, England 5.5% and Hong Kong 3.7%. 64.5% of people only spoke English at home. Other languages spoken at home included Mandarin 14% and Cantonese 9.4%, Korean, Japanese and German were also represented.
- The most common responses for religion were No Religion 41.8%, Anglican 17% and Catholic 16.3%, Buddhism was 3.8% and 3.5% were Not stated.
- East Lindfield residents had higher than the national average incomes, with a median weekly household income of $3,457 compared to the national average of $1,746. Residents of East Lindfield were above the national average of 14.1% in voluntary work with 23.2% participating in voluntary work through an organisation or group in the prior 12 months.
- Health wise, East Lindfield residents had 68.5% with no long term health conditions (vs 60.2% in the national average).

== Notable residents ==
- Iven Mackay, army officer
- Steven Solomon, Olympic sprinter
