= West Killara =

Human settlement in New South Wales, Australia

Coordinates: 33°46′46″S 151°08′41″E

West Killara is a locality in the suburb of Killara, a suburb located on the Upper North Shore Sydney, in the state of New South Wales, Australia. It is located 14 kilometres north-west of the Sydney Central Business District in the local government area of Ku-ring-gai Council.

West Killara is bounded on the north and east by Lady Game Drive, to the south-east by Fiddens Wharf Road and to the south and west by the Lane Cove River and Lane Cove National Park.

West Killara has no shops but is close to a small shopping area in Moore Avenue, Lindfield. A bus service runs to Lindfield railway station.

Beaumont Road Public School, a government primary school located in Beaumont Road.
