= Cedric Spencer =

Australian politician and lawyer

Mayor of Ku-ring-gai Council
- In office 21 September 2021 – 4 December 2021
- Deputy: Sam Ngai
- Preceded by: Jennifer Anderson
- Succeeded by: Jeff Pettett

Deputy Mayor of Ku-ring-gai Council
- In office 22 September 2020 – 21 September 2021
- Preceded by: Callum Clarke
- Succeeded by: Sam Ngai

Councillor of Ku-ring-gai Council
- Incumbent
- Assumed office 9 September 2017 Serving with Donna Greenfield and Kim Wheatley
- Preceded by: Duncan McDonald and Chantelle Fornari-Orsmond
- Constituency: Wahroonga ward

Personal details
- Party: Independent (2026 onwards)
- Other political affiliations: Independent Liberal (until 2026)
- Website: Councillor profile

Cedric Ricardo Spencer is an Australian politician and lawyer who is a councillor on Ku-ring-gai Council. He previously served as Mayor from September to December 2021 and Deputy Mayor of the council from September 2020 to January 2022. On council, he was an independent member of the Liberal Party, however his membership of the party was suspended in June 2026.

Spencer operates a legal firm in Gordon and volunteered with the Marrickville Community Legal Centre and Aboriginal Legal Services in 2013.

== Legal career ==
As of 2013, Spencer is a lawyer and volunteers at Marrickville Community Legal Centre and Aboriginal Legal Services.

== Political career ==
Spencer's first attempt at entering politics was in 2013 when he stood as the Liberal candidate for then-transport minister Anthony Albanese's seat of Grayndler.

Spencer was elected Mayor of Ku-ring-gai Council on 21 September 2021.

Under Spencer's leadership of the council, councillors repeatedly boycotted meetings due to a motion to review the appointment of general manager John McKee. Shortly after local government minister Shelley Hancock indicated that the state government may intervene in the council, Spencer requested that the motion to review McKee's performance be withdrawn. In October 2021, Spencer was banned from speaking to council staff. McKee stated "It is not appropriate for staff to be subjected to explicit or implicit threats of dismissal by a mayor", McKee also said that he received legal advice when coming to this decision.

Spencer's term as Mayor concluded on 4 December 2021. He was replaced as Mayor by Jeff Pettett.

In 2023, the NSW Government commenced an investigation of a $3.6 million grant provided to Ku-ring-gai Council for a grandstand at North Turramurra Recreational Area. The council initially voted in favour of signing the contract to build the grandstand but has since received criticism from the community, so was voted on by the council again. Spencer stated that the plan needed to be free of risk of falling afoul of grant guidelines, he was concerned that there was no 50% co-payment contribution from the Northern Suburbs Football Association, he said that the project may expose the council to "considerable risks of cost overruns and ongoing maintenance and operational costs", he also said that the proposal would make the football association "the primary users of this site at the expense of all other users for decades to come".

In September 2023, the council voted against a motion that would re-employ McKee as General Manager, Spencer joined the votes against this motion.

As Ku-ring-gai Council was challenging the state government's housing law reforms in the Land and Environment Court in 2024, Spencer said the council was taking an "ineffective and unnecessarily expensive" approach to challenging the reforms, he called for a more "proactive" approach to finding solutions to boost housing supply, he also said that the council's actions were being driven by a small group of activists who have been very vocal in the community for the past 20 years.

In October 2025, Spencer was charged with one count of using "a carriage service namely mobile phone in such a way that reasonable persons would regard that use as being menacing, harassing or offensive". In the alleged conversation, Spencer launched a "verbal tirade" against fellow councillor Matthew Devlin. These charges were dropped in August 2026. He is required to receive medical and psychological treatment.

Spencer said to state MP for Wahroonga Alister Henskens that if he won his challenge against then-Mayor Jennifer Anderson he would "fire McKee immediately", which was further encouraged when Henskens said "Get rid of John McKee [sic]", Henskens also requested that Andrew Watson, director of strategy and environment at Ku-ring-gai Council. Spencer had notified Henskens of the mayoral challenge in advance of the vote. Spencer said that Henskens was agitated by McKee not proceeding quickly enough with several projects that received state government funding.

On 12 June 2026, Spencer was suspended from the Liberal Party for six months on the basis that state director Mark Neeham thought Spencer's Facebook posts about Henskens were likely to "cause embarrassment", this means that he has also forfeited his positions within the party as President of the South Warrawee Branch and Conference Executive for the Bradfield Federal Electoral Conference.

== Personal life ==
Spencer is of English, Portuguese and Chinese heritage, and speaks several Asian languages. As of 2021, he lived in Pymble with his wife and a son.

Spencer is president of the Warrawee branch of the Liberal Party.

Political offices
Preceded by Jennifer Anderson	Mayor of Ku-ring-gai Council; 2021–2022	Succeeded by Jeff Pettett

Political offices
Preceded by Callum Clarke	Deputy mayor of Ku-ring-gai Council; 2020–2021	Succeeded by Sam Ngai

Political offices
Preceded by Duncan McDonald and Chantelle Fornari-Orsmond	Councillor of Ku-ring-gai Council; 2017–present	Incumbent
