= List of mayors of Ku-ring-gai =

Mayor of Ku-ring-gai
- Incumbent; Kim Wheatley since 15 September 2026
- Style: His/Her Worship the Mayor Councillor
- Appointer: Ku-ring-gai Council
- Term length: 2 years
- Inaugural holder: Cr. William Cowan (Shire President); Ald. George Christie (Mayor)
- Formation: 8 December 1906 (as Shire President); 2 November 1928 (as Mayor)
- Deputy: Matt Devlin
- Website: www.kmc.nsw.gov.au

This is a list of the shire presidents and mayors of Ku-ring-gai Council and its predecessors, a local government area of New South Wales, Australia. The official title of mayors while holding office is: His/Her Worship the Mayor of Ku-ring-gai. The current mayor of Ku-ring-gai is Councillor Kim Wheatley, elected on 15 September 2026.

== Development of the office ==
Ku-ring-gai was first incorporated on 6 March 1906 as the "Shire of Ku-ring-gai" and the first shire council was elected on 24 November 1906. The first leader of the council was elected at the first meeting on 8 December 1906, when Councillor William Cowan was elected as Shire President. There would not be a deputy president until the council election on 1 March 1920. On 22 September 1928, the Shire of Ku-ring-gai was proclaimed as the "Municipality of Ku-ring-gai" and the titles of 'Shire President' and 'Councillor' were retitled to be 'Mayor' and 'Alderman' respectively. In 1993, with the passing of a new Local Government Act, council was retitled as simply "Ku-ring-gai Council" and aldermen were retitled as councillors.

== List of incumbents ==
=== Presidents and deputy presidents of Ku-ring-gai Shire Council, 1906–1928 ===
Years	Shire presidents	Deputy presidents	Year
8 December 1906 – 6 February 1908	William Cowan		
6 February 1908 – 4 February 1911	William Thomas Wait		
4 February 1911 – 4 February 1914	Paul Clipsham		
4 February 1914 – 1 February 1917	James Young		
1 February 1917 – 22 December 1921	William Robert Fitzsimons	Walter Scott Griffiths	1 March 1920
22 December 1921 – 7 December 1923	Norman McIntosh		
22 December 1921 – 7 December 1923	Norman McIntosh	Malcolm McFayden	22 December 1921
22 December 1921 – 7 December 1923	Norman McIntosh	John Gilmour Lockley	7 December 1922
7 December 1923 – 5 December 1924	John Gilmour Lockley	Christopher Bowes Thistlethwayte	7 December 1923
5 December 1924 – 6 December 1927	Christopher Bowes Thistlethwayte		
5 December 1924 – 6 December 1927	Christopher Bowes Thistlethwayte	Malcolm McFayden	5 December 1924
5 December 1924 – 6 December 1927	Christopher Bowes Thistlethwayte	George Christie	15 December 1925
6 December 1927 – 22 September 1928	George Christie	William Henry Read	6 December 1927

=== Mayors and deputy mayors of Ku-ring-gai Municipal Council, 1928–present ===
Years	Mayors	Deputy mayors	Year
22 September 1928 – 19 March 1929	George Christie	William Henry Read	22 September 1928
19 March 1929 – 5 December 1933	Walter Cresswell O'Reilly		
19 March 1929 – 5 December 1933	Walter Cresswell O'Reilly	Audley Hubert Brennan	19 March 1929
19 March 1929 – 5 December 1933	Walter Cresswell O'Reilly	James Briton	2 December 1930
19 March 1929 – 5 December 1933	Walter Cresswell O'Reilly	Ernest Selby	6 December 1932
5 December 1933 – 4 December 1934	Ernest Selby	James Briton	5 December 1933
4 December 1934 – 10 December 1935	George Seville Travis	Claude Ewen Cameron	4 December 1934
10 December 1935 – 18 December 1936	Claude Ewen Cameron	William King McLean	10 December 1935
18 December 1936 – 7 December 1937	George Seville Travis	Michael L'Estrange	18 December 1936
7 December 1937 – 12 December 1939	Herbert Gordon Carter		
7 December 1937 – 12 December 1939	Herbert Gordon Carter	Michael L'Estrange	7 December 1937
7 December 1937 – 12 December 1939	Herbert Gordon Carter	George Seville Travis	13 December 1938
12 December 1939 – 9 December 1941	Noel Desmond McIntosh	George Seville Travis	12 December 1939
9 December 1941 – 7 December 1943	Robert Taylor Rutledge		
9 December 1941 – 7 December 1943	Robert Taylor Rutledge	George Seville Travis	9 December 1941
9 December 1941 – 7 December 1943	Robert Taylor Rutledge	Joseph Hector Brown	8 December 1942
7 December 1943 – 5 December 1944	George Seville Travis	Robert Taylor Rutledge	7 December 1943
5 December 1944 – 11 December 1945	Robert Taylor Rutledge	Geoffrey Herbert Robin	5 December 1944
11 December 1945 – 3 December 1946	Geoffrey Herbert Robin	Joseph Hector Brown	11 December 1945
3 December 1946 – 7 December 1948	Joseph Hector Brown		
3 December 1946 – 7 December 1948	Joseph Hector Brown	Geoffrey Herbert Robin	3 December 1946
3 December 1946 – 7 December 1948	Joseph Hector Brown	Alexander Powell Cooke	9 December 1947
7 December 1948 – 5 December 1950	Robert Taylor Rutledge	John Paradine Middleton	7 December 1948
5 December 1950 – 2 December 1952	Eric Saxby Solomon		
5 December 1950 – 2 December 1952	Eric Saxby Solomon	Andrew Noble Campbell	5 December 1950
5 December 1950 – 2 December 1952	Eric Saxby Solomon	Reginald Nelson Walker	4 December 1951
2 December 1952 – 11 December 1956	Herbert Thomas Cornish		
2 December 1952 – 11 December 1956	Herbert Thomas Cornish	George McCahon Sinclair	2 December 1952
2 December 1952 – 11 December 1956	Herbert Thomas Cornish	Andrew Noble Campbell	11 December 1953
11 December 1956 – 14 December 1959	Andrew Noble Campbell	Reginald Nelson Walker	11 December 1956
14 December 1959 – 5 December 1961	Harry Jago	Reginald Nelson Walker	14 December 1959
5 December 1961 – 10 December 1962	Reginald Nelson Walker	Alastair Gibson Muir	5 December 1961
10 December 1962 – 3 December 1963	George Revans Nicol	Elizabeth Marian Carter	10 December 1962
3 December 1963 – 7 December 1964	Adrian Allaster Cox	Reginald Nelson Walker	3 December 1963
7 December 1964 – 16 December 1966	Justin Roald Rickard		
7 December 1964 – 16 December 1966	Justin Roald Rickard	Robert Sutherland Turner	7 December 1964
7 December 1964 – 16 December 1966	Justin Roald Rickard	Norman Scott McDonald	13 December 1965
16 December 1966 – 4 December 1967	Norman Scott McDonald	John Gordon McLean	16 December 1966
4 December 1967 – 13 December 1968	John Harris	John Gordon McLean	4 December 1967
13 December 1968 – 9 December 1970	Robert Sutherland Turner		
13 December 1968 – 9 December 1970	Robert Sutherland Turner	Mavis Alexandra McMillan	13 December 1968
13 December 1968 – 9 December 1970	Robert Sutherland Turner	Richard John Basto	16 December 1969
9 December 1970 – 23 September 1971	Bryan Maxwell Mason	James Frederick Bennett	9 December 1970
23 September 1971 – 26 September 1973	James Frederick Bennett		
23 September 1971 – 26 September 1973	James Frederick Bennett	Michael Marcel Strenger	23 September 1971
23 September 1971 – 26 September 1973	James Frederick Bennett	Richard John Basto	23 September 1972
26 September 1973 – 2 October 1974	Michael Eugene Kartzoff	George Henry Bardsley	26 September 1973
2 October 1974 – 30 September 1975	Anthony Earl Cronin	Trevor Carter Brown	2 October 1974
30 September 1975 – 26 September 1977	Trevor Carter Brown	Roy Woodward	30 September 1975
26 September 1977 – 25 September 1979	Richard Cleveland Lennon	Yolanda Amalia Lee	26 September 1977
25 September 1979 – 1 October 1980	Howard Parkinson Vains	Yolanda Amalia Lee	25 September 1979
1 October 1980 – 22 September 1981	Richard Cleveland Lennon	Brian John Taylor	1 October 1980
22 September 1981 – 11 October 1983	Brian John Taylor		
22 September 1981 – 11 October 1983	Brian John Taylor	William Ferrier Thomson	22 September 1981
22 September 1981 – 11 October 1983	Brian John Taylor	Michael Eugene Kartzoff	13 September 1982
11 October 1983 – 27 September 1984	Steven Paul Klinger	Robert James Webeck	11 October 1983
27 September 1984 – 27 September 1987	Ronald Victor Yeates		
27 September 1984 – 27 September 1987	Ronald Victor Yeates	Adrian Coghan	27 September 1984
27 September 1984 – 27 September 1987	Ronald Victor Yeates	Peter Andrew Derwent	26 September 1985
27 September 1984 – 27 September 1987	Ronald Victor Yeates	Robert Webeck	29 September 1986
27 September 1987 – 1 September 1991	Richard Cleveland Lennon		
27 September 1987 – 1 September 1991	Richard Cleveland Lennon	Tony Hall	27 September 1987
27 September 1987 – 1 September 1991	Richard Cleveland Lennon	Richard Geddes	1 September 1989
27 September 1987 – 1 September 1991	Richard Cleveland Lennon	Malcolm Patterson	24 August 1990
1 September 1991 – 1 September 1996	Peter Andrew Derwent		
1 September 1991 – 1 September 1996	Peter Andrew Derwent	Robert Pallin	1 September 1991
1 September 1991 – 1 September 1996	Peter Andrew Derwent	Richard Geddes	1 September 1992
1 September 1991 – 1 September 1996	Peter Andrew Derwent	Robert Pallin	1 September 1994
1 September 1991 – 1 September 1996	Peter Andrew Derwent	David Roy Barnett	1 September 1995
1 September 1996 – 8 September 1998	Richard Geddes		
1 September 1996 – 8 September 1998	Richard Geddes	Tony Hall	1 September 1996
1 September 1996 – 8 September 1998	Richard Geddes	David Dobbin	9 September 1997
8 September 1998 – 21 September 1999	David Dobbin	Johanne Tobin	8 September 1998
21 September 1999 – 5 September 2000	Tony Hall	Laura Bennett	21 September 1999
5 September 2000 – 3 September 2002	Laura Bennett		
5 September 2000 – 3 September 2002	Laura Bennett	Ted Roach	5 September 2000
5 September 2000 – 3 September 2002	Laura Bennett	Ian Cross	4 September 2001
3 September 2002 – 13 April 2004	Ian Cross	Ian de Vulder	3 September 2002
13 April 2004 – 7 September 2005	Adrienne Ryan	Maureen Shelley	13 April 2004
7 September 2005 – September 2006	Elaine Malicki	Nick Ebbeck	7 September 2005
September 2006 – September 2008	Nick Ebbeck	Anita Andrew	September 2006
September 2008 – September 2010	Elaine Malicki	Jennifer Anderson	September 2008
September 2010 – 6 September 2011	Ian Cross	Jennifer Anderson	September 2010
6 September 2011 – September 2012	Jennifer Anderson	Elaine Malicki	6 September 2011
September 2012 – September 2013	Elaine Malicki	Cheryl Szatow	September 2012
September 2013 – 16 September 2015	Jennifer Anderson		
September 2013 – 16 September 2015	Jennifer Anderson	Elaine Malicki	September 2013
September 2013 – 16 September 2015	Jennifer Anderson	Chantelle Fornari-Orsmond	16 September 2014
16 September 2015 – 20 September 2016	Cheryl Szatow	David Ossip	16 September 2015
20 September 2016 – 21 September 2021	Jennifer Anderson		
20 September 2016 – 21 September 2021	Jennifer Anderson	David Ossip	20 September 2016
20 September 2016 – 21 September 2021	Jennifer Anderson	Callum Clarke	21 September 2017
20 September 2016 – 21 September 2021	Jennifer Anderson	Jeff Pettett	25 September 2018
20 September 2016 – 21 September 2021	Jennifer Anderson	Callum Clarke	18 September 2019
20 September 2016 – 21 September 2021	Jennifer Anderson	Cedric Spencer	22 September 2020
21 September 2021 – 11 January 2022	Cedric Spencer	Sam Ngai	21 September 2021
11 January 2022 – 19 September 2023	Jeff Pettett	Barbara Ward	11 January 2022
19 September 2023 – November 2024	Sam Ngai	Christine Kay	19 September 2023
November 2024 – 15 September 2026	Christine Kay	Kim Wheatley Martin Smith	November 2024
15 September 2026—present	Kim Wheatley	Matt Devlin	2026-2028
