= Office National =

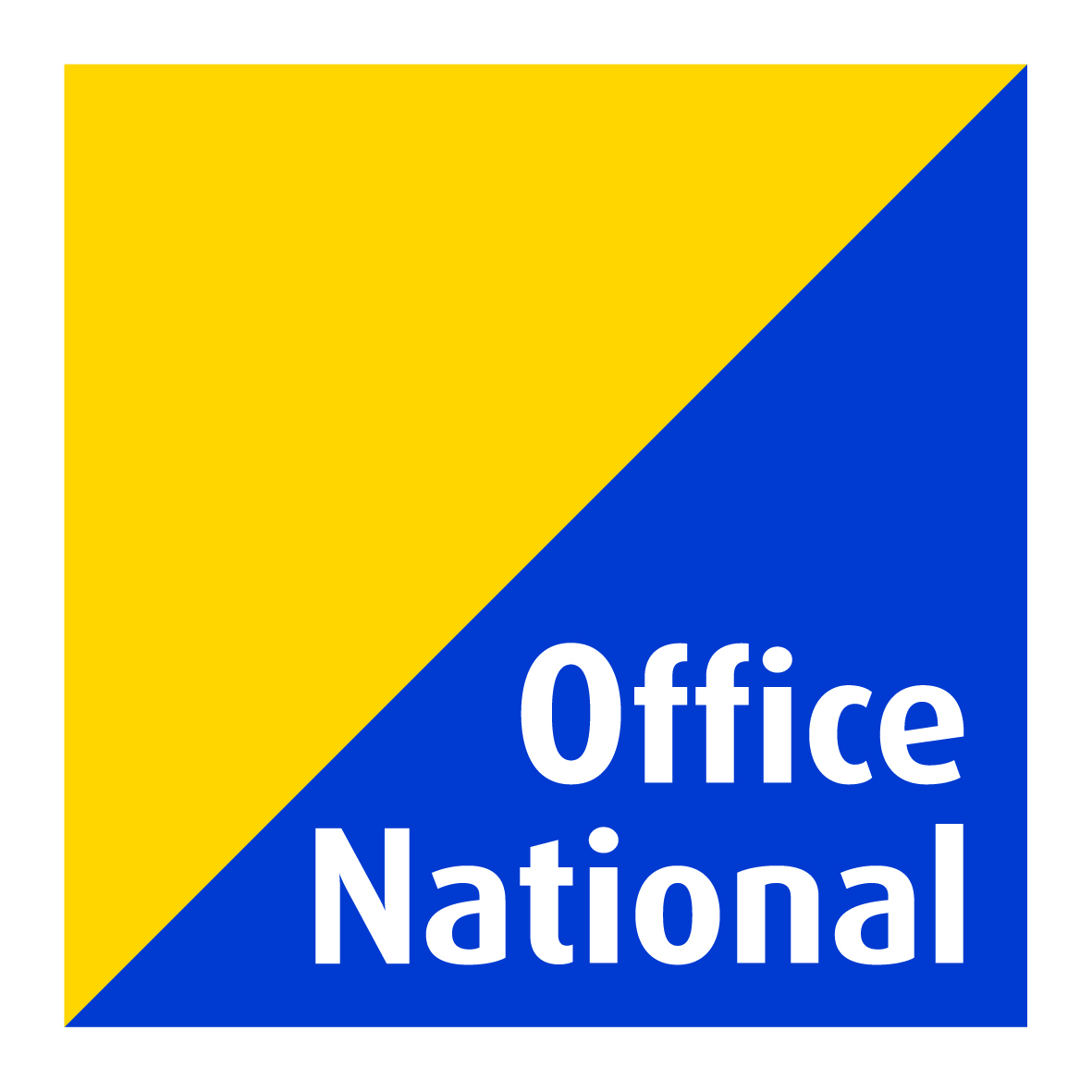

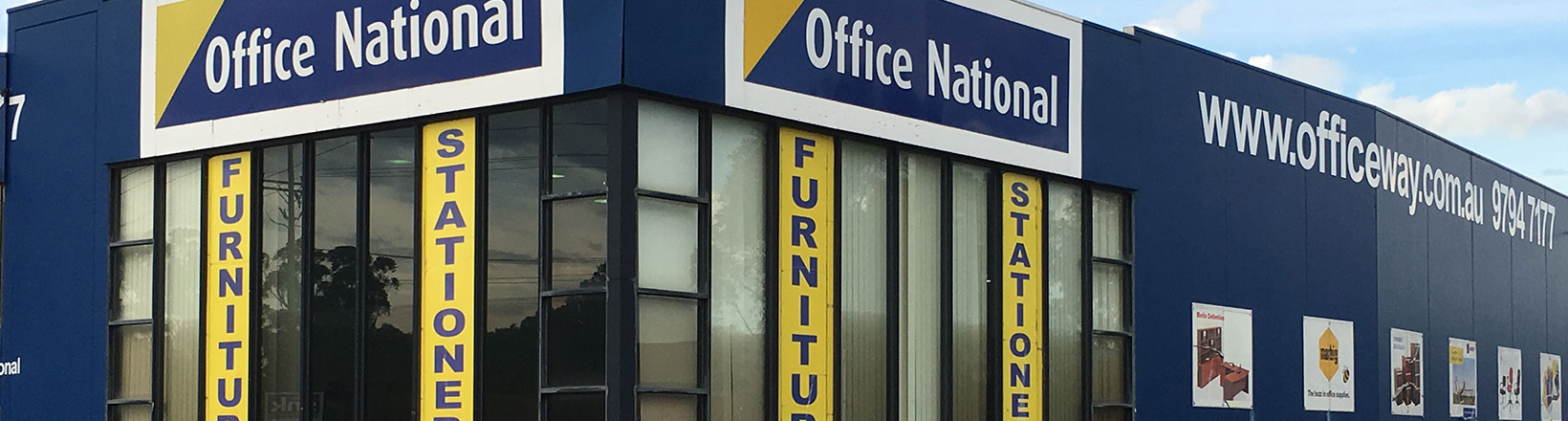
- An Office National storefront in Australia
- Type: Subsidiary
- Industry: Retail
- Founded: 1999
- Headquarters: Pymble, NSW, Australia, Australia
- Number of locations: 180
- Key people: David Spear (Chairman)
- Parent: Office Brands
- Website: www.officenational.com.au

Office National is an Australian network of independent office supply stores. It is the dealer brand of Office Brands, and the name dates back to 1999, with the formation of Office National Limited (which later became Office Brands). The head office is located in Pymble, a suburb of Sydney, NSW, Australia.

== History ==
Office Brands began as Office National Limited, which was formed by a merger between Office Force, Office Network, and A.P.T.

The company later launched two brands in Australia: Office Products Depot in 2003, and O-Net in 2009, a white-label brand that allowed for smaller independent stores to operate under the larger company without losing their existing brand.

Office National Limited underwent a name change in 2009, becoming Office Brands to reflect the two new additions to the company. The dealer brand became known as Office National from then on, retaining the name from the 1999 merger and adopting the slogan “Above & Beyond.”

== Business and products ==
Office National primarily sells general office supplies, but also other office-related goods such as furniture and promotional materials. Locations also typically offer custom printing.

== Achievements ==
Office National’s parent company, Office Brands, is the largest independent office supply group in Australia.

Office National did well in recent Stationery News Reseller and Supplier of the Year Awards. The 2016 winner in the metropolitan category was Office National Canning Vale, and the list of finalists for the 2017 awards includes five Office National locations.
