= Pymble Substation =

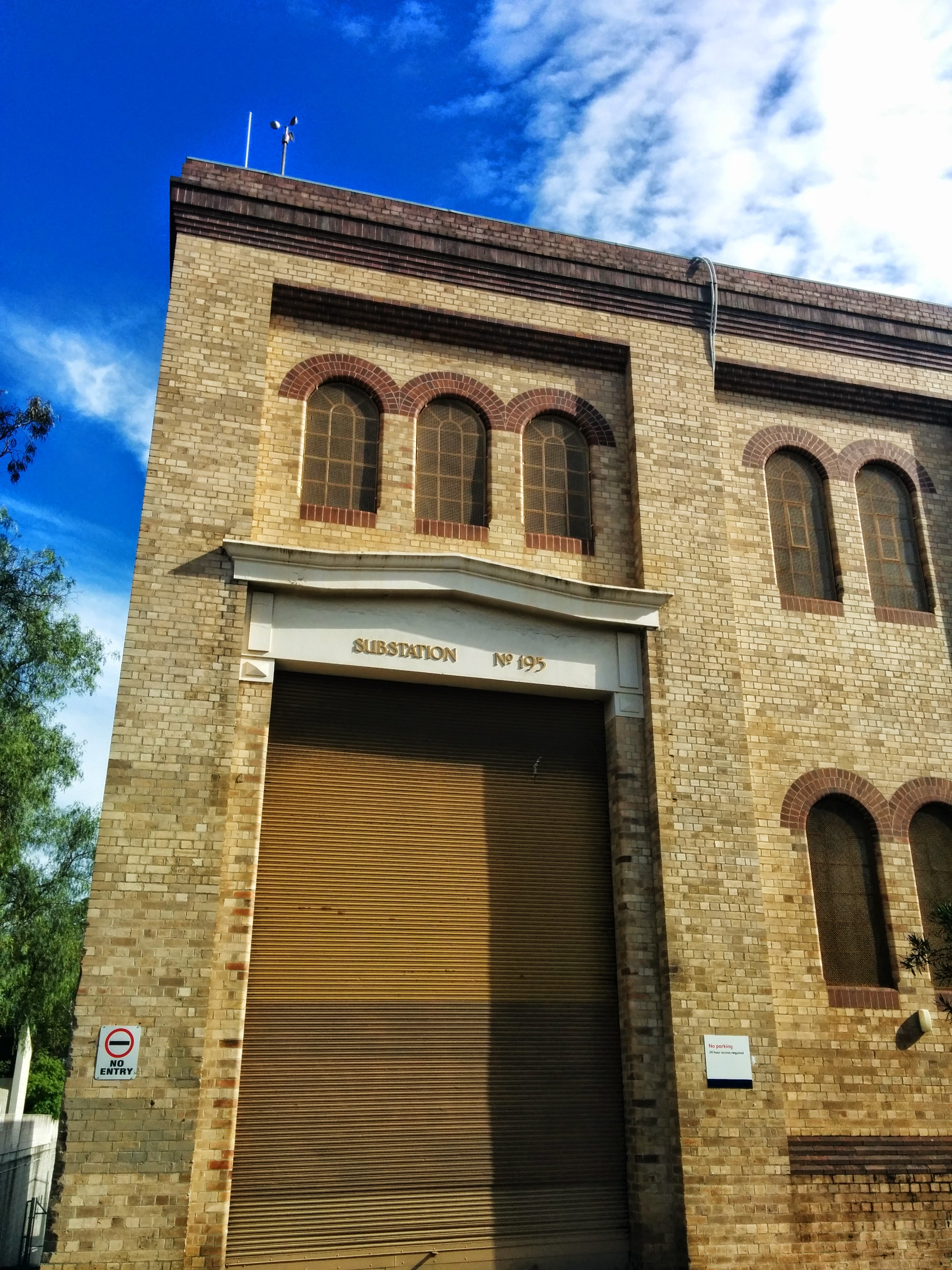

- Location within Sydney Location within Australia
- 33°44′56″S 151°08′42″E
- Location: 982–984 Pacific Highway, Pymble, Ku-ring-gai Council, New South Wales, Australia

History
- Built: 1926–1928

Site notes
- Owner: Ausgrid

New South Wales Heritage Register
- Official name: Pymble Substation; #195 Pymble 33KV Zone/Depot
- Type: State heritage (built)
- Designated: 2 April 1999
- Reference no.: 940
- Type: Electricity Transformer/Substation
- Category: Utilities – Electricity

The Pymble Substation is a heritage-listed electrical substation at 982–984 Pacific Highway, in the Sydney suburb of Pymble, in the Ku-ring-gai Council local government area of New South Wales, Australia. It was built from 1926 to 1928. It is also known as #195 Pymble 33KV Zone/Depot. The property is owned by Ausgrid, an agency of the Government of New South Wales. It was added to the New South Wales State Heritage Register on 2 April 1999.

== History ==
The Pymble Zone substation/depot is a purpose designed and built structure dating from 1928. "Substation No. 195, 1928" is written on the lintel pediments in relief. Historical period - 1926–1950

== Description ==
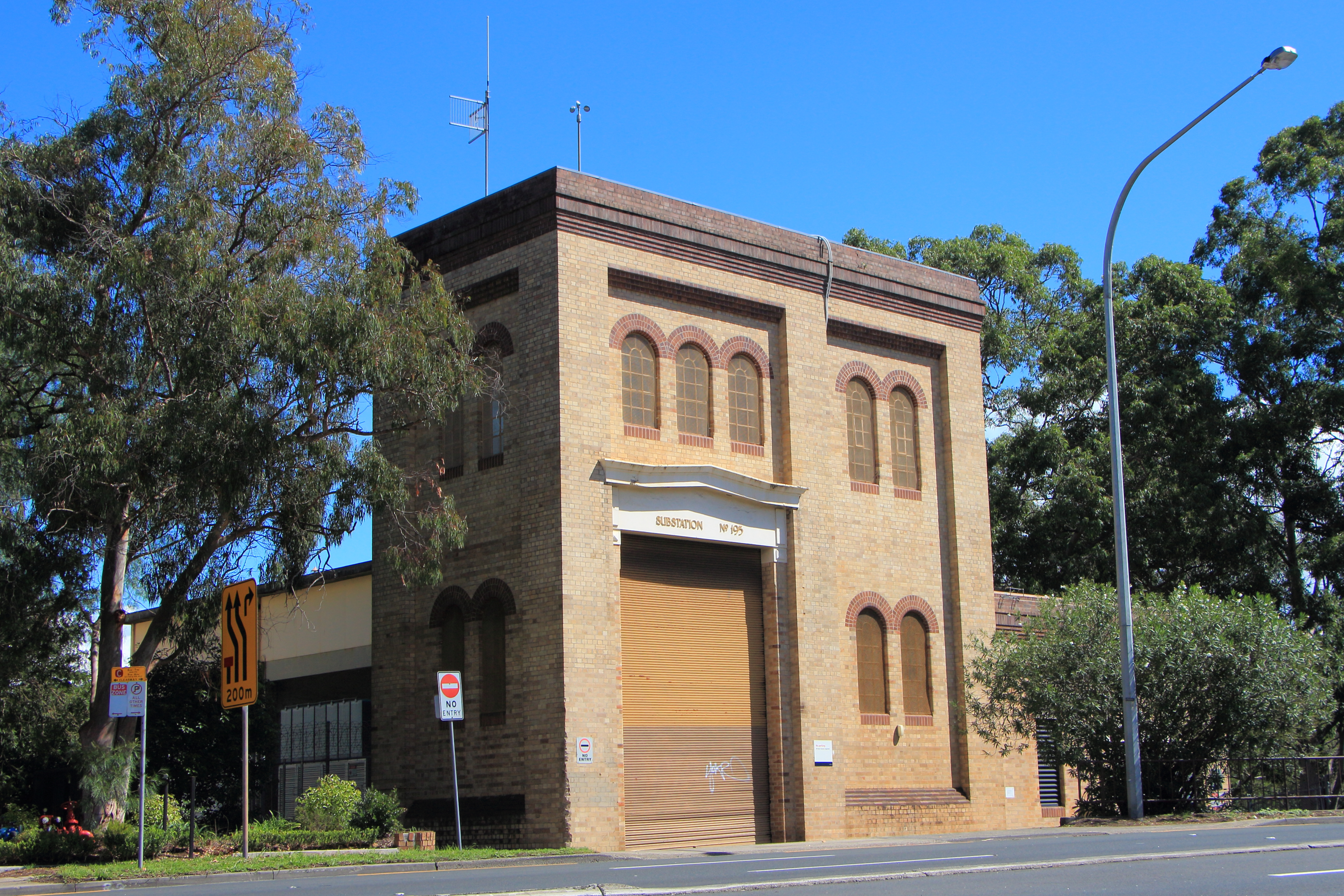

The Pymble Zone substation/depot is a large and elegant parapetted one and two storey structure with roofs of varying heights, round headed windows, and contrasting lintel pediments. It is a refined example of the Interwar Stripped Classical style as evidenced by the vertical emphasis, vestigial classical cornice and groupings of multi-paned windows. Stylistic elements also include recessed panels incorporating corbelled brickwork near the base and parapet levels, and decorative elements including contrasting brickwork and cement rendered lintel pediments.

Two large entrances with roller shutters provide access. The Pymble Zone substation/depot is constructed in load-bearing face brick with externally expressed engaged piers. The windows make use of brick arch construction.

The sustain is completed in the Interwar Stripped Classical architectural style. Exterior materials used include face brick, cement render, and steel roller shutter.

=== Condition ===
As at 8 November 2000, the substation condition was good.

== Heritage listing ==
As at 21 October 1998, the Pymble Zone substation/depot is an elegant and refined example of a well detailed face brick substation building designed in the Interwar period. It is considered to be of State significance and a rare and representative example of this style of substation building.

Substation was listed on the New South Wales State Heritage Register on 2 April 1999.

== See also ==
- Australian non-residential architectural styles
- Ausgrid
