= Pymble Reservoirs No. 1 and No. 2 =

Heritage listed water reservoirs in Pymble, NSW, Australia

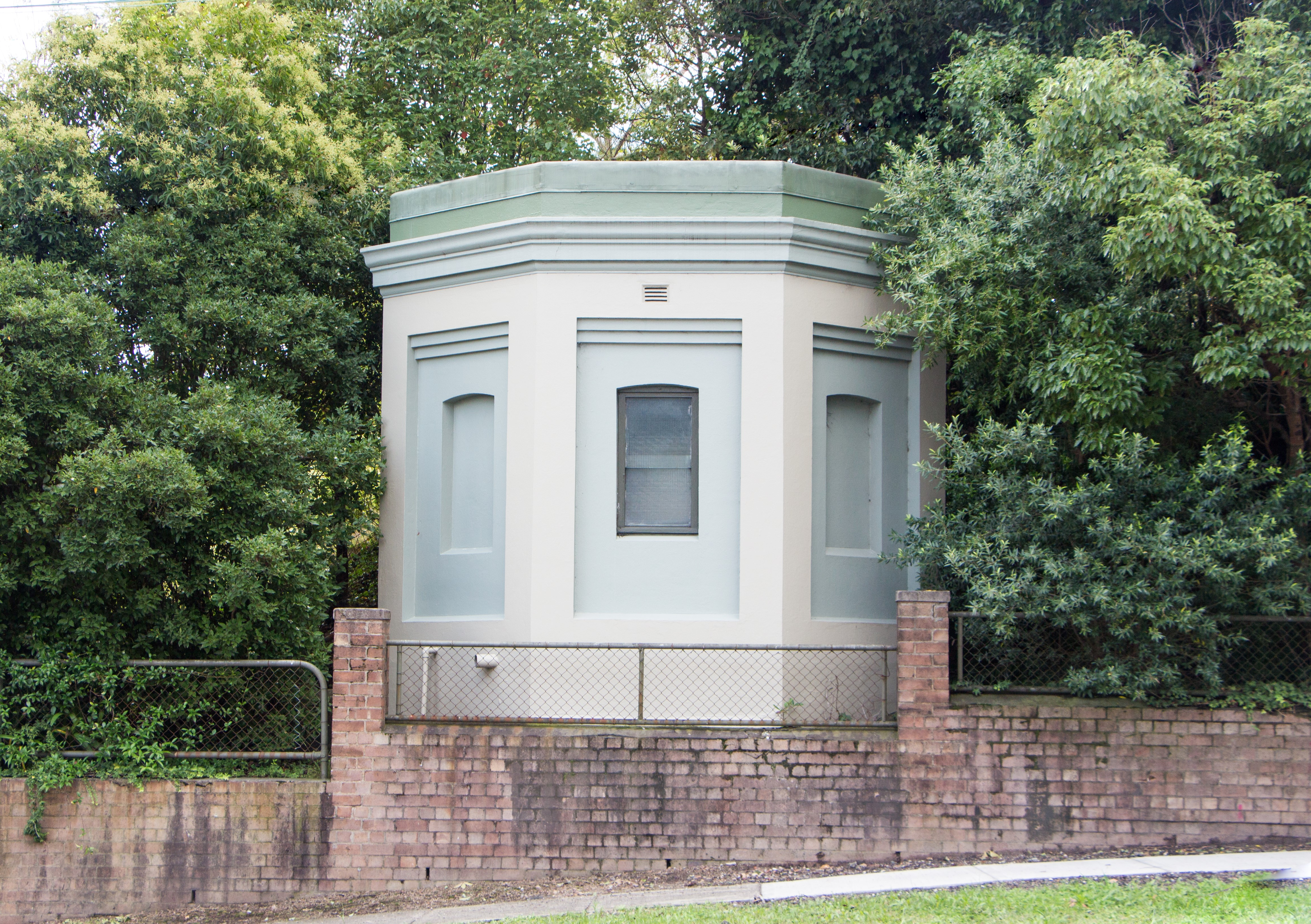
- Pymble Reservoir No. 1 valve house

- Location within Sydney Location within Australia
- 33°44′29″S 151°08′21″E
- Location: Pacific Highway, Pymble, Ku-ring-gai Council, New South Wales, Australia

History
- Built: 1900
- Built for: Metropolitan Board of Water Supply and Sewerage

Site notes
- Owner: Sydney Water

New South Wales Heritage Register
- Official name: Pymble Reservoir No. 1 (Covered) (WS 0097); (WS 0097); Pymble Reservoir No.2 (Covered) (WS 0098); (WS 0098)
- Type: State heritage (built)
- Designated: 15 November 2002
- Reference no.: 1632; 1633
- Type: Water Supply Reservoir/Dam
- Category: Utilities – Water

The Pymble Reservoirs No. 1 and No. 2 are two heritage-listed reservoirs located at Pacific Highway in the Sydney suburb of Pymble in the Ku-ring-gai Council local government area of New South Wales, Australia. The reservoirs are also known as Pymble Reservoir No. 1 (Covered) (WS 0097) and (WS 0097); and Pymble Reservoir No. 2 (Covered) (WS 0098) and (WS 0098). The property is owned by Sydney Water, a State-owned statutory corporation of the Government of New South Wales. The reservoirs were added to the New South Wales State Heritage Register on 15 November 2002.

== History ==
=== Northern Suburbs Supply ===
When the Board of Water Supply and Sewerage took over from Sydney City Council in 1888, the only supply to the northern suburbs was by a submarine main from Dawes Point to Milsons Point, taking water by gravitation from Paddington Reservoir. The level of Paddington Reservoir limited supply to the lower areas of Northern Suburbs.

In 1888, in order to overcome this problem, the Board erected a pumping station in Junction Street, North Sydney, with two storage tanks in the grounds of St. Thomas' Church, to meet demand for the higher parts of North Sydney. The plant was dismantled in 1892, the pump being transferred to Carlton and the tanks to Wahroonga. The above submarine main was abandoned in 1917.

In 1892 the Ryde Pumping Station was commissioned, supplied by mains from Potts Hill (via Rookwood Cemetery, along the Concord Peninsula and attached to the 1889 railway bridge at Meadowbank), with reservoirs at Ryde Pumping Station (disused 1930) and Ryde Hill and then by mains to a pair of reservoirs at Chatswood (previously constructed in 1888).

With increasing population of the North Shore, brought about by the construction of the railway, new storage reservoirs were required. The tanks, originally at N Sydney, were transferred to Wahroonga in 1896. A steam powered pumping station was erected at Chatswood in 1895 for the supply of Wahroonga. A new steel surface reservoir was constructed at Wahroonga in 1898. From Wahroonga the main from Chatswood extended to Hornsby, with a branch to Thornleigh and Beecroft.

Both Pymble Reservoir No. 1 and Pymble Reservoir No. 2 were constructed in 1900 to meet local supply.

The mains from Chatswood to Wahroonga had deteriorated by 1905, necessitating new direct mains from Ryde to Wahroonga, and from Chatswood to Pymble to connect to the former main.

== Description ==
=== Reservoir No. 1 ===
Pymble Reservoir No.1 (Covered) (WS 97) is a circular brick covered reservoir with an octagonal brick entrance chamber constructed at the centre of its roof. The entrance chamber has a conical Marseilles tile roof. The reservoir has cast iron roof ventilation caps, as at Petersham Reservoir (Covered) (WS 89), Waverley Reservoir No. 1 (Covered) (WS 132) and the Randwick Reservoir (WS 001).

Adjacent to the reservoir, on the Telegraph Road frontage is an octagonal valve house, of rendered brick, with parapet and flat roof. The valve house has a steel grated floor and an access ladder to the valve below.

Plantings include oleander.

The site is occupied by the Pymble Bowling Club clubhouse, while the adjacent covered reservoir (Pymble Reservoir No. 2 (Covered) (WS 98)) is used as the bowling green for the club. The recreational and open space usage of the roof of the reservoir is a historical and important feature of most covered reservoirs.

The full service level of Pymble Reservoir No.1 (Covered) (WS 97) is 173 metres (568 ft) and its capacity is 2.3 megalitres (81×10^{3} cu ft).

=== Reservoir No. 2 ===
Pymble Reservoir No. 2 (Covered) (WS 98) is a fine example of a concrete covered reservoir in an earthen embankment, or partly excavated into rock. The roof of the reservoir is grassed over and is now used as bowling greens by Pymble Bowling Club.

The only apparent sign of the covered reservoir from the bowling greens is the pair of ventilation shafts in the likeness of cast iron gateposts, similar to those erected at Waverley Reservoir No. 2 (Covered) (WS 133). The recreational and open space usage of the roof of the reservoir is a historical and important feature of most covered reservoirs.

The south side of the reservoir is the location for three valve houses, one large example, central to the side, with two smaller valve houses flanking it. Each valve house is constructed in rendered brick, with parapet and flat roof, the walls cut into the embankment of the reservoir. All the valve houses contain original valves and control gear. The main valve house contains provision for six valves and control mechanisms, some of which have been updated. The two flanking valve houses have a pair of valves and control gear. The original valve control gear is similar to that at Petersham Reservoir (Covered) (WS 89).

The full service level of Pymble Reservoir No. 2 (Covered) (WS 98) is 173 metres (568 ft) and its capacity is 31 megalitres (1.1×10^{6} cu ft).

=== Modifications and dates ===
Pool-type fencing added in the late 20th century.

== Heritage listing ==
As at 2 December 2002, Pymble Reservoirs No. 1 (Covered) and No. 2 (Covered) are two reservoirs of a small group of covered reservoirs. Together they demonstrate the variation and development in construction technology and the high level of engineering skill available to the MWS&DB.

The two reservoirs on the Pacific Highway at Pymble form an important group of covered reservoirs, integral with fine examples of valve houses. The valve houses preserve their original valve control gear, which is extremely rare in the SWC system.

All covered reservoirs are highly significant within the Sydney system, since all differ in construction technology, design and architectural detailing. All therefore contribute to our understanding of the development of covered reservoirs in NSW.

The listing includes both the reservoirs and all associated features, pipework, valves and valve houses to the property boundary.

Pymble Reservoirs No. 1 and No. 2 were listed on the New South Wales State Heritage Register on 15 November 2002 having satisfied the following criteria.

The place is important in demonstrating the course, or pattern, of cultural or natural history in New South Wales.

This reservoirs demonstrate the high level of demand by a populous suburban community.

This reservoirs or site demonstrates the amplification in demand due to growing population.

The place is important in demonstrating aesthetic characteristics and/or a high degree of creative or technical achievement in New South Wales.

The two reservoirs on the Pacific Highway at Pymble form an important group of covered reservoirs, integral with fine examples of valve houses, most of which preserve their original valve control gear.

The place has potential to yield information that will contribute to an understanding of the cultural or natural history of New South Wales.

This reservoirs demonstrate the broad range of construction techniques and high level of technical expertise available for covered reservoir construction.

All covered reservoirs are highly significant within the Sydney Water system, since all differ in construction technology, design and architectural detailing. All therefore contribute to our understanding of the development of covered reservoirs in NSW.

The place possesses uncommon, rare or endangered aspects of the cultural or natural history of New South Wales.

One of a small group of large covered reservoirs in brick or concrete, each demonstrating differences in construction, design and architectural detailing.

== See also ==
- List of reservoirs and dams in New South Wales
- Sydney Water
