= WildThings =

WildThings is an urban fauna translocation program in the Australian state of New South Wales developed by Ku-ring-gai Council in 2004 to protect, promote and proliferate wildlife in the Ku-ring-gai local government area.

== Program background ==
It was noticed in Ku-ring-gai that while bush regenerators intended to preserve habitat and wildlife, in practice some Bushcare Groups were responsible for the wholesale removal of weeds which often lessened the biodiversity value of the ecosystem that the volunteers were trying to protect.

In New South Wales, where Ku-ring-gai is located, the state government has many regulations that effectively deny people the opportunity to have native animals for pets. On their web page they have detailed their objections.

In an attempt to create positive relationships between people and wildlife, the program WildThings was created; however due to the restrictive legislative environment around mammals, the program has concentrated on invertebrates, fish and reptiles.

== Initiatives ==
There are two main components to WildThings:

- The placement of Trigona carbonaria hives. This program places native bee hives on residential properties, assisting with pollination while increasing awareness of this insect. As of 2011, over 200 hives have been distributed.
- The conversion of unwanted swimming pools into ponds. Baby boomers, in particular, have pools that are no longer being used. Studies conducted by the University of Western Sydney, on a random selection of converted ponds, showed they promote invertebrate biodiversity and their water quality is suitable for recreational use. An added bonus is that a converted pool is essentially a rainwater tank without a lid, making large amounts of water available for a variety of activities around the home, saving potable water, electricity and eliminating the need for chemicals.
