= Eric Pratten House =

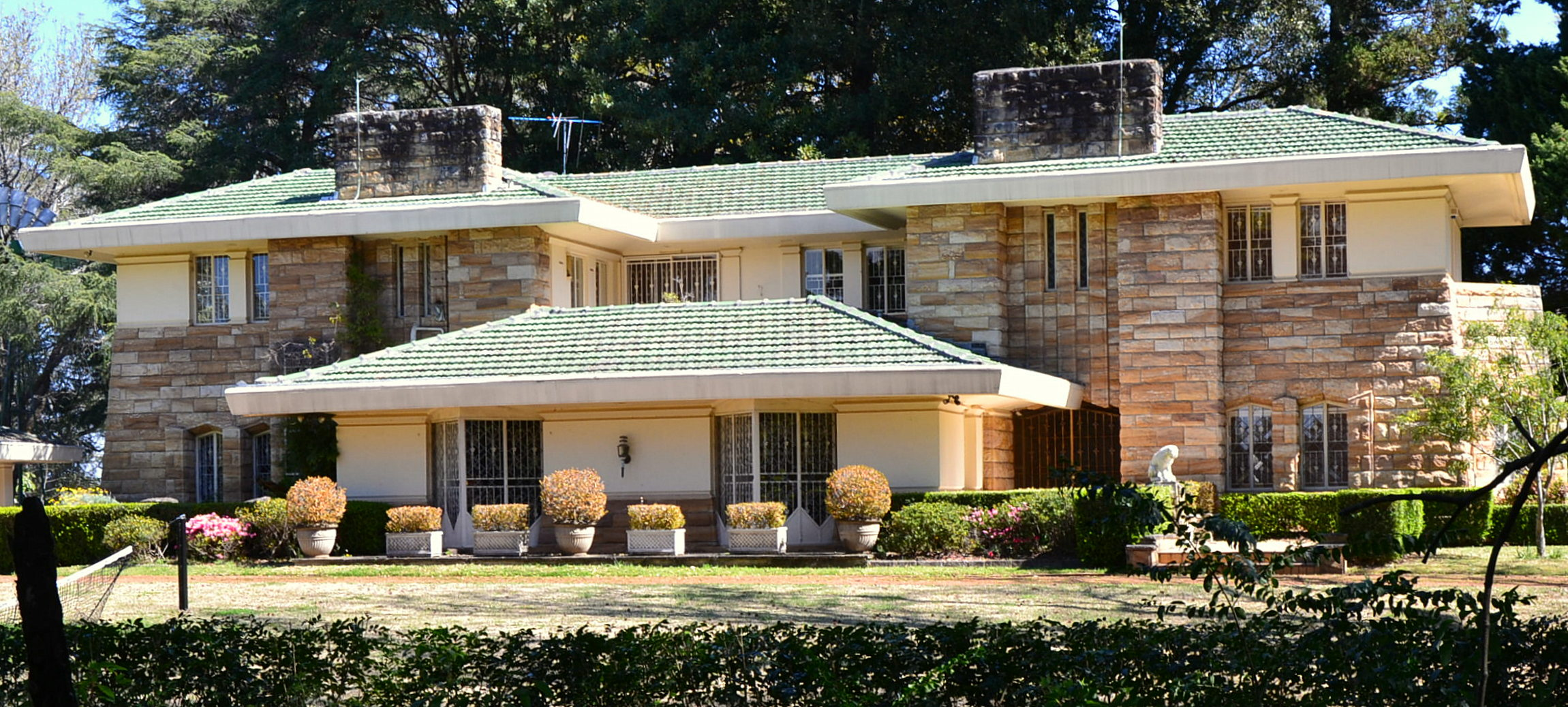
- Walter Burley Griffin home Coppins, or the Eric Pratten House.

- Location within Sydney Location within Australia
- 33°44′25″S 151°08′34″E
- Location: 29 Telegraph Road, Pymble, Ku-ring-gai Council, New South Wales, Australia

History
- Built: 1935–1936

Site notes
- Architect: Walter Burley Griffin
- Architectural style: International / Modern

New South Wales Heritage Register
- Official name: Eric Pratten House; Coppins; Crompton
- Type: State heritage (built)
- Designated: 22 December 2000
- Reference no.: 1443
- Type: House
- Category: Residential buildings (private)

The Eric Pratten House is a heritage-listed residence located at 29 Telegraph Road in the Sydney suburb of Pymble, New South Wales, Australia. It was designed by Walter Burley Griffin and built from 1935 to 1936. It is also known as Coppins and Crompton. It was added to the New South Wales State Heritage Register on 22 December 2000.

== History ==
Robert Pymble, a settler and orchardist, was granted 240 hectares (600 acres) by the Crown in the parish (as later defined) of Gordon in 1823. Unlike many grantees of his time, Pymble became a permanent resident and pioneer of the region. He retained most of his estate for most of his life. It was not until 1882, when the district was beginning to expand to accommodate upper class dwellers from the city, that large-scale alienation of the Pymble properties took place. The projected building of the North Shore railway (begun in 1887 and opened from St Leonards to Hornsby in 1890) was a powerful incentive for development.

In 1883, Pymble sold two large blocks, totalling 40 hectares (100 acres), on Lane Cove Road and on the junction of a government road (later Telegraph Road). The subject block of 1.2 hectares (3 acres) on Telegraph Road was sold to a medical doctor, Dr Walter O'Reilly, in 1883. O'Reilly and his wife and family heirs retained the land, building on a portion of it, until they began to dispose of it in the 1920s.

In 1922 O'Reilly's widow and sons sold the Graham Avenue portion to James Kebblewhite, merchant. Kebblewhite's widow and son sold it to Eric Herbert Pratten in 1934. The adjacent portion (in respect of its south section) was acquired by Pratten in 1939.

Eric Pratten's father, Frederick was a printer, engineer and politician who had settled in Telegraph Road. Herbert Pratten and his half brother Frederick had migrated from England to Australia and started Pratten Brothers Printing. They were a successful firm, and were also involved in mining and manufacturing. Herbert Pratten became a leading national politician. He built a large house for his family in Telegraph Road.

After Frederick's two sons, Eric and David had married in the early 1930s, their father gave them land in Telegraph Road and funds to build a house to their own design. It is believed that the two brothers were inspired after seeing Cameron House in Marion Street, Killara, designed by Walter Burley Griffin (completed in 1933). Both Eric and David Pratten commissioned Griffin to design their houses.

In 1935, before the second (and final) set of plans for Eric's house were completed, Griffin left Australia for India where, after an extraordinary burst of creativity, he died in 1937. Eric's house, known as Coppins, was finished and construction supervised by Griffin's partner and former assistant, Eric Nicholls. Although a disciple of Griffin and a sharer of his Anthroposophical beliefs, Nicholls was obliged to modify some of Griffin's symbolism for the client. It seems to be accepted opinion that the result is similar to work that Griffin had done in Frank Lloyd Wright's studio in Chicago, reminiscent of the Prairie School (of architecture).

The David Pratten house at the corner of Telegraph Road and Mona Vale Road, opposite his uncle Herbert's family house, was the third Griffin design for the site. The first two schemes were single storey flat roofed residences with stone rubble walls featuring typical Griffin design elements such as projecting panels of stonework over the window openings. The client eventually approved a more conventional design with a low-pitched hip and gable ended roof form. Nicholls also supervised the construction of this house after Griffin's departure for India. The David Pratten house features a circular lounge which projects as a single storey bay from the rectangular plan. The curved bay of the lounge is reflected in the semi circular terrace, which extends the house into the garden. Unfortunately this house has since been remodelled with loss of much of the original Griffin decorative treatment.

Authorities are divided on the place of these last houses designed by Griffin in Australia. To Peter Harrison (1995), they "did not afford Griffin much satisfaction...far removed from the domestic retreats in which he delighted." A more sympathetic estimate is in the Powerhouse Museum volume: 'although designed at the highpoint of Griffin's Steiner phase and incorporating some Steiner motifs, [the Eric Pratten House] is in fact a reprise of the central design problem of the Griffins' Chicago years: how to create a radical house for a conservative client.'.

=== Landscape ===
The gardens of the estate include several formal and informal garden elements that result from a landscape concept for the estate. There is a deliberate and considered relationship between these elements and the design of the main house. The layout of the large garden elements are arranged in response to the house's planning and fenestration. These elements, e.g.: the swimming pool terrace, the rose garden and the sunken courtyard, are aligned along significant axes with the house. The development and construction of the estate was progressive, with the final large elements, i.e.: the swimming pool, being constructed approximately 15 years after completion of the house.

Following an interview with the original owners, it has since been learnt that the initial garden was done in collaboration with a designer named Campbell from New Zealand. It appears that the garden design and spatial arrangement was worked out with the construction of the house. The later larger elements were designed by John Suttor of Suttor & Cox. It is very possible that Suttor used design details from Griffin's work on the house, stone wall and entry gate to tie in these later garden elements to the house and the original garden features.

The design of the house is evidence that the initial siting of the house and the planned outlook of the rooms, were designed by Griffin to take command of the site, as well as to focus on the house as the principal feature of the landscape. The house was deliberately located with its back to the west, on a knoll at the corner where the two original lots met. This was the only position allowing the house and the rooms within to interact with all areas of the site, while taking advantage of the views. The location of the house was also likely to have considered the future uses of the various areas of the garden, and catered to the formal/public and private needs of the various users.

The place conveys the stylistic cohesiveness notable in Griffin's work, and is particularly significant as the house stands within large formal grounds with a sunken garden, tennis court and pool - even the dog kennel was designed by Griffin. Many mature trees, most considered to be part of the original planting layout, have survived. Griffin scholars believe that the complexity of the garden layout suggests that Marion Mahony, Griffin's wife, may have been responsible for its design.

The house was sold after Eric Pratten died in the mid 1960sand was purchased by the Denning family who occupied it until 2000. During that time little fundamental change was made to the house although some of the bathrooms and the kitchen were up-dated. The gardens were also amended somewhat without changing the main features of the house and its relationship to the garden.

In December 2000 the property was subdivided and placed on the State Heritage Register. It was subsequently sold in 2001 to property developer Michael Kwok. In 2010 Kwok tried to sell it for over $8.5m. In June 2012 the estate was listed for sale by HSBC Bank after Kwok's bankruptcy. Among his failed Australian business ventures was the Fairmont Resort at Leura. In February 2013 one of the two blocks in this estate (5,716 square metres (61,530 sq ft) with the house and pool) sold. The other "garden" block (3,927 square metres (42,270 sq ft), with tennis court, outbuildings and rear drive) remains on the real estate market.

== Description ==
The house is set within a large corner site of 9,647 square metres (103,840 sq ft) on two titles. The Telegraph Road section of the site is fairly level, but Graham Avenue falls about 5 metres (16 ft) from Telegraph Road. The house is sited near the western boundary on the highest part of the site. It is approached via a long gravel drive. The drive terminates at the stone and tile garage, which has similar detail to the main house. There is a secondary pedestrian entrance from Telegraph Road along a path behind the house to the kitchen and garage. The south-eastern part of the site drops off and a large pool is located there. It is not visually obvious from the house or the entrance. To the west of the pool and behind the garage is a private courtyard area defined by stone walls and largely screened from view due to the fall of the site.

The site contains many large mature trees, believed to be part of Griffin's original planting layout. The site is located behind a high stone wall, which is covered by a vine. The house is almost totally obscured from view due to the number of large mature trees on the site and also on the footpath along Telegraph Road.

The design elements of the house demonstrate some of Steiner's ideas about spirituality and the concepts of anthroposophy. The house is formed from carefully articulated sandstone masses with battered walls, angular prows and deep reveals set beneath a series of sailing roofs in a re-interpretation of the Wrightian Prairie house. The ground floor window reveals, cut into the stone batters, have lintels dressed in a low triangular motif. The effect is somewhat Tudor Gothic, but is also reminiscent of the trapezoidal windows, which characterize Steiner's work. The Eric Pratten house is designed at the high point of Griffin's Steiner phase incorporating some of Steiner's motifs.

=== Landscape ===
The gardens of the estate include several formal and informal garden elements that result from a landscape concept for the estate. There is a deliberate and considered relationship between these elements and the design of the main house. The layout of the large garden elements are arranged in response to the house's planning and fenestration. These elements, e.g.: the swimming pool terrace, the rose garden and the sunken courtyard, are aligned along significant axes with the house. The development and construction of the estate was progressive, with the final large elements, i.e.: the swimming pool, being constructed approximately 15 years after completion of the house.

Following an interview with the original owners, it has since been learnt that the initial garden was done in collaboration with a designer named Campbell from New Zealand. It appears that the garden design and spatial arrangement was worked out with the construction of the house. The later larger elements were designed by John Suttor of Suttor & Cox. It is very possible that Suttor used design details from Griffin's work on the house, stone wall and entry gate to tie in these later garden elements to the house and the original garden features.

The design of the house is evidence that the initial siting of the house and the planned outlook of the rooms, were designed by Griffin to take command of the site, as well as to focus on the house as the principal feature of the landscape. The house was deliberately located with its back to the west, on a knoll at the corner where the two original lots met. This was the only position allowing the house and the rooms within to interact with all areas of the site, while taking advantage of the views. The location of the house was also likely to have considered the future uses of the various areas of the garden, and catered to the formal/public and private needs of the various users.

The place conveys the stylistic cohesiveness notable in Griffin's work, and is particularly significant as the house stands within large formal grounds with a sunken garden, tennis court and pool - even the dog kennel was designed by Griffin. Many mature trees, most considered to be part of the original planting layout, have survived. Griffin scholars believe that the complexity of the garden layout suggests that Marion Mahony, Griffin's wife, may have been responsible for its design.

The site is occupied by the following:

- a formal entry sequence, featuring double wrought-iron entry gates opening onto a curving gravel driveway with gradually revealed vistas leading to the house;
- the residence;
- formal presentation gardens, including formal expanses of lawn, a series of garden rooms and terraces, located north and east of the house;
- a sunken courtyard garden with lily pond north of the house;
- recreational features in the southern part of the gardens, including a swimming pool and terrace, tennis court, linked by an entertainment courtyard containing the changing pavilion and barbeque area. The swimming pool terrace and tennis court feature extensive sandstone battered walling and there is a pump room and boiler next to the sandstone retaining wall below the swimming pool next to the semi-circular apse;
- a productive garden including a glass house, various sheds, vegetable/fruit beds and composting pits south of the garage;
- various structures south of the garage - i.e.: the dog kennel and run, various aviaries, a timber bird house and various garden sheds;
- a service entry corridor from Telegraph Rd. located along the western boundary on the western side of the house, leading to the rear kitchen entry to the house;
- windmill and a header water tank on a tall stand west of the garage and house;
- a gardener's lodge located next (west) to the tennis court;
- a grazing paddock with tall forest trees, to the west of the tennis court and gardener's lodge;
- remnants of a rear driveway, i.e.: sandstone edging and split-face pavers from the garage to the south-west corner of the site;
- various sandstone retaining walls;
- sandstone boundary walls, set with wrought iron pedestrian gates, and topped with wrought iron fences.

=== Condition ===
As at 28 August 2006, no known archaeological potential.

The place is particularly significant as the house stands within large formal grounds with a sunken garden, tennis court and pool - even the dog kennel was designed by Griffin. Many mature trees, most considered to be part of the original planting layout, have survived. Griffin scholars believe that the complexity of the garden layout suggests that Marion Mahony, Griffin's wife, may have been responsible for its design.

=== Modifications and dates ===
- 1934-5: first land parcel bought, house designed and built. Garden elements likely to have been constructed were: sunken courtyard; driveway including wrought iron entry gates; garden beds and plantings along Telegraph Rd. boundary and driveway; squared off area of lawn adjacent to driveway and front rooms, later to hold the flag pole; garage; stone wall and steps beside garage; windmill; tank stand;
- 1939: second land parcel with rear access to Taunton St. & Pymble Station purchased.
- by 1943: driveway, garage, tank stand, windmill, sunken courtyard and front gardens all established; squared off area of lawn adjacent to front rooms bound by hedge established; beginnings of productive garden south of garage; level area of lawn south-east of house (used to corral the daughter's horse);
- by 1947: terraces along eastern boundary adjacent to Graham Ave. established; productive garden and utility area south of garage well established; informal path from garage to rear entry to site at Taunton St. established;
- by 1951: gardener's lodge and tennis court established; retaining wall of swimming pool terrace in construction - central apse to wall built (1951 aerial photo); service driveway established from rear of garage; skirting productive garden and tennis court to Taunton Ave. entrance;
- by 1956: features and layout of garden (as visible in present day (2002) are well established; swimming pool terrace and axial path to house, changing pavilion constructed;
- by 1961: glasshouse built behind garage.
- 1960s-2000: some of the bathrooms and the kitchen were up-dated. The gardens were also amended somewhat
- 2002: unapproved works undertaken:
  - a new (non) boundary fence built (potentially a new boundary fence);
  - new plants planted and established (altering current boundary structures);
  - new watering system installed; and
  - five bathrooms gutted.

=== Further information ===
Nominated by Ku-ring-gai Council with support of Walter Burley Griffin Society.

== Heritage listing ==
As at 9 January 2008, the Eric Pratten house is important as Griffin's largest domestic commission in Australia. It was one of his last works before leaving Australia for India and completed by his associate, Nicholls. It is one of three large Griffin houses in Ku-ring-gai. The Eric Pratten house is important as a large Griffin designed residence, which includes the house within its garden setting. It is rare, as the majority of his residential commissions in Australia are relatively small houses, typically one storey. The house demonstrates a high level of technical competence and excellence, particularly related to stone construction in Australia during the 1930s.

Eric Pratten House was listed on the New South Wales State Heritage Register on 22 December 2000 having satisfied the following criteria.

The place is important in demonstrating the course, or pattern, of cultural or natural history in New South Wales.

The Eric Pratten house is important as Griffin's largest domestic commission in Australia. It was one of his last works before leaving Australia for India and completed by his associate, Nicholls. It is one of three large Griffin houses in Ku-ring-gai.

Griffin is one of the most influential architects to work in Australia, coming here after his winning design for Canberra. Griffin had a very prolific career in Australia, designing a wide range of buildings from small shelters, houses, utilitarian buildings such as incinerators, major buildings such as Newman College, whole suburbs and towns. A noted characteristic of his work is a close connection with the Australian landscape. His later work is influenced strongly by Steiner's philosophies and the belief in anthroposophy.

Donald Lesley Johnson, in his book "The Architecture of Walter Burley Griffin", holds the view that this house is a disappointment because it seems antithetical to the philosophies of architecture, landscape design and planning Griffin formulated and practised during his stay in Australia.

The place is important in demonstrating aesthetic characteristics and/or a high degree of creative or technical achievement in New South Wales.

The Eric Pratten house is important as a large Griffin designed residence, which includes the house within its garden setting. It is rare, as the majority of his residential commissions in Australia are relatively small houses, typically one storey.

The house, formed from carefully articulated sandstone masses with battered walls, angular prows and deep reveals set beneath a series of sailing roofs in a re-interpretation of the Wrightian Prairie house. The design elements of the house demonstrate Griffin's ideas about spirituality influenced by Steiner and the concepts of anthroposophy. The Eric Pratten house is designed at the high point of Griffin's Steiner phase.

The house demonstrates a high level of technical competence and excellence, particularly related to stone construction in Australia during the 1930s.

== See also ==
- Australian residential architectural styles
- Herbert Pratten
