= Ku-ring-gai Council =

- Local government area
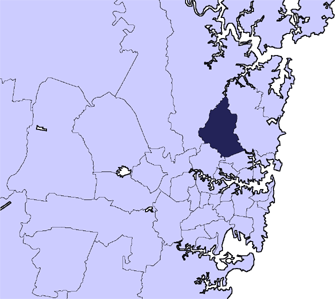
- Location in Metropolitan Sydney

- Interactive map of Ku-ring-gai Council
- Coordinates: 33°45′15″S 151°09′06″E
- Country: Australia
- State: New South Wales
- Region: North Shore
- Established: 6 March 1906 (Shire); 22 September 1928 (Municipality)
- Council seat: Gordon

Government
  - Mayor: Kim Wheatley (Independent)
  - State electorates: Davidson; Wahroonga
  - Federal divisions: Bradfield; Berowra (Note: Only Wahroonga streets of Mount Pleasant Avenue and Waratah Way)

Area
  - Total: 85.44 km^{2} (32.99 sq mi)

Population
  - Total: 126,983 (ERP (Note: Meaning "Estimated Resident Population".) 2023)
  - Density: 1,486/km^{2} (3,850/sq mi)
- Website: Ku-ring-gai Council
LGAs around Ku-ring-gai Council
Hornsby	Hornsby	Northern Beaches
Ryde	Ku-ring-gai Council	Northern Beaches
Ryde	Willoughby	Willoughby

Ku-ring-gai Council is a local government area in Northern Sydney (Upper North Shore), in the state of New South Wales, Australia. The area is named after an Aboriginal language group.

Major transport routes through the area include the Pacific Highway and North Shore railway line. Because of its good soils and elevated position as part of the Hornsby Plateau, Ku-ring-gai was originally covered by a large area of dry sclerophyll forest, parts of which still remain and form a component of the Ku-ring-gai Chase National Park. There are also many domestic gardens in the residential parts of Ku-ring-gai.

The Mayor of Ku-ring-gai Council is Cr. Kim Wheatley an independent politician, elected from amongst her follow councillors in September 2026.

The council comprises an area of 86 square kilometres (33 sq mi), and as at the 2021 census, had an estimated population of 124,076. Ku-ring-gai is the most advantaged area in Australia to live in, at the top of the Index of Relative Socio-economic Advantage and Disadvantage (IRSAD).

== Suburbs and localities in the local government area ==
Suburbs and localities serviced by Ku-ring-gai Council are:

- East Killara
- East Lindfield
- Fox Valley
- Gordon
- Killara
- Lindfield
- North Turramurra
- North Wahroonga
- Pymble
- Roseville (Shared with Willoughby)
- Roseville Chase
- South Turramurra
- St Ives
- St Ives Chase
- Turramurra
- Wahroonga (Shared with Hornsby)
- Warrawee
- West Pymble

== Demographics ==
At the 2021 census, there were 124,076 people in the Ku-ring-gai Council local government area, of these 48.2 per cent were male and 51.8 per cent were female. Aboriginal and Torres Strait Islander people made up 0.2 per cent of the population, significantly below the national average of 3.2 per cent. The median age of people in the Ku-ring-gai Council area was 42 years; slightly above the national average of 38 years. Children aged 0 – 14 years made up 19.5 per cent of the population and people aged 65 years and over made up 19.3 per cent of the population. Of people in the area aged 15 years and over, 60.7 per cent were married and 7.2 per cent were either divorced or separated; a rate that is more than half the national average.

Population growth in the Ku-ring-gai Council area between the 2001 census and the 2006 census was 0.93 per cent and in the subsequent five years to the 2011 census, population growth was 8.13 per cent. At the 2021 census, the population in the Ku-ring-gai Council area increased by 5.1 per cent. When compared with total population growth of Australia for the same period, being 8.6 per cent, population growth in the Ku-ring-gai local government area is slower than the national average. The median weekly income for residents within the Ku-ring-gai Council area was significantly higher than the national average.

At the 2021 census, the area was linguistically diverse, with Asian languages spoken in more than 20 per cent of households; more than four times the national average.

Selected historical census data for Ku-ring-gai Council local government area
Census year		2001	2006	2011	2016	2021
Population	Estimated residents on census night	100,152	101,083	109,297	118,053	124,076
Population	LGA rank in terms of size within New South Wales			21st	▼22nd	▼23rd
Population	% of New South Wales population			1.58%	1.58%	1.58%
Population	% of Australian population	0.53%	▼0.51%	0.51%	▼0.50%	0.50%
Cultural and language diversity
Ancestry, top responses	English			34.2%	▼32.5%	▼29.6%
Ancestry, top responses	Australian			28.8%	▼25.0%	▼23.0%
Ancestry, top responses	Chinese			11.9%	▲17.7%	▲23.5%
Ancestry, top responses	Irish			10.3%	▼10.3%	▼8.7%
Ancestry, top responses	Scottish			9.6%	▼9.3%	▼8.6%
Language, top responses (other than English)	Cantonese	4.8%	▼4.7%	▲4.9%	▲5.0%	▲5.5%
Language, top responses (other than English)	Mandarin	1.7%	▲2.3%	▲3.8%	▲8.7%	▲13.1%
Language, top responses (other than English)	Korean	1.3%	▲1.5%	▲2.1%	▲2.5%	2.5%
Language, top responses (other than English)	Persian (excluding Dari)	n/c	n/c	▲0.7%	▲1.0%	▲1.3%
Language, top responses (other than English)	Japanese	0.9%	▼0.7%	0.7%	▲0.8%	0.8%
Language, top responses (other than English)	Hindi				0.7%	▲0.9%
Religious affiliation
Religious affiliation, top responses	No religion, so described	13.7%	▲16.3%	▲21.8%	▲31.0%	▲40.8%
Religious affiliation, top responses	Catholic	20.9%	▲21.7%	▼21.1%	▼18.9%	▼16.6%
Religious affiliation, top responses	Anglican	28.9%	▼27.1%	▼23.9%	▼18.8%	▼15.2%
Religious affiliation, top responses	Not stated	n/c	n/c	n/c	▲7.7%	▼4.1%
Religious affiliation, top responses	Uniting Church	8.7%	▼7.7%	▼6.3%	▼4.7%	▼3.7%
Median weekly incomes
Personal income	Median weekly personal income		A$716	A$814	A$942	A$1,117
Personal income	% of Australian median income		153.6%	141.1%	142.3%	138.8%
Family income	Median weekly family income		A$2,147	A$2,679	A$3,046	A$3,447
Family income	% of Australian median income		209.1%	180.9%	175.7%	162.6%
Household income	Median weekly household income		A$2,530	A$2,508	A$2,640	A$3,038
Household income	% of Australian median income		216.1%	203.2%	183.6%	174.0%

== Council ==
Map of Ku-ring-gai Council with suburb boundaries, as of 2009.

=== Current composition and election method ===
A map of the five wards as of the 2021 local elections.

Ku-ring-gai Council is composed of ten councillors elected proportionally as five separate wards, each electing two councillors. All councillors are elected for a fixed four-year term of office. The mayor is elected bi-annually by the councillors at the first meeting of the council, while the deputy mayor is elected annually. The most recent election was held on 14 September 2024, and the makeup of the council is as follows:

Ward	Councillor	Party	Notes
Comenarra Ward	Jeff Pettett	Independent	Elected 2012 (as Liberal Democrat), Independent from 2017; Deputy Mayor 2018–2019; Mayor 2022–2023.
Comenarra Ward	Matt Devlin	Independent	Deputy Mayor 2026-present.
Gordon Ward	Barbara Ward	Independent Liberal	Deputy Mayor 2022–2023.
Gordon Ward	Indu Balachandran	Independent politician	
Roseville Ward	Sam Ngai	Independent Liberal	Elected 2017; Deputy Mayor 2021–2022; Mayor 2023–2024.
Roseville Ward	Alec Taylor	Independent politician	
St Ives Ward	Martin Smith	Independent politician	Elected 2017. Deputy Mayor 2025-2026.
St Ives Ward	Christine Kay	Independent Liberal	Elected 2017; Deputy Mayor 2023–2024; 2024–2026.
Wahroonga Ward	Cedric Spencer	Independent	Elected 2017; Deputy Mayor 2020–2021; Mayor 2021–2022. Independent Liberal 2017-2026, Independent 2026-present
Wahroonga Ward	Kim Wheatley	Independent politician	Deputy Mayor 2024–2025. Mayor 2026-present.

== Election results ==
=== 2024 ===
2024 New South Wales local elections: Ku-ring-gai
Party	Votes	%	Swing	Seats	Change
Independent	33,525	49.1	−7.7	6	Steady
Independent Liberal	21,188	31.1	+13.7	3	▲1
Your Voice On Local Issues	8,543	12.5	+2.5	1	Steady
Preserve Ku-ring-gai	2,161	3.2	−0.6	0	▼1
Greens	1,753	2.6		0	Steady
Labor	1,061	1.6		0	Steady
Formal votes	68,231	94.2			
Informal votes	4,221	5.8			
Total	72,452				

=== 2021 ===
2021 New South Wales local elections: Ku-ring-gai
Party	Votes	%	Swing	Seats	Change
Independent	39,069	56.8		6	
Your Voice on Local Issues	6,863	10.0		1	
Independent Liberal/Independent joint ticket	6,053	8.8		0	
Independent Liberal	5,908	8.6		2	
Preserve Ku-ring-gai	2,600	3.8		1	
Greg Cook & Tori Huxtable	2,455	3.6		0	
Liberal Democrats	1,840	3.6		0	
Roshan Wickremanayake Group	1,729	2.5		0	
Comenarra Independents	1,170	1.7		0	
Campaign for Comenarra	1,075	1.6		0	
Formal votes	68,762	94.94			
Informal votes	3,665	5.06			
Turnout	72,427				

== Council history ==
Ku-ring-gai was first incorporated on 6 March 1906 as the "Shire of Ku-ring-gai" and the first Shire Council was elected on 24 November 1906. The first leader of the council was elected at the first meeting on 8 December 1906, when Councillor William Cowan was elected as Shire President. There would not be a Deputy President until the council election on 1 March 1920.

On 22 September 1928, the Shire of Ku-ring-gai was proclaimed as the "Municipality of Ku-ring-gai" and the titles of 'Shire President' and 'Councillor' were retitled to be 'Mayor' and 'Alderman' respectively. In 1993, with the passing of a new Local Government Act, council was retitled as simply "Ku-ring-gai Council" and aldermen were retitled as councillors.

A 2015 review of local government boundaries by the NSW Government Independent Pricing and Regulatory Tribunal recommended that Ku-ring-gai Council and parts of the Hornsby Shire north of the M2 merge to form a new council with an area of 540 square kilometres (210 sq mi) and support a population of approximately 270,000. The Ku-ring-gai Council took the NSW Government to court and, on appeal, the NSW Court of Appeal found that the council had been denied procedural fairness. The proposed merger was stood aside indefinitely. In July 2017, the Berejiklian government decided to abandon the forced merger of the Hornsby and Ku-ring-gai local government areas, along with several other proposed forced mergers.

=== Planning and development ===
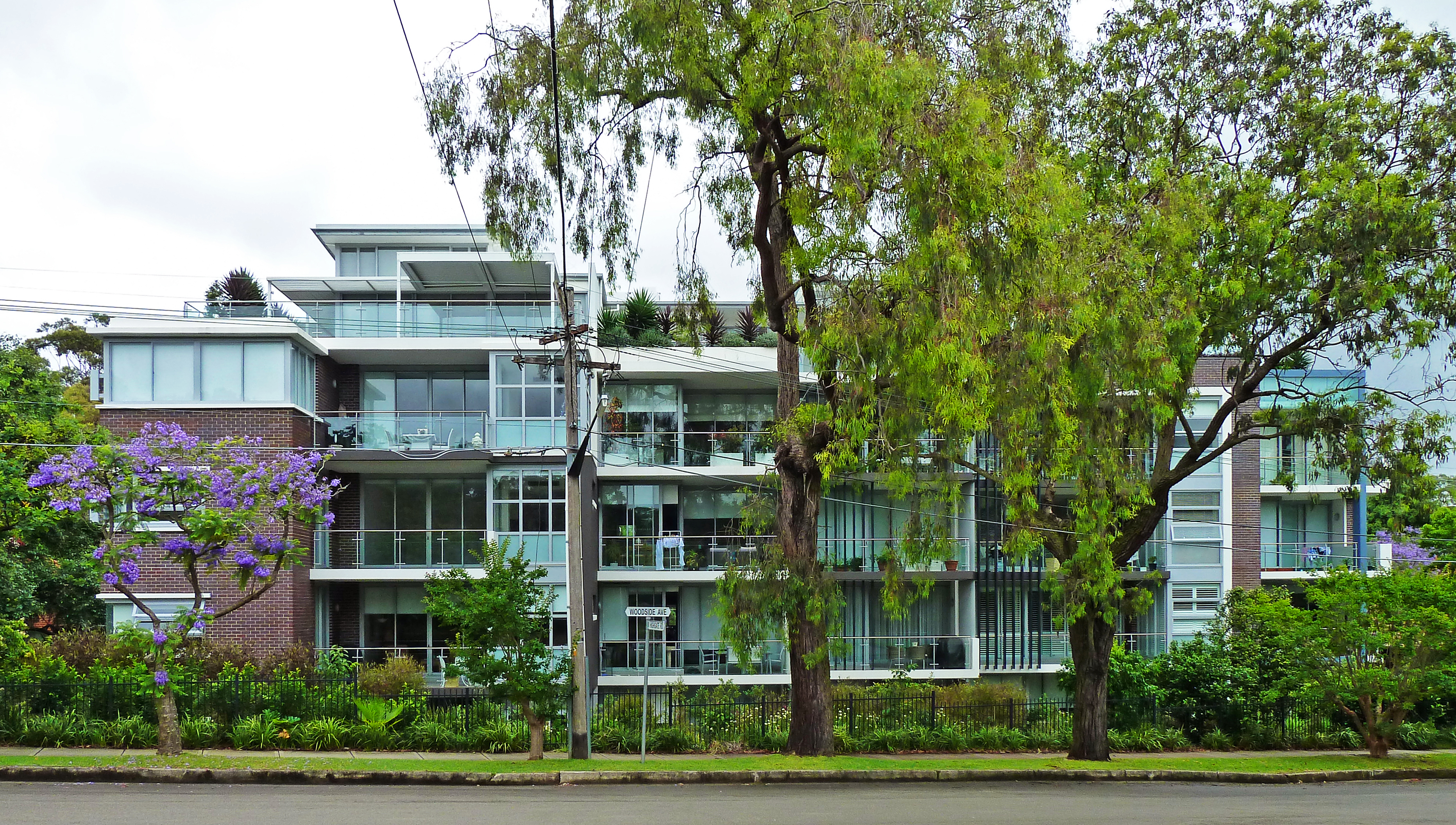
Apartments (circa 2008) in Lindfield

During the term of planning minister Frank Sartor, law reforms were passed that gave development approval to a panel and away from local government. These new laws were controversially implemented in Ku-ring-gai, with immense opposition from the local population who claim that their suburbs, with nationally recognised heritage values in both housing and original native forest, are being trashed by slab-sided apartment developments with no effective protection provided by either the Ku-ring-gai Council or the state government. This has been termed "The Rape of Ku-ring-gai".

The laws are intended to take development approval power away from local councils and to the Department of Planning, via the development panels. Planning panels were introduced across New South Wales under recently passed planning reforms. In 2005–06, Ku-ring-gai had the second highest reported total development value in the state – A$1.7 billion, more than Parramatta, second only to the City of Sydney.

== Shire Clerks, Town Clerks and General Managers ==
Name	Term	Notes
Edward Astley	21 June 1906 – 31 August 1911	
James A. Gilroy	1 September 1911 – March 1925	
Arthur Havelock Hirst	March 1925 – 18 November 1947	
Norman L. Griffiths	18 November 1947 – 22 September 1969	
Frederick E. Newton	22 September 1969 – 5 October 1970	
Graham Joss	5 October 1970 – 16 August 1971	
Lyndhurst Evelyn Whalan	16 August 1971 – 12 November 1973	
Warren Taylor	12 November 1973 – 1993	
Joseph Robert Diffen	1993–1997	
Rhonda Bignell	1997–2002	
Brian Bell	2002 – February 2006	
John McKee	March 2006 – 15 August 2023	
David Marshall	3 May 2024 – present	

== Heritage listings ==
Ku-ring-gai Council has a number of heritage-listed sites, including:

- Gordon, 17 McIntosh Street: Eryldene, Gordon
- Gordon, Middlemiss Street: Gordon railway station, Sydney
- Gordon, 691 Pacific Highway: Iolanthe, Gordon
- Gordon, 707 Pacific Highway: Tulkiyan
- Gordon, 799 Pacific Highway: Gordon Public School (former)
- Killara, 13 Kalang Avenue: Harry and Penelope Seidler House
- Killara, 1 Werona Avenue: Woodlands, Killara
- Lindfield, 33 Tryon Road: Tryon Road Uniting Church
- Pymble, Pacific Highway: Pymble Reservoirs No. 1 and No. 2
- Pymble, 982-984 Pacific Highway: Pymble Substation
- Pymble, 29 Telegraph Road: Eric Pratten House
- Turramurra, 17 Boomerang Street: Ingleholme
- Turramurra, 43 Ku-Ring-Gai Avenue: Cossington (Turramurra)
- Wahroonga, 62 Boundary Road: Jack House, Wahroonga
- Wahroonga, 69-71 Clissold Road: Rose Seidler House
- Wahroonga, 61-65 Coonanbarra Road: St John's Uniting Church, Wahroonga
- Wahroonga, 16 Fox Valley Road: Purulia, Wahroonga
- Wahroonga, 69 Junction Road: Evatt House
- Wahroonga, North Shore railway: Wahroonga railway station
- Wahroonga, 1526 Pacific Highway: Mahratta, Wahroonga
- Wahroonga, 1678 Pacific Highway and Woonona Avenue: Wahroonga Reservoir
- Wahroonga, 23 Roland Avenue: Simpson-Lee House I
- Wahroonga, 14 Woonona Avenue: The Briars, Wahroonga

== Sports in area ==
Cricket and Rugby union are the most popular sports in the area, and the Ku-ring-gai Council LGA is represented by the Gordon District Cricket Club, and the Gordon Rugby Football Club, who both play primarily at Chatswood Oval, in the nearby City of Willoughby.

In Rugby League Ku-ring-gai council falls within the district of the North Sydney Bears (The only NRL club without representation to have a junior rugby league district, although there have been ongoing efforts to resurrect the club to the top flight), the team is officially known as the North Sydney District Rugby League Football Club, and clubs compete in a joint district competition with clubs within the districts of the Manly Warringah Sea Eagles, and teams in the competition either play with a Bears or Sea Eagles logo on their jersey, in order to signal whether they belong in the district of the Bears or Sea Eagles, and the Ku-ring-gai LGA is represented by the Ku-ring-gai Cubs, who primarily play their home games at Memorial Park in Turramurra

== See also ==
- Local government areas of New South Wales
- WildThings, a 2004 urban fauna translocation program
