= Pymble =

- Suburb
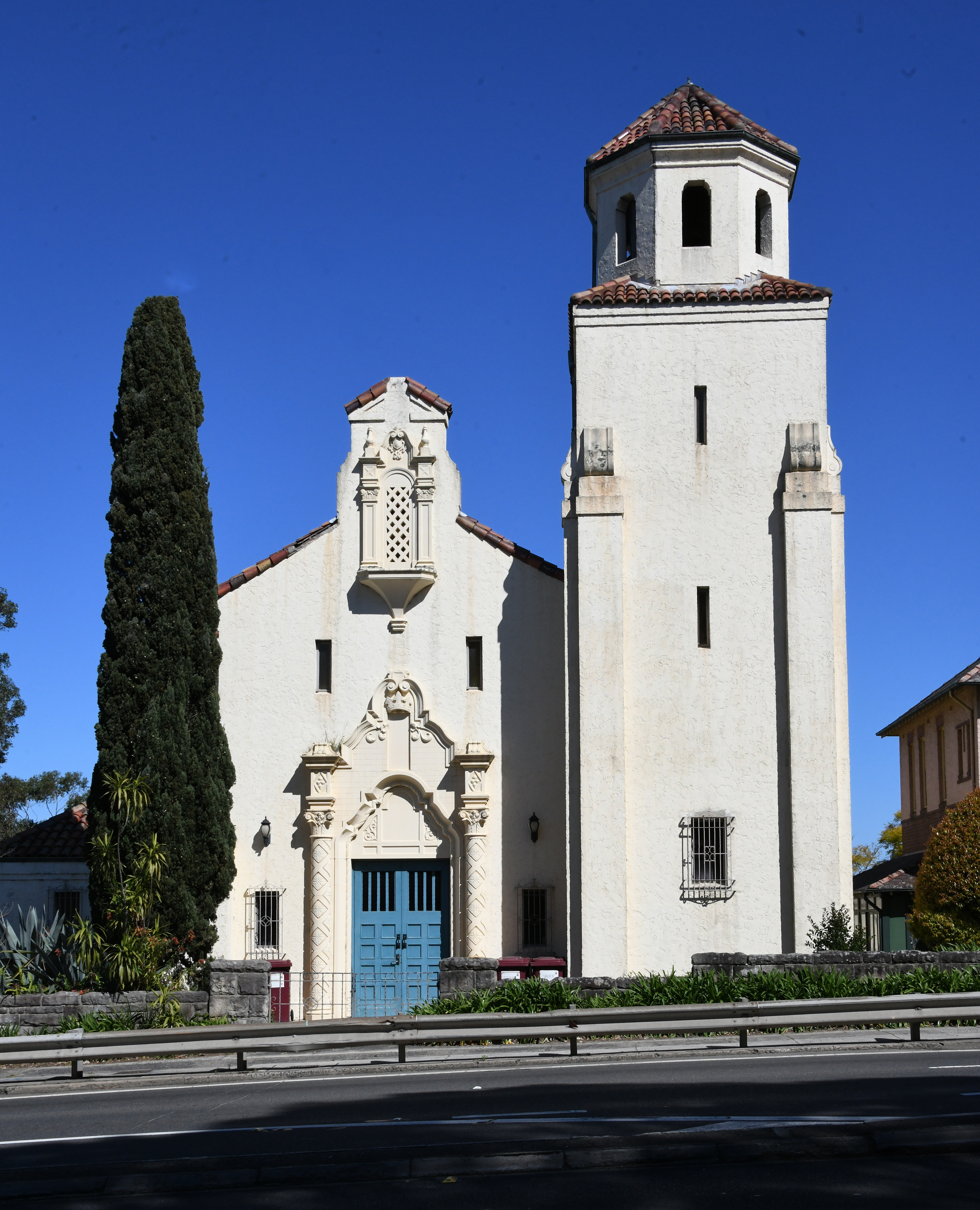
- Ku-ring-gai Town Hall, formerly the Sacred Heart Catholic Church.

- Interactive map of Pymble
- Country: Australia
- State: New South Wales
- City: Sydney
- LGA: Ku-ring-gai Council
- Location: 15 km (9.3 mi) north-west of Sydney CBD
- Established: 1823

Government
  - State electorate: Davidson Wahroonga
  - Federal division: Bradfield

Area
  - Total: 6.51 km^{2} (2.51 sq mi)
- Elevation: 139 m (456 ft)

Population
  - Total: 11,775 (2021 census)
  - Density: 1,808.8/km^{2} (4,685/sq mi)
- Postcode: 2073
Suburbs around Pymble
Turramurra	Turramurra	St Ives
South Turramurra	Pymble	Gordon
West Pymble	West Pymble	Gordon

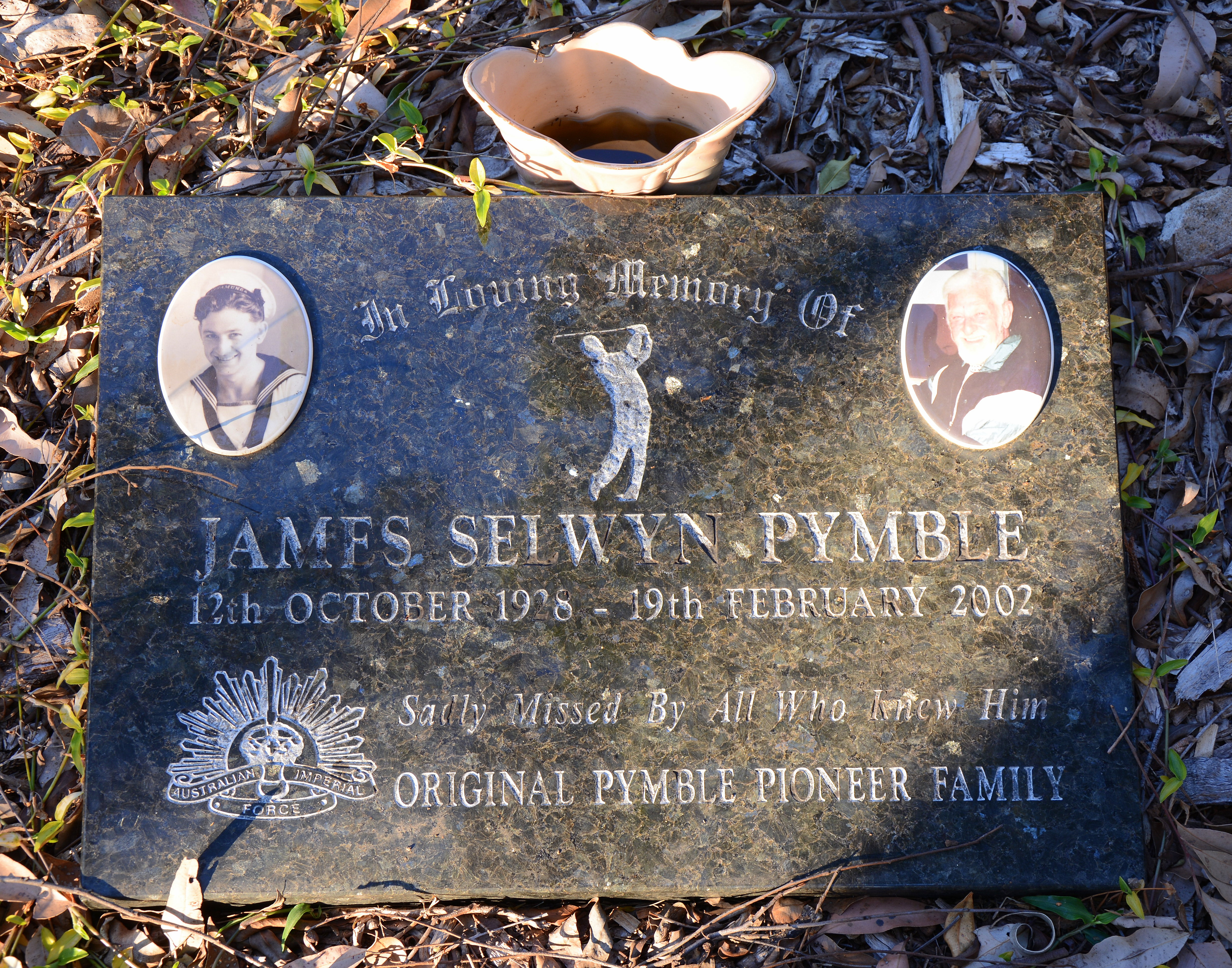
Grave of James Selwyn Pymble (St John the Baptist Church, Gordon), a member of the pioneering Pymble family.

Pymble is a suburb on the Upper North Shore of Sydney in the state of New South Wales, Australia. Pymble is 15 kilometres (9 mi) north of the Sydney central business district in the local government area of Ku-ring-gai Council.

West Pymble is a separate suburb to the south west of Pymble, adjacent to the Lane Cove National Park.

Pymble is notable for its gardens, bush reserves and heritage-listed residences and properties of architectural significance, such as the Eric Pratten House.

== History ==
Based on settlers' accounts, the land that came to be known as Pymble was traversed by, and at least periodically inhabited by, the Cammeraigal clan or tribe of the Kuringai (also known as Guringai) Aboriginal people. The Cammeraigal had occupied the land between the Lane Cove River, Hawkesbury and east to the coast. They would travel from grounds at Cowan Creek to the Parramatta River via Pymble - passing west through the land where Pymble Ladies' College now stands, through the Lane Cove Valley and North Ryde. En route they would reportedly hold corroborees at the current site of the Pymble Reservoir on Telegraph Rd and "camped on the hill...at the junction of Merrivale Rd and Selwyn St."

The region was important to the early Sydney colony as a major supplier of timber for a wide variety of uses. The main timber varieties were blackbutt, stringybark, iron bark and blue gum. In later years it was also an important supplier of agricultural produce. It became widely known for the high quality of its produce and especially for its oranges which had been introduced to the area by Robert Pymble sometime around 1828 and which by later years were grown extensively throughout the region by numerous different growers following land sub-divisions.

Eventually agriculture and small farming gave way to residential development with residential sub-divisions commencing around 1879. The first bank - the Australian Joint Stock Bank - was established in 1888 in a then prominent house known as Grandview built on Pymble Hill ca 1883 by the son of local hotelier Richard Porter. Porter had opened the Gardener's Arms Hotel, also on Pymble Hill, in 1866. From this time the centre of commercial activity came to be at the top of the hill around the Pacific Highway and Bannockburn Road area, but with the railway station being located by necessity at the bottom of the hill development began to shift towards the new railway station at the foot of the hill. Pymble Post Office opened there on 6 August 1890.

== Heritage listings ==
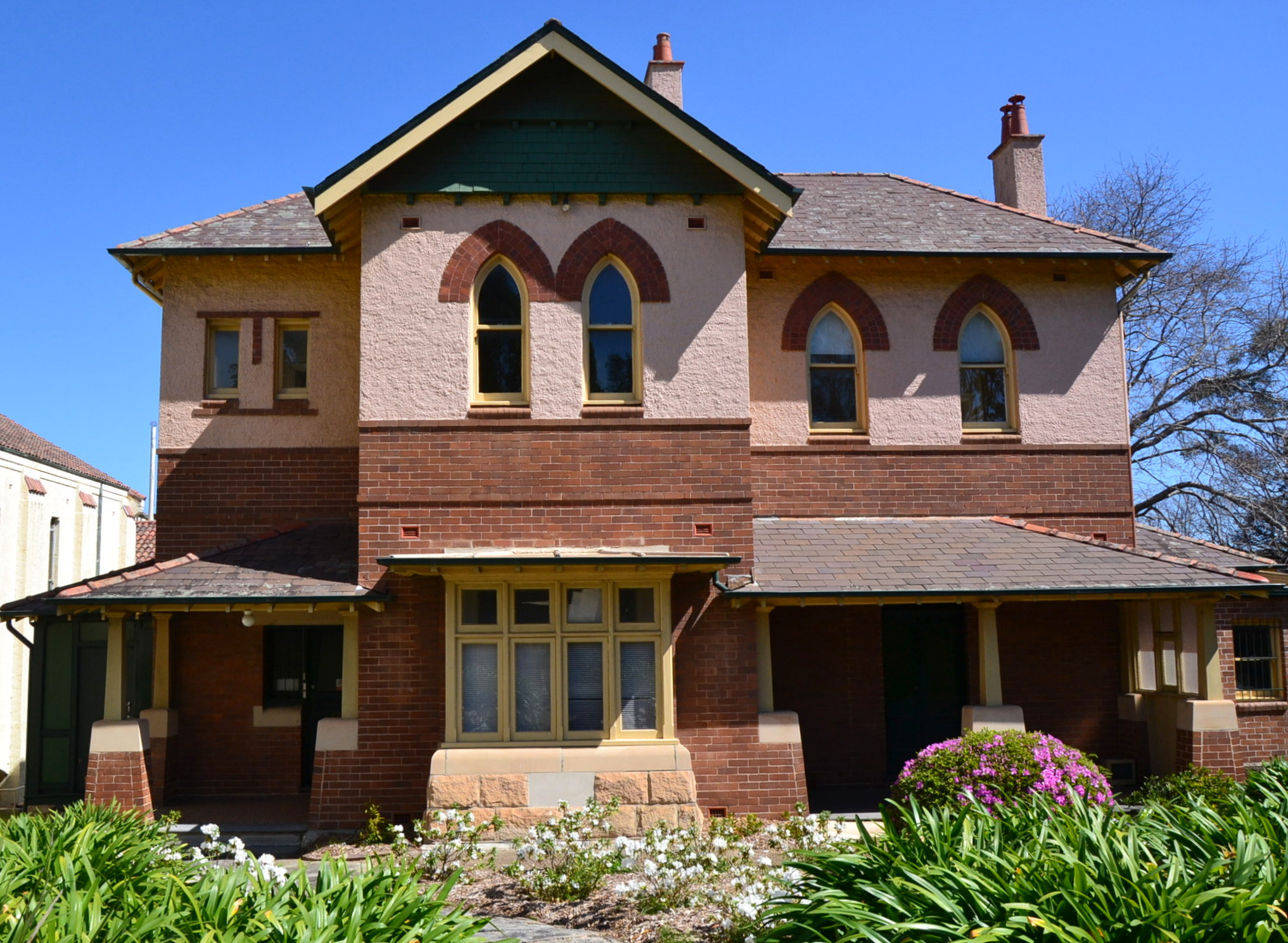
Heritage-listed Sacred Heart Presbytery.

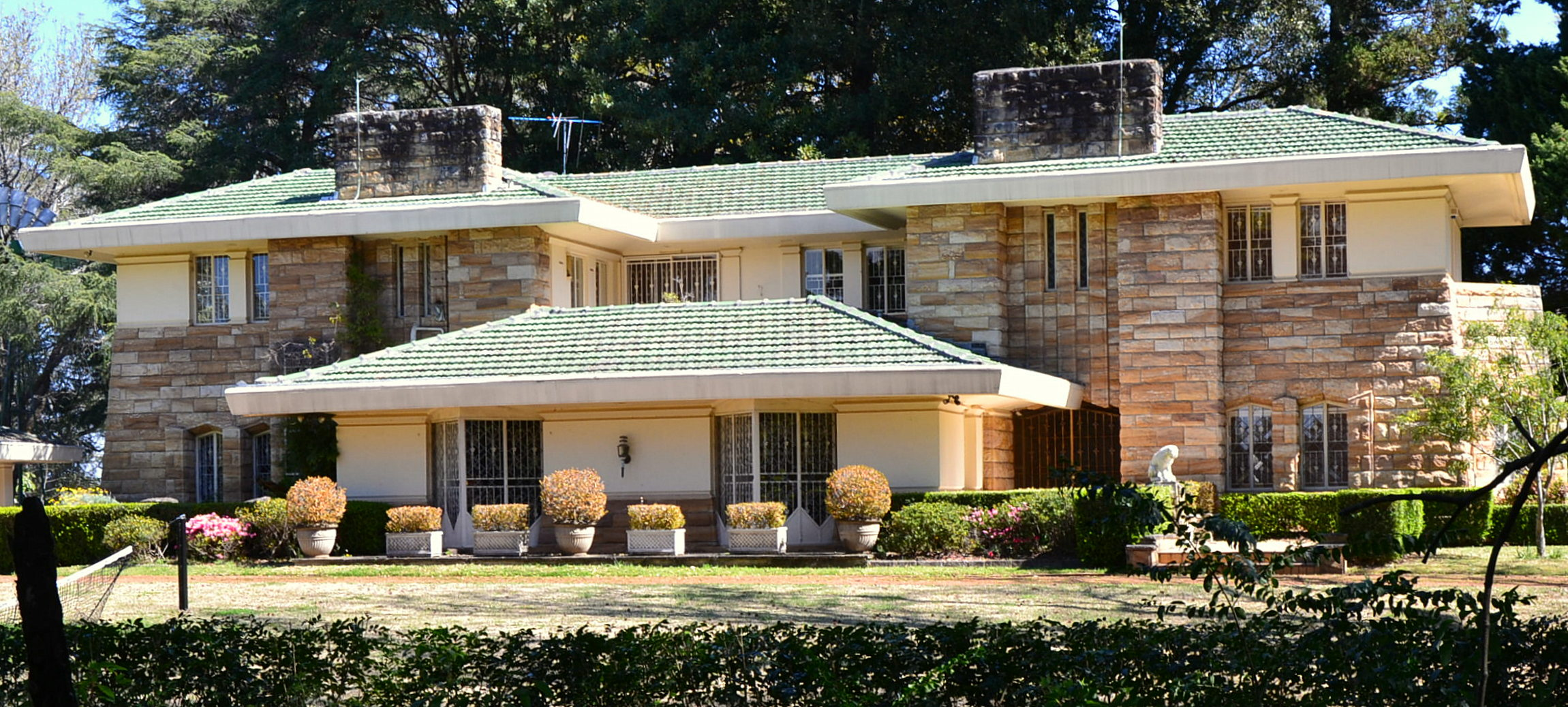
Walter Burley Griffin designed-home, Coppins, also called the Eric Pratten House.

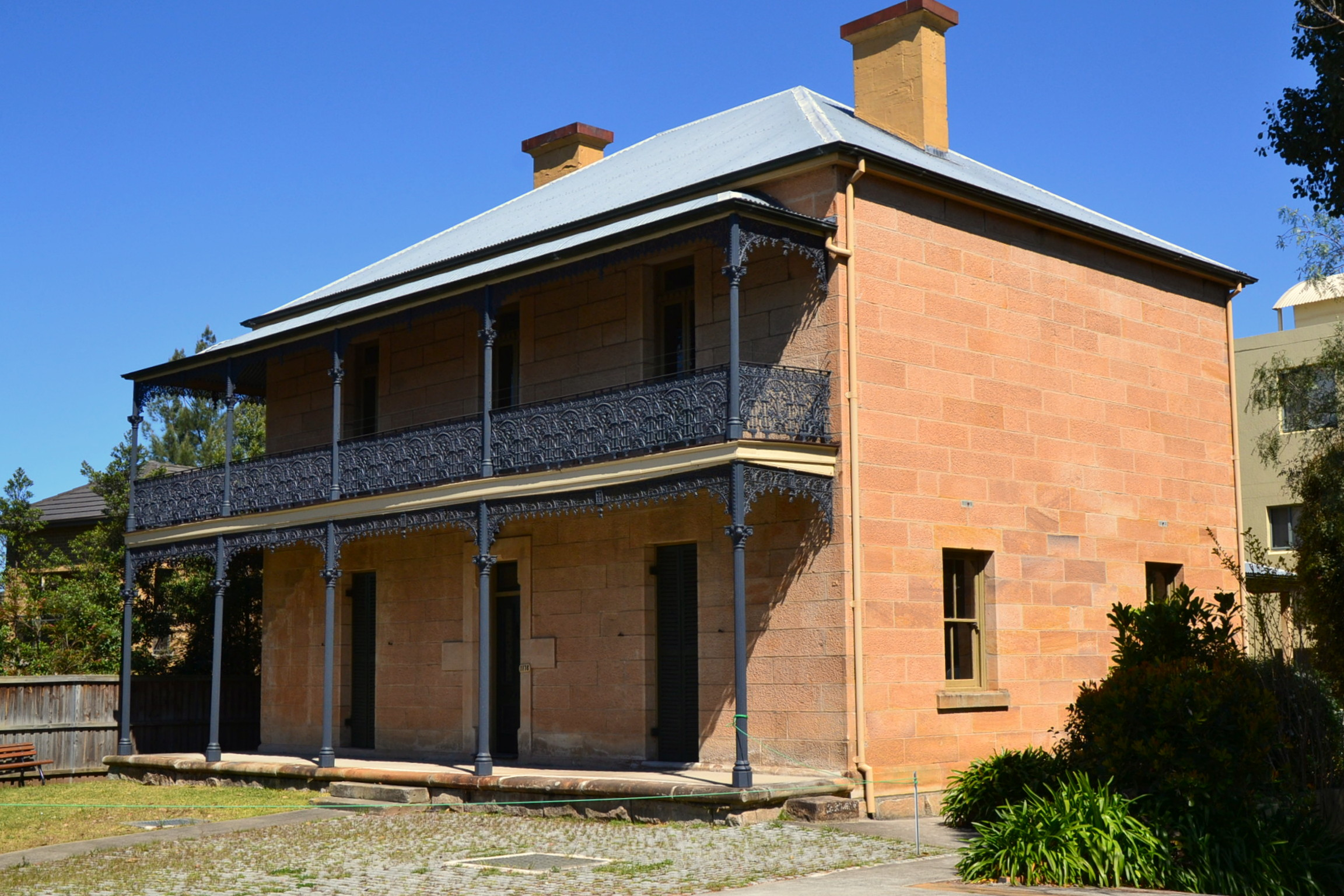
Heritage-listed home Grandview.

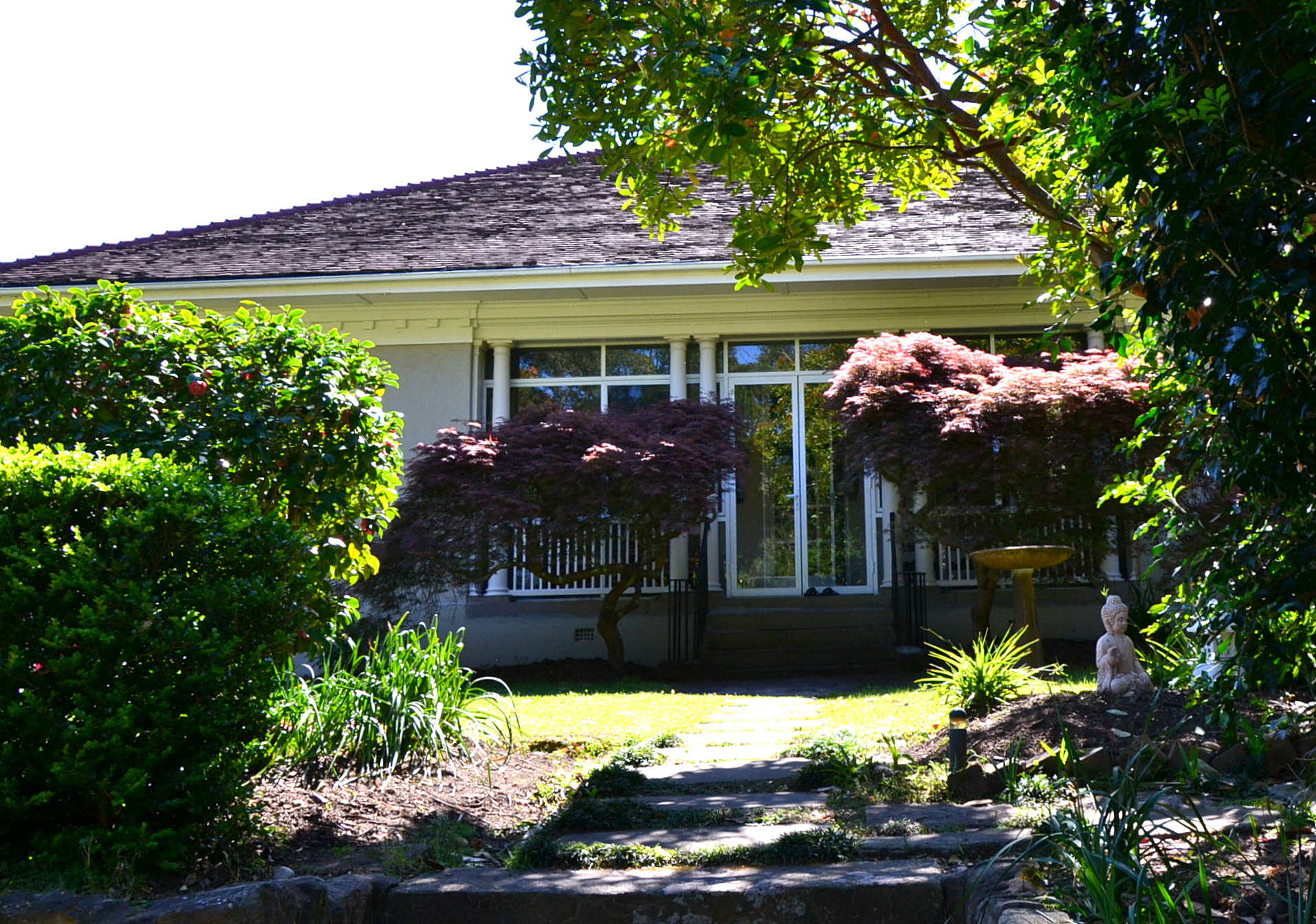
Macquarie Cottage.

Pymble has a number of heritage-listed sites, including:

- Pacific Highway: Pymble Reservoirs No. 1 and No. 2
- 982–984 Pacific Highway: Pymble Substation
- 29 Telegraph Road: Eric Pratten House

== Buildings ==
Significant buildings include:

- Ku-ring-gai Town Hall is situated at the top of Pymble Hill on the Pacific Highway. It was formerly the Sacred Heart Catholic Church, which was built in 1934, and is an example of the Inter-War Spanish Mission architectural style. Along with the presbytery next door it is heritage-listed.
- Pymble Chapel (formerly Pymble Methodist Church), on the corner of Mona Vale Road and Bromley Avenue, was built in 1879. It was the second church built in Pymble and is the oldest remaining building in the suburb.
- St Swithun's Anglican Church, on Telegraph Road, was built c. 1938 and is an example of the Inter-War Gothic style. It is the only church in Australia named after St Swithun.

Significant houses include:

- Grandview is a two-storey, Georgian structure made of sandstone. It was built c. 1870 as a bank but is now used as a home. It has a federal heritage listing.
- Merrivale is a local stately home in the Regency style and is considered one of the finest examples of its kind in Ku-ring-gai. It has a state heritage listing.
- Coppins, sometimes known as the Eric Pratten House, was designed by Walter Burley Griffin and built c. 1936. It is one of three large houses designed by Griffin in Ku-ring-gai and is significant because most of his residential buildings were single-storey. It is an example of the Art Deco/Prairie style and has a state heritage listing.
- Macquarie Cottage, in Avon Road, was designed by William Hardy Wilson and built in 1918. It is considered a typical example of Wilson's work and has both state and federal heritage listings.
- Sacred Heart Presbytery is a two-storey house in the Federation Arts and Crafts style, with Gothic touches to the windows. It was built in 1907 and has a state heritage listing.
- Colinroobie, a two-storey Federation mansion built in the early 20th century, situated at the corner of the Pacific Highway and Clydesdale Place. It has a state heritage listing.

=== Gallery ===
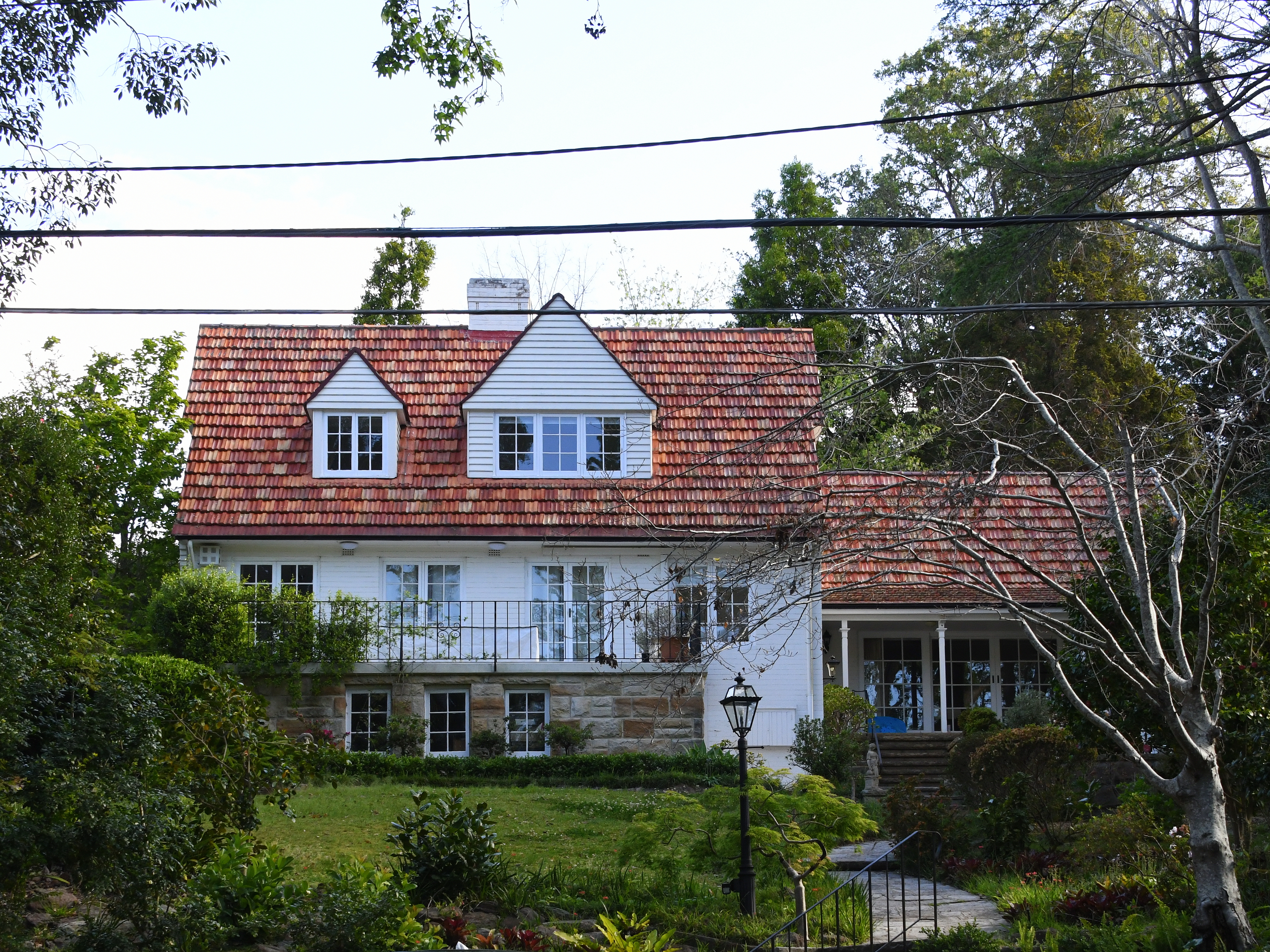

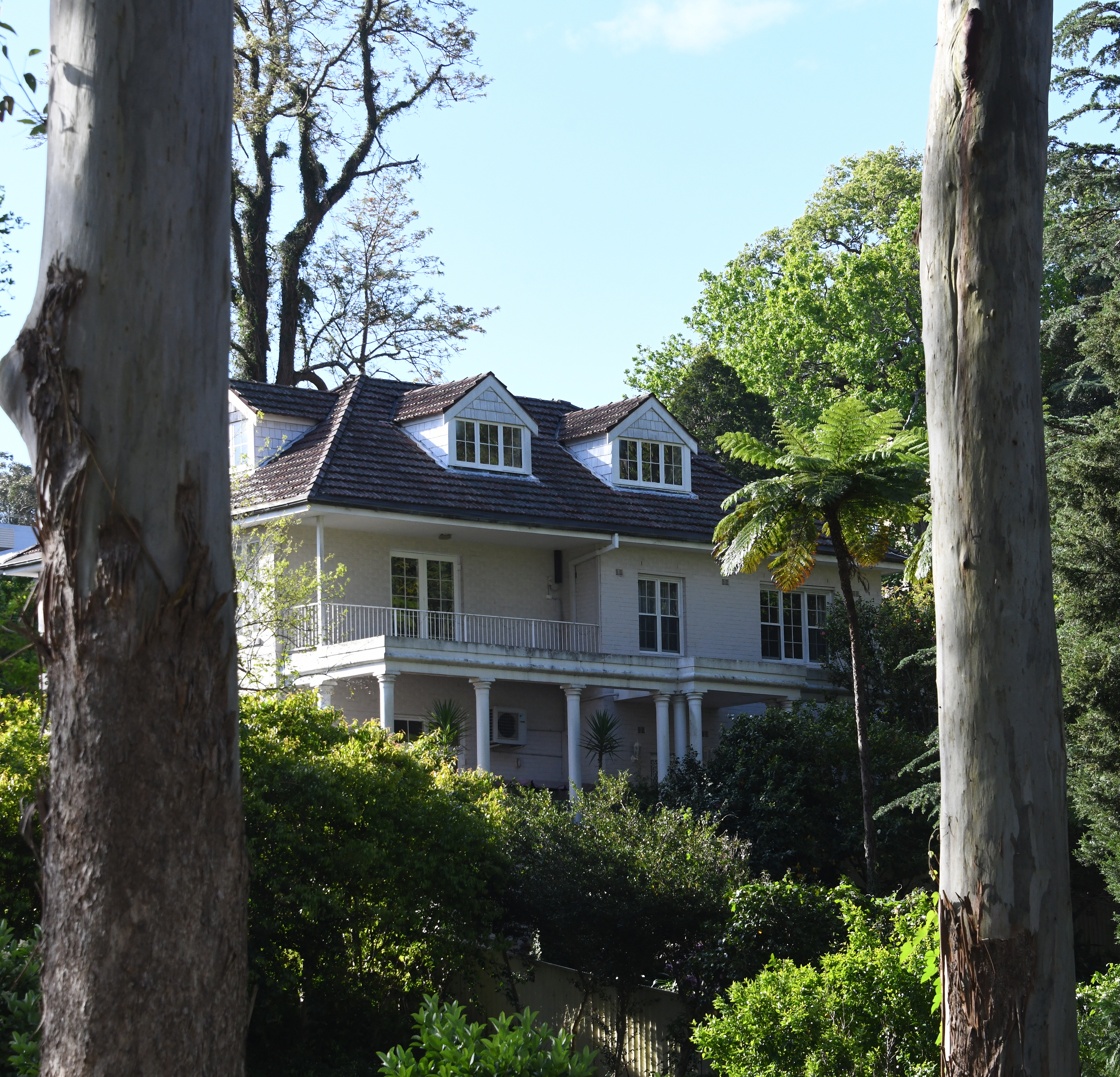

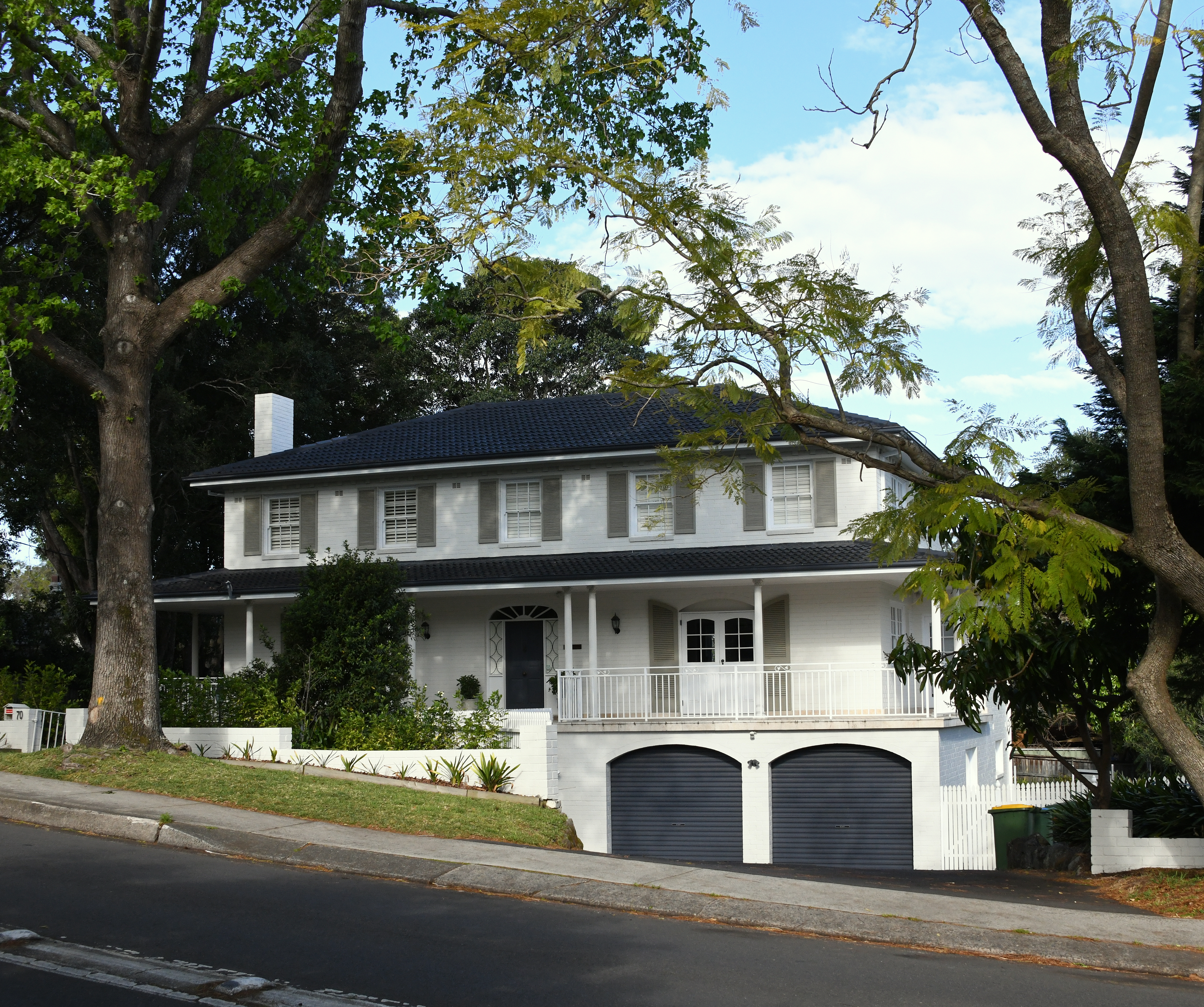

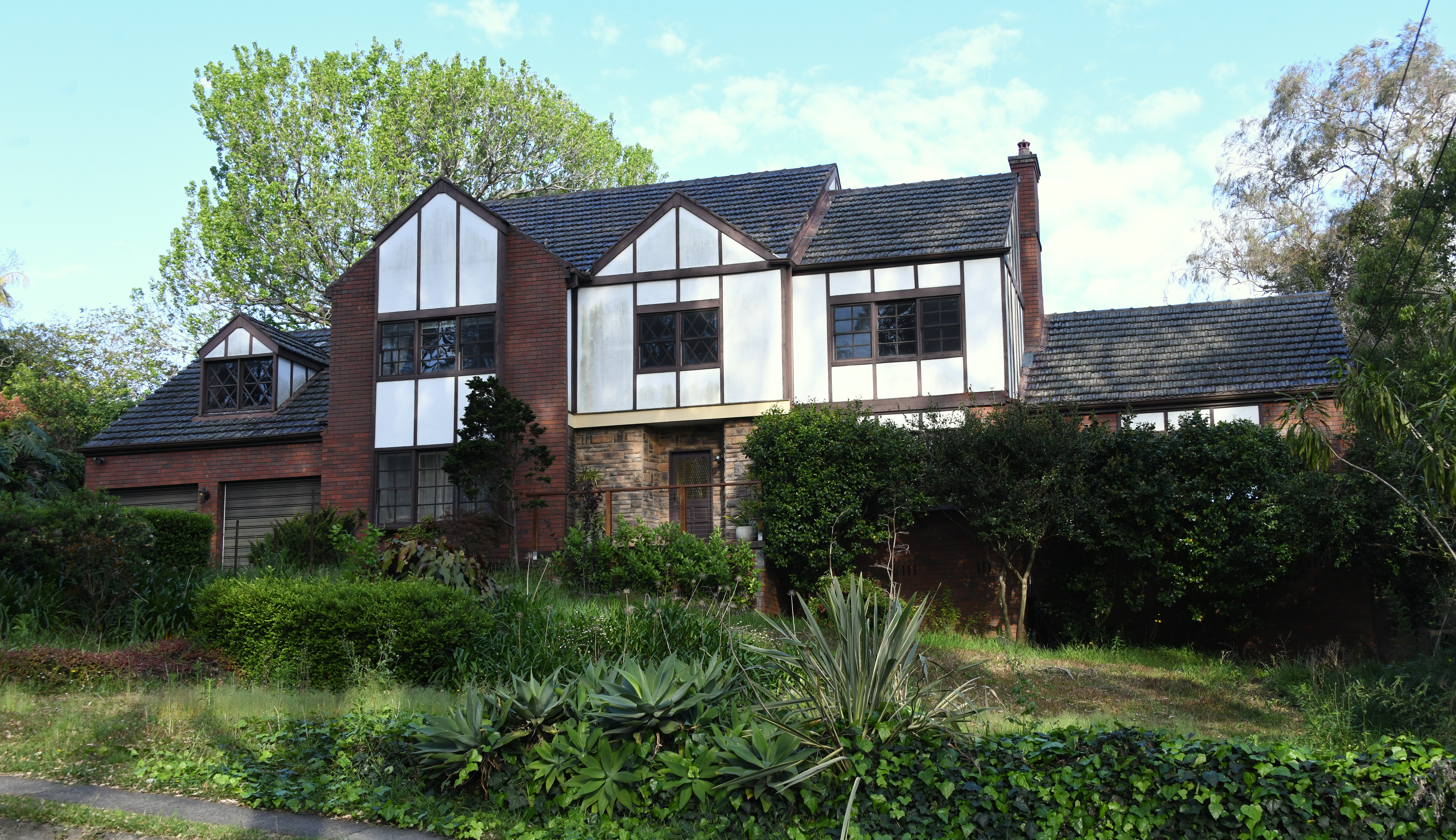

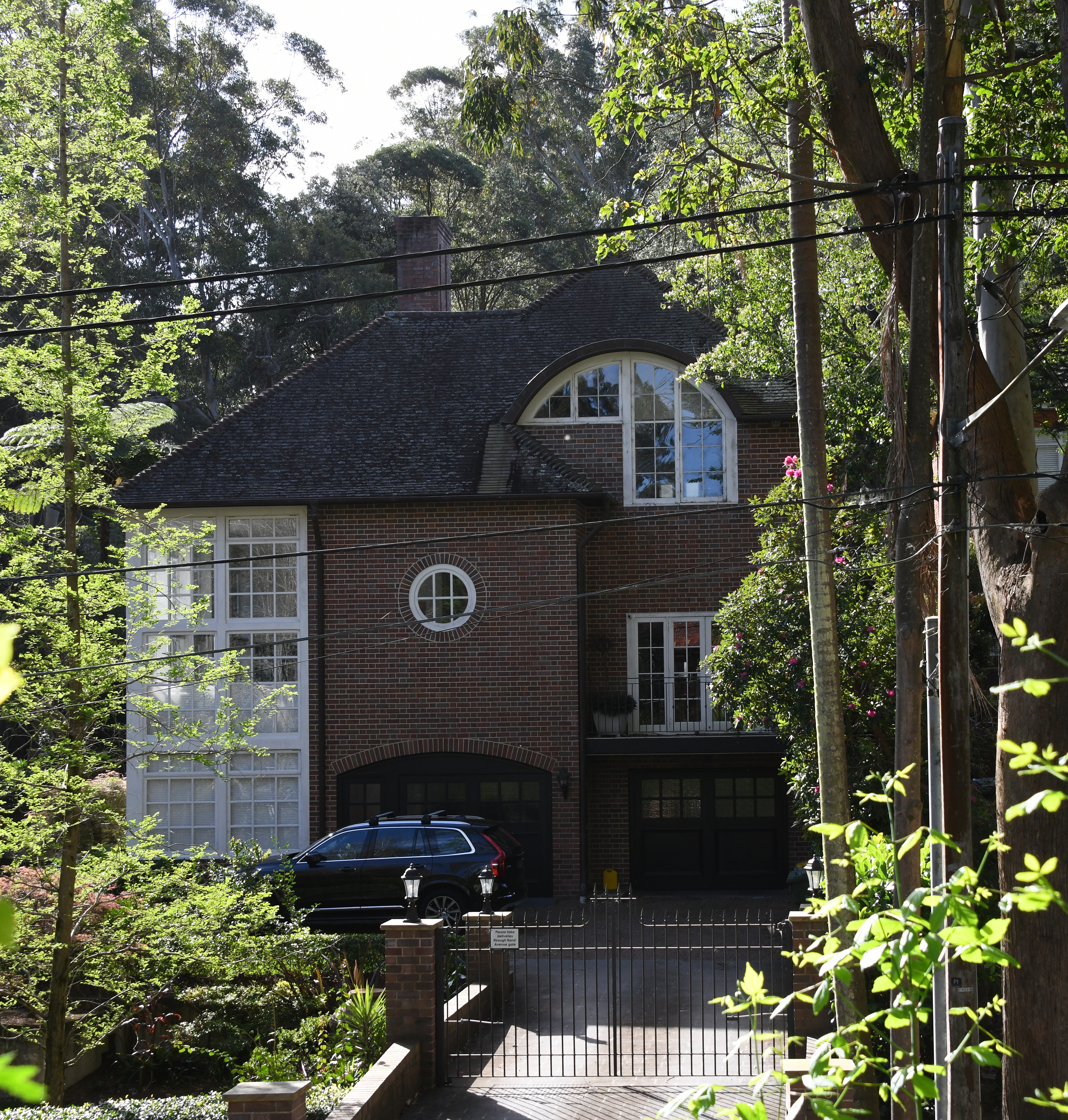

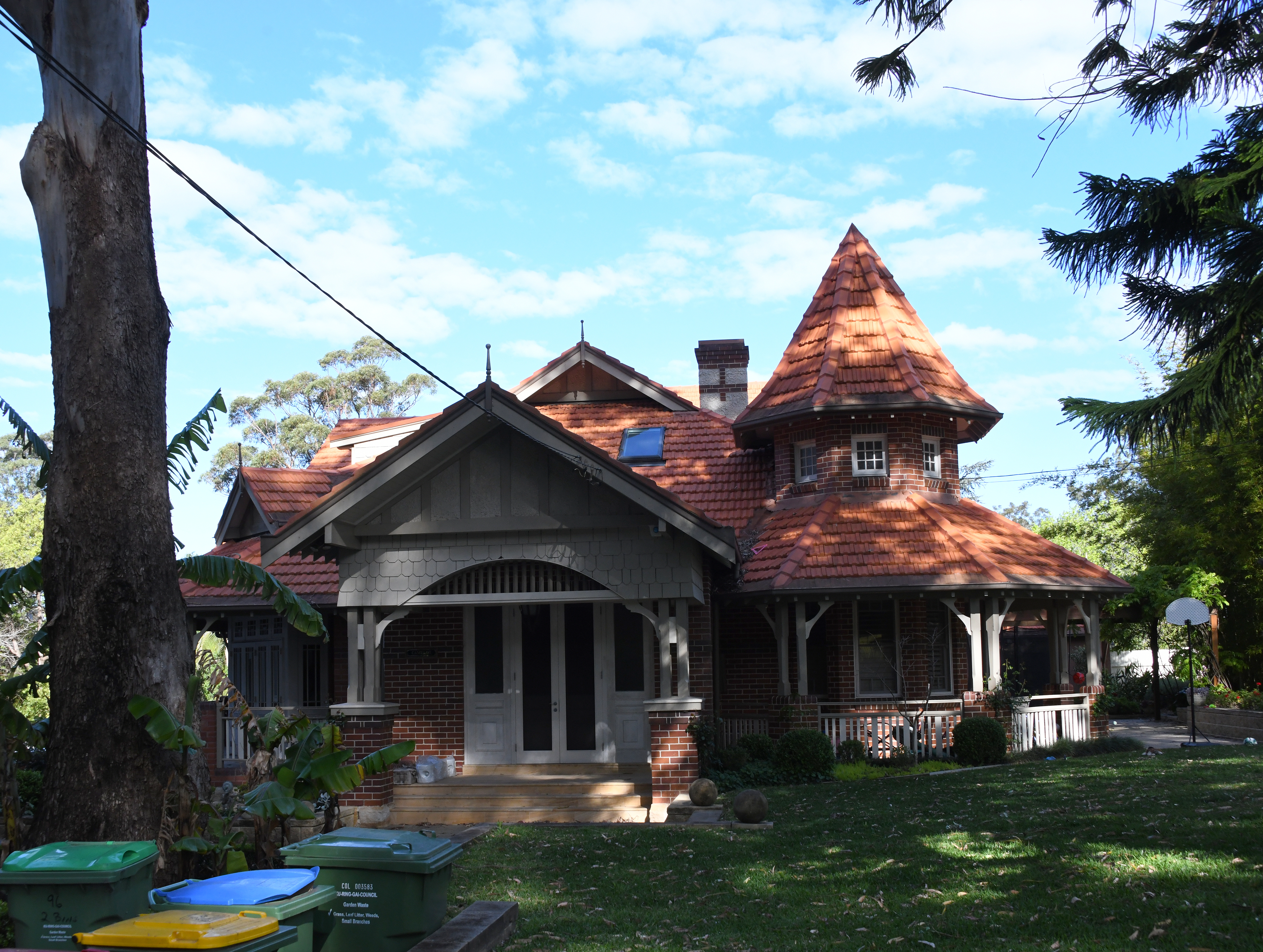

== Transport ==
Pymble railway station is on the North Shore railway line.

Pymble is bisected by the Pacific Highway, and the intersection of Mona Vale Road and Ryde Road is the southern boundary of the Suburb.

CDC NSW buses operate route 579 from Pymble station (departing Grandview Street) to East Turramurra (peak hours only) and route 560 from Gordon station to West Pymble (half-hourly service).

Route 575 also operates along the Pacific Highway past the railway station (half-hourly service). It goes to West Pymble and Macquarie University southbound and to Turramurra station and Hornsby station northbound.

There is a taxi stand on the eastern side of the station in Grandview Street.

At the 2021 census, 3.4% of employed people travelled to work on public transport and 28.1% by car (either as driver or as passenger) – a typical reflection of the Sydney area mode of transport.

== Commercial areas ==
- Pymble Shopping Village - Grandview Street, adjacent to Pymble railway station
- Pacific Highway near Pymble station
- Bridge Street and West Street

== Schools ==
- Pymble Ladies' College (K–12)
- Pymble Public School, a government primary school, located on Crown Road whose alumni includes actors Hugh Jackman and Chris Lilley
- Sacred Heart Catholic Primary School (K–6)
- Gordon West Public School (K–6) located in West Pymble (in a precinct formerly called West Gordon)
- Our Lady of Perpetual Succour (K-6)

== Parks and recreation ==
- Robert Pymble Park is located on the eastern side of the railway behind the shops in Grandview Parade. This park features many large trees, tennis courts, an enclosed playground and amenities.
- Bannockburn Oval, located in Bannockburn Rd, is a large sports field catering to athletics, cricket, soccer, rugby and other sporting activities.
- The Pymble Soldiers Memorial, located on Mona Vale Rd, is a memorial park dedicated to lives lost in all wars featuring rose beds, formal terraces and a hilltop view.
- Dalrymple-Hay Nature Reserve on Mona Vale Road is one of the last remaining blue gum high forests in Sydney. Visitors can "escape from the busy rush of Sydney life with a walk among the majestic tall blue gums and blackbutts. Check out the large hollows in the tree trunks as they burst with colours of the beautiful native birds, such as king parrots, rosellas and lorikeets".
- There are also numerous untouched bush reserves which offer a taste of the original natural beauty of the region. Some include walking paths such as the Sheldon Forest track accessible via Warragal Road. "The track meanders through blue gum tall forest on the ridge tops, riparian forest along the creeks and open forest woodlands on the hill slopes. Sheldon Forest is of high conservation status because it contains some of the last remnants of the endangered ecological communities of Sydney Turpentine Ironbark Forest (STIF) and Blue Gum High Forest (BGHF)"
- West Pymble Scout Group offers Scouting activities to young people aged 8-18 and is based at West Pymble Bicentennial Park.
- Turramurra, Kissing Point, and Gordon Rover Scout Crews all draw membership from Pymble, and are active groups of young people aged 18-25, who undertake a wide range of outdoor, social and community service activities.

== Places ==
Walter Cresswell O'Reilly lookout, Pacific Highway, Pymble.

== Demographics ==
At the 2021 census, the suburb of Pymble recorded a population of 11,775. Of these:

- The median age was 41 years, compared to the national median of 38 years. Children aged under 15 years made up 19.7% of the population (the national average was 18.2%) and people aged 65 years and over made up 19.7% of the population (the national average was 17.2%).
- Somewhat over half (53.1%) were born in Australia; the next most common countries of birth were China 12.2%, England 4.5%, Hong Kong 3.3%, India 2.8% and South Africa 2.4%. A little under two-thirds (60.4%) of people spoke only English at home; other languages spoken at home included Mandarin 15.5%, Cantonese 5.8%, Korean 2.8%, Persian (excluding Dari) 1.4% and Hindi 1.3%.
- The median household weekly income was $3,379, which was much more than the national median of $1,746.
- Separate houses constituted 72.4% of all residences. Another 24.8% were flats, units or apartments, while 2.5% were semi-detached.
- In the 2021 Census, religious affiliation in Pymble was No Religion, 41.9%, Anglican 15.2%, Catholic 15.2%, Uniting Church 4.5% and Not stated 3.8%.

== Notable residents ==
Past

- Belinda Bauer, actress and psychologist
- Errol Flynn, actor
- Joan Hammond
- Hugh Jackman, actor
- David Leckie (1951-2021), former CEO of the Seven West Media (owner of the Seven Network). And former Managing Director of the Nine Network.
- Stirling Mortlock, rugby union player, former Australian Wallabies captain
- Walter Cresswell O'Reilly, WWI, mayor, film censorship board
- John Symond, businessman
- John Clive Ward, physicist

Present

- Liane Moriarty, author
- John Newcombe, tennis player
- Todd McKenny, dancer
