= George Caley =

English botanist and explorer in Australia (1770–1829)

- Born: 10 June 1770; Craven, Yorkshire, England
- Died: 23 May 1829 (aged 58); London, England
- Occupations: Botanist and explorer
- Known for: Caleana, Grevillea caleyi, Viola caleyana, Banksia caleyi, and Eucalyptus caleyi Discovery of Mount Banks, Australia
- Scientific career
- Institutions: Kew Gardens
- Patrons: Sir Joseph Banks
- Author abbrev. (botany): Caley

George Caley (10 June 1770 – 23 May 1829) was an English botanist and explorer, active in Australia for the majority of his career.

== Early life ==
Caley was born on 10 June 1770 in Yorkshire. His father was a horse dealer. Caley attended the Free Grammar School at Manchester and began working for his father. He taught himself botany by studying William Withering's Botanical Arrangement (1787–92). He got himself a job at Kew Gardens and spent more time with associates at the Manchester School of Botanists. He started corresponding with Sir Joseph Banks in 1795.

Caley emigrated to Sydney arriving on 15 April 1800. He was employed by Banks as a botanical collector and lived in Parramatta in a cottage provided by the government. Caley travelled to Western Port, the Cow Pastures region, Norfolk Island and Hobart. He also travelled to Cataract River, which he named, the Blue Mountains, Mount Tomah, and Mount Banks, which he named for Banks. In 1804, he made a report to New South Wales Governor Philip Gidley King entitled "A Journey to Ascertain the Limits or Boundaries of Vaccary Forest".

In 1810, he returned to England. Caley married in 1816. Around 1816, he became the curator of the St Vincent botanic gardens, a role in which he served until 1822. Later, he returned to England.

== Death and legacy ==
Caley died in England on 23 May 1829. He was 59. He had been predeceased by his wife. The couple had no children.

A memorial to him was unveiled on the Blue Mountains, 150 years after he climbed Mount King George.

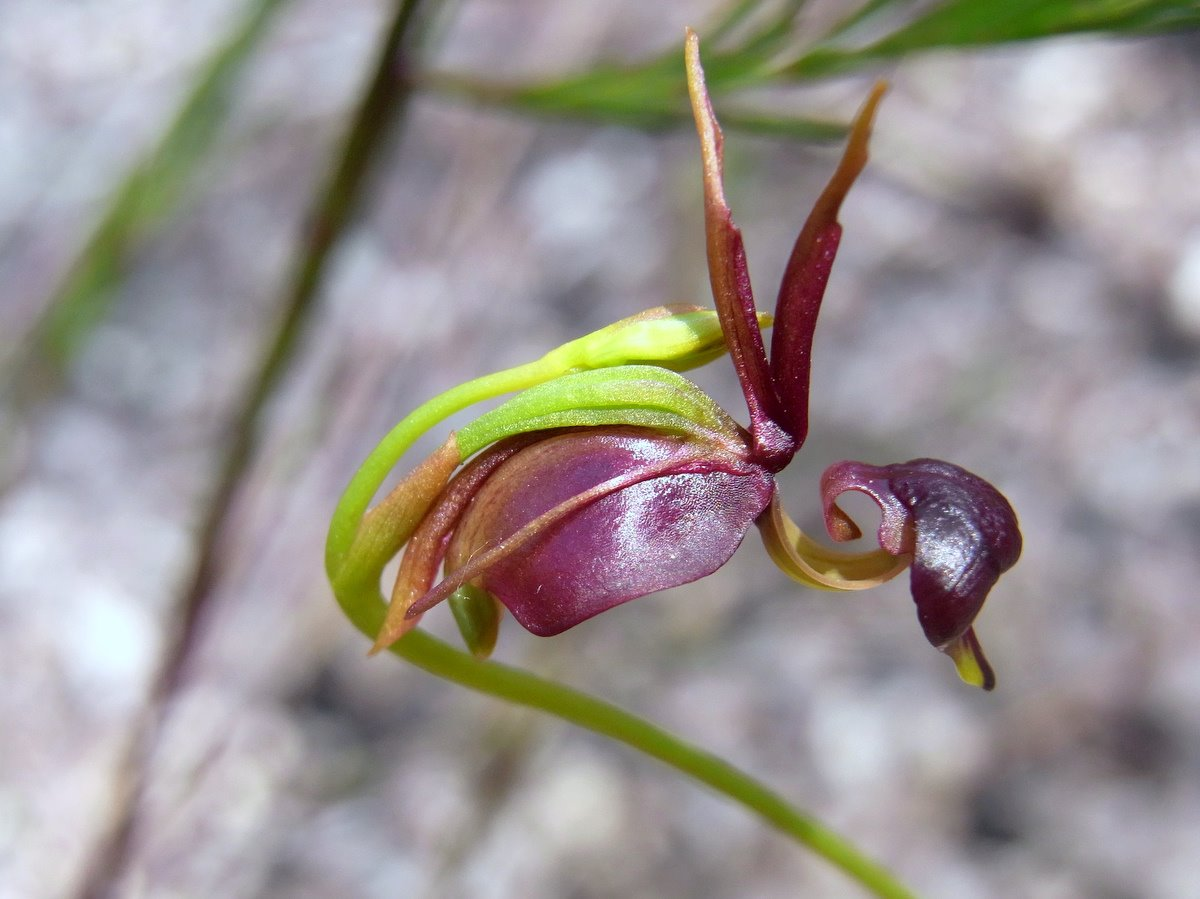
Caleana, the Flying Duck Orchid, named after George Caley

== Botanical name ==
This botanist is denoted by the author abbreviation Caley when citing a botanical name. He is recognised in several place names, including a Reserve name and bushland pavilion name at Ku-ring-gai Wildflower Garden in St Ives, and in the orchid genus Caleana and the species Grevillea caleyi, Viola caleyana, Banksia caleyi, and Eucalyptus caleyi. A George Caley Society was formed in Saint Ives (New South Wales) in 2019.

== See also ==
- List of Blue Mountains articles
- List of gardener-botanist explorers of the Enlightenment

== Bibliography ==
- Webb, J. B., (2003), ‘George Caley – Robert Brown’s collecting partner’, Australian Garden History, 15 (1), pp. 15–16.

Additional sources listed by the Australian Dictionary of Biography:

Historical Records of New South Wales, vols 3-6; J. Cash, Where There's a Will there's a Way, or Science in the Cottage (London, 1873); J. H. Maiden, Sir Joseph Banks (Sydney, 1909); J. H. Maiden, ‘George Caley, Botanical Collector in NSW’, Agricultural Gazette of New South Wales, 14 (1904); R. Else-Mitchell, ‘George Caley: His Life and Work’, Journal and Proceedings (Royal Australian Historical Society), vol 25, part 6, 1939, pp 437–542; L. A. Gilbert, Botanical Investigation of Eastern Seaboard Australia, 1788-1810 (M.A. thesis, University of New England, 1962); manuscript catalogue under G. Caley (State Library of New South Wales); G. Caley letters (State Library of New South Wales)
