= St Ives Chase =

- Suburb
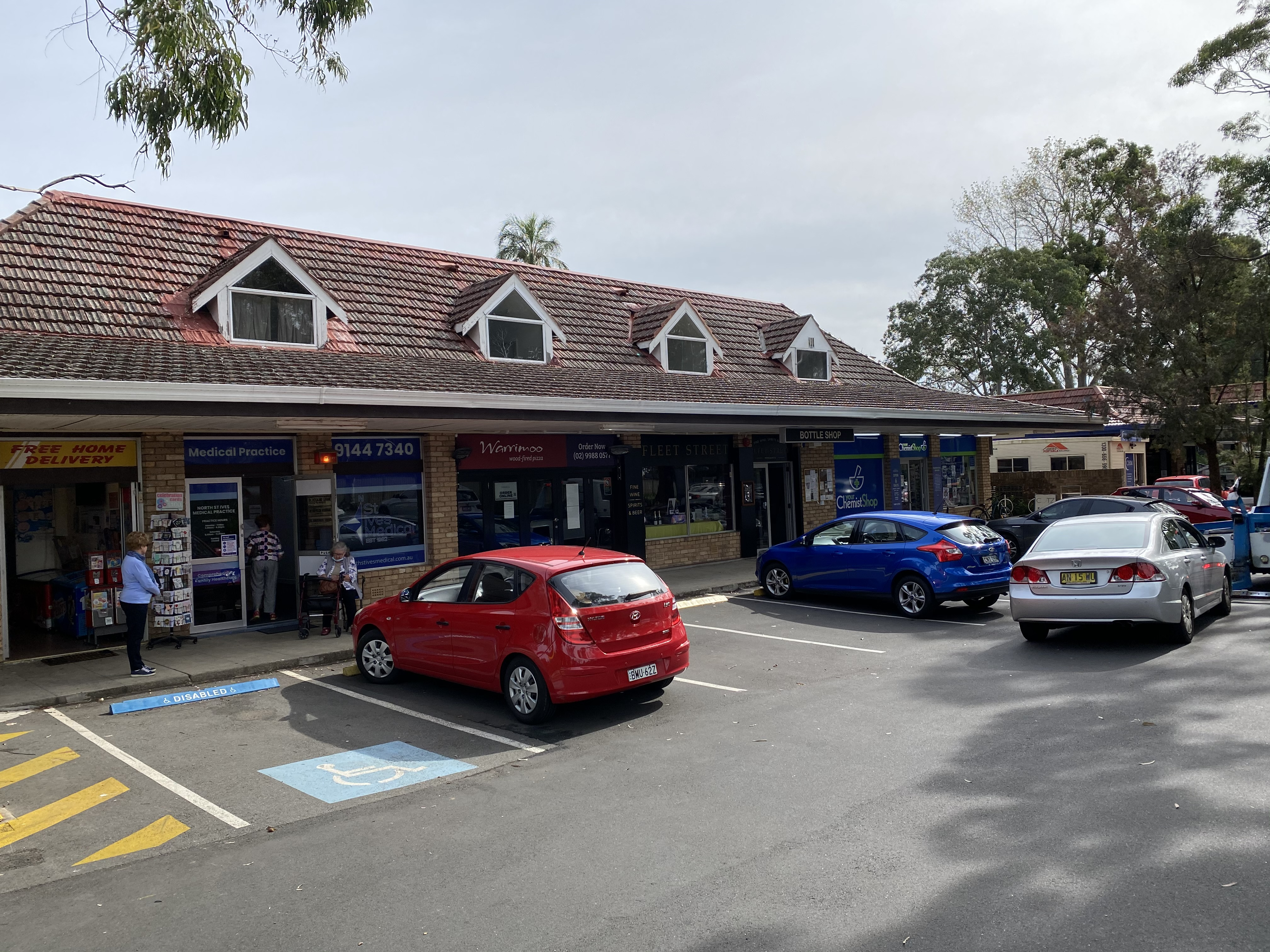
- St Ives Chase shopping complex

- Interactive map of St Ives Chase
- Country: Australia
- State: New South Wales
- City: Sydney
- LGA: Ku-ring-gai Council
- Location: 18 km (11 mi) north-west of Sydney CBD
- Established: 1855

Government
  - State electorate: Davidson
  - Federal division: Bradfield

Area
  - Total: 3.53 km^{2} (1.36 sq mi)
- Elevation: 156 m (512 ft)

Population
  - Total: 3,283 (2021 census)
  - Density: 930.0/km^{2} (2,409/sq mi)
- Postcode: 2075
Suburbs around St Ives Chase
North Turramurra	Ku-ring-gai Chase National Park	Ku-ring-gai Chase National Park
North Turramurra; St Ives	St Ives Chase	North St Ives
St Ives	St Ives	St Ives

St Ives Chase is a bushland suburb on the Upper North Shore of Sydney in the state of New South Wales, Australia. St Ives Chase is 18 kilometres north-west of the Sydney Central Business District in the local government area of Ku-ring-gai Council. St Ives is a more developed adjacent suburb and St Ives Chase covers the area approximately north of Toolang Road and west of Kuringai Creek. The neighbouring suburb of North Turramurra is separated by a section of the Ku-ring-gai Chase National Park. It is a separate suburb from St Ives, which lies to its south.

== Transport ==
By road, St Ives Chase can only be accessed via St Ives. Warrimoo Avenue is the main road used to access streets in St Ives Chase. Many properties sit very close to the bush. As St Ives Chase has no through traffic, there are rarely traffic delays in the suburb. Residents driving from St Ives Chase will first encounter peak hour traffic trying to join or cross Killeaton Street or Mona Vale Road in St Ives. A common route to the city is via the North Shore's Eastern Arterial Road.

Buses to St Ives Chase include CDC NSW route 195 to/from Gordon railway station and route 194/594 from St Ives through St Ives Chase to the city. North Turramurra and Bobbin Head are accessible via bush tracks in the National Park.

== Commercial zone ==
St Ives Chase is almost entirely zoned for either residential or recreational means. The suburb does have a small shopping complex of 5 shops which include a medical centre, seven-day corner shop ( closed ), a liquor shop, a chemist, a cafe and a hair dresser. The adjacent Metro Petroleum petrol station and St Ives chase service centre are the only other commercial outlets in the area.

== Population ==
At the 2021 census, St Ives Chase recorded a population of 3,283. Of these:

- The median age was 42 years. Children aged 0–14 years made up 23.5% of the population and people aged 65 years and over made up 18.9% of the population.
- 51.8% were born in Australia; the next most common countries of birth were China 12.6%, South Africa 7.8%, England 6.6%, Hong Kong 2.3% and India 1.9%.
- 65.3% spoke English at home; other languages spoken at home included Mandarin 16.4%, Cantonese 3.9%, Persian 1.5%, Spanish 1.2% and Korean 1.0%.
- 90.2% of households were family households, 8.8% were single person households and 1.0% were group households.

== Wildlife ==
Situated in the national park, St Ives Chase is the home to a wide variety of flora and fauna, particularly prevalent are brush turkeys. In recent years there has been a rabbit problem in the area, and there have been many attempts to eradicate rabbits in the St Ives Chase side of the National Park.

== Sport and clubs ==
There are two sports grounds in the area, Warrimoo Oval, which is home to the St Ives Football Club, and Toolang Oval, which hosts junior Football and Cricket.

Also located near St Ives Chase near Warrimoo Oval is the North St Ives Scout Club which is a club for children and teenagers run by family volunteers.
