= Warrawee =

- Suburb
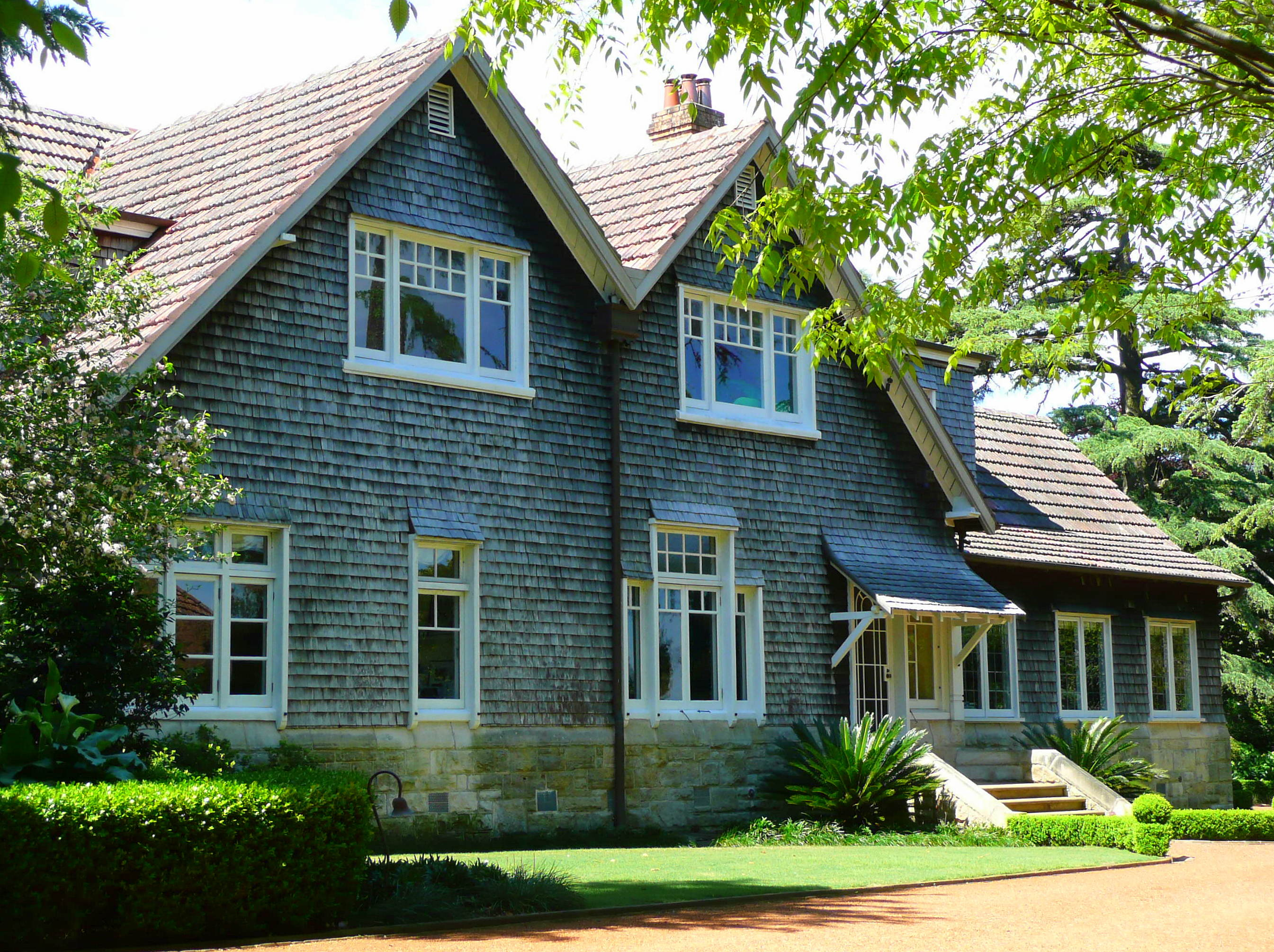
- Pibrac, Pibrac Avenue

- Interactive map of Warrawee
- Country: Australia
- State: New South Wales
- City: Sydney
- LGA: Ku-ring-gai Council
- Location: 16 km (9.9 mi) north-west of Sydney CBD
- Established: Early 1800s

Government
  - State electorate: Wahroonga
  - Federal division: Bradfield

Area
  - Total: 1.3 km^{2} (0.50 sq mi)
- Elevation: 189 m (620 ft)

Population
  - Total: 3,170 (2021 census)
  - Density: 2,440/km^{2} (6,320/sq mi)
- Postcode: 2074
Suburbs around Warrawee
Wahroonga	Wahroonga	Turramurra
Wahroonga	Warrawee	Turramurra
Wahroonga	Turramurra	Turramurra

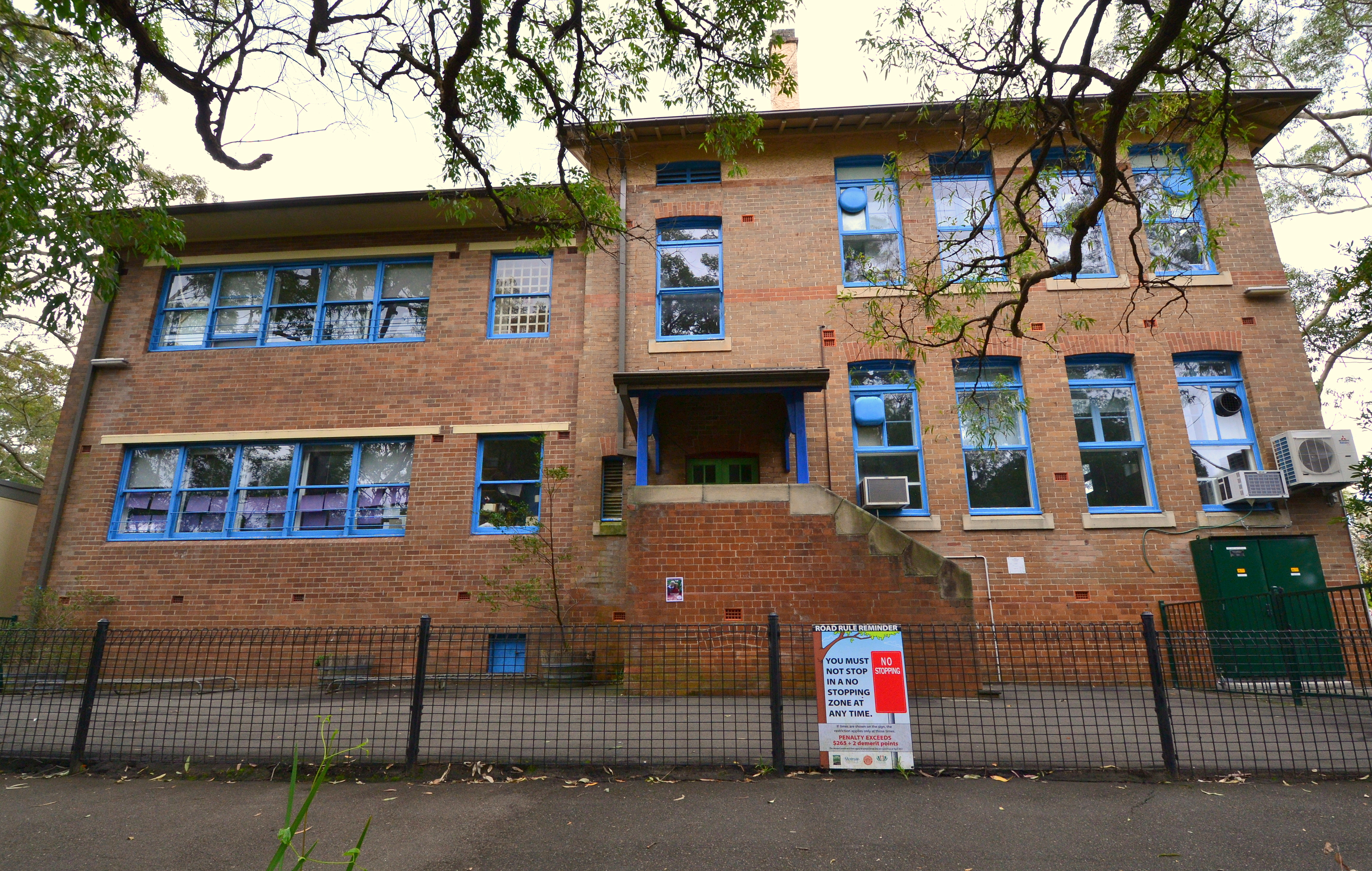
Warrawee Public School

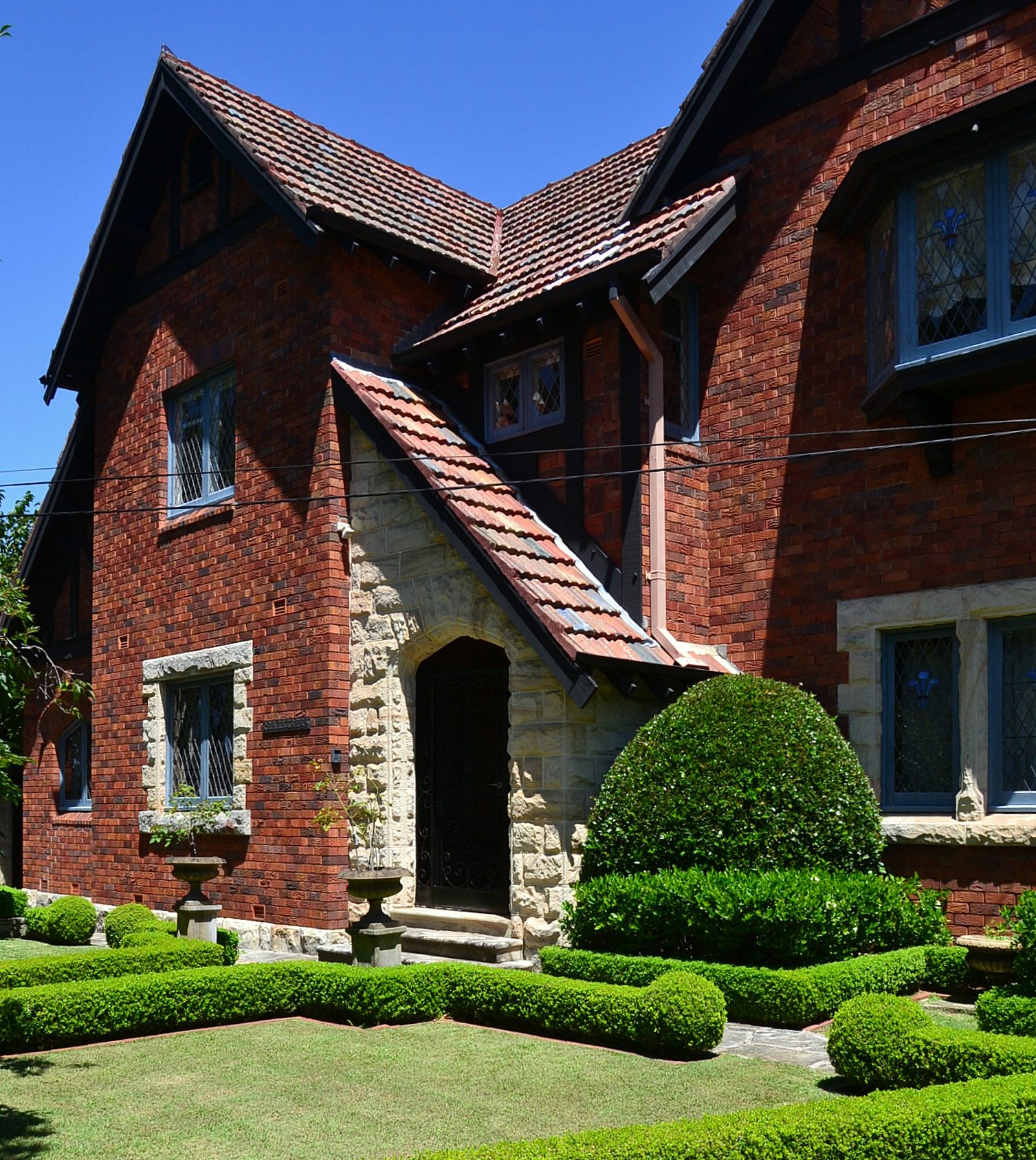
Chauntreys, Heydon Avenue.

Warrawee is a suburb on the Upper North Shore of Sydney in the state of New South Wales, Australia. Warrawee is located 17 kilometres north-west of the Sydney Central Business District, in the local government area of Ku-ring-gai Council. Warrawee is predominantly a residential suburb with few commercial entities. Notably, its railway station supports no commercial activities, which is uncommon on the Sydney train network. The closest thing to commercial activity is Knox Grammar School, which is no more than 200 metres from the station, although it is officially located in Wahroonga, it is located predominantly in Warrawee, and sits on the boundary of the two suburbs

The suburb should not be confused with Wirrawee, the fictional small country town in the Tomorrow series of books for young people by John Marsden, or the film derived from the first book, Tomorrow, When the War Began (2010).

== History ==
The name Warrawee is believed to be an Aboriginal word meaning rest a while, stop here or to stand.

The suburb has a notable architectural history, with a number of houses designed by prominent architects. The earliest significant homes were Pibrac (1888), Cheddington (1890) and Wirepe (1893).

In 1888, the public servant and patron of exploration, Frederick Eccleston Du Faur, built his house Pibrac in Pibrac Avenue. The house was designed by John Horbury Hunt, a Canadian architect who settled in Australia and favoured the Arts and Crafts style, as well as the North American Shingle style, which he introduced to Australia. Later alterations were carried out by B.J. Waterhouse. The house is built predominantly of timber, with extensive use of timber shingles, on a sandstone base. It is considered a good example of Hunt's work and is listed on the Register of the National Estate.

Cheddington, the oldest home in established Hastings Road, is also attributed to Horbury Hunt, constructed in brick, with a slate roof and characteristic shingling. Wirepe, designed by M.B. Halligan for architect Walter Traill, uses deep verandahs and high ceilings to elicit a homestead atmosphere, with fine corbelled chimneys and cedar shingles. The brickwork is laid in colonial bond, and the house sits at the heart of the Ku-ring-gai heritage precinct on Hastings Road.

Upton Grey (now Kooyong) was built in 1894 to a John Sulman design, and its English features are a local landmark. Across the century it has served as a government social services home, a CSIRO field station, and a boarding house for Knox Grammar School. It is now in private hands and retains features replicated at Sulman's important Ingleholme.

Exley House, in Finlay Road, Warrawee, was designed by Harry Seidler in 1957 for Cecil Exley, an engineer with the Sydney Water Board, and his wife. The three-bedroom, two-bathroom home is the only red-brick single-storey dwelling Harry Seidler designed. It has recently been sympathetically extended.

As with all North Shore suburbs with Aboriginal names, Warrawee was the name of a railway station which was then attached to the surrounding suburb. Warrawee developed in the early 20th century as an exclusive residential district, with no shops, offices, post office, public school, churches or through roads. In 1923, Knox Grammar School was founded at Earlston, a Warrawee property across the railway line. All blocks were kept to between 1 and 4 acres (0.4 and 1.6 hectares), and the form of houses was tightly controlled. Joseph Beresford Grant used his money to guarantee the exclusiveness of the development, and also ensured that there were no shops around the area.

== Transport ==
The Pacific Highway is the main arterial road. Warrawee railway station is on the North Shore railway line on the Sydney Trains network. The railway station built in 1900 was the last one built on the North Shore Line before it was extended to North Sydney. Local residents had to fight the railway commissioners for a railway station, that is only one kilometre from Wahroonga.

At the 2021 census, 3.7% of employed people travelled to work on public transport compared to 4.6% average for all of Australia, while 25.5% travelled by car (either as driver or as passenger) compared to 57.8% nationally.

CDC NSW operates one bus route through the suburb of Warrawee:

- 573: Turramurra to Sydney Adventist Hospital

== Demographics ==
At the 2021 census, the suburb of Warrawee recorded a population of 3,170 people. Of these:

- Age distribution: The median age of Warrawee residents was 42 years. Children aged under 15 years made up 18.1% of the population and people aged 65 years and over made up 17.3% of the population.
- Ethnic diversity: More than half (57.7%) of residents were born in Australia, compared to the national average of 66.9%; the next most common countries of birth were China 10.3%, England 4.8%, India 3.3%, South Africa 3.0%, and South Korea 2.4%. The most common ancestries in Warrawee were English 34.0%, Australian 23.7%, Chinese 20.2%, Scottish 10.8%, and Irish 9.4%.
- Finances: The median weekly household income was $3,388, more than double the national median of $1,746. Real estate values were correspondingly high: the median monthly mortgage repayments were $3,500 compared to the national median of $1,863.

Housing
The majority (84.3%) of private dwellings were family households, 14.7% were single person households and 1.0% were group households. Separate houses accounted for 63.9% of dwellings, while 30.6% were flats or apartments and about 4.7% were semi-detached.

== Schools ==
Warrawee Public School is a primary school situated about 0.5 kilometres to the south of the station in Turramurra, on the Pacific Highway. According to the school's website, it was established in 1906.

Knox Grammar School is predominately in the suburb of Warrawee, and sits no more than 200m from Warrawee railway station. The school lists its address as Wahroonga since the Administration Office is situated within that suburb.

== Notable residents ==
- Joseph Beresford Grant (1877–1942), developer and investor in Warrawee as an exclusive residential area. He lived from 1913 in Rowerdenan, Warrawee Avenue.
- Eleanor Cullis-Hill (1913–2001), architect and daughter of Joseph Beresford Grant
- Sir Charles Mackellar and his daughter, poet Dorothea Mackellar
- Olive Fitzhardinge, resident 1917–1937, breeder of the rose 'Warrawee' especially, lived with Dr Fitzhardinge at Bridge End, 1 Warrawee Avenue.
- Kandiah Kamalesvaran known as Kamahl, singer
- Sir John Seymour Proud (1907–1997), chief executive of Peko-Wallsend
