= Ku-ring-gai Wildflower Garden =

Botanic gardens in northern Sydney

Coordinates: 33°42′28″S 151°10′38″E

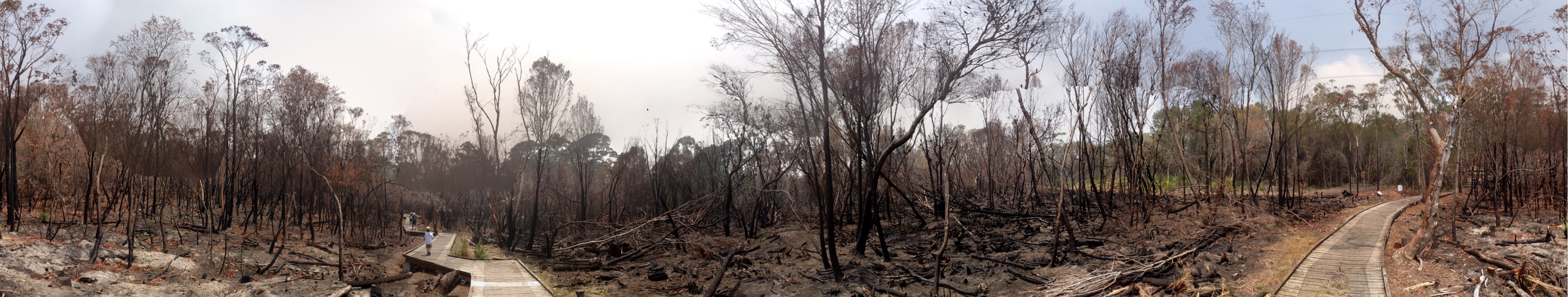
- Interactive map of Ku-ring-gai Wildflower Garden
- Type: Wildflower garden
- Location: St Ives, Sydney, New South Wales
- Area: 123 hectares (300 acres)
- Established: 1966
- Website: www.krg.nsw.gov.au/Things-to-do/Ku-ring-gai-Wildflower-Garden

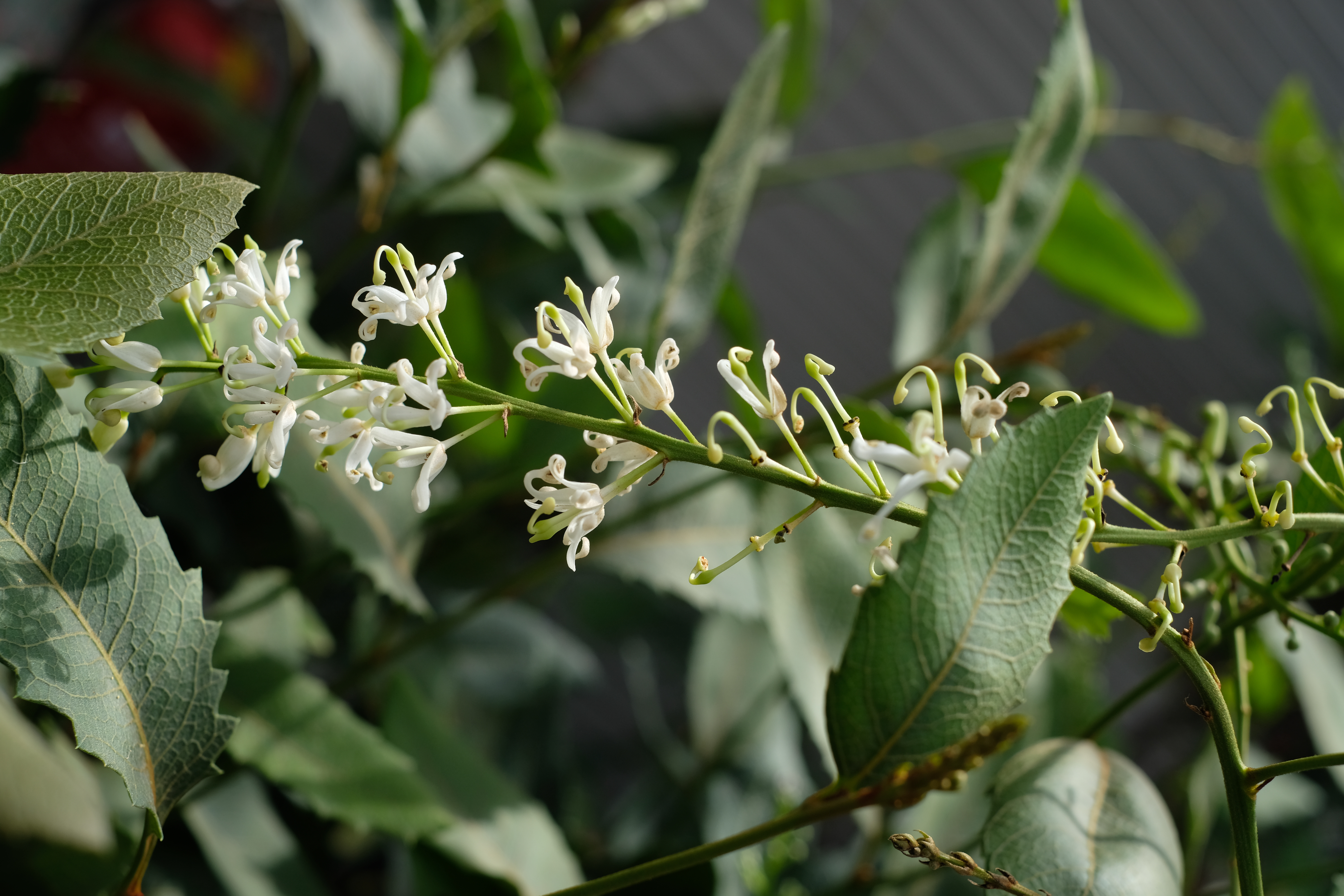
Lomatia ilicifolia in Ku-ring-gai Wildflower Garden

Ku-ring-gai Wildflower Garden is a 123-hectare (300-acre) botanical garden in St Ives, in the Local Government Area of Ku-ring-gai Council on the Upper North Shore region of Sydney, New South Wales, Australia.

== History ==
The Garden was established in 1966 by John Wrigley on behalf of Ku-ring-gai Council. (Wrigley went on to establish the Australian National Botanic Gardens in Canberra in 1970.) It was opened by the then Governor of New South Wales, Sir Roden Cutler VC, in 1968.

== Features ==
All of the plants in the Garden are Australian natives. Swamp wallabies are found within the garden. The dominant species of birds found in the garden are honeyeaters. Lamberts Clearing (named after the botanist Aylmer Bourke Lambert) is an open green space, and has a covered picnic area. There is a Fern House, which houses cycads, mossy ponds and ferns, and a Knoll Garden, which is a bush garden. Mueller Track (named after the first director of the Royal Botanic Gardens, Melbourne, Ferdinand von Mueller) is a path into the valley below the carpark. Ku-ring-gai Creek and Tree Fern Gully Creek intersect at Whipbird Gully. There is a nursery within the garden for the purchase of plants. Caley's Pavilion (named after the botanist George Caley) is a function room, available for wedding hire.

There is a Wildflower & Garden Festival on the last Sunday of August each year.

An elderly volunteer, Gaida Coote, disappeared in 2014, having attended a volunteer bush care group; her remains were only found in 2019.
