= Eleanor Cullis-Hill =

Sydney based Australian architect

Eleanor Cullis–Hill
- Born: Eleanor Beresford Grant; 4 November 1913; Warrawee, New South Wales
- Died: 8 September 2001 (aged 87)
- Known for: Architecture
- Spouse: Grandison Cullis-Hill (m. 1938)

Eleanor Cullis–Hill (4 November 1913 – 8 September 2001) was an Australian architect. Running a solo practice from her home between 1946 and 1981, she designed dozens of buildings and renovations, mostly residential, on Sydney's North Shore.

== Early life and education ==
Cullis–Hill was born Eleanor Beresford Grant in 1913 in Warrawee, New South Wales, a suburb of Sydney. Her father was Joseph Beresford Grant, a businessman in real estate. She attended Frensham School in Mittagong and went on to study architecture at the University of Sydney, Sydney School of Architecture, Design and Planning. She graduated in 1938.

== Career ==
Cullis–Hill began working as a professional architect after the Second World War. In a contract position with the New South Wales Housing Commission, she designed houses as part of Sydney's postwar reconstruction boom. She set up a solo practice in 1946 at her own home in Warrawee, since she felt that women architects were unwelcome in large firms. Initially, she accepted commissions from friends, and through word-of-mouth recommendations she received enough projects to keep her in full-time work.

Cullis–Hill worked mainly on Sydney's North Shore in the suburbs of Warrawee and Wahroonga, but she also designed residential renovations and houses in East Killara, Hunters Hill, Kenthurst, Pymble and Turramurra. In total, she designed more than 30 houses and around 50 residential alterations. She also designed church and school buildings: these included additions to Gib Gate School in Mittagong (1954–1973) and St James' Anglican Church in Turramurra (1957–1975) as well as the original plans for Wahroonga Nursery School (1954–1955) and the Turramurra Nursery School (1961). Her design for the Wahroonga Nursery School was shortlisted for the Australian Institute of Architects' Sulman Award in 1956.

Cullis-Hill retired in 1981 and died in 2001.

== Legacy ==
Cullis–Hill is recognised by the Australian Institute of Architects annual national award the Eleanor Cullis-Hill Award for Residential Architecture – Houses (Alterations and Additions).

== Family ==
In 1938 she married Grandison Cullis-Hill, a fellow architecture student at the University of Sydney who partnered with Rupert Minnert in architectural practice in Crows Nest. They had four children—Caroline, Josephine, Mary and David—and lived in a house on Bangalla Street in Warrawee that she designed. Her two eldest daughters, Caroline Martin and Josephine Roberts, also became architects.
