= Warrawee railway station =

Railway station in Sydney, New South Wales, Australia

Warrawee
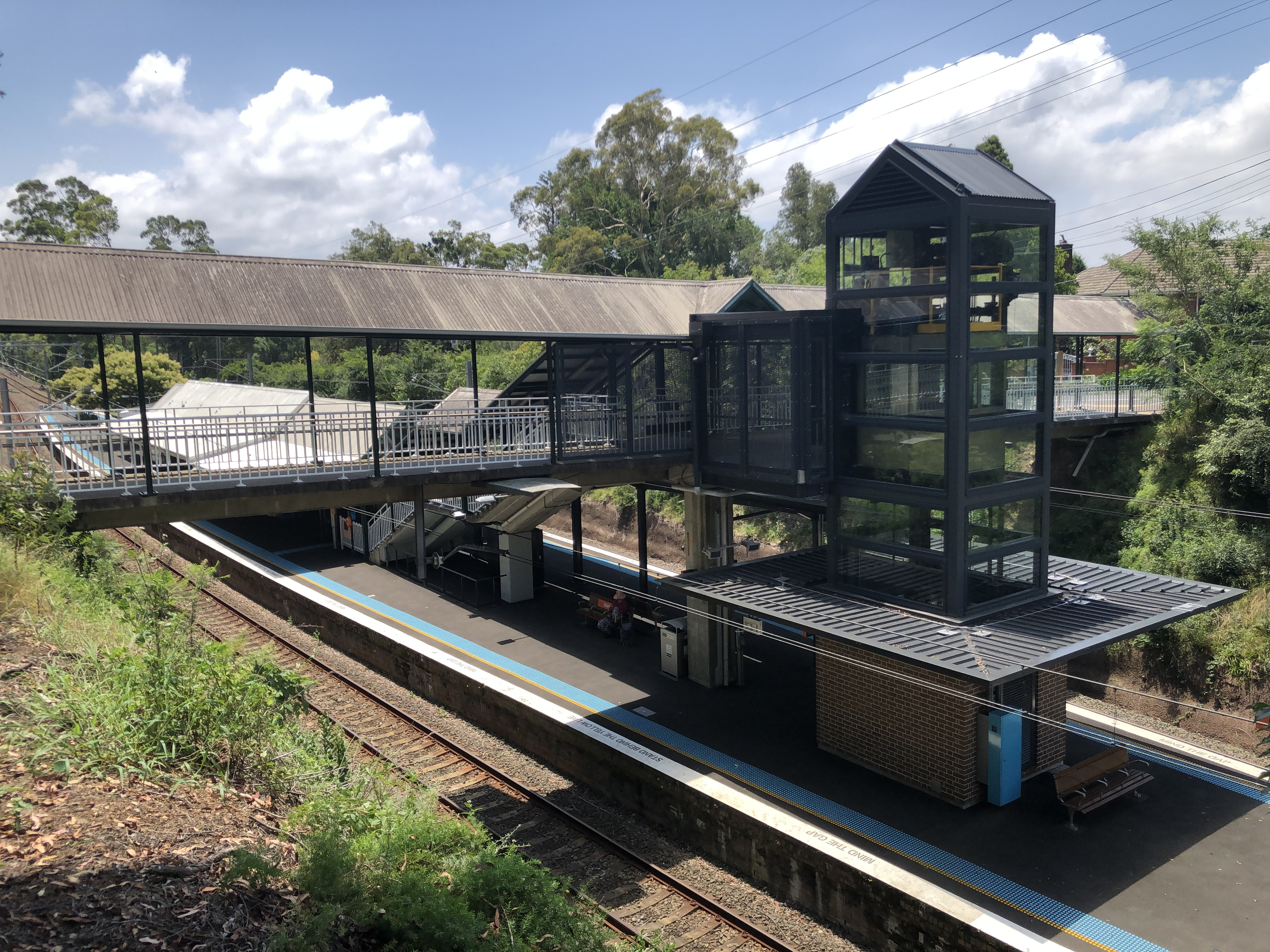
- Station platform, building and entrance, in January 2022

General information
- Location: Heydon Avenue, Warrawee, New South Wales, Australia
- Coordinates: 33°43′27″S 151°07′18″E
- Elevation: 188 metres (617 ft)
- Owner: Transport Asset Manager of NSW
- Operator: Sydney Trains
- Line: North Shore
- Distance: 21.89 km (13.60 mi) from Central
- Platforms: 2 (1 island)
- Tracks: 2
- Connections: Bus

Construction
- Structure type: Ground
- Accessible: Yes

Other information
- Status: Weekdays: Staffed: 6am to 7pm: Weekends and public holidays: Unstaffed
- Station code: WWE
- Website: Transport for NSW

History
- Opened: 1 August 1900 (126 years ago)
- Electrified: Yes (from 1927)

Passengers
- 2023: 412,380 (year); 1,130 (daily) (Sydney Trains, NSW TrainLink)

Services
Preceding station	Sydney Trains	Following station
Turramurra towards City	North Shore & Western Line	Wahroonga towards Berowra
Location

Warrawee railway station is a suburban railway station located on the North Shore line, serving the Sydney suburb of Warrawee. It is served by Sydney Trains T1 North Shore & Western Line services.

== History ==
Warrawee station opened on 1 August 1900. It was named after an Aboriginal word which means "stop here". It was suggested to the late Mr. Remington (who was largely responsible for securing it) by Mr. J. G. Edwards. A new footbridge was installed in 1977, which had a steel roof added in 1995 for weather protection. In 2009, the platforms were repaired and resurfaced.

In August of 2020, Warrawee Station received a major renovation including the addition of an elevator from concourse to the platforms as part of the transport access program. This greatly improved access to the station.

== Services ==
=== Platforms ===
Platform	Line	Stopping pattern	Notes
1	T1	services to Epping & Hornsby via Strathfield, Richmond, Penrith & Emu Plains	
2	T1	services to Hornsby and Berowra	

=== Transport links ===
CDC NSW operates one bus route via Warrawee station, under contract to Transport for NSW:

- 573: Turramurra to Sydney Adventist Hospital

Warrawee station is served by one NightRide route:

- N90: Hornsby station to Town Hall station
