= North Turramurra =

Coordinates: 33.72615°S 151.14712°E

- Suburb
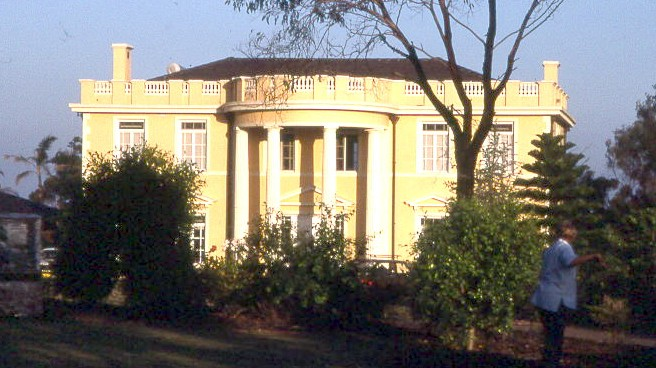
- Home in Bobbin Head Road
- Interactive map of North Turramurra
- Country: Australia
- State: New South Wales
- City: Sydney
- LGA: Ku-ring-gai Council
- Location: 22 km (14 mi) NW of Sydney
- Established: 5 August, 1994 (Separated from Turramurra

Government
  - State electorate: Davidson
  - Federal division: Bradfield

Area
  - Total: 11.74 km^{2} (4.53 sq mi)
- Elevation: 163 m (535 ft)

Population
  - Total: 4,194 (2021 census)
  - Density: 357.24/km^{2} (925.2/sq mi)
- Postcode: 2074
Suburbs around North Turramurra
North Wahroonga	Ku-ring-gai Chase National Park	Ku-ring-gai Chase National Park
Wahroonga	North Turramurra	St Ives Chase
Turramurra	Pymble	St Ives

North Turramurra is a suburb on the Upper North Shore of Sydney, in the state of New South Wales, Australia. North Turramurra is located 20 kilometres (12 mi) north-west of the Sydney central business district, in the local government area of Ku-ring-gai Council. Turramurra and South Turramurra are separate suburbs.

== History ==
Turramurra is an Aboriginal word which is thought to mean either big hill, high place, or small watercourse. Early settlers referred to the area as Eastern Road until the name Turramurra was adopted when Turramurra railway station was built in 1890. Eastern Road was an area of orchards. Samuel King, born in 1828 in County Donegal Ireland, arrived in Sydney in 1853. With his wife Ann, he established several orchards along Bobbin Head Road and at North Turramurra and was a noted church and community supporter.

Eccleston du Faur secured the name Turramurra. Du Faur was born in England in 1832 and was recognised in Sydney as a supporter of the arts and sciences. He was elected a Fellow of the Royal Geographical Society in 1875 and was an early bush conservationist. Most importantly, Du Faur secured the land for the Ku-ring-gai Chase National Park from the government of the day. The Chase was declared in 1894. Du Faur personally funded and made a road through the bushland to Bobbin Head. In 1895 he built a house on 25 acres (100,000 m^{2}) at the Chase Gates. After his death in 1915, part of this property became Lady Davidson Home, a convalescent hospital, later Lady Davidson Hospital.

North Turramurra became a separate suburb from Turramurra when it was officially gazetted as on 5 August 1994.

== Landmarks ==
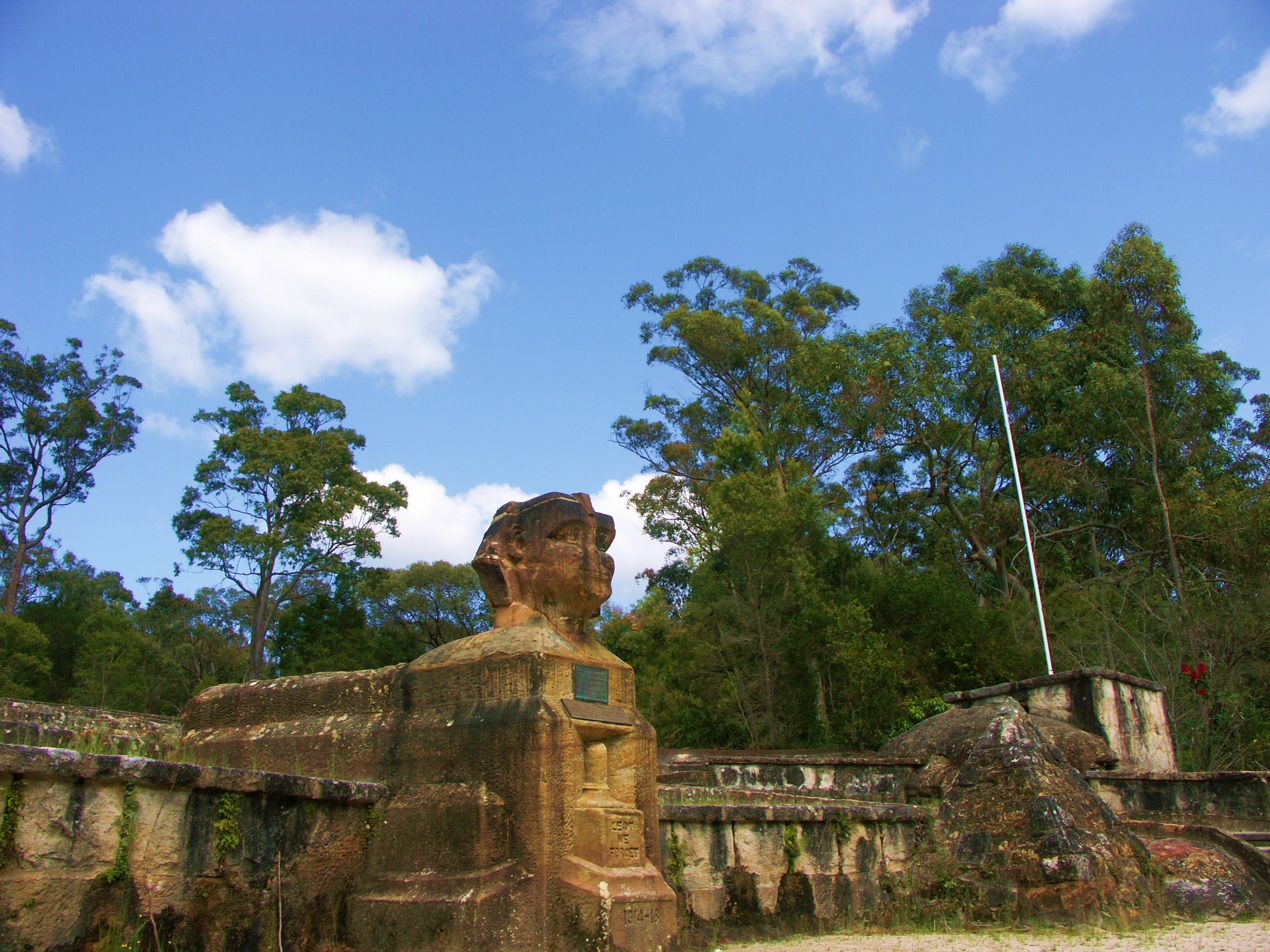
The Sphinx Memorial in North Turramurra. Courtesy of Annette Teng

North Turramurra is home to the sphinx war memorial. This 1.5 m high replica of the Great Sphinx of Egypt was carved out of sandstone in the 1920s by William Shirley, a returned soldier, in memory of fallen comrades.

The suburb is a popular starting point for many bush walkers as it has easy access to Bobbin Head, the upper reaches of Cowan Creek and St Ives Chase.

== Geography ==
North Turramurra lies on a narrow spur between two creeks (Lovers Jump Creek and Cowan Creek) that flow eventually to the sea through the Ku-ring-gai Chase National Park on the northern outskirts of the city. The suburb is the northern boundary of the Ku-ring-gai Council. The heavily forested valleys face a bushfire threat each summer, yet residents can regularly encounter a variety of native wildlife, often including wallabies.

== Population ==
At the 2021 census, North Turramurra recorded a population of 4,194. Of these:

- The age distribution is very unusual, due to the large number of aged care facilities. The median age was 56 years, compared to the national median of 38 years. Children aged under 15 years made up 14.1% of the population (the national average was 18.2%) and people aged 65 years and over made up 41.0% of the population (the national average was 17.2%).
- 64.7% were born in Australia; the next most common countries of birth were England 8.2%, China 3.6%, South Africa 3.4%, New Zealand 1.8% and India 1.2%.

== Commercial area ==
There is a shopping village in North Turramurra on Bobbin Head Road which has a supermarket, bakery, vet, restaurants, post office, newsagent and other facilities such as dentist, pathology and liquor store.

== Education ==
North Turramurra is home to two schools:

- Turramurra North Public School
- Ku-ring-gai High School

== Sport & Recreation ==
- 1st North Turramurra Scout Group
- Turramurra and Kissing Point Rover Scout Crews are nearby, offering outdoor adventure, social, and community service activities for ages 18-25.

== Climate ==
North Turramurra has warm, humid summers and cool-to-cold winters. North Turramurra has not been below freezing point for years and the last recorded snow fall was in 1836. North Turramurra gets rain all year round with the most in February (231.9mm). On 6 February 2010, North Turramurra received 180mm of rain in one day; almost a month of rain in a day and the most rain recorded since 1990. On 12/13 February 2010, North Turramurra received 60mm in a night and on 13 February 2010 80mm of rain was recorded in North Turramurra. The highest recorded temperature was 46 °C on 14 January 1939. -5 is an unofficial record low in 1836.

Climate data for North Turramurra
Month	Jan	Feb	Mar	Apr	May	Jun	Jul	Aug	Sep	Oct	Nov	Dec	Year
Record high °C (°F)	46 (115)	43 (109)	40 (104)	34 (93)	30 (86)	27 (81)	26 (79)	31 (88)	34 (93)	38 (100)	41 (106)	42 (108)	46 (115)
Mean daily maximum °C (°F)	26 (79)	25 (77)	24 (75)	22 (72)	19 (66)	16 (61)	16 (61)	17 (63)	20 (68)	22 (72)	24 (75)	25 (77)	22 (72)
Mean daily minimum °C (°F)	18 (64)	17 (63)	16 (61)	12 (54)	9 (48)	7 (45)	5 (41)	8 (46)	9 (48)	11 (52)	13 (55)	15 (59)	12 (54)
Record low °C (°F)	9 (48)	8 (46)	8 (46)	7 (45)	−1 (30)	−3 (27)	−5 (23)	−4 (25)	−1 (30)	3 (37)	4 (39)	7 (45)	−5 (23)
Average precipitation mm (inches)	200.1 (7.88)	231.9 (9.13)	160.4 (6.31)	134.4 (5.29)	109.7 (4.32)	117.5 (4.63)	97.3 (3.83)	83.2 (3.28)	81.1 (3.19)	101.6 (4.00)	112.1 (4.41)	125.9 (4.96)	1,515.2 (59.65)
Average precipitation days	17	22	15	14	12	11	10	11	12	12	12	13	161
Average relative humidity (%)	64	68	57	53	50	47	44	46	51	52	57	60	55
Mean monthly sunshine hours	223	190	194	189	179	164	175	200	208	222	230	240	2,482
Source: Bureau of Meteorology

== Transport ==
The nearest railway station is Turramurra. Buses to North Turramurra are operated by CDC NSW from Turramurra station. CDC NSW bus route 577 runs through North Turramurra. Burns Road creates a boundary with Turramurra, to the south.

== Hospitals ==
- Lady Davidson Private Hospital one of the largest dedicated rehabilitation hospital in Australia and has a long history of providing health services for veterans and private patients.
- North Turramurra Residential Aged Care is an aged care home run by Southern Cross Care (NSW & ACT). It was previously known as Nazareth House, with was founded by the Sisters of Nazareth. Southern Cross Care (NSW & ACT) took over operations in 2002. In 2019 the site underwent significant redevelopment to construct a new, 113-Suite aged care home. The site is also home to the historical Huon Park House (built 1896) and iconic, round chapel have undergone restoration.

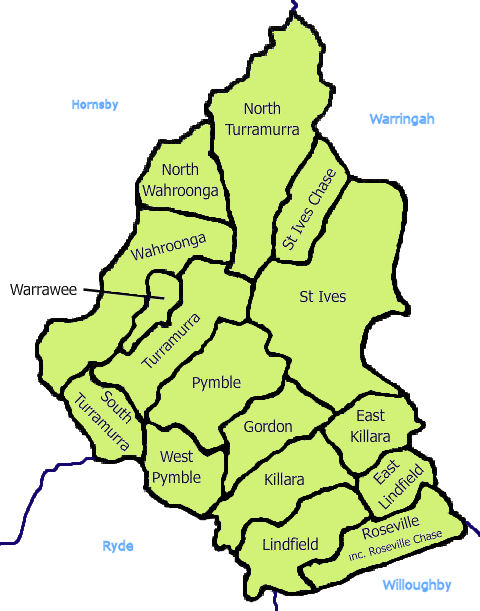
Ku-ring-gai Council area
