= Turramurra railway station =

Railway station in Sydney, New South Wales, Australia

Turramurra
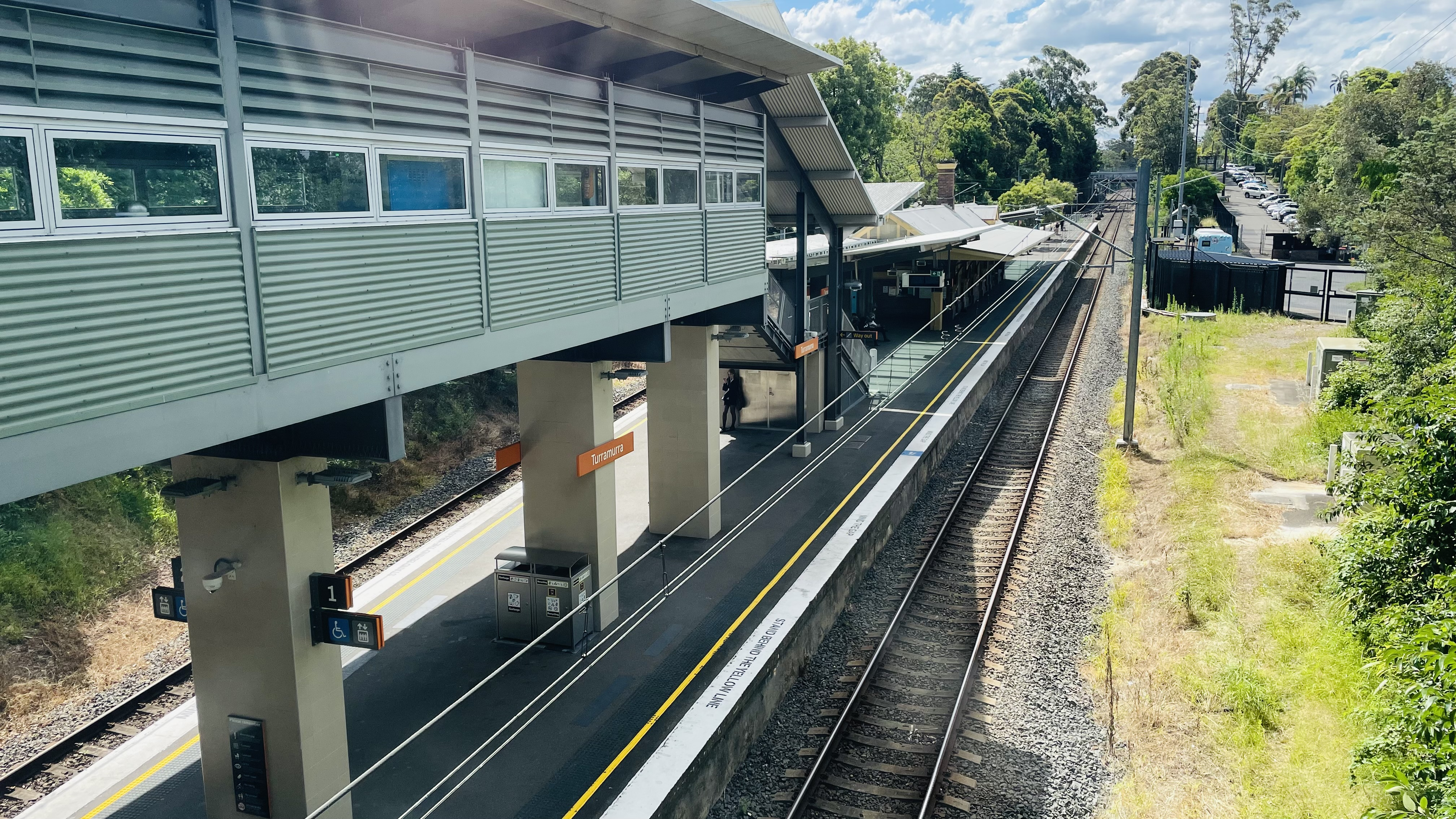
- Northbound view of building, entrance and platform in November 2022

General information
- Location: Rohini Street, Turramurra, New South Wales, Australia
- Coordinates: 33°43′57″S 151°07′42″E
- Elevation: 177 metres (581 ft)
- Owner: Transport Asset Manager of NSW
- Operator: Sydney Trains
- Line: North Shore
- Distance: 20.82 km (12.94 mi) from Central
- Platforms: 2 (1 island)
- Tracks: 2
- Connections: Bus

Construction
- Structure type: Ground
- Accessible: Yes

Other information
- Status: Weekdays: Staffed: 6am to 10pm: Weekends and public holidays: Staffed: 6am to 7pm
- Station code: TMU

History
- Opened: 1 January 1890 (136 years ago)
- Electrified: Yes (from 1927)
- Former names: Eastern Road (1890)

Passengers
- 2025: 1,866,005 (year); 5,112 (daily) (Sydney Trains)
- Rank: 81

Services
Preceding station	Sydney Trains	Following station
Pymble towards City	North Shore & Western Line	Warrawee towards Berowra
Location

Turramurra railway station is a suburban railway station located on the North Shore line, serving the Sydney suburb of Turramurra. It is served by Sydney Trains T1 North Shore & Western Line services.

== History ==
Turramurra station opened on 1 January 1890 as Eastern Road when the North Shore line opened from Hornsby to St Leonards. It was renamed Turramurra on 30 August 1890. The present island platform and station building were completed in 1900.

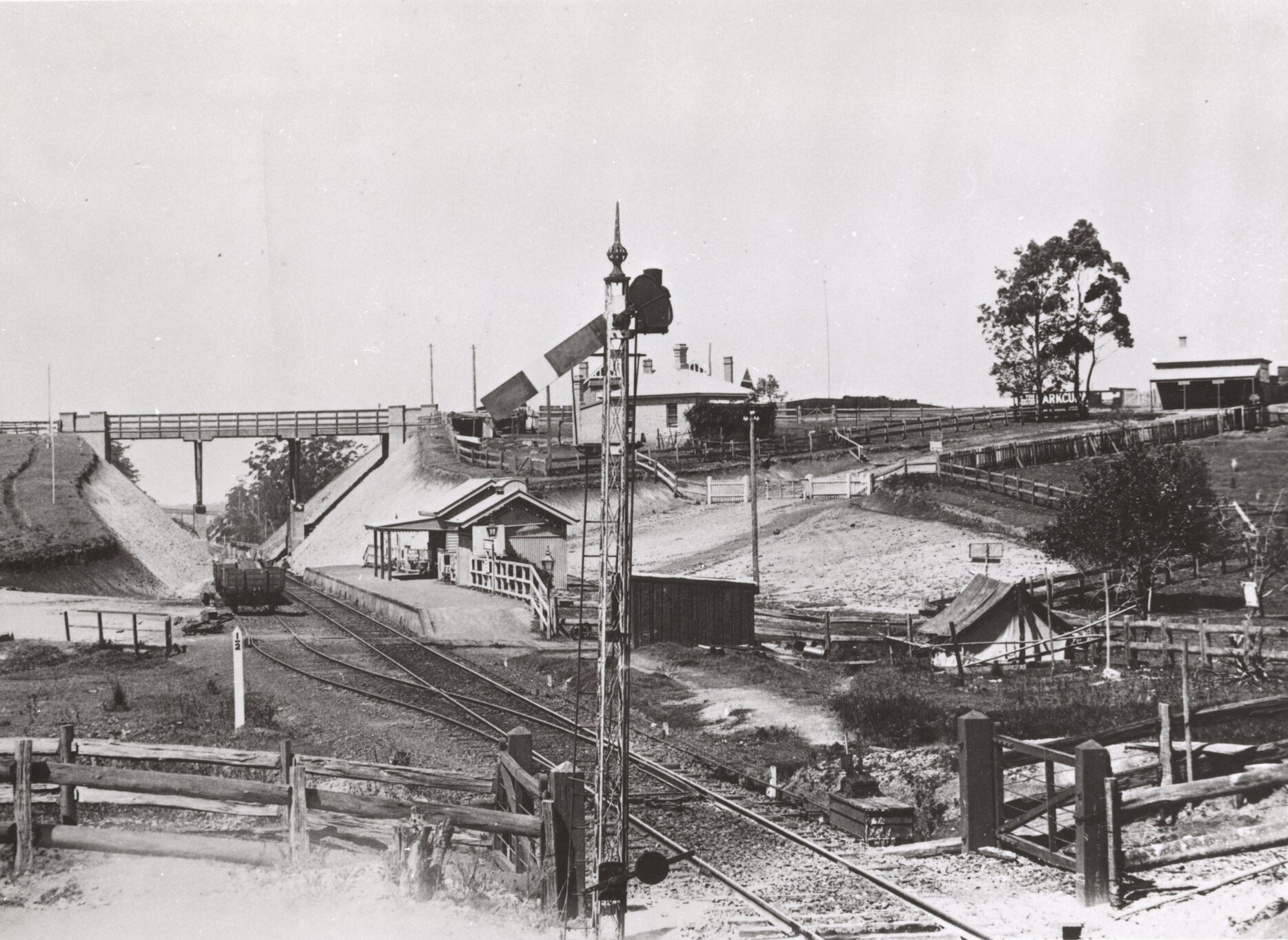
Turramurra station in the 1890s, before duplication of the line.

The district was originally known as Big Island, Vanceville and Claraville (after names of estates or grants), and further north as Tulip Scrub from the large number of tulips or waratahs there. Turramurra means "high hill" or "big hill". More than 100 years ago remnants of a tribe of Aboriginal people periodically travelled from the Lane Cove River to Cowan Creek and always broke their journey at what came to be called Wright's Hill, near Pymble Reservoir, or just north of it.

The traditional owners called this place Turramurra or Turraburra (not to be confused with Turramburra, the native name for the Lane Cove River). As no railway station was made there, it was applied to the station in the vicinity.

In 1977, a precast concrete footbridge was installed. This was replaced in 2008 by a new footbridge and lift.

== Services ==
=== Platforms ===
Platform	Line	Stopping pattern	Notes
1	North Shore & Western Line	services to Epping & Hornsby via Strathfield, Richmond, Penrith & Emu Plains	
2	North Shore & Western Line	services to Hornsby & Berowra	

=== Transport links ===
CDC NSW operates seven bus routes via Turramurra station, under contract to Transport for NSW:

Stand A:

- 573: to Fox Valley Loop via Warrawee Valley, Sydney Adventist Hospital, and then returns to Turramurra

Stand B:

- 575: to Hornsby station via North Wahroonga & Hornsby Hospital

Stand C:

- 571: to South Turramurra Loop (weekday peak hours only)
- 572: to Macquarie University via South Turramurra
- 575: to Macquarie University via Pymble

Stand D:

- 576T: to North Wahroonga Loop (weekday off-peak hours only)
- 577: to North Turramurra Loop
- 577P: East Turramurra Loop (weekday off-peak hours only)

Turramurra station is served by one NightRide route:

- N90: Hornsby station to Town Hall station

== Gallery ==
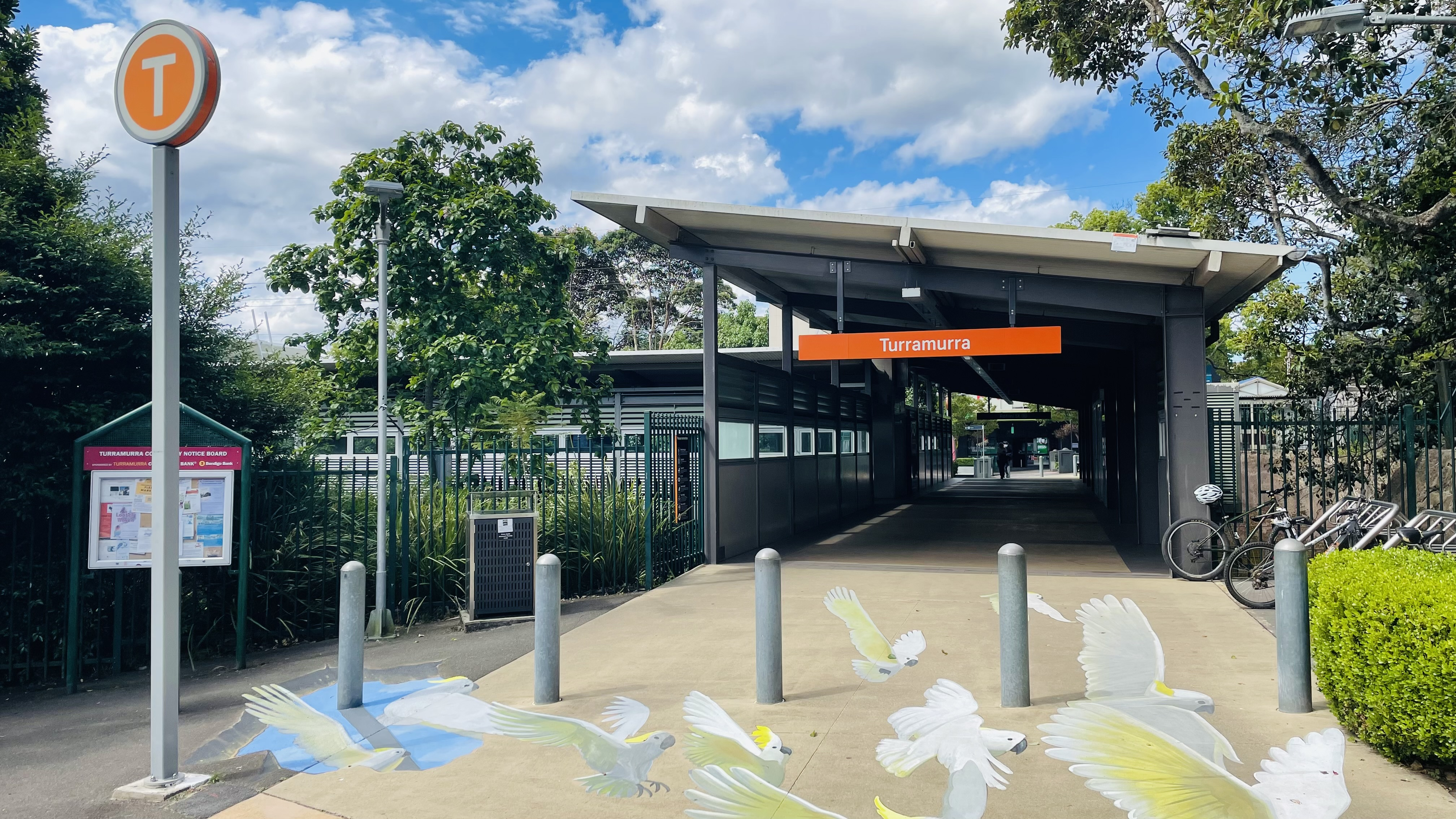
Entrance from William Street, November 2022
