= Viola caleyana =

Scientific classification
- Kingdom: Plantae
- Clade: Tracheophytes
- Clade: Angiosperms
- Clade: Eudicots
- Clade: Rosids
- Order: Malpighiales
- Family: Violaceae
- Genus: Viola
- Species: V. caleyana

Binomial name
- Viola caleyana G.Don

Species of shrub

Viola caleyana, commonly known as swamp violet, is a perennial shrub of the genus Viola native to southeastern Australia.
