= St Ives, New South Wales =

St Ives
- Suburb
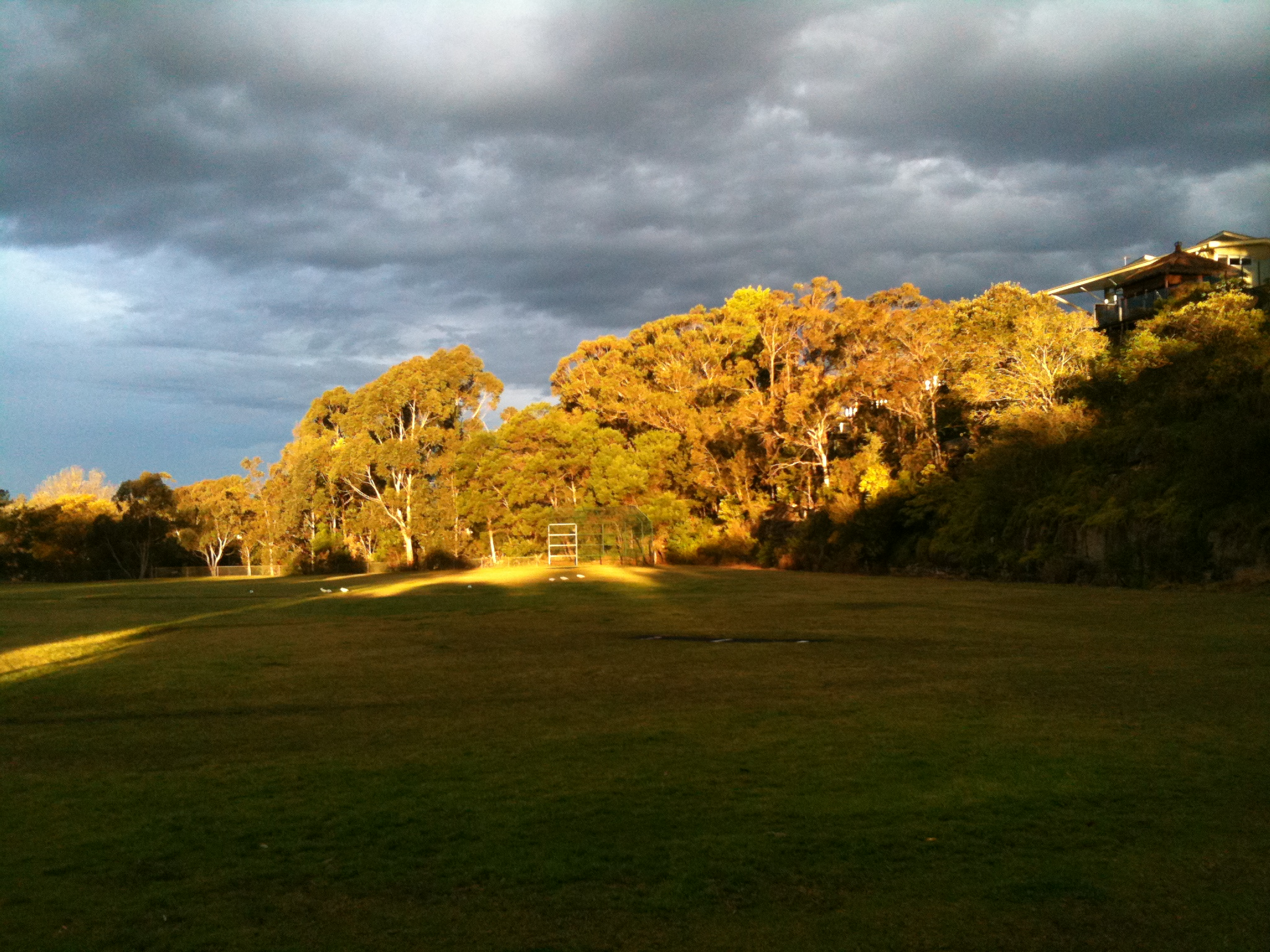
- Acron Oval

- Interactive map of St Ives
- Country: Australia
- State: New South Wales
- City: Sydney
- LGA: Ku-ring-gai Council
- Location: 18 km (11 mi) north of Sydney CBD
- Established: 1823

Government
  - State electorate: Davidson
  - Federal division: Bradfield

Area
  - Total: 14.39 km^{2} (5.56 sq mi)
- Elevation: 171 m (561 ft)

Population
  - Total: 18,384 (SAL 2021)
- Postcode: 2075
Suburbs around St Ives
| St Ives Chase | Ku-ring-gai Chase National Park | Terrey Hills; Belrose |
| North Turramurra; Turramurra | St Ives | Garigal National Park |
| Pymble; Gordon | East Killara; Gordon | East Killara |

St Ives is a suburb on the Upper North Shore of Sydney in the state of New South Wales, Australia 18 kilometres north of the Sydney Central Business District in the local government area of Ku-ring-gai Council. St Ives Chase is a separate adjacent area, designated suburb, to the west and north.

== History ==
The St Ives area was first explored by Governor Arthur Phillip and a party of men in 1788 where they set up a campsite at Bungaroo which is close to what is now Hunter Avenue. The area produced a small-scale timber felling industry. There are still some examples of the thirty-metre and higher trees in nearby Pymble in the Dalrymple-Hay Nature Reserve and near Canisius College. Native turpentine trees were also once abundant and provided useful timber for cabinet making. It was once known for its apple orchards, but due to residential demand, there is no longer any commercial fruit growing in the area. During the Second World War, there were significant numbers of troops barracked in the area, which provided the impetus to build Archbold Road as a supplementary and emergency route to the city. Since 1950 the suburb has expanded from the central shopping areas and the arterial main roads to include hilltop and valley areas bordering on the surrounding Ku-ring-gai Chase National Park to the north, now the area known as St Ives Chase, and Garigal National Park to the east and the south-east.

St Ives Post Office opened on 10 November 1885 and the first public school opened on 6 May 1889. The school was formally opened by John Burns, MLA on Saturday 8 June. After inspecting the "neat and well-designed school and teacher's residence" the party had a luncheon to mark the occasion.

St Ives was initially slow to develop due to the perceived remoteness from the city. Settlement increased in the late 1890s, when St Ives was populated by market gardeners, a small dairy, orchard workers and related industries. The suburb since the end of the Second World War has seen its most rapid period of expansion and a steady growth in families moving to the area.

Nowadays, St Ives is recognised in the Greater Sydney Region as a relatively safe and wealthy suburb. According to the 2021 Australian Federal Census, St Ives has a median weekly household income of $2,888, well above the state average of $1,829.

== Commercial area ==
The St Ives Shopping Village is a medium-sized shopping centre that opened in the 1960s. In the 1970s, it became the main commercial area for St Ives and now features over 100 stores. The centre includes multiple supermarkets, with major tenants such as Harris Farm Markets, Coles, and Woolworths. The shopping village is situated across from the Village Green and a skate park, providing a convenient location for both shopping and recreation. The centre has over 110 stores, its main tenants are Harris Farm Markets, Coles and Woolworths.

The Village Green is a popular park in St Ives. Village Green is directly opposite of St Ives Shopping Village (on the northern side of the premises). The park is bordered by three streets: Memorial Avenue, Village Green Parade and Cowan Road. The park includes sporting fields, baseball fields, tennis courts and a skate park. Furthermore, the Village Green hosts the annual Festival on the Green.

In May 2025, St Ives Shopping Village was bought out by developer Sam Arnaout for $450 million.

== Transport ==
CDC NSW operates five bus routes through St Ives

- 195: Gordon to St Ives Chase via Pymble
- 196: Gordon to Mona Vale
- 197: Macquarie University to Mona Vale via West Pymble, Gordon, Pymble, Belrose, Terrey Hills and Ingleside
- 591 to Hornsby station
- 594: City Clarence Street to North Turramurra via Roseville, Lindfield and Killara
- St Ives is bisected by Mona Vale Road (running east/west) which provides direct access to either Mona Vale on the coast, or Ryde to the west.

== Schools ==
- Sydney Grammar School (St Ives Campus) (K–6)
- St Ives Public School (K–6)
- St Ives Park Public School (K–6)
- St Ives North Public School (K–6)
- St Ives High School (7–12)
- Corpus Christi Catholic Primary School (K–6)
- Brigidine College (7–12)
- Masada College (P–12)
- Handprints St Ives Pre School and Child Care
- St Ives Prepare Early Education 0-6 years old

== Sport and recreation ==
- St Ives Rugby Club, who play at Hassell Park or 'Fortress Hassall'.
- Northern Wildcats Girls Rugby Club, who play at Hassell Park.
- St Ives Wahroonga Cricket Club, who play at Hassall Park.
- Pymble Golf Club, Cowan Road, St Ives.
- St Ives Soccer Club, who play at Warrimoo Oval, St Ives Chase.
- St Ives Saints Australian Football Club (Australian rules football), who play at Acron Oval.
- Northside Monash Soccer Club, who play at Mimosa Oval.
- North St Ives Scouts whose hall lies adjacent to Warrimoo Oval, St Ives Chase.
- 2nd St Ives Scouts whose hall is adjacent to Barra Brui Oval, off Hunter Ave.
- St Ives Radio Control Car Club, racing at St Ives Showgrounds.
- Dalrymple-Hay Nature Reserve is situated on the east side of Mona Vale Road and covers 10.7 hectares. It consists of a blackbutt open forest and is used as a recreation area by locals, in spite of having problems with weeds and die-back. It is listed on the Register of the National Estate.
- St Ives Netball Club.
- St Ives Softball Club, who play at St Ives Village Green.
- St Ives Bowling Club who play on the bowling greens located opposite the St Ives Village Green.
- Ku-ring-gai Wildflower Garden is a 123 hectare botanic garden located on the north side of Mona Vale Road. It includes a visitor centre, a Senses Track and extensive walking tracks.

== Population ==
At the 2021 census, St Ives recorded a population of 18,384. Of these:

- The median age was 43 years. Children aged 0 – 14 years made up 20.8% of the population and people aged 65 years and over made up 19.7% of the population.
- 51.8% of people were born in Australia. The most common other countries of birth were South Africa 8.6%, China 7.1%, England 6.3%, Hong Kong 2.0% and New Zealand 2.0%.
- The most common ancestries were English 23.9%, Australian 15.9%, Chinese 11.9%, Irish 6.3% and Scottish 6.2%.
- 69.0% of people only spoke English at home. Other languages spoken at home included Mandarin 8.7%, Cantonese 3.7%, Korean 2.4%, Persian 1.7% and Spanish 0.9%.
- The most common responses for religion were No Religion 28.6%, Anglican 17.6%, Catholic 17.3% and Judaism 9.7%.
- 82.9% of households were family households, and 16.2% were single-person households.

Of occupied private dwellings in St Ives, 70.1% were separate houses, 20.2% were flats or apartments and 9.5% were semi-detached.

=== Notable residents ===
- Craig Bennett, showbiz reporter, TV presenter, journalist/author
- Megan Connolly, actress
- Andrew Denton, television presenter
- Paula Duncan, actress
- Slim Dusty, singer-songwriter, guitarist
- Sue Fear OAM, first Australian woman to climb Mount Everest
- Andy Harper, football (soccer) commentator
- Jim Jefferies, comedian
- Adam Kellerman, a paralympic wheelchair tennis player
- Georgie Parker, television personality
- Mitchell Pearce, rugby league player
- Wayne Pearce, former Rugby league great
- Kimberley Starr, novelist
- Karl Stefanovic, television presenter
- Basil van Rooyen, former South-African F1 racecar driver
