= Bobbin Head, New South Wales =

Place in New South Wales, Australia

Coordinates: 33°39′36″S 151°09′33″E

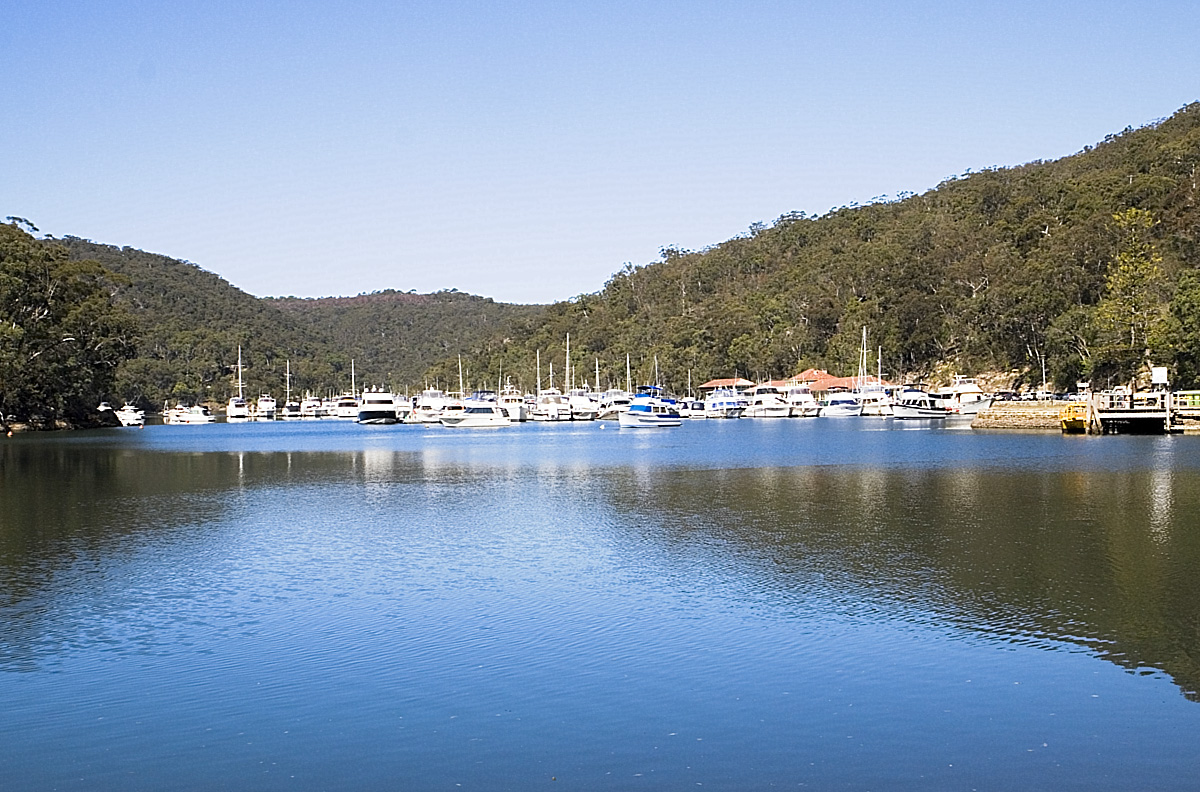
View of the marina at Bobbin Head

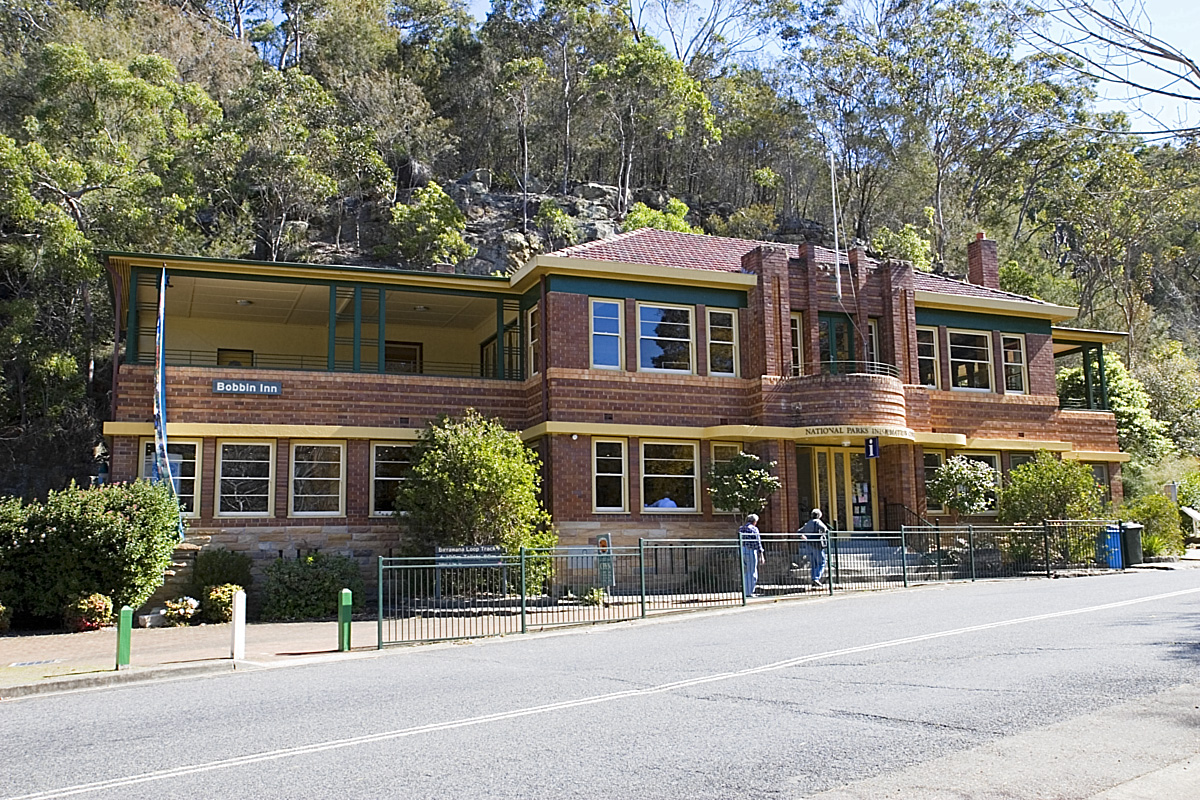
The Bobbin Inn building

Bobbin Head is a point on Cowan Creek in the north of the suburb of North Turramurra, New South Wales, Australia. It is a "near-urban" part of Ku-ring-gai Chase National Park. Bobbin Head is easily reached by taking Bobbin Head Road through North Turramurra or Kuringai Chase Road, Mount Colah near Hornsby.

== Facilities ==
Facilities at Bobbin Head include a marina, picnic areas with gas barbecues, a licensed restaurant and kiosk at the marina, small boat hire at the marina, and a lunch-time restaurant in what used to be the Bobbin Head Inn, which also contains a National Parks information centre.

=== Trails ===
The area also contains many fire trails and a mangrove boardwalk. Aboriginal engravings can be observed along some of the bushwalk trails. There is also a discovery trail along the waterfront inside the marina that chronicles the history of the area.

== History ==
The Bobbin Inn was built by the Ku-ring-gai Chase Trust in 1936. The inn was officially opened by Bertram Stevens, Premier of New South Wales, on 5 March 1937.
