= Sexton Blake bibliography part 3: 1946–1978 =

List of cases featuring Fictional British detective Sexton Blake

Sexton Blake Bibliography 1946–1978
- Author: Jack Trevor Story; Michael Moorcock; John Creasey; John G. Brandon; Anthony Parsons
- Country: United Kingdom
- Language: English
- Genre: Detective fiction
- Publisher: Amalgamated Press; Fleetway Publications; Howard Baker Books; Mirror Books
- Media type: Story paper Comic strips

Sexton Blake is a fictional detective who has been featured in many British comic strips, novels, and dramatic productions since 1893. He was featured in various British publications from 1893 to 1978 in a variety of formats: single-issue adventures, short stories, serials, and comic strips. In total, Blake appeared in more than 4,000 stories by over 200 different authors.

During its golden age (1920s–1940s), Blake's adventures were widely read and translated into at least twenty different languages, including Swedish, Norwegian, Finnish, Dutch, Spanish, German, Portuguese, Italian, French, Arabic, Hindi, and Afrikaans.

== Publication history ==
The first Sexton Blake story was "The Missing Millionaire". Written by Harry Blyth (using the pseudonym Hal Meredeth), it was published in The Halfpenny Marvel number 6, on 20 December 1893, a story paper owned by the Amalgamated Press. Blyth wrote six more Sexton Blake tales, three for the Marvel and three for The Union Jack a story paper launched in April 1894.

The Amalgamated Press purchased the copyright to Blake along with the first story Blyth had submitted and from 1895 onwards several authors began to pen Blake tales. From August 1905 Blake became the resident character in The Union Jack, appearing in every issue until its transformation into the Detective Weekly in 1933.

Blake's popularity began to grow during the Edwardian era, and he appeared in a number of different story papers. These appearances included serials in the tabloid sized Boys' Friend, complete tales in the pocket-sized Penny Pictorial, and short stores in Answers, one of the Amalgamated Press' most popular papers. Longer tales of 60,000 words or so appeared in The Boys' Friend Library and the success of these led to the creation of The Sexton Blake Library in 1915. This digest-sized publication specialized in longer tales, and at the height of its popularity was published 5 times a month. It ran for just under 50 years.

In 1959 Amalgamated Press was renamed Fleetway Publications, which continued with Sexton Blake adventures and published The Sexton Blake Library until the title's demise. The final tale, The Last Tiger, was published in June 1963.

In 1965, Blake editor William Howard Baker licensed the rights of the Sexton Blake character. He published the fifth series of The Sexton Blake Library independently via Mayflower-Dell Books, which ran until 1968. He then issued a final series of four Sexton Blake novels, using his Howard Baker Books imprint, in 1969. From 1968 to 1971 Valiant published new comic strips in the style of the Knockout strips from decades earlier. Blake's last original appearance was in Sexton Blake and the Demon God "a period thriller with ancient curses and cliff-hanger endings" in 1978.

There were a few anthologies and reprints in the 80s and 90s. In 2009 Wordsworth Books published the casebook of Sexton Blake and Snowbooks published Sexton Blake Detective. 2018 saw an uptick in Sexton Blake reprints, with the first print novels published by Stillwoods Publishing, a Canadian publisher out of Nova Scotia. In 2020 ROH Press began publishing Sexton Blake tales with Sexton Blake The Early Years, a collection of Blake's first cases. British publishers Rebellion Publishing produced four anthologies in 2020–2021, each introduced by Blakeologist Mark Hodder.

== Compiling the Sexton Blake bibliography ==
The bibliography originated in the pages of Story Paper Collectors' Digest where collectors began recording and compiling the list of Blake tales that appeared in The Union Jack and The Sexton Blake Library. A master corpus was assembled in the late 1950s by The Sexton Blake Circle to facilitate the research of the Blake story papers.

Titles and authorship were verified from the archived records of the Amalgamated Press. As many of authors published in The Union Jack before 1929 were uncredited, the Sexton Blake Circle adopted the practice of accrediting authorship to the person who received payment for the tale until proven otherwise. Led by Len and Josie Packman expansion and revision on the master corpus was ongoing throughout the early 1960s as research brought more titles to light.

The Sexton Blake Catalogue was published in 1966. The announcement in Story Paper Collectors' Digest read:

This long anticipated catalogue, prepared with loving care by members of the Sexton Blake Circle, is now awaiting you. It is a veritable encyclopaedia of Sexton Blake lore, listing all the titles, authors, and leading characters of the stories in The Union Jack and in The Sexton Blake Library from the very beginning till the present day. There is also a wealth of information on the Sexton Blake adventures which featured in other periodicals. Beautifully produced, it sums up to a magnificent job.

In 1970 Josie Packman announced a reprint of the Sexton Blake Catalogue along with a "supplement of all the new information."

In July 1971 its completion and availability was announced in the Collector's Digest with the following announcement:

FOR ALL SEXTON BLAKE FANS
The Supplement to the Sexton Blake Catalogue is now ready, containing all the information which was not to hand at the time the main Catalogue was first published. It contains all the titles in the most recent series of the Sexton Blake Library; information concerning all the Blake serials of years gone by; particulars of Blake as seen in stage plays and on the talking screen; titles of Blake stories in the rare Penny Pictorial and in Answers Library, plus information concerning the pre-war Sexton Blake Annuals.

Since publication the Catalogue and supplement have been considered an "invaluable" tool by researchers interested in the Blake canon. As Blake research was ongoing as new information or titles were discovered in primary sources, the catalogue was updated.

The catalogue provided verification that Sexton Blake had appeared in roughly 4000 tales by around 200 authors. Based on this statistic, Otto Penzler and Chris Steinbrunner writing in the Encyclopedia of Mystery and Detection, concluded that Sexton Blake was "the hero of more novels and stories than any other detective."

In 1993 the second edition of the "famous Sexton Blake Catalogue" was announced in honour of the detective's 100th birthday. The announcement read:

With over 120 pages of text and illustrations listing all the known appearances of the world's greatest detective in print, TV, radio and celluloid, this bibliography is a must for all collectors.

It was issued by The Sexton Blake Library of the London Old Boys' Book Club.

Additions to the catalogue since 1993 have been made from publisher and retailer websites. ISBN numbers, where applicable, have been added to assist verification.

== The Sexton Blake bibliography parts 1 to 4 ==
Due to the extreme length of the bibliography it has been divided into four eras:

1893–1911: The Victorian/Edwardian Era Sexton Blake bibliography
1912–1945: The Master Criminals Era Sexton Blake bibliography part 2: 1912–1945
1946–1978: The Post War Era Sexton Blake bibliography part 3: 1946–1978
1979–present: Revivals and Republications: Sexton Blake bibliography part 4: 1979–present

== Notes to the cases ==
All authors have been listed and linked to their Wikipedia biographies where possible. Many of these authors are remembered nowadays for the adversaries they pitted against Blake or the femme fatales they introduced. Many of these popular characters and their appearances have been described and included as well as key incidents in the life of Sexton Blake.

== 1946 ==
Publication	Title	Author	Key Characters	Notes
Knock-Out Comic 358 (strip)	The Strange Affair of Dr X (part 15)	Anon. (Clarke/Taylor)		
Knock-Out Comic 359 (strip)	The Strange Affair of Dr X (part 16)	Anon. (Clarke/Taylor)		
Knock-Out Comic 360 (strip)	The Strange Affair of Dr X (part 17)	non. (Clarke/Taylor)		
Knock-Out Comic 361 (strip)	The Strange Affair of Dr X (part 18)	Anon. (Clarke/Taylor)		
Knock-Out Comic 362 (strip)	The Strange Affair of Dr X (part 19)	Anon. (Clarke/Taylor)		
Knockout Comic 363 (strip)	Sexton Blake and the Case of the Emerald Eye (part 1)	Anon. (Clarke/Taylor)		
Knockout Comic 364 (strip)	Sexton Blake and the Case of the Emerald Eye (part 2)	Anon. (Clarke/Taylor)		
Knockout Comic 365 (strip)	Sexton Blake and the Case of the Emerald Eye (part 3)	Anon. (Clarke/Taylor)		
Knockout Comic 366 (strip)	Sexton Blake and the Case of the Emerald Eye (part 4)	Anon. (Clarke/Taylor)		
Knockout Comic 367 (strip)	Sexton Blake and the Case of the Emerald Eye (part 5)	Anon. (Clarke/Taylor)		
Knockout Comic 368 (strip)	Sexton Blake and the Case of the Emerald Eye (part 6)	Anon. (Clarke/Taylor)		
Knockout Comic 369 (strip)	Sexton Blake and the Case of the Emerald Eye (part 7)	Anon. (Clarke/Taylor)		
Knockout Comic 370 (strip)	Sexton Blake and the Case of the Emerald Eye (part 8)	Anon. (Clarke/Taylor)		
Knockout Comic 371 (strip)	Sexton Blake and the Case of the Emerald Eye (part 9)	Anon. (Clarke/Taylor)		
Knockout Comic 372 (strip)	Sexton Blake and the Case of the Emerald Eye (part 10)	Anon. (Clarke/Taylor)		
Knockout Comic 373 (strip)	Sexton Blake and the Case of the Emerald Eye (part 11)	Anon. (Clarke/Taylor)		
Knockout Comic 374 (strip)	Sexton Blake and the Case of the Emerald Eye (part 11)	Anon. (Clarke/Taylor)		
Knockout Comic 375 (strip)	Sexton Blake and the Case of the Emerald Eye (part 12)	Anon. (Clarke/Taylor)		
Knockout Comic 376 (strip)	Sexton Blake and the Case of the Emerald Eye (part 13)	Anon. (Clarke/Taylor)		
Knockout Comic 377 (strip)	Sexton Blake and the Case of the Emerald Eye (part 14)	Anon. (Clarke/Taylor)		
Knockout Comic 378 (strip)	Sexton Blake and the Atom Eggs (part 1)	Anon. (Clarke/Taylor)		
Knockout Comic 379 (strip)	Sexton Blake and the Atom Eggs (part 2)	Anon. (Clarke/Taylor)		
Knockout Comic 380 (strip)	Sexton Blake and the Atom Eggs (part 3)	Anon. (Clarke/Taylor)		
Knockout Comic 381 (strip)	Sexton Blake and the Atom Eggs (part 4)	Anon. (Clarke/Taylor)		
Knockout Comic 382 (strip)	Sexton Blake and the Atom Eggs (part 5)	Anon. (Clarke/Taylor)		
Knockout Comic 383 (strip)	Sexton Blake and the Atom Eggs (part 6)	Anon. (Clarke/Taylor)		
Knockout Comic 384 (strip)	Sexton Blake and the Atom Eggs (part 7)	Anon. (Clarke/Taylor)		
Knockout Comic 385 (strip)	Sexton Blake and the Atom Eggs (part 8)	Anon. (Clarke/Taylor)		
Knockout Comic 386 (strip)	Sexton Blake and the Atom Eggs (part 9)	Anon. (Clarke/Taylor)		
Knockout Comic 387 (strip)	Sexton Blake and the Atom Eggs (part 10)	Anon. (Clarke/Taylor)		
Knockout Comic 388 (strip)	Sexton Blake and the Atom Eggs (part 11)	Anon. (Clarke/Taylor)		
Knockout Comic 389 (strip)	Sexton Blake and the Atom Eggs (part 12)	Anon. (Clarke/Taylor)		
Knockout Comic 390 (strip)	Sexton Blake and the Atom Eggs (part 13)	Anon. (Clarke/Taylor)		
Knockout Comic 391 (strip)	Sexton Blake and the Atom Eggs (part 14)	Anon. (Clarke/Taylor)		
Knockout Comic 392 (strip)	Sexton Blake and the Atom Eggs (part 15)	Anon. (Clarke/Taylor)		
Knockout Comic 393 (strip)	Sexton Blake and the Atom Eggs (part 16)	Anon. (Clarke/Taylor)		
Knockout Comic 394 (strip)	Sexton Blake and the Atom Eggs (part 17)	Anon. (Clarke/Taylor)		
Knockout Comic 395 (strip)	Sexton Blake and the Atom Eggs (part 18)	Anon. (Clarke/Taylor)		
Knockout Comic 396 (strip)	Sexton Blake and the Atom Eggs (part 19)	Anon. (Clarke/Taylor)		
Knockout Comic 397 (strip)	Sexton Blake and the Atom Eggs (part 20)	Anon. (Clarke/Taylor)		
Knockout Comic 398 (strip)	Sexton Blake and the Case of the Flying Peril (part 1)	Anon. (Clarke/Taylor)		
Knockout Comic 399 (strip)	Sexton Blake and the Case of the Flying Peril (part 2)	Anon. (Clarke/Taylor)		
Knockout Comic 400 (strip)	Sexton Blake and the Case of the Flying Peril (part 3)	Anon. (Clarke/Taylor)		
Knockout Comic 401 (strip)	Sexton Blake and the Case of the Flying Peril (part 4)	Anon. (Clarke/Taylor)		
Knockout Comic 402 (strip)	Sexton Blake and the Case of the Flying Peril (part 5)	Anon. (Clarke/Taylor)		
Knockout Comic 403 (strip)	Sexton Blake and the Case of the Flying Peril (part 6)	Anon. (Clarke/Taylor)		
Knockout Comic 404 (strip)	Sexton Blake and the Case of the Flying Peril (part 7)	Anon. (Clarke/Taylor)		
Knockout Comic 405 (strip)	Sexton Blake and the Case of the Flying Peril (part 8)	Anon. (Clarke/Taylor)		
Knockout Comic 406 (strip)	Sexton Blake and the Case of the Flying Peril (part 9)	Anon. (Clarke/Taylor)		
Knockout Comic 407 (strip)	Sexton Blake and the Case of the Flying Peril (part 10)	Anon. (Clarke/Taylor)		
Knockout Comic 408 (strip)	Sexton Blake and the Case of the Flying Peril (part 11)	Anon. (Clarke/Taylor)		
Knockout Comic 409 (strip)	Sexton Blake and the Case of the Flying Peril (part 12)	Anon. (Clarke/Taylor)		
Knockout Fun Book 1946 (strip)	Sexton Blake and the Bronze Key	Anon. (Unknown/Taylor)		
The Sexton Blake Library (3rd Series) 111	The Riddle of the Indian Alibi	Anthony Parsons		
The Sexton Blake Library (3rd Series) 112	Fourteen Years After	John Hunter		
The Sexton Blake Library (3rd Series) 113	The Wimbledon Common Trap	John Hunter		
The Sexton Blake Library (3rd Series) 114	The Tenant of No. 13	Lewis Jackson (Jack Lewis)		
The Sexton Blake Library (3rd Series) 115	The Case of the Prince's Prisoners	Anthony Parsons		
The Sexton Blake Library (3rd Series) 116	The Affair of the Fraternising Soldier	Peter Meriton (John Hunter)		
The Sexton Blake Library (3rd Series) 117	The Mystery of the 250,000 Rupees	Anthony Parsons		
The Sexton Blake Library (3rd Series) 118	The Case of the Defaulting Sailor	John Hunter		
The Sexton Blake Library (3rd Series) 119	The Case of the Fatal Souvenir	Lewis Jackson (Jack Lewis)		
The Sexton Blake Library (3rd Series) 120	The Mystery of the Three Demobbed Men	Walter Tyrer		
The Sexton Blake Library (3rd Series) 121	The Case of the Missing G.I. Bride	Anthony Parsons		
The Sexton Blake Library (3rd Series) 122	Down East	Lewis Jackson (Jack Lewis)		
The Sexton Blake Library (3rd Series) 123	The Red Van Mystery	Gilbert Chester (H. H. C. Gibbons)		
The Sexton Blake Library (3rd Series) 124	The Man Who Had to Quit	Anthony Parsons		
The Sexton Blake Library (3rd Series) 125	The Mystery of Moat Farm	John Hunter		
The Sexton Blake Library (3rd Series) 126	The Case of the Night Lorry Driver	Lewis Jackson (Jack Lewis)		
The Sexton Blake Library (3rd Series) 127	The Case of the Swindler's Stooge	Anthony Parsons		
The Sexton Blake Library (3rd Series) 128	The Mystery of the Double Burglary	Gilbert Chester (H. H. C. Gibbons)		
The Sexton Blake Library (3rd Series) 129	The Woman With a Record	Lewis Jackson (Jack Lewis)		
The Sexton Blake Library (3rd Series) 130	The Man From Chungking	Rex Hardringe		
The Sexton Blake Library (3rd Series) 131	The Crime on the Moors	Walter Tyrer		
The Sexton Blake Library (3rd Series) 132	The Mystery of the Bankrupt Estate	Anthony Parsons		
The Sexton Blake Library (3rd Series) 133	The Case of Lord Greyburn's Son	Derek Long		
The Sexton Blake Library (3rd Series) 134	The Yank Who Came Back	Anthony Parsons		

== 1947 ==
Publication	Title	Author	Key Characters	Notes
Knockout Comic 410 (strip)	Sexton Blake and the Case of the Flying Peril (part 13)	Anon. (Clarke/Taylor)		
Knockout Comic 411 (strip)	Sexton Blake and the Case of the Flying Peril (part 14)	Anon. (Clarke/Taylor)		
Knockout Comic 412 (strip)	Sexton Blake and the Case of the Flying Peril (part 15)	Anon. (Clarke/Taylor)		
Knockout Comic 413 (strip)	Sexton Blake and the Case of the Flying Peril (part 16)	Anon. (Clarke/Taylor)		
Knockout Comic 414 (strip)	Sexton Blake and the Case of the Flying Peril (part 17)	Anon. (Clarke/Taylor)		
Knockout Comic 415 (strip)	Sexton Blake and the Case of the Catseye Rings (part 1)	Anon. (Clarke/Taylor)		
Knockout Comic 416 (strip)	Sexton Blake and the Case of the Catseye Rings (part 2)	Anon. (Clarke/Taylor)		
Knockout Comic 417 (strip)	Sexton Blake and the Case of the Catseye Rings (part 3)	Anon. (Clarke/Taylor)		
Knockout Comic 418 (strip)	Sexton Blake and the Case of the Catseye Rings (part 4)	Anon. (Clarke/Taylor)		
Knockout Comic 419/20/21 (strip)	Sexton Blake and the Case of the Catseye Rings (part 5)	Anon. (Clarke/Taylor)		
Knockout Comic 422 (strip)	Sexton Blake and the Case of the Catseye Rings (part 6)	Anon. (Clarke/Taylor)		
Knockout Comic 423 (strip)	Sexton Blake and the Case of the Catseye Rings (part 7)	Anon. (Clarke/Taylor)		
Knockout Comic 424 (strip)	Sexton Blake and the Case of the Catseye Rings (part 8)	Anon. (Clarke/Taylor)		
Knockout Comic 425 (strip)	Sexton Blake and the Case of the Catseye Rings (part 9)	Anon. (Clarke/Taylor)		
Knockout Comic 426 (strip)	Sexton Blake and the Case of the Catseye Rings (part 10)	Anon. (Clarke/Taylor)		
Knockout Comic 427 (strip)	Sexton Blake and the Case of the Catseye Rings (part 11)	Anon. (Clarke/Taylor)		
Knockout Comic 428 (strip)	Sexton Blake and the Case of the Catseye Rings (part 12)	Anon. (Clarke/Taylor)		
Knockout Comic 429 (strip)	Sexton Blake and the Case of the Catseye Rings (part 13)	Anon. (Clarke/Taylor)		
Knockout Comic 430 (strip)	Sexton Blake & the Case of the Tropical Adventure (part 1)	Anon. (Clarke/Taylor)		
Knockout Comic 431 (strip)	Sexton Blake & the Case of the Tropical Adventure (part 2)	Anon. (Clarke/Taylor)		
Knockout Comic 432 (strip)	Sexton Blake & the Case of the Tropical Adventure (part 3)	Anon. (Clarke/Taylor)		
Knockout Comic 433 (strip)	Sexton Blake & the Case of the Tropical Adventure (part 4)	Anon. (Clarke/Taylor)		
Knockout Comic 434 (strip)	Sexton Blake & the Case of the Tropical Adventure (part 5)	Anon. (Clarke/Taylor)		
Knockout Comic 435 (strip)	Sexton Blake & the Case of the Tropical Adventure (part 6)	Anon. (Clarke/Taylor)		
Knockout Comic 436 (strip)	Sexton Blake & the Case of the Tropical Adventure (part 7)	Anon. (Clarke/Taylor)		
Knockout Comic 437 (strip)	Sexton Blake & the Case of the Tropical Adventure (part 8)	Anon. (Clarke/Taylor)		
Knockout Comic 438 (strip)	Sexton Blake & the Case of the Tropical Adventure (part 9)	Anon. (Clarke/Taylor)		
Knockout Comic 439 (strip)	Sexton Blake & the Case of the Tropical Adventure (part 10)	Anon. (Clarke/Taylor)		
Knockout Comic 440 (strip)	Sexton Blake & the Case of the Tropical Adventure (part 11)	Anon. (Clarke/Taylor)		
Knockout Comic 441 (strip)	The Adventure of the Four Buddhas (part 1)	Anon. (Clarke/Taylor)		
Knockout Comic 442 (strip)	The Adventure of the Four Buddhas (part 2)	Anon. (Clarke/Taylor)		
Knockout Comic 443 (strip)	The Adventure of the Four Buddhas (part 3)	Anon. (Clarke/Taylor)		
Knockout Comic 444 (strip)	The Adventure of the Four Buddhas (part 4)	Anon. (Clarke/Taylor)		
Knockout Comic 445 (strip)	The Adventure of the Four Buddhas (part 5)	Anon. (Clarke/Taylor)		
Knockout Comic 446 (strip)	The Adventure of the Four Buddhas (part 6)	Anon. (Clarke/Taylor)		
Knockout Comic 447 (strip)	The Adventure of the Four Buddhas (part 7)	Anon. (Clarke/Taylor)		
Knockout Comic 448 (strip)	The Adventure of the Four Buddhas (part 8)	Anon. (Clarke/Taylor)		
Knockout Comic 449 (strip)	The Adventure of the Four Buddhas (part 9)	Anon. (Clarke/Taylor)		
Knockout Comic 450 (strip)	The Adventure of the Four Buddhas (part 10)	Anon. (Clarke/Taylor)		
Knockout Comic 451 (strip)	The Adventure of the Four Buddhas (part 11)	Anon. (Clarke/Taylor)		
Knockout Comic 452 (strip)	The Adventure of the Four Buddhas (part 12)	Anon. (Clarke/Taylor)		
Knockout Comic 453 (strip)	The Adventure of the Four Buddhas (part 13)	Anon. (Clarke/Taylor)		
Knockout Comic 454 (strip)	The Adventure of the Four Buddhas (part 14)	Anon. (Clarke/Taylor)		
Knockout Comic 455 (strip)	The Adventure of the Four Buddhas (part 15)	Anon. (Clarke/Taylor)		
Knockout Comic 456 (strip)	The Adventure of the Four Buddhas (part 16)	Anon. (Clarke/Taylor)		
Knockout Comic 457 (strip)	The Adventure of the Four Buddhas (part 17)	Anon. (Clarke/Taylor)		
Knockout Comic 458 (strip)	The Great Pine City Mystery (part 1)	Anon. (Clarke/Taylor)		
Knockout Comic 459 (strip)	The Great Pine City Mystery (part 2)	Anon. (Clarke/Taylor)		
Knockout Comic 460 (strip)	The Great Pine City Mystery (part 3)	Anon. (Clarke/Taylor)		
Knockout Comic 461 (strip)	The Great Pine City Mystery (part 4)	Anon. (Clarke/Taylor)		
Knockout Fun Book 1947	The Man Who Kidnapped Father Christmas	Anon. (Unknown/Taylor)		
The Sexton Blake Library (3rd Series) 135	A Date With Danger	Gilbert Chester (H. H. C. Gibbons)		
The Sexton Blake Library (3rd Series) 136	The Crime on the Cliff	Lewis Jackson (Jack Lewis)		
The Sexton Blake Library (3rd Series) 137	The Secret of the Veld	Rex Hardringe		
The Sexton Blake Library (3rd Series) 138	The Riddle of the Escaped P.O.W.	Anthony Parsons		
The Sexton Blake Library (3rd Series) 139	According to Plan	Lewis Jackson (Jack Lewis)		
The Sexton Blake Library (3rd Series) 140	The Case of the Double Event	John Hunter		
The Sexton Blake Library (3rd Series) 141	The Affair of the Missing Parachutist	Anthony Parsons		
The Sexton Blake Library (3rd Series) 142	The Case of the Chinese Courier	Rex Hardinge		
The Sexton Blake Library (3rd Series) 143	The Riddle of the Smiling Man	John Hunter		
The Sexton Blake Library (3rd Series) 144	The Mystery of the Crashed Air-Liner	Gilbert Chester (H. H. C. Gibbons)		
The Sexton Blake Library (3rd Series) 145	The Man From Kenya	Anthony Parsons		
The Sexton Blake Library (3rd Series) 146	The Riddle of the Film Star's Jewels	Lewis Jackson (Jack Lewis)		
The Sexton Blake Library (3rd Series) 147	The Yellow Terror	Rex Hardinge		
The Sexton Blake Library (3rd Series) 148	The Euston Road Mystery	Anthony Parsons		
The Sexton Blake Library (3rd Series) 149	Warned off!	John Hunter		
The Sexton Blake Library (3rd Series) 150	The Holiday Camp Mystery	Walter Tyrer		
The Sexton Blake Library (3rd Series) 151	The Riddle of the Burmese Curse	Anthony Parsons		
The Sexton Blake Library (3rd Series) 152	The Case of the Fighting Padre	Lewis Jackson (Jack Lewis)		
The Sexton Blake Library (3rd Series) 153	The Man Who Lost His Memory	Anthony Skene (George N. Philips)		
The Sexton Blake Library (3rd Series) 154	The Secret of the Jungle	Rex Hardinge		
The Sexton Blake Library (3rd Series) 155	The Night of the 23rd	Lewis Jackson (Jack Lewis)		
The Sexton Blake Library (3rd Series) 156	The Great Currency Racket	Gilbert Chester (H. H. C. Gibbons)		
The Sexton Blake Library (3rd Series) 157	The Men from Mongolia	Rex Hardinge		
The Sexton Blake Library (3rd Series) 158	The Mystery of the Whitehall Bomb	Anthony Parsons		

== 1948 ==
Publication	Title	Author	Key Characters	Notes
Knockout Comic 462 (strip)	The Great Pine City Mystery (part 5)	Anon. (Clarke/Taylor)		
Knockout Comic 463 (strip)	The Great Pine City Mystery (part 6)	Anon. (Clarke/Taylor)		
Knockout Comic 464 (strip)	The Great Pine City Mystery (part 7)	Anon. (Clarke/Taylor)		
Knockout Comic 465 (strip)	The Great Pine City Mystery (part 8)	Anon. (Clarke/Taylor)		
Knockout Comic 466 (strip)	The Great Pine City Mystery (part 9)	Anon. (Clarke/Taylor)		
Knockout Comic 467 (strip)	The Great Pine City Mystery (part 10)	Anon. (Clarke/Taylor)		
Knockout Comic 468 (strip)	The Case of the Clothing Robberies (part 1)	Anon. (Clarke/Taylor)		
Knockout Comic 469 (strip)	The Case of the Clothing Robberies (part 2)	Anon. (Clarke/Taylor)		
Knockout Comic 470 (strip)	The Case of the Clothing Robberies (part 3)	Anon. (Clarke/Taylor)		
Knockout Comic 471 (strip)	The Case of the Clothing Robberies (part 4)	Anon. (Clarke/Taylor)		
Knockout Comic 472 (strip)	The Case of the Clothing Robberies (part 5)	Anon. (Clarke/Taylor)		
Knockout Comic 473 (strip)	The Case of the Clothing Robberies (part 6)	Anon. (Clarke/Taylor)		
Knockout Comic 474 (strip)	The Case of the Clothing Robberies (part 7)	Anon. (Clarke/Taylor)		
Knockout Comic 475 (strip)	The Case of the Clothing Robberies (part 8)	Anon. (Clarke/Taylor)		
Knockout Comic 476 (strip)	Sexton Blake and the Case of the Torn Chart (part 1)	Anon. (Clarke/Taylor)		
Knockout Comic 477 (strip)	Sexton Blake and the Case of the Torn Chart (part 2)	Anon. (Clarke/Taylor)		
Knockout Comic 478 (strip)	Sexton Blake and the Case of the Torn Chart (part 3)	Anon. (Clarke/Taylor)		
Knockout Comic 479 (strip)	Sexton Blake and the Case of the Torn Chart (part 4)	Anon. (Clarke/Taylor)		
Knockout Comic 480 (strip)	Sexton Blake and the Case of the Torn Chart (part 5)	Anon. (Clarke/Taylor)		
Knockout Comic 481 (strip)	Sexton Blake and the Case of the Torn Chart (part 6)	Anon. (Clarke/Taylor)		
Knockout Comic 482 (strip)	Sexton Blake and the Case of the Torn Chart (part 7)	Anon. (Clarke/Taylor)		
Knockout Comic 483 (strip)	Sexton Blake and the Case of the Torn Chart (part 8)	Anon. (Clarke/Taylor)		
Knockout Comic 484 (strip)	Sexton Blake and the Case of the Torn Chart (part 9)	Anon. (Clarke/Taylor)		
Knockout Comic 485 (strip)	Sexton Blake and the Case of the Torn Chart (part 10)	Anon. (Clarke/Taylor)		
Knockout Comic 486 (strip)	Sexton Blake and the Case of the Torn Chart (part 11)	Anon. (Clarke/Taylor)		
Knockout Comic 487 (strip)	Sexton Blake and the Case of the Torn Chart (part 12)	Anon. (Clarke/Taylor)		
Knockout Comic 488 (strip)	Sexton Blake and the Case of the Torn Chart (part 13)	Anon. (Clarke/Taylor)		
Knockout Comic 489 (strip)	Sexton Blake and the Case of the Torn Chart (part 14)	Anon. (Clarke/Taylor)		
Knockout Comic 490 (strip)	The Secret of Castle Craig (part 1)	Anon. (Clarke/Taylor)		
Knockout Comic 491 (strip)	The Secret of Castle Craig (part 2)	Anon. (Clarke/Taylor)		
Knockout Comic 492 (strip)	The Secret of Castle Craig (part 3)	Anon. (Clarke/Taylor)		
Knockout Comic 493 (strip)	The Secret of Castle Craig (part 4)	Anon. (Clarke/Taylor)		
Knockout Comic 494 (strip)	The Secret of Castle Craig (part 5)	Anon. (Clarke/Taylor)		
Knockout Comic 495 (strip)	The Secret of Castle Craig (part 6)	Anon. (Clarke/Taylor)		
Knockout Comic 496 (strip)	The Secret of Castle Craig (part 7)	Anon. (Clarke/Taylor)		
Knockout Comic 497 (strip)	The Secret of Castle Craig (part 8)	Anon. (Clarke/Taylor)		
Knockout Comic 498 (strip)	The Secret of Castle Craig (part 9)	Anon. (Clarke/Taylor)		
Knockout Comic 499 (strip)	The Secret of Castle Craig (part 10)	Anon. (Clarke/Taylor)		
Knockout Comic 500 (strip)	The Secret of Castle Craig (part 11)	Anon. (Clarke/Taylor)		
Knockout Comic 501 (strip)	The Secret of Castle Craig (part 12)	Anon. (Clarke/Taylor)		
Knockout Comic 502 (strip)	Sexton Blake Versus Solo (part 1)	Anon. (Clarke/Taylor)		
Knockout Comic 503 (strip)	Sexton Blake Versus Solo (part 2)	Anon. (Clarke/Taylor)		
Knockout Comic 504 (strip)	Sexton Blake Versus Solo (part 3)	Anon. (Clarke/Taylor)		
Knockout Comic 505 (strip)	Sexton Blake Versus Solo (part 4)	Anon. (Clarke/Taylor)		
Knockout Comic 506 (strip)	Sexton Blake Versus Solo (part 5)	Anon. (Clarke/Taylor)		
Knockout Comic 507 (strip)	Sexton Blake Versus Solo (part 6)	Anon. (Clarke/Taylor)		
Knockout Comic 508 (strip)	Sexton Blake Versus Solo (part 7)	Anon. (Clarke/Taylor)		
Knockout Comic 509 (strip)	Sexton Blake Versus Solo (part 8)	Anon. (Clarke/Taylor)		
Knockout Comic 510 (strip)	Sexton Blake Versus Solo (part 9)	Anon. (Clarke/Taylor)		
Knockout Comic 511 (strip)	Sexton Blake Versus Solo (part 10)	Anon. (Clarke/Taylor)		
Knockout 512 (strip)	Sexton Blake Versus Solo (part 11)	Anon. (Clarke/Taylor)		
Knockout 513 (strip)	Sexton Blake Versus Solo (part 12)	Anon. (Clarke/Taylor)		
Knockout Fun Book 1948	Sexton Blake and the Radio Wizard	Anon. (Unknown/Taylor)		
The Sexton Blake Library (3rd Series) 159	The Case of the Doped Heavyweight	Lewis Jackson (Jack Lewis)		
The Sexton Blake Library (3rd Series) 160	The Gargoyle of Polgelly	Rex Hardinge		
The Sexton Blake Library (3rd Series) 161	The Income-Tax Conspiracy	Anthony Parsons		
The Sexton Blake Library (3rd Series) 162	The Case Against Dr Ripon	Walter Tyrer		
The Sexton Blake Library (3rd Series) 163	The Mystery of the Shadowed Footballer	Martin Frazer (Percy A. Clarke)		
The Sexton Blake Library (3rd Series) 164	The Loot of Pakistan	Anthony Parsons		
The Sexton Blake Library (3rd Series) 165	The Case of the Stolen Mine	Rex Hardinge		
The Sexton Blake Library (3rd Series) 166	The Curse of the Track	John Hunter		
The Sexton Blake Library (3rd Series) 167	The Mystery of the Red Cockatoo	Anthony Parsons		
The Sexton Blake Library (3rd Series) 168	The Man Who Went Wrong	Lewis Jackson (Jack Lewis)		
The Sexton Blake Library (3rd Series) 169	The Mystery of the Deserted Camp	John Drummond (J. N. Chance)		
The Sexton Blake Library (3rd Series) 170	The Affair of the Spiv's Secret	John Hunter		
The Sexton Blake Library (3rd Series) 171	The Man Who Backed Out	Anthony Parsons		
The Sexton Blake Library (3rd Series) 172	The Case of the African Emigrant	Rex Hardinge		
The Sexton Blake Library (3rd Series) 173	The Motor-Coach Mystery	Walter Tyrer		
The Sexton Blake Library (3rd Series) 174	The Secret of the African Settler	Rex Hardinge		
The Sexton Blake Library (3rd Series) 175	The Mystery of the One-Day Alibi	Anthony Parsons		
The Sexton Blake Library (3rd Series) 176	The Riddle of the Sealed Room	Rex Hardinge		
The Sexton Blake Library (3rd Series) 177	The Riddle of the Russian Bride	Anthony Parsons		
The Sexton Blake Library (3rd Series) 178	The Case of the American Tourists	John Hunter		
The Sexton Blake Library (3rd Series) 179	The Man from Algiers	Warwick Jardine (Francis Warwick)		
The Sexton Blake Library (3rd Series) 180	The Mystery of Avenue Road	Anthony Parsons		
The Sexton Blake Library (3rd Series) 181	The Riddle of the Highwayman's Stone	Rex Hardinge		
The Sexton Blake Library (3rd Series) 182	The Town of Shadows	John Drummond (J. N. Chance)		

== 1949 ==
Publication	Title	Author	Key Characters	Notes
Knockout 514 (strip)	Sexton Blake Versus Solo (part 13)	Anon. (Clarke/Taylor)		
Knockout 515 (strip)	The Secret of Monte Cristo (part 1)	Anon. (Holmes/Parker)		
Knockout 516 (strip)	The Secret of Monte Cristo (part 2)	Anon. (Holmes/Parker)		
Knockout 517 (strip)	The Secret of Monte Cristo (part 3)	Anon. (Holmes/Parker)		
Knockout 518 (strip)	The Secret of Monte Cristo (part 4)	Anon. (Holmes/Parker)		
Knockout 519 (strip)	The Secret of Monte Cristo (part 5)	Anon. (Holmes/Parker)		
Knockout 520 (strip)	The Secret of Monte Cristo (part 6)	Anon. (Holmes/Parker)		
Knockout 521 (strip)	The Secret of Monte Cristo (part 7)	Anon. (Holmes/Parker)		
Knockout 522 (strip)	The Secret of Monte Cristo (part 8)	Anon. (Holmes/Parker)		
Knockout 523 (strip)	The Secret of Monte Cristo (part 9)	Anon. (Holmes/Parker)		
Knockout 524 (strip)	The Secret of Monte Cristo (part 10)	Anon. (Holmes/Parker)		
Knockout 525 (strip)	The Secret of Monte Cristo (part 11)	Anon. (Holmes/Parker)		
Knockout 526 (strip)	The Secret of Monte Cristo (part 12)	Anon. (Holmes/Parker)		
Knockout 527 (strip)	The Secret of Monte Cristo (part 13)	Anon. (Holmes/Parker)		
Knockout 528 (strip)	The Secret of Monte Cristo (part 14)	Anon. (Holmes/Parker)		
Knockout 529 (strip)	Sexton Blake and Tinker Versus Plague of Crime (part 1)	Anon. (Matthews/Heade)		
Knockout 530 (strip)	Sexton Blake Versus the Astounding John Plague (part 2)	Anon. (Matthews/Heade)		
Knockout 531 (strip)	Sexton Blake Versus the Astounding John Plague (part 3)	Anon. (Matthews/Heade)		
Knockout 532 (strip)	Sexton Blake Versus the Astounding John Plague (part 4)	Anon. (Matthews/Heade)		
Knockout 533 (strip)	Sexton Blake Versus the Astounding John Plague (part 5)	Anon. (Matthews/Heade)		
Knockout 534 (strip)	Sexton Blake Versus the Astounding John Plague (part 6)	Anon. (Matthews/Heade)		
Knockout 535 (strip)	Sexton Blake Versus the Astounding John Plague (part 7)	Anon. (Matthews/Heade)		
Knockout 536 (strip)	Sexton Blake Versus the Astounding John Plague (part 8)	Anon. (Matthews/Heade)		
Knockout 537 (strip)	The Strange Case of the Plastic Bullet (part 1)	Anon. (Holmes/Grandfield)		
Knockout 538 (strip)	The Strange Case of the Plastic Bullet (part 2)	Anon. (Holmes/Grandfield)		
Knockout 539 (strip)	The Strange Case of the Plastic Bullet (part 3)	Anon. (Holmes/Grandfield)		
Knockout 540 (strip)	The Strange Case of the Plastic Bullet (part 4)	Anon. (Holmes/Grandfield)		
Knockout 541 (strip)	The Strange Case of the Plastic Bullet (part 5)	Anon. (Holmes/Grandfield)		
Knockout 542 (strip)	Sexton Blake and the River Gang (part 1)	Anon. (Holmes/MacGillivray)		
Knockout 543 (strip)	Sexton Blake and the River Gang (part 2)	Anon. (Holmes/MacGillivray)		
Knockout 544 (strip)	Sexton Blake and the River Gang (part 3)	Anon. (Holmes/MacGillivray)		
Knockout 545 (strip)	Sexton Blake and the River Gang (part 4)	Anon. (Holmes/MacGillivray)		
Knockout 546 (strip)	Sexton Blake and the River Gang (part 5)	Anon. (Holmes/MacGillivray)		
Knockout 547 (strip)	Sexton Blake and the River Gang (part 6)	Anon. (Holmes/MacGillivray)		
Knockout 548 (strip)	Sexton Blake and the Phantom Cavalier (part 1)	Anon. (Holmes/MacGillivray)		
Knockout 549 (strip)	Sexton Blake and the Phantom Cavalier (part 2)	Anon. (Holmes/MacGillivray)		
Knockout 550 (strip)	Sexton Blake and the Phantom Cavalier (part 3)	Anon. (Holmes/MacGillivray)		
Knockout 551 (strip)	Sexton Blake and the Phantom Cavalier (part 4)	Anon. (Holmes/MacGillivray)		
Knockout 552 (strip)	Sexton Blake and the Phantom Cavalier (part 5)	Anon. (Holmes/MacGillivray)		
Knockout 553 (strip)	Sexton Blake and the Phantom Cavalier (part 6)	Anon. (Holmes/MacGillivray)		
Knockout 554 (strip)	Sexton Blake and the Phantom Cavalier (part 7)	Anon. (Holmes/MacGillivray)		
Knockout 555 (strip)	Sexton Blake and the Phantom Cavalier (part 8)	Anon. (Holmes/MacGillivray)		
Knockout 556 (strip)	Sexton Blake and the Gold of Sheba (part 1)	Anon. (Holmes/MacGillivray)		
Knockout 557 (strip)	Sexton Blake and the Gold of Sheba (part 2)	Anon. (Holmes/MacGillivray)		
Knockout 558 (strip)	Sexton Blake and the Gold of Sheba (part 3)	Anon. (Holmes/MacGillivray)		
Knockout 559 (strip)	Sexton Blake and the Gold of Sheba (part 4)	Anon. (Holmes/MacGillivray)		
Knockout 560 (strip)	Sexton Blake and the Gold of Sheba (part 5)	Anon. (Holmes/MacGillivray)		
Knockout 561 (strip)	Sexton Blake and the Gold of Sheba (part 6)	Anon. (Holmes/MacGillivray)		
Knockout 562 (strip)	Sexton Blake and the Gold of Sheba (part 7)	Anon. (Holmes/MacGillivray)		
Knockout 563 (strip)	Sexton Blake and the Red Rapier (part 1)	Anon. (Higgins/Davies)		
Knockout 564 (strip)	Sexton Blake and the Red Rapier (part 2)	Anon. (Higgins/Davies)		
Knockout 565 (strip)	Sexton Blake and the Red Rapier (part 3)	Anon. (Higgins/Davies)		
Knockout 566 (strip)	Sexton Blake and the Red Rapier (part 4)	Anon. (Higgins/Davies)		
Knockout Fun Book 1949 (strip)	Sexton Blake and the Secret of the Atlantic	Anon. (Unknown/Taylor)		
The Sexton Blake Library (3rd Series) 183	The Mystery of the Woman Overboard	Walter Tyrer		
The Sexton Blake Library (3rd Series) 184	Terror at Treetops	Anthony Parsons		
The Sexton Blake Library (3rd Series) 185	The Riddle of the Night Garage	Gilbert Chester (H. H. C. Gibbons)		
The Sexton Blake Library (3rd Series) 186	The Case of the African Trader	Rex Hardinge		
The Sexton Blake Library (3rd Series) 187	The Secret of the Living Skeleton	John Drummond (J. N. Chance)		
The Sexton Blake Library (3rd Series) 188	The Hollywood Contract	Walter Tyrer		
The Sexton Blake Library (3rd Series) 189	The Case of the Dangra Millions	Anthony Parsons		
The Sexton Blake Library (3rd Series) 190	The Riddle of the Receiver's Hoarde	John Drummond (J. N. Chance)		
The Sexton Blake Library (3rd Series) 191	The Death of Miss Preedy	Lewis Jackson (Jack Lewis)		
The Sexton Blake Library (3rd Series) 192	The Mystery of the Devil Mask	Rex Hardinge		
The Sexton Blake Library (3rd Series) 193	The Case of the Missing Surgeon	Anthony Parsons		
The Sexton Blake Library (3rd Series) 194	The Tragedy of the Bromleighs	Rex Hardinge		
The Sexton Blake Library (3rd Series) 195	The Case of the Discharged Policeman	Lewis Jackson (Jack Lewis)		
The Sexton Blake Library (3rd Series) 196	The South Coast Mystery	John Drummond (J. N. Chance)		
The Sexton Blake Library (3rd Series) 197	The Mystery of the Missing Angler	Walter Tyrer		
The Sexton Blake Library (3rd Series) 198	The Riddle of the Rajah's Curios	Anthony Parsons		
The Sexton Blake Library (3rd Series) 199	The Legacy of Hate	Rex Hardinge		
The Sexton Blake Library (3rd Series) 200	The Case of the Dead Spy	John Drummond (J. N. Chance)		
The Sexton Blake Library (3rd Series) 201	The Case of the Secret Agent	Rex Hardinge		
The Sexton Blake Library (3rd Series) 202	One of Eleven	Walter Tyrer		
The Sexton Blake Library (3rd Series) 203	The Man from China	Anthony Parsons		
The Sexton Blake Library (3rd Series) 204	The Madman of the Marshes	Warwick Jardine (Francis Warwick)		
The Sexton Blake Library (3rd Series) 205	The Case of the Crime Reporter	Rex Hardinge		
The Sexton Blake Library (3rd Series) 206	The Man Who Left Home	Lewis Jackson (Jack Lewis)		

== 1950 ==
Publication	Title	Author	Key Characters	Notes
Knockout 567 (strip)	Sexton Blake and the Red Rapier (part 5)	Anon. (Higgins/Davies)		
Knockout 568 (strip)	Sexton Blake and the Red Rapier (part 6)	Anon. (Higgins/Davies)		
Knockout 569 (strip)	Sexton Blake and the Red Rapier (part 7)	Anon. (Higgins/Davies)		
Knockout 570 (strip)	Sexton Blake and the Red Rapier (part 8)	Anon. (Higgins/Davies)		
Knockout 571 (strip)	Sexton Blake and the Red Rapier (part 9)	Anon. (Higgins/Davies)		
Knockout 572 (strip)	Sexton Blake and the Red Rapier (part 10)	Anon. (Higgins/Davies)		
Knockout 573 (strip)	Sexton Blake and the Plane Wreckers (part 1)	Anon. (Unknown/Dodd)		
Knockout 574 (strip)	Sexton Blake and the Plane Wreckers (part 2)	Anon. (Unknown/Dodd)		
Knockout 575 (strip)	Sexton Blake and the Plane Wreckers (part 3)	Anon. (Unknown/Dodd)		
Knockout 576 (strip)	Sexton Blake and the Plane Wreckers (part 4)	Anon. (Unknown/Dodd)		
Knockout 581 (strip)	Sexton Blake — Mountie (part 1)	Anon. (Unknown/MacGillivray)		
Knockout 582 (strip)	Sexton Blake — Mountie (part 2)	Anon. (Unknown/MacGillivray)		
Knockout 583 (strip)	Sexton Blake — Mountie (part 3)	Anon. (Unknown/MacGillivray)		
Knockout 584 (strip)	Sexton Blake — Mountie (part 4)	Anon. (Unknown/MacGillivray)		
Knockout 585 (strip)	Sexton Blake — Mountie (part 5)	Anon. (Unknown/MacGillivray)		
Knockout 586 (strip)	Sexton Blake — Mountie (part 6)	Anon. (Unknown/MacGillivray)		
Knockout 587 (strip)	Sexton Blake and the Railway Raiders (part 1)	Anon. (Higgins/Davies)		
Knockout 588 (strip)	Sexton Blake and the Railway Raiders (part 2)	Anon. (Higgins/Davies)		
Knockout 589 (strip)	Sexton Blake and the Railway Raiders (part 3)	Anon. (Higgins/Davies)		
Knockout 590 (strip)	Sexton Blake and the Railway Raiders (part 4)	Anon. (Higgins/Davies)		
Knockout 591 (strip)	Sexton Blake and the Railway Raiders (part 5)	Anon. (Higgins/Davies)		
Knockout 592 (strip)	Sexton Blake and the Railway Raiders (part 6)	Anon. (Higgins/Davies)		
Knockout 593 (strip)	Sexton Blake and the Railway Raiders (part 7)	Anon. (Higgins/Davies)		
Knockout 594 (strip)	Sexton Blake and the Railway Raiders (part 8)	Anon. (Higgins/Davies)		
Knockout 595 (strip)	Sexton Blake and the Railway Raiders (part 9)	Anon. (Higgins/Davies)		
Knockout 601 (strip)	Sexton Blake and the Kidnapped Speedman (part 1)	Anon. (Higgins/Davies)		
Knockout 602 (strip)	Sexton Blake and the Kidnapped Speedman (part 2)	Anon. (Higgins/Davies)		
Knockout 603 (strip)	Sexton Blake and the Kidnapped Speedman (part 3)	Anon. (Higgins/Davies)		
Knockout 604 (strip)	Sexton Blake and the Kidnapped Speedman (part 4)	Anon. (Higgins/Davies)		
Knockout 605 (strip)	Sexton Blake and the Kidnapped Speedman (part 5)	Anon. (Higgins/Davies)		
Knockout 606 (strip)	Sexton Blake and the Kidnapped Speedman (part 6)	Anon. (Higgins/Davies)		
Knockout 607/610 (strip)	Sexton Blake and the Kidnapped Speedman (part 7)	Anon. (Higgins/Davies)		
Knockout 611 (strip)	Sexton Blake and the Kidnapped Speedman (part 8)	Anon. (Higgins/Davies)		
Knockout 612 (strip)	Sexton Blake and the Kidnapped Speedman (part 9)	Anon. (Higgins/Davies)		
Knockout 613 (strip)	Sexton Blake and the Kidnapped Speedman (part 10)	Anon. (Higgins/Davies)		
Knockout 614 (strip)	Sexton Blake and the Kidnapped Speedman (part 11)	Anon. (Higgins/Davies)		
Knockout 615 (strip)	Sexton Blake and the Kidnapped Speedman (part 12)	Anon. (Higgins/Davies)		
Knockout 616/617 (strip)	Sexton Blake and the Hidden Enemy (part 1)	Anon. (Higgins/Davies)		
Knockout 618 (strip)	Sexton Blake and the Hidden Enemy (part 2)	Anon. (Higgins/Davies)		
Knockout Fun Book 1950 (strip)	Sexton Blake and the Case of the Royal Star	Anon. (Unknown/Taylor)		
The Sexton Blake Library (3rd Series) 207	The Riddle of the Prince's Stooge	Anthony Parsons		
The Sexton Blake Library (3rd Series) 208	The Mystery of the Haunted Square	John Drummond (J. N. Chance)		
The Sexton Blake Library (3rd Series) 209	The Secret of Capri	Warwick Jardine (Francis Warwick)		
The Sexton Blake Library (3rd Series) 210	Witness to the Crime	John Hunter		
The Sexton Blake Library (3rd Series) 211	Those on the List	Anthony Parsons		
The Sexton Blake Library (3rd Series) 212	The Case of the Cottage Crime	Walter Tyrer		
The Sexton Blake Library (3rd Series) 213	The Secret of the Sixty Steps	John Drummond (J. N. Chance)		
The Sexton Blake Library (3rd Series) 214	The Mystery of the Forbidden Territory	Rex Hardinge		
The Sexton Blake Library (3rd Series) 215	Living in Fear	Anthony Parsons		
The Sexton Blake Library (3rd Series) 216	The Evil Spell	Walter Tyrer		
The Sexton Blake Library (3rd Series) 217	The Great Dollar Fraud	Anthony Parsons		
The Sexton Blake Library (3rd Series) 218	The Old Man of the Moors	Warwick Jardine (Francis Warwick)		
The Sexton Blake Library (3rd Series) 219	The Case of the Naval Defaulter	Walter Tyrer		
The Sexton Blake Library (3rd Series) 220	With Criminal Intent	Rex Hardinge		
The Sexton Blake Library (3rd Series) 221	The Mystery of the Crooked Gift	Anthony Parsons		
The Sexton Blake Library (3rd Series) 222	The Case of L.A.C. Dickson	John Drummond (J. N. Chance)		
The Sexton Blake Library (3rd Series) 223	When the Jury Disagreed	John Hunter		
The Sexton Blake Library (3rd Series) 224	The Mystery of the Italian Ruins	Derek Long		
The Sexton Blake Library (3rd Series) 225	The Case of the Spiv's Secret	Anthony Parsons		
The Sexton Blake Library (3rd Series) 226	The Affair of Danny the 'Dip'	Walter Tyrer		
The Sexton Blake Library (3rd Series) 227	The Tragedy of Windy Ridge	Rex Hardinge		
The Sexton Blake Library (3rd Series) 228	The House in the Woods	John Drummond (J. N. Chance)		
The Sexton Blake Library (3rd Series) 229	A Case for M.I.5	Warwick Jardine (Francis Warwick)		
The Sexton Blake Library (3rd Series) 230	The Mystery of the Rio Star	Walter Tyrer		

== 1951 ==
Publication	Title	Author	Key Characters	Notes
Knockout 619 (strip)	Sexton Blake and the Hidden Enemy (part 4)	Anon. (Higgins/Davies)		
Knockout 620 (strip)	Sexton Blake and the Hidden Enemy (part 5)	Anon. (Higgins/Davies)		
Knockout 621 (strip)	Sexton Blake and the Hidden Enemy (part 6)	Anon. (Higgins/Davies)		
Knockout 622 (strip)	Sexton Blake and the Hidden Enemy (part 7)	Anon. (Higgins/Davies)		
Knockout 623 (strip)	Sexton Blake and the Hidden Enemy (part 8)	Anon. (Higgins/Davies)		
Knockout 624 (strip)	Sexton Blake and the Hidden Enemy (part 9)	Anon. (Higgins/Davies)		
Knockout 625 (strip)	Sexton Blake and the Hidden Enemy (part 10)	Anon. (Higgins/Davies)		
Knockout 626 (strip)	Sexton Blake and the Hidden Enemy (part 11)	Anon. (Higgins/Davies)		
Knockout 627 (strip)	Sexton Blake and the Hidden Enemy (part 12)	Anon. (Higgins/Davies)		
Knockout 628 (strip)	Sexton Blake and the Hidden Enemy (part 13)	Anon. (Higgins/Davies)		
Knockout 629 (strip)	Sexton Blake and the Hidden Enemy (part 14)	Anon. (Higgins/Davies)		
Knockout 630 (strip)	Sexton Blake and the Hidden Enemy (part 15)	Anon. (Higgins/Davies)		
Knockout 631 (strip)	Sexton Blake and the Hidden Enemy (part 16)	Anon. (Higgins/Davies)		
Knockout 632 (strip)	Sexton Blake and the Golden Scorpion (part 1)	Anon. (Hunt/MacGillivray)		
Knockout 633 (strip)	Sexton Blake and the Golden Scorpion (part 2)	Anon. (Hunt/MacGillivray)		
Knockout 634 (strip)	Sexton Blake and the Golden Scorpion (part 3)	Anon. (Hunt/MacGillivray)		
Knockout 635 (strip)	Sexton Blake and the Golden Scorpion (part 4)	Anon. (Hunt/MacGillivray)		
Knockout 636 (strip)	Sexton Blake and the Golden Scorpion (part 5)	Anon. (Hunt/MacGillivray)		
Knockout 637 (strip)	Sexton Blake and the Golden Scorpion (part 6)	Anon. (Hunt/MacGillivray)		
Knockout 638 (strip)	Sexton Blake and the Golden Scorpion (part 7)	Anon. (Hunt/MacGillivray)		
Knockout 639 (strip)	Sexton Blake and the Golden Scorpion (part 8)	Anon. (Hunt/MacGillivray)		
Knockout 640 (strip)	Sexton Blake and the Golden Scorpion (part 9)	Anon. (Hunt/MacGillivray)		
Knockout 641 (strip)	Sexton Blake and the Golden Scorpion (part 10)	Anon. (Hunt/MacGillivray)		
Knockout 642 (strip)	Sexton Blake and the Golden Scorpion (part 11)	Anon. (Hunt/MacGillivray)		
Knockout 643 (strip)	Sexton Blake and the Golden Scorpion (part 12)	Anon. (Hunt/MacGillivray)		
Knockout 644 (strip)	Sexton Blake and the Golden Scorpion (part 13)	Anon. (Hunt/MacGillivray)		
Knockout 645 (strip)	Sexton Blake and the Deep Sea Invaders (part 1)	Anon. (Higgins/Davies)		
Knockout 646 (strip)	Sexton Blake and the Deep Sea Invaders (part 2)	Anon. (Higgins/Davies)		
Knockout 647 (strip)	Sexton Blake and the Deep Sea Invaders (part 3)	Anon. (Higgins/Davies)		
Knockout 648 (strip)	Sexton Blake and the Deep Sea Invaders (part 4)	Anon. (Higgins/Davies)		
Knockout 649 (strip)	Sexton Blake and the Deep Sea Invaders (part 5)	Anon. (Higgins/Davies)		
Knockout 650 (strip)	Sexton Blake and the Deep Sea Invaders (part 6)	Anon. (Higgins/Davies)		
Knockout 651 (strip)	Sexton Blake and the Deep Sea Invaders (part 7)	Anon. (Higgins/Davies)		
Knockout 652 (strip)	Sexton Blake and the Deep Sea Invaders (part 8)	Anon. (Higgins/Davies)		
Knockout 653 (strip)	Sexton Blake and the Deep Sea Invaders (part 9)	Anon. (Higgins/Davies)		
Knockout 654 (strip)	Sexton Blake and the Deep Sea Invaders (part 10)	Anon. (Higgins/Davies)		
Knockout 655 (strip)	Sexton Blake and the Deep Sea Invaders (part 11)	Anon. (Higgins/Davies)		
Knockout 657 (strip)	Sexton Blake and the Atom Cloud (part 1)	Anon. (Hunt/Davies)		
Knockout 658 (strip)	Sexton Blake and the Atom Cloud (part 2)	Anon. (Hunt/Davies)		
Knockout 659 (strip)	Sexton Blake and the Atom Cloud (part 3)	Anon. (Hunt/Davies)		
Knockout 660 (strip)	Sexton Blake and the Atom Cloud (part 4)	Anon. (Hunt/Davies)		
Knockout 661 (strip)	Sexton Blake and the Atom Cloud (part 5)	Anon. (Hunt/Davies)		
Knockout 662 (strip)	Sexton Blake and the Atom Cloud (part 6)	Anon. (Hunt/Davies)		
Knockout 663 (strip)	Sexton Blake and the Atom Cloud (part 7)	Anon. (Hunt/Davies)		
Knockout 664 (strip)	Sexton Blake and the Atom Cloud (part 8)	Anon. (Hunt/Davies)		
Knockout 665 (strip)	Sexton Blake and the Atom Cloud (part 9)	Anon. (Hunt/Davies)		
Knockout 666 (strip)	Sexton Blake and the Atom Cloud (part 10)	Anon. (Hunt/Davies)		
Knockout 667 (strip)	Sexton Blake and the Stolen Jetplane (part 1)	Anon. (Unknown/Coton)		
Knockout 668 (strip)	Sexton Blake and the Stolen Jetplane (part 2)	Anon. (Unknown/Coton)		
Knockout 669 (strip)	Sexton Blake and the Stolen Jetplane (part 3)	Anon. (Unknown/Coton)		
Knockout 670 (strip)	Sexton Blake and the Stolen Jetplane (part 4)	Anon. (Unknown/Coton)		
Knockout Fun Book 1951 (text)	Sexton Blake's Holiday	Anon. (Unknown)		
The Sexton Blake Library (3rd Series) 231	The Millionaire's Nest-Egg	Anthony Parsons		
The Sexton Blake Library (3rd Series) 232	Partners in Crime	Hilary King (James G. Dickson)		
The Sexton Blake Library (3rd Series) 233	The Mystery of the New Tenant	John Hunter		
The Sexton Blake Library (3rd Series) 234	The Case of the Green Caravan	Rex Hardinge		
The Sexton Blake Library (3rd Series) 235	Retired from the Yard	Anthony Parsons		
The Sexton Blake Library (3rd Series) 236	The Case of the Two Crooked Baronets	Walter Tyrer		
The Sexton Blake Library (3rd Series) 237	On the 11.40 Down	Hilary King (James G. Dickson)		
The Sexton Blake Library (3rd Series) 238	The Mystery of the Blitzed Tower	Anthony Parsons		
The Sexton Blake Library (3rd Series) 239	It Happened in Melgrove Square	John Hunter		
The Sexton Blake Library (3rd Series) 240	Hated by All	John Drummond (J. N. Chance)		
The Sexton Blake Library (3rd Series) 241	The Case of the Indian Dancer	Anthony Parsons		
The Sexton Blake Library (3rd Series) 242	The Headmaster's Secret	Rex Hardinge		
The Sexton Blake Library (3rd Series) 243	The Crimes at Fenton Towers	Walter Tyrer		
The Sexton Blake Library (3rd Series) 244	The Man from Persia	Lewis Jackson (Ladbroke Black)		
The Sexton Blake Library (3rd Series) 245	The Mystery of the Girl in Green	Anthony Parsons		
The Sexton Blake Library (3rd Series) 246	The Case of the Man with No Name	John Drummond (J. N. Chance)		
The Sexton Blake Library (3rd Series) 247	The Case of the Frightened Girl	Rex Hardinge		
The Sexton Blake Library (3rd Series) 248	Top Secret No. 1	Warwick Jardine (Francis Warwick)		
The Sexton Blake Library (3rd Series) 249	The Case of the Crooked Skipper	John Hunter		
The Sexton Blake Library (3rd Series) 250	The Mystery of the Lost Loot	Hilary King (James G. Dickson)		
The Sexton Blake Library (3rd Series) 251	The Bad Man from Cairo	Anthony Parsons		
The Sexton Blake Library (3rd Series) 252	The Secret of the Desert	Rex Hardinge		
The Sexton Blake Library (3rd Series) 253	The Riddle of the Blazing Bungalow	Stephen Blakesley (F. Bond)		
The Sexton Blake Library (3rd Series) 254	The Mystery of the Sabotaged Jet	John Drummond (J. N. Chance)		
THE SUN COMIC 135	Sexton Blake and the Vanished Film-Star	Warwick Jardine (Francis Warwick)		
THE SUN COMIC 136	Sexton Blake and the Frogman's Secret	Warwick Jardine (Francis Warwick)		
THE SUN COMIC 137	Sexton Blake and the Terror of the Jungle	Warwick Jardine (Francis Warwick)		
THE SUN COMIC 138	Sexton Blake and the Unlucky Horseshoe	Warwick Jardine (Francis Warwick)		
THE SUN COMIC 143	Sexton Blake and the Bat-Man	Warwick Jardine (Francis Warwick)		
THE SUN COMIC 144	Sexton Blake and the Man in the Steel Mask	Warwick Jardine (Francis Warwick)		
THE SUN COMIC 145	Sexton Blake and the Gem Gang	Ray Cary (Raymond Pothecary?)		
THE SUN COMIC 146	Sexton Blake and the Stolen Zoo	Ray Cary (Raymond Pothecary?)		
THE SUN COMIC 147	Sexton Blake and the Gold Bandits	Ray Cary (Raymond Pothecary?)		

== 1952 ==
Publication	Title	Author	Key Characters	Notes
Knockout 671 (strip)	Sexton Blake and the Stolen Jetplane (part 5)	Anon. (Unknown/Coton)		
Knockout 672 (strip)	Sexton Blake and the Stolen Jetplane (part 6)	Anon. (Unknown/Coton)		
Knockout 673 (strip)	Sexton Blake Versus Captain Saturn, Pirate (part 1)	Anon. (Lewis/MacGillivray)		
Knockout 674 (strip)	Sexton Blake Versus Captain Saturn, Pirate (part 2)	Anon. (Lewis/MacGillivray)		
Knockout 675 (strip)	Sexton Blake Versus Captain Saturn, Pirate (part 3)	Anon. (Lewis/MacGillivray)		
Knockout 676 (strip)	Sexton Blake Versus Captain Saturn, Pirate (part 4)	Anon. (Lewis/MacGillivray)		
Knockout 677 (strip)	Sexton Blake Versus Captain Saturn, Pirate (part 5)	Anon. (Lewis/MacGillivray)		
Knockout 678 (strip)	Sexton Blake Versus Captain Saturn, Pirate (part 6)	Anon. (Lewis/MacGillivray)		
Knockout 679 (strip)	Sexton Blake Versus Captain Saturn, Pirate (part 7)	Anon. (Lewis/MacGillivray)		
Knockout 680 (strip)	Sexton Blake Versus Captain Saturn, Pirate (part 8)	Anon. (Lewis/MacGillivray)		
Knockout 681 (strip)	Sexton Blake Versus Captain Saturn, Pirate (part 9)	Anon. (Lewis/MacGillivray)		
Knockout 682 (strip)	Sexton Blake Versus Captain Saturn, Pirate (part 10)	Anon. (Lewis/MacGillivray)		
Knockout 683 (strip)	Sexton Blake Versus Captain Saturn, Pirate (part 11)	Anon. (Lewis/MacGillivray)		
Knockout 684 (strip)	Sexton Blake Versus Captain Saturn, Pirate (part 12)	Anon. (Lewis/MacGillivray)		
Knockout 685 (strip)	Sexton Blake and the City of Doom (part 1)	Anon. (Hunt/Coton)		
Knockout 686 (strip)	Sexton Blake and the City of Doom (part 2)	Anon. (Hunt/Coton)		
Knockout 687 (strip)	Sexton Blake and the City of Doom (part 3)	Anon. (Hunt/Coton)		
Knockout 688 (strip)	Sexton Blake and the City of Doom (part 4)	Anon. (Hunt/Coton)		
Knockout 689 (strip)	Sexton Blake and the City of Doom (part 5)	Anon. (Hunt/Coton)		
Knockout 690 (strip)	Sexton Blake and the City of Doom (part 6)	Anon. (Hunt/Coton)		
Knockout 691 (strip)	Sexton Blake and the City of Doom (part 7)	Anon. (Hunt/Coton)		
Knockout 692 (strip)	Sexton Blake and the City of Doom (part 8)	Anon. (Hunt/Coton)		
Knockout 693 (strip)	Sexton Blake and the City of Doom (part 9)	Anon. (Hunt/Coton)		
Knockout 694 (strip)	Sexton Blake and the City of Doom (part 10)	Anon. (Hunt/Coton)		
Knockout 695 (strip)	Sexton Blake and the City of Doom (part 11)	Anon. (Hunt/Coton)		
Knockout 696 (strip)	Sexton Blake and the City of Doom (part 12)	Anon. (Hunt/Coton)		
Knockout 697 (strip)	Sexton Blake and the London River Raiders (part 1)	Anon. (Hunt/Davies)		
Knockout 698 (strip)	Sexton Blake and the London River Raiders (part 2)	Anon. (Hunt/Davies)		
Knockout 699 (strip)	Sexton Blake and the London River Raiders (part 3)	Anon. (Hunt/Davies)		
Knockout 700 (strip)	Sexton Blake and the London River Raiders (part 4)	Anon. (Hunt/Davies)		
Knockout 701 (strip)	Sexton Blake and the London River Raiders (part 5)	Anon. (Hunt/Davies)		
Knockout 702 (strip)	Sexton Blake and the London River Raiders (part 6)	Anon. (Hunt/Davies)		
Knockout 703 (strip)	Sexton Blake and the London River Raiders (part 7)	Anon. (Hunt/Davies)		
Knockout 704 (strip)	Sexton Blake and the London River Raiders (part 8)	Anon. (Hunt/Davies)		
Knockout 705 (strip)	Sexton Blake and the London River Raiders (part 9)	Anon. (Hunt/Davies)		
Knockout 706 (strip)	Sexton Blake and the London River Raiders (part 10)	Anon. (Hunt/Davies)		
Knockout 707 (strip)	Sexton Blake and the London River Raiders (part 11)	Anon. (Hunt/Davies)		
Knockout 708 (strip)	Sexton Blake Versus the King of Diamonds (part 1)	Anon. (Lewis/MacGillivray)		
Knockout 709 (strip)	Sexton Blake Versus the King of Diamonds (part 2)	Anon. (Lewis/MacGillivray)		
Knockout 710 (strip)	Sexton Blake Versus the King of Diamonds (part 3)	Anon. (Lewis/MacGillivray)		
Knockout 711 (strip)	Sexton Blake Versus the King of Diamonds (part 3)	Anon. (Lewis/MacGillivray)		
Knockout 712 (strip)	Sexton Blake Versus the King of Diamonds (part 4)	Anon. (Lewis/MacGillivray)		
Knockout 713 (text)	The Case of the Man from Mars	Anon. (John Newton Chance)		
Knockout 714 (text)	The Case of the Explosive Man	Anon. (John Newton Chance)		
Knockout 715 (text)	The Case of the Toymaker's Puzzle	Anon. (John Newton Chance)		
Knockout 716 (text)	The Case of the Missing Mail	Anon. (John Newton Chance)		
Knockout 717 (text)	The Case of the Mystery Car	Anon. (John Newton Chance)		
Knockout 718 (text)	The Case of the Frightened Girl	Anon. (John Newton Chance)		
Knockout 719 (text)	The Case of the Man from the East	Anon. (John Newton Chance)		
Knockout 720 (text)	The Case of the Missing Santa Claus	Anon. (John Newton Chance)		
Knockout 721 (text)	The Case of the Monkey Puzzle	Anon. (John Newton Chance)		
Knockout 722 (text)	The Case of the Abominable Snowman	Anon. (John Newton Chance)		
Knockout Fun Book 1952 (strip)	Sexton Blake and the Loch Kyle Monster	Anon. (Unknown/Unknown)		
The Sexton Blake Library (3rd Series) 255	The Case of the Girl on Remand	John Hunter		
The Sexton Blake Library (3rd Series) 256	The Riddle of the Crooked Gambler	Rex Hardinge		
The Sexton Blake Library (3rd Series) 257	The Case of the Missing Scientist	Anthony Parsons		
The Sexton Blake Library (3rd Series) 258	The Dilemma of Doctor Hiley	Walter Tyrer		
The Sexton Blake Library (3rd Series) 259	The Spiv's Mistake	John Hunter		
The Sexton Blake Library (3rd Series) 260	The Man Without a Passport	Anthony Parsons		
The Sexton Blake Library (3rd Series) 261	The Man with a Grievance	Warwick Jardine (Francis Warwick)		
The Sexton Blake Library (3rd Series) 262	The Blackmailed Prince	Anthony Parsons		
The Sexton Blake Library (3rd Series) 263	The Case of the Doped Favourite	John Hunter		
The Sexton Blake Library (3rd Series) 264	The Hire Purchase Fraud	Walter Tyrer		
The Sexton Blake Library (3rd Series) 265	The Man from Space	Rex Hardinge		
The Sexton Blake Library (3rd Series) 266	The House on the River	John Drummond (J. N. Chance)		
The Sexton Blake Library (3rd Series) 267	The Case of the Banned Film	Anthony Parsons		
The Sexton Blake Library (3rd Series) 268	The Man from Dieppe	Hilary King (James G. Dickson)		
The Sexton Blake Library (3rd Series) 269	The Victim of the Crooked Hypnotist	John Hunter		
The Sexton Blake Library (3rd Series) 270	The Case of the Dope Dealers	Martin Frazer (Percy A. Clarke)		
The Sexton Blake Library (3rd Series) 271	The Japanese Contract	Anthony Parsons		
The Sexton Blake Library (3rd Series) 272	The Scrap Metal Mystery	Walter Tyrer		
The Sexton Blake Library (3rd Series) 273	The Prisoner of the Manor	Rex Hardinge		
The Sexton Blake Library (3rd Series) 274	The Trail of Raider No. 1	Stephen Blakesley (F. Bond)		
The Sexton Blake Library (3rd Series) 275	Calling Whitehall 1212	Hugh Clevely		
The Sexton Blake Library (3rd Series) 276	The Case of the Bogus Baron	Walter Tyrer		
The Sexton Blake Library (3rd Series) 277	The Mystery of the Mason's Arms	Anthony Parsons		
The Sexton Blake Library (3rd Series) 278	The Man with a Number	Stephen Blakesley (F. Bond)		

== 1953 ==
Publication	Title	Author	Key Characters	Notes
Knockout 723 (text)	The Case of the Frightened Tramp	Anon. (John Newton Chance)		
Knockout 724 (text)	The Case of the Monster of the Flood	Anon. (John Newton Chance)		
Knockout 725 (text)	The Case of the Mechanical Man	Anon. (John Newton Chance)		
Knockout 726 (text)	The Case of the Flying Spy	Anon. (John Newton Chance)		
Knockout 727 (text)	The Case of the Missing Passenger	Anon. (John Newton Chance)		
Knockout 728 (text)	Sexton Blake and the Haunted Signalman	Anon. (John Newton Chance)		
Knockout 729 (text)	The Mystery of the Moon Rocket	Anon. (John Newton Chance)		
Knockout 730 (text)	The Mystery of the Mist Phantom	Anon. (John Newton Chance)		
Knockout 731 (text)	The Case of the Ice Age Monster	Anon. (John Newton Chance)		
Knockout 732 (text)	Sexton Blake and the Forgotten Bomb	Anon. (John Newton Chance)		
Knockout 733 (text)	The Mystery of the Black Abbott	Anon. (John Newton Chance)		
Knockout 734 (text)	The Case of the Invisible Burglar	Anon. (John Newton Chance)		
Knockout 735 (text)	The Case of the Crooked Clown	Anon. (John Newton Chance)		
Knockout 736 (text)	The Secret of the Haunted House	Anon. (John Newton Chance)		
Knockout 737 (strip)	Sexton Blake and the Bat Man	Anon. (Unknown/MacGillivray)		
Knockout 738 (strip)	Sexton Blake and the Man in the Monster Mask	Anon. (Unknown/MacGillivray)		
Knockout 739 (strip)	Sexton Blake and the Railway Raiders	Anon. (Unknown/MacGillivray)		
Knockout 740 (strip)	Sexton Blake and the Pilotless Plane	Anon. (Unknown/Coton)		
Knockout 741 (strip)	Sexton Blake and the Mountain Mystery	Anon. (Unknown/MacGillivray)		
Knockout 742 (strip)	Sexton Blake and the Ghost of Castle Keep	Anon. (Unknown/MacGillivray)		
Knockout 743 (strip)	Sexton Blake and the Invisible Thief	Anon. (Unknown/Coton)		
Knockout 744 (strip)	Sexton Blake and the Spanish Galleon	Anon. (Unknown/Coton)		
Knockout 745 (strip)	Sexton Blake and the Six Hooded Men	Anon. (Unknown/MacGillivray)		
Knockout 746 (strip)	Sexton Blake and the Secret Weapon Mystery	Anon. (Unknown/Coton)		
Knockout 747 (strip)	Sexton Blake and the Speedway Crime	Anon. (Unknown/Coton)		
Knockout 748 (strip)	Sexton Blake and the Big Fight Mystery	Anon. (Unknown/MacGillivray)		
Knockout 749 (strip)	Sexton Blake and the Flying Kidnappers	Anon. (Unknown/Grange)		
Knockout 750 (strip)	Sexton Blake and the Underground Mystery	Anon. (Unknown/Coton)		
Knockout 751 (strip)	Sexton Blake and the Secret of the Priory	Anon. (Unknown/Grange)		
Knockout 752 (strip)	Sexton Blake and the Highway Mystery	Anon. (Unknown/Coton)		
Knockout 753 (strip)	Sexton Blake and the Circus Mystery	Anon. (Unknown/Club)		
Knockout 754 (strip)	Sexton Blake and the Crooked Speedman	Anon. (Unknown/Coton)		
Knockout 755 (strip)	Sexton Blake and the Funfair Mystery	Anon. (Unknown/Coton)		
Knockout 756 (strip)	Sexton Blake and the Forger's Mistake	Anon. (Unknown/Grange)		
Knockout 757 (strip)	Sexton Blake and the Mystery of Grinley Grange (part 1)	Anon. (Hunt/Partridge)		
Knockout 758 (strip)	Sexton Blake and the Mystery of Grinley Grange (part 2)	Anon. (Hunt/Partridge)		
Knockout 759 (strip)	Sexton Blake and the Mystery of Grinley Grange (part 3)	Anon. (Hunt/Partridge)		
Knockout 760 (strip)	Sexton Blake and the Mystery of Grinley Grange (part 4)	Anon. (Hunt/Partridge)		
Knockout 761 (strip)	Sexton Blake and the Mystery of Grinley Grange (part 5)	Anon. (Hunt/Partridge)		
Knockout 762 (strip)	Sexton Blake and the Mystery of Grinley Grange (part 6)	Anon. (Hunt/Partridge)		
Knockout 763 (strip)	Sexton Blake and the Stolen Pearl	Anon. (Unknown/Taylor)		
Knockout 764 (strip)	Sexton Blake and the King of Diamonds	Anon. (Unknown)		
Knockout 765 (strip)	Sexton Blake and the Football Club Mystery (part 1)	Anon. (Unknown/Higgins)		
Knockout 766 (strip)	Sexton Blake and the Football Club Mystery (part 2)	Anon. (Unknown/Higgins)		
Knockout 767 (strip)	Sexton Blake and the Football Club Mystery (part 3)	Anon. (Unknown/Higgins)		
Knockout 768 (strip)	Sexton Blake and the Football Club Mystery (part 4)	Anon. (Unknown/Higgins)		
Knockout 769 (strip)	Sexton Blake and the Football Club Mystery (part 5)	Anon. (Unknown/Higgins)		
Knockout 770 (strip)	Sexton Blake and the Football Club Mystery (part 6)	Anon. (Unknown/Higgins)		
Knockout 771 (strip)	Sexton Blake and the Football Club Mystery (part 7)	Anon. (Unknown/Higgins)		
Knockout 772 (strip)	The Case of the Twisting Torpedo	Anon. (Unknown/Hamilton)		
Knockout 773 (strip)	The Case of the Seven Suns	Anon. (Unknown/Hamilton)		
Knockout 774 (strip)	The Case of the Christmas Revenge	Anon. (Unknown/Hamilton)		
Knockout Fun Book 1953 (text)	Time Flies!	Quentin Ford (Raymond Pothecary)		
The Sexton Blake Library (3rd Series) 279	The Woman on the Spot	John Hunter		
The Sexton Blake Library (3rd Series) 280	The Big Circus Mystery	Hilary King (James G. Dickson)		
The Sexton Blake Library (3rd Series) 281	Crook's Deputy	Anthony Parsons		
The Sexton Blake Library (3rd Series) 282	The Secret of the Snows	Walter Tyrer		
The Sexton Blake Library (3rd Series) 283	The Case of the African Hoodoo	Rex Hardinge		
The Sexton Blake Library (3rd Series) 284	The Night Club Mystery	Hugh Clevely		
The Sexton Blake Library (3rd Series) 285	The Case of the Prince's Diary	Anthony Parsons		
The Sexton Blake Library (3rd Series) 286	The Secret of the Fated Family	Rex Hardinge		
The Sexton Blake Library (3rd Series) 287	The Naval Stores Racket	Walter Tyrer		
The Sexton Blake Library (3rd Series) 288	The World Championship Mystery	W. J. Passingham		
The Sexton Blake Library (3rd Series) 289	The Case of the Smuggled Currency	Hugh Clevely		
The Sexton Blake Library (3rd Series) 290	The Secret of the Indian Lawyer	Anthony Parsons		
The Sexton Blake Library (3rd Series) 291	The Mystery of the Body on the Cliff	Rex Hardinge		
The Sexton Blake Library (3rd Series) 292	The Crime at the Fair	Hilary King (James G. Dickson)		
The Sexton Blake Library (3rd Series) 293	The Case of the Missing Nazi	Walter Tyrer		
The Sexton Blake Library (3rd Series) 294	Destination Unknown	John Hunter		
The Sexton Blake Library (3rd Series) 295	The Case of the Unknown Heir	Anthony Parsons		
The Sexton Blake Library (3rd Series) 296	The Girl from Toronto	Hugh Clevely		
The Sexton Blake Library (3rd Series) 297	The Mystery of the Arab Agent	Warwick Jardine (Francis Warwick)		
The Sexton Blake Library (3rd Series) 298	The Case of the Ace Accomplice	W. J. Passingham		
The Sexton Blake Library (3rd Series) 299	The Mystery of the Swindler's Stooge	Walter Tyrer		
The Sexton Blake Library (3rd Series) 300	The Case of the Nameless Millionaire	Anthony Parsons		
The Sexton Blake Library (3rd Series) 301	The Thieves of Alexandria	John Hunter		
The Sexton Blake Library (3rd Series) 302	The Secret of the Jungle	George Rees		

== 1954 ==
Publication	Title	Author	Key Characters	Notes
Knockout 775 (strip)	The Case of the New Year Highwayman	Anon. (Unknown/Hamilton)		
Knockout 776 (strip)	The Case of the Lightning Flash	Anon. (Unknown/Hamilton)		
Knockout 777 (strip)	The Case of the Vanishing Tank	Anon. (Unknown/Hamilton)		
Knockout 778 (strip)	The Case of the Museum Robbery	Anon. (Unknown/Hamilton)		
Knockout 779 (strip)	The Case of Rocco Flint	Anon. (Unknown/Hamilton)		
Knockout 780 (strip)	The Case of the Elusive Crook	Anon. (Unknown/Hamilton)		
Knockout 781 (strip)	The Case of the Shattered Village	Anon. (Unknown/Hamilton)		
Knockout 782 (strip)	The Case of the Phantom Hand	Anon. (Unknown/Hamilton)		
Knockout 783 (strip)	The Case of Castle-Wharf!	Anon. (Unknown/Hamilton)		
Knockout 784 (strip)	The Case of the Gorilla Man	Anon. (Unknown/Hamilton)		
Knockout 785 (strip)	The Case of the Night Smuggler	Anon. (Unknown/Hamilton)		
Knockout 786 (strip)	The Case of the TV Plot	Anon. (Unknown/Hamilton)		
Knockout 787 (strip)	The Case of the Dungeon Dummy	Anon. (Unknown/Hamilton)		
Knockout 788 (strip)	The Case of the Gas-Works Gang	Anon. (Unknown/Hamilton)		
Knockout 789 (strip)	The Case of the Scientist's Double	Anon. (Unknown/Hamilton)		
Knockout 790 (strip)	The Case of the Disappearing Diver	Anon. (Unknown/Hamilton)		
Knockout 791 (strip)	The Case of the Phantom Car	Anon. (Unknown/Hamilton)		
Knockout 792 (strip)	The Case of the Man in the Suit-Case	Anon. (Unknown/Hamilton)		
Knockout 793 (strip)	The Case of the Flying Secrets	Anon. (Unknown/Hamilton)		
Knockout 794 (strip)	The Case of the Flying Bats	Anon. (Unknown/Hamilton)		
Knockout 795 (strip)	The Case of the Secret Fighter	Anon. (Unknown/Hamilton)		
Knockout 796 (strip)	The Case of the Yellow Strands	Anon. (Unknown/Hamilton)		
Knockout 797 (strip)	The Case of the Car-Circus Crook	Anon. (Unknown/Hamilton)		
Knockout 798 (strip)	The Case of the Street of Gold	Anon. (Unknown/Hamilton)		
Knockout 799 (strip)	The Case of the Clue in the Book	Anon. (Unknown/Hamilton)		
Knockout 800 (strip)	The Case of the Frightened Professor	Anon. (Unknown/Hamilton)		
Knockout 801 (strip)	The Case of the Phantom Face	Anon. (Unknown/Hamilton)		
Knockout 802 (strip)	The Case of the Man Who Made Gold	Anon. (Unknown/Hamilton)		
Knockout 803 (strip)	The Case of Life and Death	Anon. (Unknown/Hamilton)		
Knockout 804 (strip)	The Case of the Hall of Mirrors	Anon. (Unknown/Hamilton)		
Knockout 805 (strip)	The Case of the Man With Bare Feet	Anon. (Unknown/Hamilton)		
Knockout 806 (strip)	The Case of the Broken Barrel-Organ	Anon. (Unknown/Hamilton)		
Knockout 807 (strip)	The Case of the Chinaman's Face	Anon. (Unknown/Hamilton)		
Knockout 808 (strip)	The Case of the Flooded Village	Anon. (Unknown/Hamilton)		
Knockout 809 (strip)	The Case of the Walking Scarecrow	Anon. (Unknown/Hamilton)		
Knockout 810 (strip)	The Case of the Glass Safe	Anon. (Unknown/Hamilton)		
Knockout 811 (strip)	The Case of the Hermit's Treasure	Anon. (Unknown/Hamilton)		
Knockout 812 (strip)	The Case of the Hungry Messenger	Anon. (Unknown/Hamilton)		
Knockout 813 (strip)	The Case of the Guest at Owl's Nest	Anon. (Unknown/Hamilton)		
Knockout 814 (strip)	The Case of the Clue in the Mirror	Anon. (Unknown/Hamilton)		
Knockout 815 (strip)	The Case of the Falling Dagger	Anon. (Unknown/Hamilton)		
Knockout 816 (strip)	The Case of the Dandy Irishman	Anon. (Unknown/Hamilton)		
Knockout 817 (strip)	The Case of the Red Mark	Anon. (Unknown/Hamilton)		
Knockout 818 (strip)	The Case of the Turbo-Streamliner	Anon. (Unknown/Hamilton)		
Knockout 819 (strip)	The Case of the Shadow Rocket	Anon. (Unknown/Hamilton)		
Knockout 820 (strip)	The Case of the Circle of Moons	Anon. (Unknown/Hamilton)		
Knockout 821 (strip)	The Case of the Third Candle	Anon. (Unknown/Hamilton)		
Knockout 822 (strip)	The Case of the Flame of El Zaro	Anon. (Unknown/Hamilton)		
Knockout 823 (strip)	The Case of the North Road Mystery	Anon. (Unknown/Hamilton)		
Knockout 824 (strip)	The Case of the Lost-Memory Man	Anon. (Unknown/Hamilton)		
Knockout 825 (strip)	The Case of the Christmas Tree Code	Anon. (Unknown/Hamilton)		
Knockout 826 (strip)	The Case of the Christmas Holly	Anon. (Unknown/Hamilton)		
Knockout Fun Book 1954 (strip)	Sexton Blake and the Plane Wreckers	Anon. (Unknown/Unknown)		
The Sexton Blake Library (3rd Series) 303	The Riddle of the French Alibi	Walter Tyrer		
The Sexton Blake Library (3rd Series) 304	The Case of the Three Survivors	Hugh Clevely		
The Sexton Blake Library (3rd Series) 305	The Secret of Sinister Farm	Anthony Parsons		
The Sexton Blake Library (3rd Series) 306	The Lodging House Mystery	Rex Hardinge		
The Sexton Blake Library (3rd Series) 307	The Secret of the Castle Ruins	Anthony Parsons		
The Sexton Blake Library (3rd Series) 308	The Voyage of Fear	Rex Hardinge		
The Sexton Blake Library (3rd Series) 309	The Mystery of the Engraved Skull	Stanton Hope		
The Sexton Blake Library (3rd Series) 310	The Case of the Swindled Guarantor	Walter Tyrer		
The Sexton Blake Library (3rd Series) 311	The Car-Park Mystery	Anthony Parsons		
The Sexton Blake Library (3rd Series) 312	The Crime on the French Frontier	John Hunter		
The Sexton Blake Library (3rd Series) 313	The Heir of Tower House	Hugh Clevely		
The Sexton Blake Library (3rd Series) 314	The Case of the Second Crime	Anthony Parsons		
The Sexton Blake Library (3rd Series) 315	The Riddle of the Invisible Menace	Rex Hardinge		
The Sexton Blake Library (3rd Series) 316	The Mystery of the Five Guilty Men	John Drummond (J. N. Chance)		
The Sexton Blake Library (3rd Series) 317	The Crime at 3.a.m	Hugh Clevely		
The Sexton Blake Library (3rd Series) 318	The Case of the Council Swindle	Walter Tyrer		
The Sexton Blake Library (3rd Series) 319	The Secret of the Moroccan Bazaar	Anthony Parsons		
The Sexton Blake Library (3rd Series) 320	The Case of the Stolen Ransom	John Hunter		
The Sexton Blake Library (3rd Series) 321	The Crime in Room 37	Walter Tyrer		
The Sexton Blake Library (3rd Series) 322	The Case of the Wicked Three	Anthony Parsons		
The Sexton Blake Library (3rd Series) 323	The Case of the Criminal's Daughter	Hugh Clevely		
The Sexton Blake Library (3rd Series) 324	The Secret of the Suez Canal	George Rees		
The Sexton Blake Library (3rd Series) 325	The Victim of the Devil's Bowl	Rex Hardinge		
The Sexton Blake Library (3rd Series) 326	The Man from Maybrick Road	Anthony Parsons		

== 1955 ==
Publication	Title	Author	Key Characters	Notes
Knockout 827 (strip)	The Case of the Witch of Crennan	Anon. (Unknown/Hamilton)		
Knockout 828 (strip)	The Case of the Ghost Express	Anon. (Unknown/Hamilton)		
Knockout 829 (strip)	The Case of the Unknown Listener	Anon. (Unknown/Hamilton)		
Knockout 830 (strip)	The Case of the Robbery By Ice	Anon. (Unknown/Hamilton)		
Knockout 831 (strip)	The Case of the Prison-Breaker	Anon. (Unknown/Hamilton)		
Knockout 832 (strip)	The Case of the Clue in Acid	Anon. (Unknown/Hamilton)		
Knockout 833 (strip)	The Case of the Strong-Room Key	Anon. (Unknown/Hamilton)		
Knockout 834 (strip)	The Case of the Invisible Raider	Anon. (Unknown/Hamilton)		
Knockout 835 (strip)	The Case of the Shop at Six Corners	Anon. (Unknown/Hamilton)		
Knockout 836 (strip)	The Case of the Shuffling Shoes	Anon. (Unknown/Hamilton)		
Knockout 837 (strip)	The Case of the Millionaire Thief	Anon. (Unknown/Hamilton)		
Knockout 838 (strip)	The Case of the Stolen Gold Cup	Anon. (Unknown/Hamilton)		
Knockout 839 (strip)	The Case of the Shattered Windscreen	Anon. (Unknown/Hamilton)		
Knockout 840 (strip)	The Case of the Eye of Iskra	Anon. (Unknown/Hamilton)		
Knockout 841 (strip)	The Case of the Ladder Gang	Anon. (Unknown)		
Knockout 842 (strip)	The Case of the Secret Agent	Anon. (Unknown/Hamilton)		
Knockout 843 (strip)	The Case of Mysto the Mind Reader	Anon. (Unknown/Hamilton)		
Knockout 844 (strip)	The Case of the Telescope Trick	Anon. (Unknown/Hamilton)		
Knockout 845 (strip)	The Case of the Witches Well	Anon. (Unknown/Hamilton)		
Knockout 846 (strip)	The Case of the Peeled Apple	Anon. (Unknown/Hamilton)		
Knockout 847 (strip)	The Case of the Blue Feather	Anon. (Unknown/Hamilton)		
Knockout 848 (strip)	The Case of the Monkey's Fist!	Anon. (Unknown/Hamilton)		
Knockout 849 (strip)	The Case of the Hidden Eye	Anon. (Unknown/Hamilton)		
Knockout 850 (strip)	The Case of the Fire Raiser	Anon. (Unknown/Hamilton)		
Knockout 851 (strip)	The Case of the Museum Monkeys!	Anon. (Unknown/Hamilton)		
Knockout 852 (strip)	The Case of the Train Bandits	Anon. (Unknown/Hamilton)		
Knockout 853 (strip)	The Case of the Yellow Cap Clue	Anon. (Unknown/Pashley)		
Knockout 854 (strip)	The Case of the Secret Alloy	Anon. (Unknown/Pashley)		
Knockout 855 (strip)	The Case of the Dissolving Diamond	Anon. (Unknown/Pashley)		
Knockout 856 (strip)	The Case of the Tinkling Bell	Anon. (Unknown/Pashley)		
Knockout 857 (strip)	The Case of the Missing Train	Anon. (Unknown/Pashley)		
Knockout 858 (strip)	The Case of the Prize Lupins	Anon. (Unknown/Pashley)		
Knockout 859 (strip)	The Case of the Talking Camera	Anon. (Unknown/Pashley)		
Knockout 860 (strip)	The Case of the Loch Monster	Anon. (Unknown/Pashley)		
Knockout 861 (strip)	The Case of the Mystery Man	Anon. (Unknown/Pashley)		
Knockout 862 (strip)	The Case of the Vanishing Patient	Anon. (Unknown/Pashley)		
Knockout 863 (strip)	The Case of the Flying Jellyfish	Anon. (Unknown/Pashley)		
Knockout 864 (strip)	The Case of the Roman Museum	Anon. (Unknown/Pashley)		
Knockout 865 (strip)	The Case of the X-Ray Gang	Anon. (Unknown/Pashley)		
Knockout 866 (strip)	The Case of the Speedbird's Enemy	Anon. (Unknown/Taylor)		
Knockout 867 (strip)	The Case of the Secret Fuel X!	Anon. (Unknown/Pashley)		
Knockout 868 (strip)	The Case of the Limping Man	Anon. (Unknown/Pashley)		
Knockout 869 (strip)	The Case of the Kidnap Clue	Anon. (Unknown/Pashley)		
Knockout 870 (strip)	The Case of the Secret in Sound	Anon. (Unknown/Pashley)		
Knockout 871 (strip)	The Case of the House of Crooks	Anon. (Unknown/Pashley)		
Knockout 872 (strip)	The Case of the Rajah's Gold	Anon. (Unknown/Pashley)		
Knockout 873 (strip)	The Case of the "Golden" Hat Box	Anon. (Unknown/Pashley)		
Knockout 874 (strip)	The Case of the Laughing Man	Anon. (Unknown/Pashley)		
Knockout 875 (strip)	The Case of the Dredger Mystery	Anon. (Unknown/Pashley)		
Knockout 876 (strip)	The Case of the Bank-Note Plot	Anon. (Unknown/Pashley)		
Knockout 877 (strip)	The Case of the Electric Thief	Anon. (Unknown/Pashley)		
Knockout 878 (strip)	The Case of the £1,000 Xmas Tree	Anon. (Unknown/Pashley)		
Knockout 879 (strip)	The Case of the Walking Snowman	Anon. (Unknown/Pashley)		
Knockout Fun Book 1955 (text)	Sexton Blake and the Midnight Mystery	John Drummond (J. N. Chance)		
The Sexton Blake Library (3rd Series) 327	Murder in the Air	John Hunter		
The Sexton Blake Library (3rd Series) 328	The Case of the Forbidden Island	Walter Tyrer		
The Sexton Blake Library (3rd Series) 329	The Case of the Indian Watcher	Anthony Parsons		
The Sexton Blake Library (3rd Series) 330	The Man with Five Enemies	Rex Hardinge		
The Sexton Blake Library (3rd Series) 331	The House of Evil	Hugh Clevely		
The Sexton Blake Library (3rd Series) 332	The Riddle of the Green Cylinder	Warwick Jardine (Francis Warwick)		
The Sexton Blake Library (3rd Series) 333	Prisoner in the Hold	Anthony Parsons		
The Sexton Blake Library (3rd Series) 334	The Teddy-Boy Mystery	John Drummond (J. N. Chance)		
The Sexton Blake Library (3rd Series) 335	The Mystery of the Vanished Trainer	John Hunter		
The Sexton Blake Library (3rd Series) 336	The Case of the Returned Soldier	Walter Tyrer		
The Sexton Blake Library (3rd Series) 337	The Secret of the Roman Temple	Anthony Parsons		
The Sexton Blake Library (3rd Series) 338	The Mystery of the Outlawed Black	Rex Hardinge		
The Sexton Blake Library (3rd Series) 339	The Strange Affair of the Shot-Gun Sniper	Walter Tyrer		
The Sexton Blake Library (3rd Series) 340	The Case of the Six O'Clock Scream	Anthony Parsons		
The Sexton Blake Library (3rd Series) 341	The Trail of the Missing Scientist	Anthony Parsons		
The Sexton Blake Library (3rd Series) 342	The Case of the Two-Faced Swindler	John Drummond (J. N. Chance)		
The Sexton Blake Library (3rd Series) 343	The Mystery of the Mad Millionaires	Walter Tyrer		
The Sexton Blake Library (3rd Series) 344	The Crooks of Tunis	Anthony Parsons		
The Sexton Blake Library (3rd Series) 345	The Strange Affair of the Widow's Diamonds	Hugh Clevely		
The Sexton Blake Library (3rd Series) 346	The Secret of the Man Who Died	Rex Hardinge		
The Sexton Blake Library (3rd Series) 347	Without Warning	W. Howard Baker		
The Sexton Blake Library (3rd Series) 348	The Case of the Frightened Man	Anthony Parsons		
The Sexton Blake Library (3rd Series) 349	The Case of the Legion Deserter	Hugh Clevely		
The Sexton Blake Library (3rd Series) 350	The Man Who Knew Too Much	W. Howard Baker		
SUPER-Detective Library 68	Sexton Blake's Diamond Hunt	Anon. (Unknown)		

== 1956 ==
Publication	Title	Author	Key Characters	Notes
Knockout 880 (strip)	The Case of the Clue in Time	Anon. (Unknown/Western)		
Knockout 881 (strip)	The Case of the Deadly Bus-Ticket	Anon. (Unknown/Pashley)		
Knockout 882 (strip)	The Case of the Prisoner's Alibi	Anon. (Unknown/Pashley)		
Knockout 883 (strip)	The Case of the Seventeen Chimes	Anon. (Unknown/Pashley)		
Knockout 884 (strip)	The Case of the House of Puzzles	Anon. (Unknown/Pashley)		
Knockout 885 (strip)	The Case of Solo Swanson's Mistake	Anon. (Unknown/Pashley)		
Knockout 886 (strip)	The Case of the Three Brothers	Anon. (Unknown/Pashley)		
Knockout 887 (strip)	The Case of the White Tablet	Anon. (Unknown/Pashley)		
Knockout 888/894 (strip)	The Case of the Scattered Papers	Anon. (Unknown/Pashley)		
Knockout 895 (strip)	The Case of the Trail of Coins	Anon. (Unknown/Pashley)		
Knockout 896 (strip)	The Case of the Telephone Clue	Anon. (Unknown/Pashley)		
Knockout 897 (strip)	The Case of the TV Trick	Anon. (Unknown/Pashley)		
Knockout 898 (strip)	The Case of the Loutrec Diamonds	Anon. (Unknown/Pashley)		
Knockout 899 (strip)	The Case of the Pickpocket's Find	Anon. (Unknown/Pashley)		
Knockout 900 (strip)	The Case of the Gleaming Car	Anon. (Unknown/Pashley)		
Knockout 901 (strip)	The Case of the Sports Robbery	Anon. (Unknown/Pashley)		
Knockout 902 (strip)	The Case of the Vanishing Witness	Anon. (Unknown/Pashley)		
Knockout 903 (strip)	The Case of the Black Thumb's Trap	Anon. (Unknown/Pashley)		
Knockout 904 (strip)	The Case of the Climbing Cat	Anon. (Unknown/Pashley)		
Knockout 905 (strip)	The Case of the Flashlight Thief	Anon. (Unknown/Pashley)		
Knockout 906 (strip)	The Case of the Fifth Finger	Anon. (Unknown/Pashley)		
Knockout 907 (strip)	The Case of the Frogman's Haul	Anon. (Unknown/Pashley)		
Knockout 908 (strip)	The Case of the Striker of Matches	Anon. (Unknown/Pashley)		
Knockout 909 (strip)	The Case of the Five Forgeries	Anon. (Unknown/Pashley)		
Knockout 910 (strip)	The Case of the Open Drawer	Anon. (Unknown/Pashley)		
Knockout 911 (strip)	The Case of the East Coach Catch	Anon. (Unknown/Pashley)		
Knockout 912 (strip)	The Case of the Mystery Match	Anon. (Unknown/Pashley)		
Knockout 913 (strip)	The Case of the Golf-Club Clue	Anon. (Unknown/Pashley)		
Knockout 914 (strip)	The Case of the Liner Escape	Anon. (Unknown/Pashley)		
Knockout 915 (strip)	The Case of the Clue in Plaster	Anon. (Unknown/Pashley)		
Knockout 916 (strip)	The Case of the Exploding Rockets	Anon. (Unknown/Pashley)		
Knockout 917 (strip)	The Case of the Broken Bicycle	Anon. (Unknown/Pashley)		
Knockout 918 (strip)	The Case of the Five Fried Eggs	Anon. (Unknown/Pashley)		
Knockout 919 (strip)	The Case of the Quick Change	Anon. (Unknown/Pashley)		
Knockout 920 (strip)	The Case of the £1,000 Match-Box	Anon. (Unknown/Pashley)		
Knockout 921 (strip)	The Case of the Alibi in the Rain	Anon. (Unknown/Pashley)		
Knockout 922 (strip)	The Case of the Smith Street Gang	Anon. (Unknown/Pashley)		
Knockout 923 (strip)	The Case of the Magic Safe	Anon. (Unknown/Unknown)		
Knockout 924 (strip)	The Case of the Missing Light	Anon. (Unknown/Pashley)		
Knockout 925 (strip)	The Case of the Vanishing Visitor	Anon. (Unknown/Pashley)		
Knockout 926 (strip)	The Case of the Smuggler's Mistake	Anon. (Unknown/Unknown)		
Knockout 927 (strip)	The Case of the Strong-Room Plot	Anon. (Unknown/Unknown)		
Knockout 928 (strip)	The Case of the Smash-and-Grab Raid	Anon. (Unknown/Pashley)		
Knockout 929 (strip)	The Case of the Tell-Tale Mark	Anon. (Unknown/Pashley)		
Knockout 930 (strip)	The Case of the Sultan's Star	Anon. (Unknown/Pashley)		
Knockout 931 (strip)	The Case of the Christmas Pearls	Anon. (Unknown/Pashley)		
Knockout Fun Book 1956 (strip)	Sexton Blake and the League of Crime	Anon. (Matthews/Heade)		
The Sexton Blake Library (3rd Series) 351	The Clue of the Pin-Up Girl	Walter Tyrer		
The Sexton Blake Library (3rd Series) 352	It Happened in Hamburg	W. Howard Baker		
The Sexton Blake Library (3rd Series) 353	Danger Ahead	Peter Saxon (W. Howard Baker)		
The Sexton Blake Library (3rd Series) 354	Gangster's Girl	John Hunter		
The Sexton Blake Library (3rd Series) 355	Devil's Can-Can	W. Howard Baker		
The Sexton Blake Library (3rd Series) 356	By Whose Hand?	Rex Hardinge		
The Sexton Blake Library (3rd Series) 357	Hotel Homicide	Anthony Parsons		
The Sexton Blake Library (3rd Series) 358	Decoy for Murder	Peter Saxon (W. Howard Baker)		
The Sexton Blake Library (4th Series) 359	Frightened Lady	W. Howard Baker		
The Sexton Blake Library (4th Series) 360	Flight into Fear	Peter Saxon (W. Howard Baker)		
The Sexton Blake Library (4th Series) 361	Dark Mambo	W. Howard Baker		
The Sexton Blake Library (4th Series) 362	Broken Toy	Arthur Maclean (George P. Mann)		
The Sexton Blake Library (4th Series) 363	Front Page Woman	Peter Saxon (W. Howard Baker)		
The Sexton Blake Library (4th Series) 364	Inclining to Crime	Arthur Kent		
The Sexton Blake Library (4th Series) 365	Night Beat	Arthur Maclean (George Paul Mann)		
The Sexton Blake Library (4th Series) 366	Requiem for Redheads	W. Howard Baker		
The Sexton Blake Library (4th Series) 367	Assignment in Beirut	James Stagg		
The Sexton Blake Library (4th Series) 368	Dark Frontier	Arthur Maclean (George Paul Mann)		
The Sexton Blake Library (4th Series) 369	Woman of Saigon	Peter Saxon (W. Howard Baker)		
The Sexton Blake Library (4th Series) 370	Canvas Jungle	Arthur Maclean (George Paul Mann)		
The Sexton Blake Library (4th Series) 371	Battle Song	W. Howard Baker		
The Sexton Blake Library (4th Series) 372	Murder — With Love!	Jack Trevor Story		

== 1957 ==
Publication	Title	Author	Key Characters	Notes
Knockout 932 (strip)	The Case of the Hidden Treasure	Anon. (Unknown/Pashley)		
Knockout 933 (strip)	The Case of the Uranium-Maker	Anon. (Unknown/Pashley)		
Knockout 934 (strip)	The Case of the Night Watchmen 'Tecs	Anon. (Unknown/Pashley)		
Knockout 935 (strip)	The Case of Panto Pete's Pork Pie	Anon. (Unknown/Pashley)		
Knockout 936 (strip)	The Case of Mazumi's Warning	Anon. (Unknown/Pashley)		
Knockout 937 (strip)	The Case of Midnight Mike's Alibi	Anon. (Unknown/Pashley)		
Knockout 938 (strip)	The Case of the Night Attack	Anon. (Unknown/Pashley)		
Knockout 939 (strip)	The Case of Danny the Dip	Anon. (Unknown/Western)		
Knockout 940 (strip)	The Case of the Stolen Schoolboy	Anon. (Unknown/Pashley)		
Knockout 941 (strip)	The Case of the Scented Forgeries	Anon. (Unknown/Pashley)		
Knockout 942 (strip)	The Case of the Craftsman Crook	Anon. (Unknown/Pashley)		
Knockout 943 (strip)	The Case of the Unlucky Emeralds	Anon. (Unknown/Pashley)		
Knockout 944 (strip)	The Case of the Switched Horses	Anon. (Unknown/Pashley)		
Knockout 945 (strip)	The Case of the April Fool Crook	Anon. (Unknown/Pashley)		
Knockout 946 (strip)	The Case of the Burglary Test	Anon. (Unknown/Pashley)		
Knockout 947 (strip)	The Case of the Easter Plot	Anon. (Unknown/Pashley)		
Knockout 948 (strip)	The Case of the Time-Bomb Plot	Anon. (Unknown/Pashley)		
Knockout 949 (strip)	The Case of Sparkler Kidd's Revenge	Anon. (Unknown/Pashley)		
Knockout 950 (strip)	The Case of the Essex Gypsy	Anon. (Unknown/Pashley)		
Knockout 951 (strip)	The Case of the Man Overboard	Anon. (Unknown/Pashley)		
Knockout 952 (strip)	The Case of the Guarded House	Anon. (Unknown/Pashley)		
Knockout 953 (strip)	The Case of the Big Haul	Anon. (Unknown/Pashley)		
Knockout 954 (strip)	The Case of the Black Pearls	Anon. (Unknown/Pashley)		
Knockout 955 (strip)	The Case of the Overhead Eye	Anon. (Unknown/Pashley)		
Knockout 956 (strip)	The Case of the Bank Blackmailer	Anon. (Unknown/Pashley)		
Knockout 957 (strip)	The Case of the Old Man's Money	Anon. (Unknown/Pashley)		
Knockout 958 (strip)	The Case of the Sea Tiger	Anon. (Unknown/Pashley)		
Knockout 959 (strip)	The Case of the Auction Mystery	Anon. (Unknown/Pashley)		
Knockout 960 (strip)	The Case of the Cowboy Hat	Anon. (Unknown/Pashley)		
Knockout 961 (strip)	The Case of the Tube-Train Mystery	Anon. (Unknown/Pashley)		
Knockout 962 (strip)	The Case of the Too-Slick Crook	Anon. (Unknown/Pashley)		
Knockout 963 (strip)	The Case of the "Lucky" Stones	Anon. (Unknown/Pashley)		
Knockout 964 (strip)	The Case of the Tired Watchman	Anon. (Unknown/Pashley)		
Knockout 965 (strip)	The Case of the Escape Route	Anon. (Unknown/Pashley)		
Knockout 966 (strip)	The Case of the Performing Dogs	Anon. (Unknown/Pashley)		
Knockout 967 (strip)	The Case of the Inside Information	Anon. (Unknown/Pashley)		
Knockout 968 (strip)	The Case of the Gunman Crook	Anon. (Unknown/Pashley)		
Knockout 969 (strip)	The Case of the Etna Emerald	Anon. (Unknown/Pashley)		
Knockout 970 (strip)	The Case of the Old Lady's Pet	Anon. (Unknown/Pashley)		
Knockout 971 (strip)	The Case of the Unridden Bike	Anon. (Unknown/Pashley)		
Knockout 972 (strip)	The Case of the Escaped Convict	Anon. (Unknown/Pashley)		
Knockout 973 (strip)	The Case of the Vital Spark	Anon. (Unknown/Pashley)		
Knockout 974 (strip)	The Case of the Airport Clue	Anon. (Unknown/Pashley)		
Knockout 975 (strip)	The Case of the Shocked Man	Anon. (Unknown/Pashley)		
Knockout 976 (strip)	The Case of the Guy Fawkes Crook	Anon. (Unknown/Pashley)		
Knockout 977 (strip)	The Case of the Wrong Regiment	Anon. (Unknown/Pashley)		
Knockout 978 (strip)	The Case of the Innocent Forger	Anon. (Unknown/Pashley)		
Knockout 979 (strip)	The Case of the 5.10pm Train	Anon. (Unknown/Pashley)		
Knockout 980 (strip)	The Case of the "Golden Hind"	Anon. (Unknown/Pashley)		
Knockout 981 (strip)	The Case of the Secret Hide-Out	Anon. (Unknown/Pashley)		
Knockout 982 (strip)	The Case of the Christmas Money	Anon. (Unknown/Pashley)		
Knockout 983 (strip)	The Case of the Walking Snowman	Anon. (Unknown/Pashley)		
Knockout Annual 1957	The Case of the Kidnapped Athlete (text)	Anon. (Unknown/Pashley)		
Plus:				
The Case of the Cracksman's Alibi (strip)	Anon. (Unknown/Pashley)			
Plus:				
The Case of the Torrelli Twins (strip)	Anon. (Unknown/Taylor)			
The Sexton Blake Library (4th Series) 373	Nightmare in Naples	James Stagg		
The Sexton Blake Library (4th Series) 374	The Season of the Skylark	Jack Trevor Story		
The Sexton Blake Library (4th Series) 375	Silent Witness	John Hunter		
The Sexton Blake Library (4th Series) 376	Mask of Fury	Arthur Maclean (George Paul Mann)		
The Sexton Blake Library (4th Series) 377	Panic in the Night	James Stagg (Jacques Pendower)		
The Sexton Blake Library (4th Series) 378	Homicide Blues	Desmond Reid (G. W. Sowman)		
The Sexton Blake Library (4th Series) 379	Flashpoint for Treason	Desmond Reid (Brian McArdle)		
Plus:				
The Million Pound Stakes	James Stagg			
The Sexton Blake Library (4th Series) 380	Deadline for Danger	Arthur Maclean (George Paul Mann)		
The Sexton Blake Library (4th Series) 381	Special Edition – Murder	Arthur Kent		
The Sexton Blake Library (4th Series) 382	Vacation with Fear	Jack Trevor Story		
The Sexton Blake Library (4th Series) 383	Shoot When Ready	W. Howard Baker		
The Sexton Blake Library (4th Series) 384	Victim Unknown	Desmond Reid (Lee Roberts)		
The Sexton Blake Library (4th Series) 385	Corpse to Copenhagen	Jonathan F. Burke (John Burke)		
The Sexton Blake Library (4th Series) 386	Roadhouse Girl	Desmond Reid (A. L. Martin)		
The Sexton Blake Library (4th Series) 387	Murder with Variety	William Arthur (W. Howard Baker)		
The Sexton Blake Library (4th Series) 388	Act of Violence	Jonathan F. Burke		
The Sexton Blake Library (4th Series) 389	Stand-in for Murder	Desmond Reid (Frank Lambe)		
The Sexton Blake Library (4th Series) 390	Find Me a Killer!	Arthur Maclean (George Paul Mann)		
The Sexton Blake Library (4th Series) 391	Passport to Danger	James Stagg		
The Sexton Blake Library (4th Series) 392	The Copy-Cat Killings	Martin Thomas		
The Sexton Blake Library (4th Series) 393	The Violent Hours	Peter Saxon (W. Howard Baker)		
The Sexton Blake Library (4th Series) 394	The Blonde and the Boodle	Jack Trevor Story		
The Sexton Blake Library (4th Series) 395	The Last Days of Berlin	Peter Saxon (W. Howard Baker)		
The Sexton Blake Library (4th Series) 396	Walk in Fear	W. Howard Baker		

== 1958 ==
Publication	Title	Author	Key Characters	Notes
Knockout 984 (strip)	The Case of the New Year Clown	Anon. (Unknown/Pashley)		
Knockout 985 (strip)	The Case of the Single Thumbprint	Anon. (Unknown/Pashley)		
Knockout 986 (strip)	The Case of the Haunted House	Anon. (Unknown/Pashley)		
Knockout 987 (strip)	The Case of the Man Who Came Back	Anon. (Unknown/Pashley)		
Knockout 988 (strip)	The Case of the Late Alarm Call	Anon. (Unknown/Pashley)		
Knockout 989 (strip)	The Case of the Thin Fat Man	Anon. (Unknown/Pashley)		
Knockout 990 (strip)	The Case of the Robbery at the Arches	Anon. (Unknown/Pashley)		
Knockout 991 (strip)	The Case of the Cut-Out Clue	Anon. (Unknown/Pashley)		
Knockout 992 (strip)	The Case of the £2000 Hair-Cut	Anon. (Unknown/Pashley)		
Knockout 993 (strip)	The Case of the Blue Diamond	Anon. (Unknown/Pashley)		
Knockout 994 (strip)	The Case of the Daring Escape	Anon. (Unknown/Pashley)		
Knockout 995 (strip)	The Case of the Double Picture	Anon. (Unknown/Pashley)		
Knockout 996 (strip)	The Case of the Clue in the Kitchen	Anon. (Unknown/Pashley)		
Knockout 997 (strip)	The Case of the Missing Diamonds	Anon. (Unknown/Pashley)		
Knockout 998 (strip)	The Case of the Island House	Anon. (Unknown/Pashley)		
Knockout 999 (strip)	The Case of the Quick Change Crook	Anon. (Unknown/Pashley)		
Knockout 1,000 (strip)	The Case of the Fight in Cabin 13	Anon. (Unknown/Pashley)		
Knockout 1,001 (strip)	The Case of the Theatre Mystery	Anon. (Unknown/Pashley)		
Knockout 1,002 (strip)	The Case of the High-Heeled Shoes	Anon. (Unknown/Pashley)		
Knockout 1,003 (strip)	The Case of the Robbed Man's Friends	Anon. (Unknown/Pashley)		
Knockout 1,004 (strip)	The Case of the Professor's Plan	Anon. (Unknown/Pashley)		
Knockout 1,005 (strip)	The Case of the Manor Mystery	Anon. (Unknown/Parlett)		
Knockout 1,006 (strip)	The Case of the Missing Footprints	Anon. (Unknown/Pashley)		
Knockout 1,007 (strip)	In the Comic	Anon. (Unknown/Pashley)		
Knockout 1,008 (strip)	The Case of the Crime at Wimbledon	Anon. (Unknown/Pashley)		
Knockout 1,009 (strip)	The Case of the Begging Dogs	Anon. (Unknown/Pashley)		
Knockout 1,010 (strip)	The Case of the Golf-Course Alibi	Anon. (Unknown/Pashley)		
Knockout 1,011 (strip)	The Case of the Jazz-Girl Kidnap	Anon. (Unknown/Pashley)		
Knockout 1,012 (strip)	The Case of the Shot at the Bank	Anon. (Unknown/Pashley)		
Knockout 1,013 (strip)	The Case of the Embankment Ambush	Anon. (Unknown/Unknown)		
Knockout 1,014 (strip)	The Case of the Miracle Diamond	Anon. (Unknown/Pashley)		
Knockout 1,015 (strip)	The Case of the Crooked Cousins	Anon. (Unknown/Pashley)		
Knockout 1,016 (strip)	The Case of the Black Windscreen	Anon. (Unknown/Pashley)		
Knockout 1,017 (strip)	The Case of the Clue in the Bottle	Anon. (Unknown/Pashley)		
Knockout 1,018 (strip)	The Case of the Innocent Crook	Anon. (Unknown/Pashley)		
Knockout 1,019 (strip)	The Case of the Frightened Footballer	Anon. (Unknown/Pashley)		
Knockout 1,020 (strip)	The Case of the Schoolboy's Note	Anon. (Unknown/Pashley)		
Knockout 1,021 (strip)	The Case of the Tell-Tale Tape	Anon. (Unknown/Pashley)		
Knockout 1,022 (strip)	The Case of the Robbed Boxer	Anon. (Unknown/Pashley)		
Knockout 1,023 (strip)	The Case of the Broken Chain	Anon. (Unknown/Pashley)		
Knockout 1,024 (strip)	The Case of the Crashed Car	Anon. (Unknown/Pashley)		
Knockout 1,025 (strip)	The Case of the Ladder Man	Anon. (Unknown/Pashley)		
Knockout 1,026 (strip)	The Case of the Park Prowler	Anon. (Unknown/Pashley)		
Knockout 1,027 (strip)	The Case of the Swimming Smuggler	Anon. (Unknown/Pashley)		
Knockout 1,028 (strip)	The Case of the Faked Robbery	Anon. (Unknown/Pashley)		
Knockout 1,029 (strip)	The Case of the Birthday Theft	Anon. (Unknown/Pashley)		
Knockout 1,030 (strip)	The Case of the Retired Judge	Anon. (Unknown/Pashley)		
Knockout 1,031 (strip)	The Case of the Sunday Bank-Raid	Anon. (Unknown/Pashley)		
Knockout 1,032 (strip)	The Case of the Escape Plan	Anon. (Unknown/Pashley)		
Knockout 1,033 (strip)	The Case of the River Accident	Anon. (Unknown/Pashley)		
Knockout 1,034 (strip)	The Case of the Man With Many Faces	Anon. (Unknown/Pashley)		
Knockout 1,035 (strip)	The Case of the Eight Christmas Trees	Anon. (Unknown/Pashley)		
Knockout Annual 1958 (strip)	The Case of the Crooked Speedman (text)	Anon. (Unknown/Coton)		
Plus:				
The Case of the Underground Mystery (strip)	Anon. (Unknown/Coton)			
Plus:				
The Case of the Flying Emeralds (strip)	Anon. (Unknown/Pashley)			
The Sexton Blake Library (4th Series) 397	Murder Down Below	James Stagg		
The Sexton Blake Library (4th Series) 398	Redhead for Danger	Arthur Maclean (T. C. P. Webb)		
The Sexton Blake Library (4th Series) 399	Stairway to Murder	Arthur Kent		
The Sexton Blake Library (4th Series) 400	The Sea Tigers	Peter Saxon (W. Howard Baker)		
The Sexton Blake Library (4th Series) 401	Collapse of Stout Party	Jack Trevor Story		
The Sexton Blake Library (4th Series) 402	Murder Most Intimate	W. Howard Baker		
The Sexton Blake Library (4th Series) 403	Crime of Violence	James Stagg		
The Sexton Blake Library (4th Series) 404	Lady in Distress	Martin Thomas (Thomas Martin)		
The Sexton Blake Library (4th Series) 405	High Heels and Homicide	Desmond Reid (John Purley)		
The Sexton Blake Library (4th Series) 406	The Fatal Hour	Edwin Harrison (Eric Alan Ballard)		
The Sexton Blake Library (4th Series) 407	Nine O'Clock Shadow	Jack Trevor Story		
The Sexton Blake Library (4th Series) 408	Crime is My Business	W. Howard Baker		
The Sexton Blake Library (4th Series) 409	The Naked Blade	Peter Saxon (W. Howard Baker)		
The Sexton Blake Library (4th Series) 410	Wake Up Screaming!	Arthur Kent		
The Sexton Blake Library (4th Series) 411	Final Curtain	Arthur Maclean (George Paul Mann)		
The Sexton Blake Library (4th Series) 412	Murder in the Sun	Jack Trevor Story		
The Sexton Blake Library (4th Series) 413	No Time to Live	W. Howard Baker		
The Sexton Blake Library (4th Series) 414	Diamonds Can Be Trouble	Edwin Harrison (Eric Alan Ballard)		
The Sexton Blake Library (4th Series) 415	The Evil Eye	Martin Thomas (Thomas Martin)		
The Sexton Blake Library (4th Series) 416	She Ain't Got No Body	Jack Trevor Story		
The Sexton Blake Library (4th Series) 417	The Voodoo Drum	Peter Saxon (W. Howard Baker)		
The Sexton Blake Library (4th Series) 418	The Frightened People	Jack Trevor Story		
Plus:				
No Tears for Belinda	Arthur MacLean			
The Sexton Blake Library (4th Series) 419	The House on the Bay	Arthur Maclean (George Paul Mann)		
Plus:				
No Crime at Christmas	Desmond Reid			
The Sexton Blake Library (4th Series) 420	Appointment with Danger	W. Howard Baker		
Plus:				
A Christmas Party	Anon. (W. Howard Baker)			

== 1959 ==
Publication	Title	Author	Key Characters	Notes
Knockout 1,036 (strip)	The Case of the New Year Plot	Anon. (Unknown/Pashley)		
Knockout 1,037 (strip)	The Case of the Hidden Weapon	Anon. (Unknown/Parlett)		
Knockout 1,038 (strip)	The Case of the Boy Who Didn't Look	Anon. (Unknown/Kennedy)		
Knockout 1,039 (strip)	The Case of the Highway Robbery	Anon. (Unknown/Hamilton)		
Knockout 1,040 (strip)	The Case of the Clue in the Stolen Car	Anon. (Unknown/Parlett)		
Knockout 1,041 (strip)	The Case of the Carrier of Secrets	Anon. (Unknown/Kennedy)		
Knockout 1,042 (strip)	The Case of the Paper Boy's Pencil	Anon. (Unknown/Kennedy)		
Knockout 1,043 (strip)	The Case of the False Alarms	Anon. (Unknown/Kennedy)		
Knockout 1,044 (strip)	The Case of the Clue in the Wreckage	Anon. (Unknown/Kennedy)		
Knockout 1,045 (strip)	The Case of the Angry Traveller	Anon. (Unknown/Kennedy)		
Knockout 1,046 (strip)	The Case of the Innocent Prisoner	Anon. (Unknown/Kennedy)		
Knockout 1,047 (strip)	The Case of the Emperor Diamond	Anon. (Unknown/Kennedy)		
Knockout 1,048 (strip)	The Case of the Ship of the Desert	Anon. (Unknown/Kennedy)		
Knockout 1,049 (strip)	The Case of the Jeweller's Shop Raid	Anon. (Unknown/Parlett)		
Knockout 1,050 (strip)	The Case of the Waiting Policeman	Anon. (Unknown/Kennedy)		
Knockout (strip) 19th Sep	The Case of the Six Marbles	Anon. (Unknown/Kennedy)		
Knockout (strip) 26th Sep	The Case of the Boxing-Ring Crook	Anon. (Unknown/Kennedy)		
Knockout (strip) 3rd Oct	The Case of the Ladder Clue	Anon. (Unknown/Kennedy)		
Knockout (strip) 10th Oct	The Case of the Escape Plan	Anon. (Unknown/Kennedy)		
Knockout (strip) 17th Oct	The Case of the Tell-Tale Colour	Anon. (Unknown/Kennedy)		
Knockout (strip) 24th Oct	The Case of the Painton Diamonds	Anon. (Unknown/Kennedy)		
Knockout (strip) 31st Oct	The Case of the Money in Flames	Anon. (Unknown/Kennedy)		
Knockout (strip) 7th Nov	The Case of the Firework Plot	Anon. (Unknown/Kennedy)		
Knockout (strip) 14th Nov	The Case of the Pirate Ghost	Anon. (Unknown/Kennedy)		
Knockout (strip) 21st Nov	The Case of the Vanishing Secrets	Anon. (Unknown/Kennedy)		
Knockout (strip) 28th Nov	The Case of the Man With Two Razors	Anon. (Unknown/Kennedy)		
Knockout (strip) 5th Dec	The Case of the Clue of the Raffle Ticket	Anon. (Unknown/Kennedy)		
Knockout (strip) 12th Dec	The Case of the Stolen Gordonia	Anon. (Unknown/Kennedy)		
Knockout (strip) 19th Dec	The Case of the Frightened Man	Anon. (Unknown/Kennedy)		
Knockout (strip) 26th Dec	The Case of the Talking Doll	Anon. (Unknown/Kennedy)		
Knockout Annual 1959	The Case of the Runaway Train (strip); The Case of the Vanishing Thief (strip); The Case of the Diamond Smugglers (strip)	Anon. (Unknown/Parlett)		
The Sexton Blake Library (4th Series) 421	A Cry in the Night!	Peter Saxon (W. Howard Baker)		
The Sexton Blake Library (4th Series) 422	Consider Your Verdict	Rex Hardinge		
The Sexton Blake Library (4th Series) 423	Witness to Murder	Edwin Harrison (Eric Alan Ballard)		
The Sexton Blake Library (4th Series) 424	Dressed to Kill	D. Herbert Hyde (Derek Chambers)		
The Sexton Blake Library (4th Series) 425	Shadow of a Gun	Martin Thomas (Thomas Martin)		
The Sexton Blake Library (4th Series) 426	Stop Press – Homicide!	Rex Dolphin		
The Sexton Blake Library (4th Series) 427	The Violent Ones	Peter Saxon (W. Howard Baker)		
The Sexton Blake Library (4th Series) 428	Time For Murder	James Stagg		
The Sexton Blake Library (4th Series) 429	Invitation to a Murder	Jack Trevor Story		
The Sexton Blake Library (4th Series) 430	Safari with Fear	Rex Hardinge		
The Sexton Blake Library (4th Series) 431	Passport into Fear	W. Howard Baker		
The Sexton Blake Library (4th Series) 432	Courier for Crime	Jack Trevor Story		
The Sexton Blake Library (4th Series) 433	Catch a Tiger!	Martin Thomas (Thomas Martin)		
The Sexton Blake Library (4th Series) 434	Showdown in Sydney	Desmond Reid (Noel Browne)		
The Sexton Blake Library (4th Series) 435	Espresso Jungle; The Penny Murder	W. Howard Baker; Jack Trevor Story		
The Sexton Blake Library (4th Series) 436	Home Sweet Homicide	Jack Trevor Story		
The Sexton Blake Library (4th Series) 437	Walk in the Shadows	Rex Dolphin		
The Sexton Blake Library (4th Series) 438	Touch of Evil	Arthur Maclean (E. C. Tubb)		
The Sexton Blake Library (4th Series) 439	Killer's Playground	Edwin Harrison (Eric Alan Ballard)		
The Sexton Blake Library (4th Series) 440	Fear is my Shadow	Martin Thomas (Thomas Martin)		
The Sexton Blake Library (4th Series) 441	A Cold Night for Murder	Martin Thomas (Thomas Martin)		
The Sexton Blake Library (4th Series) 442	Guilty Party!	Rex Dolphin		

== 1960 ==
Publication	Title	Author	Key Characters	Notes
Knockout (strip) 2nd Jan	The Case of the Swinging Bell	Anon. (Unknown/Kennedy)		
Knockout (strip) 9th Jan	The Case of the Station Call Clue	Anon. (Unknown/Kennedy)		
Knockout (strip) 16th Jan	The Case of the Daylight Robbery	Anon. (Unknown/Kennedy)		
Knockout (strip) 23rd Jan	The Case of the Sky Raiders	Anon. (Unknown/Kennedy)		
Knockout (strip) 30th Jan	The Case of the Blue Slipper	Anon. (Unknown/Kennedy)		
Knockout (strip) 6th Feb	The Case of the Eye of Talagi	Anon. (Unknown/Kennedy)		
Knockout (strip) 13th Feb	The Case of the Stolen Trophies	Anon. (Unknown/Kennedy)		
Knockout (strip) 20th Feb	The Case of the Duke of Bullion Thieves	Anon. (Unknown/Kennedy)		
Knockout (strip) 27th Feb	The Case of the Warehouse Mystery	Anon. (Unknown/Kennedy)		
Knockout (strip) 5th Mar	The Vanishing Priceless Necklace	Anon. (Unknown/Kennedy)		
Knockout (strip) 12th Mar	The Stolen Jewel Box	Anon. (Unknown/Kennedy)		
Knockout (strip) 19th Mar	The Clue of the Crushed Cigarettes	Anon. (Unknown/Donnison)		
Knockout (strip) 26th Mar	The Mid-Air Theft	Anon. (Unknown/Kennedy)		
Knockout (strip) 2nd Apr	The Boiling Peril	Anon. (Unknown/Kennedy)		
Knockout (strip) 9th Apr	The Joker	Anon. (Unknown/Kennedy)		
Knockout (strip) 16th Apr	The Case of the Motorway Mystery	Anon. (Unknown/Donnison)		
Knockout (strip) 23rd Apr	The Vanishing Thief	Anon. (Unknown/Donnison)		
Knockout (strip) 30th Apr	The Case of the Mystery of the Stolen Blueprints	Anon. (Unknown/Donnison)		
Knockout (strip) 7 May	The Case of the Running Man	Anon. (Unknown/Donnison)		
Knockout (strip) 14 May	The Real Life Murder	Anon. (Unknown/Donnison)		
Knockout (strip) 21 May	The Man Who Planned the Perfect Crime	Anon. (Unknown/Donnison)		
Knockout (strip) 28 May	The Mystery of the Thief Who Wasn't There	Anon. (Unknown/Donnison)		
Knockout (strip) 4th Jun	The Smugglers	Anon. (Unknown/Donnison)		
Knockout (strip) 11th Jun	The Man Who Didn't Believe in Banks	Anon. (Unknown/Donnison)		
Knockout (strip) 18th Jun	The Fearless Prince	Anon. (Unknown/Kennedy)		
Knockout (strip) 25th Jun	The Mysterious Case of the Six-Handed Idol	Anon. (Unknown/Donnison)		
Knockout Annual 1960	The Case of the Hermit's Treasure (strip); The Case of the Flying Secrets (strip); The Case of Rocco Flint (strip); The Case of the Night Smuggler (strip)	Anon. (Unknown/Hamilton)		
The Sexton Blake Library (4th Series) 443	Epitaph to Treason	W. A. Ballinger (W. Howard Baker)		
The Sexton Blake Library (4th Series) 444	Desert Intrigue	James Stagg		
The Sexton Blake Library (4th Series) 445	Mission to Mexico	Arthur Maclean (George Paul Mann)		
The Sexton Blake Library (4th Series) 446	Murder Made Easy	Desmond Reid (Eddie Player)		
The Sexton Blake Library (4th Series) 447	This Man Must Die!	W. A. Ballinger (W. Howard Baker)		
The Sexton Blake Library (4th Series) 448	Bred to Kill	Martin Thomas (Thomas Martin)		
The Sexton Blake Library (4th Series) 449	Conflict Within	Desmond Reid (G. W. Sowman)		
The Sexton Blake Library (4th Series) 450	Bullets to Baghdad	Philip Chambers		
The Sexton Blake Library (4th Series) 451	The Angry Night	W. Howard Baker		
The Sexton Blake Library (4th Series) 452	Witch-Hunt!	Desmond Reid (Rosamond M. Story)		
The Sexton Blake Library (4th Series) 453	Man on the Run	Arthur Kirby (George P. Mann)		
The Sexton Blake Library (4th Series) 454	Design for Vengeance	Martin Thomas (Thomas Martin)		
The Sexton Blake Library (4th Series) 455	Murder Comes Calling	Desmond Reid (James Stagg)		
The Sexton Blake Library (4th Series) 456	Hurricane Warning!	Richard Williams (John Laffin)		
The Sexton Blake Library (4th Series) 457	The World-Shakers!	Desmond Reid (Rex Dolphin)		
The Sexton Blake Library (4th Series) 458	Large Type Killer	Richard Williams (J. T. Story)		
The Sexton Blake Library (4th Series) 459	Date with Danger	Martin Thomas (Thomas Martin)		
The Sexton Blake Library (4th Series) 460	Some Died Laughing	Rex Dolphin		
The Sexton Blake Library (4th Series) 461	Violence in Quiet Places; The Confessing Killer	Jack Trevor Story 'Splash' Kirby (Unknown)		
The Sexton Blake Library (4th Series) 462	Journey to Genoa	F. Dubrez Fawcett		
The Sexton Blake Library (4th Series) 463	Contract for a Killer	Desmond Reid (Noel Browne)		
The Sexton Blake Library (4th Series) 464	The Big Steal	Jack Trevor Story		
The Sexton Blake Library (4th Series) 465	Danger on the Flip Side	Jack Trevor Story		
The Sexton Blake Library (4th Series) 466	Dead Man's Destiny	Martin Thomas (Thomas Martin)		

== 1961 ==
Publication	Title	Author	Key Characters	Notes
Knockout Annual 1961	The Case of the Vanished Witness (strip); The Case of the Exploding Rockets (strip); The Case of the Vanished Schoolboy (strip); The Case of the Seventeen Chimes (strip)	Anon. (Unknown/Pashley)		
The Sexton Blake Library (4th Series) 467	The Devil to Pay	Rex Dolphin		
The Sexton Blake Library (4th Series) 468	Thief of Clubs	Gilbert Johns (James Stagg)		
The Sexton Blake Library (4th Series) 469	Shot from the Dark	Philip Chambers		
The Sexton Blake Library (4th Series) 470	Pursuit to Algeria	Arthur Maclean (George Paul Mann)		
The Sexton Blake Library (4th Series) 471	Something to Kill About	Desmond Reid (Robert C. Elliott)		
The Sexton Blake Library (4th Series) 472	Assault and Pepper	Jack Trevor Story		
The Sexton Blake Library (4th Series) 473	Suddenly It's Murder	Jack Trevor Story		
The Sexton Blake Library (4th Series) 474	State of Fear	Desmond Reid (George Hamilton Teed)		
The Sexton Blake Library (4th Series) 475	Lovely But Lethal	Peter Saxon (W. Howard Baker)		
The Sexton Blake Library (4th Series) 476	Deadly Persuasion	Desmond Reid (Colin Robertson)		
The Sexton Blake Library (4th Series) 477	Rogue's Harbour	Jack Trevor Story	Arthur 'Splash' Kirby	
The Sexton Blake Library (4th Series) 478	Murderer's Rock	Desmond Reid (Wilfred McNeilly)		
The Sexton Blake Library (4th Series) 479	The Television Murders	W. A. Ballinger (W. Howard Baker)		
The Sexton Blake Library (4th Series) 480	Vote for Violence	Gilbert Johns (James Stagg)		
The Sexton Blake Library (4th Series) 481	Vendetta!	Richard Williams (Stephen Frances)		
The Sexton Blake Library (4th Series) 482	Murder by Moonlight	Desmond Reid (Wilfred McNeilly)		
The Sexton Blake Library (4th Series) 483	Death Her Destination	Warwick Jardine (Francis Warwick)		
The Sexton Blake Library (4th Series) 484	Trouble Is My Name	Rex Dolphin		
The Sexton Blake Library (4th Series) 485	Assignment Doomsday	Martin Thomas (Thomas Martin)	Arthur 'Splash' Kirby; Gideon Ashley	
The Sexton Blake Library (4th Series) 486	The Corpse Came Too!	Desmond Reid (A. A. Glynn)		
The Sexton Blake Library (4th Series) 487	Danger's Child	Jack Trevor Story		
The Sexton Blake Library (4th Series) 488	Bullets are Trumps	Desmond Reid		
The Sexton Blake Library (4th Series) 489	Keep it Secret!	Philip Chambers		
The Sexton Blake Library (4th Series) 490	Hunt the Lady	Desmond Reid (A. Garstin)		

== 1962 ==
Publication	Title	Author	Key Characters	Notes
Collectors' Digest Annual 16	Face Value (fan fiction)	Eric Fayne	Collectors' Digest	
The Sexton Blake Library (4th Series) 491	Terror Loch	Wilfred McNeilly	Fleetway Publications Ltd	
The Sexton Blake Library (4th Series) 492	Death on a High Note	Desmond Reid (V. J. Hanson)	Fleetway Publications Ltd	
The Sexton Blake Library (4th Series) 493	Countdown for Murder	George Sydney (Sydney Bounds)	Fleetway Publications Ltd	
The Sexton Blake Library (4th Series) 494	Bargain in Blood	Arthur Maclean (George P. Mann)	Fleetway Publications Ltd	
The Sexton Blake Library (4th Series) 495	Dead on Cue	Desmond Reid (Anthony Douse)	Fleetway Publications Ltd	
The Sexton Blake Library (4th Series) 496	Come Dark, Come Evil	Wilfred McNeilly	Fleetway Publications Ltd	
The Sexton Blake Library (4th Series) 497	Death in Dockland	Desmond Reid (G. W. Sowman)	Fleetway Publications Ltd	
The Sexton Blake Library (4th Series) 498	Torment was a Redhead	Richard Williams (Stephen Frances)	Fleetway Publications Ltd	
The Sexton Blake Library (4th Series) 499	Spotlight on Murder; Plus; In the Red	Martin Thomas (Thomas Martin); Jack Trevor Story	Fleetway Publications Ltd	
The Sexton Blake Library (4th Series) 500	Somebody Wants Me Dead	Richard Williams (Stephen Frances)	Fleetway Publications Ltd	
The Sexton Blake Library (4th Series) 501	Caribbean Crisis	Desmond Reid (Michael Moorcock)	Fleetway Publications Ltd	
The Sexton Blake Library (4th Series) 502	The Weak and The Strong	Arthur Kent	Fleetway Publications Ltd	
The Sexton Blake Library (4th Series) 503	High Summer Homicide	Arthur Kirby (Stephen Frances)	Fleetway Publications Ltd	
The Sexton Blake Library (4th Series) 504	Studio One Murder	W. A. Ballinger (W. Howard Baker)	Fleetway Publications Ltd	
The Sexton Blake Library (4th Series) 505	White Mercenary	Peter Saxon (W. Howard Baker)	Fleetway Publications Ltd	
The Sexton Blake Library (4th Series) 506	The Reluctant Gunman	W. Howard Baker	Fleetway Publications Ltd	
The Sexton Blake Library (4th Series) 507	Killer Pack	Wilfred McNeilly	Fleetway Publications Ltd	
The Sexton Blake Library (4th Series) 508	Moscow Manhunt	Philip Chambers	Fleetway Publications Ltd	
The Sexton Blake Library (4th Series) 509	Death and Little Girl Blue	V. J. Hanson	Fleetway Publications Ltd	
The Sexton Blake Library (4th Series) 510	Dangerous Playmate	Philip Chambers	Fleetway Publications Ltd	
The Sexton Blake Library (4th Series) 511	The Big Smear	W. Howard Baker	Fleetway Publications Ltd	
The Sexton Blake Library (4th Series) 512	Savage Venture	W. A. Ballinger (W. Howard Baker)	Fleetway Publications Ltd	
The Sexton Blake Library (4th Series) 513	The Man Who Killed Me!	Arthur Maclean (T. C. P. Webb)	Fleetway Publications Ltd	
The Sexton Blake Library (4th Series) 514	A Corpse for Christmas	W. A. Ballinger (W. Howard Baker)	Fleetway Publications Ltd	

== 1963 ==
The Sexton Blake Library comes to an end. All titles published by Fleetway Publications Ltd

Publication	Title	Author	Key Characters	Notes
The Sexton Blake Library (4th Series) 515	Anger at World's End	Desmond Reid (J. N. Chance)		
The Sexton Blake Library (4th Series) 516	Death in Small Doses	Martin Thomas (Thomas Martin)		
The Sexton Blake Library (4th Series) 517	The Impostor	P. Chambers and W. Howard Baker		
The Sexton Blake Library (4th Series) 518	The Slaying of Julian Summers	Richard Williams (Stephen Frances)		
The Sexton Blake Library (4th Series) 519	Cult of Darkness	Desmond Reid (V. J. Hanson)		
The Sexton Blake Library (4th Series) 520	Speak Ill of the Dead	Richard Williams (Rex Dolphin)		
The Sexton Blake Library (4th Series) 521	Lotus Leaves and Larceny	Philip Chambers		
The Sexton Blake Library (4th Series) 522	Murder in Camera	W. A. Ballinger (W. Howard Baker)		
The Sexton Blake Library (4th Series) 523	Murder by Proxy	R. Williams (B. Hopkins/M. Marquis)		
The Sexton Blake Library (4th Series) 524	The Girl Who Saw Too Much	Desmond Reid (Sydney Bounds)		
The Sexton Blake Library (4th Series) 525	The Sound of Murder	Martin Thomas (Thomas Martin)		
The Sexton Blake Library (4th Series) 526	The Last Tiger	W. A. Ballinger (W. Howard Baker)		The last title of the Sexton Blake Library which began in 1916

== 1964 ==
None

== 1965 ==
Publication	Title	Author	Publisher	Key Characters	Notes
Anthology	The First Sexton Blake Omnibus	Wilfred McNeilly; Martin Thomas (Thomas Martin)	Howard Baker Books		
Anthology	The Second Sexton Blake Omnibus	W. A. Ballinger (W. Howard Baker); Desmond Reid (Wilfred McNeilly)	Howard Baker Books		
Anthology	The Third Sexton Blake Omnibus	W. A. Ballinger (W. Howard Baker); Arthur Maclean (George Paul Mann)	Howard Baker Books		
Anthology	The Fourth Sexton Blake Omnibus	Martin Thomas (Thomas Martin); Peter Saxon (W. Howard Baker)	Howard Baker Books		
The Sexton Blake Library (5th Series) 1	Murderer at Large	W. A. Ballinger (W. Howard Baker)	Fleetway Publications Ltd		
The Sexton Blake Library (5th Series) 2	Let My People Be	Desmond Reid (Wilfred McNeilly)	Fleetway Publications Ltd		
The Sexton Blake Library (5th Series) 3	Laird of Evil	Martin Thomas (Thomas Martin)	Fleetway Publications Ltd		
The Sexton Blake Library (5th Series) 4	The Break Out	Wilfred McNeilly	Fleetway Publications Ltd		
The Sexton Blake Library (5th Series) 5	Slaying on the 16th Floor	Arthur Maclean	Fleetway Publications Ltd		
The Sexton Blake Library (5th Series) 6	The Witches of Notting Hill	W. A. Ballinger (W. Howard Baker)	Fleetway Publications Ltd		
The Sexton Blake Library (5th Series) 7	The Man with the Iron Chest	Richard Williams (Stephen Frances)	Fleetway Publications Ltd		
The Sexton Blake Library (5th Series) 8	Wanted for Questioning	Wilfred McNeilly	Fleetway Publications Ltd		
The Sexton Blake Library (5th Series) 9	The Mind Killers	Martin Thomas (Thomas Martin)	Fleetway Publications Ltd		
The Sexton Blake Library (5th Series) 10	Vengeance is Ours!	Peter Saxon (W. Howard Baker)	Fleetway Publications Ltd		
The Sexton Blake Library (5th Series) 11	Beat on an Orange Drum	Desmond Reid (W. Howard Baker)	Fleetway Publications Ltd		
The Sexton Blake Library (5th Series) 12	The Savage Squeeze	Arthur Maclean (George Paul Mann)	Fleetway Publications Ltd		
The Sexton Blake Library (5th Series) 13	I, the Hangman	W. A. Ballinger (W. Howard Baker)	Fleetway Publications Ltd		
The Sexton Blake Library (5th Series) 14	The Case of the Stag at Bay	Wilfred McNeilly	Fleetway Publications Ltd		
The Sexton Blake Library (5th Series) 15	Death in the Top Twenty	Wilfred McNeilly	Fleetway Publications Ltd		
The Sexton Blake Library (5th Series) 16	The Fugitive	W. Howard Baker	Fleetway Publications Ltd		
The Sexton Blake Library (5th Series) 17	The Company of Bandits	Jack Trevor Story	Fleetway Publications Ltd		
The Sexton Blake Library (5th Series) 18	Such Men are Dangerous	Martin Thomas (Thomas Martin)	Fleetway Publications Ltd		
The Sexton Blake Library (5th Series) 19	The Sniper	Richard Williams (Stephen Frances)	Fleetway Publications Ltd		
The Sexton Blake Library (5th Series) 20	The Strange Face of Murder	W. A. Ballinger (Unknown)	Fleetway Publications Ltd		
Tit-Bits 4,131	The Girl Who Saw Too Much (part 1)	Desmond Reid (Sydney Bounds)	George Newnes, London		
Tit-Bits 4,132	The Girl Who Saw Too Much (part 2)	Desmond Reid (Sydney Bounds)	George Newnes, London		
Tit-Bits 4,133	The Girl Who Saw Too Much (part 3)	Desmond Reid (Sydney Bounds)	George Newnes, London		
Tit-Bits 4,134	Moscow Manhunt (part 1)	Philip Chambers	George Newnes, London		
Tit-Bits 4,135	Moscow Manhunt (part 2)	Philip Chambers	George Newnes, London		
Tit-Bits 4,136	Moscow Manhunt (part 3)	Philip Chambers	George Newnes, London		
Tit-Bits 4,137	Hurricane Warning (part 1)	Richard Williams (W. Howard Baker)	George Newnes, London		
Tit-Bits 4,138	Hurricane Warning (part 2)	Richard Williams (W. Howard Baker)	George Newnes, London		
Tit-Bits 4,139	Hurricane Warning (part 3)	Richard Williams (W. Howard Baker)	George Newnes, London		
Tit-Bits 4,140	Hurricane Warning (part 4)	Richard Williams (W. Howard Baker)	George Newnes, London		

== 1966 ==
Publication	Title	Author	Publisher	Key Characters	Notes
The Sexton Blake Library (5th Series) 21	Corpse to Cuba	Arthur Kent	Mayflower-Dell Books		
The Sexton Blake Library (5th Series) 22	Every Man an Enemy	W. Howard Baker	Mayflower-Dell Books		
The Sexton Blake Library (5th Series) 23	The Case of the Muckrakers	Wilfred McNeilly	Mayflower-Dell Books		
The Sexton Blake Library (5th Series) 24	Murder on the Monte	Ross Richards	Mayflower-Dell Books		
The Sexton Blake Library (5th Series) 25	The Deadlier of the Species	Desmond Reid (Stephen Frances)	Mayflower-Dell Books		
The Sexton Blake Library (5th Series) 26	Frenzy in the Flesh	Desmond Reid (Wilfred McNeilly)	Mayflower-Dell Books		
The Sexton Blake Library (5th Series) 27	Sorcerers of Set	Martin Thomas (Thomas Martin)	Mayflower-Dell Books		
The Sexton Blake Library (5th Series) 28	The Case of the Bismark Memoirs	Pierre Quiroule (W. W. Sayer)	Mayflower-Dell Books	Granite Grant and Mademoiselle Julie	Reprint of The Mystery Box published in Sexton Blake Library 1st series, #151 in 1920.
The Sexton Blake Library (5th Series) 29	A Starlet for a Penny	W. A. Ballinger (Unknown)	Mayflower-Dell Books		
The Sexton Blake Library (5th Series) 30	Death on the Spike	Desmond Reid (Ross Richards)	Mayflower-Dell Books		
The Sexton Blake Library (5th Series) 31	Murder Goes Nap	Rex Dolphin	Mayflower-Dell Books		
The Sexton Blake Library (5th Series) 32	Fire Over India	W. Howard Baker	Mayflower-Dell Books		
The Sexton Blake Library (5th Series) 33	The Snowman Cometh	Desmond Reid (W. Howard Baker)	Mayflower-Dell Books		

== 1967 ==
Publication	Title	Author	Key Characters	Notes
The Sexton Blake Library (5th Series) 34	Dead Respectable	Desmond Reid (Ross Richards)	Mayflower-Dell Books	
The Sexton Blake Library (5th Series) 35	An Event Called Murder	Martin Thomas (Thomas Martin)	Mayflower-Dell Books	
The Sexton Blake Library (5th Series) 36	This Spy Must Die	Peter Saxon (W. Howard Baker)	Mayflower-Dell Books	
The Sexton Blake Library (5th Series) 37	The Slave Brain	Desmond Reid (Ross Richards)	Mayflower-Dell Books	
The Sexton Blake Library (5th Series) 38	Treason Remembered	W. Howard Baker	Mayflower-Dell Books	
The Sexton Blake Library (5th Series) 39	Crash and Carry	Stephen Christie (D. S. C. Kuruppu)	Mayflower-Dell Books	
The Sexton Blake Library (5th Series) 40	The Trail of the Golden Girl	Rex Dolphin	Mayflower-Dell Books	
The Sexton Blake Library (5th Series) 41	Star Crossed	Matt Mead (Ross Richards)	Mayflower-Dell Books	

== 1968 ==
Publication	Title	Author	Key Characters	Notes
Novel	Danger At Westways	Donald Stuart	Dean & Son Ltd	
Novel	The Secret of the Snows	Gilbert Chester (H. H. C. Gibbons)	Dean & Son Ltd	
Novel	Raffles' Crime in Gibraltar	Barry Perowne (P. Atkey)	Dean & Son Ltd	
Novel	The Secret of the Ten Bales	Anthony Parsons	Dean & Son Ltd	
The Sexton Blake Library (5th Series) 42	Brainwashed	Martin Thomas (Thomas Martin)	Mayflower Books	
The Sexton Blake Library (5th Series) 43	The Abductors	Desmond Reid (Christopher Lowder)	Mayflower Books	
The Sexton Blake Library (5th Series) 44	The Case of the Renegade Agent	Desmond Reid (Unknown)	Mayflower Books	
The Sexton Blake Library (5th Series) 45	Down Among the Ad Men	W. A. Ballinger (Wilfred McNeilly)	Mayflower Books	
Valiant 13th Jan	Sexton Blake and the House of a Thousand Perils (part 1)	Anon. (Unknown/Dadswell)	Fleetway Publications Ltd	
Valiant 20th Jan	Sexton Blake and the House of a Thousand Perils (part 2)	Anon. (Unknown/Dadswell)	Fleetway Publications Ltd	
Valiant 27th Jan	Sexton Blake and the House of a Thousand Perils (part 3)	Anon. (Unknown/Dadswell)	Fleetway Publications Ltd	
Valiant 3rd Feb	Sexton Blake and the House of a Thousand Perils (part 4)	Anon. (Unknown/Dadswell)	Fleetway Publications Ltd	
Valiant 10th Feb	Sexton Blake and the House of a Thousand Perils (part 5)	Anon. (Unknown/Dadswell)	Fleetway Publications Ltd	
Valiant 17th Feb	Sexton Blake and the House of a Thousand Perils (part 6)	Anon. (Unknown/Dadswell)	Fleetway Publications Ltd	
Valiant 24th Feb	Sexton Blake and the House of a Thousand Perils (part 7)	Anon. (Unknown/Dadswell)	Fleetway Publications Ltd	
Valiant 2nd Mar	Sexton Blake and the Ghost of the Highwayman (part 1)	Anon. (Unknown/Dadswell)	Fleetway Publications Ltd	
Valiant 9th Mar	Sexton Blake and the Ghost of the Highwayman (part 2)	Anon. (Unknown/Dadswell)	Fleetway Publications Ltd	
Valiant 16th Mar	Sexton Blake and the Ghost of the Highwayman (part 3)	Anon. (Unknown/Dadswell)	Fleetway Publications Ltd	
Valiant 23rd Mar	Sexton Blake and the Ghost of the Highwayman (part 4)	Anon. (Unknown/Dadswell)	Fleetway Publications Ltd	
Valiant 30th Mar	Sexton Blake and the Ghost of the Highwayman (part 5)	Anon. (Unknown/Dadswell)	Fleetway Publications Ltd	
Valiant 6th Apr	Sexton Blake and the Ghost of the Highwayman (part 6)	Anon. (Unknown/Dadswell)	Fleetway Publications Ltd	
Valiant 13th Apr	Sexton Blake and the Ghost of the Highwayman (part 7)	Anon. (Unknown/Dadswell)	Fleetway Publications Ltd	
Valiant 20th Apr	Sexton Blake and the Ghost of the Highwayman (part 8)	Anon. (Unknown/Dadswell)	Fleetway Publications Ltd	
Valiant 27th Apr	Sexton Blake and the Ghost of the Highwayman (part 9)	Anon. (Unknown/Dadswell)	Fleetway Publications Ltd	
Valiant 4 May	Sexton Blake and the Ghost of the Highwayman (part 10)	Anon. (Unknown/Dadswell)	Fleetway Publications Ltd	
Valiant 11 May	Sexton Blake and the Ghost of the Highwayman (part 11)	Anon. (Unknown/Dadswell)	Fleetway Publications Ltd	
Valiant 18 May	Sexton Blake and the Ghost of the Highwayman (part 12)	Anon. (Unknown/Dadswell)	Fleetway Publications Ltd	
Valiant 25 May	Sexton Blake and the Phantom of Peril Rock (part 1)	Anon. (Unknown/Dadswell)	Fleetway Publications Ltd	
Valiant 1st Jun	Sexton Blake and the Phantom of Peril Rock (part 2)	Anon. (Unknown/Dadswell)	Fleetway Publications Ltd	
Valiant 8th Jun	Sexton Blake and the Phantom of Peril Rock (part 3)	Anon. (Unknown/Dadswell)	Fleetway Publications Ltd	
Valiant 15th Jun	Sexton Blake and the Phantom of Peril Rock (part 4)	Anon. (Unknown/Dadswell)	Fleetway Publications Ltd	
Valiant 22nd Jun	Sexton Blake and the Phantom of Peril Rock (part 5)	Anon. (Unknown/Dadswell)	Fleetway Publications Ltd	
Valiant 29th Jun	Sexton Blake and the Phantom of Peril Rock (part 6)	Anon. (Unknown/Dadswell)	Fleetway Publications Ltd	
Valiant 6th Jul	Sexton Blake and the Phantom of Peril Rock (part 7)	Anon. (Unknown/Dadswell)	Fleetway Publications Ltd	
Valiant 13th Jul	Sexton Blake and the Phantom of Peril Rock (part 8)	Anon. (Unknown/Dadswell)	Fleetway Publications Ltd	
Valiant 20th Jul	Sexton Blake and the Phantom of Peril Rock (part 9)	Anon. (Unknown/Dadswell)	Fleetway Publications Ltd	
Valiant 27th Jul	Sexton Blake and the Phantom of Peril Rock (part 10)	Anon. (Unknown/Dadswell)	Fleetway Publications Ltd	
Valiant 3rd Aug	Sexton Blake and the Phantom of Peril Rock (part 11)	Anon. (Unknown/Dadswell)	Fleetway Publications Ltd	
Valiant 10th Aug	Sexton Blake and the Phantom of Peril Rock (part 12)	Anon. (Unknown/Dadswell)	Fleetway Publications Ltd	
Valiant 17th Aug	Sexton Blake and the Phantom of Peril Rock (part 13)	Anon. (Unknown/Dadswell)	Fleetway Publications Ltd	
Valiant 24th Aug	Sexton Blake and the Phantom of Peril Rock (part 14)	Anon. (Unknown/Dadswell)	Fleetway Publications Ltd	
Valiant 31st Aug	Sexton Blake and the Phantom of Peril Rock (part 15)	Anon. (Unknown/Dadswell)	Fleetway Publications Ltd	
Valiant 7th Sep	Sexton Blake and the Phantom of Peril Rock (part 16)	Anon. (Unknown/Dadswell)	Fleetway Publications Ltd	
Valiant 14th Sep	Sexton Blake and the Phantom of Peril Rock (part 17)	Anon. (Unknown/Dadswell)	Fleetway Publications Ltd	
Valiant 21st Sep	Sexton Blake and the Phantom of Peril Rock (part 18)	Anon. (Unknown/Dadswell)	Fleetway Publications Ltd	
Valiant 28th Sep	Sexton Blake and the Museum of Fear (part 1)	Anon. (Unknown/Dadswell)	Fleetway Publications Ltd	
Valiant 5th Oct	Sexton Blake and the Museum of Fear (part 2)	Anon. (Unknown/Dadswell)	Fleetway Publications Ltd	
Valiant 12th Oct	Sexton Blake and the Museum of Fear (part 3)	Anon. (Unknown/Dadswell)	Fleetway Publications Ltd	
Valiant 19th Oct	Sexton Blake and the Museum of Fear (part 4)	Anon. (Unknown/Dadswell)	Fleetway Publications Ltd	
Valiant 26th Oct	Sexton Blake and the Museum of Fear (part 5)	Anon. (Unknown/Dadswell)	Fleetway Publications Ltd	
Valiant 2nd Nov	Sexton Blake and the Museum of Fear (part 6)	Anon. (Unknown/Dadswell)	Fleetway Publications Ltd	
Valiant 9th Nov	Sexton Blake and the Museum of Fear (part 7)	Anon. (Unknown/Dadswell)	Fleetway Publications Ltd	
Valiant 16th Nov	Sexton Blake and the Museum of Fear (part 8)	Anon. (Unknown/Dadswell)	Fleetway Publications Ltd	
Valiant 23rd Nov	Sexton Blake and the Museum of Fear (part 9)	Anon. (Unknown/Dadswell)	Fleetway Publications Ltd	
Valiant 30th Nov	Sexton Blake and the Museum of Fear (part 10)	Anon. (Unknown/Dadswell)	Fleetway Publications Ltd	
Valiant 7th Dec	Sexton Blake and the Museum of Fear (part 11)	Anon. (Unknown/Dadswell)	Fleetway Publications Ltd	
Valiant 14th Dec	Sexton Blake and the Museum of Fear (part 12)	Anon. (Unknown/Dadswell)	Fleetway Publications Ltd	
Valiant 21st Dec	Sexton Blake and the Museum of Fear (part 13)	Anon. (Unknown/Dadswell)	Fleetway Publications Ltd	
Valiant 28th Dec	Sexton Blake and the Museum of Fear (part 14)	Anon. (Unknown/Dadswell)	Fleetway Publications Ltd	
Annual	The Valiant Book of TV's Sexton Blake	Various	Fleetway Publications Ltd	

== 1969 ==
Publication	Title	Author	Key Characters	Notes
Anthology	The Fifth Sexton Blake Omnibus	Ross Richards; W. Howard Baker	Howard Baker Books	
Anthology	The Sixth Sexton Blake Omnibus	Martin Thomas (Thomas Martin); Rex Dolphin	Howard Baker Books	
Anthology	The Seventh Sexton Blake Omnibus	Pierre Quirole (W. W. Sayer); Richard Williams	Howard Baker Books	
Novel	Slaughter in the Sun	Stephen Christie	Howard Baker Books	
Novel	Driven to Kill	Rex Dolphin	Howard Baker Books	
Novel	The Mini-Skirt Murders	Martin Thomas (Thomas Martin)	Howard Baker Books	
Novel	The Case of the Missing Bullion	Peter Saxon (W. Howard Baker) Howard Baker Books		
Valiant 4th Jan	Sexton Blake and the Museum of Fear (part 15)	Anon. (Unknown/Dadswell)	Fleetway Publications Ltd	
Valiant 11th Jan	Sexton Blake and the Museum of Fear (part 16)	Anon. (Unknown/Dadswell)	Fleetway Publications Ltd	
Valiant 18th Jan	Sexton Blake and the Museum of Fear (part 17)	Anon. (Unknown/Dadswell)	Fleetway Publications Ltd	
Valiant 25th Jan	Sexton Blake and the Curse of Gateways Abbey (part 1)	Anon. (Unknown/Dadswell)	Fleetway Publications Ltd	
Valiant 1st Feb	Sexton Blake and the Curse of Gateways Abbey (part 2)	Anon. (Unknown/Dadswell)	Fleetway Publications Ltd	
Valiant 8th Feb	Sexton Blake and the Curse of Gateways Abbey (part 3)	Anon. (Unknown/Dadswell)	Fleetway Publications Ltd	
Valiant 15th Feb	Sexton Blake and the Curse of Gateways Abbey (part 4)	Anon. (Unknown/Dadswell)	Fleetway Publications Ltd	
Valiant 22nd Feb	Sexton Blake and the Curse of Gateways Abbey (part 5)	Anon. (Unknown/Dadswell)	Fleetway Publications Ltd	
Valiant 1st Mar	Sexton Blake and the Curse of Gateways Abbey (part 6)	Anon. (Unknown/Dadswell)	Fleetway Publications Ltd	
Valiant 8th Mar	Sexton Blake and the Curse of Gateways Abbey (part 7)	Anon. (Unknown/Dadswell)	Fleetway Publications Ltd	
Valiant 15th Mar	Sexton Blake and the Curse of Gateways Abbey (part 8)	Anon. (Unknown/Dadswell)	Fleetway Publications Ltd	
Valiant 22nd Mar	Sexton Blake and the Haunted Inn (part 1)	Anon. (Unknown/Dadswell)	Fleetway Publications Ltd	
Valiant 29th Mar	Sexton Blake and the Haunted Inn (part 2)	Anon. (Unknown/Dadswell)	Fleetway Publications Ltd	
Valiant 5th Apr	Sexton Blake and the Haunted Inn (part 3)	Anon. (Unknown/Dadswell)	Fleetway Publications Ltd	
Valiant 12th Apr	Sexton Blake and the Haunted Inn (part 4)	Anon. (Unknown/Dadswell)	Fleetway Publications Ltd	
Valiant 19th Apr	Sexton Blake and the Haunted Inn (part 5)	Anon. (Unknown/Dadswell)	Fleetway Publications Ltd	
Valiant 26th Apr	Sexton Blake and the Haunted Inn (part 6)	Anon. (Unknown/Dadswell)	Fleetway Publications Ltd	
Valiant 3 May	Sexton Blake and the Haunted Inn (part 7)	Anon. (Unknown/Dadswell)	Fleetway Publications Ltd	
Valiant 10 May	Sexton Blake and the Haunted Inn (part 8)	Anon. (Unknown/Dadswell)	Fleetway Publications Ltd	
Valiant 17 May	Sexton Blake and the Haunted Inn (part 9)	Anon. (Unknown/Dadswell)	Fleetway Publications Ltd	
Valiant 24 May	Sexton Blake and the Waxworks Mystery (part 1)	Anon. (Unknown/Dadswell)	Fleetway Publications Ltd	
Valiant 31 May	Sexton Blake and the Waxworks Mystery (part 2)	Anon. (Unknown/Dadswell)	Fleetway Publications Ltd	
Valiant 7th Jun	Sexton Blake and the Waxworks Mystery (part 3)	Anon. (Unknown/Dadswell)	Fleetway Publications Ltd	
Valiant 14th Jun	Sexton Blake and the Waxworks Mystery (part 4)	Anon. (Unknown/Dadswell)	Fleetway Publications Ltd	
Valiant 21st Jun	Sexton Blake and the Waxworks Mystery (part 5)	Anon. (Unknown/Dadswell)	Fleetway Publications Ltd	
Valiant 28th Jun	Sexton Blake and the Waxworks Mystery (part 6)	Anon. (Unknown/Dadswell)	Fleetway Publications Ltd	
Valiant 5th Jul	Sexton Blake and the Waxworks Mystery (part 7)	Anon. (Unknown/Dadswell)	Fleetway Publications Ltd	
Valiant 12th Jul	Sexton Blake and the Waxworks Mystery (part 8)	Anon. (Unknown/Dadswell)	Fleetway Publications Ltd	
Valiant 19th Jul	Sexton Blake and the Waxworks Mystery (part 9)	Anon. (Unknown/Dadswell)	Fleetway Publications Ltd	
Valiant 26th Jul	Sexton Blake and the Black Vulture (part 1)	Anon. (Unknown/Dadswell)	Fleetway Publications Ltd	
Valiant 2nd Aug	Sexton Blake and the Black Vulture (part 2)	Anon. (Unknown/Dadswell)	Fleetway Publications Ltd	
Valiant 9th Aug	Sexton Blake and the Black Vulture (part 3)	Anon. (Unknown/Dadswell)	Fleetway Publications Ltd	
Valiant 16th Aug	Sexton Blake and the Black Vulture (part 4)	Anon. (Unknown/Dadswell)	Fleetway Publications Ltd	
Valiant 23rd Aug	Sexton Blake and the Black Vulture (part 5)	Anon. (Unknown/Dadswell)	Fleetway Publications Ltd	
Valiant 30th Aug	Sexton Blake and the Black Vulture (part 6)	Anon. (Unknown/Dadswell)	Fleetway Publications Ltd	
Valiant 6th Sep	Sexton Blake and the Black Vulture (part 7)	Anon. (Unknown/Dadswell)	Fleetway Publications Ltd	
Valiant 13th Sep	Sexton Blake and the Black Vulture (part 8)	Anon. (Unknown/Dadswell)	Fleetway Publications Ltd	
Valiant 20th Sep	Sexton Blake and the Black Vulture (part 9)	Anon. (Unknown/Dadswell)	Fleetway Publications Ltd	
Valiant 27th Sep	Sexton Blake and the Black Vulture (part 10)	Anon. (Unknown/Dadswell)	Fleetway Publications Ltd	
Valiant 4th Oct	Sexton Blake and the Lake of Doom (part 1)	Anon. (Unknown/Dadswell)	Fleetway Publications Ltd	
Valiant 11th Oct	Sexton Blake and the Lake of Doom (part 2)	Anon. (Unknown/Dadswell)	Fleetway Publications Ltd	
Valiant 18th Oct	Sexton Blake and the Lake of Doom (part 3)	Anon. (Unknown/Dadswell)	Fleetway Publications Ltd	
Valiant 25th Oct	Sexton Blake and the Lake of Doom (part 4)	Anon. (Unknown/Dadswell)	Fleetway Publications Ltd	
Valiant 1st Nov	Sexton Blake and the Lake of Doom (part 5)	Anon. (Unknown/Dadswell)	Fleetway Publications Ltd	
Valiant 8th Nov	Sexton Blake and the Lake of Doom (part 6)	Anon. (Unknown/Dadswell)	Fleetway Publications Ltd	
Valiant 15th Nov	Sexton Blake and the Lake of Doom (part 7)	Anon. (Unknown/Dadswell)	Fleetway Publications Ltd	
Valiant 22nd Nov	Sexton Blake and the Lake of Doom (part 8)	Anon. (Unknown/Dadswell)	Fleetway Publications Ltd	
Valiant 29th Nov	Sexton Blake and the Lake of Doom (part 9)	Anon. (Unknown/Dadswell)	Fleetway Publications Ltd	
Valiant 6th Dec	Sexton Blake and the Lake of Doom (part 10)	Anon. (Unknown/Dadswell)	Fleetway Publications Ltd	
Valiant 13th Dec	Sexton Blake and the Lake of Doom (part 11)	Anon. (Unknown/Dadswell)	Fleetway Publications Ltd	
Valiant 20th Dec	Sexton Blake and the Lake of Doom (part 12)	Anon. (Unknown/Dadswell)	Fleetway Publications Ltd	
Valiant 29th Dec	Sexton Blake and the Lake of Doom (part 13)	Anon. (Unknown/Dadswell)	Fleetway Publications Ltd	

== 1970 ==
Publication	Title	Author	Publisher	Notes
Anthology	The Eighth Sexton Blake Omnibus	W. Howard Baker	Howard Baker Books	Includes: The Fugitive and Fire Over India
Novel	The Season of the Skylark	Jack Trevor Story Howard Baker Books		
Novel	The Blonde and the Boodle	Jack Trevor Story	Howard Baker Books	
Valiant 3rd Jan	Sexton Blake and the Lake of Doom (part 14)	Anon. (Unknown/Dadswell)	Fleetway Publications Ltd	
Valiant 10th Jan	Sexton Blake and the Ghost of Loxton Grange (part 1)	Anon. (Unknown/Dadswell)	Fleetway Publications Ltd	
Valiant 17th Jan	Sexton Blake and the Ghost of Loxton Grange (part 2)	Anon. (Unknown/Dadswell)	Fleetway Publications Ltd	
Valiant 24th Jan	Sexton Blake and the Ghost of Loxton Grange (part 3)	Anon. (Unknown/Dadswell)	Fleetway Publications Ltd	
Valiant 31st Jan	Sexton Blake and the Ghost of Loxton Grange (part 4)	Anon. (Unknown/Dadswell)	Fleetway Publications Ltd	
Valiant 7th Feb	Sexton Blake and the Ghost of Loxton Grange (part 5)	Anon. (Unknown/Dadswell)	Fleetway Publications Ltd	
Valiant 14th Feb	Sexton Blake and the Ghost of Loxton Grange (part 6)	Anon. (Unknown/Dadswell)	Fleetway Publications Ltd	
Valiant 21st Feb	Sexton Blake and the Castle of Fear (part 1)	Anon. (Unknown/Dadswell)	Fleetway Publications Ltd	
Valiant 28th Feb	Sexton Blake and the Castle of Fear (part 2)	Anon. (Unknown/Dadswell)	Fleetway Publications Ltd	
Valiant 7th Mar	Sexton Blake and the Castle of Fear (part 3)	Anon. (Unknown/Dadswell)	Fleetway Publications Ltd	
Valiant 14th Mar	Sexton Blake and the Castle of Fear (part 4)	Anon. (Unknown/Dadswell)	Fleetway Publications Ltd	
Valiant 21st Mar	Sexton Blake and the Castle of Fear (part 5)	Anon. (Unknown/Dadswell)	Fleetway Publications Ltd	
Valiant 28th Mar	Sexton Blake and the Castle of Fear (part 6)	Anon. (Unknown/Dadswell)	Fleetway Publications Ltd	
Valiant 4th Apr	Sexton Blake and the Castle of Fear (part 7)	Anon. (Unknown/Dadswell)	Fleetway Publications Ltd	
Valiant 11th Apr	Sexton Blake and the Mystery of Smugglers' Cove (part 1)	Anon. (Unknown/Dadswell)	Fleetway Publications Ltd	
Valiant 18th Apr	Sexton Blake and the Mystery of Smugglers' Cove (part 2)	Anon. (Unknown/Dadswell)	Fleetway Publications Ltd	
Valiant 25th Apr	Sexton Blake and the Mystery of Smugglers' Cove (part 3)	Anon. (Unknown/Dadswell)	Fleetway Publications Ltd	
Valiant 2 May	Sexton Blake and the Mystery of Smugglers' Cove (part 4)	Anon. (Unknown/Dadswell)	Fleetway Publications Ltd	
Valiant 9 May	Sexton Blake and the Mystery of Smugglers' Cove (part 5)	Anon. (Unknown/Dadswell)	Fleetway Publications Ltd	

== 1971 ==
None

== 1972 ==
Publication	Title	Author	Publisher	Notes
Anthology	The Ninth Sexton Blake Omnibus	W. A. Ballinger (W. Howard Baker); Wilfred McNeilly	Howard Baker Books	
Novel	Company of Bandits	Jack Trevor Story	Howard Baker Books	
Anthology	Sexton Blake: Star of Union Jack	Gwyn Evans; Robert Murray (Robert Murray Graydon); Robert Murray (Robert Murray Graydon); Rex Hardinge; Edwy Searles Brooks; Lewis Jackson (Jack Lewis)	Howard Baker Books	

== 1973 ==
None

== 1974 ==
Publication	Title	Author	Publisher	Notes
Anthology	Crime at Christmas	Gwyn Evans; Edwy Searles Brooks	Howard Baker Books	

== 1975 ==
Publication	Title	Author	Publisher	Notes
Novel	Every Man an Enemy	Howard W Baker	Zenith	This is a reprint of the Sexton Blake Library (fifth series) no. 22 from 1966.

== 1976 ==
Publication	Title	Author	Publisher	Notes
Anthology	Sexton Blake's Early Cases	E. J. Gannon; William Shaw Rae; Arnold Grahame	Arthur Baker Limited	

== 1977 ==
None

== 1978 ==
Publication	Title	Author	Publisher	Notes
Novel	Sexton Blake and the Demon God	John Garforth	Mirror Books	
