= Sexton Blake bibliography part 4: 1979–present =

List of cases featuring Fictional British detective Sexton Blake

Sexton Blake Bibliography 1946–1978
- Author: Harry Blyth (Creator); George Hamilton Teed; Michael Moorcock; Anthony Skene; Mark Hodder; Robert Murray Graydon; Andrew Murray
- Country: United Kingdom
- Language: English
- Genre: Detective fiction
- Publisher: Everyman Paperbacks; Galley Press; Hawk Books; Wordsworth Books; Snowbooks Ltd; Obverse Books; Stillwoods Publishing; Rebellion Developments; Blakiana; ROH Press
- Media type: Comic strips Paperbacks; Hardbacks

Sexton Blake is a fictional detective who has been featured in many British comic strips, novels, and dramatic productions since 1893. He was featured in various British publications from 1893 to 1978 in a variety of formats: single-issue adventures, short stories, serials, and comic strips. In total, Blake appeared in more than 4,000 stories by over 200 different authors.

During its golden age (1920s–1940s), Blake's adventures were widely read and translated into at least twenty different languages, including Swedish, Norwegian, Finnish, Dutch, Spanish, German, Portuguese, Italian, French, Arabic, Hindi, and Afrikaans.

== Publication history ==
The first Sexton Blake story was "The Missing Millionaire". Written by Harry Blyth (using the pseudonym Hal Meredeth), it was published in The Halfpenny Marvel number 6, on 20 December 1893, a story paper owned by the Amalgamated Press. Blyth wrote six more Sexton Blake tales, three for Marvel and three for The Union Jack, a story paper launched in April 1894.

The Amalgamated Press purchased the copyright to Blake along with the first story Blyth had submitted and from 1895 onwards several authors began to pen Blake tales. From August 1905 onwards, Blake became the resident character in The Union Jack, appearing in every issue until its transformation into the Detective Weekly in 1933.

Blake's popularity began to grow during the Edwardian era, and he appeared in a number of different story papers. These appearances included serials in the tabloid sized Boys' Friend, complete tales in the pocket-sized Penny Pictorial, and short stores in Answers, one of the Amalgamated Press' most popular papers. Longer tales of 60,000 words or so appeared in The Boys' Friend Library and the success of these led to the creation of The Sexton Blake Library in 1915. This digest-sized publication specialized in longer tales, and at the height of its popularity was published 5 times a month. It ran for just under 50 years.

In 1959 Fleetway Publications acquired the rights to Sexton Blake adventures and published The Sexton Blake Library until the title's demise. The final tale, The Last Tiger, was published in June 1963.

In 1965, Blake's editor William Howard Baker licensed the rights of the Sexton Blake character. He published the fifth series of The Sexton Blake Library independently via Mayflower-Dell Books, which ran until 1968. He then issued a final series of four Sexton Blake novels, using his Howard Baker Books imprint, in 1969. From 1968 to 1971 Valiant published new comic strips in the style of the Knockout strips from decades earlier. Blake's last original appearance was in Sexton Blake and the Demon God "a period thriller with ancient curses and cliff-hanger endings" in 1978.

There were a few anthologies and reprints in the 80s and 90s. In 2009 Wordsworth Books published the casebook of Sexton Blake and Snowbooks published Sexton Blake Detective. 2018 saw an uptick in Sexton Blake reprints, with the first print novels published by Stillwoods Publishing, a Canadian publisher out of Nova Scotia. In 2020, ROH Press began publishing Sexton Blake tales with Sexton Blake The Early Years, a collection of Blake's first cases. British publishers Rebellion Publishing produced four anthologies in 2020–21, each introduced by Blakeologist Mark Hodder.

== Compiling the Sexton Blake bibliography ==
The bibliography originated in the pages of Story Paper Collectors' Digest where collectors began recording and compiling the list of Blake tales that appeared in The Union Jack and The Sexton Blake Library. A master corpus was assembled in the late 1950s by The Sexton Blake Circle to facilitate the research of the Blake story papers.

Titles and authorship were verified from the archived records of the Amalgamated Press. As many of authors published in The Union Jack before 1929 were uncredited, the Sexton Blake Circle adopted the practice of accrediting authorship to the person who received payment for the tale until proven otherwise. Led by Len and Josie Packman expansion and revision on the master corpus was ongoing throughout the early 1960s as research brought more titles to light.

The Sexton Blake Catalogue was published in 1966. The announcement in Story Paper Collectors' Digest read:

This long anticipated catalogue, prepared with loving care by members of the Sexton Blake Circle, is now awaiting you. It is a veritable encyclopaedia of Sexton Blake lore, listing all the titles, authors, and leading characters of the stories in The Union Jack and in The Sexton Blake Library from the very beginning till the present day. There is also a wealth of information on the Sexton Blake adventures which featured in other periodicals. Beautifully produced, it sums up to a magnificent job.

In 1970 Josie Packman announced a reprint of the Sexton Blake Catalogue along with a "supplement of all the new information."

In July 1971 its completion and availability was announced in the Collector's Digest with the following announcement:

FOR ALL SEXTON BLAKE FANS
The Supplement to the Sexton Blake Catalogue is now ready, containing all the information which was not to hand at the time the main Catalogue was first published. It contains all the titles in the most recent series of the Sexton Blake Library; information concerning all the Blake serials of years gone by; particulars of Blake as seen in stage plays and on the talking screen; titles of Blake stories in the rare Penny Pictorial and in Answers Library, plus information concerning the pre-war Sexton Blake Annuals.

Since publication the Catalogue and supplement have been considered an "invaluable" tool by researchers interested in the Blake canon. As Blake research was ongoing as new information or titles were discovered in primary sources, the catalogue was updated.

The catalogue provided verification that Sexton Blake had appeared in roughly 4000 tales by around 200 authors. Based on this statistic, Otto Penzler and Chris Steinbrunner writing in the Encyclopedia of Mystery and Detection, concluded that Sexton Blake was "the hero of more novels and stories than any other detective."

In 1993 the second edition of the "famous Sexton Blake Catalogue" was announced in honour of the detective's 100th birthday. The announcement read:

With over 120 pages of text and illustrations listing all the known appearances of the world's greatest detective in print, TV, radio and celluloid, this bibliography is a must for all collectors.

It was issued by The Sexton Blake Library of the London Old Boys' Book Club.

Additions to the catalogue since 1993 have been made from publisher and retailer websites. ISBN numbers, where applicable, have been added to assist verification.

== The Sexton Blake bibliography parts 1 to 4 ==
Due to the extreme length of the bibliography it has been divided into four eras:

- 1893–1911: The Victorian/Edwardian Era Sexton Blake bibliography
- 1912–1945: The Master Criminals Era Sexton Blake bibliography part 2: 1912–1945
- 1946–1978: The Post War Era Sexton Blake bibliography part 3: 1946–1978
- 1979–present: Revivals and Republications: Sexton Blake bibliography part 4: 1979–present

== Notes to the cases ==
All authors have been listed and linked to their Wikipedia biographies where possible. Many of these authors are remembered nowadays for the adversaries they pitted against Blake or the femme fatales they introduced. Many of these popular characters and their appearances have been described and included as well as key incidents in the life of Sexton Blake.

== 1979 to 1985 ==
None

== 1986 ==
Publication	Title	Author	Publisher	Notes	ISBN
Anthology	Sexton Blake Wins	Gwyn Evans; George Hamilton Teed; John Hunter; Rex Hardinge; Donald Stuart; Anthony Parsons; Anthony Skene (George N. Philips); Robert Murray (Robert Murray Graydon); Pierre Quiroule (W. W. Sayer)	Everyman Paperbacks	Features: The House of the Hanging Sword; The Treasure of Tortoise Island; Under Sexton Blake's Orders; The Man I Killed; The Green Jester; The Secret Amulet; The Box of Ho Sen; The Four Guests Mystery; Sexton Blake Solves It	978-0460024822

== 1987 ==
Publication	Title	Author	Publisher	Notes	ISBN
Anthology	The Sexton Blake Casebook	Leonard H. Brooks; William Murray Graydon; William J. Bayfield; Hal Meredeth (Harry Blyth)	Galley Press		978-1840221701
Vintage Detective Stories	The Episode of the Black Diamond	Anon. (Cecil Hayter)	Galley Press		978-0861366170

== 1988 ==
None

== 1989 ==
Publication	Title	Author	Publisher	Notes	ISBN
Anthology	The Sexton Blake Detective Library	George Hamilton Teed; Andrew Murray; John W. Bobin; Anon. (Matthews/Heade)	Hawk Books	Features: The Yellow Tiger; Ill-Gotten Gains; The Shadow of His Crime; The Rajah's Revenge; The League of Crime; The first four tales were reprints of the first four tales of The Sexton Blake Library published in 1915.	978-0948248962
Giant Holiday Adventure Comic Album	Sexton Blake and the Loch Kyle Monster	Edited and compiled by Mike Higgs,	Hawk Comics		978-0948248115

== 1990 to 1993 ==
None

== 1994 ==
Publication	Title	Author	Publisher	Notes
Non-Fiction	Sexton Blake: A Celebration of the Great Detective	Norman Wright & David Ashford	Museum Press	

== 1995 to 1997 ==
None

== 1998 ==
Publication	Title	Author	Publisher	Notes	ISBN
The Shadows of Sherlock Holmes	Sexton Blake and the Time Killer	Anon. (Gwyn Evans)	Wordsworth Editions Ltd	Anthology of Victorian Era Detectives; Collection edited by David Stuart Davies	978-1853267444

== 1999 ==
None

== 2000 ==
Publication	Title	Author	Publisher	Notes
Sherlock Holmes Gazette #36	Sexton Blake and the White Fairy (fan fiction)	John Hall	Sherlock Holmes Gazette Ltd	
Sherlock Holmes Gazette #40	Sexton Blake and the Curse of Ozymandias (fan fiction)	John Hall	Sherlock Holmes Gazette Ltd	

== 2001 to 2004 ==
None

== 2005 ==
Publication	Title	Author	Publisher	Notes	ISBN
Tales of the Shadowmen – Vol. 1: The Modern Babylon	The Werewolf of Rutherford Grange	G. L. Gick	Black Coat Press	Features Heroes and Villains from Pulp Literature	978-1932983364

== 2006 ==
Publication	Title	Author	Publisher	Notes
Fan fiction	The Séance at Stillwater Mansion	Mark Hodder	Blakiana Website	Published online
Fan fiction	The Return of the Yellow Beetle	Mark Hodder	Blakiana Website	Published online
Fan fiction	Special Dispensation 5 and 6	Mark Hodder	Blakiana Website	Published online
Fan fiction	The Case of the Left Hand of Thoth	Mark Hodder	Blakiana Website	Published online

== 2007 ==
Publication	Title	Author	Publisher	Notes	ISBN
Farmerphile Magazine #8	The Shades of Pemberley (part 1)	Win Scott Eckert	Michael Croteau		
Farmerphile Magazine #9	The Shades of Pemberley (part 2)	Win Scott Eckert	Michael Croteau		
Novel	The Jungle Boy	William Murray Graydon	Wildside Press	Reprint of The Union Jack (2nd Series) 85, 1905	978-1434401892

== 2008 ==
None

== 2009 ==
Publication	Title	Author	Publisher	Notes	ISBN
Anthology	The Casebook of Sexton Blake	Cecil Hayter; W. J. Lomax; Michael Storm (Ernest Semphill); William Murray Graydon; George Hamilton Teed; Robert Murray Graydon	Wordsworth Books	edited by David Stuart Davies	978-1840221701
Anthology	Sexton Blake, Detective	Anthony Skene (George N. Philips); Michael Storm (Ernest Semphill); Edwy Searles Brooks); George Hamilton Teed); Lewis Carlton); Andrew Murray); Cecil Hayter); Gilbert Chester); Robert Murray; Gwyn Evans)	Snowbooks Ltd	edited by George Mann. Includes an introduction by Michael Moorcock	978-1906727413
Fan Fiction	The Case of the Flying Submarine	Anon. (Unknown. Adapted by Mark Hodder)	Blakiana Website	Published online	
Fan Fiction	Pedro Pulls Through!	Anon. (Unknown. Adapted by Mark Hodder)	Blakiana Website	Published online	
Fan Fiction	The Day of the Dragon	Anon. (Unknown. Adapted by Mark Hodder)	Blakiana Website	Published online	
Fan Fiction	The Mystery of Devil's Forest	Anon. (Unknown. Adapted by Mark Hodder)	Blakiana Website	Published online	
Fan Fiction	Sexton Blake Versus Doctor Fu Manchu	Mark Hodder	Blakiana Website	Published online	

== 2010 to 2012 ==
None

== 2013 ==
Publication	Title	Author	Publisher	Notes	ISBN
Novel	The Tower of Silence	Phiroshaw Jamsetjee Chevalier 'Chaiwala' (Gyan Prakash)	HarperCollins Publishers India		978-9350296370
NON-FICTION	The Thrilling Adventures of Sexton Blake	Paul V. Ross	Kaleidoscope Publishing	The story of Sexton Blake from print to television and beyond	978-1900203531
NON-FICTION	The Missing Adventures of Sexton Blake	Paul V. Ross	Kaleidoscope Publishing	The surviving scripts to the Redifussion TV series Sexton Blake 1967–1970.	978-1900203548

== 2014 ==
Publication	Title	Author	Publisher	Notes	ISBN
The Sexton Blake Library	The Silent Thunder Caper; The Wireless Telephone Clue	Mark Hodder; George Hamilton Teed	Obverse Books		978-1909031210

== 2015 to 2017 ==
None

== 2018 ==
The era of the reprints begins. Almost all of the titles below have been previously published in various Sexton Blake publications.

Publication	Title	Author	Publisher	Notes	ISBN
Fan Fiction	Sexton Blake and the Ghost of Otis Maunder	David Friend	Blakiana Website	Published online	N/A
Ebook Anthology	The First Sexton Blake MEGAPACK®: 23 Classic Mystery Cases	Unknown, Various	Wildside Press	A collection of tales drawn from Answers Weekly from 1909 to 1911	N/A
Novel	The Mystery of the Film City	George Hamilton Teed	Stillwoods Edition		978-1988304502
Novel	The Clue of the Four Wigs	George Hamilton Teed	Stillwoods Edition		978-1988304526
Novel	Bribery and Corruption	George Hamilton Teed	Stillwoods Edition	Features Hammerton Palmer	978-1988304595

== 2019 ==
Publication	Title	Author	Publisher	Notes	ISBN
Novel	A Mystery in the Big Woods	George Hamilton Teed	Stillwoods Edition		978-1988304618
Novel	The Sacred Sphere	George Hamilton Teed	Stillwoods Edition	Features Yvonne Cartier, Dr. Huxton Rymer and Prince Wu Ling	978-1988304625
Novel	The Tiger of Canton	George Hamilton Teed	Stillwoods Edition		978-1988304656
Novel	The Crook of Marsden Manor	George Hamilton Teed	Stillwoods Edition		978-1988304663
Novel	The Affair of the Six Ikons	George Hamilton Teed	Stillwoods Edition		978-1988304687
Novel	The Secret of the Coconut Groves	George Hamilton Teed	Stillwoods Edition		978-1988304694
Novel	Under the Eagle's Wing	George Hamilton Teed	Stillwoods Edition		978-1988304724
Novel	The Rogues' Republic	George Hamilton Teed	Stillwoods Edition		978-1988304731
Novel	The Terror of Gold-digger Creek	George Hamilton Teed	Stillwoods Edition		978-1988304717
Novel	The Case of the Pink Macaw	George Hamilton Teed	Stillwoods Edition		978-1988304755
Novel	The Case of the Mummified Hand	George Hamilton Teed	Stillwoods Edition		978-1988304779
Novel	The Pearls of Doom	George Hamilton Teed	Stillwoods Edition		978-1988304786
Novel	The Victim of the Gang	George Hamilton Teed	Stillwoods Edition		978-1988304793
Novel	The Case of the Courtlandt Jewels	George Hamilton Teed	Stillwoods Edition		978-1988304809
Novel	The Temple of Many Visions	George Hamilton Teed	Stillwoods Edition		978-1988304830
Novel	Voodoo Vengeance	George Hamilton Teed	Stillwoods Edition		978-1988304847
Novel	Gangland's Decree	George Hamilton Teed	Stillwoods Edition		978-1988304854
Novel	The Mitcham Murder Mystery	George Hamilton Teed	Stillwoods Edition		978-1988304861
Novel	The Brotherhood of the Yellow Beetle	George Hamilton Teed	Stillwoods Edition		978-1988304878
Novel	The Yellow Tiger	George Hamilton Teed	Stillwoods Edition		978-1988304885
Novel	When Greek Meets Greek	George Hamilton Teed	Stillwoods Edition		978-1988304892
Novel	Bootleg Island	George Hamilton Teed	Stillwoods Edition		978-1988304908
Novel	The Broken Span	George Hamilton Teed	Stillwoods Edition		978-1988304915
Novel	The Lumber Looters	George Hamilton Teed	Stillwoods Edition		978-1988304922
Novel	The Green Rose	George Hamilton Teed	Stillwoods Edition		978-1988304939
Novel	Beyond Reach of the Law	George Hamilton Teed	Stillwoods Edition		978-1988304946
Novel	Dead Men's Shoes	George Hamilton Teed	Stillwoods Edition		978-1988304953
Novel	The Mystery of the Banana Plantation	George Hamilton Teed	Stillwoods Edition		978-1988304960
Novel	Black Spaniard Creek	George Hamilton Teed	Stillwoods Edition		978-1988304977

== 2020 ==
Publication	Title	Author	Publisher	Notes	ISBN
Anthology	Sexton Blake and The Great War	Norman Goddard; Cecil Hayter; William Murray Graydon	Rebellion Publishing	Features: The Case of the Naval Manoeuvres; On War Service; Private Tinker — A. S. C.	978-1781087824
Anthology	Sexton Blake and The Master Crooks	George N. Philips; Jack Lewis; Edwy Searles Brooks	Rebellion Publishing	Features: The Case of the Man in Motley; Prince Pretence; The Wonder-Man's Challenge	978-1781087893
Anthology	Sexton Blake's Allies	W. W. Sayer; Gwyn Evans; George Hamilton Teed	Rebellion Publishing	Features; The Case of the Seventh Key; The Ghost Mobile; The Mystery of Walla-Walla	978-1781087954
Anthology	Sexton Blake: The Early Years: A Collection of 16 Victorian Cases	Patrick Morris; Harry Blyth; Maxwell Scott (John William Staniforth)	ROH Press	Features the early exploits of Sexton Blake and Nelson Lee	978-1987886634
Anthology	Moriarty's Rivals: 14 Female Masterminds	Michael Storm; George Hamilton Teed	ROH Press	Includes tales featuring Mademoiselle Justine de Chevrac and Mademoiselle Yvonne Cartier	978-1987886658
Anthology	Sexton Blake: Yvonne's Vengeance: The Teed Files #1:	George Hamilton Teed	ROH Press	Features: Beyond Reach of Law (1913); When Greek Meets Greek (1913); On the Brink of Ruin (1913); Settling Day (1913); A Minister of the Crown (1913); The Detective Airman (1913); The Missing Guests (1913); By Right of Possession (1913)	978-1998879021
Anthology	Sexton Blake: Rymer and Wu Ling: The Teed Files #2	George Hamilton Teed	ROH Press	Features: The Diamond Dragon (1913); The Great Mining Swindle (1913); The Brotherhood of the Yellow Beetle (1913); The Idol's Spell (1913)	978-1998879038
Anthology	Sexton Blake: Wu Ling Strikes Again: The Teed Files #3	George Hamilton Teed	ROH Press	Features: The Yellow Sphinx (1913); The Black Jewel Case (1913); The Mystery of Walla-Walla (1913); The White Mandarin (1913); The Yellow Octopus (1913)	978-1-987886-72-6
Anthology	Sexton Blake: Cunning Schemes: The Teed Files #4	George Hamilton Teed	ROH Press	Features: The Sacred Sphere (1913); The Grey Domino (1914); The Case of the Radium Patient (1914); The Pirated Cargo (1914)	978-1987886733
Anthology	Sexton Blake: The First Super Villains	Michael Storm	ROH Press	Features: The Mystery of the Egyptian Bonds (1908); The Man from Scotland Yard (1908); The Ghost of Rupert Forbes (1908); In Deadly Grip (1909); The Mervyn Mystery (1909)	978-1987886740
Anthology	Sexton Blake: The Answers Casebook: 75 Short Stories	Various	ROH Press		978-1987886627
Anthology	Sexton Blake: The Complete Miss Death	Robert Murray Graydon	Blakiana		N/A
Novel	Piracy	George Hamilton Teed	Stillwoods Edition		978-1989788028
Novel	The Mystery of the Moving Mountain	George Hamilton Teed	Stillwoods Edition		978-1988304991
Novel	The Case of the Stricken Outpost	George Hamilton Teed	Stillwoods Edition		978-1988304984
Novel	The Yellow Sphinx	George Hamilton Teed	Stillwoods Edition		978 1989788042
Novel	The Case of the Purple Cotton	George Hamilton Teed	Stillwoods Edition		978-1989788059
Novel	Lonely Farm	George Hamilton Teed	Stillwoods Edition		978-1989788066
Novel	The Brute of Saigon	George Hamilton Teed	Stillwoods Edition		978-1989788073
Novel	The Blue God	George Hamilton Teed	Stillwoods Edition		978-1989788097
Novel	Hunted Down	George Hamilton Teed	Stillwoods Edition		978-1989788103
Novel	The Mystery of Walla-Walla	George Hamilton Teed	Stillwoods Edition		978-1989788110
Novel	Doomed to Devil's Island	George Hamilton Teed	Stillwoods Edition		978-1989788127
Novel	The Man from Devil's Island	George Hamilton Teed	Stillwoods Edition		978-1989788134
Novel	Jungle Justice	George Hamilton Teed	Stillwoods Edition		978-1989788141
Novel	Forestalled	George Hamilton Teed	Stillwoods Edition		978-1989788158
Novel	Blackmail	George Hamilton Teed	Stillwoods Edition		978-1989788165
Novel	Shanghaied	George Hamilton Teed	Stillwoods Edition		978-1989788172
Novel	Sinister Mill	George Hamilton Teed	Stillwoods Edition		978-1989788189
Novel	The Shuttered Room	George Hamilton Teed	Stillwoods Edition		978-1989788219
Novel	Pearls of Peril	George Hamilton Teed	Stillwoods Edition		978-1989788226
Novel	Planned From Paris	George Hamilton Teed	Stillwoods Edition		978-1989788233

== 2021 ==
Publication	Title	Author	Publisher	Notes	ISBN
Anthology	The Return of Sexton Blake	Mark Hodder; Chris Lowder; Mike Dorey; Karl Stock; George Mann; Jimmy Broxton; Michael Storm (E. Sempill); W. W. Sayer.	Rebellion Publishing		Kindle N/A
Anthology	Sexton Blake on the Home Front	Anthony Parsons; John Drummond (John Newton Chance); Mark Hodder	Rebellion Publishing	Features: The Man From Occupied France; The House on the Hill	978-1781088029
Anthology	Sexton Blake's New Order	Rex Dolphin; Jack Trevor Story; Martin Thomas (Thomas Martin); Mark Hodder	Rebellion Publishing	Features: The World Shakers; The Big Steal; Bred to Kill	978-1781088074
Anthology	The Complete Wonder-Man, Vol. 1	Edwy Searles Brooks	Blakiana	Features: Waldo the Wonder-man; The Clue of the Five Hairs; The Shanghaied Detective; The Case of the Stacey Rubies	979-8706064136
Anthology	The Complete Wonder-Man, Vol. 2	Edwy Searles Brooks	Blakiana		979-8708874108
Anthology	Sexton Blake: The Complete Dr. Satira, Volume 1	Robert Murray Graydon	Blakiana		979-8715235565
Anthology	Sexton Blake: The Complete Dr. Satira, Volume 2	Robert Murray Graydon	Blakiana		979-8721251573
Anthology	Sexton Blake: The Complete Dr. Satira, Volume 3	Robert Murray Graydon	Blakiana		979-8721251573
Anthology	Sexton Blake: The Master Criminals	Robert Murray Graydon, Andrew Nicholas Murray, George Hamilton Teed, Maxwell Scott, Jack Lewis, Anthony Skene, Edwy Searles Brooks, John William Bobin	ROH Press		978-1987886771
Anthology	Sexton Blake: Friends and Allies	William Murray Graydon; William Shaw Rae; William Joseph Lomax; Cecil Hayter; Andrew Nicholas Murray; Gwyn Evans; Robert Murray Graydon	ROH Press		978-1987886757
Anthology	Sexton Blake: The Storm Files	Michael Storm (E. Sempill)	ROH Press		978-1987886801
Anthology	Sexton Blake: The Plummer Files	Michael Storm (E. Sempill), Norman Goddard	ROH Press		978-1987886832
Anthology	Sexton Blake: The Kew Files	Andrew Nicholas Murray	ROH Press	Features: The Aylesbury Square Mystery; Foiled by Sexton Blake; The Case of the Motor-Cyclist; Tinker's Terrible Test; The Blackmailer's Secret; The Mystery of the Monastery; The Death Cylinder.	978-1987886788
Anthology	Sexton Blake & Nelson Lee	Edwy Searles Brooks	ROH Press		978-1987886795
Anthology	Sexton Blake: The Bat Files: The Criminals' Confederation Series #1	Robert Murray Graydon	ROH Press	Features: The Hidden Hand; A Case of Arson; The Mystery of Cell Six; The Two Impersonators; The Mysterious Mr. Reece.	978-1987886849
Anthology	Sexton Blake: The Bat Files #2: The Criminals' Confederation Series #2	Robert Murray Graydon	ROH Press	Features: The Vanished Man; The Bogus Bat; The Mystery of the Vlao Vase; A Mid-Ocean Mystery; The Lost Letter.	978-1987886856
Anthology	Sexton Blake: The Bat Files #3: The Criminals' Confederation Series #3	Robert Murray Graydon	ROH Press		978-1987886863
Anthology	Sexton Blake: The Bat Files #4: The Criminals' Confederation Series #4	Robert Murray Graydon	ROH Press		978-1987886870
Anthology	Sexton Blake: Confederation Rising: The Criminals' Confederation Series #5	Robert Murray Graydon	ROH Press		978-1987886887
Anthology	Sexton Blake: The Sinister Island Saga: The Criminals' Confederation Series #6	Robert Murray Graydon	ROH Press		978-1987886894
Novel	Lost in the Legion	George Hamilton Teed	Stillwoods Edition		978-1989788240
Novel	Revolt	George Hamilton Teed	Stillwoods Edition		978-1989788257
Novel	The Twilight Feather Case	George Hamilton Teed	Stillwoods Edition		978-1989788271
Novel	Sexton Blake in Manchuria	George Hamilton Teed	Stillwoods Edition		9781989788264
Novel	Presumed Dead	George Hamilton Teed	Stillwoods Edition		978-1989788295
Novel	The Secret Hand	George Hamilton Teed	Stillwoods Edition		978-1989788196
Novel	The Case of The Crimson Terror	George Hamilton Teed	Stillwoods Edition		978-1989788301
Novel	The Invisible Ray	George Hamilton Teed	Stillwoods Edition		978-1989788332
Novel	A Mystery of the Mountains	George Hamilton Teed	Stillwoods Edition		978-1989788349
Novel	Tinker's Secret	George Hamilton Teed	Stillwoods Edition		978-1989788356
Novel	The Loyalty of Nirvana	George Hamilton Teed	Stillwoods Edition		978-1989788363
Novel	The Case of the Six Rubber Balls	George Hamilton Teed	Stillwoods Edition		978-1989788370
Novel	At the Full of the Moon	George Hamilton Teed	Stillwoods Edition		978-1989788387
Novel	The Voodoo Curse	George Hamilton Teed	Stillwoods Edition		978-1989788394
Novel	The Adventure of the Giant Bean	George Hamilton Teed	Stillwoods Edition		978-1989788400
Novel	The Soap Salvors	George Hamilton Teed	Stillwoods Edition		978-1989788417
Novel	The Detective Airman	George Hamilton Teed	Stillwoods Edition		9781989788424

== 2022 ==
Publication	Title	Author	Publisher	Notes	ISBN
Anthology	Sexton Blake: The Claire Delisle Files	Francis Addington Symonds	ROH Press	Features: The Golden Casket; The Raven's Prey; The Case of the Chinese Hypnotist; The Affair of the Exiled Princess; The Raven and the Ruby; The Valley of Fear.	978-1987886900
Anthology	Sexton Blake: Yvonne Joins the Fight: The Criminals' Confederation Series #7	Robert Murray Graydon	ROH Press		978-1987886917
Anthology	Sexton Blake: Beware the Shadow: The Criminals' Confederation Series #8	Robert Murray Graydon	ROH Press		978-1987886924
Anthology	Sexton Blake: Plots and Intrigues: The Criminals' Confederation Series #9	Robert Murray Graydon	ROH Press		978-1987886931
Anthology	Sexton Blake: Reversals of Fortune: The Criminals' Confederation Series #10	Robert Murray Graydon	ROH Press		978-1987886948
Anthology	Sexton Blake: The Rival Presidents: The Criminals' Confederation Series #11	Robert Murray Graydon	ROH Press		978-1987886955
Anthology	Sexton Blake: Reece's Republic: The Criminals' Confederation Series #12	Robert Murray Graydon	ROH Press		978-1987886962
Anthology	Sexton Blake: Twists in the Trail: The Criminals' Confederation Series #13	Robert Murray Graydon; H H Clifford Gibbons	ROH Press		978-1987886979
Anthology	Sexton Blake: Final Curtain: The Criminals' Confederation Series #14	Robert Murray Graydon; H H Clifford Gibbons	ROH Press	Features: North of 70; Reece's Revenge; The Marriage of Jason Reece; Dirk Dolland's Crime; The Great Round-Up!	978-1987886986
Anthology	Sexton Blake: The First Cases	Maxwell Scott (John William Staniforth); William Shaw Rae; William Stanhope Sprigg	ROH Press	Features: How Sexton Blake Won His Spurs (1896); Sexton Blake's First Case (1905) and the 20-part serial The Clique of Death (1905).	978-1988304526
Anthology	Sexton Blake: Palmer and Beauremon The Teed Files #5	George Hamilton Teed	ROH Press	Features: Yvonne Cartier, Hammerton Palmer, The Council of Eleven; Includes: The Death Club (1914); The Council of Eleven (1914); The Lost King (1914); The Mountaineer's Secret (1914); A Fight for an Earldom (1914)	978-1987886412
Novel	A Soldier and a Man	George Hamilton Teed	Stillwoods Edition		978-1989788868
Novel	The Green Portfolio	George Hamilton Teed	Stillwoods Edition		978-1989788875
Novel	The Affair of the Rotten Rails	George Hamilton Teed	Stillwoods Edition		978-1989788899
Novel	The Chocolate King Mystery	George Hamilton Teed	Stillwoods Edition		978-1989788912
Novel	Sexton Blake's Xmas Truce	George Hamilton Teed	Stillwoods Edition		978-1989788929
Novel	The Affair of the Missing Financier	George Hamilton Teed	Stillwoods Edition		978-1989788936
Novel	The Treasure of the 'Isabella'	George Hamilton Teed	Stillwoods Edition		978-1989788974
Novel	The Secret of the Strong Room	George Hamilton Teed	Stillwoods Edition		978-1989788981
Novel	The Case of the Captive Emperor	George Hamilton Teed	Stillwoods Edition		978-1989788998
Novel	The Gang Girl	George Hamilton Teed	Stillwoods Edition		978-1998819003
Novel	Spanish Gold	George Hamilton Teed	Stillwoods Edition		978-1998819010
Novel	Doomed Ships	George Hamilton Teed	Stillwoods Edition		978-1998819034
Novel	Yellow Guile	George Hamilton Teed	Stillwoods Edition		978-1998819041
Novel	Prisoner of the Harem	George Hamilton Teed	Stillwoods Edition		978-1998819058
Novel	The Adventure of the Green Imps	George Hamilton Teed	Stillwoods Edition		978-1998819065
Novel	The Mystery of Room 11	George Hamilton Teed	Stillwoods Edition		978-1998819072
Novel	The Legion of the Lost	George Hamilton Teed	Stillwoods Edition		978-1998819089
Novel	The Hawk of the Peak	George Hamilton Teed	Stillwoods Edition		978-1998819096

== 2023 ==
Publication	Title	Author	Publisher	Notes	ISBN
Novel	Caribbean Crisis & Voodoo Island	Michael Moorcock; Mark Hodder	Rebellion Publishing		978-1837860340
Novel	They Shall Repay!	George Hamilton Teed	Stillwoods Edition	Features Mademoiselle Roxane. First published in 1930. The first tale in the Roxanne saga.	978-1998819126
Novel	The Crimson Pearl	George Hamilton Teed	Stillwoods Edition	Features Dr. Huxton Rymer, the Brotherhood of the yellow Beetle and Mademoiselle Yvonne.	978-1998819102
Novel	The Slave of the Thieves' Market	George Hamilton Teed	Stillwoods Edition	Features Wu Ling	978-1998819119
Novel	The Diamond Dragon	George Hamilton Teed	Stillwoods Edition	Features Dr. Huxton Rymer	978-1998819157
Novel	Sexton Blake – Pirate	George Hamilton Teed	Stillwoods Edition	Features Dr. Huxton Rymer.	978-1998819133
Novel	The Case of the Indian Fakir	George Hamilton Teed	Stillwoods Edition	Features Dr. Huxton Rymer.	978-1998819171
Novel	The Case of the 'Frisco Leper	George Hamilton Teed	Stillwoods Edition	Features Dr. Huxton Rymer.	978-1998819164
Novel	The Treasure of Tortoise Island	George Hamilton Teed	Stillwoods Edition	Features Dr. Huxton Rymer.	978-1998819140
Novel	The Council of Eleven	George Hamilton Teed	Stillwoods Edition	Features the Council of Eleven.	978-1998819232
Novel	Tinker—Wireless Operator	George Hamilton Teed	Stillwoods Edition	Features Tinker.	978-1998819225
Novel	The Secret of the Bottle	George Hamilton Teed	Stillwoods Edition	Features The Black Eagle	978-1998819249
Novel	The Black Eagle	George Hamilton Teed	Stillwoods Edition	Features The Black Eagle.	978-1998819201
Novel	The Secret of the Thieves' Kitchen	George Hamilton Teed	Stillwoods Edition	Features Dr. Huxton Rymer	978-1998819218
Novel	The Case of Colton's Mule	George Hamilton Teed	Stillwoods Edition	Features George Marsden Plummer.	978-1998819270
Novel	The Mystery of the Seine	George Hamilton Teed	Stillwoods Edition	Features The Three Musketeers.	978-1998819294
Novel	The Black Abbot of Cheng-tu	George Hamilton Teed	Stillwoods Edition	Features The Black Abbot of Cheng-tu. A 19-part serial published in 1927.	978-1998819287
Anthology	Sexton Blake: Dawn of the Great War	George Hamilton Teed	ROH Press	Features: Mademoiselle Yvonne Cartier, Dr. Huxton Rymer, The Council of Eleven, The Brotherhood of the Yellow Beetle. Includes The Crimson Pearl (1914); The Sweater's Punishment (1914); The Refugee (1914); The Great Cigarette Mystery (1914); A Voice from the Dead (1914)	978-1998879076
Anthology	Sexton Blake: Spy Stories	W.W. Sayer	ROH Press	Features the debut tales of spies Granite Grant and Mademoiselle Julie. Includes: The Case of the King's Spy (1920); The Case of the Strange Wireless Message (1920); The Mystery of the Turkish Agreement (1920)	978-1998879090
Anthology	Sexton Blake: The Carlac Files	Andrew Nicholas Murray	ROH Press	Features the first tales of master criminal Count Ivor Carlac. Includes: The Regent Street Robbery (1912); The Case of the Borgia Bronze (1912); The Opium Smugglers (1912); Carlac: Gun-Runner (1912)	978-1998879106
Anthology	Sexton Blake: The Three Murrays	Andrew Nicholas Murray; Robert Murray Graydon; William Murray Graydon	ROH Press	Features four tales: The Masquerader (1919); The Case of the Suppressed Will (1916); The Black Bat (1917); The Mystery of the SS Olympic (1920)	978-1998879120
Anthology	Sexton Blake: Schooldays #1	Cecil Hayter	ROH Press	Features Sexton Blake at School. The complete 25-part 1908 serial. The origins of Sexton Blake. Tells of his days at St Anne's College and his first meeting with Spots Losely.	978-1998879137
Anthology	Sexton Blake: Schooldays #2	Cecil Hayter	ROH Press	Features Sexton Blake in the Sixth. The complete 16-part 1908 serial. The origins of Sexton Blake. His adventures at St. Anne's College continue.	978-1998879144
Anthology	Sexton Blake: Schooldays #3	Cecil Hayter	ROH Press	Features Sexton Blake at Oxford. The complete 20-part 1908-09 serial. Chronicles Sexton Blake's first case. Tells of how he met Tinker.	978-1998879151

== 2024 ==
Publication	Title	Author	Publisher	Notes	ISBN
Novel	The Adventure of the Two Devils	George Hamilton Teed	Stillwoods Edition	Features Nirvana and Mademoiselle Yvonne. First published in 1926.	978-1998819331
Anthology	Sexton Blake: Schemes and Scandals	George Hamilton Teed	ROH Press	Features Mademoiselle Yvonne Cartier, Dr. Huxton Rymer, and The Council of Eleven. Includes: A Soldier—And a Man (1914); The German Colony (1915); The Mystery of the Banana Plantation (1915); The Conniston Diamonds (1915) and The Army Contract Scandal (1915).	978-1998879182
Anthology	Sexton Blake: Spy Stories #2	W. W. Sayer	ROH Press	Features Granite Grant and Mademoiselle Julie. Includes: The Mystery of the Living Shadow (1920); The Mystery Box (1920) and The Secret of the Frozen North (1921).	978-1998879205
Anthology	Sexton Blake: The Carlac Files #2	Andrew Nicholas Murray	ROH Press	Features the master criminal Count Ivor Carlac. Includes: The Mad Millionaire (1912); The Great Boxing Fraud (1913); The Ten Millionaires (1913); The Case of the Emigrant Slaves (1913)	978-1998879243
Anthology	Sexton Blake: The Carlac Files #3	Andrew Nicholas Murray	ROH Press	Features the last of the master criminal Count Ivor Carlac's solo tales. Includes: A Rogue at Large (1913); The Wandering Baronet (1913); The Sugar Planter’s Secret (1913); The Case of the Suffragette Raid (1913); The Ex-Convict’s Secret (1913)	978-1998879267
Anthology	Sexton Blake: From the Shadows	George Hamilton Teed	ROH Press	Features Prince Wu Ling, Hammerton Palmer, and The Council of Eleven. Includes: The Case of the Poisoned Telephones (1915); The Vengeance of the Eleven (1915); The Prize Ship (1915); The Quest of the Grey Panther (1915). Also includes the Nelson Lee tale, The Black Wolf (1915).	978-1998879281
Anthology	Sexton Blake: Ploys and Plunder	George Hamilton Teed	ROH Press	Features Yvonne Cartier, Hammerton Palmer, Dr. Huxton Rymer and The Council of Eleven. Includes: Scoundrels All (1915); The Secret of Kilchester Towers (1915); Bribery and Corruption! (1915); Sexton Blake Pirate (1915). Also includes the Nelson Lee tale, The Secret of the Swamp (1915).	978-1998879311
Anthology	Sexton Blake: Tigers and Traitors	George Hamilton Teed	ROH Press	Features Prince Wu Ling, Yvonne Cartier, and Dr. Huxton Rymer. Includes: The Case of the Cabinet Minister (1915); The Case of the ’Frisco Leper (1915); The Yellow Tiger (1915); The Lust of Gold (1914); The Bushranger’s Secret (1914); The Pearl of Samu (1914) and The Lone Horseman (1915); Also includes the Nelson Lee tale, Edges of Steel (1915).	978-1998879335
Anthology	Sexton Blake: Yvonne's Island Colony	George Hamilton Teed	ROH Press	Features Yvonne Cartier, Baron de Beauremon. Includes: The Man with the Scarred Neck (1915); Fugitives from Justice (1915); At the Turn of the Hou (1916); The Island of Fear (1916). Also includes the Nelson Lee tale, The Case of the Tube of Radium (1915).	978-1998879359
Anthology	Sexton Blake: Rymer at Large	George Hamilton Teed	ROH Press	Features Dr. Huxton Rymer and The Council of Eleven. Includes: The Two Mysteries (1916) and 14 of Rymer's solo adventures.	978-1998879373

== 2025 ==
Publication	Title	Author	Publisher	Notes	ISBN
Anthology	Sexton Blake: Kew and Carlac #1	Andrew Nicholas Murray	ROH Press	Features Professor Francis Kew and Count Ivor Carlac. Includes: Ill-Gotten Gains (1915); The Rajah’s Revenge (1915); Victims of Villainy (1916).	978-1987886719
Anthology	Sexton Blake: Zenith's Final Curtain	Anthony Skene; Michael Moorcock (Introduction)	ROH Press	Features Zenith the Albino. Includes: The White Trinity (1936); The Secret of the Six Locks (1936) and The Clue in the Blue Sampler (1936). Monsieur Zenith (1936), Zenith's solo novel, and The Affair of the Bronze Basilisk (1943).	978-1998879380
Anthology	Sexton Blake: Dawn of a Legend	William Murray Graydon; William Joseph Lomax; William Stanhope Sprigg; Ernest Adolphus Treeton; W. O. G. Lofts (Introduction)	ROH Press	Features the detective stories that launched one of popular fiction’s most enduring heroes: Sexton Blake. Includes: Cunning Against Skill (1904); The Mystery of Hilton Royal (1904); Sexton Blake's First Case (1905); From Clue to Climax (1905) and The Ocean Detective (1905).	978-1998879427

== 2026 ==
Publication	Title	Author	Publisher	Notes	ISBN
Anthology	Sexton Blake: Kew and Carlac #2	Andrew Nicholas Murray	ROH Press	Features Professor Francis Kew and Count Ivor Carlac. Includes: His Excellency’s Secret (1916); The Secret of Draker’s Folly (1916); The Catspaw (1917).	978-1998879502
Anthology	Sexton Blake: The Double Four	Gwyn Evans	ROH Press	Introducing King Karl and The Double Four. Also featuring Splash Page, Ruff Hanson, and Detective-Inspector Coutts. Includes: The Problem of the Double Four (1927); Duped by the Double Four (1927); The Gallows Mystery (1927); The Return of Sexton Blake (1927); The Mystery of the Ivory Beam (1927); The Adventure of the Vanishing Shop (1927)	978-1998879533
Anthology	Sexton Blake: Milestones	Norman Goddard; Michael Storm; Cecil Hayter	ROH Press	Introducing Lady Molly, Marston Hume and Justine de Chevrac	978-1998879595
Anthology	Sexton Blake: The Coster King	E. W. Alais	ROH Press	Introducing Henry Higgins, Fighting Jess, Josiah Pounce, and Jospeh Humm "the Human Sleuth-Hound" Includes; Butler and Page (1906); The Coster King (1907)	978-1998879618
