= Monsieur Zenith =

- First appearance: A Duel to the Death (Union Jack #837, 1919)
- Last appearance: The Affair of the Bronze Basilisk (The Sexton Blake Library #49, 1943
- Created by: Anthony Skene

In-universe information
- Species: Human
- Gender: Male
- Occupation: Gentleman thief
- Nationality: Romanian

Monsieur Zenith the Albino is a fictional character who appeared as a recurring antagonist in the Sexton Blake detective series. Created by writer Anthony Skene in 1919, Zenith became one of Blake's most notable and popular adversaries. Originally Romanian nobility living in exile, he is characterized by his albinism, world-weary demeanor, and gentleman thief persona.

Immediately recognizable by his crimson-colored eyes and white hair, Zenith is portrayed as an aristocratic criminal who operates with a strict code of honor. His character is distinguished by his formal attire, typically appearing in evening dress, and his habit of smoking opium-laced cigarettes. One of these cigarettes, marked with a crimson ring, is described as containing a lethal dose, which Zenith keeps as a last resort to avoid imprisonment.

Unlike many traditional antagonists, Zenith's motivation stems not from greed but from a profound ennui that can only be relieved through opium, danger, and adventure. His relationship with Sexton Blake is marked by sportsmanship rather than animosity, treating their encounters as an intellectual game. The character's background is deliberately shrouded in mystery, though he is often referred to as "Excellency" and wears foreign orders of distinction.

== Literary influence and legacy ==
Zenith's character, influenced by the anti-heroes of Gothic fiction and master villains like Fantômas, went on to inspire other literary works. Most notably, he was an important influence in Michael Moorcock's creation of the fantasy character Elric of Melniboné. Moorcock later wrote an introduction to the re-publication of Skene's novel, Monsieur Zenith: The Albino (ISBN 0861301099), and incorporated the character into his own work The Metatemporal Detective.

== Modern revival ==
In 2012, Obverse Books published Zenith Lives!: Tales of M.Zenith, the Albino, a collection of Zenith short stories edited by Stuart Douglas. The anthology, Book 4 of The Obverse Quarterly, featured contributions from several authors: Stuart Douglas, Sexton Blake scholar Mark Hodder, Paul Magrs, George Mann (a story set in his steampunk universe which also features a crossover character from Mann's Doctor Who novel, Paradox Lost), and Michael Moorcock (featuring Seaton Begg, an alternate version of Sexton Blake).

== Bibliography: The Sexton Blake Era ==
1. A Duel to the Death (Union Jack #837, 1919)
2. The Tenth Case (Union Jack #842, 1919)
3. The Case of the Man in Motley (Union Jack #844, 1919)
4. The League of the Cobblers' Last (Union Jack #847, 1920)
5. The Beggars' Hotel (Union Jack #856, 1920)
6. The Five Clues (Union Jack #867, 1920)
7. The Case of the Four Statues (Union Jack #871, 1920)
8. The Death Spider (Union Jack #875, 1920)
9. The Case of the Crystal Gazer (Union Jack #889, 1920)
10. The Strange Case of the Elsingham Legend (Union Jack #894, 1920)
11. The Case of the Toxic Tulips (Union Jack #898, 1920)
12. The Case of the Thirteenth Bowl (Union Jack #919, 1921)
13. The Return of Zenith the Albino (Union Jack #928, 1921)
14. The Roumanian Envoy (The Sexton Blake Library #156, 1921)
15. The 'Corner' in Quinine (Union Jack #937, 1921)
16. The Case of the Five L's (Union Jack #954, 1922)
17. Threatened by Three (Union Jack #956, 1922)
18. The Affair of the Sacred Fire (Union Jack #966, 1922)
19. In League Against Him (Union Jack #969, 1922)
20. The Case of the Atwell Aircraft Company (Union Jack #996, 1922)
21. The Albino's Double (The Sexton Blake Library #255, 1922)
22. The Thousandth Chance (Union Jack #1,000, 1922)
23. On Secret Service (Union Jack #1,013, 1923)
24. The Case of the Crimson Curtain (Union Jack #1,022, 1923)
25. Plague! (Union Jack #1,025, 1923)!
26. X-ine, or; The Case of the Green Crystals (Union Jack #1,038, 1923)
27. The Living Mask, or; Zenith's Masquerade (Union Jack #1,044, 1923)
28. The Train of Tragedy (Union Jack #1,065, 1924)
29. The Strange Case of the Jig-saw Puzzle (Union Jack #1,082, 1924)
30. The Man in Steel (Union Jack #1,091, 1924)
31. The Wizard of Wurtz (Union Jack #1,098, 1924)
32. The Amazing Affair of the Renegade Prince (The Sexton Blake Library #370, 1925)
33. Absolute Authority (Union Jack #1,116, 1925)
34. A Problem of Proof (Union Jack #1,128, 1925)
35. The Strange Affair of the Mantel Register Grate (Union Jack #1,139, 1925)..
36. The Mystery of the Swanley Viaduct (The Sexton Blake Library, 2nd series, #13, 1925)
37. The Affair of the Crumpled Paper (Union Jack #1,160, 1926)
38. Threads of Fate (Union Jack #1,162, 1926)
39. The Plant of Prey (Union Jack #1,171, 1926)
40. Zenith Declares War (Union Jack #1,174, 1926)
41. The Mystery of the Masked Rider (Union Jack #1,178, 1926)
42. A Mystery in Motley (Union Jack #1,182, 1926)
43. The Mystery of the Mechanical Men (Union Jack #1,188, 1926)
44. The Affair of the Were-Wolf (Union Jack #1,216, 1927)
45. The Trail of the Nameless Three (Union Jack #1,229, 1927)
46. The Case of the Friend of May Cubitt (Union Jack #1,240, 1927)
47. The Case of the Grey Envelope (Union Jack #1,276, 1928)
48. The Case of the Shot P.C. (The Sexton Blake Library 2nd series, #155, 1928)
49. The Affair of the Great Seal (Union Jack #1,299, 1928)
50. The Problem of the Broken Stick (Union Jack #1,310, 1928)
51. The Case of the Crook M.P. (The Sexton Blake Library 2nd series, #173, 1929)
52. The Humber Woodyard Mystery (Union Jack #1,325, 1929)
53. The Man Who Squealed (The Sexton Blake Library 2nd series, #188, 1929)
54. The Case of the Fifth Man (Union Jack #1,339, 1929)0
55. The Radium Profiteer (The Sexton Blake Library 2nd series, #206, 1929)
56. Gangsters' Gold (Union Jack #1,372, 1930)
57. The Gangster's Revenge (The Sexton Blake Library 2nd series, #233, 1930)
58. The Crook's Accomplice (The Sexton Blake Library 2nd series, #246, 1930)
59. Killers' Creed (Union Jack #1,402, 1930)
60. Green Men (Union Jack #1,412, 1930)
61. Crooks' Warning (Union Jack #1,419, 1930)
62. Night Birds (Union Jack #1,420, 1932)
63. The Vault of Doom (The Sexton Blake Library 2nd series, #281, 1931)
64. The Death of Four (The Sexton Blake Library 2nd series, #291, 1931)
65. The Crook Crusaders (Union Jack #1,486, 1932)
66. The Fatal Mascot (The Sexton Blake Library 2nd series, #331, 1932)
67. The Rain Maker (Union Jack #1,505, 1932)
68. The Gold Maker (Union Jack #1,510, 1932)
69. The Derelict House (The Sexton Blake Library 2nd series, #368, 1933)
70. The Box of Ho Sen (Detective Weekly #8, 1933)
71. The Seven Dead Matches Mystery (Detective Weekly #14, 1933)
72. Seeds of Sleep (Detective Weekly #21, 1933)
73. The Crime Zone (Detective Weekly #26, 1933)
74. The Case of the Shuttered Room (Detective Weekly #53, 1934)
75. The Clue of the Corsican Collar (Detective Weekly #71, 1934)
76. The Blinding Clue (Detective Weekly #87, 1934)
77. The Mystery of the Swanley Viaduct, The Sexton Blake Library · 2nd series · #582, 1937) (Reprint)
78. The Case of the Crook Oil King (Detective Weekly #267, 1938) (Reprint)
79. Four to Die! (Detective Weekly #314, 1939) (Reprint)
80. Zenith the Albino (Detective Weekly #323, 1939) (Reprint)
81. The Agony Ad' Mystery (Detective Weekly #334, 1939) (Reprint)
82. The Were-Wolf Mystery (Detective Weekly #343, 1939) (Reprint)
83. The Case of the Grey Envelope (Detective Weekly #372, 1940) (Reprint)
84. The Case of the Shot PC (Sexton Blake Library #703, 1940) (Reprint)
85. The Affair of the Bronze Basilisk (The Sexton Blake Library 3rd series, #49, 1943)

== Bibliography: Solo Appearances ==
The White Trinity (Detective Weekly #152, 1936)
The Secret of the Six Locks (Detective Weekly #166, 1936)
The Clue in the Blue Sampler (Detective Weekly #177, 1936)
Monsieur Zenith (Novel, 1936)

== Other uses ==
- Zenith is mentioned (but does not appear) in the BBC serial Sexton Blake and the Demon God.
- Zenith is briefly mentioned in Kim Newman's novel Dracula Cha Cha Cha as a possible leader of anti-vampire murders in Rome.
- Zenith (identified with Elric) appears in Alan Moore and Kevin O'Neill's The League of Extraordinary Gentlemen: Black Dossier as a member of Les Hommes Mystérieux, a French version of Britain's League.
- Zenith is the eponymous albino who opposes Sherlock Holmes and John Watson in The Albino's Treasure by Stuart Douglas, part of Titan Publishing's Further Adventures of Sherlock Holmes series of pastiche novels.
