= Story Paper Collectors' Digest =

- Editor: Herbert Leckenby (1946-1959), Eric Fayne (1959-1987), Mary Cadogan (1987-2007)
- Categories: Journal
- Frequency: Monthly
- First issue: 1946; 79 years ago
- Final issue: 2004
- Country: United Kingdom
- Language: English

Story Paper Collectors' Digest was a journal published from November 1946 until May 2005, and with special intermittent issues continuing on until late 2007. It was created by Herbert Leckenby. With articles on story papers, it heavily featured the work of Charles Hamilton, Edwy Searles Brooks and the tales of detectives Sexton Blake and Nelson Lee. It was published monthly until 2004. The editors were Herbert Leckenby until his death in October 1959, then Eric Fayne until January 1987 when he retired as editor, then Mary Cadogan.

Contributors included Roger Jenkins, Gerald Allison, Breeze Bentley, Jim Cook, Jack Wood, Laurie Sutton, Josie and Len Packman, Bob Whiter, Jack Overhill, W. O. G. Lofts, and the respective editors.

A Collectors' Digest Annual appeared, under the same editors, from 1947 onwards. It contained more substantial material.

== See also ==
- British comics
- Just William
- Penny dreadful
- Sexton Blake
- Story paper
- The Boys' Friend
- The Gem
- The Sexton Blake Library
- The Nelson Lee Library
- The Magnet
