= The Albino's Treasure =

2015 novel by Stuart Douglas

- Book cover
- Author: Stuart Douglas
- Language: English
- Series: The Further Adventures of Sherlock Holmes
- Genre: Mystery
- Published: 15 May 2015 (Titan Books)
- Publication place: United Kingdom
- Media type: Novel
- Pages: 272
- ISBN: 9781783293124 (first edition)

The Albino's Treasure is a mystery pastiche novel written by Stuart Douglas, featuring Sherlock Holmes and Dr. John Watson up against Monsieur Zenith from the Sexton Blake novels.

Titan Books printed the book in 2015, as part of its Further Adventures of Sherlock Holmes series, which collects a number of noted Holmesian pastiches.

== Plot ==
What starts out as anarchists defacing a painting of the Prime Minister in the National Portrait Gallery turns into a battle of wits between Holmes and the criminal mastermind known as Monsieur Zenith the Albino that span from forged artwork to the destruction of the British monarchy itself.

== Reception ==
Publishers Weekly were positive, saying 'Douglas does a good job of giving Watson opportunities to display his sense of humor, while preserving Holmes's sharper edges.' The British Fantasy Society said 'The use of Holmes's deductive prowess is used effectively, and the Victorian London setting is described well.'

== See also ==
- Sherlock Holmes pastiches
