= Robert Murray Graydon =

British writer (1890–1937)

- Robert Murray Graydon, 1913, Boys' Realm Christmas Issue
- Born: 20 January 1890; Harrisburg, Pennsylvania, USA
- Died: 4 December 1937 (aged 47); Brighton, Sussex, England
- Occupation: Writer
- Writing career
- Pen name: Robert Murray, Murray Hamilton, Murray Roberts.
- Period: 1907 – 1937
- Genres: Detective fiction, Adventure fiction

Robert Murray Graydon (1890 – 1937) was a British novelist who also wrote under the pen-names Robert Murray, Murray Hamilton, and Murray Roberts. He is best remembered for his Sexton Blake stories featuring the Criminals' Confederation, a global criminal organisation that featured prominently in the Blake magazines from 1916 to the 1930s.

== Life and work ==
Robert Murray Graydon was born in Harrisburg, Dauphin, Pennsylvania, the son of author William Murray Graydon and Pearl Balsley. In 1896 the family moved to England and landed in Liverpool in March of that year. Details are a little vague in terms of their movements during their early stay in the UK. 1901 saw the family living in Horses Head, Upton (Norfolk). The 1911 Census reported that they had moved to the Fulton District in London.

Robert took to writing from a very young age. He wrote his first story in a school exercise book and had it accepted for publication in Chums in 1907 when he was seventeen. By 1913 he was an established story paper author, writing school serials for The Boys' Realm. In 1916 he published his first Sexton Blake tale, The Detective's Ordeal, in Union Jack #675. He married Victoria Honoria Septumus Neat in 1917 in Lambeth, London. They subsequently had four children, two boys and two girls. The family moved from London to Brighton in 1927. Robert Murray Graydon died of bowel cancer in 1937.

== Sexton Blake ==
Like his father, Robert Murray Graydon wrote a large number of Sexton Blake tales. The elder Graydon was one of the most prolific Blake authors, and created Blake's wise and ferocious bloodhound Pedro and landlady Mrs. Bardell. It was Robert, however, who arguably became the more popular of the two, thanks to the creation of some of Sexton Blake's most beloved foes. These include master criminals Mr. Reece, Paul Cynos and Doctor Satira. But his greatest creation was the Criminals' Confederation, a global criminal organisation that formed the backbone of Blake's Golden age. There were seventy stories in the first run of tales from 1916 to 1926 that featured in the Union Jack and the Sexton Blake Library. The tales were so popular they were revised and reissued in the late 1920s and early 1930s.

=== The Criminals' Confederation: Original Series ===
1. The Hidden Hand (Union Jack #680, 1916)
2. A Case of Arson (Union Jack #698, 1917)
3. The Two Impersonators (Union Jack #709, 1917)
4. The Mysterious Mr. Reece (The Sexton Blake Library 1st series #41, 1917)
5. The Vanished Man (Union Jack #747, 1918)
6. The Bogus Bat (Union Jack #751, 1918)
7. The Mystery of the Vlao Vase (Union Jack #753, 1918)
8. A Mid-Ocean Mystery (Union Jack #763, 1918)
9. The Masquerader (Sexton Blake Library 1st series #85, 1919)
10. The Lost Letter (Union Jack #767, 1918)
11. The Case of the Clubfooted Man (Union Jack #775, 1918)
12. The Vanished Police (Union Jack #778, 1918)
13. Suspended From Duty (Union Jack #779, 1918)
14. The Steel Claw (Union Jack #782, 1918)
15. The Silent Partner (Union Jack #787, 1918)
16. The Amazing Affair at Clanmere Mansions (Union Jack #790, 1918)
17. Dirk Dolland's Redemption (Union Jack #791, 1918)
18. The Clue of the Cuff Link (Union Jack #797, 1919)
19. The Case of the Black Feather (Union Jack #802, 1919)
20. The Missing Crooks (Union Jack #806, 1919)
21. Tracked by Wireless (Union Jack #807, 1919)
22. Held As Hostage (Union Jack #808, 1919)
23. The White Liner (Union Jack #812, 1919)
24. The Stolen Yacht (Union Jack #816, 1919)
25. Dirk Dolland's Ordeal (Union Jack #820, 1919)
26. The Diamond of Disaster (Union Jack #824, 1919)
27. Sinister Island (Union Jack #829, 1919)
28. The Man from the Sea (Union Jack #830, 1919)
29. The Trail in the Sand (Union Jack #838, 1919)
30. Mr. Smith of London (Union Jack #841, 1919)
31. The Informer (Union Jack #858, 1920)
32. The Hidden Headquarters (Union Jack #860, 1920)
33. The New President (Union Jack #868, 1920)
34. Dirk Dolland's Dilemma (Union Jack #869, 1920)
35. The Man Who Died (Union Jack #873, 1920)
36. The Shadow (Union Jack #876, 1920)
37. The Dog Detective (Union Jack #887, 1920)
38. A Bid For Billions (Union Jack #893, 1920)
39. The Extreme Penalty (Union Jack #895, 1920)
40. Crooked Evidence (Union Jack #901, 1921)
41. The Black Duchess (Union Jack #910, 1921)
42. The Fourth Witness (Union Jack #916, 1921)
43. Mr. Reece's Million (Union Jack #927, 1921)
44. Diamond Mad! (Union Jack #946, 1921)
45. The Confederation's Recruit (Union Jack #972, 1922)
46. The Diamond Clue (Union Jack #973, 1922)
47. The Hunchback of St. Madros (Union Jack #985, 1922)
48. The Return of Mr. Reece (Union Jack #1,056, 1924)
49. The Spider's Web (Union Jack #1,061, 1924)
50. The Key-Man of the Confederation (Union Jack #1,070, 1924)
51. The Rival Presidents (Union Jack #1,071, 1924)
52. Reece on the Run! (Union Jack #1,094, 1924)
53. The Mandarin's Millions (Union Jack #1,097, 1924)!
54. Found — and Lost! (Union Jack #1,117, 1925)
55. Reece's Republic (Union Jack #1,119, 1925)
56. Condemned to the Mines (Union Jack #1,125, 1925)
57. Yellow Vengeance (Union Jack #1,127, 1925)
58. Into the Unknown (Union Jack #1,133, 1925)
59. The Yellow City (Union Jack #1,137, 1925)
60. Buried Alive! (Union Jack #1,154, 1925)
61. Homeward Bound (Union Jack #1,155, 1925)
62. Landed at Last! (Union Jack #1,158, 1925)
63. Gone to Earth (Union Jack #1,163, 1926)
64. Reece's Hold-Up (Union Jack #1,164, 1926)
65. North of 70 (Union Jack #1,165, 1926)
66. Reece's Revenge (Union Jack #1,175, 1926)
67. The Marriage of Jason Reece (Union Jack #1,185, 1926)
68. Dirk Dolland's Crime (Union Jack #1,191, 1926)
69. The Great Round-Up! (Union Jack #1,196, 1926)

== Captain Justice ==
Captain Justice was the hero of a series of adventures published in Modern Boy, a weekly magazine published by Amalgamated Press throughout the 1930s. Throughout his career the Captain battled robots, giant insects, and runaway planets. Many of the adventures were republished as books in the Boys' Friend Library imprint of Amalgamated Press.

=== The Captain Justice Series ===
1. The Mystery Planet, 1932
2. The Earthquake Maker, 1933
3. The Secret Kingdom, 1933
4. The Rocketeers, 1933
5. The World in Darkness, 1934
6. The Weed Men, 1934
7. The Raiders of Robot City, 1935
8. The Ocean Robot, 1936
9. The Rival Robots, 1936
10. Captain Justice in the Land of Monsters 1936-1937
11. The Gold Raiders, 1937
12. The Flying Globes, 1938
13. The Outlaw Raiders, 1938
14. The City of Secrets, 1939

== New Collections ==
- Sexton Blake: Star of Union Jack and Detective Weekly (1972)
- Sexton Blake Wins (1986)
- The Sexton Blake Casebook (1987)
- Sexton Blake, Detective (2009)
- Sexton Blake: Friends and Allies (2020)
- Sexton Blake: The Master Criminals (2020)
- Sexton Blake: The Complete Dr. Satira, Volume 1 (2020)
- Sexton Blake: The Complete Dr. Satira, Volume 2 (2020)

Sexton Blake: The Criminals’ Confederation Series (2021-2022)

1. Sexton Blake: The Bat Files
2. Sexton Blake: The Bat Files #2
3. Sexton Blake: The Bat Files #3
4. Sexton Blake: The Bat Files #4
5. Sexton Blake: Confederation Rising
6. Sexton Blake: The Sinister Island Saga
7. Sexton Blake: Yvonne Joins the Fight
8. Sexton Blake: Beware the Shadow
9. Sexton Blake: Plots and Intrigues
10. Sexton Blake: Reversals of Fortune
11. Sexton Blake: The Rival Presidents
12. Sexton Blake: Reece's Republic
13. Sexton Blake: Twists in the Trail
14. Sexton Blake: Final Curtain
