= Strange Affair =

Strange Affair may refer to:

- Strange Affair (1944 film), a mystery
- The Strange Affair, a 1968 British crime film
- Strange Affair (1981 film), a French drama
- Strange Affair (album), a 1991 album by Wishbone Ash
- Strange Affair (novel), a 2005 mystery by Peter Robinson

== See also ==
- The Strange Affair of Uncle Harry, 1945 American film noir drama directed by Robert Siodmak
- The Strange Affair of Spring-Heeled Jack, 2005 novel in the Burton & Swinburne series by Mark Hodder
