= Things My Girlfriend and I Have Argued About =

2002 novel by Mil Millington

- First edition cover
- Author: Mil Millington
- Language: English
- Publisher: Flame
- Publication date: 3 October 2002
- Publication place: United Kingdom
- Media type: Print
- Pages: 352 (hardcover)
- ISBN: 0-340-82113-2 (hardcover)
- OCLC: 50269592

Things My Girlfriend and I Have Argued About is a novel by English writer Mil Millington. The work began as a website that Millington made about his arguments with his German girlfriend, Margret. Millington also adapted this theme to a column in The Guardian.

== Plot ==
Pel lives with his German girlfriend Ursula and their two children, and works in the IT department of a university library (or "Learning Centre"). The story begins with Pel receiving an odd call from his boss, TSR, who quizzes him about extradition treaties; within a week he has vanished without a trace, and Pel is promoted to TSR's former position, "Computer Team Administration, Software Acquisition and Training Manager" (though, in addition to his own job).

The story follows both Pel's home and work lives; at home, there are the arguments with Ursula over the search for a new home, after the latest burglary of their current home; defrosting the fridge during the moving preparations; Ursula terrifying the builders working on the repairs of the new house; a skiing accident, leaving Ursula with a torn ligament in her shoulder.

At work, Pel finds that taking on TSR's job involves more than it seemed at first; he has to pay off student recruiters from the Pacific Ring, who happen to be members of The Triads; he has to take care of the details of the building of a new Learning Centre building, which involves hiding the fact that skeletons from an ancient burial ground have been illegally dumped from the site, and a dangerous neurotoxin to be buried under it.

These details lead him to become closely involved with the permanently hungover Vice Chancellor of the university, which leads to his receiving another promotion, to Learning Centre Manager; the previous holder of that position having left to pursue his fetish website.

== The website ==
The website began in 2001 as a section of the author's home page, and quickly attracted a cult following for its humorous anecdotes, based on real arguments, chronicling arguments over such things as remote controls, the correct way to cut a kiwifruit, and even arguments over arguments.

Within two weeks the author had received offers from two publishers, and set about writing the book; in the meantime, however, he became embroiled in a legal argument when The Mail on Sunday printed, without permission, segments from the website.

=== Plagiarism ===
Millington received a call from an editor at the Mail on Sunday, who offered him £800 for permission to run excerpts from the website as an article. Because he had recently accepted a book-publishing deal, he declined the offer. However, the article ran in the February 11, 2001 edition of the newspaper. Millington and Margret's names were changed and Millington's site was not mentioned.

Millington wrote about the incident on his website and was shocked by the amount of support he received from his readers. Several websites picked up the story, most notably The Register, who had themselves been plagiarised by The Daily Mail, a sister newspaper of the Mail on Sunday.

The Mail on Sunday wrote Millington a letter of apology and paid him £1600.
