= The Metatemporal Detective =

2007 collection of short fiction by Michael Moorcock

- Dust-jacket from the first edition.
- Author: Michael Moorcock
- Cover artist: John Picacio
- Language: English
- Genre: Fantasy
- Publisher: Pyr
- Publication date: 2007
- Publication place: United States
- Media type: Print (hardback)
- Pages: 327
- ISBN: 978-1-59102-596-2
- OCLC: 154711419
- Dewey Decimal: 823/.914 22
- LC Class: PR6063.O59 M47 2007

The Metatemporal Detective is a collection of short fiction by British fantasy and literary writer Michael Moorcock.

The stories chart the adventures of the Holmesian detective Sir Seaton Begg, his trusty sidekick Dr. Taffy Sinclair and his complex relationship with his cousin, nemesis, and occasional ally, Monsieur Zenith. The stories are set in an eclectic range of times and places and were written over the course of Moorcock's long career. The book features characters from the Moorcock 'multiverse' including the ubiquitous Una Persson. Begg owes much to the character of Sexton Blake, Publishers Weekly termed the stories rather too 'broad' in their parody of established detective tropes . The stories were not, according to Moorcock, designed as literary parody.

Begg makes other appearances in Moorcock's work, most recently in Zenith Lives! and The Immortal Seaton Begg, both from Obverse Books and licensed from Moorcock.

== Contents ==
- "The Affair of the Seven Virgins"
- "Crimson Eyes"
- "The Ghost Warriors"
- "The Girl Who Killed Sylvia Blade"
- "The Case of the Nazi Canary"
- "Sir Milk-and-Blood"
- "The Mystery of the Texas Twister"
- "London Flesh"
- "The Pleasure Garden of Felipe Sagittarius"
- "The Affair of Le Bassin des Hivers"
- "The Flaneur des Arcades de l'Opera"
