= Mil Millington =

British author of humorous books

- Occupation: Writer
- Writing career
- Period: 2001-present
- Genres: Fiction, Humour
- Website: www.mil-millington.com

Robert "Mil" Millington is a British author of humorous books.

== History ==
Millington first came to public prominence as a writer when he created a web-site entitled "Things My Girlfriend and I Have Argued About", describing arguments and misunderstandings between Millington and his German girlfriend Margret, mother of his two sons. The site was initially hosted on Wolverhampton University's web servers, but Millington was required to move it to privately owned servers when concerns arose about the site's content which included a "sex survey" about women with hairy armpits.

Due to the site's popularity, Millington was offered a publishing deal, and wrote a novel with the same title as his website, but with new content, published in 2002. He has published four subsequent novels with humorous content: and his works have been translated into Japanese, Russian, Dutch, German, Swedish, Finnish, Hebrew, Spanish, and Serbo-Croat.

== Bibliography ==
=== Webpage ===
- Things My Girlfriend and I Have Argued About

=== Novels ===
- Things My Girlfriend and I Have Argued About (2002)
- A Certain Chemistry (2003)
- Love And Other Near Death Experiences (2006)
- Beginners Guide to Life (2006)
- Instructions For Living Someone Else's Life (2007)

== Other works ==
Millington is also the co-creator of the site www.TheWeekly.co.uk, and has contributed to several newspapers, notably The Guardian and the Daily Express. His work for the Guardian included a column called "Anxious About Everything"

The Guardian newspaper named Millington as one of the five best debut novelists in 2002. In 2009 he worked with Jonathan Nash on scripts for the BBC radio series The Adventures of Sexton Blake. (2009)
