= Dinendra Kumar Roy =

Bengali novelist and editor

- দীনেন্দ্র কুমার রায়
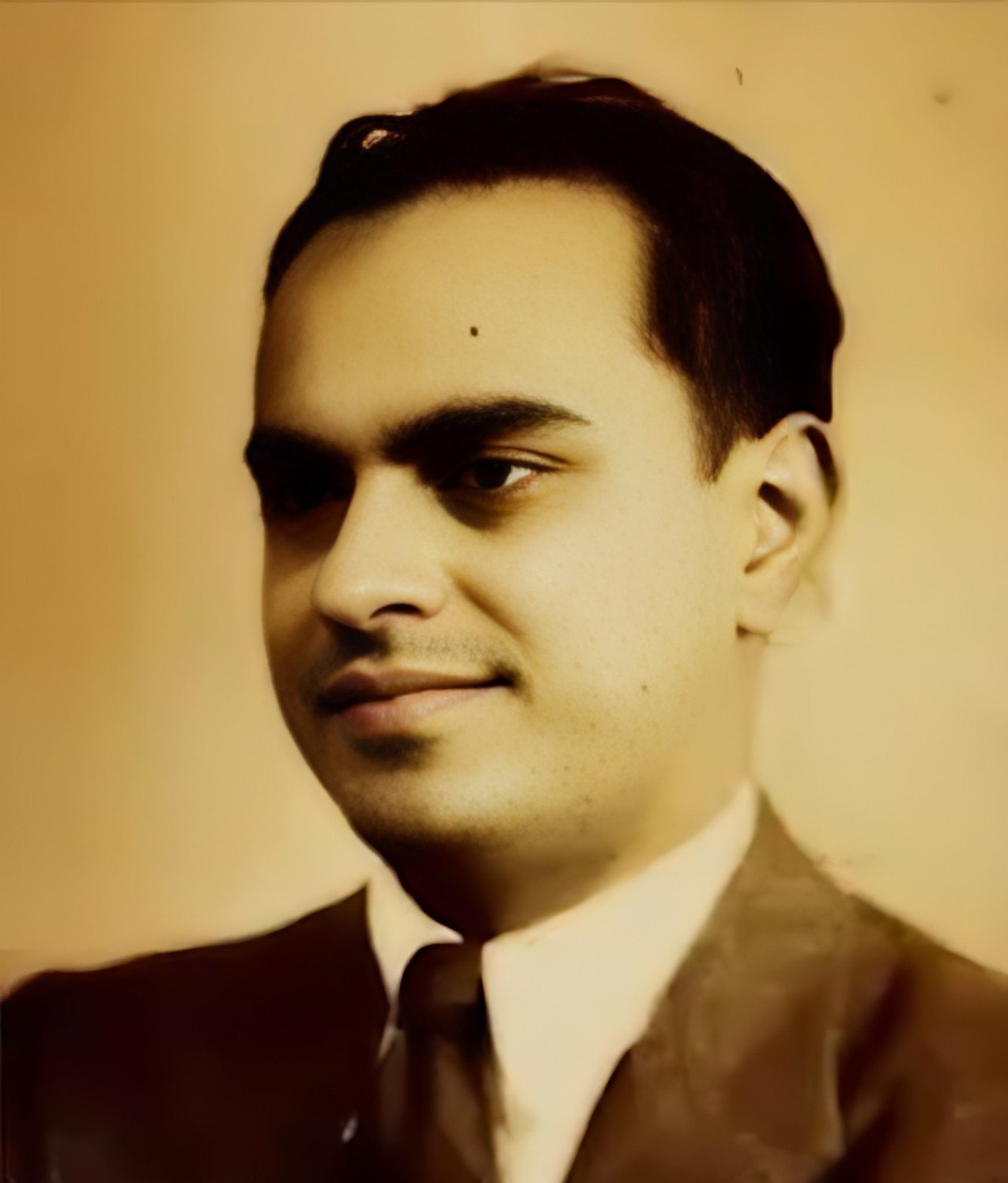
- Born: 26 August 1869; Meherpur, Bengal Presidency, British India (Present day in Bangladesh)
- Died: 27 June 1943 (aged 73); Calcutta, British India (Present day Kolkata, India)
- Education: Mahisadal Raj High School, Krishnagar Government College
- Occupations: Writer, Novelist, Editor

Dinendra Kumar Roy (26 August 1869 – 27 June 1943) was a Bengali novelist and editor.

== Early life ==
Roy was born in 1869 in Meherpur, British India. His father name was Brajanath Roy. He passed entrance from Mahisadal Raj High School and entered in Krishnagar Government College. In 1893 Roy became employed under the District judge of Rajshahi. He was appointed as Bengali language tutor of Sri Aurobindo as per recommendation of Rabindranath Tagore and stayed 2 years with Aurobindo in Baroda.

== Literary career ==
Cover page of Rahasya Lahari Series

Roy's first article was published in Bharati and Balok magazine. He became the sub editor of Saptahik Basumati magazine in 1900 at the same time edited Nandan Kanan monthly magazine. He became popular for Rahasya Lahari and Nandan Kanon detective series. Roy's created Robert Blake (Detective) series was based on Sexton Blake detective stories. In between 1898 and 1914 total 217 detective fictions of Robert Blake were published in Bengali. His books on villagers' lives and Hindu religious festivals in the villages of Bengal was admired by Tagore. Roy's other Books are:

- Basanti
- Palli Baichitra
- Palli Chitra
- Hamida
- Pat
- Ajay Singher Kuthi
- Pallikatha
- Palli Charitra
- Dhenkir Kirti
