= Detective Weekly =

Weekly British story paper (1933–1940)

- Categories: Story paper
- Frequency: Weekly
- First issue: 1933; 92 years ago
- Final issue: 1940
- Company: Amalgamated Press
- Country: United Kingdom
- Based in: London
- Language: English

Detective Weekly was a weekly British story paper that ran for 379 issues, from 25 February 1933 to 25 May 1940.

== Overview ==
Detective Weekly was a continuation of the Union Jack, the story paper which had begun in 1894 and which had for most of its life been famous as "Sexton Blake's own paper". Issue 1 of Detective Weekly was dated 25 February 1933, a week after the last Union Jack. Its publisher was London-based Amalgamated Press. It was a larger paper, approximately 25x32cm in size, and unlike its predecessor rarely used colour. It ran for 379 issues.

The first 130 issues concentrated on Sexton Blake, and his family history, with a wayward brother turning up. However, in later issues the character would be dropped entirely. He returned to the paper in the late 1930s, but most of the stories were reprints of earlier Union Jack stories from the 1920s.

The final issue of the paper was dated 25 May 1940, following the introduction of paper rationing in World War II. This left The Sexton Blake Library as the only publication containing stories of the detective, aside from the comic strips in Knockout.

British researchers Bill Lofts and Derek Adley authored The Detective Weekly A Bibliography, published privately by Happy Hours Unlimited, circa 1987.
