= W. O. G. Lofts =

British researcher and author

- Born: 2 September 1923; Marylebone, London, England
- Died: 27 June 1997 (aged 73); Kensington and Chelsea, London
- Occupations: Researcher and author
- Years active: 1942–1994
- Known for: Cataloging British Juvenile Fiction
- Notable work: The Men Behind Boys' Fiction

William Oliver Guillemont Lofts (2 September 1923 – 27 June 1997) was a British researcher and author.

Lofts was born in Marylebone, London in 1923, and attended Barrow Hill Road Elementary School. At sixteen he was working as an office boy, and still living at home at 146 Ashbridge Street in Marylebone. During the Second World War, he enlisted in the Royal Artillery on 6 August 1942 and served in India and Myanmar for almost all of his service. It was during his military service that he first became avidly interested in juvenile fiction, after coming across a "Sexton Blake" paperback in a deserted hut in 1944.

From the 1960s to the 1980s he worked for the legal department of IPC Magazines, mostly researching issues related to copyright. He was deeply interested in boys' fiction, and spent years researching the topic, collaborating with another researcher Derek John Adley, on many bibliographic works.

Lofts' writings include The Saint and Leslie Charteris (1970) and The World of Frank Richards (1975).

== Works ==
Writing by W. O. G. Lofts (BL refers to British Library)
No	Year	Title	Other Author	Pages	Publisher	ISBN	BL	Source, if other than BL	On-line link
1	1969	The British Bibliography of Edgar Wallace	Derek John Adley	246	Howard Baker, London	0093047606	Yes		Internet archive
2	1969	Old Boys Books: A Complete Catalogue	Derek John Adley	93	Authors, York		Yes		Friardale
3	1970	The Men Behind Boys' Fiction	Derek John Adley	361	Howard Baker, London	0093047703	Yes		Internet archive
4	1971	The Saint and Leslie Charteris	Derek John Adley	135	Hutchinson Library Services, London	0093048009	Yes		
5	1975	World Of Frank Richards	Derek John Adley	206	Howard Baker, London	0703000683	No	Amazon.co.uk	Friardale
6	c. 1978	The Rupert Index: A Bibliography of Rupert Bear	Derek John Adley	74	Norman Shaw, London		Yes		
7	c. 1980	William: A Bibliography	Derek John Adley	51	Norman Shaw, London		Yes		
8	c. 1981	The Gem Index: A Catalogue of St. Jim's Stories	Derek John Adley	94	Authors, South Harrow?		Yes	Page count from AbeBooks-Peakirk Books	
9	1982	Catalogue of Boys & Girls Annuals	Derek John Adley	143	Authors, South Harrow		Yes		
10	1982	The Hotspur, A Catalogue 1933–1959	Derek John Adley	67	Authors, South Harrow		No	Abe Books-Burwood Books, Wickham Market	
11	c. 1983	Greyfriars Since The Magnet : A Bibliography	Derek John Adley	19	Authors, South Harrow		Yes		Friardale
12	1983	The Thriller	Derek John Adley	20	A Cadwallender, Manchester		No	Abe Books-Burwood Books, Wickham Market	
13	1986	Identification Guide To The D. C. Thomson And John Leng Children's Annuals 1921–1964.	Derek John Adley	38	Yesterday's Paper, Wellington		No	Abe Books-Any Amount of Books, London	
14	1986	The Concise Magnet Companion '86, Edited by George Beal	George Beal	97			No		
15	1987	The Detective Weekly: A Bibliography	Derek John Adley	21	Authors		No	AbeBooks-Any Amount of Books, London	
16	1987	Origins of the Boys Friend Library	Derek John Adley		Howard Baker, London		No	Amazon.co.uk	
17	1990	The Thriller : The Paper with a Thousand Thrills	Derek John Adley	48	C.J. Publications/A.B. Whitworth		No	Abe Books-Any Amount of Books, London	
18	1991	The New Rupert Index: Revised and Updated by John Beck	Derek John Adley, John Beck	117	John Beck		No	Abe Books-D2D Books, Berkshire	
19	1994	Rookwood	Derek John Adley	45	Happy Hours, Leeds		No	Abe Books-Any Amount of Books, London	Friardale
