= Robert Blake (detective) =

Robert Blake is a fictional detective character created by Bengali novelist Dinendra Kumar Roy.

== Character ==
The Robert Blake series was based on the Sexton Blake detective stories. In between 1898 and 1914, a total of 217 detective stories about Blake were published in Bengali including the Rahasya Lahari and Nandan Kanon series. Roy not only translated Western detective stories but, intriguingly, went on to create the popular, London-bred, Euro-centric detective for Bengali readers. Robert Blake is a British investigator, lives in Baker Street, London. He is often helped by his assistant Smith.
