= The Counterfeit Detective =

2016 novel written by Stuart Douglas

- Author: Stuart Douglas
- Language: English
- Genre: Mystery
- Published: 18 October 2016 (Titan Books)
- Publication place: United Kingdom
- Media type: Novel
- Pages: 272
- ISBN: 978-1-78329-925-6 (first edition)

The Counterfeit Detective is a 2016 mystery pastiche novel written by Stuart Douglas, featuring Sherlock Holmes and Dr. John Watson up against an impostor.

Titan Books published the book in October 2016, as part of its Further Adventures series, which collects a number of noted Holmesian pastiches.

== Plot ==
Holmes and Watson sail to New York to investigate another Sherlock Holmes, whose powers and results are comparable to the original. However, in trying to get answers, their target has vanished and his clients are far from obliging...

== Reception ==
Publishers Weekly were positive, saying 'Watson is an active partner to his friend, and the plot twists will surprise many readers. Fans of traditional pastiches will hope that Douglas writes more of them.'

== See also ==
- Sherlock Holmes pastiches
