= Andrew Nicholas Murray =

British adventure and detective fiction author (1879–1929)

- Born: 13 January 1879; Islay, Argyll, Scotland
- Died: 3 June 1929 (aged 50); Epsom, Surrey
- Occupation: Writer
- Writing career
- Pen name: Andrew Murray; Captain Malcolm Arnold; Nicholas Islay
- Period: 1908–1924
- Genres: Detective fiction Adventure fiction

Andrew Nicholas Murray (1 January 1879 – 3 June 1929) was a British writer who wrote under the pen-names Captain Malcolm Arnold, Vesey Deane, Geoffrey Murray, Andrew Murray and Nicholas Islay.

He wrote primarily adventure and detective fiction for British boys' story papers, and is best remembered for his tales featuring fictional British detective Sexton Blake.

== Life ==
Andrew Nicholas Murray was born on January 13, 1879, in Islay, Argyll, Scotland. His father was a local general practitioner. Orphaned at the age of sixteen, Murray moved to London, where he worked various jobs before enlisting in the Scots Guards. During his service, Murray fought in the Second Boer War and contributed writings to military publications such as Army Graphic and The Brigade of Guards Gazette, where he was recognized as Poet Laureate.

After purchasing his discharge from the army, Murray joined the Amalgamated Press, where he initially wrote romance stories for Answers Library.

He wrote a variety of boys' sports and military stories under the pen-name Captain Malcolm Arnold, (a name he kept using until the end of his career), which were serialized in story papers The Boys' Realm, Boys' Friend, The Champion and Boys' Friend Library. These tales include The Masked Boxer (1913) From Chopping Block to Champion (1919) and The Sports Syndicate! (1922).

In 1911, he made his debut in the Sexton Blake detective series with Sexton Blake, Boxing Trainer in The Union Jack #388. His tales proved popular and in December of that year he was asked to write the Christmas Double issue, The Wandering Heir,. Murray was a highly prolific writer and of the 200 authors who wrote Sexton Blake stories, Murray was the second publish a hundred tales. In all, over the course of his career, he wrote more than 173 Sexton Blake stories for The Union Jack and The Sexton Blake Library.

In 1920, Murray founded his own publishing company, releasing three novels:

- The Lady of the Guns (as Andrew Murray)
- A Brace of Rogues (as Nicholas Islay)
- The Selicombe Murder (as Nicholas Islay)

Bad health forced him to give up his writing career in 1924. His last tale was The Sign of The Yellow Dragon Union Jack #1,063 an issue notable for the debut cover of artist Eric Parker (illustrator).

Andrew Nicholas Murray died in 1929 in Epsom, Surrey following a prolonged illness.

== Legacy ==
Murray was a prolific contributor to early 20th-century British Boys' story papers, particularly in detective and adventure genres. His work in the Sexton Blake canon remains a significant part of the character’s long-running literary history. He created several memorable master criminals including Count Ivor Carlac, Professor Francis Kew, and Count Bonali the Owl, as well as popular Blake allies John Lawless, Humble Begge, Trouble Nantucket and Adrian Steele.

Master criminal Count Ivor Carlac was created in 1912 in response to the popularity of Blake nemesis George Marsden Plummer and was the detective's second recurring foe. The tales were highly popular and in 1913 Murray created a second master criminal, Professor Francis Kew. who along with characters created by George Hamilton Teed ushered in Blake's era of master criminals.

In 1915 the Kew and Carlac joined forces and would continue to match wits with Blake over the next 25 years, becoming as well-known in popular culture as "whisky and soda or eggs and bacon." In all the two would feature in more than 50 tales, their adventures coming to an end in The Fatal Fortune, The Sexton Blake Library 2nd series issue 656, 1939.

Murray's other most noteworthy contribution was the Honourable John Lawless, a gentleman adventurer "who often sailed close to the wind." He appeared in close to forty tales with Blake, the two solving mysteries and having adventures in various countries across the globe

Murray's prose was quite modern by the standards of the early twentieth century and were considered by fans to be a credit to any Sexton Blake collection.

== Selected works ==
=== Count Ivor Carlac ===
- The Regent Street Robbery, Union Jack issue 468 (1912)
- The Case of the Borgia Bronze (Union Jack issue 470, 1912)
- The Opium Smugglers (Union Jack issue 472, 1912)
- Carlac — Gun-Runner (Union Jack, issue 474, 1912)
- The Mad Millionaire (Union Jack issue 478, 1912)
- The Great Boxing Fraud (Union Jack issue 483, 1913)
- The Ten Millionaires (Union Jack issue 486, 1913)
- The Case of the Emigrant Slaves (Union Jack issue 489, 1913)
- The Wandering Baronet, Union Jack issue 497 (1913)
- The Sugar Planter's Secret (Union Jack issue 500, 1913)
- The Great Conspiracy (Dreadnought issues 61 to 67, 1913)
- The Case of the Suffragette Raid (Union Jack issue 503, 1913)
- The Ex-Convict's Secret (Union Jack issue 506, 1913)

=== Professor Francis Kew ===
- The Aylesbury Square Mystery (Union Jack issue 511, 1913)
- Foiled by Sexton Blake (Union Jack issue 514, 1913)
- The Case of the Motor Cyclist (Union Jack issue 520, 1913)
- Tinker's Terrible Test (Union Jack issue 525, 1913)
- The Blackmailer's Secret (Union Jack issue 531, 1913)
- The Mystery of the Monastery (Union Jack issue 535, 1914)
- The Death Cylinder (Union Jack issue 544, 1914)

=== Kew and Carlac ===
- Ill-Gotten Gains (The Sexton Blake Library 1st series issue 2, 1915)
- The Rajah's Revenge (The Sexton Blake Library 1st series issue 4, 1915)
- Victims of Villainy (The Sexton Blake Library 1st series issue 8, 1916)
- His Excellency's Secret (The Sexton Blake Library 1st series issue 19, 1916)
- The Secret of the Draker's Folly (The Sexton Blake Library 1st series issue 25, 1917)
- The Catspaw (The Sexton Blake Library 1st series issue 29, 1917)
- The Stolen Negative Union Jack issue 770, 1918)
- The Missing Ships (The Sexton Blake Library 1st series issue 55, 1918)
- The Case of the Car Copers Union Jack issue 823, 1919)
- The Great House-Purchase Fraud Union Jack issue 834, 1919)
- The First Born Son (The Sexton Blake Library 1st series issue 64, 1919)
- Outcasts (The Sexton Blake Library 1st series issue 72, 1919)
- Settler or Slaver? (The Sexton Blake Library 1st series issue 84, 1919)
- The Ex-Soldier Employment Swindle (The Sexton Blake Library 1st series issue 98, 1919)
- Loot! (The Sexton Blake Library 1st series issue 104, 1919)
- In the Midnight Express (The Sexton Blake Library 1st series issue 64, 1920)
- The Turkish Bath Mystery Union Jack issue 899, 1921)
- The Case of the Mystery Millionaire (The Sexton Blake Library 1st series issue 179, 1921)
- The Mystery of the Dereland Castle Union Jack issue 955, 1922)
- The Case of the Mystery Plantation Union Jack issue 975, 1922)
- The Case of the Bond Street Dentist Union Jack issue 979, 1922)
- The Case of the Great St. Leger Fraud Union Jack issue 987, 1922)
- The Thousandth Chance Union Jack issue 1,000, 1922)
- The Motor-Coach Mystery (The Sexton Blake Library 1st series issue 210, 1922)
- The Case of the Uncut Gems (The Sexton Blake Library 1st series issue 230, 1922)
- The Mystery of the Clock (The Sexton Blake Library 1st series issue 252, 1922)
- The Gargoyle's Secret Union Jack issue 1,039, 1923)
- The Return of Professor Kew Union Jack issue 1,181, 1926)
- The Case of the Phantom Ferry Union Jack issue 1,186, 1926)
- The Adventure of the Railway Raiders Union Jack issue 1,189, 1926)
- 200 Fathoms Down! Union Jack issue 1,195, 1926)
- The Fatal Fortune (The Sexton Blake Library 2nd series issue 656, 1939)

=== The Honourable John Lawless ===
- The Boundary Raiders (Union Jack issue 554, 1914)
- A Bid for a Battleship (Union Jack issue 550, 1914)
- Arms for Ulster (Union Jack issue 561, 1914)
- The Bogus Prince (Union Jack issue 563, 1914)
- The Mystery of Shamrock IV (Union Jack issue 569, 1914)
- The Case of the German Admiral (Union Jack issue 570, 1914)
- Made in Germany (Union Jack issue 575, 1914)
- Business As Usual (Union Jack issue 578, 1914)
- The Food Profiteer (Union Jack issue 676, 1916)
- The Wheat Ring (Union Jack issue 683, 1916)
- The Catspaw (The Sexton Blake Library 1st series issue 29, 1917)
- The Stolen Factory (Union Jack issue 699, 1917)
- The Half-Caste (The Sexton Blake Library 1st series issue 35, 1917)
- Vengeance (The Sexton Blake Library 1st series issue 38, 1917)
- The Case of the £10,000 Fee (Union Jack issue 739, 1917)
- The Barrier Reef Mystery (The Sexton Blake Library 1st series issue 45, 1917)
- The Stolen Negative (Union Jack issue 770, 1918)
- The Mosque of the Mahdi (The Sexton Blake Library 1st series issue 52, 1918)
- The Missing Ships (The Sexton Blake Library 1st series issue 55, 1918)
- The Luck of the Darrells (The Sexton Blake Library 1st series issue 60, 1918)

== Sexton Blake Collections ==
- Sexton Blake: Friends and Allies (2021)
- Sexton Blake: The Master Criminals (2021)
- Sexton Blake: The Carlac Files #1 (2024)
- Sexton Blake:The Carlac Files #2 (2024)
- Sexton Blake:The Carlac Files #3 (2024)
- Sexton Blake:The Kew Files (2021)
- Sexton Blake:The Kew and Carlac Files #1 (2025)
