= The Strange Affair of Spring-Heeled Jack =

Steampunk novel

First edition (publ. Snowbooks)

The Strange Affair of Spring-Heeled Jack is a steampunk novel by the British writer Mark Hodder, the first novel in the Burton & Swinburne series; it won the 2010 Philip K. Dick Award. The series follows the adventures of two Victorian-era protagonists based on two historical figures, Richard Francis Burton and Algernon Charles Swinburne, in mid-late 19th Century London.

The series is framed as an alternate history, and takes place in actual locations such as the Cannibal Club and London's East End, involving many notable personalities of the era, such as Florence Nightingale, Charles Darwin, and explorer John Hanning Speke. It includes actual historical events, namely the Spring-heeled Jack case, the assassination attempt on Queen Victoria in 1840, the search for the source of the Nile and the development of Darwin's theory of Evolution.

== Plot summary ==
A time-traveller from the distant future returns to 1840 to prevent an ancestor from attempting to commit an act of regicide. After failing in his mission, he returns to 1837 and recruits the 'Mad Marquess' to find his ancestor and correct the error. The result of his interference is an altered timeline in which technological advances have given rise to two scientific classes: 'Technologists' and 'Eugenicists' (See Technologies).

Sir Richard Francis Burton returns to find his reputation damaged and his second-in-command lionised as the discoverer of the source of the Nile. He is recruited by the Prime Minister, in the capacity of King's Agent, to investigate the Spring-heeled Jack affair and the strange manifestations plaguing London's East End.

== Characters ==
- Richard Francis Burton: adventurer, linguist, orientalist, swordsman, and former Captain in the Royal African Corps. While he and Speke were the first Europeans to view the African Great Lakes, they quarrelled over which one was the source of the Nile. Although Burton had headed the expedition, Speke returned to London first and presented his conclusions, which were accepted. Burton was cast into a secondary role and his career as an explorer was tarnished.
- Algernon Charles Swinburne: poet and novelist closely associated with the decadent movement of the 19th Century.
- Henry Beresford, 3rd Marquess of Waterford: popularly known as the 'Mad Marquess', Henry de la Poer Beresford was a notorious rake of the era, and the central suspect in the Spring-Heeled Jack attacks.
- Edward Oxford: would-be assassin of Queen Victoria in 1840. Tried for high treason at the Old Bailey and acquitted due to insanity.

== Technologies ==
- Time-Travel is achieved through a 'fish-scale' solar battery suit, propelled by hydraulic spring-loaded stilts and powered by a mysterious diamond.
- steam-propelled machinery is ubiquitous and powers an entire range of devices from mechanical horse-drawn carriages to single-person flying devices.
- Genetic modification: the 'Eugenicist' class in this alternate history have succeeded in creating over-sized animals and modifying existing flora and fauna for the purposes of serving civilisation.

== Critical reception ==
Michael Dirda wrote in The Washington Post: "As fantasy, the novel doesn't really break new ground, given that the plot combines elements from notable works by Robert A. Heinlein, H.G. Wells and Aldous Huxley, among others. But if you're looking for a cold night's entertainment, this high-spirited mix of fact and fancy will do quite nicely, quite nicely indeed."

== Sources ==
- The Strange Affair of Spring-Heeled Jack. Pyr. 2010. ISBN 978-1-61614-240-7.
