= Stuart Douglas (writer) =

Scottish author, editor and publisher

Stuart Douglas (born October 1969) is an author, editor and publisher from Edinburgh. Douglas is the founder of British publisher Obverse Books, an independent publishing house known for its speculative fiction, particularly in the realms of science fiction, fantasy, and weird fiction. He is the range editor for the Black Archive and Silver Archive series of monographs on genre television.

Douglas has written several Sherlock Holmes stories, including four novels published by Titan Publishing Group and short stories that expand on Sir Arthur Conan Doyle's famous detective.

In 2024, Titan published the first in an ongoing series of cosy mystery novels by Douglas, the Lowe and Le Breton Mysteries, in which two characters based on the actors Arthur Lowe and John Le Mesurier from 1970s sitcom Dad's Army solve crimes on the set of their new show.

Douglas was the features editor for the British Fantasy Society Journal from 2012 to 2017.

In 2022, Douglas set up Obverse Music, with his long term associate, Scott Liddell.

== Awards ==
The Black Archive #15: Full Circle by John Toon, edited by Douglas, won New Zealand science fiction's Sir Julius Vogel Award for Best Professional Publication in 2019. Toon received the same award in 2022 for The Black Archive #61: Paradise Towers.

== Writing ==
=== The Lowe and Le Breton Mysteries ===
- Death at the Dress Rehearsal (Titan Books, 2024)
- Death at the Playhouses (Titan Books, 2025)

=== Sherlock Holmes novels ===
Douglas has written five Sherlock Holmes pastiche novels for Titan Books.

- The Albino's Treasure (2015)
- The Counterfeit Detective (2016)
- The Improbable Prisoner (2018)
- The Crusader's Curse (2020)
- Sherlock Holmes and the Christmas Murders (2026)

=== Novellas ===
- 'Death of a Mudlark' in The Sign of Seven (2019)
- 'The Shape of Things' in Ms Wildthyme and Friends Investigate (Obverse Books, 2010)
- Senor 105 and the Secret Santa (Manleigh Books, 2012)

== Editor ==
- Iris Wildthyme and the Celestial Omnibus (with Paul Magrs, Obverse Books, 2009)
- The Panda Book of Horror (with Paul Magrs, Obverse Books, 2009)
- Iris: Abroad (with Paul Magrs, Obverse Books, 2010)
- A Romance in Twelve Parts (Obverse Books, 2011)
- The Obverse Book of Detectives (Obverse Books)
- Wildthyme in Purple (with Cody Quijano-Schell, Obverse Books, 2012)
- Fifteen (Obverse Books, 2013)
- A Clockwork Iris (with George Mann, and Paul Magrs, 2017)
- Build High for Happiness (Obverse Books, 2022)
- The Boulevard: Volume One (Obverse Books, 2022)
- Party Like It's 1998 (with Paul Magrs, 2025)
