= William Murray Graydon =

American writer

- William Murray Graydon
- Born: 4 February 1864; Harrisburg, Pennsylvania, USA
- Died: 5 April 1946 (aged 82); Cornwall, England
- Occupation: Writer
- Writing career
- Period: 1890 – 1931
- Genres: Detective fiction, Adventure fiction

William Murray Graydon (February 4, 1864 – April 5, 1946) was an extremely prolific American writer who also wrote under the pen-names Alfred Armitage, William Murray, and Tom Olliver. He wrote adventure, historical fiction and Sexton Blake detective stories for boy's story papers.

== Life and work ==
William Murray Graydon was born in Harrisburg, Pennsylvania, the son of Henry Graydon, a prominent lawyer. He was the eldest of four children, and had three younger sisters Mary, Julia, and Alice. He was educated at the Harrisburg Academy and spent seven years there. He began writing while employed as a clerk at the Harrisburg National Bank. His first stories were mainly boys adventures about canoeing, fishing, camping, based on his real life experiences. His first stories were published in the Harrisburg Telegraph and in Forest and Stream though his success truly began when his stories began to be published in The Argosy in the 1890s.

In 1886, he married Pearl Ellen Balsley. His son Robert Murray Graydon was born in 1890 and his daughter Rachel Sloane Graydon the following year. In the early 1890s, William Murray Graydon began to write stories and novels of foreign and historical adventure. He began taking trips to England and selling his stories to the boy story papers there. In 1896 he moved his family to England. Details are a little vague in terms of their movements during their early stay in the UK. 1901 saw the family living in Horses Head, Upton (Norfolk). The 1911 Census reported that they had moved to the Fulton District in London.

Graydon published in a variety of boy adventure genres: travelogues in exotic lands, historical adventures and even a lost world tale set in Africa. One of his earliest popular creations was wild beast purveyor Matthew Quin, who appeared in about 30 short stories in the United States between January 1898 and November 1902. Graydon also created detectives Carfax Baines, Gordon Fox, Abel Link and Derek Clyde, but though they featured in several tales none of them ever achieved the popularity of rival story paper detectives Sexton Blake and Nelson Lee.

In 1904, he published his first Sexton Blake story The Mystery of the Hilton Royal in Union Jack #62. He would continue publishing Sexton Blake stories for the next twenty-five years, his last tale The Crime of Convict 13 was published in The Sexton Blake Library #260 in 1930. Throughout his career he contributed to a variety of story papers including Boys Herald; Boys' Journal; Champion; Cheer, Boys, Cheer; Greyfriars Herald (ser. 2); Nuggets; Pluck (ser. 1, 2, 3); Popular (ser. 1); True Blue (ser. 2); Detective Library, Football and Sports Library, Nelson Lee Library, Nugget Library, and Penny Popular.

He retired from writing in the 1930s and lived in Paris until shortly before the start of the Second World War. Upon his return to England he lived in Cornwall where he died in April 1946.

== Sexton Blake ==
William Murray Graydon was one of the most prolific Sexton Blake authors, penning over two hundred and sixty tales over the course of his long career. He was arguably the most influential Blake writer of the Edwardian era. He moved Blake to Baker Street, and created two greatly loved recurring characters: Blake's wise and ferocious bloodhound Pedro in The Dog Detective in Union Jack #100, and his comical landlady Mrs. Bardell in The House of Mystery in Union Jack #97. His other creations include Inspector Widgeon, American detective Fenlock Fawn, British Secret Service agent Cavendish Doyle, and master criminals Basil Wicketshaw and Laban Creed.

He wrote a variety of Sexton Blake 'overseas' tales like Sexton Blake in Rome, Sexton Blake in Turkey, Sexton Blake in Jamaica or 'undercover' tales like Sexton Blake, Aeronaut, The Steward Detective, Sexton Blake, Playwright and Sexton Blake, Sandwich-Man popular in the Edwardian age. Perhaps his best remembered works are Sexton Blake in the Congo and Across the Equator, two long serials that ran in Boys' Friend in 1907.

== Select Bibliography ==
- The River of Darkness, (The Argosy, 1890)
- In the days of Washington; a story of the American revolution (Philadelphia, The Penn publishing company, 1896)
- The White King of Africa: or, The Mystery of the Ancient Fort (NY: Street & Smith, 1899.)
- The Princess of the Purple Palace (New York : McClure, Phillips & Company, 1901)
- The Rajah's Fortress (New York : Street & Smith, c1900)
- Canoe Boys and Campfires (or Adventures on Winding Waters) (1907)

== New Collections ==
- The Sexton Blake Casebook (1987)
- The Casebook of Sexton Blake (2009)
- Sexton Blake and the Great War (2020)
- Sexton Blake: Friends and Allies (2020)
