= Mark Hodder =

English author

Mark Hodder is an English author, since 2008 living in Spain. His six-part series of 'Burton & Swinburne' steampunk novels opened with The Strange Affair of Spring-Heeled Jack, which went on to win the 2010 Philip K. Dick Award. The following two novels, The Curious Case of the Clockwork-Man and Expedition to the Mountains of the Moon, were released in 2011 and 2012 respectively to wide acclaim from fans of the genre, with the latter nominated for a Sidewise Award. His fourth novel in the Burton & Swinburne series, The Secret of Abdu El Yezdi, was also nominated for a Sidewise Award.

The standalone novel, A Red Sun Also Rises, released in December 2012, transplants a version of Victorian London to another planet.

In 2015, Hodder began writing a new series set in the far future, called The Oxford Equation.

Hodder is a noted enthusiast for the character of Sexton Blake. He was an advisor to several reprint volumes of Blake stories, and the author of the first book in the relaunched sixth series of the Sexton Blake Library, 'The Silent Thunder Caper'.

== Bibliography ==
=== Novels ===
- Hodder, Mark (2012). A red sun also rises. Pyr.
- Sexton Blake: The Silent Thunder Caper. Obverse Books. 2014. ISBN 978-1-90903-121-0.

Burton & Swinburne series

- The Strange Affair of Spring-Heeled Jack. Pyr. 2010. ISBN 978-1-61614-240-7.
- The Curious Case of the Clockwork Man. Pyr. 2011. ISBN 978-1-907777-02-8.
- Expedition to the Mountains of the Moon. Pyr. 2012. ISBN 978-1-61614-535-4.
- The Secret of Abdu El Yezdi. Pyr. 2013. ISBN 978-1-61614-777-8.
- The Return of the Discontinued Man. Pyr. 2014. ISBN 978-1-61614-905-5.
- The Rise of the Automated Aristocrats. Pyr. 2015. ISBN 978-1-63388-052-8. (published August 2015)

=== Short fiction ===
- "Blood of the Land" in Zenith Lives!. Obverse Books. 2011. ISBN 9780956560599.

=== Critical studies and reviews of Hodder's work ===
A red sun also rises

- Di Filippo, Paul (August 2013). "On Books". Asimov's Science Fiction. 37 (8): 107–111.
