= The Sexton Blake Library =

Story paper

- Cover The Sexton Blake Library #1 from 1915
- Categories: Story paper
- Frequency: Weekly
- Publisher: Amalgamated Press
- First issue: 1915; 111 years ago
- Final issue: 1968
- Country: United Kingdom
- Based in: London
- Language: English

The Sexton Blake Library was a story paper of the first two-thirds of the 20th century, published by Amalgamated Press. It featured the adventures of private detective Sexton Blake, his boy assistant Tinker and their dog Pedro. It made its debut as a pocket-sized digest on September 20, 1915 and ran uninterrupted until June 1963. After a brief hiatus, it returned in paperback format in February 1965 and ran for 45 issues until October 1968.

== Overview ==
By the end of the first decade of the 20th century Sexton Blake was arguably the most popular detective in the boy story papers, featuring in weekly tales in the Union Jack. With the success of longer Blake tales in The Boys' Friend Library the Amalgamated Press decided to give him his own story paper.The Sexton Blake Library debuted in 1915. The digest-sized publication specialized in longer tales, and at the height of its popularity was published 5 times a month. The Sexton Blake Library was published in five "series" over the next fifty years. Publication ranged from 2–4 issues per month until the end of series 4 in 1964. Series 5, starting in 1965, was a sporadic series of paperbacks. The last edition, "Down Among The Ad Men" written by W. A Ballinger (Wilfred McNeilly), was published in October 1968.

Series 1 ran from September 1915 until May 1925, a total of 382 issues. The first title in the series was The Yellow Tiger and was written by George Hamilton Teed.

Series 2 ran from May 1925 until June 1941, a total of 744 issues. The first title in the series was The Secret of the Coconut Grove and was written by George Hamilton Teed.

Series 3 ran from June 1941 until April 1956, a total of 358 issues. The first title in the series was Raiders Passed written by John Hunter.

Series 4 ran from June 1956 until June 1963, a total of 168 issues. The first title in the series was Frightened Lady by Howard Baker.

Series 5 ran from February 1965 until 12 October 1968, a total of 45 issues. The first title in the series was Murderer at Large written by W. A. Ballinger. The last was Down Among the Ad Men written by the same author.

Writers who worked on Sexton Blake stories throughout this 53-year span included Charles Henry St. John Cooper,George Hamilton Teed, Edwy Searles Brooks, William Murray Graydon, Robert Murray Graydon, John Creasey, Jack Trevor Story, John G. Brandon, Michael Moorcock, and many many others.

The majority of Sexton Blake Library covers (prior to editor William Howard Baker's 1956 revamp of the character) were painted by master Sexton Blake illustrator Eric Parker.

== Issues ==
Issue # 1 1st series (1915) of The Sexton Blake Library was published on 20 September 1915, entitled "The Yellow Tiger" and written by George Hamilton Teed. This issue featured popular Blake villains Wu Ling and Baron de Beauremon in an eleven-chapter story, costing 3d (1.25p). The story is 107 pages; a second story, "The Great Cup-Tie!" (not featuring Blake) completes the remainder of the issue's 120 pages.

Issues #2 and #4 1st series (1915) Ill-Gotten Gains and The Rajah's Revenge were written by Andrew Murray and featured master criminals Professor Kew and Count Ivor Carlac in their first team ups. The first four issues of the Sexton Blake Library were collected and re-issued in The Sexton Blake Detective Library in 1989 by Hawk Books.

Issue # 41 1st series (1917) The Mysterious Mr. Reece written by Robert Murray Graydon marked the debut of Mr. Reece, a criminal mastermind that would play a prominent role in the landmark Criminals' Confederation epic that spanned close to 70 tales over the next 10 years.

Issue #501 4th Series Caribbean Crisis (1962) is Michael Moorcock's first published novel.
