= Union Jack (magazine) =

British story paper for children

The Union Jack
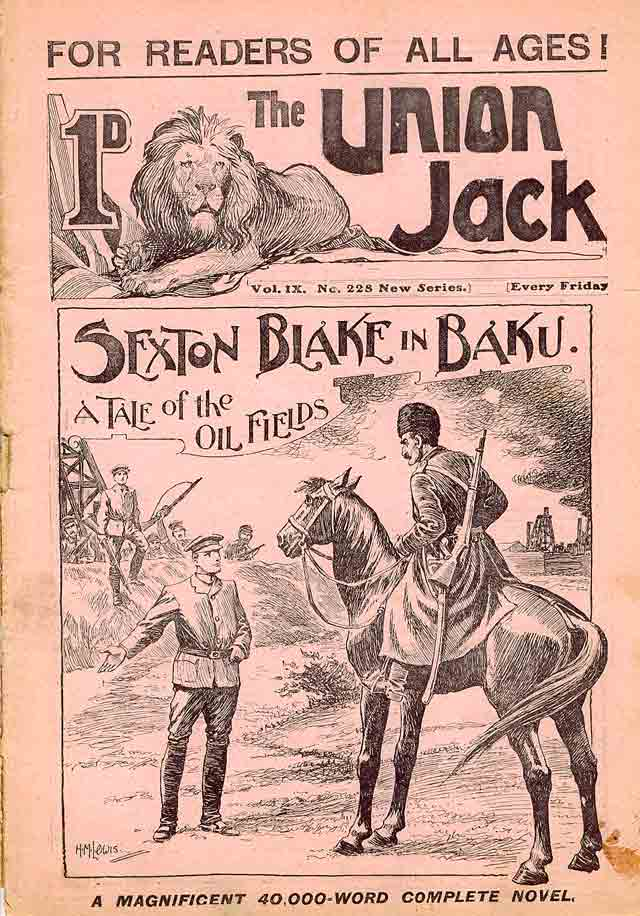
- Cover Sexton Blake in Baku, 1908
- Categories: Story paper
- Frequency: Weekly
- First issue: 1894; 131 years ago
- Final issue: 1933
- Company: Amalgamated Press
- Country: United Kingdom
- Based in: London
- Language: English

The Union Jack was a British story paper for children of the late 19th and early 20th centuries. There were two story papers called Union Jack. The first appeared in the 1880s but was only very short-lived. The name was then used by Alfred Harmsworth in 1894 for a new halfpenny story paper intended as a companion to the successful Halfpenny Marvel.

Harmsworth considered it his moral duty to put the "penny dreadfuls" out of business, though some considered his papers to simply be "halfpenny dreadfullers". The first issues of the Union Jack stated that it was a "Library of high class fiction". The editorial at the end of the very first issue stated "there will be nothing of the 'dreadful' type in our stories. No tales of boys rifling their employers' cash-boxes and making off to foreign lands, or other such highly immoral fiction products".

The paper claimed to be offering good value by "securing the very best authors" but only presenting their stories on cheap paper, rather than "wasting" money on colourful bindings and high-quality paper. However, the actual quality of the stories, especially in the early years, could be variable. Also many writers used pseudonyms to make it appear that more people were writing for the paper than actually were.

== Types of stories ==
The paper initially focused on Boy's Own type adventure stories, set mainly around the British Empire and at sea. The very first story was entitled "The Silver Arrow" and featured the many trials of the hero across mountains and jungles in Mexico to rescue his wife-to-be from red Indians. Another type of story featured in the early days was the detective story, with the second issue featuring a tale of Sexton Blake. This was, in some sources, quoted as the first ever Sexton Blake tale, however, earlier ones had been published in the Halfpenny Marvel in 1893, so it was actually the fourth.

Even by issue 7, the editorial page announced a system of voting for the story that was liked best, to allow the writers to provide more of the type of story the readers wanted. Issues beyond this tended to concentrate on westerns (though set in British territories in South America and Canada rather than the United States) and detective stories, including another Sexton Blake story in issue 15.

As the 1900s began, Sexton Blake stories began to appear in more and more issues, and major plot developments in the overall Sexton Blake saga took place in the Union Jack (for instance the introduction of Tinker, his assistant). The "new" Union Jack paper began in 1903, a continuation of the old paper but with the price increased to 1d and the issue numbers being restarted these issues where labeled "New Series" for many years. In 1905 the paper became "Sexton Blake's Own paper", and featured a Sexton Blake story in every issue. In the 1920s an article in the centre appeared called "Tinker's Notebook" which contained assorted items of interest, mainly relating to crime and punishment from around the world, supposedly related by Sexton Blake's young assistant (in early issues the editorial contained a selection of interesting facts). This section was renamed "From information received" in the 1930s, and dropped the pretence of being written by Tinker. The serials, too, took on crime/punishment themes, serialising books by writers such as Edgar Wallace. They also contained serials specifically written by the paper, which at times were also Sexton Blake stories.

The First World War, and declining circulation, saw the end of many papers which had published Sexton Blake stories; however the Sexton Blake Library (started in 1915) and Union Jack continued.

== History ==
By the end of the 1890s, the paper featured a single complete story in addition to a serial instalment. In 1904 the price was raised to 1d and the logo, until then variable, was changed to be the same for each issue, and featured a large image of a lion sitting on a Union Jack flag. Pink paper began to be used for the covers, perhaps to make the paper more readily identifiable on newsagents' shelves.

In 1918 the price increased to a "war time price" of 1½d. This price continued well after the First World War, however. In 1920 the price again increased, to 2d, and colour covers were introduced. The logo had, after the first world war, become variable again, but now settled down into a bold and simple "UNION JACK" title with rounded edges to the letters. The logo did often slightly vary in size and colour as it was painted directly onto the artwork used for the cover.

In 1933, the Union Jack came to an end with the final issue containing a Sexton Blake story called "The Land of Lost Men", though the cover announced "Sexton Blake's Secret – specially important announcement inside!". The issue was numbered 1531, but owing to the numbers being re-organised in 1903 it was actually the 2018th issue. After running 38 years, 10 months and 2 weeks, it was replaced by Detective Weekly, a larger paper with less-striking covers using fewer colours. This paper would continue until the introduction of paper rationing in 1940.

== Union Jack today ==
There remains a ready market for Union Jack papers today, with issues often available on eBay. They appeal to Sexton Blake fans, detective story fans in general (particularly later numbers), and to lovers of "Boy's Own" Victorian and Edwardian stories (particularly earlier numbers). Older issues on their own are scarce, but bound volumes occasionally appear. Later numbers from the 1920s and 30s are comparatively common.

== Reference in fiction ==
The Union Jack, as well as the Halfpenny Marvel and Pluck, are referenced by James Joyce in the short story "An Encounter", part of Joyce's Dubliners. These magazines are mentioned as highly popular among Dublin schoolboys of the time, who are especially attracted to the Wild West stories published in them. The story opens:

It was Joe Dillon who introduced the Wild West to us. He had a little library made up of old numbers of The Union Jack, Pluck and The Halfpenny Marvel. Every evening after school we met in his back garden and arranged Indian battles. He and his fat young brother Leo, the idler, held the loft of the stable while we tried to carry it by storm; or we fought a pitched battle on the grass. But, however well we fought, we never won siege or battle and all our bouts ended with Joe Dillon’s war dance of victory. His parents went to eight-o’clock mass every morning in Gardiner Street and the peaceful odour of Mrs Dillon was prevalent in the hall of the house. But he played too fiercely for us who were younger and more timid. He looked like some kind of an Indian when he capered round the garden, an old tea-cosy on his head, beating a tin with his fist and yelling:

“Ya! yaka, yaka, yaka!”

Everyone was incredulous when it was reported that he had a vocation for the priesthood. Nevertheless it was true.

The Union Jack is also mentioned in Philip Pullman's The Ruby in the Smoke, which is set in Victorian London.
