= Sexton Blake =

Fictional British detective who appeared in numerous publications

- First appearance: The Missing Millionaire (20 December 1893)
- Last appearance: Sexton Blake and The Demon God (1978)
- Created by: Harry Blyth (as Hal Meredeth)
- Portrayed by: Langhorn Burton; George Curzon; David Farrar; Geoffrey Toone; William Franklyn; Laurence Payne; Jeremy Clyde; Simon Jones

In-universe information
- Gender: Male
- Occupation: Detective
- Family: Henry Blake (brother); Nigel Blake (brother)
- Nationality: British

Sexton Blake is a fictional British detective, who appeared in stories published over eight decades from 1893 to 1978. Blake featured in more than 4,000 stories by approximately 200 different authors, making him one of the most prolifically chronicled characters in English literature. The detective's adventures spanned multiple formats including comic strips, novels, radio serials, silent films, and a 1960s ITV television series, reaching audiences across Britain and internationally in various languages.

Initially conceived as a Victorian gentleman detective, Blake evolved significantly over time, acquiring now-iconic elements like his Baker Street residence, his young assistant Tinker, his bloodhound Pedro, and his housekeeper Mrs. Bardell. While often compared to Sherlock Holmes, Blake's adventures typically featured more action-oriented plots and colourful adversaries, including memorable villains like Zenith the Albino, George Marsden Plummer, Dr. Huxton Rymer, Leon Kestrel, Waldo the Wonderman and the Criminals' Confederation. The character reached his peak popularity during the 1920s and early 1930s, particularly through publications like The Union Jack and The Sexton Blake Library, which at its height published five times monthly.

== Publication history ==
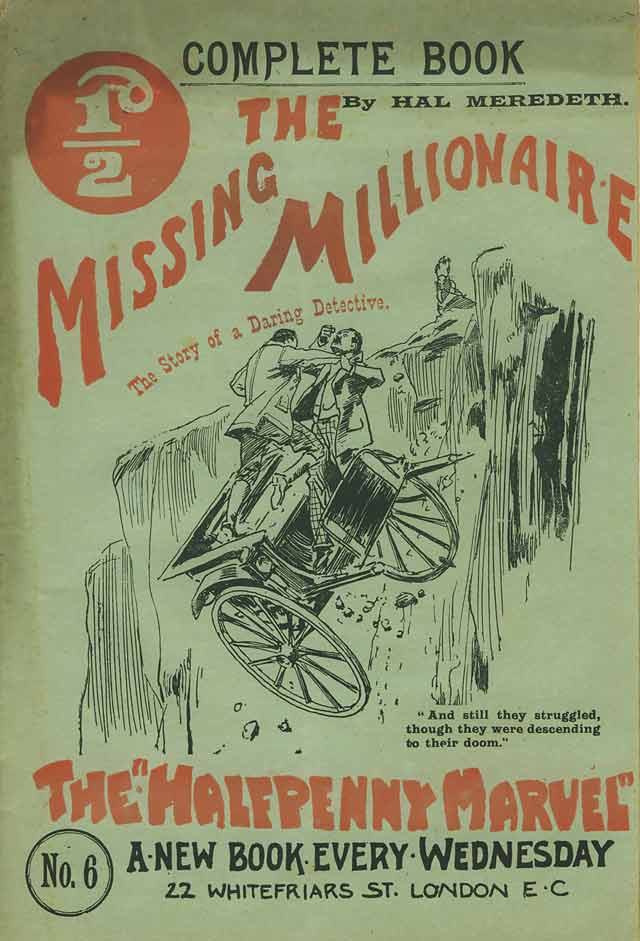
Cover of the first Sexton Blake tale

The first Sexton Blake story was "The Missing Millionaire". Written by Harry Blyth (using the pseudonym Hal Meredeth), it was published in The Halfpenny Marvel number 6, on 20 December 1893, a story paper owned by the Amalgamated Press. Blyth wrote six more Sexton Blake tales, three for the Marvel and three for The Union Jack a story paper launched in April 1894.

The Amalgamated Press purchased the copyright to Blake along with the first story Blyth had submitted and from 1895 onwards several authors began to pen Blake tales. From August 1905 Blake became the resident character in Union Jack, appearing in every issue until its transformation into the Detective Weekly in 1933. Blake continued as the main feature until Detective Weekly ended in 1940.

Sexton Blake; Foreman in The Boys' Friend (No. 487)

Blake's popularity began to grow during the Edwardian era, and he appeared in a number of different story papers. These appearances included serials in the tabloid sized Boys' Friend (1905), complete tales in the pocket-sized Penny Pictorial (from 1907 to 1913 (when that magazine ended), and short stories in Answers, (1908–1911) one of the Amalgamated Press' most popular papers. Writers from this era include: William Murray Graydon, Maxwell Scott, Norman Goddard, Cecil Hayter, D. H. Parry, E. W. Alais, W. J Lomax, and Michael Storm.

In the second decade of the 20th century, new writers joined the ranks and created the formidable master criminals that matched wits with Blake. These include Andrew Murray, Anthony Skene, Robert Murray Graydon, Edwy Searles Brooks and George Hamilton Teed.

=== Blake gets his own title ===
Longer tales of 60,000 words or so appeared in The Boys' Friend Library and the success of these led to the creation of The Sexton Blake Library in 1915. This digest-sized publication specialized in longer tales, and at the height of its popularity was published 5 times a month. It ran for just under 50 years.

The majority of Sexton Blake Library covers (prior to editor William Howard Baker's 1956 revamp of the character) were painted by master Sexton Blake illustrator Eric Parker

Writers who worked on Sexton Blake stories throughout this 53-year span included Charles Henry St. John Cooper, John Creasey, Jack Trevor Story, John G. Brandon Michael Moorcock, and (allegedly) Brian O'Nolan (aka Flann O'Brien and Myles Coppaleen.)

In 1959 Fleetway Publications acquired the rights to Sexton Blake adventures and published The Sexton Blake Library until the title's demise. The final tale, The Last Tiger, was published in June 1963.

In 1965, Blake editor William Howard Baker licensed the rights of the Sexton Blake character. He published the fifth series of The Sexton Blake Library independently via Mayflower-Dell Books, which ran until 1968. He then issued a final series of four Sexton Blake novels, using his Howard Baker Books imprint, in 1969. From 1968 to 1971 Valiant published new comic strips in the style of the Knockout strips from decades earlier. Blake's last original appearance was in Sexton Blake and the Demon God “a period thriller with ancient curses and cliff-hanger endings” in 1978.

=== Comic strips: 1939–1979 ===
Blake comic strips featured in The Knock-Out Comic (later Knock-Out Comic & Magnet and, finally, simply Knockout) from 1939 to 1960. The Blake strip was illustrated originally by artist Jos Walker and then by Alfred Taylor, who illustrated Blake's adventures for ten years. The undoubted highlight of Blake's 21-year run in Knockout was a 14-part 1949 strip drawn by Blake's greatest illustrator Eric Parker, entitled The Secret of Monte Cristo. This was Parker's only contribution to Blake's comic strip adventures.

There was one Super Detective Library story about Blake: issue 68 (published November 1955), featuring a comic strip entitled Sexton Blake's Diamond Hunt.

A final Sexton Blake comic strip (initiated to tie in with the 1967–1971 television show) featured in IPC's weekly boys' anthology Valiant, from January 1968 to May 1970.

A seven-part Blake comic strip featured in IPC's comic Tornado from March 1979 to May 1979. A contract dispute (subsequently resolved in IPC's favour) caused the Tornado editorial team to rename Blake "Victor Drago" (and Tinker & Pedro "Spencer & Brutus") for the duration of this strip.

=== Other publications ===
A series of 160-page Sexton Blake annuals, featuring old stories and new material, began in 1938 and lasted till 1941.

Four hardbacks designed for the younger market were published by Dean & Son Ltd during 1968. The third of these, Raffles' Crime in Gibraltar, portrayed Blake contending with A. J. Raffles, E.W. Hornung's amateur cracksman.

There were a few anthologies and reprints in the 80s and 90s.

In 2009, IPC's information manager, David Abbott, signed licenses to publish two Blake omnibus archive editions: The Casebook of Sexton Blake, published by Wordsworth Editions, and Sexton Blake, Detective published by Snowbooks.

In 2013, Obverse Books licensed the character and published The Silent Thunder Caper by Mark Hodder, the first book in a proposed sixth series of the Sexton Blake Library, The imprint had previously published a collection of short stories featuring Blake villain Zenith the Albino.

2018 saw an uptick in Sexton Blake reprints, with the first print novels published by Stillwoods Publishing, a Canadian publisher out of Nova Scotia.

In 2020 ROH Press began publishing Sexton Blake tales with Sexton Blake The Early Years, a collection of Blake's first cases.

That same year British publishers Rebellion Developments released a Sexton Blake special under its Treasury of British Comics imprint. They also produced four anthologies in 2020-21, each introduced by Blakeologist Mark Hodder.

=== Sexton Blake bibliography ===
The Sexton Blake bibliography is so extensive it has been divided into four sections. For a list of titles from the different Blake eras check out the links below.

1893–1911: The Victorian/Edwardian Era Sexton Blake bibliography
In this era Blake works solo and with a variety of partners and detectives. In 1904 he acquires a sidekick, a young boy named Tinker. The following year he moved to Baker Street and acquired a dog named Pedro and a landlady named Mrs Bardell.

1912–1945: The Master Criminals Era Sexton Blake bibliography part 2: 1912–1945
From 1913 onwards the master criminals reigned supreme, regularly matching with Blake.

1946–1978: The Post War Era Sexton Blake bibliography part 3: 1946–1978
The era of the New Order saw Blake become more of a James Bond type. It also saw the end of the Sexton Blake Library in 1963. There were a few attempts at bringing him back, but the last original Sexton Blake story was published in 1978.

1979–present: Revivals and Republications Sexton Blake bibliography part 4: 1979–present
Various publishers issued Blake novels and anthologies, collections of some of his most popular adventures.

== Blake's evolution ==
As the years passed, Blake's character experienced various permutations. The first descriptions and illustrations of him showed him to be "a middle-aged Victorian gentleman dressed in the typical clothing of the era and carrying a heavy walking stick".

At the start of his career in 1893 he was partnered with Jules Gervaise, a French detective who was also his mentor. By early in 1894 Blake was solving cases solo. During the remainder of the Victorian era he worked with various assistants Griff (half-man and beast) and a Chinese boy named We-Wee. He lived in a variety of places including Norfolk Street, Strand, New Inn Chambers, and Wych Street.

In The Lamp of Death (1894) Sexton Blake met Muriel Lane a woman who would eventually become his wife. His wife was referred to again in the Union Jack Christmas Number for 1901 then disappeared from the Blake canon forever. Blake remained a strict bachelor for the rest of his career.

In 1904 Blake moved to Baker Street, acquired an assistant named Tinker, a landlady named Martha Bardell and a dog named Pedro. Blake began more and more to resemble Sherlock Holmes. Blake was tall, lean, strong limbed, with hair receding at the temples, and with a high intellectual forehead. When indoors at Baker Street he wore a red dressing gown, smoked a briar pipe and had a favourite chair.

Throughout the Edwardian era he worked undercover at variety of jobs: reporter, cab driver, laundryman, sailor and cowboy, all of which were reflected in the titles of his adventures. In Sexton Blake KC it was disclosed that he was a fully trained lawyer; in "The Tattooed Eye" (21 November 1908) he says he is a duly qualified medical man but has never practised medicine.

Throughout his career Blake also visited many countries in North America, Africa, South America, the Middle East, Asia and Oceania. Blake spoke a variety of languages and often disguised himself as a local.

In 1908 Blake matched wits with George Marsden Plummer, the first of what would become a long line of master criminals. He was followed by Count Ivor Carlac in 1912, then Professor Kew, Prince Wu Ling, Zenith the Albino and many others.

The 1920s and early 1930s are considered Blake's Golden Age, a time when he matched wits with some of his greatest foes. By the mid 1940s most had disappeared.

Many of Blake's writers had been men of adventure who had travelled the world. When World War II started, they enlisted, leaving just a small group of writers behind (with the addition of the occasional guest writer). Consequently, the standard of Blake's stories suffered.

In November 1955, William Howard Baker became editor of the Sexton Blake Library and, during 1956, introduced a successful update of the Blake formula. The Sexton Blake Library found new popularity with faster-moving, more contemporary stories (often influenced by American pulp fiction).

Blake, who had been relocated a number of times over the years, was relocated to a suite of plush offices in Berkeley Square (while retaining lodgings at Baker Street) and acquired a secretary, Paula Dane, who became a not-quite-love interest for Blake.

Tinker was no longer a boy assistant, but a mature young man who went by his full name Edward Carter. Blake's office receptionist, Marion Lang, was introduced as his female counterpart.

Covers, which had become rather staid during the early 1950s, became much more dynamic and a new group of authors was commissioned.

Baker remained as editor until 1963 (his last story was "The Last Tiger") before becoming Blake's licensor/publisher and continuing to oversee Blake's print adventures until January 1970.

There were a few reprints in anthologies in the 1970s and 1980s. The new millennium has seen an uptick in reprints.

== Blake's associates ==
Blake's first associate from The Halfpenny Marvel No. 6 ("The Missing Millionaire") is the Frenchman Jules Gervaise, who gives him the first recorded case. By issue No. 7 ("A Christmas Crime"), they initiate an investigative company together. In the third story of issue No. 11 ("A Golden Ghost"), Gervaise is not mentioned.

=== Blake's team ===
In Union Jack number 53, in a story titled "Cunning Against Skill" (1904), (written by W. J. Lomax under the pen-name of Herbert Maxwell), Blake picked up a wiry street-wise orphan as an assistant who was known only as Tinker until the 1950s. With the popularity of school stories during the early 1900s, Tinker's schooldays were chronicled in issues 229 and 232. Over the years, Tinker changed from a boy and good fighter to a rugged and capable young man. As well as assisting the "guv'nor", as he called Blake, Tinker kept Blake's crime files up to date with clippings from the daily newspapers, in addition to assisting Blake in his fully equipped crime laboratory. The Edwardian British private detective Herbert Marshall was a friend of one of the Blake authors', Charles Henry St John Cooper (1869–1926), and stated that Cooper had based the character of Tinker on Marshall's own teenaged assistant Henry Drummond. Drummond sold newspapers in Northumberland Avenue in order to support his widowed mother until, aged just 14, he was offered a job by Marshall. Drummond died in around 1905 from tuberculosis, aged 19.

In 1905, Blake's bustling housekeeper Mrs Bardell (created by William Murray Graydon, who also created Pedro the bloodhound), was introduced and remained until the end. Her misuse of the English language was legendary in stories – she was a gifted cook and would always be on hand if a client needed food or a cup of tea. Mrs Bardell even featured as the main character in stories such as: "The Mystery Of Mrs Bardell's Xmas Pudding" in 1925 and "Mrs Bardell's Xmas Eve" in 1926.

In Union Jack number 100 (9 September 1905), a story entitled "The Dog Detective" introduced Blake's faithful, wise and ferocious bloodhound, Pedro. Pedro was originally owned by Rafael Calderon, ex-president of a South American state, but after performing various services for Calderon, Blake was given Pedro by Calderon, using the guise of "Mr. Nemo". Pedro tracked many villains to their lairs in subsequent stories.

Another notable non-human associate (and almost a character in itself) was Blake's bullet-proof Rolls-Royce, named The Grey Panther (introduced at a time when most other sleuths were still taking cabs). For a short while, Blake also flew a Moth monoplane (also called The Grey Panther and designed by Blake himself).

== Blake's enemies ==
Sexton Blake had a large rogues gallery of supervillains from around the globe. Some of the most famous included:

- George Marsden Plummer (created by Ernest Semphill in 1908), a dishonest Detective Sergeant at Scotland Yard, opposed Blake, but like many others, Plummer ended in a police cell. Unlike many before him, he repeatedly escaped and became Blake's arch-enemy.
- Count Ivor Carlac (created by Andrew Murray in 1912) was a Polish nobleman and former pilot who turned to a life of crime. He was highly cunning, a master of disguise, and utterly ruthless.
- Professor Francis Kew (created by Andrew Murray in 1913) A highly respected surgeon who moonlighted as an arch criminal. He teamed up with Carlac in 1916, and the two would often match wits against Blake over the next twenty years.
- Dr Huxton Rymer (created by George Hamilton Teed in 1913) a world renowned surgeon turned master criminal.
- Prince Wu Ling (created by George Hamilton Teed in 1913) a former Chinese royal bent on world domination.
- Waldo the Wonderman (created by Edwy Searles Brooks in 1918), a circus strongman who had tremendous strength, could contort his body like a rubber man, and was insensitive to pain. He first appeared as a villain and ended in later stories as a friend of Blake's, helping him with a number of cases. But despite his reformation, he continued to steal money (but his victims were now blackmailers, swindlers, and other no-good members of the underworld).
- Zenith the Albino (created by Anthony Skene in 1919) the Byronic master thief.
- The Criminals' Confederation (created by Robert Murray Graydon in 1919) was an insidious criminal organisation that spanned the globe. The Confederation featured in 50 tales from 1919 to 1926.

The type of villain Blake opposed changed with the times (as did Blake himself). After World War II, his opponents became more ordinary, their personalities and motives less fantastic. Veteran writers John Hunter and Walter Tyrer excelled at this type of writing, but others failed to maintain their standards.

== Blake's allies ==
Sexton Blake also teamed up with a variety of police officers, private detectives and other assorted crime fighters from time to time. Some of the most popular include:

- Detective-Inspector Will Spearing (created by Norman Goddard) Blake's first ally from Scotland Yard. Spearing made his debut in Sexton Blake PC in 1905.
- Sir Richard Losely and Lobangu (created by Cecil Hayter in 1907) Sir Richard was a British explorer and Blake's former school mate. Lobangu is the mighty chief of the Etbaia tribe of Zulus.
- Honourable John Lawless (created by Andrew Murray) Lawless is an adventurer and proud Britisher who made his debut in The Boundary Raiders (1916). Though not officially employed by the Empire he often fights for King and Country
- Detective-Inspector Coutts (created by Robert Murray Graydon) Coutts made his debut in The Hidden Hand (1916) and fought alongside Blake against the Criminals' Confederation.
- The Bat (created by Robert Murray Graydon) Dirk Dolland, alias the Bat, made his debut in The Hidden Hand (1916). At first a highly talented cracksman the Bat eventually became a strong ally of Blake's against the Criminals' Confederation.
- Nelson Lee (created by Maxwell Scott) Like Blake, Lee was a private investigator created in the 1890s. The two first appeared together in Christmas Clues in 1895. They would team up again in The Winged Terror (1909) and in several tales in 1918.
- Mademoiselle Yvonne Cartier (created by George Hamilton Teed) was at first a Blake foe then a loyal ally and eventually became a detective. She made her debut in Beyond Reach of the Law (1913) and appeared in Blake tales until 1926.
- James "Granite" Grant and Mademoiselle Julie (created by W. W. Sayer) Grant of the British Secret Service and Mademoiselle Julie of the French Secret Service made their debuts in 1920 and fought alongside in numerous adventures for the next six years. The tales were reprinted in the 1930s.

Other associates included Derek "Splash" Page of the Daily Radio; Ruff Hanson, a tough American investigator (both created by Gwyn Evans), and Blake's friends at Scotland Yard: Chief Detective Inspector Lennard, and Superintendent Venner.

== Bibliography ==
=== Stories ===
- "Sexton Blake and the Demon God" (1978) John Garforth
- "Sexton Blake and the White Fairy" (2000) John Hall
- "Sexton Blake and the Curse of Ozymandias" (2000) John Hall
- "The Seance at Stillwater Mansion" (2006) Mark Hodder
- "The Return of the Yellow Beetle" (2006) Mark Hodder
- "Special Dispensation 5 and 6" (Plus 5, Appendix 1) (2006) Mark Hodder
- "The Case of the Left Hand of Thoth" (2006) Mark Hodder
- "The Shades of Pemberley" (2007) Win Scott Eckert
- "The Case of the Flying Submarine" (2009) Mark Hodder
- "Pedro Pulls Through!" (2009) Mark Hodder
- "The Day of the Dragon" (2009) Mark Hodder
- "The Mystery of Devil's Forest" (2009) Mark Hodder
- "Sexton Blake Versus Doctor Fu Manchu" (2009) Mark Hodder
- "The Silent Thunder Caper" (2014) Mark Hodder
- "Sexton Blake and the Ghost of Otis Maunder" (2018) David Friend

=== Manuscripts ===
- Regan's Rum Racket by Edwy Searles Brooks
- The Doomed Valley by Rex Dolphin
- The Case of the Missing Diplomat by Dail Ambler
- Riviera Racket by W. Howard Baker (?) as Peter Saxon
- A Pinch of Sniff by W. Howard Baker (?) as Peter Saxon
- The Odd Affair of Diane Starr by W. Howard Baker (?) as Peter Saxon
- The Branded Blonde by W. Howard Baker (?) as Peter Saxon

=== Collections ===
- Sexton Blake: Star of Union Jack and Detective Weekly (1972)
- Crime at Christmas (1974)
- Sexton Blake's Early Cases (1976)
- Sexton Blake Wins (1986)
- The Sexton Blake Casebook (1987)
- The Sexton Blake Detective Library (1989)
- The Casebook of Sexton Blake (2009)
- Sexton Blake, Detective (2009)
- Sexton Blake and the Great War (2020)
- Sexton Blake Versus the Master Crooks (2020)
- Sexton Blake's Allies (2020)
- Sexton Blake On the Home Front (2021)
- Sexton Blake's New Order (2021)
- Sexton Blake: The Early Years (2020)
- Sexton Blake: The Answers Casebook (2020)
- Sexton Blake: Friends and Allies (2020)
- Sexton Blake: The First Super Villains (2020)
- Sexton Blake: The Master Criminals (2020)
- Sexton Blake: Yvonne's Vengeance (2020)
- Sexton Blake: Rymer and Wu Ling (2020)
- Sexton Blake: Wu Ling Strikes Again (2020)
- Sexton Blake: Cunning Schemes (2020)
- Sexton Blake: The Storm Files (2021)
- Sexton Blake: The Plummer Files (2021)
- Sexton Blake: The Kew Files (2021)
- Sexton Blake & Nelson Lee (2021)
- Sexton Blake: The Claire Delisle Files (2022)
- Sexton Blake: The Clique of Death (2022)
- Sexton Blake: Spy Stories (2023)
- Sexton Blake: Schooldays #1 (2023)
- Sexton Blake: Schooldays #2 (2023)
- Sexton Blake: Schooldays #3 (2023)

=== The Criminals' Confederation series ===
- Sexton Blake: The Bat Files (2021)
- Sexton Blake: The Bat Files #2 (2021)
- Sexton Blake: The Bat Files #3 (2021)
- Sexton Blake: The Bat Files #4 (2021)
- Sexton Blake: Confederation Rising (2021)
- Sexton Blake: The Sinister Island Saga (2021)
- Sexton Blake: Yvonne Joins the Fight (2022)
- Sexton Blake: Beware the Shadow (2022)
- Sexton Blake: Plots and Intrigues (2022)
- Sexton Blake: Reversals of Fortune (2022)
- Sexton Blake: The Rival Presidents (2022)
- Sexton Blake: Reece's Republic (2022)
- Sexton Blake: Twists in the Trail (2022)
- Sexton Blake: Final Curtain (2022)

== Adaptations ==
=== Stage ===
There were several Sexton Blake stage plays:

- The Case of the Coiners (1907), was the earliest produced
- Percy Holmshaw produced Sexton Blake: A Detective Story in Four Acts in 1931. Blake was played by Arthur Wontner, whose performance then led to him being cast as Sherlock Holmes in five films.

=== Movies ===
==== Silent movies ====
Year	Film title	Starring		Directed by	Novel	Notes
Year	Film title	Blake	Tinker	Directed by	Novel	Notes
1909	Sexton Blake	Charles Douglas Carlile		Charles Douglas Carlile	Five Years After by William Murray Graydon	12 minutes
1909	The Council of Three	Charles Douglas Carlile		S. Wormald		
1910 serial	Lady Candale's Diamonds	Charles Douglas Carlile		S. Wormald		
1910 serial	The Jewel Thieves Run to Earth by Sexton Blake	Charles Douglas Carlile		S. Wormald	Possibly The Jewel Thieves by Ernest Sempill?	
1914	Sexton Blake Vs Baron Kettler	Hugh Moss		Hugh Moss	Possibly The Adventure of the Lady Typist?	
1914	The Clue of the Wax Vesta	Arthur Dean			The Vengeance Series by George Hamilton Teed. The title is drawn from a clue in Teed's The Missing Guests.	30 minutes
1914 serial	The Mystery of the Diamond Belt	Philip Kay	Lewis Carlton	Charles Raymond	The Mystery of the Diamond Belt by Lewis Carlton	Manufactured in England by F. Bernard Davidson. Exclusively controlled by The Kinematograph Trading Co. Sexton Blake vs George Marsden Plummer
1914 serial	The Kaiser's Spies	Philip Kay	Lewis Carlton	Charles Raymond		
1914 serial	Britain's Secret Treaty	Philip Kay	Lewis Carlton	Charles Raymond	The Case of the German Admiral by Andrew Murray	
1915 serial	The Stolen Heirlooms	Harry Lorraine	Bert Rex	Charles Raymond	Possibly The Case of the Missing Heirlooms by Cecil Hayter?	
1915 serial	The Counterfeiters	Harry Lorraine	Bert Rex	Charles Raymond	The Counterfeiters by J.W. Bobin	
1915 serial	The Great Cheque Fraud	Harry Lorraine	Bert Rex	Charles Raymond	The Great Cheque Fraud	
1915 serial	The Thornton Jewel Mystery	Harry Lorraine	Bert Rex	Charles Raymond	Possibly The Marfield Jewel Mystery?	
1919	Further Exploits of Sexton Blake: The Mystery of the S. S. Olympic	Douglas Payne	Neil Warrington	Harry Lorraine	The Mystery of the S. S. Olympic by Robert Murray Graydon	
1922	The Doddington Diamonds	Douglas Payne		Jack Denton	Possibly The Conniston Diamonds by G. H. Teed?	
1928 serial	The Clue of the Second Goblet	Langhorne Burton	Mickey Brantford	George A. Cooper	The Clue of the Second Goblet by G. H. Teed	
1928 serial	Blake the Lawbreaker	Langhorne Burton	Mickey Brantford	George A. Cooper		
1928 serial	Sexton Blake, Gambler	Langhorne Burton	Mickey Brantford	George J. Banfield		
1928 serial	Silken Threads	Langhorne Burton	Mickey Brantford	Leslie Eveleigh		
1928 serial	The Great Office Mystery	Langhorne Burton	Mickey Brantford		The Great Office Mystery by Jack Lewis (Lewis Jackson)	
1928 serial	The Mystery of the Silent Death	Langhorne Burton	Mickey Brantford	Leslie Eveleigh	Possibly The Menace of the Silent Death by E. J. Murray?	

There were also spoof films titled Sexton Pimple (1914), starring the comedian Fred Evans, and Sherlock Blake-The Terrible 'Tec (1916) starring Billy Merson.

==== Talkies ====
- Sexton Blake and the Bearded Doctor was the first of three Blake talkies produced during the 1930s. Based on a novel by Rex Hardinge, this movie featured George Curzon as Sexton Blake and Tony Sympson as Tinker.
- Sexton Blake and the Mademoiselle (featuring Mlle. Roxanne as the female villain from the books), from a story by G H Teed, followed soon afterwards.
- The third production was Sexton Blake and the Hooded Terror with Tod Slaughter playing the villain.
- Two movies Meet Sexton Blake and The Echo Murders were made in 1945. They were directed by John Harlow, and featured David Farrar as Blake. (Farrar had played a small role in Sexton Blake and the Hooded Terror.)
- The Hammer film Murder at Site 3 (1958) featuring Geoffrey Toone did not launch a series.

=== Radio ===
- On 26 January 1939, BBC Radio broadcast a serial named Enter Sexton Blake, featuring George Curzon as Blake and Brian Lawrence as Tinker.
- 30 March 1940, BBC broadcast A Case for Sexton Blake, adapted by Francis Durbridge.
- During 1967, BBC Radio 4 broadcast a popular series of Sexton Blake radio adventures starring William Franklyn as Blake, David Gregory as Tinker, and Heather Chasen as Blake's secretary, Paula Dane. Broadcast on Thursday nights at 7.00pm, this series of 17 programmes (which ran weekly from 24 August to 14 December) was scripted by Donald Stuart, devised for radio by Philip Ridgeway, and produced by veteran BBC radio producer Alastair Scott Johnston.
- On 6 March 2006, after discussions between noted British radio producer Dirk Maggs and IPC publishing director Andrew Sumner, Maggs recorded a half-hour Adventures of Sexton Blake pilot show for his newly formed Perfectly Normal Productions. This humorous satire of Blake's adventures featured Simon Jones as Blake, Wayne Forester as Tinker, and a returning William Franklyn, in one of his final performances, as the elderly Blake (who narrates the adventure). As a result of the success of this pilot, Maggs directed a new series of Blake adventures for BBC Radio 2. The Adventures of Sexton Blake again featured Jones and Forester, joined by June Whitfield as Mrs Bardell, and Graham Hoadly as Professor Kew. The series was written by Jonathan Nash and Mil Millington and broadcast, in six weekly 15 minute instalments, during late summer 2009. An extended version of the complete series was released on CD by BBC Audiobooks on 10 September 2009. David Quantick's accompanying Blake documentary, The Hunt For Sexton Blake (also produced by Perfectly Normal Productions) was broadcast on BBC Radio 2 before the series started.

=== Television ===
==== Sexton Blake (1967–71) ====
ITV broadcast Rediffusion/Thames Television's Sexton Blake featuring Laurence Payne as Blake and Roger Foss as Tinker from Monday 25 September 1967 to Wednesday 13 January 1971. In keeping with Sexton Blake's classic print adventures, Payne's Blake drove a white Rolls-Royce named "The Grey Panther" and owned a bloodhound named Pedro. The show was produced originally by Ronald Marriott for Associated Rediffusion, with Thames Television assuming production in 1968.

Pedro was played by one or more bloodhounds (bitches), which doubled as 'Henry', for Chunky dog food advertisements with Clement Freud, and were owned by the then secretary of the Bloodhound Club, Mrs Bobbie Edwards.

During rehearsals for the show in 1968, Laurence Payne was blinded in his left eye by a rapier.

Typical of the TV series's sometimes-fantastic storylines (all of which lasted 2–6 episodes) was 1968's "The Invicta Ray" in which a villain dressed in a costume and hood of sackcloth-like material and, under the rays of The Invicta Ray, became invisible so that he could commit crimes without being seen.

Of 50 episodes, only the first episode is thought to exist still.

- Season One: The Find-The-Lady Affair. 4 episodes. Monday 25 September 1967 to Monday 16 October 1967.
- Season One: Knave of Diamonds. 5 episodes. Monday 23 October 1967 to Monday 20 November.
- Season One: The Great Tong Mystery. 4 episodes. Monday 27 November 1967 to Monday 18 December 1967.
- Season One: The Vanishing Snowman. Christmas Special. Monday 25 December 1967.
- Season One: House of Masks. 4 episodes. Monday 1 January 1968 to Monday 22 January 1968.
- Season One: The Invicta Ray. 4 episodes. Monday 29 January 1968 to Monday 19 February 1968.
- Season Two: The Case of the Gasping Goldfish. 2 episodes. Thursday 14 November 1968 to Thursday 21 November 1968.
- Season Two: Return of the Scorpion. 2 episodes. Thursday 28 November 1968 to Thursday 5 December 1968.
- Season Two: The Great Train Robbery. 2 episodes. Thurs 16 January 1969 to Thurs 23 January 1969.
- Season Two: The Great Soccer Mystery. 3 episodes. Thurs 30 January 1969 to Thurs 13 Feb 1969.
- Season Three: Sexton Blake and Captain Nemesis. 3 episodes. Wed 8 Oct 1969 to Wed 22 Oct 1969.
- Season Three: Sexton Blake verses The Gangsters. 3 episodes. Wed 29 Oct 1969 to Wed 12 Nov 1969.
- Season Three: Sexton Blake and the Frightened Man. 2 eps. Wed 19 Nov 1969 to Wed 26 Nov 1969.
- Season Three: Sexton Blake and the Undertaker. 3 episodes. Wed 3 Dec 1969 to Wed 17 Dec 1969.
- Season Three: Sexton Blake and the Toy Family. 2 episodes. Wed 23 Dec 1969 to Wed 30 Dec 1969.
- Season Four: Sexton Blake and the Puff Adder. 6 episodes. Wed 9 Dec 1970 to Wed 13 January 1971.

The cast:

- Laurence Payne as Sexton Blake
- Roger Foss as Edward Clark (Tinker)
- Dorothea Phillips as Mrs Bardell
- Ernest Clark as Inspector Coutts
- Leonard Sachs as Inspector Van Steen
- Meredith Edwards as Inspector (Taff) Evans
- Eric Lander as Inspector Cardish
- Charles Morgan as Inspector Davies

==== Sexton Blake and the Demon God (1978) ====
Simon Raven's Sexton Blake and the Demon God was a six-part television serial produced by Barry Letts for the BBC in 1978. The serial was broadcast by BBC One at tea-time from Sunday 10 September 1978 until Sunday 15 October 1978 and was directed by Roger Tucker.

Jeremy Clyde played Blake, with Philip Davis appearing as Tinker and Barbara Lott playing Mrs Bardell.

==== The Sexton Blake Library (Obverse Books) ) ====
- Sexton Blake and the Silent Thunder Caper by Mark Hodder (2014)
- Zenith Lives! (2012)

=== Other Blake appearances ===
- A seven-minute 78 rpm record, titled Murder on the Portsmouth Road, had a script written by Donald Stuart and featured Arthur Wontner (who also featured as Sherlock Holmes in early British talkies) as Blake.
- Michael Moorcock used Blake as the basis for The Metatemporal Detective, Seaton Begg. Moorcock also borrowed the character of Zenith the Albino, both as partial inspiration for Elric of Melniboné and as an actual character (who was implied to be an avatar of Elric's). Both Begg and Zenith featured in Obverse Books' collection Zenith Lives! (2012), which includes a new Begg/Zenith novella from Moorcock. Seaton Begg was also the lead character in the 2019 novella The Immortal Seaton Begg, which was released as part of Sextet (An Obverse Celebration), a series of six interconnected novellas released in the second half of 2019 to celebrate Obverse Books' tenth anniversary.
- Dorothy L. Sayers features Sexton Blake stories in her novel Murder Must Advertise as the preferred literature of a young office boy helping Lord Peter Wimsey solving the case.
- Bengali novelist Dinendra Kumar Roy wrote 217 stories in Bengali, following the Sexton Blake series in the name of Robert Blake.
