= Frank Richards =

Frank Richards may refer to:

- Frank Richards (performer), vaudeville performer
- the pseudonym of Charles Hamilton (writer) (1876–1961), writer of the Greyfriars School stories
  - the pseudonym of many "substitute writers" of Greyfriars stories, such as Edwy Searles Brooks (1889–1965)
- Frank Richards (cricketer) (1863–1926), Australian cricketer
- Frank Richards (football manager) (c. 1880–1963), manager of English football clubs
- Frank Richards (actor) (1909–1992), American actor
- Frank H. Richards (1858–1937), American politician
- Frank Richards (British Army soldier) (1883–1961), soldier and author

== See also ==
- Frank Richard
- Franklin Richards (disambiguation)
- Francis Richards (disambiguation)
- Frances Richards (disambiguation)
