= Dixon Hawke =

Fictional detective in numerous boys' story papers

- First appearance: "The Great Hotel Mystery" (The Saturday Post #347, 6 April 1912)
- Created by: Unknown; commissioned for DC Thomson

In-universe information
- Gender: Male
- Occupation: Detective
- Nationality: British

Dixon Hawke was a fictional detective who was featured in the DC Thomson publications from 1912 to 2000. Created in 1912 by an unknown author for DC Thomson, he appeared in various publications including The Saturday Post, The Sunday Post, Adventure, The Sporting Post, Topical Times, The Evening Telegraph and The Dixon Hawke Library.

In 1989, researcher and author W. O. G. Lofts stated that Hawke had been running continuously on a weekly basis for well over 76 years, and "so must be credited with being the longest consecutive running character of all time". Lofts estimated that Hawke had appeared in some 5000 stories.

Eleven years later, Hawke had appeared in over 5,500 tales, making him the most published fictional detective of all time, beating contemporaries Sexton Blake and Nick Carter. Based on that number, Sunday Post author Steve Finan speculated that more stories have been written about Dixon Hawke than any other fictional character in the English language.

== History and background ==
Dixon Hawke made his debut in "The Great Hotel Mystery" in The Saturday Post #347 on 6 April 1912. A Scotsman, at the start of his career he lived on Bath Street in Glasgow. He had an assistant named Nipper, a street urchin who sold newspapers. His police associate was Detective Chief Inspector Baxter. Hawke was a tall detective with an aquiline nose, wore a dressing gown, and smoked a blackened briar.

In 1919, publisher DC Thomson decided to move Hawke to London. There he acquired a new assistant named Tommy Burke, and a bloodhound named Solomon. They lived on Dover Street with a Japanese valet/chauffeur named Wong. Their landlady was named Mrs. Martha Benvie. His police associate was Inspector Duncan McPhinney of New Scotland Yard, introduced in the very first issue of the Dixon Hawke Library

Following in the footprints of the Sexton Blake and Tinker, Nelson Lee and Nipper partnerships of the early Edwardian era, the adult detective/boy assistant became a popular pairing in the boys story papers from 1910 onwards. Among the many imitators Hawke and Burke were among the better known.

So widely known was Hawke in British popular culture of the 1930s, that his name featured in W. H. Auden's long poem The Orators along with other fictional detectives, Sexton Blake, Bulldog Drummond, Sherlock Holmes, Hercule Poirot and Edgar Wallace's The Four Just Men. The full mention reads:

"From the immense bat-shadow of home;
from the removal of land-marks:
from appeals for love and
from the comfortable words of the devil,
O Dixon Hawke, deliver us."

== Dixon Hawke gets his own titles ==

On 14 July 1919 The Dixon Hawke Library made its debut. It ran for 576 issues until its demise in 1941. The first story was entitled The Flying Major and introduced young female reporter Molly Connor.

Author and biographer Steve Holland has identified the author of The Flying Major as Herbert Ford Inman (1884-1949). He also identified Inman as the possible creator of Hawke's bloodhound Solomon in issue #7 of The Dixon Hawke Library.

The last issue was published on 27 December 1941, and featured two tales: The Clue of the Chinese Puzzle and The Brothers of Justice.

Hawke also featured in Dixon Hawke's Case Book, collections of short stories published annually or bi-annually from 1938 to 1953. The case books were oversized paperbacks and contained a collection of 25 to 40 short stories.

Impact

In their introduction to The Men Behind Boys' Fiction (1970) Lofts and Adley pay tribute to the DC Thomson papers, describing them as "the biggest rivals to the Amalgamated Press and Fleetway Publications" the dominant publisher of boys' and girls' story papers.

The Dixon Hawke Library was a rival to The Sexton Blake Library. It was followed by Adventure in 1921, another weekly papers that featured the adventures of Dixon Hawke and his assistant Tommy Burke. Lofts and Adley also noted that though The Dixon Hawke Library and Adventure were no longer in print, Dixon Hawke was still "going strong" in the Scottish Daily Post.

The Dixon Hawke Library, Adventure, The Rover, The Wizard, and The Hotspur all had exceptionally long runs and became known as Thomson's "Big Five". Authors wrote for hire and their stories were kept to a very high standard, many authors reporting that it was much more difficult to write for DC Thomson than it was for their arch-rival the Amalgamated Press.

Though the writing in "the Big Five" reflected the attitudes of the era, some of which modern readers may find problematic, Lofts and Adley viewed DC Thomson's overall output very positively, stating that, "All the stories were clean and entertaining and gripped the young reader, and they had a high moral standard. They sold in millions, and DC Thomson editors deserve the highest possible praise for contributing – by thus entertaining the young – to a part of our social history."

== Hawke's rogues' gallery ==
Like his contemporaries Sexton Blake and Nelson Lee, Dixon Hawke had a large rogues' gallery of villains.

Among them were Marko the Miracle Man created by Edwy Searles Brooks a criminal mastermind with super strength who matched wits with Hawke over the course of fourteen years. In all Brooks wrote 26 Dixon Hawke tales.

As he did for Sexton Blake and Nelson Lee, George Hamilton Teed created Hawke's greatest female foe, Nicolette Lazare, the Black Angel. She made her first appearance in The Terror from Devil's Island in The Dixon Hawke Library #327 in June 1932. Teed wrote five stories featuring her between 1932 and 1935.

Other villains include
Dr. Den the Arch Rogue
The Six Wolves of Doom
The Faceless Men
Lucky Lorrancie
Koojah Khan the Man of Mystery
The Red Avenger
The Masked Rider
the Human Whirlwind
the India-Rubber Man
the Blue Streak

Some of the criminal organisations he faced include:
The League of the Silver Horseshoe
The League of the Crimson Diamond
The League of the Purple Dragon

There was no shortage of yellow peril threats. These included the Yellow Ghost, and Fang Chu among others.

Many authors penned Hawke tales including, John G. Brandon, Edwy Searles Brooks, John Creasey, Anthony Skene, T.C.H. Jacobs, Elizabeth Smith Alexander, Lewis Carlton, George Hamilton Teed, Gilbert Chester, Frank Howe, Francis Addington Symonds, Rex Hardinge, Reginald Thomas, Lester Bidston, Frank Howe, George Goodchild, William Edward Vickers, and W.W. Sayer. Richard Goyne claimed to have written more tales for the Dixon Hawke Library than any other author,

== New collections ==
In 2017 DC Thomson published two collections of Dixon Hawke tales, marking his first republication in almost twenty years.

- Dixon Hawke – The Case Of The Missing American and Other Short Stories 978-1845356996
- Dixon Hawke – The Case Of The Smuggled Diamonds and Other Short Stories 978-1845356989

In 2018 a series of 7 anthologies of short stories were published by Jason Charles.

In 2020 The Terror of Devil's Island, the first tale featuring Nicolette Lazare was published in Moriarty's Rivals: 14 Female Masterminds 978-1987886672
