= The Nelson Lee Library =

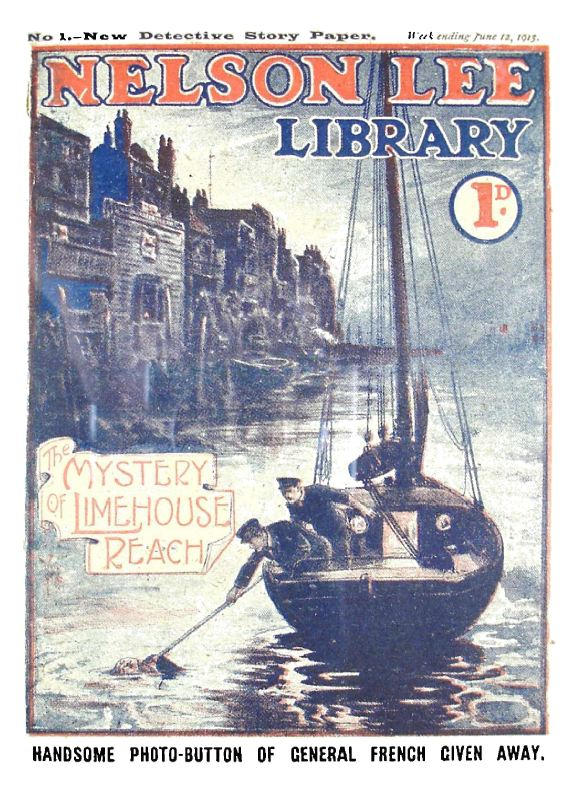
- Cover The Nelson Lee Library #1 from 1915
- Categories: Story paper
- Frequency: Weekly
- First issue: 1915; 111 years ago
- Final issue: 1933
- Company: Amalgamated Press
- Country: United Kingdom
- Based in: London
- Language: English

The Nelson Lee Library was a story paper of the first third of the 20th century, published by Amalgamated Press. It featured the adventures of private detective Nelson Lee and his boy assistant Nipper.

== Overview ==
Nelson Lee was created by John William Staniforth, writing under the name Maxwell Scott, in 1894. Lee made his debut in A Dead Man’s Secret in The Halfpenny Marvel #46. The detective was an immediate sensation and continued to feature in many of the Amalgamated Press papers over the next twenty years. In 1915 the Amalgamated Press acquired the exclusive right to use the name Nelson Lee from Staniforth for £50. That same year it launched The Nelson Lee Library, a weekly paper devoted to stories about Nelson Lee and Nipper. Despite wartime restrictions, the paper achieved a circulation of 70,000 within its first three months.

The first issue of The Nelson Lee Library was published on 12 June 1915, entitled The Mystery of Limehouse Reach and written by Sexton Blake writer A. C. Murray. Many other popular Blake writers would pen Lee tales including William Murray Graydon, William J. Bayfield, George Hamilton Teed, Norman Goddard, and Edwy Searles Brooks.

Series 1 ran from 12 June 1915 until 24 April 1926, a total of 568 issues.

Series 2 ran from 1 May 1926 until 18 January 1930, a total of 194 issues.

Series 3 ran from 25 January 1930 until 18 February 1933, a total of 161 issues.

Series 4 ran from 25 February 1933 until 12 August 1933. The Nelson Lee Library then merged with The Gem.

== A few issues of note ==
Maxwell Scott wrote just four adventures for the paper that bore his greatest creation's name, A Miscarriage of Justice (1915), The Convict's Dilemma (1915), In Borrowed Plumes (1915), and When Rogues Fall Out (1916).

The Spendthrift was George Hamilton Teed's first Nelson Lee tale. It was followed by Twenty Fathoms Deep Edwy Searles Brooks debut Lee tale.

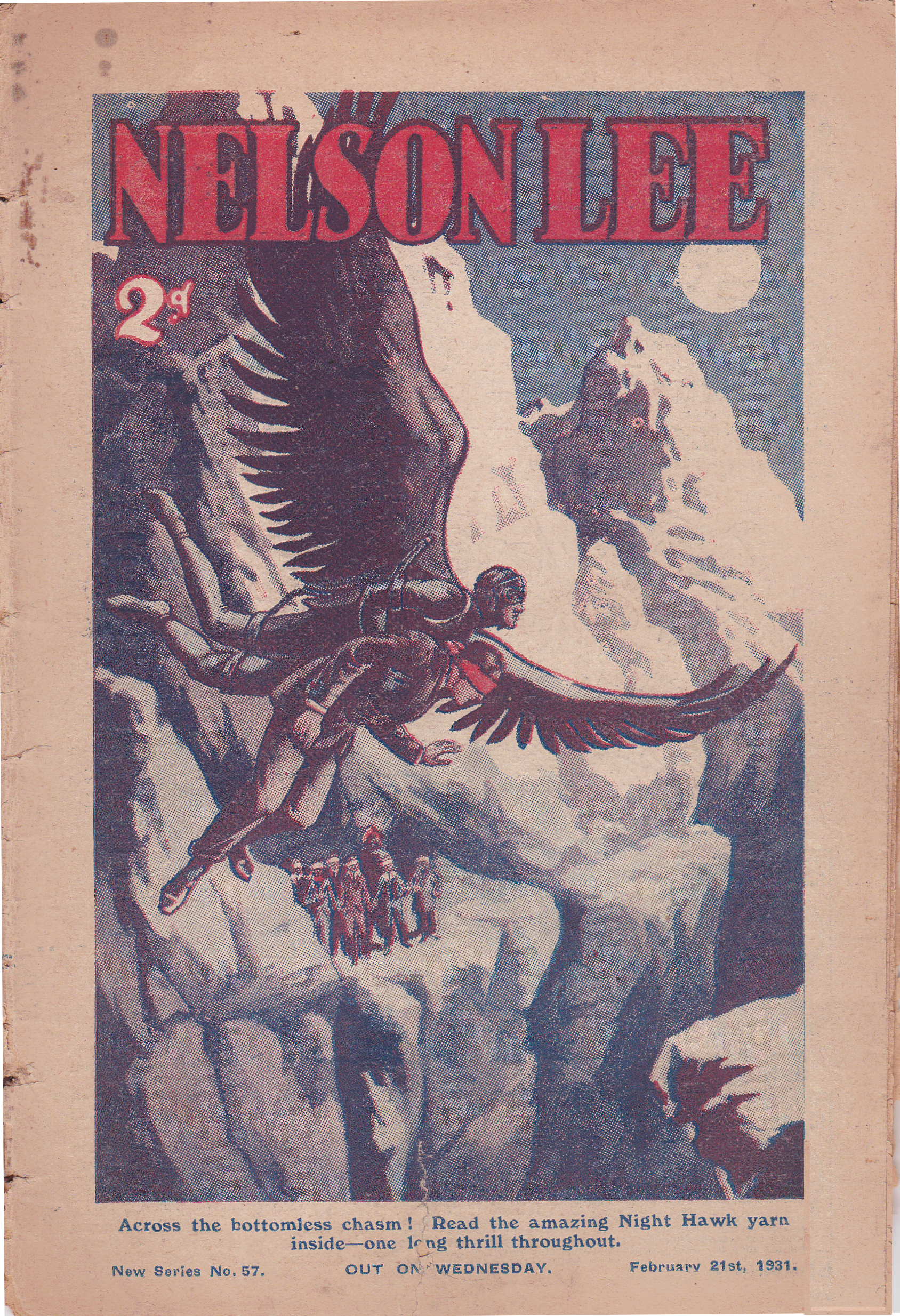
Night Hawk in Nelson Lee No. 57, February 21, 1931

Teed following on the success of his Sexton Blake creation Yvonne Cartier, gave Nelson Lee his first female foe: The Black Wolf, a cross-dressing martial arts aristocrat. She would match wits with Lee and Nipper in various locations around the world.

Not to be outdone, Brooks introduced Eileen Dare the female detective in Nelson Lee's Lady Assistant (1916). She appeared with Lee in 14 adventures.

Brooks was instrumental in launching the second phase of Lee's career. In "Nipper at St. Frank's" (Nelson Lee Library #112, 28 July 1917,) Lee and Nipper while fleeing from a Chinese Triad hide out at St. Frank's, a "venerable public school" in the Bellton area of Sussex. When the case at last was solved, Lee joined the faculty as headmaster and Nipper enrolled as a student. The two remained there for the next sixteen years solving mysteries and having adventures around the world, often with friends and Nipper's classmates.

John James Brearley Garbutt introduced Night Hawk, a superhero that began appearing as a backup feature in The Nelson Lee Library (New Series) No. 11, April 5, 1930 in a self-titled story. The hero was rich scientist Thurston Kyle who built an armored, winged flying suit to fight crime. He is considered one of the earliest examples of a flying armored superhero.

=== Howard Baker Collections ===
- The Barring-Out at St. Frank's! by Edwy Searles Brooks
- Expelled Incorporating The Secret Societies of St. Frank's & The 'Death' of Walter Church by Edwy Searles Brooks
- The Haunted School Incorporating the entire Ezra Quirke series by Edwy Searles Brooks

=== New Collections ===
- Nelson Lee: The Black Wolf Files (2020) by George Hamilton Teed
