= Pluck (story paper) =

British boys' story paper

- Categories: Story paper
- Frequency: Weekly
- First issue: 1894; 132 years ago
- Final issue: 1916
- Company: Amalgamated Press
- Country: United Kingdom
- Based in: London
- Language: English

Pluck was a British boys' story paper published by the Amalgamated Press in the late 19th and early 20th century. Although it never reached the same level of popularity as the Halfpenny Marvel or the Union Jack, it holds historical significance for introducing the fictional school of St. Jim's, the setting for the famous "Tom Merry" stories. Its halfpenny series ran for 518 issues from 24 November 1894 to 29 October 1904. Its penny edition ran for 594 issues from 5 November 1904 to 18 March 1916.

== Origins and format ==
Pluck was launched as Stories of Pluck, focusing on tales of bravery involving soldiers, sailors, firemen, and policemen. It initially featured a 16-page format with three-column text, a yellow cover, and red ink printing. Over time, the title was shortened to Pluck, and the content expanded to include a wider range of adventure and school stories. After approximately two years, the red cover printing was replaced with black or bronze blue.

== Notable authors and illustrators ==
Many prominent authors of boys' fiction contributed to Pluck, including Henry St. John, John G. Rowe, Paul Herring, S. Clarke Hook, and Alec G. Pearson. The publication also featured illustrations by notable artists such as Harry Lane, Val Reading, T.W. Holmes, Fred Barrett, R.J. Macdonald, and Leonard Shields.

== Detective stories and serials ==
For a few years Pluck featured tales by Maxwell Scott starring popular detective Nelson Lee. These include:

- "Saved from Siberia" (No. 118)
- "The Missing Admiral" (No. 137)
- "A Christmas Mystery" (No. 158, Double Number, 1897)
- "Captain Twilight" (No. 186)

and others.

The paper also reprinted serials from The Boys' Friend, including "Clive Hardacre’s Schooldays", "Val the Boy Acrobat," and "Silver Blaze."

Among its most enduring creations was "Jack Blake of St. Jim’s", first appearing in issue No. 106 (10 November 1906). This story marked the debut of the famous fictional school St. Jim’s, which later found greater success in The Gem.

== Shifts in content and style ==
Following in the footsteps of the Halfpenny Marvel and the Union Jack, Pluck transitioned into a penny paper on 5 November 1904. It experimented with different formats, initially featuring three complete stories in addition to a serialized narrative. Over time, this structure evolved, with detective stories and school tales gaining prominence.

Popular recurring characters and series in Pluck included:

- The Five Comrades (by S. Clarke Hook)
- The Captain, the Cook, and the Engineer (written under the pseudonym Harry Belbin, but actually by H.J. Garrish)
- Specs & Co. at Lyncroft (by H. Clarke Hook)
- Jack North’s Wycliffe stories (by J.N. Pentelow)
- Will Spearing, Scotland Yard Detective
- Charlie Chaplin
- George Marsden Plummer, former Scotland Yard Detective turned master criminal
- Dr. Huxton Rymer (by George Hamilton Teed)
- Circus stories by Charles Hamilton (as Harry Dorrian)

The "Cookey Scrubbs" stories by H.J. Garrish, illustrated by Arthur Clarke, were particularly praised for their humour and adventure.

== Decline and legacy ==
Despite running for over 20 years, Pluck struggled to maintain the same level of success as its counterparts. While the Union Jack cemented its legacy with the enduring popularity of Sexton Blake and Marvel maintained a long run with its recurring characters, Pluck frequently changed its content strategy.

By the middle of the First World War, Pluck had ceased publication, unable to compete with more stable and successful weeklies. Nevertheless, its contribution to British boys’ literature—particularly as the birthplace of St. Jim’s—ensures its place in literary history.
