= Nelson Lee (detective) =

Fictional detective in numerous boys' story papers

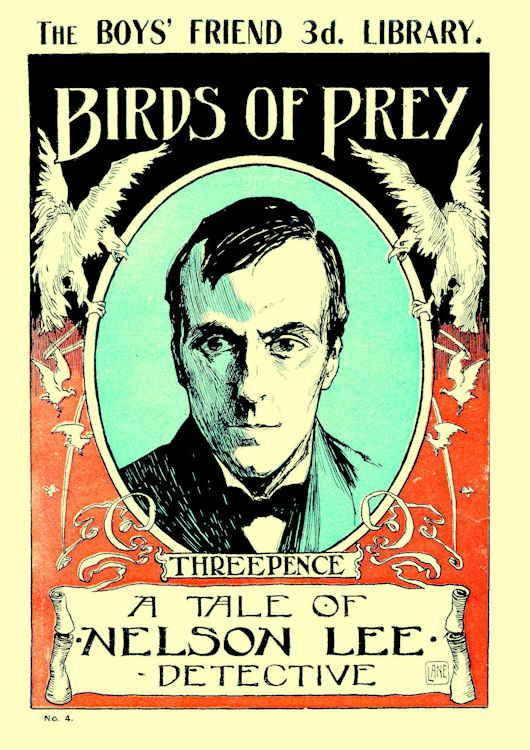
- First appearance: A Dead Man’s Secret (19 September 1894)
- Created by: Dr. John William Staniforth (as Maxwell Scott)

In-universe information
- Gender: Male
- Occupation: Detective
- Nationality: British

Nelson Lee is a fictional detective who featured in the Amalgamated Press papers over a 40-year run. Created in 1894 by Maxwell Scott (the pseudonym of Dr. John Staniforth 1863–1927) he appeared in various publications including The Halfpenny Marvel, Pluck, The Boys' Friend, Boys' Realm, The Boys' Herald and the Union Jack In 1915 he was given his own story-paper series, The Nelson Lee Library, which ran until 1933.

In all Lee appeared in over 2500 tales set in every corner of the globe, making him one of the most published fictional detectives of all time.

== Publication history ==
=== The 1890s: The solo years ===
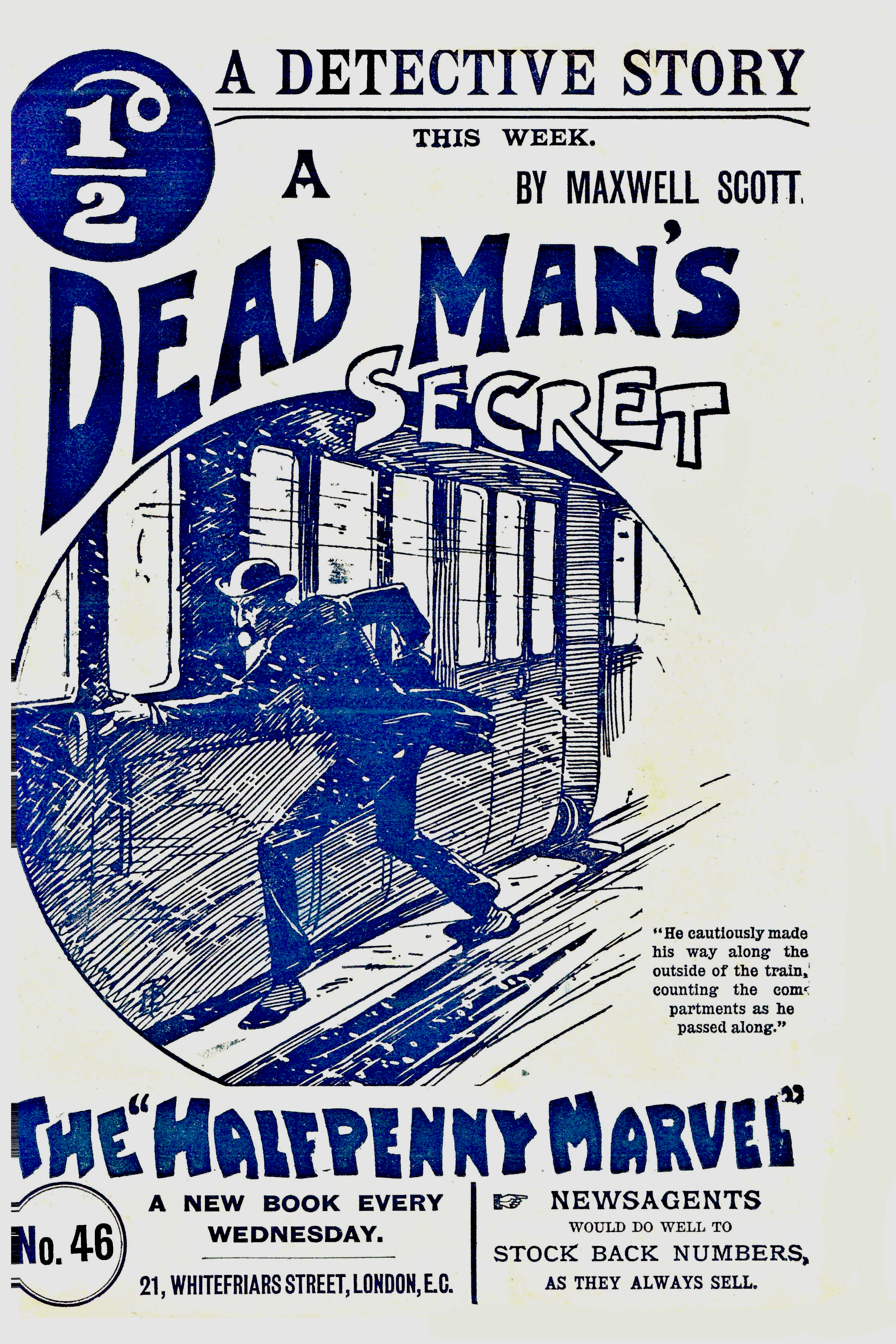
Nelson Lee's Debut: A Dead Man's Secret

Nelson Lee made his debut in A Dead Man’s Secret in The Halfpenny Marvel #46, on 19 September 1894. The world would meet him at the open of Chapter 2:

Nelson Lee, the famous detective, sat in his room in Gray's Inn Road, dealing with his morning's correspondence. So great was the demand for his advice and help that nine-tenths of his replies were to the effect that "Mr. Lee regrets that, owing to the number of cases he already has on hand, he is unable to deal with Mr. So-and-so’s case." He had already replied in this strain to an earl whose family jewels had been stolen, a banker whose clerk had absconded, and a well-known member of the Jockey Club whose favourite race-horse had been poisoned, when he was interrupted by the entrance of his landlady, who handed him a card...

The Jewel Thief

Lee was an immediate success and made his second appearance in Nelson Lee, Detective six issues later. He made his third appearance in The Adventures of Nelson Lee, in Union Jack Library #35, in December 1894 then made a final appearance in The Halfpenny Marvel in The Jewel Thief in issue #74. From May 1895 he began appearing in Pluck featuring in 18 tales over the next three years. That summer he also appeared in The Mystery of the Malton Moors published in the Comic Home Journal. In the 1895 Christmas issue of Pluck he starred alongside Harry Blyth's detectives Sexton Blake and Gideon Barr. The tale, Christmas Clues, established Lee and Blake as friends. The two would team up repeatedly over the next 40 years. During this period Lee worked alone for the most part, accepting cases from his office on Gray's Inn Road. Tales from this era include:

Nelson Lee's Solo Adventures
Title	Story Paper	Date
A Dead Man's Secret	The Halfpenny Marvel #46	19 September 1894.
Nelson Lee Detective	The Halfpenny Marvel #52	30 October 1894
The Adventures of Nelson Lee; Includes 4 tales: A Christmas Conspiracy; The Headless Robin; The Professor's Gold the Hermit of the Rigi	The Union Jack #35	Christmas Issue, 20 December 1894
The Jewel Thief	The Halfpenny Marvel #74	2 April 1895
A False Scent	Pluck #24	4 May 1895
The Thief of the Black Ruby	Pluck #52	16 November 1895
The Mystery of the Malton Moors	Comic Home Journal	1895
Christmas Clues	Pluck #56	7 December 1895
Nelson Lee Detective	Pluck #71	27 March 1896
A Threefold Mystery	Pluck #108	12 December 1896
No Clue	Pluck #110	26 December 1896
Vengeance	Pluck #114	22 January 1897
Saved from Siberia	Pluck # 118	19 February 1897
The Missing Admiral	Pluck #137	2 July 1897
The Mystery of the old Churchyard	Pluck #142	6 August 1897
A Christmas Mystery	Pluck #158	26 November 1897
The Black Brotherhood	Pluck #160	10 December 1897
The Theft of the Aztec Opal	Pluck #161	17 December 1897
Sons of Fire	Pluck #174	18 March 1898
One False Step	Pluck #178	15 April 1898
Captain Twilight	Pluck #186	10 June 1898
The Way of Transgressors	Pluck #204	14 October 1898
A Triple Tragedy	Pluck #204	25 November 1898
The Stolen Despatches	Pluck #210	9 December 1898
A Christmas Tragedy	The Boys' Friend #308	22 December 1900
The Fatal Fingerprints	The Boys' Friend #319	February 1901

=== The 1900s: The Great Serials ===
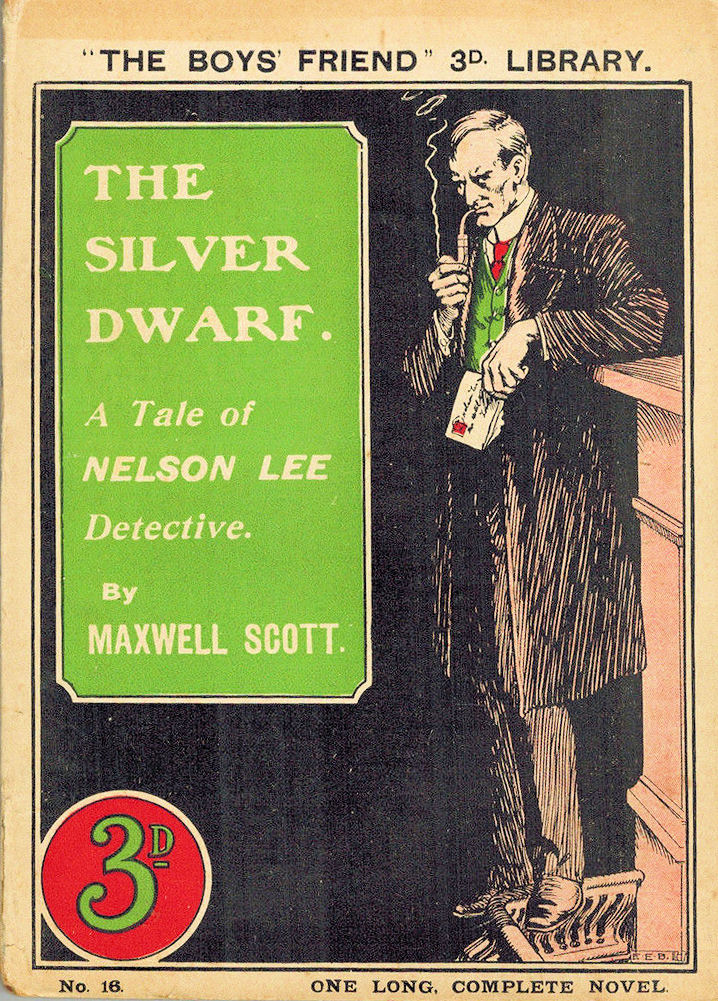
The Silver Dwarf

Towards the end of the 19th century Staniforth had a falling out with his editor and switched to publishing in other story papers. The era of the great Nelson Lee serials began with Birds of Prey a 20-part serial that ran in The Boys' Friend from 27 July – 7 December 1901. It was followed by The Silver Dwarf (7 Dec 1901 to 15 March 1902) and The Missing Heir (29 March – 9 August 1902). Staniforth listed these as his favourite Nelson Lee tales.

Some of the popular Nelson Lee serials from this era include:

Nelson Lee Serials
Title	Story Paper	Date
Birds of Prey	Boys' Friend #1-26, 1901	1901
The Silver Dwarf	Boys' Friend #26-41	1901–1902
The Missing Heir	Boys' Friend #42-61	1902
Nelson Lee's Rival	Boys' Realm #26-52	1902–1903
The Hidden Will	Boys' Realm #64-84	1903–1904
Nelson Lee's Pupil	Boys' Herald #2-26	1903–1904
The Great Unknown	Boys' Friend #157-189	1904–1905
Nipper's Schooldays	Boys' Herald #73-97	1904–1905
The Football Detective	Boys' Herald #118-138	1905–1906
The Black House	Boys' Friend #221-236	1905
Detective-Warder Nelson Lee	Boys' Friend #237-257	1905–1906
The Soldier Detective	The Jester and Wonder #233-253	1906
The Captain of St. Ninian's	Boys' Friend #257-276	1906
The Iron Hand	The Boys' Herald #207-232	1907
The Fighting Fifth	Boys' Realm #253-	1907
Britain Beyond the Seas	Boys' Friend #353-387	1908
Detective Nipper	Boys' Realm #488-502	1910–11
The New Bowler	Boys' Realm #360-370	1909
Bowled Out	Boys' Realm #371-383	1909
The Winged Terror	The Boys' Herald #329-349	1909–1910
The Golden Quest	Boys' Friend #459-475	1910
Long Live the King	Boys' Friend #479-528	1911
Nipper at St. Ninian's	Boys' Friend #685-698	1912
Nipper's First Case	Boys Herald 511; Cheer Boys Cheer 1	1912
The Film Detective	Boys' Friend #265-698	1914
On His Majesty's Service or The Master Spy	Boys' Friend #698-712	1914–1915

=== The boy-detective: The creation of a new sub-genre ===
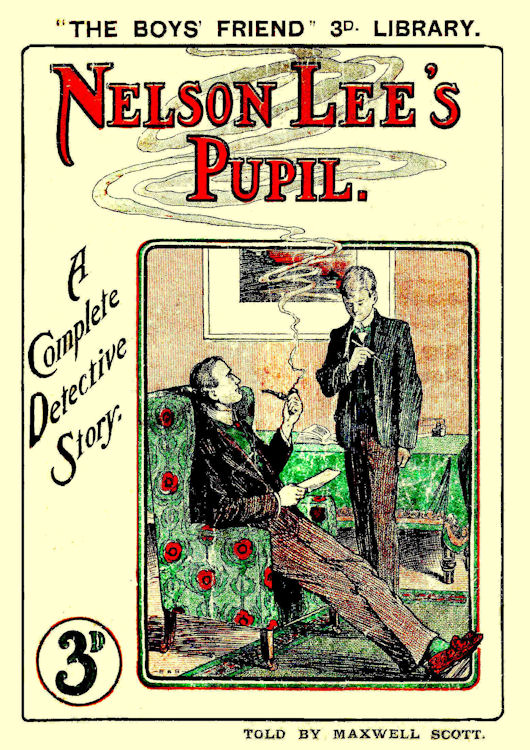
Nelson Lee's Pupil

In 1903 Nelson Lee's life changed forever. In Nelson Lee's Pupil he acquired an assistant: Richard Hamilton, better known as "Nipper". Nipper was a street urchin who made his first appearance in A Dead Man’s Secret ten years earlier. This retelling of their encounter ran from issues #2-26 in Boys' Herald and was subsequently republished in The Boys' Friend Library in 1907. The two would be inseparable for the next 30 years.

Following in Lee's footsteps, Sexton Blake was given a boy assistant, Tinker, the following year, in Cunning against Skill, a tale penned by William Murray Graydon in 1904. Tinker and Nipper were influential in the subsequent creation of boy-detectives in the British story papers with subsequent authors following the pattern that they established: "uncultured but extraordinarily sharp street urchins, rescued from poverty and obscurity by a famous London private detective."

A few of Nipper's more prominent cases include:

Nipper's Cases
Title	Story Paper	Date
Nelson Lee's Pupil	Boys' Herald #2-26	1903–1904
Nipper's Schooldays	Boys' Herald #73-97	1904–1905
The Captain of St. Ninian's	Boys' Friend #257-276	1906
Detective Nipper	Boys' Realm #488-502	1910–11
Nipper at St. Ninian's	Boys' Friend #685-698	1912
Nipper's First Case	Boys Herald 511; Cheer Boys Cheer 1	1912

=== The Boys' Friend Library ===
Many of Scott's Nelson Lee serials were abridged and republished as complete tales in the Boys' Friend Friend Library.

Written by Maxwell Scott

Nelson Lee Adventures
Title	Story Paper	Date
Birds of Prey	The Boys' Friend Library #4	October, 1906
The Silver Dwarf	The Boys' Friend Library #16	April, 1907
The Missing Heir	The Boys' Friend Library #17	May, 1907
Nelson Lee's Pupil	The Boys' Friend Library #19	June, 1907
The Great Unknown	The Boys' Friend Library #24	August, 1907
The Stolen Submarine	The Boys' Friend Library #25	September, 1907
Nelson Lee's Rival	The Boys' Friend Library #34	December, 1907
The Football Detective	The Boys' Friend Library #62	September, 1908
A Slip of the Pen	The Boys' Friend Library #107	January, 1910
The Hidden Will	The Boys' Friend Library #138	November, 1910
The Black House	The Boys' Friend Library #209	November, 1912
Nelson Lee in the Navy	The Boys' Friend Library #282	November, 1914
The Film Detective	The Boys' Friend Library #298	May, 1915
On His Majesty's Service	The Boys' Friend Library #301	June, 1915
Out To Win	The Boys' Friend Library #437	November, 1918
Detective-Warder Nelson Lee	The Boys' Friend Library #530	November, 1920

Written by Edwy Searles Brooks

Nelson Lee Tales
Title	Story Paper	Date
The Green Triangle	The Boys' Friend Library #649	January, 1923
The Return of Zingrave	The Boys' Friend Library #656	February, 1923
The Wonder Craft	The Boys' Friend Library #657	March, 1923

=== The Nelson Lee Library: 1915–1933 ===
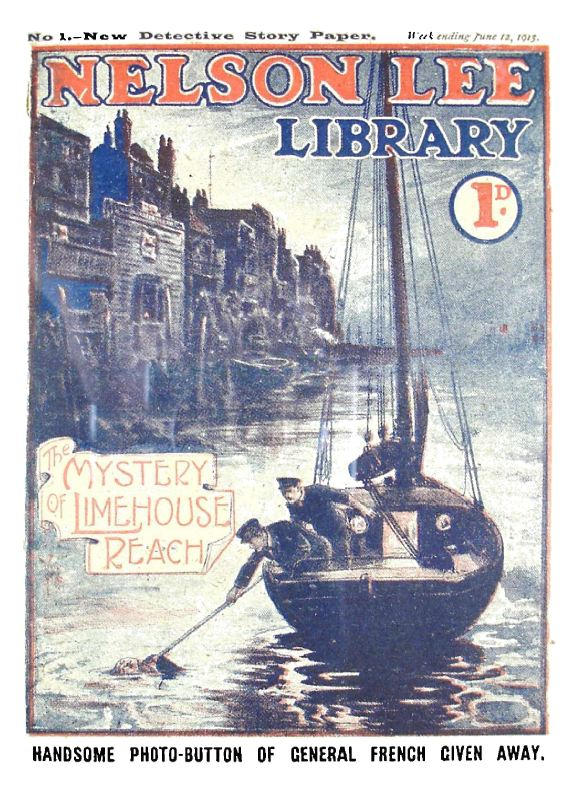
Nelson Lee Library #1

Lee featured in his own long-running magazine, The Nelson Lee Library, from 1915 to 1933 which was published in four "series". The first issue of The Nelson Lee Library was published on 12 June 1915, entitled "The Mystery of Limehouse Reach" and written by Sexton Blake writer A. C. Murray. Many other popular Blake writers would pen Lee tales including William Murray Graydon, William J. Bayfield, George Hamilton Teed, Norman Goddard, and Edwy Searles Brooks.

Series 1 ran from 12 June 1915 until 24 April 1926, a total of 568 issues.

Series 2 ran from 1 May 1926 until 18 January 1930, a total of 194 issues.

Series 3 ran from 25 January 1930 until 18 February 1933, a total of 161 issues.

Series 4 ran from 25 February 1933 until 12 August 1933. The Nelson Lee Library then merged with the Gem.

A few issues of note: Maxwell Scott wrote just four adventures for the paper that bore his greatest creation's name, A Miscarriage of Justice (1915), The Convict's Dilemma (1915), In Borrowed Plumes (1915), and When Rogues Fall Out (1916). The Spendthrift was George Hamilton Teed's first Nelson Lee tale. It was followed by Twenty Fathoms Deep Edwy Searles Brooks debut Lee tale. Teed following on the wild success of his Sexton Blake creation Yvonne Cartier, gave Nelson Lee his first female foe: The Black Wolf, a cross-dressing martial arts aristocrat. She would match wits with Lee and Nipper in various locations around the world. Not to be outdone, Brooks introduced Eileen Dare the female detective in Nelson Lee's Lady Assistant (1916). She appeared with Lee in 14 adventures. Brooks was instrumental in launching the second phase of Lee's career. In "Nipper at St. Frank's," (Nelson Lee Library #112, 28 July 1917,) Lee and Nipper while fleeing from a Chinese Triad hide out at St. Frank's, a "venerable public school" in the Bellton area of Sussex. When the case at last was solved, Lee joined the faculty as headmaster and Nipper enrolled as a student. The two remained there for the next sixteen years solving mysteries and having adventures around the world, often with friends and Nipper's classmates.

Series 1: The Pre-St. Frank's Cases

Each issue contained a complete detective story.

Nelson Lee Adventures
Nelson Lee Issue	Title	Author
Nelson Lee Library #1	The Mystery of Limehouse Reach	A. C. Murray
Nelson Lee Library #2	The Case of the Secret Room	Mark Darren
Nelson Lee Library #3	The Clue of the Straw Sailor's Hat	William Murray Graydon
Nelson Lee Library #4	The Case of the Interned Detective	A.C. Murray
Nelson Lee Library #5	The Great Submarine Mystery	Unknown
Nelson Lee Library #6	Stolen Property	Unknown
Nelson Lee Library #7	A Miscarriage of Justice	Maxwell Scott
Nelson Lee Library #8	The Convict's Dilemma	Maxwell Scott
Nelson Lee Library #9	Nelson Lee - Cracksman	William Murray Graydon
Nelson Lee Library #10	Shadowed by Two	Mark Darren
Nelson Lee Library #11	The War Factory Mystery	Unknown
Nelson Lee Library #12	British to the Backbone	Unknown
Nelson Lee Library #13	In Borrowed Plumes	Maxwell Scott
Nelson Lee Library #14	The King's Bad Bargain	Unknown
Nelson Lee Library #15	The Spendthrift	George Hamilton Teed
Nelson Lee Library #16	Twenty Fathoms Deep	Edwy Searles Brooks
Nelson Lee Library #17	The Black Wolf	George Hamilton Teed
Nelson Lee Library #18	The Case of the Duplicate Key	George Hamilton Teed
Nelson Lee Library #19	The Secret of the Swamp	George Hamilton Teed
Nelson Lee Library #20	Not Guilty	A. C. Murray
Nelson Lee Library #21	The Terror of Troone Towers	Edwy Searles Brooks
Nelson Lee Library #22	Edges of Steel	George Hamilton Teed
Nelson Lee Library #23	The League of the Green Triangle	Edwy Searles Brooks
Nelson Lee Library #24	The Case of the Tube of Radium	George Hamilton Teed
Nelson Lee Library #25	The Specialist's Last Case	Edwy Searles Brooks
Nelson Lee Library #26	The Crystal Urn	George Hamilton Teed
Nelson Lee Library #27	The Gold Cavern	Edwy Searles Brooks
Nelson Lee Library #28	The Forged Fingerprints	Edwy Searles Brooks
Nelson Lee Library #29	The Three Millionaires	Edwy Searles Brooks
Nelson Lee Library #30	A Mystery of Venice	George Hamilton Teed
Nelson Lee Library #31	The Frozen Man	George Hamilton Teed
Nelson Lee Library #32	The Prison Breakers	Edwy Searles Brooks
Nelson Lee Library #33	Amazement Island	Edwy Searles Brooks
Nelson Lee Library #34	Robbery Wholesale	George Hamilton Teed
Nelson Lee Library #35	The Mummy Mystery	Edwy Searles Brooks
Nelson Lee Library #36	The Mystery Man Of Lhassa	George Hamilton Teed
Nelson Lee Library #37	The House of Fear	Edwy Searles Brooks
Nelson Lee Library #38	The President's Peril	Edwy Searles Brooks
Nelson Lee Library #39	The Lightning Clue (Jim the Penman)	Edwy Searles Brooks
Nelson Lee Library #40	The Red Menace	George Hamilton Teed
Nelson Lee Library #41	The Buried Invention	Edwy Searles Brooks
Nelson Lee Library #42	The Great Will Forgery	Edwy Searles Brooks
Nelson Lee Library #43	The Robbery at Ponder's Bank	George Hamilton Teed
Nelson Lee Library #44	The 'Doctored' Racehorse	Edwy Searles Brooks
Nelson Lee Library #45	The Forged Marriage Lines	Edwy Searles Brooks
Nelson Lee Library #46	The Last of the Genghis	George Hamilton Teed
Nelson Lee Library #47	The Ship of Doom	Edwy Searles Brooks
Nelson Lee Library #48	When Rogues Fall Out	Maxwell Scott
Nelson Lee Library #49	The Forged War Orders	Edwy Searles Brooks
Nelson Lee Library #50	The Great Club Raid	Edwy Searles Brooks
Nelson Lee Library #51	The Mystery of the Moor	Edwy Searles Brooks
Nelson Lee Library #52	At Half Tide	George Hamilton Teed
Nelson Lee Library #53	Zingrave's Last Card	Edwy Searles Brooks
Nelson Lee Library #54	The Mystery of the Mail Van	Edwy Searles Brooks
Nelson Lee Library #55	The Man with Four Identities	George Hamilton Teed
Nelson Lee Library #56	The Case of the Fatal Flight	A. S. Hardy
Nelson Lee Library #57	Nelson Lee's Lady Assistant	Edwy Searles Brooks
Nelson Lee Library #58	The Crimson Disc	George Hamilton Teed
Nelson Lee Library #59	The Ribbon of Light	Edwy Searles Brooks
Nelson Lee Library #60	The Mystery of the Turret	Edwy Searles Brooks
Nelson Lee Library #61	The Golden Boomerang	George Hamilton Teed
Nelson Lee Library #62	The Amazing Case of the Lost Explorer	Edwy Searles Brooks
Nelson Lee Library #63	The Spectre of Scarcroft	Edwy Searles Brooks
Nelson Lee Library #64	The Plague Ship	Edwy Searles Brooks
Nelson Lee Library #65	Against The Law	Edwy Searles Brooks
Nelson Lee Library #66	The Mystery of the 10.20 Express	Edwy Searles Brooks
Nelson Lee Library #67	The Crook	George Hamilton Teed
Nelson Lee Library #68	The Great Insurance Swindle	Edwy Searles Brooks
Nelson Lee Library #69	The Mystery of Barron Hall	George Hamilton Teed
Nelson Lee Library #70	The House in the Hollow	Edwy Searles Brooks
Nelson Lee Library #71	The Clue of the Raincoat	George Hamilton Teed
Nelson Lee Library #72	The Secret of the Martello Tower	Edwy Searles Brooks
Nelson Lee Library #73	Blue Diamonds	George Hamilton Teed
Nelson Lee Library #74	The Caves of Silence	Edwy Searles Brooks
Nelson Lee Library #75	The Night Before the Trial	Edwy Searles Brooks
Nelson Lee Library #76	The Affair of the Nabob's Jewels	Edwy Searles Brooks
Nelson Lee Library #77	The House of Hazard	Edwy Searles Brooks
Nelson Lee Library #78	A Christmas of Peril	Edwy Searles Brooks
Nelson Lee Library #79	The Mystery of the Closed Door	George Hamilton Teed
Nelson Lee Library #80	A Mid-Atlantic Mystery	Edwy Searles Brooks
Nelson Lee Library #81	The Plantation Mystery	George Hamilton Teed
Nelson Lee Library #82	Harlo the Hypnotist	Edwy Searles Brooks
Nelson Lee Library #83	The Broken Vase	George Hamilton Teed
Nelson Lee Library #84	Tracked to the Trenches	Edwy Searles Brooks
Nelson Lee Library #85	The Circle of Terror	Edwy Searles Brooks
Nelson Lee Library #86	The Great Air Mystery	George Hamilton Teed
Nelson Lee Library #87	Millions at Stake	Edwy Searles Brooks
Nelson Lee Library #88	The Yellow Mask	Edwy Searles Brooks
Nelson Lee Library #89	A Stubborn Case	George Hamilton Teed
Nelson Lee Library #90	Monn the Miser	Edwy Searles Brooks
Nelson Lee Library #91	The Mystery of the Footlights	Edwy Searles Brooks
Nelson Lee Library #92	The Man Hunters	George Hamilton Teed
Nelson Lee Library #93	The Brass-Bound Box	Edwy Searles Brooks
Nelson Lee Library #94	The Monk of Montressor	Edwy Searles Brooks
Nelson Lee Library #95	The Secret of Crooked Reef	Edwy Searles Brooks
Nelson Lee Library #96	Nipper's Note Book	Edwy Searles Brooks
Nelson Lee Library #97	The Manor House Mystery	Edwy Searles Brooks
Nelson Lee Library #98	Fangs of Steel	Edwy Searles Brooks
Nelson Lee Library #99	The Mystery of the Grey Car	Edwy Searles Brooks
Nelson Lee Library #100	The Clue of the Twisted Ring	Edwy Searles Brooks
Nelson Lee Library #101	Behind the Door	Edwy Searles Brooks
Nelson Lee Library #102	The Secret of Melsey Island	Edwy Searles Brooks
Nelson Lee Library #103	The Sheriff of Blazing Gulch	Edwy Searles Brooks
Nelson Lee Library #104	The Hovering Peril	Edwy Searles Brooks
Nelson Lee Library #105	The Ivory Seekers	Edwy Searles Brooks
Nelson Lee Library #106	Cast on the Shore	Edwy Searles Brooks
Nelson Lee Library #107	Loot	George Hamilton Teed
Nelson Lee Library #108	The Kidnapped Stockbroker	George Hamilton Teed
Nelson Lee Library #109	The Case of the Crimson Feathers	Unknown
Nelson Lee Library #110	The Affair of the Duplicate Door	Edwy Searles Brooks
Nelson Lee Library #111	The Yellow Shadow	Edwy Searles Brooks

Other Nelson Lee tales in the Nelson Lee Library

Nelson Lee Adventures
Nelson Lee Issue	Title	
Nelson Lee Library #370	The Ivory Hand	Anon
Nelson Lee Library #371	On the Ninth Green	Anon
Nelson Lee Library #372	The Tyneside Mystery	Anon
Nelson Lee Library #373	The 11:15 pm to South Shields	Anon
Nelson Lee Library #374	The Bank Car Puzzle	Anon
Nelson Lee Library #375	House of the Clanging Bells, or The Case of the White Lead Substitute	Anon
Nelson Lee Library #376	Case of the Racing Tipster	Anon
Nelson Lee Library #377	The Hollow Club, or Clue of the Gloved Hand	Anon
Nelson Lee Library #378	The Missing Valet	Anon
Nelson Lee Library #379-80	The Strange Case of the Thurlingham Hall Robbery	Anthony Skene; Features Zenith the Albino
Nelson Lee Library #381	The Case of the Wooden-Legged Sailorman	
Nelson Lee Library #382	The Stencil Clue	Anon
Nelson Lee Library #383	The Kidnapped Goalie	Anon
Nelson Lee Library #384-5	The Mayfair Mystery	Anon
Nelson Lee Library #386-7	The Strange Affair at Heather Hall	Anon
Nelson Lee Library #388	The Case of the Cardiff Contractor	Anon
Nelson Lee Library #389-90	The Flaming God	Anon
Nelson Lee Library #391	The Man with the Cut Lip	Anon
Nelson Lee Library #404-408	The Black Mask	Anon
Nelson Lee Library #410-19	The League of the Iron Hand	Maxwell Scott
Nelson Lee Library #420/431	The Silver Dwarf	Maxwell Scott
Nelson Lee Library #431-41	The Missing Heir	Maxwell Scott
Nelson Lee Library #442-45	Night Owl and the Alliance of 13	Anon
Nelson Lee Library #484-96	Green Triangle and Jim the Penman	Anon
Nelson Lee Library #497-502	The Hollowdene Manor Mystery	Edwy Searles Brooks; Features Eileen Dare
Nelson Lee Library #503-12	The Invisible Grip	Edwy Searles Brooks; Features Zingrave

=== The Union Jack: 1916-1920 ===
In all these tales, Nelson Lee and Nipper team up with Sexton Blake and Tinker.

Nelson Lee Adventures
Story Paper Issue	Title	Author	Date
The Union Jack #688	In Double Harness	Robert Murray Graydon	1916
The Union Jack #768	The Mount-Stonham Murder Mystery	Edwy Searles Brooks	1918
The Union Jack #771	The Mystic Cypher	Edwy Searles Brooks	1918
The Union Jack #774	The Dual Detectives	Edwy Searles Brooks	1918
The Union Jack #777	The Flashlight Clue	Edwy Searles Brooks	1918
The Union Jack #781	The Case of the American Soldier	Edwy Searles Brooks	1918
The Union Jack #784	The Crooks of Rapid Hollow	Edwy Searles Brooks	1918
The Union Jack #786	The Terror of Trevis World	Edwy Searles Brooks	1918
The Union Jack #788	The Studded Footprints	Edwy Searles Brooks	1918
The Union Jack #793	The Case of the Hollow Dagger	Edwy Searles Brooks	1918
The Union Jack #794	Waldo the Wonder-man	Edwy Searles Brooks	1918
The Union Jack #796	Hoodwinked or the Diamonds of Zamkala	Edwy Searles Brooks	1919
The Union Jack #796	The Clue of the Frozen Knife	Edwy Searles Brooks	1919
The Union Jack #801	The Shanghaied Detective	Edwy Searles Brooks	1919
The Union Jack #805	The Case of the Stacey Rubies	Edwy Searles Brooks	1919
The Union Jack #817	The Great Spiritualism Case	Edwy Searles Brooks	1919
The Union Jack #859	The Mystery of the Gnarled Oak	Edwy Searles Brooks	1920
The Union Jack #870	The Mystery of the 9:12 Express	Edwy Searles Brooks	1920

=== The Sexton Blake Library: 1915-1921 ===
A short story.

Nelson Lee Adventures
Story Paper	Title	Author	Date
The Sexton Blake Library #5	The Case of the Shrivelled Fingers	Unknown	1915

In these two tales, Nelson Lee and Nipper team up with Sexton Blake and Tinker.

Nelson Lee Adventures
Story Paper	Title	Author	Date
The Sexton Blake Library #80	The Bathchair Mystery	Andrew Murray	1919
The Sexton Blake Library #190	The Valley of Fear	Francis Addington Symonds	1921

=== The Pluck Library: 1916 ===
The editor introduced the Nelson Lee tale with this announcement: "Following on numerous requests from readers of The Nelson Lee Library for stories of Nelson Lee in other publications, I have pleasure in presenting this week, in Pluck, No. 1 of what I hope will prove the finest series of detective storties ever published featuring Nelson Lee.

Nelson Lee Adventures
Story Paper	Title	Author	Date
The Pluck Library #586	The Case of the German Financier	Unknown	22 January 1916

=== The Detective Library: 1919-1921 ===
The stories were predominantly written by Scott and Edwy Searles Brooks.

Nelson Lee Adventures
Story paper Issue	Title	Notes
The Detective Library #1	The Mystery of Torgreave Hall	1919 (reprinting of The Jewel Thief)
The Detective Library #2	The Case of the Kidnapped Engineer	1919
The Detective Library #3	The Mystery of the Moor	1919
The Detective Library #4	The Aztec Opal	1919
The Detective Library #5	The Vanishing Picture	1919
The Detective Library #6	The Jaguar's Master	1919
The Detective Library #7	The Clue of the Six Capsules	1919
The Detective Library #8	Sons of Fire	
The Detective Library #9	The Smoky Pillar	
The Detective Library #10	The Remarkable Case of the Babylonian Brick	
The Detective Library	The House with the Crooked Window	
The Detective Library	The Case of the Horned Frog	
The Detective Library	The Swinbury Poultry Killing Mystery	
The Detective Library	The Missing Solicitor of Bedford Row	
The Detective Library	The Bogus Butler of Harlech	
The Detective Library	The Case of Dr. Mau-Ling-Su	
The Detective Library	Jim the Penman series	
The Detective Library	Brotherhood of the Five Fingers	1920
The Detective Library	Nipper at St. Ninian's	1920

=== The Prairie Library: 1920 ===
The stories were written by George Hamilton Teed.

Nelson Lee Adventures
Story paper Issue	Title	Notes
The Prairie Library	The Black Pearl	Serial. January 1920
The Prairie Library #36-40	A Dangerous Partnership	Serial. 1919
The Prairie Library #51-55	The Missing Professor	Serial. 1920
The Prairie Library	The Inner Seven	Serial. 1920

=== The Nuggett Library: 1921 ===
These tales were predominantly written by Andrew Murray. Many of these feature Sexton Blake foes and may be rewrites of Blake tales.

Nelson Lee Adventures
Story paper Issue	Title	Notes
The Nugget Library #45	White Man's Secret	(featuring Kew & Carlac)
The Nugget Library #46	Man in the Copper Casket	(featuring John Lawless )
The Nugget Library #47	The Bridge Builders	(featuring Trouble Nantucket)
The Nugget Library #48	The Sign of the Red Claw	(featuring Chulda Ghan)
The Nugget Library #49	The Amazing Schoolboy	(featuring Timothy Tudmr)
The Nugget Library #50	Case of The Two Impostors and Nipper's Wager	(featuring Kew & Carlac)
The Nugget Library #51	The Outsiders	(featuring Langley Mostyn)
The Nugget Library #52	Rogues of the River	(featuring Thames Police)
The Nugget Library #53	Expelled from St. Frank's	(featuring Watson & Harrington)
The Nugget Library #54	The Sign of the Shepherd's Crook	
The Nugget Library #56	Meshes of Mystery	
The Nugget Library #58	The Case of the Heavyweight Champion	(featuring John Lawless)
The Nugget Library #62	Lost - A Football Team	(featuring Lawless)
The Nugget Library #66	The Case of the Arab Footballer	(featuring John Lawless).
The Nugget Library #68	Nelson Lee in India, or The Rajah's Secret	
The Nugget Library #70	The Treasury Notes Mystery	

== Lee's associates ==
Aside from Nipper, there have ben numerous supporting played in the Lee canon. In the early years of his career Lee worked intermittently with the French detective Jean Moreau. Later in the first years of the Nelson Lee Library he worked with 'girl detective' Eileen Dare. He had a bloodhound named Rajah, and later another named Wolf.

Lord Dorrimore or Dorrie, a somewhat eccentric millionaire, was one of the most popular characters to appear in the Nelson Lee Library. He often travelled with Umlosi, a mighty African warrior. The two made their first appearance in The Ivory Seekers and reappeared throughout Lee's tenure at St. Franks.

Lee collaborated with Sexton Blake on a number of occasions. The two worked together on The Winged Terror, penned by Maxwell Scott, a tale that ran in issues #329-336 of Boys' Herald in 1909. Later other authors paired the two in the pages of the Union Jack. In Double Harness, (Union Jack #683) written by Robert Murray Graydon saw the two working against each other to solve a case, while Waldo the Wonder Man, (Union Jack #794,) saw them team up to capture one of Blake's most beloved foes.

== Lee's enemies ==
Nelson Lee had a fine rogues gallery of supervillains. Some of the most famous included:

Jim the Penman (created by Edwy Searles Brooks), was the nickname of Douglas James Sutcliffe, a solicitor turned forger and a master of disguise. One never knew where he was going to turn up next and his skill with the pen was only equalled by his skill at disguise, his audacity and brilliant sang froid, his coolness in emergency and his never-ceasing efforts to pull off some spectacular coup.

Professor Cyrus Zingrave (created by Edwy Searles Brooks), the Monster of Moat Hollow, a Napoleon of Crime.

The Black Wolf (created by George Hamilton Teed) Lee's greatest female opponent.

Dr. Mortimer Crane (created by George Hamilton Teed) a brain and nerve specialist whose talents had been diverted to wrongdoing. He was a master of disguise and one of Lee's most sinister and cunning opponents.

He fought criminal organisations like the League of the Green Triangle, the Circle of Terror and the Fu Chang Tong and also matched wits against legendary Sexton Blake foes Zenith the Albino (created by Anthony Skene), Dr. Huxton Rymer (created by George Hamilton Teed), and deadly duo Count Ivor Carlac and Professor Francis Kew created by Andrew Murray.

=== Howard Baker collections ===
- The Barring-Out at St. Frank's! by Edwy Searles Brooks
- Expelled Incorporating The Secret Societies of St. Frank's & The 'Death' of Walter Church by Edwy Searles Brooks
- The Haunted School Incorporating the entire Ezra Quirke series by Edwy Searles Brooks

=== New collections ===
- Sexton Blake: The Early Years (2020) features the first 5 Nelson Lee cases by Maxwell Scott, includes Christmas Clues the first Nelson Lee/Sexton Blake co-appearance.
- Sexton Blake: Friends and Allies (2020) features In Double Harness by Robert Murray Graydon
- Sexton Blake & Nelson Lee (2021) by Edwy Searles Brooks
- Sexton Blake: The Claire Delisle Files (2022) features The Valley of Fear by Francis Addington Symonds
- Nelson Lee: The Black Wolf Files (2020) by George Hamilton Teed
- Nelson Lee: The Scott Files (2021) by Maxwell Scott. Includes Birds of Prey, The Silver Dwarf, and The Missing Heir.
