= George Hamilton Teed =

Canadian author

- Born: 9 December 1886; Woodstock, New Brunswick, Canada
- Died: 24 December 1938 (aged 52); London, England
- Occupation: Writer
- Writing career
- Pen name: G.H. Teed, Hamilton Teed, Peter Kingsland, Desmond Reid
- Period: 1910 – 1938
- Genre: Adventure fiction

George Hamilton Teed (9 December 1886 – 24 December 1938) was a Canadian author who also wrote under the pen-names G. H. Teed, Hamilton Teed, Louis Brittany, Peter Kingsland, and Desmond Reid. Teed was born in Woodstock, New Brunswick. He specialized in adventure fiction and detective stories, but also wrote science fiction and the odd romance. He is best remembered for his tales of Sexton Blake, a popular, fictional British detective who featured in a wide variety of publications in the first half of the twentieth century. He wrote close to three hundred Blake tales, more than any other author, and his creations and writings are considered "the best in Blake history before the Second World War."

== Life and work ==
George Heber Hamilton Teed was one of three children. His father, Almon Isiah Teed, was a merchant who owned saw-mills, a fleet of boats, and a coffee plantation in South America. Hamilton was educated at McGill University in Montreal at that time one of Canada's most exclusive schools. After graduation he set off to explore the world. He circumnavigated the globe twice, and tried his hand at various jobs including overseeing a banana plantation in Costa Rica, and sheep-farming in Australia.

Writing Sexton Blake Tales

Legend has it that while travelling by ship to England from Australia in early 1912, Teed met Mrs. Margaret Sempill the widow of Ernest Sempill, a talented and popular Sexton Blake author who wrote under the name Michael Storm for The Union Jack and other publications owned by the Amalgamated Press. Sempill had died in Australia and left notes for a few uncompleted manuscripts. Teed convinced Mrs. Sempill to let him finish the works and submit them under her husband's name. Over the summer of 1912 the partnership, with Teed at the typewriter and Mrs. Storm making the sales, produced four tales that were sold to Boys' Friend: Sexton Blake’s Double (unpublished), ’Twixt Fire and Redskin (Published 16 November 1912), and The Kidnapped Ambassador (Published 30 November 1912).

In 1912 Teed published the first tale in the Union Jack, Dead Man's Shoes. In all, the partnership sold 17 stories to Union Jack but came to an end when Mrs. Sempill and Teed fell out, possibly over money. In 1913 Teed went to the offices of the Amalgamated Press to disclose that he was the author behind the stories recently sold to them by Mrs. Storm. Though sceptical, editor W. H. Back sat him down at a typewriter in the office, saying: "Write me two chapters of a Blake yarn." Teed did so and in such style that his credentials were no longer in question. From that point on, Teed became a regular contributor of the Union Jack and other Amalgamated Press publications.

The Teed era began in 1913 with the creation of three characters: Yvonne Cartier, a female criminal who sets out to avenge her family in an eight-part story; Dr. Huxton Rymer, a surgeon who turns to a life of crime; and Prince Wu Ling, a member of the Chinese imperial family seeking world domination.

For fans, 1913 was the start of the Sexton Blake Golden Age and Teed played no small part in it. He wrote eighteen tales that year, seventeen of which were published in The Union Jack, setting the record for most stories published by a single author in that story paper He wrote the Easter, Summer and Christmas double issues for 1913. The Sacred Sphere the 1913, Christmas double issue, includes all three of the characters he introduced: Yvonne Cartier, Dr. Huxton Rymer and Prince Wu Ling. It is considered one of the best Sexton Blake tales of all time. He would continue to write many of the double issues in the following years and began introducing even more new characters in 1914.

Teed wrote for many of the Amalgamated Press' publications including; The Boys' Friend Library, Boys Realm, Boys Journal and Answers Library. In 1915 he was asked to write the debut story for The Sexton Blake Library

With the outbreak of World War I Teed joined the King Edward's Horse, a Canadian troop, and served in France. Later he was stationed in Dublin, where he became very ill with pneumonia. Invalided out of the service he took a post in Southern India. Later as branch manager of an export firm he met his future wife, Inez Annie Dunning, at a fancy dress ball. They were married in 1920, and moved back to London in 1921. He resumed his writing career and began publishing Sexton Blake Stories in 1922. That year he was commissioned to write the milestone 1000th issue of the Union Jack, The Thousandth Chance, a tale that included many of the major characters in the Sexton Blake Universe. In the following year he became only the third author to have written over 100 Blake stories, after William Murray Graydon and Andrew Murray.

Other Detectives and Other Publications

Teed’s detective fiction was not limited to the exploits of Sexton Blake; he wrote for hire for other detective story papers as well. In 1915 he began writing stories for The Nelson Lee Library a popular story paper that featured Nelson Lee, one of Blake's greatest rivals. Teed produced over thirty tales featuring Nelson Lee over the course of the next two years. Like he had done for Blake, Teed created a female adversary for Lee: Mademoiselle Miton, The Black Wolf, a cross-dressing jujitsu master whose tales stretched over 17 episodes. In the 1930s, he had detective Dixon Hawke match wits with villainess Nicolette Lazare, the Black Angel, in a half-dozen tales in the pages of The Dixon Hawke Library.

Teed continued writing throughout the 1930s, writing for The Sexton Blake Library, Union Jack, Detective Weekly, The Thriller, The Ranger and Modern Wonder. He also published several novels including Murder Ship (1935) Five in Fear(1936) and Voodoo Island (1939).

Films

Several of Teed's works were adapted for the silver screen. The Clue of the Wax Vesta released in 1914 told the tale of Yvonne's Cartier attempt to avenge her family. The Clue of the Second Goblet released in 1928 was based on a story of the same name. In 1935 his story They Shall Repay was adapted into the feature film Sexton Blake and the Mademoiselle starring George Curzon.

Death

In the late 1930s Teed developed a serious bronchial illness. He died of heart failure in London Hospital in Whitechapel on Christmas Eve, 1938.

== Influence and legacy ==
Though the male adversaries that Teed crafted were indeed formidable – none more so than Prince Wu Ling, Hammerton Palmer, Prince Menes, and Dr. Huxton Rymer, (his favourite character), – it was the female foes that Teed pitted against Sexton Blake that are among his most memorable. Those include Yvonne Cartier, Marie-Galante, Muriel Marl, Vali Mata-Vali, Lola de Guise, and Roxane Harfield, the first female master criminal from his home province of New Brunswick. In those creations, Teed changed the way women were portrayed in the story papers. Before him, women in the Blake adventures were typically associated with anarchist movements, gold-digging, or with various forms of blackmail. Teed’s heroines were much more emancipated and complex, pursuing crime for pleasure, profit, and power.

Unlike many of his Union Jack contemporaries, Teed's writing was not concerned with the nuts and bolts of detection. "His strength" writes Steve Holland, in G.H.Teed (1886-1938). A Life of Adventure, "was his ability to create an atmosphere. He was an adventure writer, creating thrillers set in exotic locations, and often Blake was subservient to the atmosphere, although it can never be said that the stories became purely travelogues. His contribution to Blake was to give him the world to play in: South America, China, Haiti, Russia, Paris, the Middle East, Australia, although he also used London and its environs in some stories."

By career’s end, in 1938, Teed had published a total of 299 Sexton Blake tales in various publications, making him the most prolific Blake author of all time.

== Biography and New Collections ==
- G.H.Teed (1886-1938). A Life of Adventure. A Biography and Bibliography. By Steve Holland. Published by Watford: Norman Wright, 2001
- The Sexton Blake Casebook (1987)
- The Sexton Blake Detective Library (1989)
- The Casebook of Sexton Blake (2009)
- Sexton Blake, Detective (2009)
- Sexton Blake: The Master Criminals (2020)
- Sexton Blake: Yvonne's Vengeance (2020)
- Sexton Blake: Rymer and Wu Ling (2020)
- Sexton Blake: Wu Ling Strikes Again (2020)
- Sexton Blake: Cunning Schemes (2020)
- Sexton Blake: Palmer and Beauremon (2022)
- Sexton Blake: Dawn of the Great War (2023)
- Nelson Lee: The Black Wolf Files (2020)

== Bibliography: Novels ==
- Murderers Meet. London, Wright & Brown, 1934. (Uncredited. Collaboration with Gwyn Evans, Robert Murray Graydon and G. N. Philips)
- Murder Ship, London, Stanley Smith, 1935
- The Hand of Vengeance, Dublin & London, Mellifont Press, 1935.
- Missing at Lloyds, Dublin & London, Mellifont Press, 1935.
- The Mitcham Murder Mystery, Dublin & London, Mellifont Press, 1935.
- Mystery on the Broads, Dublin & London, Mellifont Press, 1935.
- The Shadow Crook, London, Stanley Smith, 1936.
- Five in Fear. London, Stanley Smith, 1936.
- Spies Ltd, London, Wright & Brown, 1938.
- Crooks’ Vendetta (as Hamilton Teed), London, Columbine, 1939.
- Voodoo Island (as Hamilton Teed), London, Columbine, 1939.
- Bottom of Suez (as Hamilton Teed), London, Columbine, 1939.

== Adventure Tales ==
1912

- THE BOYS' FRIEND 597• ’Twixt Fire and Redskin • Anon.
- THE BOYS' FRIEND 599• The Kidnapped Ambassador • Anon.

== Sexton Blake Stories ==
1912

- THE UNION JACK 477 • Dead Men's Shoes • Anon.

1913

- THE BOYS' FRIEND LIBRARY 228 • The Great Mining Swindle • Anon.
- THE UNION JACK 485 • Beyond Reach of the Law • Anon.
- THE UNION JACK 488 • When Greek Meets Greek • Anon.
- THE UNION JACK 492 • On the Brink of Ruin • Anon.
- THE UNION JACK 493 • The Diamond Dragon • Anon.
- THE UNION JACK 495 • Settling Day • Anon.
- THE UNION JACK 498 • A Minister of the Crown • Anon.
- THE UNION JACK 501 • The Detective Airman • Anon.
- THE UNION JACK 505 • The Missing Guests • Anon.
- THE UNION JACK 507 • The Brotherhood of the Yellow Beetle • Anon.
- THE UNION JACK 509 • By Right of Possession • Anon.
- THE UNION JACK 510 • The Idol's Spell • Anon.
- THE UNION JACK 512 • The Yellow Sphinx • Anon.
- THE UNION JACK 518 • The Black Jewel Case • Anon.
- THE UNION JACK 519 • The White Mandarin • Anon.
- THE UNION JACK 526 • The Yellow Octopus • Anon.
- THE UNION JACK 528 • The Mystery of Walla-Walla • Anon.
- THE UNION JACK 529 • The Sacred Sphere • Anon.

1914

- THE UNION JACK 543 • The Grey Domino • Anon.
- THE UNION JACK 548 • The Case of the Radium Patient • Anon.
- THE UNION JACK 552 • The Pirated Cargo • Anon.
- THE UNION JACK 555 • The Council of Eleven • Anon.
- THE UNION JACK 558 • The Death Club • Anon.
- THE UNION JACK 559 • The Lost King • Anon.
- THE UNION JACK 560 • The Mountaineer's Secret • Anon.
- THE UNION JACK 564 • The Crimson Pearl • Anon.
- THE UNION JACK 571 • A Fight for an Earldom • Anon.
- THE UNION JACK 573 • The Sweater's Punishment • Anon.
- THE UNION JACK 576 • The Refugee • Anon.
- THE UNION JACK 579 • A Voice From the Dead • Anon.
- THE UNION JACK 582 • The Great Cigarette Mystery • Anon.
- THE UNION JACK 584 • A Soldier — and a Man • Anon.

1915

- PLUCK 555 • The Prize Ship (part 1) • Anon.
- PLUCK 556 • The Prize Ship (part 2) • Anon.
- THE SEXTON BLAKE LIBRARY 1 • The Yellow Tiger • Anon.
- THE UNION JACK 588 • The Case of the German Colony • Anon.
- THE UNION JACK 591 • The Mystery of the Banana Plantation • Anon.
- THE UNION JACK 594 • The Conniston Diamonds • Anon.
- THE UNION JACK 596 • The Case Of the Poisoned Telephones • Anon.
- THE UNION JACK 597 • The Army Contract Scandal • Anon.
- THE UNION JACK 599 • The Vengeance of the Eleven • Anon.
- THE UNION JACK 607 • The Quest of the Grey Panther • Anon.
- THE UNION JACK 613 • Scoundrels All • Anon.
- THE UNION JACK 614 • The Secret of Kilchester Towers • Anon.
- THE UNION JACK 616 • Bribery and Corruption • Anon.
- THE UNION JACK 618 • Sexton Blake - Pirate • Anon.
- THE UNION JACK 622 • The Case of the Cabinet Minister • Anon.
- THE UNION JACK 623 • The Case of the 'Frisco Leper • Anon.
- THE UNION JACK 631 • The Man With the Scarred Neck • Anon.
- THE UNION JACK 633 • Fugitives From Justice • Anon.

1916

- THE SEXTON BLAKE LIBRARY 11 • The Two Mysteries • Anon.
- THE UNION JACK 639 • At the Turn of the Hour • Anon.
- THE UNION JACK 656 • The Island of Fear • Anon.
- THE UNION JACK 663 • The Case of the Missing Princess • Anon.
- THE UNION JACK 669 • A 'Corner' in Vanilla • Anon.
- THE UNION JACK 685 • The Blue God • Anon.

1917

- THE SEXTON BLAKE LIBRARY 37 • The Diamond Sunburst • Anon.
- THE UNION JACK 692 • The Sunken Schooner • Anon.
- THE UNION JACK 697 • The Broken Span • Anon.
- THE UNION JACK 701 • The Black Rat • Anon.
- THE UNION JACK 703 • The Emerald Necklace • Anon.
- THE UNION JACK 706 • The Crest of the Flood • Anon.
- THE UNION JACK 707 • The Opium Smugglers • Anon.
- THE UNION JACK 710 • At the Full of the Moon • Anon.
- THE UNION JACK 712 • A Case of Extradition • Anon.
- THE UNION JACK 714 • The Three Millionaires • Anon.
- THE UNION JACK 715 • Uncut Diamonds • Anon.
- THE UNION JACK 718 • The Case of the Lorimer Twins • Anon.
- THE UNION JACK 722 • The Case of Reincarnation • Anon.
- THE UNION JACK 723 • The Secret Hand • Anon.
- THE UNION JACK 727 • The Pearls of Silence • Anon.
- THE UNION JACK 728 • The Case of the Crimson Terror • Anon.
- THE UNION JACK 731 • The Invisible Ray • Anon.

1922

- THE SEXTON BLAKE LIBRARY 219 • The Ivory Screen • Anon.
- THE SEXTON BLAKE LIBRARY 229 • The Spirit Smugglers • Anon.
- THE SEXTON BLAKE LIBRARY 233 • The Diamond Dragon • Anon.
- THE SEXTON BLAKE LIBRARY 253 • The Case of the Courtlandt Jewels • Anon.
- THE UNION JACK 958 • The Convict Millionaire • Anon.
- THE UNION JACK 959 • The Case of the Polish Refugee • Anon.
- THE UNION JACK 963 • The Affair of the Patagonian Devil • Anon.
- THE UNION JACK 964 • A Chinese Puzzle • Anon.
- THE UNION JACK 965 • The Black Vendetta • Anon.
- THE UNION JACK 971 • Count Flambert's Crime • Anon.
- THE UNION JACK 977 • The Wireless Telephone Clue • Anon.
- THE UNION JACK 980 • The Case of the Winfield Handicap • Anon.
- THE UNION JACK 981 • Sexton Blake's Blunder • Anon.
- THE UNION JACK 982 • The Affair of the Rickshaw Coolie • Anon.
- THE UNION JACK 984 • The Voodoo Curse • Anon.
- THE UNION JACK 986 • The White Rajah • Anon.
- THE UNION JACK 990 • The Broken Circle • Anon.
- THE UNION JACK 991 • The Bandits of Bruyeres • Anon.
- THE UNION JACK 994 • The Soap Salvors • Anon.
- THE UNION JACK 997 • The Mystery of the Big Woods • Anon.
- THE UNION JACK 1,000 • The Thousandth Chance • Anon.
- THE UNION JACK 1,001 • The Diamond Special • Anon.

1923

- THE SEXTON BLAKE LIBRARY 271 • The Secret Emerald Mines • Anon.
- THE SEXTON BLAKE LIBRARY 283 • The Eight Pointed Star • Anon.
- THE SEXTON BLAKE LIBRARY 307 • The Crimson Belt • Anon.
- THE SEXTON BLAKE LIBRARY 312 • The Orloff Diamond • Anon.
- THE UNION JACK 1,004 • The Palace of Mystery • Anon.
- THE UNION JACK 1,008 • A Strange Legacy • Anon.
- THE UNION JACK 1,014 • The Pearls of Benjemasin • Anon.
- THE UNION JACK 1,015 • The Painted Window • Anon.
- THE UNION JACK 1,016 • The Brand of the I. D. B. • Anon.
- THE UNION JACK 1,017 • The Case of the Indian Fakir • Anon.
- THE UNION JACK 1,018 • The Sceptre of Solomon • Anon.
- THE UNION JACK 1,020 • The Mystery of the Moving Mountain • Anon.
- THE UNION JACK 1,023 • The Tabu of Confucius • Anon.
- THE UNION JACK 1,026 • The Slave of the Thieves' Market • Anon.
- THE UNION JACK 1,028 • Tinker — Wireless Operator • Anon.
- THE UNION JACK 1,031 • The Adventure of the Giant Bean • Anon.
- THE UNION JACK 1,033 • The Hyena of Paris • Anon.
- THE UNION JACK 1,035 • The Affair of the Lacquered Walnut • Anon.
- THE UNION JACK 1,041 • The Hawk of the Peak • Anon.
- THE UNION JACK 1,042 • The Case of the Crippled Monk • Anon.
- THE UNION JACK 1,043 • The Case of the Golden Pebble • Anon.
- THE UNION JACK 1,047 • Huxton Rymer — President • Anon.
- THE UNION JACK 1,048 • The Black Eagle • Anon.
- THE UNION JACK 1,049 • The Straits of Mystery • Anon.
- THE UNION JACK 1,050 • The Case of the Six Rubber Balls • Anon.

1924

- THE SEXTON BLAKE LIBRARY 325 • The Great Ivory Swindle • Anon.
- THE SEXTON BLAKE LIBRARY 356 • The Case of the Clairvoyant's Ruse • Anon.
- THE SEXTON BLAKE LIBRARY 360 • The Case of the Jade-Handled Knife • Anon.
- THE UNION JACK 1,064 • The Street of Many Lanterns • Anon.
- THE UNION JACK 1,066 • The Green Portfolio • Anon.
- THE UNION JACK 1,067 • The Mummy's Twin • Anon.
- THE UNION JACK 1,081 • The Lizard Man • Anon.
- THE UNION JACK 1,083 • The Quest of the Jewelled Globe • Anon.
- THE UNION JACK 1,086 • The Case of the Strange Sickness • Anon.
- THE UNION JACK 1,089 • The Case of the Missing Athlete • Anon.
- THE UNION JACK 1,090 • Rogues of the 'Revontazin' • Anon.
- THE UNION JACK 1,092 • The Secret of the Bottle • Anon.
- THE UNION JACK 1,096 • The Affair of the Yellow Bricks • Anon.
- THE UNION JACK 1,100 • The Latin Quarter Mysteries • Anon.
- THE UNION JACK 1,105 • Sexton Blake's Xmas Truce • Anon.

1925

- THE SEXTON BLAKE LIBRARY 366 • The Mystery of the Seine • Anon.
- THE SEXTON BLAKE LIBRARY 371 • The Case of the Pink Macaw • Anon.
- THE SEXTON BLAKE LIBRARY 1 • The Secret of the Coconut Groves • Anon.
- THE SEXTON BLAKE LIBRARY 8 • The Case of the Ten Diamonds • Anon.
- THE SEXTON BLAKE LIBRARY 16 • The Clue of the Four Wigs • Anon.
- THE SEXTON BLAKE LIBRARY 19 • The Great Canal Plot • Anon.
- THE SEXTON BLAKE LIBRARY 21 • Under the Eagle's Wing • Anon.
- THE SEXTON BLAKE LIBRARY 25 • The Case of the Chinese Pearls • Anon.
- THE UNION JACK 1,109 • The Affair of the Tartan Box • Anon.
- THE UNION JACK 1,110 • The Treasure of Tortoise Island • Anon.
- THE UNION JACK 1,112 • The Adventure of the Blue Bowl • Anon.
- THE UNION JACK 1,113 • The House on the Cliff • Anon.
- THE UNION JACK 1,114 • The Crime of Stanley Trail • Anon.
- THE UNION JACK 1,120 • The Case of the Living Head • Anon.
- THE UNION JACK 1,121 • The Affair of the Empress' Little Finger • Anon.
- THE UNION JACK 1,122 • The Monte Carlo Mystery • Anon.
- THE UNION JACK 1,129 • The Man Who Won the 'Calcutta' • Anon.
- THE UNION JACK 1,141 • The Kidnapped Correspondent • Anon.
- THE UNION JACK 1,145 • The Affair of the Walnut Desk • Anon.
- THE UNION JACK 1,147 • The Adventure of the Five Giants • Anon.
- THE UNION JACK 1,148 • The Green Rose • Anon.
- THE UNION JACK 1,149 • Tinker's Secret • Anon.
- THE UNION JACK 1,150 • The Loyalty of Nirvana • Anon.
- THE UNION JACK 1,156 • Vendetta • Anon.
- THE UNION JACK 1,159 • Nirvana's Secret • Anon.

1926

- THE SEXTON BLAKE LIBRARY 35 • The Case of the Mummified Hand • Anon.
- THE SEXTON BLAKE LIBRARY 41 • The Island of the Guilty • Anon.
- THE SEXTON BLAKE LIBRARY 52 • The Black Emperor • Anon.
- THE SEXTON BLAKE LIBRARY 73 • The Riddle of the Russian Gold • Anon.
- THE UNION JACK 1,161 • The Mystery of the Painted Slippers • Anon.
- THE UNION JACK 1,166 • The Lumber Looters • Anon.
- THE UNION JACK 1,168 • Nirvana's Ordeal • Anon.
- THE UNION JACK 1,170 • The Adventure of the Bowery Tar Baby • Anon.
- THE UNION JACK 1,172 • The Clue of the Cracked Footprint • Anon.
- THE UNION JACK 1,177 • The Case of the Stricken Outpost • Anon.
- THE UNION JACK 1,194 • The Mystery of the Man from Manila • Anon.
- THE UNION JACK 1,198 • The Mystery of Room No. 7 • Anon.
- THE UNION JACK 1,199 • The Case of the Sheffield Ironmaster • Anon.
- THE UNION JACK 1,200 • The Affair of the Derelict Grange • Anon.
- THE UNION JACK 1,201 • The Mystery of the Venetian Palace • Anon.
- THE UNION JACK 1,202 • The Clue of the Two Straws • Anon.
- THE UNION JACK 1,203 • A Mystery of the Mountains • Anon.
- THE UNION JACK 1,208 • The Adventure of the Two Devils • Anon.

1927

- THE SEXTON BLAKE LIBRARY 77 • The Terror of Tangier • Anon.
- THE SEXTON BLAKE LIBRARY 82 • The Night-Club Mystery • Anon.
- THE SEXTON BLAKE LIBRARY 85 • The Rogues' Republic • Anon.
- THE SEXTON BLAKE LIBRARY 89 • The Tiger of Canton • Anon.
- THE SEXTON BLAKE LIBRARY 113 • The Case of the Disguised Apache • Anon.
- THE SEXTON BLAKE LIBRARY 119 • The Mystery of the Film City • Anon.
- THE UNION JACK 1,224 • The Adventure of the Yellow Beetle • Anon.
- THE UNION JACK 1,225 • The Temple of Many Visions • Anon.
- THE UNION JACK 1,226 • Doomed to the Dragon • Anon.
- THE UNION JACK 1,227 • The House of the Wooden Lanterns • Anon.
- THE UNION JACK 1,236 • The Black Abbot of Cheng-Tu (part 1) • Anon.
- THE UNION JACK 1,237 • The Black Abbot of Cheng-Tu (part 2) • Anon.
- THE UNION JACK 1,238 • The Black Abbot of Cheng-Tu (part 3) • Anon.
- THE UNION JACK 1,239 • The Black Abbot of Cheng-Tu (part 4) • Anon.
- THE UNION JACK 1,240 • The Black Abbot of Cheng-Tu (part 5) • Anon.
- THE UNION JACK 1,241 • The Black Abbot of Cheng-Tu (part 6) • Anon.
- THE UNION JACK 1,242 • The Black Abbot of Cheng-Tu (part 7) • Anon.
- THE UNION JACK 1,243 • The Black Abbot of Cheng-Tu (part 8) • Anon.
- THE UNION JACK 1,244 • The Black Abbot of Cheng-Tu (part 9) • Anon.
- THE UNION JACK 1,245 • The Black Abbot of Cheng-Tu (part 10) • Anon.
- THE UNION JACK 1,246 The Black Abbot of Cheng-Tu (part 11) • Anon.
- THE UNION JACK 1,247 • The Black Abbot of Cheng-Tu (part 12) • Anon.
- THE UNION JACK 1,248 • The Black Abbot of Cheng-Tu (part 13) • Anon.
- THE UNION JACK 1,249 • The Black Abbot of Cheng-Tu (part 14) • Anon.
- THE UNION JACK 1,250 • The Black Abbot of Cheng-Tu (part 15) • Anon.
- THE UNION JACK 1,251 • The Black Abbot of Cheng-Tu (part 16) • Anon.
- THE UNION JACK 1,252 • The Black Abbot of Cheng-Tu (part 17) • Anon.
- THE UNION JACK 1,253 • The Black Abbot of Cheng-Tu (part 18) • Anon.
- THE UNION JACK 1,254 • The Black Abbot of Cheng-Tu (part 19) • Anon.
- THE UNION JACK 1,255 • The Affair of the Rotten Rails • Anon.
- THE UNION JACK 1,256 • The Clue of the Second Goblet • Anon.
- THE UNION JACK 1,262 • The Adventure of the Green Imps • Anon.
- THE UNION JACK 1,263 • The Terror of the Pit • Anon.

1928

- THE SEXTON BLAKE LIBRARY 128 • The Case of the Portuguese Giantess • Anon.
- THE SEXTON BLAKE LIBRARY 129 • The Adventure of the Bogus Sheik • Anon.
- THE SEXTON BLAKE LIBRARY 134 • The Victim of Black Magic • Anon.
- THE SEXTON BLAKE LIBRARY 144 • The Case of the Bogus Monk • Anon.
- THE SEXTON BLAKE LIBRARY 147 • The Rubber Smugglers • Anon.
- THE SEXTON BLAKE LIBRARY 153 • The Adventure of the Voodoo Queen • Anon.
- THE SEXTON BLAKE LIBRARY 158 • The Terror of Gold-Digger Creek • Anon.
- THE SEXTON BLAKE LIBRARY 161 • Crooks in Clover • Anon.
- THE SEXTON BLAKE LIBRARY 165 • The Eighth Millionaire • Anon.
- THE UNION JACK 1,264 • The Treasure of the 'Isabella' • Anon.
- THE UNION JACK 1,291 • The Legion of the Lost • Anon.
- THE UNION JACK 1,305 • Poisoned Blossoms • Anon.
- THE UNION JACK 1,306 • The House of Fear • Anon.
- THE UNION JACK 1,309 • The Affair of the Six Ikons • Anon.
- THE UNION JACK 1,311 • The Case of the Scented Orchid • Anon.
- THE UNION JACK 1,315 • The Case of the Captive Emperor • Anon.

1929

- THE SEXTON BLAKE LIBRARY 175 • The Mystery of the Man from Rio • Anon.
- THE SEXTON BLAKE LIBRARY 178 • The Gunmen • Anon.
- THE SEXTON BLAKE LIBRARY 183 • The Secret of the President's Daughter • Anon.
- THE SEXTON BLAKE LIBRARY 204 • The Cabaret Crime • Anon.
- THE SEXTON BLAKE LIBRARY 207 • The Pearls of Doom • Anon.
- THE SEXTON BLAKE LIBRARY 213 • The Prisoner of the Chateau • Anon.
- THE UNION JACK 1,318 • Presumed Dead • Anon.

1930

- THE SEXTON BLAKE LIBRARY 224 • The Crook of Marsden Manor • Anon.
- THE SEXTON BLAKE LIBRARY 230 • The Victim of the Gang • Anon.
- THE SEXTON BLAKE LIBRARY 236 • The Crook of Canada • Anon.
- THE SEXTON BLAKE LIBRARY 239 • Cassidy the Con Man • Anon.
- THE SEXTON BLAKE LIBRARY 247 • The Masked Killer • G. H. Teed
- THE SEXTON BLAKE LIBRARY 250 • The Secret of the Strong Room • G. H. Teed
- THE SEXTON BLAKE LIBRARY 253 • The House of Silence • G. H. Teed
- THE SEXTON BLAKE LIBRARY 262 • The Crook of Paris • G. H. Teed
- THE SEXTON BLAKE LIBRARY 265 • The Secret of the Thieves' Kitchen • G. H. Teed
- THE UNION JACK 1,368 • The Twilight Feather Case • G. H. Teed
- THE UNION JACK 1,378 • They Shall Repay • G. H. Teed
- THE UNION JACK 1,380 • The Man From Devil's Island • G. H. Teed
- THE UNION JACK 1,383 • The Brute of Saigon • G. H. Teed
- THE UNION JACK 1,388 • Hunted Down • G. H. Teed
- THE UNION JACK 1,390 • Jungle Justice • G. H. Teed
- THE UNION JACK 1,391 • Forestalled • G. H. Teed
- THE UNION JACK 1,396 • Blackmail • G. H. Teed
- THE UNION JACK 1,397 • Shanghaied • G. H. Teed
- THE UNION JACK 1,401 • Sinister Mill • G. H. Teed
- THE UNION JACK 1,410 • The Shuttered Room • G. H. Teed
- THE UNION JACK 1,418 • The Man From Chicago • G. H. Teed

1931

- THE SEXTON BLAKE LIBRARY 272 • The Crime On Gallows Hill • G. H. Teed
- THE SEXTON BLAKE LIBRARY 277 • The Yellow Skull • G. H. Teed
- THE SEXTON BLAKE LIBRARY 285 • The Crime of the Catacombs • G. H. Teed
- THE SEXTON BLAKE LIBRARY 293 • The House of Curtains • G. H. Teed
- THE SEXTON BLAKE LIBRARY 297 • Gang War • G. H. Teed
- THE SEXTON BLAKE LIBRARY 306 • The Cross-Channel Crime • G. H. Teed
- THE SEXTON BLAKE LIBRARY 310 • The Crook of Costa Blanca • G. H. Teed
- THE UNION JACK 1,421 • Voodoo Vengeance • G. H. Teed
- THE UNION JACK 1,432 • Black Spaniard Creek • G. H. Teed
- THE UNION JACK 1,438 • Yellow Guile • G. H. Teed
- THE UNION JACK 1,445 • Pearls of Peril • G. H. Teed
- THE UNION JACK 1,447 • Bootleg Island • G. H. Teed
- THE UNION JACK 1,448 • Piracy! • G. H. Teed
- THE UNION JACK 1,450 • Gangland Decree • G. H. Teed
- THE UNION JACK 1,452 • Lonely Farm • G. H. Teed
- THE UNION JACK 1,454 • Doomed to Devil's Island • G. H. Teed
- THE UNION JACK 1,458 • The Gang Girl • G. H. Teed
- THE UNION JACK 1,461 • Spanish Gold • G. H. Teed
- THE UNION JACK 1,465 • Doomed Ships • G. H. Teed
- THE UNION JACK 1,471 • Prisoner of the Harem • G. H. Teed

1932

- THE SEXTON BLAKE LIBRARY 319 • The Chinatown Mystery • G. H. Teed
- THE SEXTON BLAKE LIBRARY 333 • The Crook of Shanghai • G. H. Teed
- THE SEXTON BLAKE LIBRARY 343 • The House of Cellars • G. H. Teed
- THE SEXTON BLAKE LIBRARY 353 • The Phantom of the Creek • G. H. Teed
- THE SEXTON BLAKE LIBRARY 362 • The Crook of Monte Carlo • G. H. Teed
- THE UNION JACK 1,474 • Planned From Paris • G. H. Teed
- THE UNION JACK 1,478 • Lost in the Legion • G. H. Teed
- THE UNION JACK 1,482 • The Secret • G. H. Teed
- THE UNION JACK 1,487 • Revolt! • G. H. Teed
- THE UNION JACK 1,494 • Sexton Blake in Manchuria • G. H. Teed
- THE UNION JACK 1,495 • Arms to Wu Ling • G. H. Teed
- THE UNION JACK 1,497 • The Blood Brothers of Nan-Hu • G. H. Teed
- THE UNION JACK 1,503 • Honolulu Lure • G. H. Teed
- THE UNION JACK 1,506 • The Crime of the Creek • G. H. Teed
- THE UNION JACK 1,516 The Next Move (part 1) • G. H. Teed
- THE UNION JACK 1,520 • The Next Move (part 5) • G. H. Teed
- THE UNION JACK 1,524 •The Next Move (part 9) • G. H. Teed

1933

- DETECTIVE WEEKLY 3 • The Silent Woman • G. H. Teed
- DETECTIVE WEEKLY 6 • The Chocolate King Mystery • G. H. Teed
- DETECTIVE WEEKLY 12 • Perilous Pearls • G. H. Teed
- DETECTIVE WEEKLY 16 • Gambler's Gold • G. H. Teed
- DETECTIVE WEEKLY 22 • The Banker's Box • G. H. Teed
- DETECTIVE WEEKLY 25 • Frame-Up! • G. H. Teed
- DETECTIVE WEEKLY 31 • The Secret of the Slums • G. H. Teed
- DETECTIVE WEEKLY 36 • Black Traffic! • G. H. Teed
- DETECTIVE WEEKLY 40 • The Blood Brothers of Formosa • G. H. Teed
- THE SEXTON BLAKE LIBRARY 376 • The Isle of Horror • G. H. Teed
- THE SEXTON BLAKE LIBRARY 384 • Rogues of Ransom • G. H. Teed
- THE SEXTON BLAKE LIBRARY 391 • The Crook's Decoy • G. H. Teed
- THE SEXTON BLAKE LIBRARY 402 • The Mystery of the Old Age Pensioner • G. H. Teed
- THE UNION JACK 1,528 • The Next Move (part 13) • G. H. Teed

1934

- DETECTIVE WEEKLY 46 • The Affair of the Missing Financier • G. H. Teed
- THE SEXTON BLAKE LIBRARY 415 • Murder in Manchuria • G. H. Teed
- THE SEXTON BLAKE LIBRARY 441 • The Mystery of Cell 13 • G. H. Teed
- THE SEXTON BLAKE LIBRARY 456 • The Fatal Amulet • G. H. Teed
- DETECTIVE WEEKLY 101 • The Mystery of the Girl in Blue • G. H. Teed
- DETECTIVE WEEKLY 124 • Death in the Barber's Chair • G. H. Teed
- THE SEXTON BLAKE LIBRARY 463 • The Crimson Belt • G. H. Teed
- THE SEXTON BLAKE LIBRARY 474 • The Martello Tower Mystery • G. H. Teed
- THE SEXTON BLAKE LIBRARY 495 • The Mystery of the Cashiered Officer • G. H. Teed
- THE SEXTON BLAKE LIBRARY 536 • The Island of the Guilty • G. H. Teed
- THE SEXTON BLAKE LIBRARY 548 • The Dictator's Secret • G. H. Teed
- THE SEXTON BLAKE LIBRARY 590 • The Great Canal Plot • G. H. Teed
- DETECTIVE WEEKLY 265 • Limehouse Loot • G. H. Teed
- DETECTIVE WEEKLY 298 • The Adventure of the Pearl Pirates • G. H. Teed
- DETECTIVE WEEKLY 302 • The Trail of the Black Knight • G. H. Teed
- THE SEXTON BLAKE LIBRARY 608 • The Bailiff's Secret • G. H. Teed
- THE SEXTON BLAKE LIBRARY 615 • The Terror of Tangier • G. H. Teed
- THE SEXTON BLAKE LIBRARY 628 • The Tiger of Canton • G. H. Teed
- THE SEXTON BLAKE LIBRARY 640 • The Case of the Disguised Apache • G. H. Teed
- THE SEXTON BLAKE LIBRARY 644 • The Mystery of the Film City • G. H. Teed
- DETECTIVE WEEKLY 308 • The Island of Lost Men • G. H. Teed
- DETECTIVE WEEKLY 312 • The Trail of the Red Sombrero • G. H. Teed
- DETECTIVE WEEKLY 315 • The Wolf of Paris • G. H. Teed
- DETECTIVE WEEKLY 321 • Don Rico's Millions • G. H. Teed
- DETECTIVE WEEKLY 333 • The Gallows Hill Mystery • G. H. Teed
- DETECTIVE WEEKLY 346 • The Case of the Blazing Island • G. H. Teed
- DETECTIVE WEEKLY 351 • The Girl Who Made Pearls • G. H. Teed
- DETECTIVE WEEKLY 354 • The Case of the Purple Cotton • G. H. Teed
- DETECTIVE WEEKLY 355 • The Green Eye of Banyah • G. H. Teed
- DETECTIVE WEEKLY 357 • The Case of the Money King • G. H. Teed
- THE SEXTON BLAKE LIBRARY 663 • The Night Club Mystery • G. H. Teed
- THE SEXTON BLAKE LIBRARY 687 • The Case of the Bogus Monk • G. H. Teed
- THE SEXTON BLAKE LIBRARY 693 • The Rubber Smugglers • G. H. Teed

1940

- SEXTON BLAKE ANNUAL 2 • The One Who Knew • Anon. (Unknown) • Zenith the Albino • Anthony Skene (George N. Philips) • The Tartan Box • G. H. Teed • The Falcon of Fambridge • Anthony Skene (George N. Philips) • The Affair of Dingley Dell • Anon. (Unknown) • The Man I Killed • Rex Hardinge • Sexton Blake - Detective • Harold Blyth (Hal Meredeth) • The Man From Scotland Yard • Anon. (E. Sempill aka M. Storm)
- DETECTIVE WEEKLY 360 • The Council of Eleven • G. H. Teed
- DETECTIVE WEEKLY 365 • The Case of the Coniston Diamonds • G. H. Teed
- DETECTIVE WEEKLY 366 • The Vengeance of Yvonne • G. H. Teed
- DETECTIVE WEEKLY 367 • The Brotherhood of the Beetle • G. H. Teed
- DETECTIVE WEEKLY 371 • A Riddle in Red Leather • G. H. Teed
- THE SEXTON BLAKE LIBRARY 707 • The Mystery of Gold Digger Creek • G. H. Teed
- THE SEXTON BLAKE LIBRARY 718 • The Eighth Millionaire • G. H. Teed
- 1942
- SEXTON BLAKE ANNUAL 4 • Under Sexton Blake's Orders • Anon. (Unknown) • The Clue of the Crimson Snow • Donald Stuart • The Riddle of O.C. Balloon Barrage • Anon. (Unknown) • The Secret of the Slums • G. H. Teed • The Mystery of Mardale Pit • Anon. (Unknown) • The Case of the Seventh Key • Anon. (Unknown) • The Man Who Was Hammered • Anon. (Unknown) • Sinister Cliff • Rex Hardinge •

== Nelson Lee Stories ==
1915

- The Nelson Lee Library #15 The Spendthrift
- The Nelson Lee Library #17 The Black Wolf, 2 October 1915
- The Nelson Lee Library #18 The Case of the Duplicate Key
- The Nelson Lee Library #19 The Secret of the Swamp, 16 October 1915
- The Nelson Lee Library #22, Edges of Steel; or, The Apaches of Paris 6 November 1915
- The Nelson Lee Library #24 The Case of the Tube of Radium, 20 November 1915
- The Nelson Lee Library #26 The Crystal Urn, 4 December 1915

1916

- The Nelson Lee Library #30 A Mystery of Venice, 1 January 1916
- The Nelson Lee Library #31, The Frozen Man 8 January 1916
- The Nelson Lee Library #34 Robbery Wholesale, 29 January 1916
- The Nelson Lee Library #36, The Mystery Man of Lhassa, 12 February 1916
- The Nelson Lee Library #40 The Red Menace, 11 March 1916
- The Nelson Lee Library #43 The Robbery at Ponder's Bank
- The Nelson Lee Library #46 The Last of the Genghis, 22 April 1916
- The Nelson Lee Library #52 At Half Tide
- The Nelson Lee Library #55 The Man with Four Identities, 24 June 1916
- The Nelson Lee Library #58 The Crimson Disc, 15 July 1916
- The Nelson Lee Library #61 The Golden Boomerang, 5 August 1916
- The Nelson Lee Library #67 The Crook
- The Nelson Lee Library #69 The Mystery of Barron Hall
- The Nelson Lee Library #71 The Clue of the Raincoat
- The Nelson Lee Library #73 Blue Diamonds
- The Nelson Lee Library #79 The Mystery of the Closed Door, 9 December 1916
- The Nelson Lee Library #81 The Plantation Mystery

1917

- The Nelson Lee Library #83 The Broken Vase
- The Nelson Lee Library #86 The Great Air Mystery
- The Nelson Lee Library #89 A Stubborn Case
- The Nelson Lee Library #92 The Man Hunters
- The Nelson Lee Library # 107 Loot!
- The Nelson Lee Library #108 The Kidnapped Stockbroker

1920

- The Prairie Library #31-35 The Black Pearl
- The Prairie Library #36-41 A Dangerous Partnership
- The Prairie Library #42-50 The Missing Professor

== Young Yvonne Cartier Stories ==
1914

- THE BOYS' JOURNAL • Vol.III Issue 59 • 31/10/1914 THE LUST OF GOLD
- THE BOYS' JOURNAL • Vol.III Issue 61 • 14/11/1914 THE BUSHRANGER'S SECRET
- THE BOYS' JOURNAL • Vol.III Issue 64 • 05/12/1914 THE PEARL OF SAMU

1915

- THE BOYS' JOURNAL • Vol.III Issue 69 • 09/01/1915 THE LONE HORSEMAN
- THE BOYS' JOURNAL • Vol.III Issue 70 • 16/01/1915 THE LONE HORSEMAN (2)
- THE BOYS' JOURNAL • Vol.III Issue 71 • 23/01/1915 • THE LONE HORSEMAN (3)

== Dr. Huxton Rymer Stories ==
1915

- Pluck #537: A Haul by Proxy
- Pluck #539: The Globe of Fire
- Pluck #540: High Stakes

1916

- Pluck #588: Conspiracy
- Pluck #590: The Sacred Tooth of Buddha
- Pluck #591: Octopus Island
- Pluck #592: The Pearl Pirates
- Pluck #593: The Schooner Thieves
- Pluck #594: The Lost Galleon
- Pluck #595: The Mysterious Island

1916

- The Boys' Realm #721: A White Man’s Vengeance
- The Boys' Realm #722: The Mystery of the Tramp Steamer

== Dixon Hawke Stories ==
These stories feature Nicolette Lazare, Dixon Hawke's female foe.

- The Dixon Hawke Library #327: The Terror from Devil's Island (1932)
- The Dixon Hawke Library #349: The Return of the Black Angel (1933)
- The Dixon Hawke Library #368: Black Angel’s Last Bid (1933)
- The Dixon Hawke Library #384: The Queen of Crime (1934)
- The Dixon Hawke Library #398: The Black Angel Strikes Again (1935)
- The Dixon Hawke Library #565: The Black Angel’s Last Warning (1941)

Other Dixon Hawke tales

- The Dixon Hawke Library #478: The Man who Made Gold, 1936.
- The Dixon Hawke Library #485: Three Keys of Doom, 1938.
- The Dixon Hawke Library #490: The Vengeance of the Master, 1938.
- The Dixon Hawke Library #501: Yellow Face, 1939.
- The Dixon Hawke Library #506: Red Flame the Wrecker, 1939.

== The Shadow Crook ==
- The Shadow Crook's Secret, Detective Weekly 29 Feb 1936
- The Trail of the Shadow Crook, Detective Weekly 7 Mar 1936
- The Shadow Crook's Vengeance, Detective Weekly 14 Mar 1936

== Cort Jurgens ==
- Voodoo Gold!, The Thriller 17 Aug 1935
- Slave of Trickery, The Thriller 16 Nov 1935
- The Tiger of Tampico, The Thriller 19 Oct 1935
- The Banker of Monte Carlo, The Thriller 11 Jan 1936
- The Mystery of the Kidnapped Killer, The Thriller 18 Apr 1936
- The Snake's Secret, The Thriller 6 Jun 1936

== Black Abbott ==
- The Diamond Dragon, Modern Wonder 7 May 1938
- The Mandarin's Ear, Modern Wonder 21 May 1938
- Treachery of the Black Abbot, Modern Wonder 28 May 1938
- Monastery of the Silver Lakes, Modern Wonder 4 Jun 1938
- Peril of the Living Buddha, Modern Wonder 11 Jun 1938
- The Last Round!, Modern Wonder 18 Jun 1938

== Spies Ltd. ==
- Spies Ltd., Detective Weekly 16 Mar 1935
- The Mystery of Plan ’B6’, Detective Weekly 11 May 1935
- Spies in Singapore, Detective Weekly 15 Jun 1935

== Science fiction ==
Short stories featuring Professor Sampson Parr.

- The Strange Adventure of Professor Sampson Parr, Red Magazine #156, 1915
- The Disappearance of Dr. Coe, Red Magazine #158, 1915
- The Atom Smashers, Modern Wonder, 2 Oct 1937
- Invaders from Space, Modern Wonder, 16 Oct 1937
- Voyage Into Space, Modern Wonder, 30 Oct 1937
- The Mystery Crater, Modern Wonder, 20 Nov 1937
- The Dawn Men, Modern Wonder, 22 Jan 1938

== Romance ==
- A Love Awakened, Answers Library #371, 30 June 1917

Short Stories

- The White Knight, The Violet Magazine 2 Sep 1927
- The Third Laugh, The Violet Magazine 17 Aug 1928

== Other ==
- The Crook of Saigon, (ss) Detective Weekly 21 May 1938
- Death in the Palace, (ss) Detective Weekly 26 Oct 1935
- The Digger ’Tec, (sl) The Boys’ Friend 2 Jan, 9 Jan, 16 Jan, 23 Jan, 6 Feb, 13 Feb, 20 Feb 27 Feb 1926
- The Feranti Pearl, (ss) The Thriller 21 Sep 1935
- The Grey Ghost, (na) The Thriller 18 Jan 1930
- The Heart of Mohammed, (ss) Detective Weekly 3 Aug 1935
- Hounded Down, (na) The Thriller 30 May 1931
- Killer Aboard, (n.) Thriller Library #11 1934
- The Lost Road, (ss) Modern Wonder 16 Jul 1938
- The Man from Shanghai, (na) Thrilling Detective Jan 1932
- Mr Wong-Detective, (ss) The Ranger 2 Mar 1935
- Murder Loot, (na) Detective Novels Magazine Aug 1938
- Murder on the Riviera Express, (na) Detective Weekly 1 Jan 1938
- The Mystery of the Jade Amulet, (ss) Detective Weekly 26 Mar 1938
- The Plot of the Persian Oil King, (na) The Thriller 29 Apr 1933
- The Plunder of Santa Maria, (na) The Thriller Library 14 Jan 1939
- The Riddle of the Rose Diamond, (ss) Detective Weekly 23 Apr 1938
- The Secret of Red Valley, (na) Detective Weekly 19 Sep 1936
- The Secret of the Five Rings, (na) Detective Weekly 19 Oct 1935
- The Secret of the Marble Bacchante, (sl) Detective Weekly 21 May, 28 May, 4 Jun, 11 Jun, 18 Jun, 25 Jun, 2 Jul, 9 Jul, 16 Jul, 23 Jul 30 Jul 1938
- The Secret of the Three Prayer Wheels, (sl) Detective Weekly 9 Jan, 16 Jan, 23 Jan, 30 Jan, 6 Feb, 13 Feb, 20 Feb 27 Feb 1937
- Shanghai Nights, (na) The Thriller Library 26 Feb 1938
- Spanish Loot, (na) Detective Weekly 5 Jun 1937
- The Temple of the Tiger, (na) Detective Weekly 18 Sep 1937
- The Terror of Malabar, (na) The Thriller 19 Aug 1933
- Terror of the Reef, (ss) Modern Wonder 2 Jul 1938
- Third Degree, (na) The Thriller Library 5 Nov 1938
- The Three Gold Feathers, (sl) The Boys’ Friend 18 Jul, 8 Aug, 22 Aug, 29 Aug 5 Sep 1925
- The Tiger of Shanghai, (ss) Detective Weekly 12 Mar 1938
- Thrilling Adventures Jan 1937
- The Trail of the Four Assassins, (ss) Detective Weekly 30 Mar 1935
- The Xmas Party Crime, (na) Detective Weekly 21 Dec 1935
- Boys’ Life Apr 1938
- The Case of the Temple Dancing Girl, (ss) Detective Weekly 17 Aug 1935
- Chinese Gordon, (ss) Chums Annual, 1941 1940
