= Francis Richards =

Francis Richards may refer to:

- Francis Richards (diplomat) (born 1945), governor and commander-in-chief of Gibraltar
- Francis Richards (sailor) (1873–1955), British Olympic sailor
- Francis John Richards (1901–1965), English plant physiologist

== See also ==
- Frank Richards (disambiguation)
- Frances Richards (disambiguation), female version of the name
