= Franklin Richards =

Franklin Richards may refer to:

- Franklin D. Richards (Mormon apostle) (1821–1899), LDS Church apostle
- Franklin S. Richards (1849–1934), general counsel for the LDS Church in the late 19th century
- Franklin D. Richards (Mormon seventy) (1900–1987), former head of the U.S. Federal Housing Administration and a leader in the LDS Church
- Franklin Richards (character), fictional Marvel Comics character, son of Reed Richards and Susan Storm

== See also ==
- Frank Richards (disambiguation)
