= Modern Wonder =

British magazine

- Publisher: Odhams Press
- Founded: 1937
- Final issue: March 1941
- Country: Great Britain
- Language: English

Modern Wonder was a largely factual magazine aimed at boys and young men. It had many articles and pictures on science, engineering and warfare etc. In some of the magazines, the Flash Gordon comic strip is printed in colour on the back cover. Issues were always 16 pages in length, with the covers and inside two pages printed in colour. The magazine was printed in Great Britain by Odhams Press. The magazine was in a tabloid format, approximate dimensions 36 cm x 27 cm.

The magazine (cost twopence, every Wednesday) began publication in May 1937 under the title Modern Wonder, and went through a few name changes, becoming Modern Wonders in December 1939 and Modern World from March 1940 until the magazine stopped in March 1941, possibly due to wartime paper shortages in England.
