= Frank Richards (cricketer) =

Australian cricketer

Personal information
- Born: 15 October 1863; Castlemaine, Victoria, Australia
- Died: 29 July 1926 (aged 62); Fremantle, Australia

Domestic team information
- Years: Team
- 1890: Victoria
- Source: Cricinfo, 25 July 2015

Frank Richards (15 October 1863 – 29 July 1926) was an Australian cricketer. He played one first-class cricket match for Victoria in 1890.

== See also ==
- List of Victoria first-class cricketers
