= John William Staniforth =

British adventure and mystery author (1863–1927)

- Staniforth in 1915
- Born: 14 November 1863; Sheffield, England
- Died: 3 January 1927 (aged 63); Bamford
- Occupations: Doctor, writer
- Writing career
- Pen name: Maxwell Scott
- Period: 1894–1916
- Genres: Detective fiction, Adventure fiction

John William Staniforth (14 November 1863 – 3 January 1927) was a British writer who wrote under the pen-names Stain Cortley, John Andrews and Maxwell Scott.

He wrote primarily adventure and detective fiction. His most popular creation was the detective Nelson Lee, arguably one of the most popular detectives of the early 20th century.

== Life ==
Staniforth was born in Sheffield to William Staniforth and Sarah Parkin. In 1881 he joined the Sheffield Medical School and took the M.R.C.S and L.R.C.P diplomas in 1887, the year of the great small-pox epidemic at Sheffield. He was offered a post as temporary medical officer in charge of the Totely Hospital. Totely Hospital was a fever hospital and, isolated from the world, Staniforth began to write to pass the time. His first short story Told at Totely: A Romance of the Small-pox Hospital, was printed on March 10, 1887, in the Sheffield Weekly Telegraph under the pen name Stain Cortley. In 1888, after the epidemic ended, he was appointed Senior Assistant House Surgeon at the Sheffield Royal Hospital. He continued to write for the Sheffield papers, mostly stories of medical interest, local antiquarian or historical nature.

In 1891, he married Mary Jane Dobbin Maxwell, a nurse at Sheffield Royal Hospital and granddaughter of prolific Irish author, William Hamilton Maxwell. That same year he took up a practice at the Grinkle-Ironstone Mines at Hinderwell, serving as GP until 1927. He and his wife moved to Bamford after he retired. He died there in 1927. His remains were taken back to Hinderwell and his funeral was one of the largest seen in the district, a testimony to the popularity which he had won during his lifetime there.

=== Inspiration ===
Staniforth was greatly influenced by the work of Arthur Conan Doyle and was a great admirer of the Sherlock Holmes stories. He liked the way Doyle used medical technicalities in fiction and often used them in his own early stories. Staniforth's early work was written under the name Stain Cortley. The name derived from a letter addressed to him by that name. The correspondent had been unable to decipher Staniforth's handwriting and signature.

Maxwell Scott, the nom-de-plume he would use for the majority of his tales, was the combination of his wife's maiden name, and that of an old friend Mr. Scott who had recently died. He continued to use this rhythm of syllables in naming his most popular characters: Nelson Lee, Kenyon Ford, Vernon Read and Martin Dale. Of note, the name Nelson Lee was created on the spur of the moment a combination of two names, Mr. Nelson and Mr Lee, both strangers to him, that he had noticed on letters in his morning mail.

== Boys papers ==
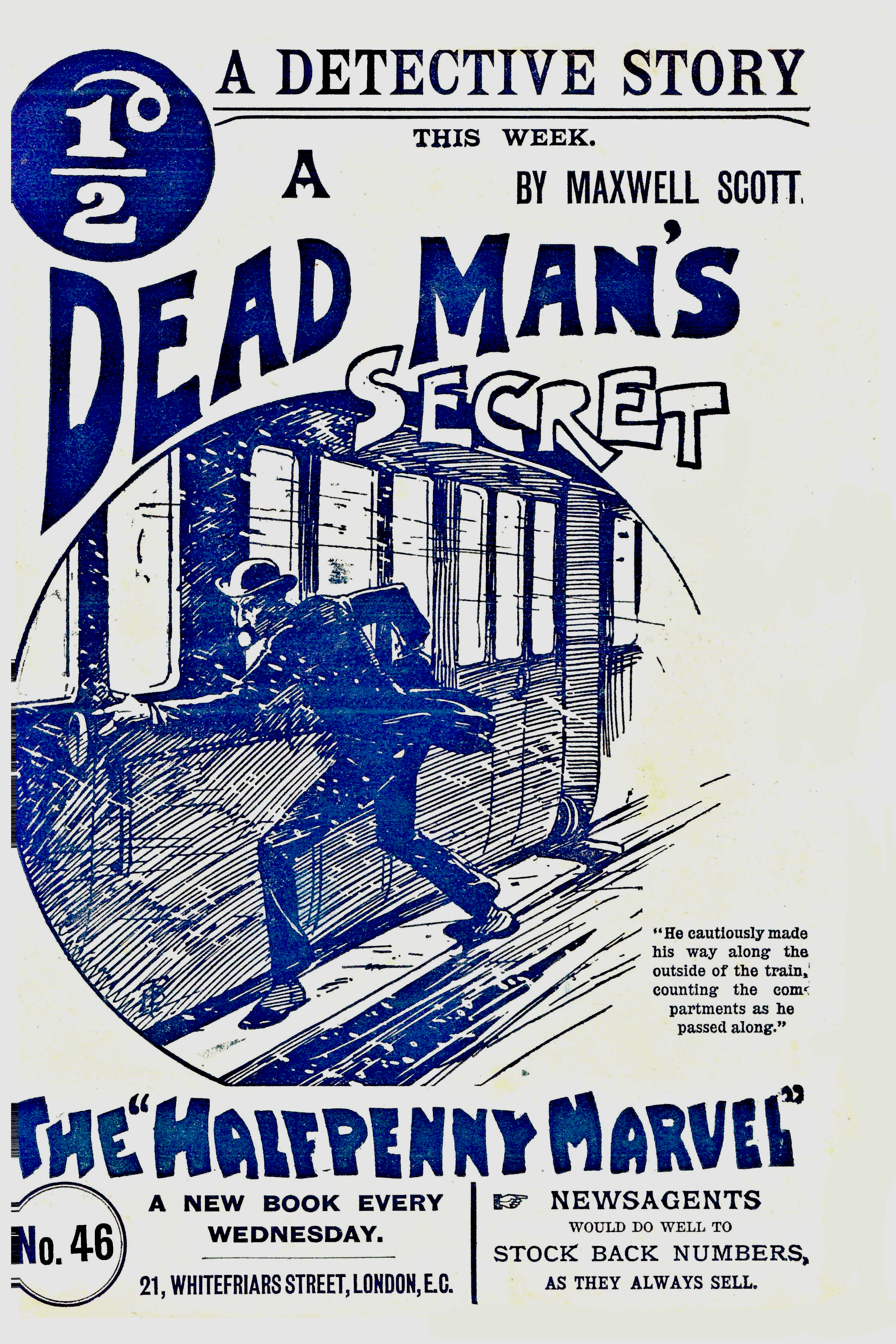
Nelson Lee's Debut: A Dead Man's Secret

After the birth of his son, Maxwell Staniforth in 1893, Staniforth turned to writing to supplement his income. On May 19, 1894, his first adventure tale, The Phantom-Dwarf; or, The Mystery of the Isle of Life, appeared in the Union Jack No. 4 under the pen-name Maxwell Scott. The Sister of Death, and The "Avenger’s" Quest, followed in Union Jack in July and August 1894. On September 19, the detective tale A Dead Man's Secret appeared in The Halfpenny Marvel No. 46. It starred detective Nelson Lee, the character that would become his most popular creation.

Staniforth would continue writing for the next twenty years, his work published in papers by owned by the Amalgamated Press, Pearson's and Cassell.

In 1915 the Amalgamated Press paid him £50 for the exclusive right to use the name Nelson Lee.

That same year it launched The Nelson Lee Library, a weekly paper devoted to stories about Nelson Lee and Nipper. Despite wartime restrictions, the paper achieved a circulation of 70,000 within its first three months. In all Scott would write just four stories for the paper that bore his most popular character's name:

A Miscarriage of Justice (#7), The Convict's Dilemma (#8), In Borrowed Plumes (13) and When Rogues Fall Out (#48). several of his earlier works would be reprinted in The Nelson Lee Library until it closed in 1933. Scott drew from his personal real life experiences for his non-detective work. Memories from his cricketer and footballer days informed his serial Hard Pressed which ran in Big Budget #121–163 in 1899. It is considered one of the first football stories and at the time was the longest football serial ever published. Staniforth wrote that the story was 'phenomenally popular' and earned him £205.16.0 the largest amount he had ever received for a single story.

== Detectives ==
By 1905 Staniforth had published some 200 tales. Among these were the exploits of five popular detectives: Nelson Lee, Gordon Gray, Kenyon Ford, Vernon Read and Martin Dale. A little known sixth detective named Nemo, had a short run of six stories in Dan Leno's Comic Journal in 1899 shortly before it folded.

Kenyon Ford 'The Up-To-Date-Detective' made his debut in Big Budget in The Secret of the Ruby Ring in 1897. He appeared in some forty tales in Big Budget over the next four years. Some of the most memorable titles include : Mystery of the York Express, The Missing Forward, The Rival Blues, Avenged on Xmas Day and The Poison King. He made his final appearance in The Seven Stars in 1902.

Gordon Gray 'The Greatest Living Detective' made his debut in The League of the Crimson Star in the Halfpenny Marvel No. 253 in September, 1898. It was followed by Vendetta, The Whitby Abbey Mystery and The Stolen Despatches, a Pluck double Christmas issue where he teamed up with Nelson Lee.

Vernon Read made his debut in The Iron Skull in Boys' Leader No. 12 1903. The serial was followed by Red Hand in the Boys' Leader and Hidden Gold and Lorimer's Legacy in the Big Budget.

In January 1908, Martin Dale, 'the most famous private detective in Europe', Staniforth's fifth detective made his debut in On the Watch in Chums No. 800. Other stories include: A Perilous Quest, Secret of the Ring, Double Six, and the Silver Key.

Staniforth also penned several Sexton Blake tales. His first was Sexton Blake, The Clique of Death, a 20-part serial for The Jester and Wonder. It ran from issues No. 174 to 193, from March 11 to July 15, 1905. Set in 1889, the tale recounted the events of Blake's first big case, the one that made his reputation. He also wrote the first Sexton Blake short stories for Answers Weekly writing 32 tales in all between 1908 and 1909. In 1909 he paired Sexton Blake with Nelson Lee in The Winged Terror, a tale that ran in issues #329–336 of Boys' Herald.

Staniforth's last contribution to the Blake saga was the creation of Blake foe The Scorpion, a series of 7 tales that ran in The Union Jack in 1913 and 1914. These include: The Secret Report, The Missing Heiress, The Golden Calf, The Secret of the Well, The Case From the Clouds, The Madman's Fortune and The Sixpenny Doctor.

Among the many stories he wrote Staniforth singled out three detective tales that gave him great enjoyment: The Silver Dwarf (Nelson Lee), The Iron Skull (Vernon Read) and The Seven Stars (Kenyon Ford). Wood, writing in Story Paper Collectors' Digest related that "At the end of his work on The Iron Skull he happened to see in an antique shop a diminutive charm in the form of a tiny metal skull with two garnets set in the eye sockets. He immediately bought it and gave it to his wife in memory of the story it had given him as much pleasure to write.

== Adventure stories: select bibliography ==
- The Phantom-Dwarf; or, The Mystery of the Isle of Life, Union Jack No. 4, 1894
- The Sister of Death, Union Jack No. 12, 1894 as Herbert Maxwell.
- The "Avenger’s" Quest; or, The Scourge of the South Atlantic, Union Jack No. 18, 1894
- Count Conrad's Gold, Union Jack No. 212, 1898
- The Presumption of Jonathan Dawes, The Idler, October 1898
- The Rival Squatters, Big Budget, 1902
- A Dangerous Experiment, Big Budget, 1902
- A Slip of the Pen, Boys' Realm, 1902
- The White Slave, Big Budget, 1904

=== New collections ===
- Sexton Blake: The Early Years (2020) features the first 5 Nelson Lee cases by Maxwell Scott, includes Christmas Clues the first Nelson Lee/Sexton Blake co-appearance.
- Sexton Blake: The Master Criminals (2020) features the first Scorpion storyThe Secret Report by Maxwell Scott
- Nelson Lee: The Scott Files (2021) Includes Birds of Prey, The Silver Dwarf, and The Missing Heir.
- Sexton Blake: The Clique of Death (2022) Also features the origin stories of Sexton Blake and Kenyon Ford.
