= Frances Richards =

Frances Richards may refer to:

- Frances Richards (Canadian artist) (1852–1934), Canadian painter
- Frances Richards (British artist) (1903–1985), British painter and illustrator
- Frances Richards (actress), actress in The Living Ghost
- Fran Richards, character in Emergency Hospital (film)

== See also ==
- Francis Richards (disambiguation), male version of the name
