= Edwy Searles Brooks =

British writer (1889–1965)

- Born: 11 November 1889; Hackney, London, England
- Died: 2 December 1965 (aged 76)
- Occupation: Writer
- Spouse: Frances Goldstein (m. 1918)
- Children: 1
- Writing career
- Pen name: Berkeley Gray, Victor Gunn, Rex Madison, Carlton Ross
- Period: 1907 – 1965
- Genre: Adventure fiction

Edwy Searles Brooks (11 November 1889 – 2 December 1965) was a British novelist who also wrote under the pen-names Berkeley Gray, Victor Gunn, Rex Madison, Reginald Browne, and Carlton Ross. Brooks was born in Hackney, London. He is believed to have written around 40 million words.

== Life and work ==
Brooks was one of four sons (there was also a daughter) of George Brooks, a Congregational minister and well-known political writer including for The Times. When the family relocated to Norfolk, Brooks attended Banham Grammar School in that county. His first name was a Welsh form of "Edwin"; his second a grandmother's surname. Brooks published his first short story, "Mr Dorien's Missing £2000", in July 1907, when he was seventeen. His first major breakthrough came in 1910, when the paper The Gem gave him an assignment to publish a serial named "The Iron Island", the main character being Frank Kingston.

In 1912, he wrote his first Sexton Blake stories and in 1915 started writing Nelson Lee detective stories for The Nelson Lee Library, becoming the lead writer of the detective series after which the publication was named. In 1917, he started the St. Frank's series in that paper, the stories for which he is best remembered. Additional serial assignments followed, including those featuring Clive Derring and Sexton Blake. In 1918, he launched the character of Rupert Waldo, an early superhero.

In 1918, he married Frances (daughter of master tailor Abraham Goldstein), who became his assistant and collaborator through the years. The two took great pride in delivering clean manuscripts for publication throughout their careers. They became a cornerstone of the Amalgamated Press imprints. Their son, Lionel (born 1928), wrote Conquest Calls The Tune (1968) with his mother, and 1969's Conquest in Ireland alone.

In the 1920s, Brooks created the character of Marko the Miracle Man a scientist/inventor/adventurer who became one of Dixon Hawke's most popular foes. Debuting in The Glendale Lodge Mystery in The Dixon Hawke Library #116, he matched wits repeatedly with the detective over the next 14 years, until his final appearance in Adventure #1200.

The magazines that had published his stories started running into financial trouble in the 1930s, and Brooks started publishing hardcover novels for the adult market in 1938 with the first novel in the Norman Conquest series under pseudonyms. His serialised novels included the Norman Conquest and Ironsides Cromwell stories. Dare-Devil Conquest formed the basis for the 1954 movie Park Plaza 605 starring Tom Conway.

=== The Norman Conquest Novels (writing as Berkeley Gray) ===
1. Mr Mortimer Gets the Jitters (1938)
2. Vultures, Ltd. (1938)
3. Conquest Marches On (1939)
4. Leave It to Conquest (1939)
5. Miss Dynamite (1939)
6. Conquest Takes All (1940)
7. Convict 1066 (1940)
8. Meet the Don (1940)
9. Six to Kill (1940)
10. Six Feet of Dynamite (1941)
11. Thank You, Mr. Conquest (1941)
12. The Gay Desperado (1944)
13. Alias Norman Conquest (1945)
14. Blonde For Danger (1945)
15. The Conquest Touch (1948)
16. The Spot Marked X (1948)
17. Killer Conquest (1949)
18. Dare-devil Conquest (1950)
19. Duel Murder (1950)
20. Seven Dawns to Death (1950)
21. Conquest in Scotland (1951)
22. Operation Conquest (1951)
23. The Lady Is Poison (1952)
24. The Half-Open Door (1953)
25. Target for Conquest (1953)
26. Conquest Goes West (1954)
27. Follow the Lady (1954)
28. Turn Left for Danger (1955)
29. Conquest in Command (1956)
30. The House of the Lost (1956)
31. Conquest After Midnight (1957)
32. Conquest Goes Home (1957)
33. Conquest in California (1958)
34. Death On the Hit Parade (1958)
35. Mr. Ball of Fire (1958)
36. The Big Brain (1959)
37. Murder and Co (1959)
38. Conquest On the Run (1960)
39. Nightmare House (1960)
40. Call Conquest for Danger (1961)
41. Get Ready to Die (1961)
42. Conquest in the Underworld (1962)
43. Cavalier Conquest (1963)
44. Count Down for Conquest (1963)
45. Castle Conquest (1964)
46. Conquest Overboard (1964)
47. Calamity Conquest (1965)
48. Conquest Likes It Hot (1965)
49. Curtains for Conquest? (1966)
50. Conquest Calls the Tune (1968)
51. Conquest in Ireland (1969)

=== The "Ironsides" Cromwell Novels (writing as Victor Gunn) ===
1. Footsteps of Death (1939)
2. Ironsides of the Yard (1940)
3. Ironsides Smashes Through (1940)
4. Death's Doorway (1941)
5. Ironsides' Lone Hand (1941)
6. Mad Hatter's Rock (1942)
7. Ironsides Sees Red (1943)
8. The Dead Man Laughs (1944)
9. Nice Day for a Murder (1945)
10. Ironsides Smells Blood (1946)
11. Death On Shivering Sand (1947)
12. Three Dates with Death (1947)
13. Ironsides On the Spot (1948)
14. Dead Man's Warning (1949)
15. Road to Murder (1949)
16. Alias the Hangman (1950)
17. The Borgia Head Mystery (1951)
18. Murder On Ice (1951)
19. The Body Vanishes (1952)
20. Death Comes Laughing (1952)
21. The Whistling Key (1953)
22. The Crippled Canary (1954)
23. The Crooked Staircase (1954)
24. The Laughing Grave (1955)
25. The Painted Dog (1955)
26. Dead Men's Bells (1956)
27. Castle Dangerous (1957)
28. The Golden Monkey (1957)
29. The 64 Thousand Murder (1958)
30. The Treble Chance Murder (1958)
31. Dead in a Ditch (1959)
32. The Next One to Die (1959)
33. Death at Traitors' Gate (1960)
34. Death On Bodmin Moor (1960)
35. Devil in the Maze (1961)
36. Sweet Smelling Death (1961)
37. All Change for Murder (1962)
38. The Body in the Boot (1963)
39. Murder with a Kiss (1963)
40. Murder At the Motel (1964)
41. The Black Cap Murder (1965)
42. Murder on Whispering Sands (1965)
43. The Petticoat Lane Murders (1966)

== Selected bibliography ==
- The Rotter of Whitelands (under pseud. Reginald Browne). Published by: London, Gerald G. Swan, 1947
- Fortescue of the Fourth (under pseud. Reginald Browne).
- The School in Space (under pseud. Reginald Browne).
