= Francis Addington Symonds =

British adventure and mystery author (1893–1971)

- Born: 1893; Southampton, Hampshire, England
- Died: 1971 (aged 77–78)
- Occupations: Editor, writer
- Writing career
- Pen name: Earle Danesford, F. Addington Symonds
- Period: 1921–1962
- Genre: Detective fiction

Francis Addington Symonds (1893–1971) was a British editor and writer who wrote under the pen-names Earle Danesford, 'Howard Steele and F. A. Symonds. He was Founder-Editor of The Champion in 1922, and he later edited Rocket, Pluck, and Young Britain. He also wrote several Sexton Blake stories for the Union Jack and The Sexton Blake Library.

== Life ==
In 1921 he wrote his first Sexton Blake story. The story proved popular and he continued to write Blake tales throughout the 1920s, adding unique characters to the saga including Claire Delisle, The Raven, Dr. Queed, and Vedax the Dwarf.

In the late 1920s and early 1930s he published articles and short stories under the pen-name Earle Danesford, a name he subsequently used for stories featuring detective Gable Keen. With Alfred Edgar, and under the name of 'Howard Steele', he resurrected Panther Grayle, a detective created by Jack Lancaster for the Empire Library in 1910. The character was assisted by a reformed 17-year-old delinquent named Dusty.

After World War II he published several non-fiction works, mostly of the teach-yourself-a-skill variety.

His most popular detective work was Murder of Me (1946), the account of a murder told from the victim's perspective. The description on the back read:

"In any case of murder only two people can possibly know the whole truth – the murderer and his victim. The former keeps his secret, and dead men tell no tales – But do they? Here is one who, though dead, yet breaks the silence and in his post-mortem autobiography guides his daughter in her quest for the identity of his murderer." – "This is a story of death, written by the dead – can you solve the mystery?"

Smile and Murder (1954) was equally well received. The description on the back read:

"Who did not kill Clare Hale? The question, like this novel, is a variation of the old theme of "whodunit" and Julian Drew, who came to know everything provides the answer–or does he? Urbane and cynical, the seemingly detached spectator of all that goes on in Overton Lodge, he describes each incident leading up to the exciting climax. Then Detective Inspector Charles Heriot takes over and suggests a different and even more surprising answer. Both are right–and wrong. Neither probes the ultimate secret... If you are a hardened crime-story fan, you may feel, as you follow the twists and turns of the story, that you are at least one jump ahead of the author. But it doesn't do to be sure."

He published his last series, a three-part saga featuring Superintendent Maxwell Quayne, in the early 1960s.

== List of Works ==
=== Sexton Blake Stories ===
- The Golden Casket (1921)
- The Iron Claw (1921)
- The Valley of Fear (1921)
- The Raven's Prey (1921)
- The Case of the Chinese Hypnotist (1921)
- The Affair of the Exiled Princess (1921)
- The Raven and the Ruby (1921)
- The Grey Parrot (1921)
- The Case of the Twisted Trail (1922)
- The Red Dwarf (1922)
- By Order of the Soviet (1925)
- The Case of the Golden Stool (1925)
- Out of the Fog (1926)
- The Case of the Hold Up-King (1927)
- The Man from Australia (1928)

=== Sexton Blake Collections ===
The Claire Delisle Files (2022)

=== Gable Keen Series ===
- Words and Music (1930)
- The Riddle of the Phantom Crime (1930)
- A Chinese Puzzle (1930)
- A Trip to Mars (1930)
- The Riddle of the Hat (1930)
- The Mystery of the Black Shapes (1930)
- The Deductions of Gable Keen (1931)
- Get-His-Man Keen (1931)

=== Superintendent Maxwell Quayne ===
- Stone Dead (1961)
- Death Goes Window Shopping (1961)
- Spotlight on Murder (1962)

== Other Novels ==
- Aftermaths (1924)
- Oil of Cloves (1924)
- Prerogative of Mercy (1925)
- Backwoods Treasure (1925)
- Broken Trails (1926)
- Foes of the Footlights (1926)
- The Treasure Trap (1926)
- Nine Hours More (1926)
- Broken Trails (1926)
- The Brother of Sleep (1927)
- Ghost Island (1928)
- The Rolling Stone (1930)
- The Nightmare Planet (1930)
- The Secret of the Swamp Country (1936)
- The House of Riddles (1939)
- Murder of Me (1946)
- Portrait of the Accused (1954)
- Smile and Murder (1954)

=== Non-fiction ===
- Teach Yourself Shorthand : an exposition of the Gregg system for self-tuition (1943)
- Teach Yourself Personal Efficiency (1949)
- Teach Yourself Commercial Correspondence (1949)
- The Johannesburg Story (1953)
- Christianity in Action : Real Life Stories of Ordinary People Who Have Demonstrated the Power of Christian Faith in Practice (1955)
- John Robert Gregg, the Man and His Work (1963)
