= Halfpenny Marvel =

UK magazine (1893–1922)

- Cover 'Halfpenny Marvel #74 from 1895
- Editor: Harold J. Garrish
- Categories: Story paper
- Frequency: Weekly
- First issue: 1893; 133 years ago
- Final issue: 1922
- Company: Amalgamated Press
- Country: United Kingdom
- Based in: London
- Language: English

The Marvel, originally known as the Halfpenny Marvel, was the first British boys' story paper launched by Alfred Harmsworth, the founder of the Amalgamated Press. The publication was conceived with the intention of countering the influence of "penny dreadfuls"—sensational and often violent literature for young readers. Its aim was to produce "pure, healthy literature" at a cheaper price, and the slogan "Started to Suppress Bad Books for Boys" appeared on its cover for many years, underscoring its mission.

The Halfpenny Marvel made its debut on 15 November 1893 and sold for a halfpenny until 23 January 1904, a run of 533 issues. The price was raised to a penny on 30 January 1904 and ran until 22 April 1922, a run of 952 issues.

== Early years and content ==
The Halfpenny Marvel debuted with No. 1, titled "Dead Man's Land," written by S. Clarke Hook, a prolific contributor throughout the publication’s history. Other early stories included "The Gold Fiend" (No. 2), "The Black Pirate" (No. 4), and "The Witches' Clutch" (No. 17). Despite its moralistic intent, the paper still featured thrilling and adventurous tales similar to those found in the very publications it sought to replace.

One of the Marvel’s most significant contributions to popular fiction was the introduction of the character Sexton Blake. Contrary to popular belief, Blake did not first appear in the Union Jack, but rather in the Marvel’s No. 6, "The Missing Millionaire," written by Harry Blyth under the pseudonym Hal Meredeth. A sequel, "A Christmas Crime," followed the next week.

== Writers, editors, and illustrators ==
The first editor of the Marvel was Harold J. Garrish, who also wrote stories under multiple pen names. Other notable authors included Herbert Maxwell, John G. Rowe, Henry St. John, Paul Herring, A. S. Hardy, and Reginald Wray. Illustrators contributing to the paper included G.M. Dodshon, T.W. Holmes, H.M. Lewis, Tom Browne, and W.M. Bowles.

For a brief period, the paper experimented with condensed versions of classic literature by authors such as Sir Walter Scott, Charles Dickens, Harrison Ainsworth, and Henry Cockton. However, this initiative was short-lived, as it failed to resonate with the readership.

== Jack, Sam, and Pete stories ==
Towards the later years of its halfpenny era, the Marvel gained popularity through a recurring trio of characters—Jack, Sam, and Pete. The first of these stories, "The Eagle of Death" (No. 385), was followed by "The Death Sentence". Written primarily by S. Clarke Hook, these characters became the backbone of the publication for decades. R.J. Macdonald illustrated many of these stories, continuing his work for over fifty years.

== Transition to Penny Marvel ==
In January 1904, the paper was rebranded as the Marvel and its price increased to one penny. The first issue of this new era appeared on January 27, featuring 32 pages in its signature green cover. The format generally included two long, complete stories and a serial, a structure that remained consistent for most of its run. The Jack, Sam, and Pete stories remained a staple, alongside detective and adventure tales.

During this period, Arthur S. Hardy introduced stories of Tom Sayers, a character named after the historical bare-knuckle boxer. Hardy’s tales of Sayers’ rise from a waif to middleweight champion gained popularity, often featuring thrilling fight descriptions and theatrical settings.

J. Abney Cummings illustrated Jack, Sam, and Pete until his death late in the paper’s run. Some readers criticized Clarke Hook’s later stories, claiming they had devolved into formulaic slapstick, but the characters' enduring popularity ensured their continued presence.

== Later years and decline ==
After World War I, the paper began to wane. New storylines included school tales by Sidney Drew and sports fiction, such as football stories by Randolph Ryle (a pen name of John Nix Pentelow) and boxing tales featuring Kit Strong. A significant design change occurred when the traditional green cover was replaced with a white background and red-and-blue text.

In April 1922, the Marvel ceased publication, though its ending was framed as a title change rather than a closure. It was rebranded as Sport and Adventure, but this successor lasted only 26 issues before being discontinued. Despite its unceremonious ending, the Marvel had achieved a respectable 28-year run, its 1,485 issues leaving a lasting impact on British boys' fiction and serialized storytelling.
