= Sexton Blake bibliography =

List of cases featuring fictional British detective Sexton Blake

Sexton Blake bibliography 1893–1911
- The Sexton Blake Catalogue 1966
- Author: Harry Blyth (Creator); William Murray Graydon; Cecil Hayter; Norman Goddard; Michael Storm; John William Staniforth
- Country: United Kingdom
- Language: English
- Genre: Detective fiction
- Publisher: Amalgamated Press
- Media type: Story paper

Sexton Blake is a fictional detective who has been featured in many British comic strips, novels, and dramatic productions since 1893. He was featured in various British publications from 1893 to 1978 in a variety of formats: single-issue adventures, short stories, serials, and comic strips. In total, Blake appeared in more than 4,000 stories by over 200 different authors. During its golden age (1920s–1940s), Blake's adventures were widely read and translated into at least twenty different languages, including Swedish, Norwegian, Finnish, Dutch, Spanish, German, Portuguese, Italian, French, Arabic, Hindi, and Afrikaans.

== Publication history ==
The first Sexton Blake story was "The Missing Millionaire". Written by Harry Blyth (using the pseudonym Hal Meredeth), it was published in The Halfpenny Marvel number 6, on 20 December 1893, a story paper owned by the Amalgamated Press. Blyth wrote six more Sexton Blake tales, three for the Marvel and three for The Union Jack a story paper launched in April 1894.

The Amalgamated Press purchased the copyright to Blake along with the first story Blyth had submitted and from 1895 onwards several authors began to pen Blake tales. From August 1905 Blake became the resident character in The Union Jack, appearing in every issue until its transformation into the Detective Weekly in 1933.

Blake's popularity began to grow during the Edwardian era, and he appeared in a number of different story papers. These appearances included serials in the tabloid sized Boys' Friend, complete tales in the pocket-sized Penny Pictorial, and short stores in Answers, one of the Amalgamated Press' most popular papers. Longer tales of 60,000 words or so appeared in The Boys' Friend Library and the success of these led to the creation of The Sexton Blake Library in 1915. This digest-sized publication specialized in longer tales, and at the height of its popularity was published 5 times a month.It ran for just under 50 years.

In 1959 Fleetway Publications acquired the rights to Sexton Blake adventures and published The Sexton Blake Library until the title's demise. The final tale, The Last Tiger, was published in June 1963.

In 1965, Blake editor William Howard Baker licensed the rights of the Sexton Blake character. He published the fifth series of The Sexton Blake Library independently via Mayflower-Dell Books, which ran until 1968. He then issued a final series of four Sexton Blake novels, using his Howard Baker Books imprint, in 1969. From 1968 to 1971 Valiant published new comic strips in the style of the Knockout strips from decades earlier. Blake's last original appearance was in Sexton Blake and the Demon God "a period thriller with ancient curses and cliff-hanger endings" in 1978.

There were a few anthologies and reprints in the 80s and 90s. In 2009 Wordsworth Books published the casebook of Sexton Blake and Snowbooks published Sexton Blake Detective. 2018 saw an uptick in Sexton Blake reprints, with the first print novels published by Stillwoods Publishing, a Canadian publisher out of Nova Scotia. In 2020 ROH Press began publishing Sexton Blake tales with Sexton Blake The Early Years, a collection of Blake's first cases. British publishers Rebellion Publishing produced four anthologies in 2020–21, each introduced by Blakeologist Mark Hodder.

== Compiling the Sexton Blake bibliography ==
The bibliography originated in the pages of Story Paper Collectors' Digest where collectors began recording and compiling the list of Blake tales that appeared in The Union Jack and The Sexton Blake Library. A master corpus was assembled in the late 1950s by The Sexton Blake Circle to facilitate the research of the Blake story papers.

Titles and authorship were verified from the archived records of the Amalgamated Press. As many of authors published in The Union Jack before 1929 were uncredited, the Sexton Blake Circle adopted the practice of accrediting authorship to the person who received payment for the tale until proven otherwise. Led by Len and Josie Packman expansion and revision on the master corpus was ongoing throughout the early 1960s as research brought more titles to light.

The Sexton Blake Catalogue was published in 1966. The announcement in Story Paper Collectors' Digest read:

This long anticipated catalogue, prepared with loving care by members of the Sexton Blake Circle, is now awaiting you. It is a veritable encyclopaedia of Sexton Blake lore, listing all the titles, authors, and leading characters of the stories in The Union Jack and in The Sexton Blake Library from the very beginning till the present day. There is also a wealth of information on the Sexton Blake adventures which featured in other periodicals. Beautifully produced, it sums up to a magnificent job.

In 1970 Josie Packman announced a reprint of the Sexton Blake Catalogue along with a "supplement of all the new information."

In July 1971 its completion and availability was announced in the Collector's Digest with the following announcement:

FOR ALL SEXTON BLAKE FANS
The Supplement to the Sexton Blake Catalogue is now ready, containing all the information which was not to hand at the time the main Catalogue was first published. It contains all the titles in the most recent series of the Sexton Blake Library; information concerning all the Blake serials of years gone by; particulars of Blake as seen in stage plays and on the talking screen; titles of Blake stories in the rare Penny Pictorial and in Answers Library, plus information concerning the pre-war Sexton Blake Annuals.

Since publication the Catalogue and supplement have been considered an "invaluable" tool by researchers interested in the Blake canon. As Blake research was ongoing as new information or titles were discovered in primary sources, the catalogue was updated.

The catalogue provided verification that Sexton Blake had appeared in roughly 4000 tales by around 200 authors. Based on this statistic, Otto Penzler and Chris Steinbrunner writing in the Encyclopedia of Mystery and Detection, concluded that Sexton Blake was "the hero of more novels and stories than any other detective."

In 1993 the second edition of the "famous Sexton Blake Catalogue" was announced in honour of the detective's 100th birthday. The announcement read:

With over 120 pages of text and illustrations listing all the known appearances of the world's greatest detective in print, TV, radio and celluloid, this bibliography is a must for all collectors.

It was issued by The Sexton Blake Library of the London Old Boys' Book Club.

Additions to the catalogue since 1993 have been made from publisher and retailer websites. ISBN numbers, where applicable, have been added to assist verification.

== The Sexton Blake bibliography parts 1 to 4 ==
Due to the extreme length of the bibliography it has been divided into four eras:

1893–1911: The Victorian/Edwardian Era Sexton Blake bibliography
1912–1945: The Master Criminals Era Sexton Blake bibliography part 2: 1912–1945
1946–1978: The Post War Era Sexton Blake bibliography part 3: 1946–1978
1979–present: Revivals and Republications: Sexton Blake bibliography part 4: 1979–present

== Notes to the cases ==
All authors have been listed and linked to their Wikipedia biographies where possible. Many of these authors are remembered nowadays for the adversaries they pitted against Blake or the femme fatales they introduced. Many of these popular characters and their appearances have been described and included as well as key incidents in the life of Sexton Blake.

== 1893 Amalgamated Press era begins ==
Sexton Blake's career began on 13 December 1893, the same month that Sherlock Holmes appeared in "The Final Problem". Blake was one of many detectives created in the 1890s to fill the void created by the tale Sir Arthur Conan Doyle intended to be the final Holmes story.

Publication	Title	Format	Author	Key Characters	Notes
Halfpenny Marvel 6	The Missing Millionaire	Complete Story	Hal Meredeth (Harry Blyth)	Detective Jules Gervaise	Sexton Blake's debut adventure. By the end of the tale he partners with French detective Jules Gervaise. Gervaise was a tribute to the popular French detectives created by writer Émile Gaboriau. During that era it was considered an honour for an up-and-coming detective to work with a French "mentor." Blake fights against The Red Lights of London and puts an end to the machinations of Madame Dulk.
Halfpenny Marvel 7	A Christmas Crime	Continuation of previous tale	Hal Meredeth (Harry Blyth)		Blake's second case and he is smitten with the heroine Lillie Ray – the first but not the last time he falls for a woman connected to a case.

== 1894 ==
Publication	Title	Format	Author	Key Characters	Notes
Illustrated Chips 225–226	The Lamp of Death	Serial. Part 1 & 2	Patrick Morris (W. De Montmorency)	Muriel Lane	The first Sexton Blake serial. Sexton Blake meets Muriel Lane a woman who would eventually become his wife.
Halfpenny Marvel 11	A Golden Ghost; or, Tracked by a Phantom	Complete tale	Harry Blyth		Blake is solo on this case.
Halfpenny Marvel 33	Sexton Blake's Peril!	Complete tale	Hal Meredeth (Harry Blyth)		Blake fights The Terrible Three.
The Union Jack (1st Series) 2	Sexton Blake; Detective	Complete tale	Harry Blyth		Sexton Blake debuts in the story paper that will make him famous. The editor markets Blake as a real person. There is no sign of Jules Gervaise.
The Union Jack (1st Series) 15	Sexton Blake's Triumph!	Complete tale	Hal Meredith (Harry Blyth)		Blake matches wits with a villain known as The Slaughterer.

== 1895 ==
Publication	Title	Format	Author	Key Characters	Notes
Illustrated Chips 227–245	The Lamp of Death	(Serial. Parts 3 to 21)	Patrick Morris (W. De Montmorency)		The completion of the first Sexton Blake serial.
Pluck 56	Christmas Clues		Anon (Harry Blyth & Maxwell Scott (John William Staniforth))	Detective Nelson Lee; Detective Gideon Barr	A team up of sorts. Sexton Blake spends Christmas (well Boxing Day actually) with two rival detectives: Nelson Lee (created by Maxwell Scott) and Gideon Barr (created by Harry Blyth). The three are great friends, the latter two detectives having made their debut in 1894. Gideon Barr faded into obscurity after five tales. Nelson Lee rivalled Blake in popularity and was perhaps even more popular than Blake during the Victorian era.
The Union Jack (1st Series) 43	Tracked Around the World		Sexton Blake (W. De Montmorency)		Blake fights a spy named Nightsdale, who has stolen valuable government documents. His lodgings are in Shepherd's Bush.
The Union Jack (1st Series) 58	The Marcel Mystery		William Shaw Rae		Blake deals with rival lovers.
The Union Jack (1st Series) 62	A Clue from the Deep		Sexton Blake (William Shaw Rae)		A message in a bottle leads to many a chase. Sexton Blake lives in Norfolk Street, the Strand.
The Union Jack (1st Series) 65	Sexton Blake's Stratagem		William Shaw Rae		Blake's valet is an ex-constable named Kennedy.
The Union Jack (1st Series) 69	Nalda the Nihilist; or, Sexton Blake in Russia		Anon. (W. J. Lomax)		Sexton Blake has a maid named Sarah Ann. His chambers are on Norfolk Street, Strand. This is the first tale told in the first person where Sexton Blake is the narrator.
The Union Jack (1st Series) 72	The Clue of the Dead Eyes		Arnold Grahame		
The Union Jack (1st Series) 75	Tracked to the Death Valley		Melton Whyte (G. Anderson)		
The Union Jack (1st Series) 82	Doctor Zebra's Doom		Herbert Maxwell (W. J. Lomax)		Blake matches wits with Doctor Zebra, an occultist, mesmerist and practitioner of the "Eastern Arts".
The Union Jack (1st Series) 88	The Living Picture		Anon. (William Shaw Rae)		

== 1896 ==
Publication	Title	Format	Author	Key Characters	Notes
The Union Jack (1st Series) 102–118	Shadowed and Haunted	Serial. Parts 1–17	Anon. (Unknown)		Sexton Blake investigates the murder of a forensic scientist.
The Union Jack (1st Series) 125	How Sexton Blake Won His Spurs		William Shaw Rae		The tale relates how Sexton Blake solved his first case back in 1878.
The Union Jack (1st Series) 138	Bravo, Blake!		William Shaw Rae		Bravo Blake was the nickname given to Blake while he studied at the Public School of Ashleigh.

== 1897 ==
Publication	Title	Format	Author	Key Characters	Notes
The Union Jack (1st Series) 147	Chased Through China		William Shaw Rae	Notable character debut: We-wee	This tale introduces We-wee, Blakes first boy assistant. Blake meets him in China while on an adventure. We-wee is an orphan and readily agrees to accompany Blake back to England. In many ways the We-wee tales foreshadow the adventures of Blake and Tinker. We-wee is a key figure in the 1890s' renaissance of the child detective.
The Union Jack (1st Series) 149	Death By Misadventure		Anon. (William Stanhope Sprigg)		
The Union Jack (1st Series) 155	From Clue to Capture		William Shaw Rae	A We-wee tale	
The Union Jack (1st Series) 162	For the Shah		William Shaw Rae	A We-wee tale	
The Union Jack (1st Series) 168	Sexton Blake Among the Moors		William Shaw Rae	A We-wee tale	
The Union Jack (1st Series) 172	Dead Man's Hand		Melton Whyte (G. Anderson)		
The Union Jack (1st Series) 180	The Finger Clue		William Shaw Rae	A We-wee tale	
The Union Jack (1st Series) 186	Under the Smuggler's Flag		William Shaw Rae	A We-wee tale	
The Union Jack (1st Series) 191	A Christmas Clue		Anon. (Unknown)		Blake lives on Arundel Street, Strand and has an assistant named Watson.

== 1898 ==
Publication	Title	Format	Author	Key Characters	Notes
The Union Jack (1st Series) 194	'Twixt Gallows and Gold		Anon. (Harry Blyth)		The last tale by Blake creator Harry Blyth. Blyth died of typhoid fever in February 1898, aged only 46.
The Union Jack (1st Series) 204	The Truman Mystery		William Shaw Rae	A We-wee tale	
The Union Jack (1st Series) 208	The Phantom Photographer		William Shaw Rae	A We-wee tale	
The Union Jack (1st Series) 220	The Dagger of Dunloe		William Shaw Rae	A We-wee tale	
The Union Jack (1st Series) 228	The Third Man		William Shaw Rae	A We-wee tale	
The Union Jack (1st Series) 238	The Mystery Man		William Shaw Rae	A We-wee tale	
The Union Jack (1st Series) 245	The Cigarette Clue		William Shaw Rae	A We-wee tale	

== 1899 ==
Publication	Title	Format	Author	Key Characters	Notes
The Union Jack (1st Series) 250	The Ghost of Strandgap Priory		William Shaw Rae	A We-wee tale	
The Union Jack (1st Series) 261	The Lancer Lad		William Shaw Rae		
The Union Jack (1st Series) 283	Shadowed by Sexton Blake		C. Stevens (Julian Rochfort)		
The Union Jack (1st Series) 285	The Hermit of Texas		Campbell Brown (G. W. Brown)		
The Union Jack (1st Series) 289	The Secret Hand		William Shaw Rae	A We-wee tale	
The Union Jack (1st Series) 292	Val Hilton's Vow		Anon. (Unknown)		

== 1900 ==
Publication	Title	Format	Author	Key Characters	Notes
The Union Jack (1st Series) 299	The Brand of Sin		William Shaw Rae	A We-wee tale.	
The Union Jack (1st Series) 336	The Parachute King		Paul Herring		
The Union Jack (1st Series) 344	The Ghost of Smuggler's Rock		G. W. Brown		

== 1901 ==
Publication	Title	Format	Author	Key Characters	Notes
The Marvel Library 421–425	Book I: The Real Adventures of Sexton Blake	Serial. (Part 1–5)	Anon. (Percy C. Bishop)		Blake battles Professor Septimus Murgatroyd and the Ology Club – a sinister league of scientists.
The Union Jack (1st Series) 356–369	Griff the Man Tracker	Serial. (Part 1–14)	C. Stevens (Julian Rochfort)	Notable character debut: Griff the Man Tracker	Griff is perhaps one of the strangest of all the Sexton Blake sidekicks.
The Union Jack (1st Series) 370		(1) Certain to Win (2) Griff the Man Tracker (part 15)	(1) Norman Goddard (2) C. Stevens (Julian Rochfort)		
The Union Jack (1st Series) 371–373	Griff the Man Tracker	Serial. (Part 16–18)	C. Stevens (Julian Rochfort)		
The Union Jack (1st Series) 375	Fortune Stone		William Shaw Rae	We-wee	We-wee's final appearance.
The Union Jack (1st Series) 396	Sexton Blake's Lost Clue		P. Cooke (Percy C. Bishop)	Notable character debut: Wallace Lorrimer.	Lorrimer is Blake's secretary and pupil, and will play a prominent role in The Real Adventures of Sexton Blake serial.
The Union Jack (1st Series) 400	10,000 Reward		J. H. Thompson		

== 1902 ==
Publication	Title	Format	Author	Key Characters	Notes
The Marvel Library 426–466	Book I: The Real Adventures of Sexton Blake	Serial. (Part 6–46)	Anon. (Percy C. Bishop)	Wallace Lorrimer	Blake and Lorrimer battle against Professor Murgatroyd and the Ology Club continues.
The Marvel Library 467–477	Book II: King of Detectives	Serial. (Part 1–11)	Anon. (Percy C. Bishop)	Wallace Lorrimer	Blake and Lorrimer solve a jewel robbery and a murder.
The Union Jack (1st Series) 411	Tracked Across the Sea		A. G. Pearson	Detective Maxwell Grey	Blake teams up with Maxwell Grey, the Sea Detective. Pearson "was reputed to be an ex-Naval man" and the detail he provides is quite authentic. Grey also appeared in his own story, The Sea Detective, in Union Jack 455.
The Union Jack (1st Series) 420	The Clue of the Freckled Hand		Paul Herring		
The Union Jack (1st Series) 426	Enemies of the King		A. G. Pearson	Detective Maxwell Grey	Blake teams up with Maxwell Grey for the second time.
The Union Jack (1st Series) 450	The Convict Hunt		Paul Herring		

== 1903 ==
Publication	Title	Format	Author	Key Characters	Notes
The Marvel Library 478–501	Book II: King of Detectives	Serial. (Part 12-35)	Anon. (Percy C. Bishop)	Wallace Lorrimer	
The Union Jack (1st Series) 464	Sexton Blake's Clue	Short story	Anon. (Unknown)		

== 1904 ==
This year marks the beginning of what will become the Blake crime-fighting trio: Sexton Blake, his assistant Tinker and their bloodhound Pedro. Tinker makes his first appearance in 1904, Pedro follows just under a year later in 1905.

Publication	Title	Author	Key Characters	Notes
The Union Jack (2nd Series) 51	Sexton Blake's Triumph	Arnold Davis (A. G. Pearson)		
The Union Jack (2nd Series) 53	Cunning Against Skill	Anon. (W. J. Lomax)	Notable character debut: Tinker	Tinker is Sexton Blake's loyal assistant, an orphaned teenage boy that Blake has taken under his wing.
The Union Jack (2nd Series) 59	The Mark of the Thumb	Anon. (T. D. Maitland)		
The Union Jack (2nd Series) 62	The Mystery of Hilton Royal	Arnold Davis (William M. Graydon)		Sexton Blake has moved to Baker Street.

== 1905 ==
As can be seen by the title of these stories the early Edwardian phase of Blake's career consists of tales where he goes undercover in various jobs or travels overseas.

Publication	Title	Format	Author	Key Characters	Notes
The Boys' Friend 230–235	The Schoolmaster Detective	Serial Part 1–6)	Herbert Maxwell (W. J. Lomax)		
The Boys' Friend 236	Sexton Blake on the Railway	Serial (Part 1) Plus: The Schoolmaster Detective (part 7)	Herbert Maxwell (W. J. Lomax)		
The Boys' Friend 237	Sexton Blake on the Railway	Serial (Part 2)	Herbert Maxwell (W. J. Lomax)		
The Boys' Friend 238	Sexton Blake on the Railway	Serial (Part 3)	Herbert Maxwell (W. J. Lomax)		
The Jester and Wonder 174–193	Sexton Blake, The Clique of Death	Serial (Parts 1–20)	Maxwell Scott (John William Staniforth)	La Mascotte; The Ring of Death	Set in 1889, this serial tells of the case that made Sexton Blake famous. Blake matches wits with The Ring of Death, a powerful criminal organisation. Notable among its members is La Mascotte, arguably the deadliest of all of Blake's female foes to date. Blake lives in Fitzalan square and is assisted by Army Reserve man, an Irishman named Sergeant O'Flaherty. It is the only detective serial Maxwell Scott ever wrote where he did not create the main character.
The Jester and Wonder 216	The Detective Club: Teddy Quicksilver	Short Story	Anon. (Unknown)		The Detective Club was a series of tales that featured the most popular detectives in the boys story papers. The detectives gathered at the 'tec club each Friday night and would listen to one of their members tell the story of a case they had worked on.
The Union Jack (2nd Series) 68	Trapped By Sexton Blake		Arnold Davis (William M. Graydon)		
The Union Jack (2nd Series) 69	Sexton Blake's First Case		Anon. (William Stanhope Sprigg)		Sexton Blake, then an 18-year-old clerk in a law office, solves his first case. At the end of the case, Blake opens a business, Blake & Co. with offices in St. Martin's Lane.
The Union Jack (2nd Series) 71	The Clue of Three		Anon. (E. J. Gannon)		
The Union Jack (2nd Series) 73	From Clue to Climax		Anon. (William Murray Graydon)	Lord Berkeley Carfax	
The Union Jack (2nd Series) 77	On the Track		Anon. (T. D. Maitland)		
The Union Jack (2nd Series) 79	Secrets of a Great City		Anon. (A. G. Pearson)	Jimmy Sykes	Jimmy Sykes is another boy assistant.
The Union Jack (2nd Series) 81	The Ocean Detective		Anon. (E. A. Treeton)		
The Union Jack (2nd Series) 83	The Tsar's Double		Anon. (Norman Goddard)		
The Union Jack (2nd Series) 85	The Jungle Boy		Anon. (William Murray Graydon)		
The Union Jack (2nd Series) 87	Foes in the Dark		Anon. (William Murray Graydon)		
The Union Jack (2nd Series) 89	Two on a Trail		Mark Darran (Norman Goddard)		
The Union Jack (2nd Series) 91	The Warder Detective		Anon. (E. A. Treeton)		
The Union Jack (2nd Series) 93	The Army Detective		Anon. (A. G. Pearson)		
The Union Jack (2nd Series) 95	Detective and Fakir		Arnold Davis (A. G. Pearson)		
The Union Jack (2nd Series) 96	Champion of the Channel		Anon. (A. S. Hardy)		
The Union Jack (2nd Series) 97	The House of Mystery		Anon. (William Murray Graydon)	Notable character debut Mrs. Bardell	Mrs. Bardell is Sexton Blake's landlady.
The Union Jack (2nd Series) 98	The Railway Detective		Anon. (W. B. Home-Gall)		
The Union Jack (2nd Series) 99	Tracked Across Europe		Anon. (Edgar Pickering)		
The Union Jack (2nd Series) 100	The Dog Detective		Anon. (William Murray Graydon)	Notable character debut Pedro	Pedro, Blake's faithful bloodhound makes his first appearance.
The Union Jack (2nd Series) 101	Sexton Blake in China		Anon. (Norman Goddard)		A story of modern slave trading
The Union Jack (2nd Series) 102	The Navy Detective		Anon. (A. G. Pearson)		
The Union Jack (2nd Series) 103	The Fireman Detective		Anon. (William Murray Graydon)		
The Union Jack (2nd Series) 104	Twice Round the World		Anon. (E. A. Treeton)		
The Union Jack (2nd Series) 105	Sexton Blake P.C.		Anon. (Norman Goddard)	Notable character debut Detective Will Spearing	Detective Will Spearing will become a close Blake ally and eventually appears in his own tales.
The Union Jack (2nd Series) 107	The Cab Driver Detective		Anon. (W. B. Home-Gall)		From issue 107 onward, Sexton Blake will appear in every issue of The Union Jack.
The Union Jack (2nd Series) 108	Sexton Blake's Coup		Anon. (Norman Goddard)		
The Union Jack (2nd Series) 109	The Mechanic Detective		Anon. (Edgar Pickering)		
The Union Jack (2nd Series) 110	The Jockey Detective		Anon. (E. J. Gannon)		
The Union Jack (2nd Series) 111	The Actor Detective		Anon. (F. H. Evans)		
The Union Jack (2nd Series) 112	Sexton Blake in Africa		Anon. (William Murray Graydon)	Matthew Quin, 'Wild Beast Agent'	
The Union Jack (2nd Series) 113	The Post Office Detective		Anon. (A. G. Pearson)		Sexton Blake goes undercover as a sorter and a postman. Tinker assumes the part of a telegraph boy.
The Union Jack (2nd Series) 114	Sexton Blake's X'mas		Anon. (Norman Goddard)		Sexton Blake, Tinker and Pedro celebrate their first Christmas together. A Double Christmas issue that takes place in Siberia.
The Union Jack (2nd Series) 115	In Double Disguise		Anon. (William Murray Graydon)		
The Union Jack (2nd Series) 116	The River Police Detective		Anon. (Norman Goddard)		

== 1906 ==
Publication	Title	Format	Author	Key Characters	Notes
The Boys' Friend 239–251	Sexton Blake on the Railway	Serial. Part 4-16	Herbert Maxwell (W. J. Lomax)		
The Boys' Friend 252–268	Sexton Blake in America	Serial. Part 1–17	Herbert Maxwell (W. J. Lomax)		
The Boys' Realm 219	The Case of the Opium Smoker		Anon. (William Murray Graydon)		
The Boys' Realm 220	The Case of the Two Leopards		Anon. (William Murray Graydon)		
The Boys' Realm 221	The Case of Lord Avenmore's Plate		Anon. (William Murray Graydon)		
The Boys' Realm 222	The Case of Lord Armadale's Burglar		Anon. (William Murray Graydon)		
The Boys' Realm 223	The Case of the German Prince		Anon. (William Murray Graydon)		
The Boys' Realm 224	The Case of the City Office-Boy		Anon. (William Murray Graydon)		
The Boys' Realm 225	The Case of the Railway-Manager's Son		Anon. (William Murray Graydon)		
The Boys' Realm 226	The Case of the Eastwich Mail-Cart		Anon. (William Murray Graydon)		
The Boys' Realm 227	His Lordship's Valet		Anon. (William Murray Graydon)		
The Boys' Realm 228	The Missing Huntsman		Anon. (William Murray Graydon)		
The Boys' Realm 229	The Case of the Young Secretary		Anon. (William Murray Graydon)		
The Boys' Realm 230	The Footman From France		Anon. (William Murray Graydon)		
The Boys' Realm 231	The Obstinate Witness		Anon. (William Murray Graydon)		
The Jester and Wonder 222	The Detective Club: A Trail of Glittering Gold		Anon. (Unknown)		
The Jester and Wonder 232	The Detective Club: The Scourge of the Bush		Anon. (Unknown)		
The Marvel 133	On Special Service		Paul Herring		
The Union Jack (2nd Series) 117	The Reporter Detective		Anon. (E. A. Treeton)		
The Union Jack (2nd Series) 118	The Lost Chief		Anon. (William Murray Graydon)		
The Union Jack (2nd Series) 119	Sexton Blake in Australia		Anon. (T. C. Bridges)		
The Union Jack (2nd Series) 120	Sexton Blake, Beefeater		Anon. (W. J. Lomax)		
The Union Jack (2nd Series) 121	Sexton Blake, Gamekeeper		Anon. (W. B. Home-Gall)		
The Union Jack (2nd Series) 122	Underground London		Anon. (Norman Goddard)		
The Union Jack (2nd Series) 123	Sexton Blake – Convict		Anon. (E. W. Alais)		
The Union Jack (2nd Series) 124	The Diver Detective		Anon. (A. G. Pearson)		
The Union Jack (2nd Series) 125	Tinker, Limited.		Anon. (Norman Goddard)	Detective-Inspector Spearing	
The Union Jack (2nd Series) 126	The Thumb-Print Clue		Anon. (William Murray Graydon)		
The Union Jack (2nd Series) 127	The Motor Detective		Anon. (Edgar Pickering)		
The Union Jack (2nd Series) 128	The Lost Seal		Anon. (William Murray Graydon)		
The Union Jack (2nd Series) 129	The Disguise Detective		Anon. (Norman Goddard)		
The Union Jack (2nd Series) 130	The Circus Detective		Anon. (Cicely Hamilton)		Cicely Hamilton holds the distinction of being the first female writer to pen Sexton Blake tales.
The Union Jack (2nd Series) 131	The Tram-Ticket Clue		Anon. (William Murray Graydon)		
The Union Jack (2nd Series) 132	No Clue		Anon. (W. J. Lomax)		
The Union Jack (2nd Series) 133	Sexton Blake, Aeronaut		Anon. (William Murray Graydon)		
The Union Jack (2nd Series) 134	The Far, Far North		Anon. (E. M. Burrage)		
The Union Jack (2nd Series) 135	Sexton Blake, K. C.		Anon. (E. J. Gannon)		
The Union Jack (2nd Series) 136	Sexton Blake at Bay		Anon. (Cecil Hayter)		
The Union Jack (2nd Series) 137	The Camera Detective		Anon. (Norman Goddard)	Detective-Inspector Spearing	
The Union Jack (2nd Series) 138	The Toilers of the Night		Anon. (William Murray Graydon)		
The Union Jack (2nd Series) 139	Sexton Blake in Zululand		Anon. (W. B. Home-Gall)		
The Union Jack (2nd Series) 140	Sexton Blake, King's Messenger		Anon. (E. W. Alais)		
The Union Jack (2nd Series) 141	The Fisherman Detective		Anon. (Paul Herring)		
The Union Jack (2nd Series) 142	Sexton Blake's Ordeal		Anon. (E. J. Gannon)		
The Union Jack (2nd Series) 143	The Collier Detective		Anon. (E. A. Treeton)		
The Union Jack (2nd Series) 144	The American Detective		Anon. (Norman Goddard)		
The Union Jack (2nd Series) 145	Sexton Blake in Chicago		Anon. (William Murray Graydon)		
The Union Jack (2nd Series) 146	Sexton Blake in Java		Anon. (William Murray Graydon)		
The Union Jack (2nd Series) 147	Footlight Favourites		Anon. (F. H. Evans)		
The Union Jack (2nd Series) 148	The Clue of the Microscope		Anon. (William Murray Graydon)		
The Union Jack (2nd Series) 149	Sexton Blake's Romance		Anon. (C. E. Pearce)		
The Union Jack (2nd Series) 150	The Missing 13		Anon. (E. J. Gannon)		
The Union Jack (2nd Series) 151	The Pierrot Detective		Anon. (F. H. Evans)		
The Union Jack (2nd Series) 152	The Steward Detective		Anon. (William Murray Graydon)		
The Union Jack (2nd Series) 153	Sexton Blake Among the Brigands		Anon. (Cicely Hamilton)		
The Union Jack (2nd Series) 154	The German Detective		Anon. (Norman Goddard)	Detective-Inspector Spearing	Sexton Blake is summoned to Germany by Kaiser Wilhelm II
The Union Jack (2nd Series) 155	Three on the Trail		Anon. (A. G. Pearson)		
The Union Jack (2nd Series) 156	By Pigeon Post		Anon. (William Murray Graydon)		
The Union Jack (2nd Series) 157	Guardian of the Light		Anon. (William Murray Graydon)		
The Union Jack (2nd Series) 158	Sexton Blake in Gibraltar		Anon. (Norman Goddard)	Detective-Inspector Will Spearing	
The Union Jack (2nd Series) 159	The Watchman Detective		Anon. (Edgar Pickering)		
The Union Jack (2nd Series) 160	Lost Pedro		Anon. (William Murray Graydon)		
The Union Jack (2nd Series) 161	Sexton Blake in Patagonia		Anon. (Cecil Hayter)		
The Union Jack (2nd Series) 162	The Legion of Honour		Anon. (William Murray Graydon)		
The Union Jack (2nd Series) 163	Butler and Page		Anon. (E. W. Alais)	Jospeh Humm "the Human Sleuth-Hound"	
The Union Jack (2nd Series) 164	Capital and Labour		Anon. (Norman Goddard)		
The Union Jack (2nd Series) 165	Five Years After		Anon. (William Murray Graydon)		
The Union Jack (2nd Series) 166	Hot on the Scent		Anon. (E. J. Gannon)		
The Union Jack (2nd Series) 167	Lost on the Alps		Anon. (Cicely Hamilton)		
The Union Jack (2nd Series) 168	A New Year's Mystery		Anon. (Cicely Hamilton)		

== 1907 ==
Publication	Title	Format	Author	Key Characters	Notes
The Boys' Friend 294–315	Sexton Blake in the Congo	Serial. Part 1–21	Anon. (William Murray Graydon)	Shumpogaas, a giant Zulu warrior	William Murray Graydon's best remembered works are Sexton Blake in the Congo and Across the Equator, two long serials that ran in Boys' Friend in 1907. King Edward sends Blake on a secret mission to the Congo to learn if reports of atrocities coming out of that nation are true. They may have contributed to a change in public and government perceptions on 'colonial efforts' there.
The Boys' Friend 316–330	Across the Equator	Serial. Part 1–14	Anon. (William Murray Graydon)		The continuation of Sexton Blake in the Congo.
The Boys' Friend Library 10	Sexton Blake's Honour		Anon. (Norman Goddard)	Nigel Blake, Sexton Blake's brother	
The Boys' Friend Library 27	A Woolwich Arsenal Mystery		Anon. (E. J. Gannon)		
The Boys' Herald 212–232	The Coster King	Serial. Part 1–21	Anon. (E. W. Alais)	Introducing Henry Higgins, Fighting Jess, Josiah Pounce, and Jospeh Humm "the Human Sleuth-Hound"	
The Boys' Realm 240	The Shadow		Anon. (William Murray Graydon)		
The Boys' Realm 266	The Man From Scotland Yard		Anon. (Unknown)		
The Penny Pictorial 428	Sexton Blake; Detective. No.1 – Missing!		Anon. (Unknown)		
The Penny Pictorial 429	Sexton Blake; Detective. No.2 – Mark X		Anon. (Unknown)		
The Penny Pictorial 430	Sexton Blake; Detective. No.3 – The Triangle		Anon. (Unknown)		
The Penny Pictorial 431	Sexton Blake; Detective. No.4 – Mars II		Anon. (Unknown)		
The Penny Pictorial 432	Sexton Blake; Detective. No.5 – Blackmail		Anon. (Unknown)		
The Penny Pictorial 433	Sexton Blake; Detective. No.6 – The Dorset Jewels		Anon. (Unknown)		
The Penny Pictorial 434	Sexton Blake; Detective. No.7 – The Missing Picture		Anon. (Unknown)		
The Penny Pictorial 435	The Pretty Princess		Anon. (Cecil Hayter)		
The Penny Pictorial 436	The Trunk Mystery		Anon. (Cecil Hayter)		
The Penny Pictorial 437	The Spy		Anon. (Cecil Hayter)		
The Penny Pictorial 438	The Safe-Breaker		Anon. (Cecil Hayter)		
The Penny Pictorial 439	Within An Ace		Anon. (Cecil Hayter)		
The Penny Pictorial 440	The Tragedy of No. 9 Hole		Anon. (Cecil Hayter)		
The Penny Pictorial 441	The Banished Princess and Her Daughter		Anon. (Cecil Hayter)		
The Penny Pictorial 442	The Last of the Red Triangle		Anon. (Cecil Hayter)		
The Penny Pictorial 443	The Case of Lord Richard Mansbridge		Anon. (Cecil Hayter)		
The Penny Pictorial 444	The Fernham Road Mystery		Anon. (Cecil Hayter)		
The Penny Pictorial 445	The King's Messenger		Anon. (Cecil Hayter)		
The Penny Pictorial 446	The Mafia		Anon. (Cecil Hayter)		
The Penny Pictorial 447	The Weird Adventure of "Lady Anne"		Anon. (Cecil Hayter)		
The Penny Pictorial 448	The Clairvoyant		Anon. (Cecil Hayter)		
The Union Jack (2nd Series) 169	A Football Mystery		Anon. (W. J. Lomax)		
The Union Jack (2nd Series) 170	The Case of the Rival Detectives		Anon. (William Murray Graydon)		
The Union Jack (2nd Series) 171	The Slave Market		Anon. (Cecil Hayter)	Sir Richard Losely and Lobangu	This case marks the debut of two of Blake's most popular allies: Sir Richard Losely and Lobangu, the mighty chief of the Etbaia tribe of Zulus.
The Union Jack (2nd Series) 172	The Laird of Durrisdeer		Anon. (William Murray Graydon)		
The Union Jack (2nd Series) 173	Sexton Blake M.P.		Anon. (E. J. Gannon)		
The Union Jack (2nd Series) 174	The Doctor Detective		Anon. (Norman Goddard)		
The Union Jack (2nd Series) 175	Sexton Blake, Shopwalker		Anon. (W. J. Lomax)		
The Union Jack (2nd Series) 176	Sexton Blake in Jamaica		Anon. (William Murray Graydon)		
The Union Jack (2nd Series) 177	Salvation Army Blake		Anon. (Norman Goddard)		
The Union Jack (2nd Series) 178	Struck off the Rolls		Anon. (E. J. Gannon)		
The Union Jack (2nd Series) 179	The Seamy Side		Anon. (William Murray Graydon)		
The Union Jack (2nd Series) 180	Tinker's Triumph		Anon. (E. W. Alais)		
The Union Jack (2nd Series) 181	Sexton Blake's Zulu		Anon. (Cecil Hayter)	Sir Richard Losely and Lobangu	
The Union Jack (2nd Series) 182	Blackmail!		Anon. (W. J. Lomax)		
The Union Jack (2nd Series) 183	Sexton Blake in Wales		Anon. (Cicely Hamilton)		
The Union Jack (2nd Series) 184	In the Hands of the Moneylenders		Anon. (Norman Goddard)		
The Union Jack (2nd Series) 185	The Remittance Man		Anon. (E. J. Gannon)		
The Union Jack (2nd Series) 186	The "Ticket-of-Leave" Man		Anon. (W. J. Lomax)		
The Union Jack (2nd Series) 187	The Empty House		Anon. (E. W. Alais)		
The Union Jack (2nd Series) 188	Sexton Blake in Ireland		Anon. (E. J. Gannon)		
The Union Jack (2nd Series) 189	The Dockyard Detective		Anon. (E. Pickering)		
The Union Jack (2nd Series) 190	The Stock Exchange Detective		Anon. (A. C. Murray)		
The Union Jack (2nd Series) 191	The Stolen Gainsborough		Anon. (A. S. Hardy)		
The Union Jack (2nd Series) 192	The Society Detective		Anon. (F. H. Evans)		
The Union Jack (2nd Series) 193	Beware!		Anon. (William Murray Graydon)		
The Union Jack (2nd Series) 194	The Fire-Worshippers		Anon. (Cicely Hamilton)		
The Union Jack (2nd Series) 195	The Broker's Man		Anon. (Norman Goddard)		
The Union Jack (2nd Series) 196	The Mesmerist Detective		Anon. (Norman Goddard)		
The Union Jack (2nd Series) 197	The Case of the Missing President		Anon. (E. H. Burrage)		
The Union Jack (2nd Series) 198	Sexton Blake, Cheap-Jack		Anon. (E. W. Alais)		
The Union Jack (2nd Series) 199	Sexton Blake in Ashanti		Anon. (W. J. Lomax)		
The Union Jack (2nd Series) 200	(1) The Case of the Coroner's Court (2) Missing!		(1) Anon. (E. J. Gannon) (2) Anon. (Unknown)		
The Union Jack (2nd Series) 201	The Sleeping Sickness		Anon. (Cecil Hayter)	Sir Richard Losely and Lobangu	
The Union Jack (2nd Series) 202	Sexton Blake at the Opera		Anon. (William Murray Graydon)		
The Union Jack (2nd Series) 203	Base Coin		Anon. (A. S. Hardy)		
The Union Jack (2nd Series) 204	The Stolen Mummy		Anon. (William Murray Graydon)		
The Union Jack (2nd Series) 205	Sexton Blake in Amsterdam		Anon. (Cicely Hamilton)		
The Union Jack (2nd Series) 206	Sexton Blake, Whaler		Anon. (Cecil Hayter)	Sir Richard Losely and Lobangu	
The Union Jack (2nd Series) 207	Sexton Blake – Lumberman		Anon. (Norman Goddard)		
The Union Jack (2nd Series) 208	Sexton Blake, Private Secretary		Anon. (W. J. Lomax)		
The Union Jack (2nd Series) 209	Sexton Blake on the Moors		Anon. (William Murray Graydon)		
The Union Jack (2nd Series) 210	The Mystery of the Lightship		Anon. (Cicely Hamilton)		
The Union Jack (2nd Series) 211	The Cattle Mystery		Anon. (Norman Goddard)		
The Union Jack (2nd Series) 212	The Stag at Bay		Anon. (William Murray Graydon)		
The Union Jack (2nd Series) 213	The Cardsharper		Anon. (W. J. Lomax)		
The Union Jack (2nd Series) 214	Sexton Blake on Devil's Island		Anon. (A. S. Hardy)		
The Union Jack (2nd Series) 215	Sexton Blake, Insurance Detective		Anon. (E. J. Gannon)		
The Union Jack (2nd Series) 216	The Foreign Legion		Anon. (William Murray Graydon)		
The Union Jack (2nd Series) 217	The Slate Club Scandals		Anon. (Norman Goddard)		
The Union Jack (2nd Series) 218	By Royal Command		Anon. (William Murray Graydon)		
The Union Jack (2nd Series) 219	The Case of the Lost Husband		Anon. (W. J. Lomax)		
The Union Jack (2nd Series) 220	Sexton Blake, Chemist		Anon. (Cicely Hamilton)		

== 1908 ==
Publication	Title	Format	Author	Key Characters	Notes
Answers Weekly 1,059	A Confidential Report	Short Story	Anon. Maxwell Scott (John William Staniforth)		Sexton Blake begins to appear in Answers Weekly. These are very short tales and would continue to be published for the next four years.
Answers Weekly 1,060	The Silver Candlestick	Short Story	Anon. Maxwell Scott (John William Staniforth)		
Answers Weekly 1,061	My Lord the Baby	Short Story	Anon. Maxwell Scott (John William Staniforth)		
Answers Weekly 1,062	Who Stole the Cup?	Short Story	Anon. Maxwell Scott (John William Staniforth)		
Answers Weekly 1,063	The Diamond Star	Short Story	Anon. Maxwell Scott (John William Staniforth)		
Answers Weekly 1,064	The Midnight Operation	Short Story	Anon. Maxwell Scott (John William Staniforth)		
Answers Weekly 1,065	The Man From York	Short Story	Anon. Maxwell Scott (John William Staniforth)		
Answers Weekly 1,067	O. H. M. S.	Short Story	Anon. Maxwell Scott (John William Staniforth)		
Answers Weekly 1,068	The Mummer's Wife	Short Story	Anon. Maxwell Scott (John William Staniforth)		
Answers Weekly 1,069	The Tattooed Eye	Short Story	Anon. Maxwell Scott (John William Staniforth)		
Answers Weekly 1,070	A Knotty Problem	Short Story	Anon. Maxwell Scott (John William Staniforth)		
Answers Weekly 1,071	The Three Links	Short Story	Anon. Maxwell Scott (John William Staniforth)		
Answers Weekly 1,073	Mrs. Lambert's Lodger	Short Story	Anon.Maxwell Scott (John William Staniforth)		
Answers Weekly 1,074	A Slip of the Pen	Short Story	Anon. Maxwell Scott (John William Staniforth)		
The Boys' Friend 392	One Minute To Live		Anon. (Unknown)		
The Boys' Friend Library 39	Sexton Blake in Siberia		Anon. (William Murray Graydon)		
The Boys' Friend Library 49	The Sleep-walker		Anon. (E. J. Gannon)		
The Boys' Friend Library 54	Tiller and Tide-way		Anon. (E. W. Alais)		
The Boys' Friend Library 57	Sexton Blake, Clerk		Anon. (E. J. Gannon)		
The Boys' Friend Library 68	Sexton Blake's Trust		Anon. (E. J. Gannon)		
The Boys' Herald 238–262	Sexton Blake at School	Serial: Part 1–25)	Anon. (Cecil Hayter)		
The Boys' Herald 263–278	Sexton Blake in the Sixth	Serial: Part 1–16)	Anon. (Cecil Hayter)		
The Boys' Herald 279–284	Sexton Blake at Oxford	Serial: Part 1–6)	Anon. (Cecil Hayter)		
The Penny Pictorial 449	The Browning Claimant		Anon. (Cecil Hayter)		
The Penny Pictorial 450	In Dire Straits		Anon. (Cecil Hayter)		
The Penny Pictorial 451	The Affair of the Argosy Patent		Anon. (Cecil Hayter)		
The Penny Pictorial 452	The Great Bullion Robbery		Anon. (Cecil Hayter)		
The Penny Pictorial 453	The Jewel Maker		Anon. (Cecil Hayter)		
The Penny Pictorial 454	Nurse Elma's Patient		Anon. (Cecil Hayter)		
The Penny Pictorial 455	The Case of the Coloured Lights		Anon. (Cecil Hayter)		
The Penny Pictorial 456	The Recipe For Diamonds		Anon. (Cecil Hayter)		
The Penny Pictorial 457	A Case of Kidnapping		Anon. (Cecil Hayter)		
The Penny Pictorial 458	The Case of the Missing Heirlooms		Anon. (Cecil Hayter)		
The Penny Pictorial 459	The Chinese Money-Box		Anon. (Cecil Hayter)		
The Penny Pictorial 460	The Black Orchid		Anon. (Cecil Hayter)		
The Penny Pictorial 461	The Great Convent Robbery		Anon. (Cecil Hayter)		
The Penny Pictorial 462	The Mystery of Marsh Bottom		Anon. (Cecil Hayter)		
The Penny Pictorial 463	A White Man		Anon. (Cecil Hayter)		
The Penny Pictorial 464	An Easter Mystery		Anon. (Cecil Hayter)		
The Penny Pictorial 465	The Clue of the Fingerprints		Anon. (Cecil Hayter)		
The Penny Pictorial 466	The Withered Hand		Anon. (Cecil Hayter)		
The Penny Pictorial 467	The Case of Miss Louro		Anon. (Cecil Hayter)		
The Penny Pictorial 468	Lord Moordale's Mystery-Picture		Anon. (Cecil Hayter)		
The Penny Pictorial 469	Lady Ulswater's Pearls		Anon. (Cecil Hayter)		
The Penny Pictorial 470	The Messenger of Death		Anon. (Cecil Hayter)		
The Penny Pictorial 471	The House in Charles Street		Anon. (Cecil Hayter)		
The Penny Pictorial 472	A Scrap of Blue Paper		Anon. (Cecil Hayter)		
The Penny Pictorial 473	The Bungalow Mystery		Anon. (Cecil Hayter)		
The Penny Pictorial 474	The Case of the Princess Lara		Anon. (Cecil Hayter)		
The Penny Pictorial 475	The Case of the Shipbuilder's Clerk		Anon. (Cecil Hayter)		
The Penny Pictorial 476	The Case of the Strange Advertisement		Anon. (Cecil Hayter)		
The Penny Pictorial 477	The Case of the Emerald Star		Anon. (Cecil Hayter)		
The Penny Pictorial 478	Red Sand		Anon. (Cecil Hayter)		
The Penny Pictorial 479	The Thorpe End Mystery		Anon. (Cecil Hayter)		
The Penny Pictorial 480	The Episode of Mr. Pederson		Anon. (Cecil Hayter)		
The Penny Pictorial 481	The Colonel's Luck		Anon. (Cecil Hayter)		
The Penny Pictorial 482	The Clue of the Stained Cigarette		Anon. (Cecil Hayter)		
The Penny Pictorial 483	A Royal Loan		Anon. (Cecil Hayter)		
The Penny Pictorial 484	The Great Hotel Robbery		Anon. (Cecil Hayter)		
The Penny Pictorial 485	The Man With the Weak Heart		Anon. (Cecil Hayter)		
The Penny Pictorial 486	Sexton Blake's Understudy		Anon. (Cecil Hayter)	Lady Marjorie Maxwell	Lady Marjorie Maxwell 'The Greatest Lady Detective' trained by Sexton Blake. Known as 'Lady Molly'
The Penny Pictorial 487	The Disappearance of Leila Newbury		Anon. (Cecil Hayter)		
The Penny Pictorial 488	The Two M's		Anon. (Cecil Hayter)	Lady Molly	
The Penny Pictorial 489	The Case of the Second Mate		Anon. (Cecil Hayter)		
The Penny Pictorial 490	The Case of the Missing Minister		Anon. (E. Sempill aka M. Storm)	Lady Molly	
The Penny Pictorial 491	The Mystery of the Egyptian Bonds		Anon. (E. Sempill aka M. Storm)	Master villain debut: Rupert Forbes	Rupert Forbes, Confidence man. One of the first super villains to match wits with Blake.
The Penny Pictorial 492	A Mystery of the Moors		Anon. (Cecil Hayter)	Lady Molly	
The Penny Pictorial 493	The Case of the White Satin Dress		Anon. (Cecil Hayter)	Lady Molly	
The Penny Pictorial 494	The Mystery of the Second Floor		Anon. (Cecil Hayter)		
The Penny Pictorial 495	The Case of Squire Falconer		Anon. (Cecil Hayter)		
The Penny Pictorial 496	The Case of Marie Zoulovitch		Anon. (Cecil Hayter)		
The Penny Pictorial 497	The Case of the Crawley Miser		Anon. (Cecil Hayter)		
The Penny Pictorial 498	Twelve Hours' Purchase		Anon. (Cecil Hayter)		
The Penny Pictorial 499	Lady Molly's First Case		Anon. (E. Sempill aka M. Storm)	Lady Molly	
The Penny Pictorial 500	The Case of the First-Class Smoker		Anon. (Cecil Hayter)		
The Union Jack (2nd Series) 221	The House of Fear		Anon. (L. J. Beeston)		
The Union Jack (2nd Series) 222	The Man From Scotland Yard		Anon. (E. Sempill aka M. Storm)	Master villain debut: George Marsden Plummer	George Marsden Plummer; A Detective-Sergeant at Scotland Yard turned criminal, and one of Blake's toughest foes. Plummer matched wits with Blake repeatedly over the next 25 years, appearing in 125 tales.
The Union Jack (2nd Series) 223	The Case of the Missing Bride		Anon. (W. J. Lomax)		
The Union Jack (2nd Series) 224	Sexton Blake's Championship		Anon. (Norman Goddard)		
The Union Jack (2nd Series) 225	Sexton Blake in Morocco		Anon. (E. W. Alais)		
The Union Jack (2nd Series) 226	The Mystery of the Mint		Anon. (W. J. Lomax)		
The Union Jack (2nd Series) 227	The Flood		Anon. (William Murray Graydon)		
The Union Jack (2nd Series) 228	Sexton Blake in Baku		Anon. (E. J. Gannon)		
The Union Jack (2nd Series) 229	By Order of the Foreign Office		Anon. (Cecil Hayter)	Sir Richard Losely and Lobangu	
The Union Jack (2nd Series) 230	Sexton Blake, Wrestler		Anon. (A. S. Hardy)		
The Union Jack (2nd Series) 231	Pedro's Trail		Anon. (E. J. Gannon)		
The Union Jack (2nd Series) 232	Sexton Blake in Turkey		Anon. (William Murray Graydon)		
The Union Jack (2nd Series) 233	Sexton Blake in Rome		Anon. (William Murray Graydon)		
The Union Jack (2nd Series) 234	Sexton Blake at Court		Anon. (E. J. Gannon)		
The Union Jack (2nd Series) 235	Sexton Blake, N.S.P.C.C.		Anon. (Norman Goddard)	Detective Will Spearing	
The Union Jack (2nd Series) 236	A Ward in Chancery		Anon. (William Murray Graydon)		
The Union Jack (2nd Series) 237	Sexton Blake at Monte Carlo		Anon. (W. J. Lomax)		
The Union Jack (2nd Series) 238	The Master Anarchist		Anon. (E. Sempill aka M. Storm)		This tale features the kidnapping of a young prince Edward VIII.
The Union Jack (2nd Series) 239	Sexton Blake; Pavement Artist		Anon. (L. J. Beeston)		
The Union Jack (2nd Series) 240	The Secret Society		Anon. (Edgar Pickering)		
The Union Jack (2nd Series) 241	The Black Tyrant		Anon. (William Murray Graydon)		
The Union Jack (2nd Series) 242	Sexton Blake's Double Event		Anon. (Norman Goddard)	Detective Will Spearing	
The Union Jack (2nd Series) 243	Drink!		Anon. (W. J. Lomax)		
The Union Jack (2nd Series) 244	Through the Enemy's Country		Anon. (Cecil Hayter)	Sir Richard Losely and Lobangu	
The Union Jack (2nd Series) 245	The Conscript		Anon. (William Murray Graydon)		
The Union Jack (2nd Series) 246	Sexton Blake: Ambassador		Anon. (W. J. Lomax)		
The Union Jack (2nd Series) 247	Bankrupt!		Anon. (G. Carr)		
The Union Jack (2nd Series) 248	Sexton Blake – Longshoreman		Anon. (E. J. Gannon)		
The Union Jack (2nd Series) 249	Caravan and Canvas		Anon. (E. W. Alais)		
The Union Jack (2nd Series) 250	The Apaches of Paris		Anon. (William Murray Graydon)		
The Union Jack (2nd Series) 251	Libel and Slander		Anon. (W. J. Lomax)		
The Union Jack (2nd Series) 252	Spearing's Disgrace		Anon. (Norman Goddard)	Detective Will Spearing	
The Union Jack (2nd Series) 253	The Case of the Naval Manoeuvres		Anon. (Norman Goddard)	Detective Will Spearing	
The Union Jack (2nd Series) 254	The Mystery of Moorside		Anon. (William J. Bayfield)		
The Union Jack (2nd Series) 255	Sexton Blake in Glasgow		Anon. (William Murray Graydon)		
The Union Jack (2nd Series) 256	Sexton Blake: Chef		Anon. (F. H. Evans)		
The Union Jack (2nd Series) 257	The Specialist		Anon. (D. H. Parry)		
The Union Jack (2nd Series) 258	The Hop Pickers		Anon. (William Murray Graydon)		
The Union Jack (2nd Series) 259	The Tramp Detective		Anon. (E. W. Alais)		
The Union Jack (2nd Series) 260	The Motor-Boat		Anon. (A. S. Hardy)		
The Union Jack (2nd Series) 261	Sexton Blake in Cardiff		Anon. (William J. Bayfield)		
The Union Jack (2nd Series) 262	The Mount Street Mystery		Anon. (E. Sempill aka M. Storm)		
The Union Jack (2nd Series) 263	The Willow Court Mystery		Anon. (L. J. Beeston)		
The Union Jack (2nd Series) 264	The Deaf Mute		Anon. (William Murray Graydon)		
The Union Jack (2nd Series) 265	Sexton Blake, Gypsy		Anon. (Edgar Pickering)		
The Union Jack (2nd Series) 266	The Stolen Bloodhound		Anon. (William Murray Graydon)		
The Union Jack (2nd Series) 267	Quarantined		Anon. (William Murray Graydon)		
The Union Jack (2nd Series) 268	The Hypnotist		Anon. (D. H. Parry)		
The Union Jack (2nd Series) 269	The Ghost of Rupert Forbes		Anon. (E. Sempill aka M. Storm)	Rupert Forbes	Rupert Forbes makes his second appearance.
The Union Jack (2nd Series) 270	The Great Cattle Show Mystery		Anon. (E. J. Gannon)		
The Union Jack (2nd Series) 271	The Kaiser's Mistake		Anon. (D. H. Parry)		
The Union Jack (2nd Series) 272	The Family Skeleton		Anon. (William Murray Graydon)		

== 1909 ==
Publication	Title	Format	Author	Key Characters	Notes
Answers Weekly 1,075	A Modern Alchemist	Short Story	Anon. (Unknown)		
Answers Weekly 1,076	An Artificial Clue	Short Story	Anon. (Unknown)		
Answers Weekly 1,077	The King's Diamond	Short Story	Anon. (Unknown)		
Answers Weekly 1,078	The Morehampton Mystery	Short Story	Anon. (Unknown)		
Answers Weekly 1,079	Dr. Shaw's Assistant	Short Story	Anon. (Unknown)		
Answers Weekly 1,080	The House on the Cliff	Short Story	Anon. (Unknown)		
Answers Weekly 1,081	The Ancient Monk	Short Story	Anon. (Unknown)		
Answers Weekly 1,082	The Black Cat	Short Story	Anon. (Unknown)		
Answers Weekly 1,083	The Tower of Silence	Short Story	Anon. (Unknown)		
Answers Weekly 1,084	An Old Man's Darling	Short Story	Anon. (Unknown)		
Answers Weekly 1,085	The Blue Line	Short Story	Anon. (Unknown)		
Answers Weekly 1,086	The Plaster Saint	Short Story	Anon. (Unknown)		
Answers Weekly 1,087	The Tiger's Eye	Short Story	Anon. (Unknown)		
Answers Weekly 1,088	The Amateur Burglar	Short Story	Anon. (Unknown)		
Answers Weekly 1,089	The Empty Tin	Short Story	Anon. (Unknown)		
Answers Weekly 1,090	By Ponk	Short Story	Anon. (Unknown)		
Answers Weekly 1,091	The Silver Lock	Short Story	Anon. (Unknown)		
Answers Weekly 1,092	The Golden One	Short Story	Anon. (Unknown)		
Answers Weekly 1,093	The Young Earl	Short Story	Anon. (Unknown)		
Answers Weekly 1,094	The White Mouse	Short Story	Anon. (Unknown)		
Answers Weekly 1,095	No Robbery	Short Story	Anon. (Unknown)		
Answers Weekly 1,096	The Case of Mr. Seymour	Short Story	Anon. (Unknown)		
Answers Weekly 1,097	A Holiday Task	Short Story	Anon. (Unknown)		
Answers Weekly 1,098	The Case of Sir J. Lamson	Short Story	Anon. (Andrew Murray)		
Answers Weekly 1,099	A Marked Hand	Short Story	Anon. (Unknown)		
Answers Weekly 1,100	For Safe Deposit	Short Story	Anon. (Unknown)		
Answers Weekly 1,101	The Man in the Blue Blouse	Short Story	Anon. (Unknown)		
Answers Weekly 1,102	The Barton Tunnel Mystery	Short Story	Anon. (Unknown)		
Answers Weekly 1,103	The Ruthless Hand	Short Story	Anon. (Unknown)		
Answers Weekly 1,106	The Adventure of the Coffee Pot	Short Story	Anon. (Unknown)		
Answers Weekly 1,107	Lady Sylvester's Necklace	Short Story	Anon. (Unknown)		
Answers Weekly 1,108	The Mystery of the Empty Nut-shells	Short Story	Anon. (Unknown)		
Answers Weekly 1,109	The Black Pearl of Bahrein	Short Story	Anon. (Unknown)		
Answers Weekly 1,110	The Black Diamond	Short Story	Anon. (Unknown)		
Answers Weekly 1,111	The Sloane Street Affair	Short Story	Anon. (Unknown)		
Answers Weekly 1,112	The Leather Handled Parasol	Short Story	Anon. (Unknown)		
Answers Weekly 1,113	The Tortoiseshell Comb	Short Story	Anon. (Unknown)		
Answers Weekly 1,114	The Storton Motor Mystery	Short Story	Anon. (Unknown)		
Answers Weekly 1,115	The Case of the Cracked Mirror	Short Story	Anon. (Unknown)		
Answers Weekly 1,116	The Grosvenor Square Mystery	Short Story	Anon. (Unknown)		
Answers Weekly 1,117	The Sign of the Acorn	Short Story	Anon. (Unknown)		
Answers Weekly 1,120	The Broken Wicket Gate	Short Story	Anon. (Unknown)		
Answers Weekly 1,121	The Old Print Mystery	Short Story	Anon. (Unknown)		
Answers Weekly 1,122	The Barbed Dart	Short Story	Anon. (Unknown)		
Answers Weekly 1,123	The Mystery of the Lost Hair Pin	Short Story	Anon. (Unknown)		
Answers Weekly 1,124	The Snow Man	Short Story	Anon. (Unknown)		
Answers Weekly 1,125	The Missing Will	Short Story	Anon. (Unknown)		
Answers Weekly 1,126	That Priceless Pendant	Short Story	Anon. (Unknown)		
The Boys' Friend 405	The Mystery of Mayburg Reef		Anon. (Unknown)		
The Boys' Friend Library 72	The Coster King		Anon. (E. W. Alais)		
The Boys' Friend Library 88	The Mammoth Hunters		Anon. (Cecil Hayter)		
The Boys' Friend Library 96	The Mervyn Mystery		Anon. (E. Sempill aka M. Storm)	George Marsden Plummer and Rupert Forbes	George Marsden Plummer and Rupert Forbes team up. Unique to this tale, Sexton Blake is engaged to be married.
The Boys' Friend Library 102	Sexton Blake at School		Anon. (Cecil Hayter)		
The Boys' Friend Library 105	Sexton Blake in the Sixth		Anon. (Cecil Hayter)		
The Boys' Herald 285–297	Sexton Blake at Oxford	Serial. Part 7–19	Anon. (Cecil Hayter)		
The Boys' Herald 298	Sexton Blake, Steward (part 1) Plus: Sexton Blake at Oxford (part 20)		Anon. (Cecil Hayter)		
The Boys' Herald 299–313	Sexton Blake, Steward	Serial. Part 2–16	Anon. (Cecil Hayter)		
The Boys' Herald 321–327	The "Ticket-of-Leave" Man	Serial. Part 1–7	Anon. (William Murray Graydon)		
The Boys' Herald 329–336	The Winged Terror	Serial. Part 1–8	Anon. Maxwell Scott (John William Staniforth)		Sexton Blake teams up with friend and rival detective Nelson Lee.
The Penny Pictorial 501	The Case of Fort Montauban		Anon. (Cecil Hayter)		
The Penny Pictorial 502	The Ashford Place Mystery		Anon. (Cecil Hayter)		
The Penny Pictorial 503	The Case of the Missing Ledgers		Anon. (Cecil Hayter)		
The Penny Pictorial 504	The Case of the Woman at the Window		Anon. (Cecil Hayter)		
The Penny Pictorial 506	The Episode of the Missing Key		Anon. (Cecil Hayter)		
The Penny Pictorial 507	The Strange Case of a Motor Mishap		Anon. (Cecil Hayter)		
The Penny Pictorial 508	The Mystery of Major Gretton		Anon. (Cecil Hayter)		
The Penny Pictorial 509	The Episode of the Stolen Platinum		Anon. (Cecil Hayter)		
The Penny Pictorial 510	The Episode of the Stolen Baby		Anon. (Cecil Hayter)		
The Penny Pictorial 511	The Hampstead House Mystery		Anon. (Cecil Hayter)		
The Penny Pictorial 512	The Shadow		Anon. (Cecil Hayter)		
The Penny Pictorial 513	The Problem of His Grace of Maidenhead		Anon. (Cecil Hayter)		
The Penny Pictorial 514	The Mystery of Matt's Rest		Anon. (Cecil Hayter)		
The Penny Pictorial 515	The Episode of the Black Diamond		Anon. (Cecil Hayter)		
The Penny Pictorial 516	The Ardingley Wood Mystery		Anon. (Cecil Hayter)		
The Penny Pictorial 517	The Episode of the Little Red Image		Anon. (Cecil Hayter)		
The Penny Pictorial 518	The Problem of Cherriton Gardens		Anon. (Cecil Hayter)		
The Penny Pictorial 519	The Dodman's End Mystery		Anon. (Cecil Hayter)		
The Penny Pictorial 520	The Crawley Cottage Mystery		Anon. (Cecil Hayter)		
The Penny Pictorial 521	The Problem of the Second Melody		Anon. (Cecil Hayter)		
The Penny Pictorial 522	The Case of the Cortez Ruby		Anon. (E. Sempill aka M. Storm)		
The Penny Pictorial 523	The Long Stretton Mystery		Anon. (E. Sempill aka M. Storm)		
The Penny Pictorial 524	The Peveril Bay Mystery		Anon. (E. Sempill aka M. Storm)		
The Penny Pictorial 525	The East Coast Mystery		Anon. (E. Sempill aka M. Storm)		
The Penny Pictorial 526	The Case of Mr. & Mrs. Stanmore		Anon. (Cecil Hayter)		
The Penny Pictorial 527	The Problem of the Missing Minister		Anon. (Cecil Hayter)		
The Penny Pictorial 528	A Deal in Diamonds		Anon. (Cecil Hayter)		
The Penny Pictorial 529	The Case of the Haunted Room		Anon. (Cecil Hayter)		
The Penny Pictorial 530	The Problem of the Man From Russia		Anon. (Cecil Hayter)		
The Penny Pictorial 531	The Tragedy of the Halz Cavern		Anon. (E. Sempill aka M. Storm)		
The Penny Pictorial 532	The Episode of the Featherstone Pearls		Anon. (Cecil Hayter)		
The Penny Pictorial 533	From the North		Anon. (Cecil Hayter)		
The Penny Pictorial 534	The Secret Trial		Anon. (E. Sempill aka M. Storm)		
The Penny Pictorial 535	The Problem of Little Lord Bayfield		Anon. (Cecil Hayter)		
The Penny Pictorial 536	The Avengers		Anon. (Cecil Hayter)		
The Penny Pictorial 537	The Problem of the One-Legged Man		Anon. (Cecil Hayter)		
The Penny Pictorial 538	The Mystery of the Empty Bungalow		Anon. (Cecil Hayter)		
The Penny Pictorial 539	The Shadowy Third		Anon. (Cecil Hayter)		
The Penny Pictorial 540	The Case of the Dancing Bear		Anon. (Cecil Hayter)		
The Penny Pictorial 541	The Templecombe Mystery		Anon. (Cecil Hayter)		
The Penny Pictorial 542	The Mystery of the Riderless Cycle		Anon. (Cecil Hayter)		
The Penny Pictorial 543	The Problem of the Riveted Saucer		Anon. (Cecil Hayter)		
The Penny Pictorial 544	The Problem of the Fire Epidemic		Anon. (Cecil Hayter)		
The Penny Pictorial 545	Well Matched!		Anon. (E. Sempill aka M. Storm)	Marston Hume makes his debut.	Hume is the first recurring villain in the Blake canon. He appeared in a dozen tales from 1909 to 1910.
The Penny Pictorial 546	The Bara Diamond		Anon. (E. Sempill aka M. Storm)		A Marston Hume tale.
The Penny Pictorial 547	Parried!		Anon. (E. Sempill aka M. Storm)		A Marston Hume tale.
The Penny Pictorial 548	Quits!		Anon. (E. Sempill aka M. Storm)		A Marston Hume tale.
The Penny Pictorial 549	The Removal of Mr. Soames		Anon. (E. Sempill aka M. Storm)		A Marston Hume tale.
The Penny Pictorial 550	The Case of the Louis Quinze Snuff-Box		Anon. (E. Sempill aka M. Storm)		A Marston Hume tale.
The Penny Pictorial 551	Abducted!		Anon. (E. Sempill aka M. Storm)		A Marston Hume tale.
The Penny Pictorial 552	Blake Scores!		Anon. (E. Sempill aka M. Storm)		A Marston Hume tale.
The Union Jack (2nd Series) 273	The Vendetta!		Anon. (E. Sempill aka M. Storm)		
The Union Jack (2nd Series) 274	The Adventuress		Anon. (L. J. Beeston)		
The Union Jack (2nd Series) 275	£.s.d		Anon. (William J. Bayfield)		
The Union Jack (2nd Series) 276	Sexton Blake in Borneo		Anon. (E. W. Alais)		
The Union Jack (2nd Series) 277	The Road Hog		Anon. (E. Sempill aka M. Storm)		
The Union Jack (2nd Series) 278	The Man Hunt		Anon. (G. Carr)		
The Union Jack (2nd Series) 279	The Boarding House Mystery		Anon. (E. J. Gannon)		
The Union Jack (2nd Series) 280	The Three Brothers		Anon. (William Murray Graydon)		
The Union Jack (2nd Series) 281	20,000 Bail		Anon. (Norman Goddard)		
The Union Jack (2nd Series) 282	The Prodigal		Anon. (William Murray Graydon)		
The Union Jack (2nd Series) 283	Black and White		Anon. (William Murray Graydon)		
The Union Jack (2nd Series) 284	East and West		Anon. (William Murray Graydon)		
The Union Jack (2nd Series) 285	C.Q.D. (The Signal of Distress)		Anon. (Edgar Pickering)		
The Union Jack (2nd Series) 286	Azeff the Anarchist		Anon. (William Murray Graydon)		
The Union Jack (2nd Series) 287	The Old Age Pensions Mystery		Anon. (E. J. Gannon)		
The Union Jack (2nd Series) 288	Amongst the Unemployed		Anon. (Norman Goddard)		
The Union Jack (2nd Series) 289	The Five Towns		Anon. (William J. Bayfield)		
The Union Jack (2nd Series) 290	The White Chief		Anon. (Cecil Hayter)		
The Union Jack (2nd Series) 291	The Case of the Public Trustee		Anon. (E. J. Gannon)		
The Union Jack (2nd Series) 292	The Noiseless Gun		Anon. (William Murray Graydon)		
The Union Jack (2nd Series) 293	Gregory Sanderson's Will		Anon. (G. Carr)		
The Union Jack (2nd Series) 294	The Great Peerage Romance		Anon. (William Murray Graydon)		
The Union Jack (2nd Series) 295	The Emigrants		Anon. (Norman Goddard)		
The Union Jack (2nd Series) 296	The Affair of the Royal Hunt Cup		Anon. (William J. Bayfield)		
The Union Jack (2nd Series) 297	Sexton Blake, Publican		Anon. (E. W. Alais)		
The Union Jack (2nd Series) 298	Sexton Blake, Showman!		Anon. (A. S. Hardy)		
The Union Jack (2nd Series) 299	The Blue Room Mystery		Anon. (E. Sempill aka M. Storm)		
The Union Jack (2nd Series) 300	Unfrocked		Anon. (William Murray Graydon)		
The Union Jack (2nd Series) 301	The Great Motor Car Mystery		Anon. (A. C. Murray)		
The Union Jack (2nd Series) 302	In Deadly Grip		Anon. (E. Sempill aka M. Storm)	George Marsden Plummer.	The second appearance of George Marsden Plummer.
The Union Jack (2nd Series) 303	The Stepney Mystery		Anon. (E. Sempill aka M. Storm)		
The Union Jack (2nd Series) 304	The Case of the Naval Estimates		Anon. (E. J. Gannon)		
The Union Jack (2nd Series) 305	Sexton Blake, Lock-Keeper		Anon. (E. W. Alais)		
The Union Jack (2nd Series) 306	Sexton Blake in Blackpool		Anon. (E. J. Gannon)		
The Union Jack (2nd Series) 307	The Mystery of Dusky Hollow		Anon. (E. Sempill aka M. Storm)		
The Union Jack (2nd Series) 308	Sexton Blake, Bookmaker		Anon. (William J. Bayfield)		
The Union Jack (2nd Series) 309	Sexton Blake in Holland		Anon. (D. H. Parry)		
The Union Jack (2nd Series) 310	The Yellow Cord		Anon. (William Murray Graydon)		
The Union Jack (2nd Series) 311	The Racing World		Anon. (William J. Bayfield)		
The Union Jack (2nd Series) 312	The Mystery of the Scarlet Thread		Anon. (E. Sempill aka M. Storm)		
The Union Jack (2nd Series) 313	Sexton Blake — Consul		Anon. (E. J. Gannon)		
The Union Jack (2nd Series) 314	Sexton Blake, Playwright		Anon. (William Murray Graydon)		
The Union Jack (2nd Series) 315	The Swell Mobsman		Anon. (E. Sempill aka M. Storm)	George Marsden Plummer.	
The Union Jack (2nd Series) 316	The Jewel Thieves		Anon. (E. Sempill aka M. Storm)		
The Union Jack (2nd Series) 317	Sexton Blake — Aviator		Anon. (D. H. Parry)		
The Union Jack (2nd Series) 318	Bridge		Anon. (L. J. Beeston)		
The Union Jack (2nd Series) 319	Sexton Blake — Scout-Master		Anon. (Edgar Pickering)		
The Union Jack (2nd Series) 320	Sexton Blake, Squire		Anon. (E. W. Alais)		
The Union Jack (2nd Series) 321	Sexton Blake's Christmas Case		Anon. (William Murray Graydon)		
The Union Jack (2nd Series) 322	Sexton Blake, Sandwich-Man		Anon. (William Murray Graydon)		
The Union Jack (2nd Series) 323	The Third Degree		Anon. (William Murray Graydon)		
The Union Jack (2nd Series) 324	The Great Conspiracy		Anon. (E. Sempill aka M. Storm)		

== 1910 ==
Publication	Title	Format	Author	Key Characters	Notes
Answers Weekly 1,127	The Strange Case of the Millionaire	Short Story	Anon. (Unknown)		
Answers Weekly 1,128	The Broken Type Key	Short Story	Anon. (Unknown)		
Answers Weekly 1,129	A Back Room Mystery	Short Story	Anon. (Unknown)		
Answers Weekly 1,130	The Clue of the Torn Curtain	Short Story	Anon. (Unknown)		
Answers Weekly 1,131	The Crooked Telephone	Short Story	Anon. (Unknown)		
Answers Weekly 1,132	The Chilworth Emerald	Short Story	Anon. (Unknown)		
Answers Weekly 1,133	An Unscrupulous Rogue	Short Story	Anon. (Unknown)		
Answers Weekly 1,134	Mademoiselle Justine	Short Story	Anon. (Unknown)	Mademoiselle Justine de Chevrac	Mademoiselle Justine de Chevrac was Sexton Blake's first recurring female foe. Unlike many of the female foes that came before, crime was her profession. She may have had a slight influence on the adventuresses later created by George Hamilton Teed. Blake becomes infatuated with her.
Answers Weekly 1,135	The Adventure of the Lady Typist	Short Story	Anon. (Unknown)	Mademoiselle Justine de Chevrac	
Answers Weekly 1,136	The Affair of the Burgravian Attache	Short Story	Anon. (E. Sempill aka M. Storm)	Mademoiselle Justine de Chevrac	
Answers Weekly 1,137	The Affair of the Three Candles	Short Story	Anon. (Unknown)	Mademoiselle Justine de Chevrac	
Answers Weekly 1,138	The Mystery of the Callow Youth	Short Story	Anon. (Unknown)	Mademoiselle Justine de Chevrac	
Answers Weekly 1,140	The Goggenheim Bank Affair	Short Story	Anon. (Unknown)	Mademoiselle Justine de Chevrac	
Answers Weekly 1,141	The Great Auk's Egg Affair	Short Story	Anon. (Unknown)		
Answers Weekly 1,142	The Lucky Pig Case	Short Story	Anon. (Unknown)		
Answers Weekly 1,143	A Posthumous Revenge	Short Story	Anon. (Unknown)		
Answers Weekly 1,144	The Dilemma of the L. C. J.	Short Story	Anon. (Unknown)		
Answers Weekly 1,145	A Blind Chance	Short Story	Anon. (Unknown)		
Answers Weekly 1,146	The Recipe for Rubber	Short Story	Anon. (Unknown)		
Answers Weekly 1,147	The Gold Tooth	Short Story	Anon. (Unknown)		
Answers Weekly 1,148	The Incubator	Short Story	Anon. (Unknown)		
Answers Weekly 1,149	The Parrot and the Pearls	Short Story	Anon. (Unknown)		
Answers Weekly 1,150	The Marked Sovereign	Short Story	Anon. (Unknown)		
Answers Weekly 1,151	The Rug Box Mystery	Short Story	Anon. (Unknown)		
Answers Weekly 1,152	The Gaolbird's Feathers	Short Story	Anon. (Unknown)		
Answers Weekly 1,153	The Twisted Bicycle Spoke	Short Story	Anon. (Unknown)		
Answers Weekly 1,154	Poker Work	Short Story	Anon. (Unknown)		
Answers Weekly 1,155	The Stain on the Sill	Short Story	Anon. (Unknown)		
Answers Weekly 1,156	The Onyx Button	Short Story	Anon. (Unknown)		
Answers Weekly 1,157	The Skating Rink Mystery	Short Story	Anon. (Unknown)		
Answers Weekly 1,158	Pawned For 7/6	Short Story	Anon. (Unknown)		
Answers Weekly 1,159	The Man from Manchester	Short Story	Anon. (Unknown)		
Answers Weekly 1,160	Submarine F4	Short Story	Anon. (Unknown)		
Answers Weekly 1,161	Sexton Blake's Failure	Short Story	Anon. (Unknown)		
Answers Weekly 1,162	Sidbury's Scoop	Short Story	Anon. (Unknown)		
Answers Weekly 1,163	The Man on Ticket O' Leave	Short Story	Anon. (Unknown)		
Answers Weekly 1,164	The 1,000 Cheque	Short Story	Anon. (Unknown)		
Answers Weekly 1,165	P. C. Barter	Short Story	Anon. (Unknown)		
Answers Weekly 1,166	The Stolen Elephant	Short Story	Anon. (Unknown)		
Answers Weekly 1,167	In Wey's Copse	Short Story	Anon. (Unknown)		
Answers Weekly 1,168	The Lost Pom	Short Story	Anon. (Unknown)		
Answers Weekly 1,169	The Vicar's Overcoat	Short Story	Anon. (Unknown)		
Answers Weekly 1,170	The One Who Did It	Short Story	Anon. (Unknown)		
Answers Weekly 1,171	King Graft	Short Story	Anon. (Unknown)		
Answers Weekly 1,172	A Death-bed Marriage	Short Story	Anon. (Unknown)		
Answers Weekly 1,173	The Stolen Miniature	Short Story	Anon. (Unknown)		
Answers Weekly 1,174	The Mallingworth Mystery	Short Story	Anon. (Unknown)		
Answers Weekly 1,176	Kit the Jockey	Short Story	Anon. (Unknown)		
Answers Weekly 1,177	Steel Studs	Short Story	Anon. (Unknown)		
Answers Weekly 1,178	The Hiding Place	Short Story	Anon. (Unknown)		
Answers Weekly 1,179	The Message in Cipher	Short Story	Anon. (Unknown)		
The Boys' Friend 484–496	Sexton Blake, Foreman	Serial. Part 1–13	Anon. (E. W. Alais)		
The Boys' Friend 497–499	Sexton Blake, Spy	Serial. Part 1–3	Anon. (William Murray Graydon)		
The Boys' Friend Library 107	Sexton Blake at Oxford		Anon. (Cecil Hayter)		
The Boys' Friend Library 123	Sexton Blake in the Congo		Anon. (William Murray Graydon)		
The Boys' Friend Library 124	Across the Equator		Anon. (William Murray Graydon)		
The Boys' Friend Library 131	Detectives, Limited		Anon. (Norman Goddard)		
The Boys' Friend Library 134	The Mill-Master's Secret		Anon. (J. G. Jones)		
The Boys' Herald 337–349	The Winged Terror	Serial. Part 9–21	Anon. Maxwell Scott (John William Staniforth)		Features Nelson Lee.
The Penny Pictorial 553	The Case of the Writing in the Dust		Anon. (Cecil Hayter)		
The Penny Pictorial 554	The Case of the Three Women in Grey		Anon. (Cecil Hayter)		
The Penny Pictorial 555	Secret History		Anon. (Cecil Hayter)		
The Penny Pictorial 556	The Case of the Man in Blue Spectacles		Anon. (E. Sempill aka M. Storm)		
The Penny Pictorial 557	The Strange Case of Mr. Mostyn		Anon. (E. Sempill aka M. Storm)		
The Penny Pictorial 558	The Case of the Indian Idols		Anon. (E. Sempill aka M. Storm)		
The Penny Pictorial 559	The Missing Candidate		Anon. (Cecil Hayter)		
The Penny Pictorial 560	The Keeper of the Radium		Anon. (Cecil Hayter)		
The Penny Pictorial 561	The Episode of the Ivory Chopstick		Anon. (Cecil Hayter)		
The Penny Pictorial 563	The Mystery of No.10, Rue Rousillon		Anon. (Cecil Hayter)		
The Penny Pictorial 564	The Mystery of the Little White Room		Anon. (Cecil Hayter)		
The Penny Pictorial 565	The Episode of the Gipsies' Revenge		Anon. (E. Sempill aka M. Storm)		
The Penny Pictorial 566	The Mystery of a Taxi-Cab		Anon. (Cecil Hayter)		
The Penny Pictorial 567	The Problem of the Missing Volume		Anon. (Cecil Hayter)		
The Penny Pictorial 568	The Clue of the Clock		Anon. (Cecil Hayter)		
The Penny Pictorial 569	The Postponed Wedding		Anon. (Cecil Hayter)		
The Penny Pictorial 570	The Morton Crescent Mystery		Anon. (Cecil Hayter)		
The Penny Pictorial 571	The Case of the Scarred Neck		Anon. (Cecil Hayter)		
The Penny Pictorial 572	The Mystery of the Sele Train Murder		Anon. (E. Sempill aka M. Storm)		
The Penny Pictorial 573	The Case of the Condemned Hulk		Anon. (Cecil Hayter)		
The Penny Pictorial 574	The Dere Castle Mystery		Anon. (Cecil Hayter)		
The Penny Pictorial 575	Sudden Death		Anon. (E. Sempill aka M. Storm)		
The Penny Pictorial 576	The Disappearance of Mr. Rust		Anon. (Cecil Hayter)		
The Penny Pictorial 577	The Poisoned Teacup		Anon. (Cecil Hayter)		
The Penny Pictorial 578	The Haven Farm Mystery		Anon. (Cecil Hayter)		
The Penny Pictorial 579	The Problem of the Anonymous Letter		Anon. (Cecil Hayter)		
The Penny Pictorial 580	The Strange Case of Miss Massinger		Anon. (Cecil Hayter)		
The Penny Pictorial 581	The Problem of the Missing Turner		Anon. (Cecil Hayter)		
The Penny Pictorial 582	The Lurthing Road Mystery		Anon. (E. Sempill aka M. Storm)		
The Penny Pictorial 583	The Strange Case of the Missing Light-Weight		Anon. (Cecil Hayter)		
The Penny Pictorial 584	The Webber Mansions Murder		Anon. (Cecil Hayter)		
The Penny Pictorial 585	Alias Private Goodman		Anon. (E. Sempill aka M. Storm)		
The Penny Pictorial 586	At Close Quarters		Anon. (Cecil Hayter)		
The Penny Pictorial 587	The Case of the Mysterious Nun		Anon. (E. Sempill aka M. Storm)		
The Penny Pictorial 588	The Comberleigh House Mystery		Anon. (Cecil Hayter)		
The Penny Pictorial 589	The Colt Street Mystery		Anon. (Cecil Hayter)		
The Penny Pictorial 590	The Mystery of Miss Dumbarton's Diamond		Anon. (Cecil Hayter)		
The Penny Pictorial 591	The Mystery of the Five-Forty Train		Anon. (Cecil Hayter)		
The Penny Pictorial 592	The Strange Theft at Waydon Hall		Anon. (E. Sempill aka M. Storm)		
The Penny Pictorial 593	The Case of the 100-Note		Anon. (Cecil Hayter)		
The Penny Pictorial 594	The Case of the Murdered Moneylender		Anon. (E. Sempill aka M. Storm)		
The Penny Pictorial 595	The Tragedy of the Downdale Cliff		Anon. (E. Sempill aka M. Storm)		
The Penny Pictorial 596	"Accessory After the Fact"		Anon. (E. Sempill aka M. Storm)		
The Penny Pictorial 597	The Tragedy of Canum Reaches		Anon. (Cecil Hayter)		
The Penny Pictorial 600	The Case of the Grangemoor Murder		Anon. (Cecil Hayter)		
The Penny Pictorial 601	The Finch-Hutton Murder Case		Anon. (E. Sempill aka M. Storm)		
The Penny Pictorial 602	The Kidnapping of a King		Anon. (E. Sempill aka M. Storm)		
The Penny Pictorial 603	A Mysterious Disappearance		Anon. (Cecil Hayter)		
The Penny Pictorial 604	Trapped!		Anon. (E. Sempill aka M. Storm)		A Marston Hume tale.
The Penny Pictorial 605	The Case of the Man With the Missing Thumb		Anon. (E. Sempill aka M. Storm)		
The Union Jack (2nd Series) 325	Sexton Blake in Newfoundland		Anon. (E. W. Alais)		
The Union Jack (2nd Series) 326	Warned Off		Anon. (William J. Bayfield)		
The Union Jack (2nd Series) 327	The Great General Election Case		Anon. (William Murray Graydon)		
The Union Jack (2nd Series) 328	The Slum Landlord		Anon. (E. W. Alais)		
The Union Jack (2nd Series) 329	Found Drowned		Anon. (E. Sempill aka M. Storm)		
The Union Jack (2nd Series) 330	The Analyst Mystery		Anon. (William Murray Graydon)	Laban Creed	First appearance of master criminal Laban Creed.
The Union Jack (2nd Series) 331	The King's Secret		Anon. (E. W. Alais)		
The Union Jack (2nd Series) 332	Sexton Blake, Juryman		Anon. (E. J. Gannon)		
The Union Jack (2nd Series) 333	A Manchester Mystery		Anon. (William Murray Graydon)		
The Union Jack (2nd Series) 334	The Problem of the Yellow Button	George Marsden Plummer	Anon. (E. Sempill aka M. Storm)		
The Union Jack (2nd Series) 335	Sexton Blake in Vanity Fair		Anon. (W. J. Lomax)		
The Union Jack (2nd Series) 336	The Embankment Mystery		Anon. (William Murray Graydon)		
The Union Jack (2nd Series) 337	The Sailor's Return		Anon. (William Murray Graydon)		
The Union Jack (2nd Series) 338	The Case of the Small Holding		Anon. (E. J. Gannon)		
The Union Jack (2nd Series) 339	The Mystery of the Mediterranean		Anon. (E. J. Gannon)		
The Union Jack (2nd Series) 340	Sexton Blake, Postmaster		Anon. (W. J. Lomax)		
The Union Jack (2nd Series) 341	Sexton Blake in Hatton Garden		Anon. (W. J. Lomax)		
The Union Jack (2nd Series) 342	The Mystery of Room 11		Anon. (Norman Goddard)	George Marsden Plummer and John Marsh	Plummer joins forces with John Marsh for the first time. The two would fight Blake multiple times over the next four years, Marsh making his final appearance The Pursuit of Plummer, in Union Jack #547, published in 1914.
The Union Jack (2nd Series) 343	Sexton Blake – Trainer		Anon. (William J. Bayfield)		
The Union Jack (2nd Series) 344	The Mystery of the Tobacco Plantation		Anon. (William Murray Graydon)		
The Union Jack (2nd Series) 345	The Colonel's Charger		Anon. (William Murray Graydon)		
The Union Jack (2nd Series) 346	The Labour Exchange Mystery		Anon. (William Murray Graydon)		
The Union Jack (2nd Series) 347	Tracked by Aeroplane		Anon. (Norman Goddard)	Detective-Inspector Spearing	
The Union Jack (2nd Series) 348	Hara-Kiri		Anon. (W. J. Lomax)	Detective-Inspector Spearing	
The Union Jack (2nd Series) 349	The Great Rubber Syndicate		Anon. (J. G. Jones)		
The Union Jack (2nd Series) 350	Sexton Blake's Country Cottage		Anon. (William Murray Graydon)		
The Union Jack (2nd Series) 351	The Labour Member		Anon. (E. J. Gannon)		
The Union Jack (2nd Series) 352	On the Hire-System		Anon. (E. W. Alais)		
The Union Jack (2nd Series) 353	Sexton Blake, Tax Collector		Anon. (W. J. Lomax)		
The Union Jack (2nd Series) 354	The Rival Mills		Anon. (William Murray Graydon)		
The Union Jack (2nd Series) 355	Sexton Blake, Bath-Chair Man		Anon. (William Murray Graydon)		
The Union Jack (2nd Series) 356	The Nottingham Mystery		Anon. (William J. Bayfield)		
The Union Jack (2nd Series) 357	Plummer Versus Blake		Anon. (George Hamilton Teed)	George Marsden Plummer, John Marsh	
The Union Jack (2nd Series) 358	The Cellar Mystery		Anon. (Norman Goddard)	Detective-Inspector Spearing	
The Union Jack (2nd Series) 359	Sexton Blake, Territorial		Anon. (A. C. Murray)		
The Union Jack (2nd Series) 360	Sexton Blake – Tick-Tacker		Anon. (William J. Bayfield)		
The Union Jack (2nd Series) 361	Sexton Blake, Ice Cream Merchant		Anon. (W. J. Lomax)		
The Union Jack (2nd Series) 362	The Gold Mountain		Anon. (William Murray Graydon)		
The Union Jack (2nd Series) 363	The Flat Mystery		Anon. (Norman Goddard)		
The Union Jack (2nd Series) 364	The Nursing Home Mystery		Anon. (William Murray Graydon)		
The Union Jack (2nd Series) 365	The Cotton "Corner"		Anon. (Norman Goddard)	George Marsden Plummer, John Marsh	
The Union Jack (2nd Series) 366	Sexton Blake's Shooting Party		Anon. (William Murray Graydon)		
The Union Jack (2nd Series) 367	The Millionaire Baby		Anon. (Norman Goddard)		
The Union Jack (2nd Series) 368	Sexton Blake, Author		Anon. (William J. Bayfield)		
The Union Jack (2nd Series) 369	Sexton Blake, Taxi-cab Driver		Anon. (W. J. Lomax)		
The Union Jack (2nd Series) 370	The Case of the Exiled King		Anon. (Norman Goddard)		
The Union Jack (2nd Series) 371	The Great Stores Mystery		Anon. (J. G. Jones)		
The Union Jack (2nd Series) 372	Sexton Blake in Rhodesia		Anon. (E. W. Alais)		
The Union Jack (2nd Series) 373	The Coster's Christmas Plus: Sexton Blake, Unemployed		Anon. (Unknown) Anon. (D. H. Parry)		
The Union Jack (2nd Series) 374	Accessory After the Fact		Anon. (W. J. Lomax)		
The Union Jack (2nd Series) 375	The Great Bank Smash		Anon. (William Murray Graydon)		
The Union Jack (2nd Series) 376	Sexton Blake, Santa Claus		Anon. (William J. Bayfield)		
The Union Jack (2nd Series) 377	Contempt of Court		Anon. (Norman Goddard)		

== 1911 ==
Publication	Title	Format	Author	Key Characters	Notes
Answers Weekly 1,180	The First Burglary	Short Story	Anon. (Unknown)		
Answers Weekly 1,181	The Haunted Major	Short Story	Anon. (Unknown)		
Answers Weekly 1,182	A Bit o Crockery	Short Story	Anon. (Unknown)		
Answers Weekly 1,183	The Cigarette	Short Story	Anon. (Unknown)		
Answers Weekly 1,184	The Ferret	Short Story	Anon. (Unknown)		
Answers Weekly 1,185	A Rugby Scrimmage	Short Story	Anon. (Unknown)		
Answers Weekly 1,186	A Safe Place	Short Story	Anon. (Unknown)		
Answers Weekly 1,187	A Fifth Form Dilemma	Short Story	Anon. (Unknown)		
Answers Weekly 1,188	Diamond Cut Diamond	Short Story	Anon. (Unknown)		
Answers Weekly 1,189	A Moneyed Ghost	Short Story	Anon. (Unknown)		
Answers Weekly 1,190	Footmarks and Fingerprints	Short Story	Anon. (Unknown)		
Answers Weekly 1,191	The Money Bait	Short Story	Anon. (Unknown)		
Answers Weekly 1,192	The Professor's Landing Net	Short Story	Anon. (Unknown)		
Answers Weekly 1,193	The Clue of the Ash	Short Story	Anon. (Unknown)		
Answers Weekly 1,194	Sexton Blake's Surprise	Short Story	Anon. (Unknown)		
Answers Weekly 1,195	Hushed Up	Short Story	Anon. (Unknown)		
Answers Weekly 1,196	Sexton Blake, Diplomatist	Short Story	Anon. (Unknown)		
Answers Weekly 1,197	The Runaway	Short Story	Anon. (Unknown)		
Answers Weekly 1,198	A Question of Politics	Short Story	Anon. (Unknown)		
Answers Weekly 1,199	The Blue Diamond	Short Story	Anon. (Unknown)		
Answers Weekly 1,200	Mad Garborough's Luck	Short Story	Anon. (Unknown)		
Answers Weekly 1,201	The Junior Partner's Deal	Short Story	Anon. (Unknown)		
Answers Weekly 1,202	The Red Hand of Siva	Short Story	Anon. (Unknown)		
Answers Weekly 1,203	The Stolen Rifles	Short Story	Anon. (Unknown)		
Answers Weekly 1,204	A Terrible Predicament	Short Story	Anon. (Unknown)		
Answers Weekly 1,205	Look for the Lady	Short Story	Anon. (Unknown)		
Answers Weekly 1,206	The Tower of Diamonds	Short Story	Anon. (Unknown)		
Answers Weekly 1,207	In Borrowed Plumes	Short Story	Anon. (Unknown)		
Answers Weekly 1,208	Kirk, the Daw	Short Story	Anon. (Unknown)		
Answers Weekly 1,209	Contraband of War	Short Story	Anon. (Unknown)		
Answers Weekly 1,210	Her Father's Name	Short Story	Anon. (Unknown)		
Answers Weekly 1,212	The Polovnian Contract	Short Story	Anon. (Unknown)		
Answers Weekly 1,213	The Mystery of the Sandalwood Box	Short Story	Anon. (Unknown)		
Answers Weekly 1,215	A Mixed Bag	Short Story	Anon. (Unknown)		
Answers Weekly 1,216	The Stained Fingers	Short Story	Anon. (Unknown)		
Answers Weekly 1,217	The Three Detectives	Short Story	Anon. (Unknown)		
Answers Weekly 1,218	The Metal Disc Clue	Short Story	Anon. (Unknown)		
Answers Weekly 1,219	The Poisoned Peer	Short Story	Anon. (Unknown)		
Answers Weekly 1,220	His Highness's Hobby	Short Story	Anon. (Unknown)		
Answers Weekly 1,221	The Greenhouse at Hampstead	Short Story	Anon. (Unknown)		
Answers Weekly 1,222	The Tortoiseshell Comb	Short Story	Anon. (Unknown)		
Answers Weekly 1,224	The Case of Miss Clayford	Short Story	Anon. (Unknown)		
Answers Weekly 1,231	After Business Hours	Short Story	Anon. (Unknown)		
The Boys' Friend 500–505	Sexton Blake, Spy	Serial. Part 3–9	Anon. (William Murray Graydon)		
The Boys' Friend 537–551	Tinker's Schooldays	Serial. Part 1–15	Anon. (Cecil Hayter)		
The Boys' Friend Library 155	Ten Years Penal Servitude		Anon. (T. C. Bridges)		
The Boys' Friend Library 165	Sexton Blake's Quest		Anon. (William Murray Graydon)		
The Boys' Friend Library 172	Sexton Blake, Foreman		Anon. (E. W. Alais)		
The Boys' Friend Library 177	Sexton Blake, Steward		Anon. (E. W. Alais)		
The Boys' Herald 437	The Airship Spy		Anon. (Unknown)		
The Boys' Herald 438	Jack Arnley's Disappearance		Anon. (Unknown)		
The Boys' Herald 439	The Missing Millions		Anon. (Unknown)		
The Boys' Herald 440	The Strange Case of Mr. Smithers		Anon. (Unknown)		
The Boys' Herald 441	A Highland Mystery		Anon. (Unknown)		
The Magnet 189	Tinker's Schooldays (part 1)		Anon. (Cecil Hayter)		
The Penny Pictorial 606	The Great Bridge Tunnel Mystery		Anon. (E. Sempill aka M. Storm)	A Marston Hume tale	
The Penny Pictorial 607	Found Guilty!		Anon. (E. Sempill aka M. Storm)		The last Marston Hume tale.
The Penny Pictorial 608	A Difficult Problem		Anon. (E. Sempill aka M. Storm)		
The Penny Pictorial 609	The Case of the Missing Typist		Anon. (Cecil Hayter)		
The Penny Pictorial 610	On Information Received		Anon. (Cecil Hayter)		
The Penny Pictorial 611	A Case of Circumstantial Evidence		Anon. (E. Sempill aka M. Storm)		
The Penny Pictorial 612	The Problem of the Red Triangle		Anon. (Cecil Hayter)		
The Penny Pictorial 613	The Carven Wood Mystery		Anon. (E. Sempill aka M. Storm)		
The Penny Pictorial 614	The Tragedy of Ensdon Hill		Anon. (E. Sempill aka M. Storm)		
The Penny Pictorial 615	Jim's Revenge		Anon. (E. Sempill aka M. Storm)		
The Penny Pictorial 616	The Case of the Mysterious Cottage		Anon. (E. Sempill aka M. Storm)		
The Penny Pictorial 617	Fooled!		Anon. (E. Sempill aka M. Storm)		
The Penny Pictorial 618	The Tragedy of North Bank Mansions		Anon. (Cecil Hayter)		
The Penny Pictorial 620	The Saving Clue		Anon. (E. Sempill aka M. Storm)		
The Penny Pictorial 621	The Somerplace Murder Mystery		Anon. (E. Sempill aka M. Storm)		
The Penny Pictorial 622	The Stolen Cipher		Anon. (Cecil Hayter)		
The Penny Pictorial 623	The Chance of a Lifetime		Anon. (Cecil Hayter)		
The Penny Pictorial 624	The Helderstone Pearl Robbery		Anon. (Cecil Hayter)		
The Penny Pictorial 625	The Didwell Train Mystery		Anon. (E. Sempill aka M. Storm)		
The Penny Pictorial 626	The Mystery of the Stolen Tie-Pin		Anon. (Cecil Hayter)		
The Penny Pictorial 627	The Black Hand Mystery		Anon. (E. Sempill aka M. Storm)		
The Penny Pictorial 628	The Tythe End 'Bus Tragedy		Anon. (Cecil Hayter)		
The Penny Pictorial 629	The Princess Sophia's Escape		Anon. (Cecil Hayter)		
The Penny Pictorial 630	The Naseing Lock Mystery		Anon. (E. Sempill aka M. Storm)		
The Penny Pictorial 631	The Whitepool Pier Mystery		Anon. (E. Sempill aka M. Storm)		
The Penny Pictorial 632	The Mystery of the Stolen Banknotes		Anon. (Cecil Hayter)		
The Penny Pictorial 633	The Mystery of Box "B."		Anon. (E. Sempill aka M. Storm)		
The Penny Pictorial 634	The Forest Mystery		Anon. (Cecil Hayter)		
The Penny Pictorial 635	The Quinton Park Tragedy		Anon. (E. Sempill aka M. Storm)		
The Penny Pictorial 636	The Problem of the Missing Bride		Anon. (E. Sempill aka M. Storm)		
The Penny Pictorial 637	The Belder's Street Mystery		Anon. (E. Sempill aka M. Storm)		
The Penny Pictorial 638	The Up-River Mystery		Anon. (E. Sempill aka M. Storm)		
The Penny Pictorial 639	The Goona Pearl Mystery		Anon. (Cecil Hayter)		
The Penny Pictorial 640	The Wavemouth Tragedy		Anon. (E. Sempill aka M. Storm)		
The Penny Pictorial 641	The Temple Towers Mystery		Anon. (Cecil Hayter)		
The Penny Pictorial 642	The Case of the Brothwick Woods Murder		Anon. (Cecil Hayter)		
The Penny Pictorial 643	The Strand Cafe Tragedy		Anon. (Cecil Hayter)		
The Penny Pictorial 644	The Mystery of the Three Sovereigns		Anon. (Cecil Hayter)		
The Penny Pictorial 645	The Stolen "Madonna"		Anon. (E. Sempill aka M. Storm)		
The Penny Pictorial 646	The Colford Court Mystery		Anon. (Cecil Hayter)		
The Penny Pictorial 647	The Case of Nurse Knight		Anon. (E. Sempill aka M. Storm)		
The Penny Pictorial 648	The Case of the Missing Volume		Anon. (E. Sempill aka M. Storm)		
The Penny Pictorial 649	The Murder of Morton Geen		Anon. (Cecil Hayter)		
The Penny Pictorial 655	The Mystery of Paulton Towers		Anon. (Cecil Hayter)		
The Union Jack (2nd Series) 378	The White Man's Grave		Anon. (William Murray Graydon)		
The Union Jack (2nd Series) 379	Sexton Blake, Bandsman		Anon. (William Murray Graydon)		
The Union Jack (2nd Series) 380	The Squaw-Man		Anon. (William Murray Graydon)		
The Union Jack (2nd Series) 381	A1 at Lloyds		Anon. (A. C. Murray)		
The Union Jack (2nd Series) 382	The Mystery of Bleakmoor Prison		Anon. (Norman Goddard)		
The Union Jack (2nd Series) 383	The Wreck of the Scotch Express		Anon. (William Murray Graydon)		
The Union Jack (2nd Series) 384	By Order of the Board		Anon. (Norman Goddard)		
The Union Jack (2nd Series) 385	The Father of the Chapel		Anon. (J. G. Jones)		
The Union Jack (2nd Series) 386	Only an Alien		Anon. (Douglas Walshe)		
The Union Jack (2nd Series) 387	The Case of the Pirated Patterns		Anon. (Norman Goddard)		
The Union Jack (2nd Series) 388	Sexton Blake, Boxing Trainer		Anon. (Andrew Murray)		
The Union Jack (2nd Series) 389	On the Flood Tide		Anon. (William Murray Graydon)		
The Union Jack (2nd Series) 390	The Census Mystery		Anon. (Norman Goddard)		
The Union Jack (2nd Series) 391	The Affair of the Billiard Champion		Anon. (William J. Bayfield)		
The Union Jack (2nd Series) 392	The Last Hope		Anon. (William Murray Graydon)		
The Union Jack (2nd Series) 393	In the Shadow of the Plague		Anon. (William Murray Graydon)		
The Union Jack (2nd Series) 394	Sexton Blake — Station-Master		Anon. (E. W. Alais)		
The Union Jack (2nd Series) 395	A Soldier's Honour		Anon. (Andrew Murray)		
The Union Jack (2nd Series) 396	The Night Alarm		Anon. (A. C. Murray)		
The Union Jack (2nd Series) 397	The Problem of the Pageant		Anon. (William Murray Graydon)		
The Union Jack (2nd Series) 398	The Derby Winner		Anon. (A. C. Murray)		
The Union Jack (2nd Series) 399	A Double Thread		Anon. (W. J. Lomax)		
The Union Jack (2nd Series) 400	The Child-Beater		Anon. (William Murray Graydon)		
The Union Jack (2nd Series) 401	The Kidnapped Inspector		Anon. (Norman Goddard)		
The Union Jack (2nd Series) 402	Harold Roydon's Sacrifice		Anon. (William Murray Graydon)		
The Union Jack (2nd Series) 403	The Music-Hall Mystery		Anon. (Norman Goddard)		
The Union Jack (2nd Series) 404	The Flying Column		Anon. (Cecil Hayter)	Sir Richard Losely and Lobangu	
The Union Jack (2nd Series) 405	By Royal Warrant		Anon. (W. J. Lomax)		
The Union Jack (2nd Series) 406	Tinker's Big Plunge		Anon. (E. W. Alais)		
The Union Jack (2nd Series) 407	Under Canvas		Anon. (A. C. Murray)		
The Union Jack (2nd Series) 408	Sexton Blake, Yachtsman		Anon. (C. T. Baine)		
The Union Jack (2nd Series) 409	The Mystery of the Green Palanquin		Anon. (Andrew Murray)		
The Union Jack (2nd Series) 410	The Art Smuggler		Anon. (William Murray Graydon)		
The Union Jack (2nd Series) 411	Sexton Blake's Holiday Case		Anon. (J. G. Jones)		
The Union Jack (2nd Series) 412	The M.D. Mystery		Anon. (Norman Goddard)		
The Union Jack (2nd Series) 413	Sexton Blake – Strike Settler		Anon. (W. J. Lomax)		
The Union Jack (2nd Series) 414	The Alibi		Anon. (William Murray Graydon)		
The Union Jack (2nd Series) 415	The Death Tick		Anon. (Andrew Murray)		
The Union Jack (2nd Series) 416	Witness for the Defence		Anon. (E. J. Gannon)		
The Union Jack (2nd Series) 417	The Weighing-Room Mystery		Anon. (William J. Bayfield)		
The Union Jack (2nd Series) 418	The Secret of the Embassy		Anon. (E. J. Gannon)		
The Union Jack (2nd Series) 419	The Case of the Missing Million		Anon. (Andrew Murray)		
The Union Jack (2nd Series) 420	The Laboratory Mystery		Anon. (E. J. Gannon)		
The Union Jack (2nd Series) 421	The Great Poison Problem		Anon. (William Murray Graydon)		
The Union Jack (2nd Series) 422	During His Majesty's Pleasure		Anon. (William Murray Graydon)		
The Union Jack (2nd Series) 423	The Refugees		Anon. (William Murray Graydon)		
The Union Jack (2nd Series) 424	Sexton Blake – Hawker		Anon. (E. W. Alais)		
The Union Jack (2nd Series) 425	The Wandering Heir		Anon. (Andrew Murray)		
The Union Jack (2nd Series) 426	The Missing Missionary		Anon. (William Murray Graydon)		
The Union Jack (2nd Series) 427	The Rajah's Vow		Anon. (Ernest Brindle)		
The Union Jack (2nd Series) 428	A Christmas Tragedy		Anon. (William J. Bayfield)		
The Union Jack (2nd Series) 429	The Bullion Special		Anon. (Andrew Murray)		
