= Jack, Sam and Pete =

- A typical cover to The Marvel featuring Jack, Sam and Pete from No.866 (28 August 1920). Artist unidentified.

Group publication information
- Publisher: Amalgamated Press
- First appearance: The Halfpenny Marvel No.385 (March 1901)
- Created by: S. Clark Hooke

In-story information
- Member(s): Jack Owen; Sam Grant; Pete

Jack, Sam and Pete

Series publication information
- Schedule: Weekly
- Format: Text story
- Genre: Adventure
- Publication date: 1901 – 1922, 1927

Creative team
- Writer(s): S. Clark Hook; Walter Shute
- Artist(s): R. J. Macdonald; J. Abney Cummings
- Creator(s): S. Clark Hooke

Jack, Sam and Pete are fictional characters who starred in stories published in the Amalgamated Press boys' story paper The Halfpenny Marvel (later The Marvel) from 1901 to 1922.

It is an adventure story following a trio of globetrotting chums able to find excitement all over the world. The phenomenally strong Pete, a native of Zanzibar, befriends drifting Oxford graduate Jack Owen and American crack shot Sam Grant, who become his trusty companions; Pete soon proves to be a champion prize-fighter and the trio become travelling companions going to all sorts of places for boxing matches and other ventures. Pete's dog Rory was also a regular travelling companion.

== Publishing history ==
Created by S. Clarke Hook, the trio debuted in The Halfpenny Marvel on 30 March 1901, in No. 385. They soon became hugely popular with readers, making some thirty appearances over the next three years Nearly all of the stories featured spot illustrations by R. J. Macdonald. Val Reading, Willis Reading and Fred Bennett also contributed art to the stories.

Pete is sometimes referred to as the first black hero to appear in a British juvenile periodical; however, comics historian Denis Gifford has suggested the character of Chowgli debuted in the comic Illustrated Chips in 1899.

Jack, Sam & Pete's success was partly thanks to the stories' humour, but much of this is at the expense of Pete, who – despite his considerable wealth and physical prowess – was a minstrel stereotype, given to impulse and stupid reactions which leave Jack and Sam laughing at him. Such cheap use of black characters for humour reasons was sadly widespread in juvenile reading matter of the period, particularly that aimed at the working classes. Despite their success, the characters like many of their ilk, were not well received by many critics, and in one case the stories even found themselves cited as a bad influence on an eleven-year old pickpocket.

After the title was reinvented as a larger penny paper known simply as The Marvel in 1904, the trio would be the title's regulars, and appeared on the cover of the first relaunched issue. From the ninth issue the illustrations were taken over by J. Abney Cummings, who is considered the characters' definitive artist, and the characters became ever-present, with a long complete story featuring them in every issue of The Marvel from then until 1922. During this period Jack, Sam and Pete were household names, and even more famed than the likes of Sexton Blake and Greyfriars School. The characters were referenced in the latter, when Billy Bunter pirated one of their stories for inclusion in a school magazine, only to be rumbled by Marvel reader Harry Wharton. A later reprint changed this to a story from The Boys' Friend featuring "The Digger 'Tec".

The trio were so popular that in 1906 a library title was planned called The Jack, Sam and Pete Library, though from the second print run the title of The Boys' Friend Library was substituted. Nevertheless the group made regular appearances in the title, both in compilations from The Marvel and new stories; due to his weekly schedule Hook only wrote a few of their Boys' Friend Library appearances, with most being written by Walter Shute (under the pen name 'Gordon Maxwell'). Reprints of Jack, Sam and Pete's early escapades were included in the all-star line-up of The Penny Popular in 1912; these were rewritten to tone down the violence and add more humour in line with the contemporary stories then appearing in The Marvel.

The march of time saw the characters update their method of travel from ship to balloon to plane, while some stories featured a poorly-functioning 'Steam Man' – all purchased by Pete, whose boxing successes made the trio hugely wealthy. Another common device used was another of Pete's talents – he was an adept ventriloquist, though improbably when throwing his voice he used correct English rather than the pidgin dialogue he was usually given. Hook did not put much into his research of many locales, aware that the vast majority of his readers had never set foot in them.

One stunt during the run saw the characters eschew exotic locales in favour of visiting provincial towns suggested by readers. Jack, Sam and Pete would appear in a complete long story (usually around 12–14 pages) until 1922. The group were occasionally joined by another companion for a batch of stories – Huron chief Ira was one of these. Cummings died in 1917, around the same period that the group were joined by another new regular, a young boy named Algy. The latter was not popular with readers and began a slide for the characters, with Pete and Algy dominating the stories at the expense of Jack and Sam.

Hook's writing style also hadn't changed substantially since the 1890s and was beginning to look outdated to post-World War I readers. Even a series that sent Jack, Sam and Pete on tour with a football team failed to revive interest. Rather than move with the times, Hook opted to retire in 1922 – even receiving a pension from Amalgamated Press as a gesture of thanks for the sales his creations had generated in their prime. That January saw the story "Pete's Circus" ending with Jack, Sam and Pete deciding to go their separate ways for no discernible reason in an underwhelming end to the saga. The title itself did not last much longer.

Shute later made an attempt to revive the characters in 1927 for The Boys' Realm, though these were merely rewritten tales given some updated settings. Another attempt at a rival came in the 1930s in The Ranger, with Percy Clarke rewriting older stories as the adventures of 'Jim, Buck and Rastus'.

=== Film adaptation ===
Such was the group's fame at their peak that in 1919 the Daring-Pollock Company made a film based on the characters, named simply Jack, Sam and Pete, and set in the Wild West. They were played by Lieutenant Daring star Percy Moran (who also directed the movie), Eddie Willey and the pioneering Ernest Trimingham respectively.
