= The Boys' Realm =

British story paper for boys

- Editor: Hamilton Edwards (1902 – 1912); William H. Back (1912 – 1916); John Nix Pentalow (1919 – 1922)
- Categories: Story paper
- Frequency: Weekly
- First issue: 1902; 124 years ago
- Final issue: 1928
- Company: Amalgamated Press
- Country: United Kingdom
- Based in: London
- Language: English

The Boys' Realm was a British story paper for boys published by Alfred Harmsworth's Amalgamated Press. It was launched in 1902 as a companion paper to the Boys' Friend and remained in publication, with some interruptions, until the late 1920s. In all, 1231 issues were published over its three series run.

== Publication history ==
First Series (1902-1916)
June 6, 1902 - march 25, 1916 (717 issues)
The Boys' Realm was first published in 1902 on distinctive pink pages measuring 14 inches by 10 inches. It was priced at one penny and edited by Hamilton Edwards. The paper was part of a trio of successful boys' papers alongside the Boys' Friend and Boys' Herald. The first issue featured:

- "The Muff of Melthorpe College" by Allan Blair (front page)
- "The Quest of the Scarlet Star" by Reginald Wray
- "The Black Galley" by John Finnemore
- Various articles and editorial content

The paper became known for its strong focus on sports fiction, particularly football, cricket, and boxing stories. Notable sports serials included "The Blue Crusaders" by Arthur S. Hardy, which introduced one of the most memorable fictional football teams in boys' paper history.

War Interruption
Publication ceased on March 26, 1916, due to World War I constraints.

Second Series (1919-1927)
April 5, 1919 – June 16, 1927 (432 issues)
The paper resumed publication on April 5, 1919, under the editorship of John Nix Pentelow. While reduced to twelve pages from the original sixteen, it maintained its pink page format and penny price. The second series continued the paper's strong sporting focus, with Pentelow himself contributing cricket stories under the pen name Richard Randolph.

Third Series (1927-1928)
July 2, 1927 - February 9, 1929 (82 issues)
The final iteration began in July 1927 with a dramatic format change to match the size of the Magnet comic paper, featuring a white cover with red and blue printing. This series struggled to maintain the paper's former success and eventually transformed into "Boys' Realm of Fun and Fiction" before ceasing publication.

== Notable Contributors ==
Authors

- Arthur S. Hardy (sports fiction)
- David Goodwin (school stories)
- Charles Hamilton ("King Cricket" and other works)
- John Finnemore (Slapton School stories)
- Edwy Searles Brooks (St. Frank's stories)
- Andrew Nicholas Murray (sports stories as Captain Malcolm Arnold)
- Robert Murray Graydon (school serials as Robert Murray)
- Maxwell Scott (Nelson Lee tales and various serials)

Artists

- E.E. Briscoe (particularly known for sports illustrations)
- H.M. Lewis
- T.W. Holmes
- Fred Bennett
- Leonard Shields

== Content and Themes ==
The paper offered a combination of complete stories and serials. It was particularly noted for its:

- School stories
- Sports fiction (especially football and cricket)
- Adventure serials
- Military tales
- Editorial content and articles

== Legacy ==
The Boys' Realm remains significant in the history of British juvenile periodicals, particularly for its influence on sports fiction in boys' papers. The paper's "Blue Crusaders" stories created one of the most enduring fictional football teams in early 20th-century British juvenile literature.
