= Ernest Trimingham =

Bermudian actor and playwright (1880–1942)

Ernest Trimmingham (1880–1942), surname often misspelled as Trimingham, was a playwright, journalist, and actor on stage and screen from the British Overseas Territory of Bermuda. He was one of the first black actors in British cinema. Trimingham is a common surname in Bermuda connected with an affluent merchant family, and it is likely that Ernest adopted it when he became an actor. He was born in Bermuda in 1880, and died in England on 2 February 1942.

He wrote the play Lily of Bermuda staged by Duse Mohamed Ali in Manchester in 1909.

== Filmography ==
- The Adventures of Dick Turpin (1912), a British and Colonial Film Company release
- Jack, Sam and Pete (1919) as Pete

== See also ==
- Pete Hampton
