= The Boys' Friend =

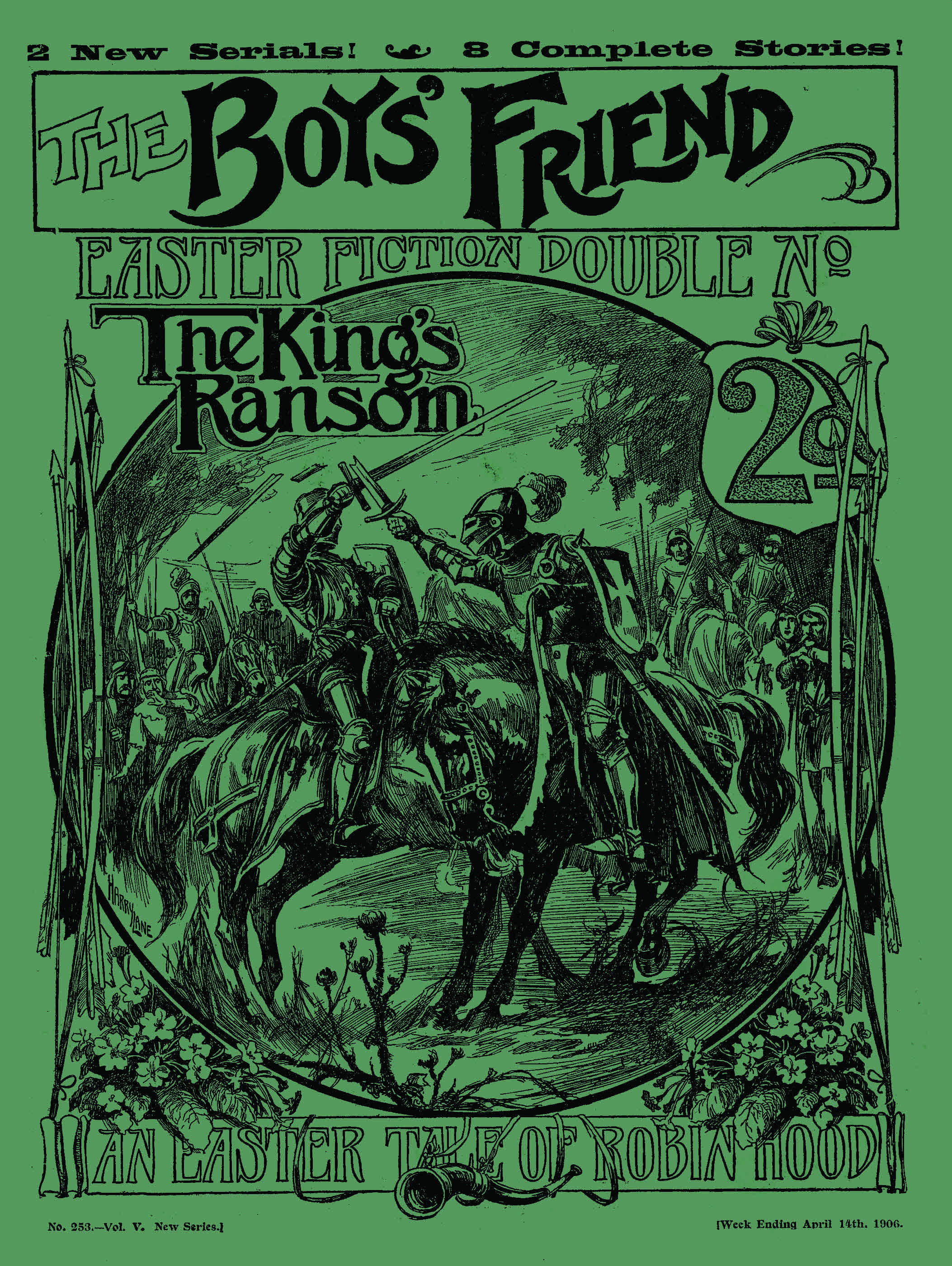
- Categories: Story paper
- Frequency: Weekly
- First issue: 1895; 130 years ago
- Final issue: 1927
- Company: Amalgamated Press
- Country: United Kingdom
- Based in: London
- Language: English

The Boys' Friend was a British story paper of the early 20th century, published by Amalgamated Press from 1895 to 1927.

== Overview ==
The Boys' Friend was a large, tabloid-sized story paper priced one penny (later 2d). It was produced by Amalgamated Press, and was part of Alfred Harmsworth's campaign to put the Penny Dreadfuls out of business. (Note: The legend on a cover scan states "To amuse, to instruct and to advise boys". The editorial also frequently condemned the "trashy papers", for instance in issue 113, Vol III (week ending Aug.8 1903).)

The paper generally contained 4-5 serial story installments, printed in very small text (the paper was 16 pages long). A 10,000 word complete story was also presented in each issue. The order of stories would be rotated so that each serial had an instalment on the cover (with accompanying large title and illustration). At other times the complete story would feature on the cover.

Sexton Blake; Foreman from The Boys' Friend (d. 1910)

The stories were typical of the Boys Own fare of the era, with adventure, detective and western stories predominating. Several Amalgamated Press characters such as Sexton Blake, Nelson Lee, Jack, Sam & Pete and Buffalo Bill appeared, in either serials or complete stories. Later issues featured stories of Jimmy Silver of Rookwood School, written by Charles Hamilton, creator of Billy Bunter.

The paper would also run an editorial page, mostly given over to the editor answering questions from readers, other short articles appeared in the paper, primarily concentrating on tips and facts revolving around sport, particularly football and cricket. Other articles on emigration to parts of the British Empire, and about life at sea, appeared frequently. (Note: Examples of all three in issue 124, Vol III (week ending Oct. 24, 1903).)

The Boys' Friend was the companion to The Boys' Herald and The Boys' Realm. (Note: Mentioned four times on the editor's page in Issue 118, Vol III (Week ending Sept. 12th, 1903).) It was printed on paper with a slight green tint, and was therefore referred to by collectors as "The green 'un". All three of the papers were served by the same writers: Sidney Drew, Maxwell Scott, Herbert Maxwell, S. Clark Hook, T.C. Bridges, Reginald Way, Henry Johnson, Alec G. Pearson, Henry St. Jon, John Tregellis, John Hunter, William Murray Graydon, Robert Leighton and Arthur S. Hardy.
