= The Boys' Herald =

- Editor: Hamilton Edwards
- Categories: Story paper
- Frequency: Weekly
- First issue: 1903; 122 years ago
- Final issue: 1912
- Company: Amalgamated Press
- Country: United Kingdom
- Based in: London
- Language: English

The Boys' Herald was a British boys' story paper published by the Amalgamated Press in the early 20th century. Launched in August 1903, it was the third in a trio of successful boys’ publications under the direction of Hamilton Edwards, following The Boys' Friend (1895) and The Boys' Realm (1902). The Boys' Herald was marketed as “A Healthy Paper for Manly Boys” and was notable for its white paper print, distinguishing it from its predecessors. It ran for 511 issues from August 8, 1903, until May 18, 1912.

== Origins and Format ==
In the early 1900s, Amalgamated Press dominated the British boys' periodical market, facing little competition as former publishing giants such as E.J. Brett and James Henderson waned. Under the leadership of Hamilton Edwards, the company had elevated The Boys' Friend to penny status in 1901, followed by the successful launch of The Boys’ Realm a year later. Recognizing the demand for additional weekly adventure and school stories, the company introduced Boys’ Herald in 1905, providing a mix of serialized fiction, standalone stories, articles, and editorial commentary.

The first issue featured three serials: The Seventh House of St. Basil's by Henry St. John, Wings of Gold by Sidney Drew, and Trapper Dan by George Manville Fenn. Fenn, known for his respectable boys' fiction, was likely included as a nod to Edwardian parents seeking quality reading material for their sons. However, after Trapper Dan concluded, Fenn's presence in the Boys’ Herald dwindled, while St. John and Drew became mainstays in its pages.

== Early Success and Notable Stories ==
The Boys' Herald quickly gained a readership, bolstered by the addition of a fourth serial, Nelson Lee's Pupil by Maxwell Scott, in its second issue. This story featuring popular detective Nelson Lee, introduced Nipper, his future assistant, a street-smart orphan who turned out to be the heir to a vast estate. Nipper became a beloved character and would later feature in numerous adventures, solidifying his place in British boys’ fiction history.

The first volume, spanning 52 issues, included notable serials such as Rajah Dick by David Goodwin and The New Master, a sequel to The Seventh House of St. Basil’s. The publication also featured double-number editions with full-colour covers, offering exceptional value for its twopence price tag. By its second year, the Boys’ Herald was considered by some to be at its peak; serialized stories included Afloat with Nelson by Henry St. John, On Turpin’s Highway by David Goodwin (a pen name for Sydney Gowing), and The Longbows of England by Morton Pike (a pen name for D. H. Parry).

Additionally, Football Foes by A. S. Hardy (an alias of Arthur Steffens) marked the paper's first significant foray into school football fiction, a genre that would later grow in popularity. Nipper’s Schooldays also emerged as a what was considered by some a landmark serial, setting the stage for his future escapades at St. Frank's recounted in The Nelson Lee Library.

Other notable authors include Herbert Maxwell, T.C. Bridges, Reginald Wray, Henry Johnson, Alec G. Pearson, John Hunter, William Murray Graydon, and Robert Leighton.

== Decline and Changes in Content ==
The quality of serials was perceived by some to have started to decline as newer, less experienced authors replaced established favourites. Suspenseful storytelling gave way to more hobby-oriented content, and an exchange and market section was introduced. Advertisers like Arthur Budge of Almondbury, Huddersfield, became well-known figures among readers.

Reprints became increasingly common, with serials such as Val, the Boy Acrobat by Claude Heathcote and The Boys of St. Basil’s by Henry St. John appearing again, albeit in altered settings. Writing in Story Paper Collectors' Digest, Herbert Leckenby felt the reissued versions lacked the charm and freshness of the originals.

Notably, Charles Hamilton contributed a short run of Cliveden School stories, which showcased his trademark style but did not become long-term fixtures.

== Final Years and Legacy ==
As its popularity waned, the Boys’ Herald struggled to maintain its former glory. After nearly a decade in print, the paper was discontinued, making way for Cheer Boys Cheer, a new title in a smaller, Magnet-style format with a brown cover. However, this successor failed to capture the same audience and lasted only a few months. A subsequent rebranding as Boys’ Journal fared little better.
