= Sexton Blake bibliography part 2: 1912–1945 =

List of cases featuring Fictional British detective Sexton Blake

Sexton Blake bibliography 1912–1945
- Author: George Hamilton Teed; Anthony Skene; Robert Murray Graydon; Andrew Nicholas Murray; Edwy Searles Brooks
- Country: United Kingdom
- Language: English
- Genre: Detective fiction
- Publisher: Amalgamated Press
- Media type: Story paper Comic books

Sexton Blake is a fictional detective who has been featured in many British comic strips, novels, and dramatic productions since 1893. He was featured in various British publications from 1893 to 1978 in a variety of formats: single-issue adventures, short stories, serials, and comic strips. In total, Blake appeared in more than 4,000 stories by over 200 different authors.

During its golden age (1920s–1940s), Blake's adventures were widely read and translated into at least twenty different languages, including Swedish, Norwegian, Finnish, Dutch, Spanish, German, Portuguese, Italian, French, Arabic, Hindi, and Afrikaans.

== Publication history ==
The first Sexton Blake story was "The Missing Millionaire". Written by Harry Blyth (using the pseudonym Hal Meredeth), it was published in The Halfpenny Marvel number 6, on 20 December 1893, a story paper owned by the Amalgamated Press. Blyth wrote six more Sexton Blake tales, three for the Marvel and three for The Union Jack a story paper launched in April 1894.

The Amalgamated Press purchased the copyright to Blake along with the first story Blyth had submitted and from 1895 onwards several authors began to pen Blake tales. From August 1905 Blake became the resident character in The Union Jack, appearing in every issue until its transformation into the Detective Weekly in 1933.

Blake's popularity began to grow during the Edwardian era, and he appeared in a number of different story papers. These appearances included serials in the tabloid sized Boys' Friend, complete tales in the pocket-sized Penny Pictorial, and short stores in Answers, one of the Amalgamated Press' most popular papers. Longer tales of 60,000 words or so appeared in The Boys' Friend Library and the success of these led to the creation of The Sexton Blake Library in 1915. This digest-sized publication specialized in longer tales, and at the height of its popularity was published 5 times a month. It ran for just under 50 years.

In 1959 Fleetway Publications acquired the rights to Sexton Blake adventures and published The Sexton Blake Library until the title's demise. The final tale, The Last Tiger, was published in June 1963.

In 1965, Blake editor William Howard Baker licensed the rights of the Sexton Blake character. He published the fifth series of The Sexton Blake Library independently via Mayflower-Dell Books, which ran until 1968. He then issued a final series of four Sexton Blake novels, using his Howard Baker Books imprint, in 1969. From 1968 to 1971 Valiant published new comic strips in the style of the Knockout strips from decades earlier. Blake's last original appearance was in Sexton Blake and the Demon God "a period thriller with ancient curses and cliff-hanger endings" in 1978.

There were a few anthologies and reprints in the 80s and 90s. In 2009 Wordsworth Books published the casebook of Sexton Blake and Snowbooks published Sexton Blake Detective. 2018 saw an uptick in Sexton Blake reprints, with the first print novels published by Stillwoods Publishing, a Canadian publisher out of Nova Scotia. In 2020 ROH Press began publishing Sexton Blake tales with Sexton Blake The Early Years, a collection of Blake's first cases. British publishers Rebellion Publishing produced four anthologies in 2020–21, each introduced by Blakeologist Mark Hodder.

== Compiling the Sexton Blake bibliography ==
The bibliography originated in the pages of Story Paper Collectors' Digest where collectors began recording and compiling the list of Blake tales that appeared in The Union Jack and The Sexton Blake Library. A master corpus was assembled in the late 1950s by The Sexton Blake Circle to facilitate the research of the Blake story papers.

Titles and authorship were verified from the archived records of the Amalgamated Press. As many of authors published in The Union Jack before 1929 were uncredited, the Sexton Blake Circle adopted the practice of accrediting authorship to the person who received payment for the tale until proven otherwise. Led by Len and Josie Packman expansion and revision on the master corpus was ongoing throughout the early 1960s as research brought more titles to light.

The Sexton Blake Catalogue was published in 1966. The announcement in Story Paper Collectors' Digest read:

"This long anticipated catalogue, prepared with loving care by members of the Sexton Blake Circle, is now awaiting you. It is a veritable encyclopaedia of Sexton Blake lore, listing all the titles, authors, and leading characters of the stories in The Union Jack and in The Sexton Blake Library from the very beginning till the present day. There is also a wealth of information on the Sexton Blake adventures which featured in other periodicals. Beautifully produced, it sums up to a magnificent job."

In 1970 Josie Packman announced a reprint of the Sexton Blake Catalogue along with a "supplement of all the new information."

In July 1971 its completion and availability was announced in the Collector's Digest with the following announcement:

FOR ALL SEXTON BLAKE FANS
The Supplement to the Sexton Blake Catalogue is now ready, containing all the information which was not to hand at the time the main Catalogue was first published. It contains all the titles in the most recent series of the Sexton Blake Library; information concerning all the Blake serials of years gone by; particulars of Blake as seen in stage plays and on the talking screen; titles of Blake stories in the rare Penny Pictorial and in Answers Library, plus information concerning the pre-war Sexton Blake Annuals.

Since publication the Catalogue and supplement have been considered an "invaluable" tool by researchers interested in the Blake canon. As Blake research was ongoing as new information or titles were discovered in primary sources, the catalogue was updated.

The catalogue provided verification that Sexton Blake had appeared in roughly 4000 tales by around 200 authors. Based on this statistic, Otto Penzler and Chris Steinbrunner writing in the Encyclopedia of Mystery and Detection concluded that Sexton Blake was the hero of more novels and stories than any other detective.

In 1993 the second edition of the Sexton Blake Catalogue was announced in honour of the detective's 100th birthday. The announcement read:

With over 120 pages of text and illustrations listing all the known appearances of the world's greatest detective in print, TV, radio and celluloid, this bibliography is a must for all collectors

It was issued by The Sexton Blake Library in Loughton, Essex.

Additions to the catalogue since 1993 have been made from publisher and retailer websites. ISBN numbers, where applicable, have been added to assist verification.

== The Sexton Blake bibliography parts 1 to 4 ==
Due to the extreme length of the bibliography it has been divided into four eras:

1893–1911: The Victorian/Edwardian Era Sexton Blake bibliography
1912–1945: The Master Criminals Era Sexton Blake bibliography part 2: 1912–1945
1946–1978: The Post War Era Sexton Blake bibliography part 3: 1946–1978
1979–present: Revivals and Republications: Sexton Blake bibliography part 4: 1979–present

== Notes to the cases ==
All authors have been listed and linked to their Wikipedia biographies where possible. Many of these authors are remembered nowadays for the adversaries they pitted against Blake or the femme fatales they introduced. Many of these popular characters and their appearances have been described and included as well as key incidents in the life of Sexton Blake.

== 1912 The era of the master criminals begins ==
Count Ivor Carlac, the second super villain in the Blake canon makes his debut. He quickly became one of the most popular characters in the Blake stories, rivalling George Marsden Plummer in popularity. Plummer and Carlac star in several tales throughout 1912, foreshadowing the master criminal era that began in 1913.

Publication	Title	Author	Key Characters	Notes
The Answers Library 85	The Man in the Train	Cecil Hayter		
The Boys' Friend 552–561	Tinker's Schooldays (part 16–25)	Anon. (Cecil Hayter)		26-part serial
The Boys' Friend 562	Tinker's Schooldays (part 26) Plus:Tinker's Schooldays: The Four Musketeers (part 1)	Anon. (Cecil Hayter)		26-part serial
The Boys' Friend 563–586	Tinker's Schooldays: The Four Musketeers (part 2–25)	Anon. (Cecil Hayter)		25-part serial
The Boys' Friend 589	The Figure in Black	Anon. (Cecil Hayter)		
The Boys' Friend 591	The Clue of the Finger-Prints	Anon. (Cecil Hayter)		
The Boys' Friend 595	The Agony Column Mystery	Anon. (Cecil Hayter)		
The Boys' Friend 599	The Kidnapped Ambassador	Anon. (Cecil Hayter)		
The Boys' Friend 602	Tinker's Holiday	Anon. (Cecil Hayter)		
The Boys' Friend Library 199	Sexton Blake, Spy	Anon. (William Murray Graydon)		
The Dreadnought 27–31	The Man from Scotland Yard (part 1–5)	Anon. (E. Sempill aka M. Storm)	George Marsden Plummer	The serialization of Plummer's debut tale.
The Penny Pictorial 658	The Wellington Theatre Mystery	Anon. (Cecil Hayter)		
The Penny Pictorial 660	The Salford Murder Mystery	Anon. (E. Sempill aka M. Storm)		
The Penny Pictorial 661	The Message in the Bottle	Anon. (Cecil Hayter)		
The Penny Pictorial 662	The Birmingham Mystery	Anon. (Cecil Hayter)		
The Penny Pictorial 663	The Clue of the Broken Bootlace	Anon. (E. Sempill aka M. Storm)		
The Penny Pictorial 665	The Marwell Mystery	Anon. (Cecil Hayter)		
The Penny Pictorial 666	The Mystery of Buckler's Mansions	Anon. (Cecil Hayter)		
The Penny Pictorial 669	The Stolen Submarine Plans	Anon. (Cecil Hayter)		
The Penny Pictorial 672	The Plymouth Motor-Car Mystery	Anon. (E. Sempill aka M. Storm)		
The Penny Pictorial 674	The Nottingham Murder	Anon. (Cecil Hayter)		
The Penny Pictorial 675	The Cardiff Mystery	Anon. (Cecil Hayter)		
The Penny Pictorial 676	The Robbery at Woolfredge's	Anon. (Cecil Hayter)		
The Penny Pictorial 679	The Horseshoe Murder	Anon. (Cecil Hayter)		
The Penny Pictorial 680	The "Wireless" Mystery	Anon. (Cecil Hayter)		
The Penny Pictorial 686	The Case of the Missing Pendant	Anon. (Cecil Hayter)		
The Penny Pictorial 699	The Tasker Larke Mystery	Anon. (Cecil Hayter)		
The Penny Pictorial 700	The Pink Tape Clue	Anon. (Cecil Hayter)		
The Penny Pictorial 702	The Thames-Norton Mystery	Anon. (Cecil Hayter)		
The Penny Pictorial 703	The Lost Lady Typist	Anon. (Cecil Hayter)		
The Penny Pictorial 707	Blackmail	Anon. (Cecil Hayter)		
The Penny Pictorial 708	The Tragedy of the Alps	Anon. (Cecil Hayter)		
The Penny Popular 1	The Case of the Treasure Hunters	Anon. (William Murray Graydon)		
The Penny Popular 2	Sexton Blake, Firefighter	Anon. (William Murray Graydon)		
The Penny Popular 3	The Smuggler Detective	Anon. (William Murray Graydon)		
The Penny Popular 4	The Four Thumb Prints	Anon. (William Murray Graydon)		
The Penny Popular 5	The Stolen Plan	Anon. (Norman Goddard)		
The Penny Popular 6	Sexton Blake, King's Messenger	Anon. (William Murray Graydon)		
The Penny Popular 7	The Missing Heir	Anon. (William Murray Graydon)		
The Penny Popular 8	The Lost Laird	Anon. (William Murray Graydon)		
The Penny Popular 9	A Dash for Freedom	Anon. (Norman Goddard)		
The Penny Popular 10	The Convict Detective	Anon. (E. W. Alais)		
The Penny Popular 11	The Order of Release	Anon. (Norman Goddard)		
The Penny Popular 12	The House of Mystery	Anon. (Cecily Hamilton)		
The Union Jack (2nd Series) 430	The Case of the Cinematograph Actor	Anon. (W. A. Williamson)		
The Union Jack (2nd Series) 431	The Motor-Bus Mystery	Anon. (Edwy Searles Brooks)		The debut of writer Edwy Searles Brooks. Brooks would eventually become the main writer of The Nelson Lee Library. He also created his own detective Norman Conquest.
The Union Jack (2nd Series) 432	The Publisher's Secret	Anon. (William Murray Graydon)	The Weasel	
The Union Jack (2nd Series) 433	The Football Swindlers	Anon. (Andrew Murray)		
The Union Jack (2nd Series) 434	The Shipyard Mystery	Anon. (Andrew Murray)		
The Union Jack (2nd Series) 435	Saved From the River	Anon. (E. J. Gannon)		
The Union Jack (2nd Series) 436	Leper Island	Anon. (Cecil Hayter)		
The Union Jack (2nd Series) 437	The Ruined Squire	Anon. (E. W. Alais)		
The Union Jack (2nd Series) 438	The Strike Pay Swindle	Anon. (Andrew Murray)		
The Union Jack (2nd Series) 439	The Case of the Anonymous Letters	Anon. (John W. Bobin)		
The Union Jack (2nd Series) 440	Sexton Blake: Music Hall Manager	Anon. (A. C. Murray)		
The Union Jack (2nd Series) 441	The Rival Advertisers	Anon. (W. A. Williamson)		
The Union Jack (2nd Series) 442	Afraid to Give Evidence	Anon. (E. J. Gannon)		
The Union Jack (2nd Series) 443	The Man of Many Aliases	Anon. (William Murray Graydon)		
The Union Jack (2nd Series) 444	The Case of the Woman Accomplice	Anon. (William Murray Graydon)		
The Union Jack (2nd Series) 445	Circumstantial Evidence	Anon. (Norman Goddard)		
The Union Jack (2nd Series) 446	The Coffee-Stall Mystery	Anon. (Edwy Searles Brooks)		
The Union Jack (2nd Series) 447	The Sign of 7	Anon. (E. W. Alais)		
The Union Jack (2nd Series) 448	The Cashiered Captain	Anon. (Norman Goddard)		
The Union Jack (2nd Series) 449	The Vineyard Mystery	Anon. (William Murray Graydon)		
The Union Jack (2nd Series) 450	The Solicitor's Secret	Anon. (William Murray Graydon)		
The Union Jack (2nd Series) 451	The Case of the Calcutta Sweepstake	Anon. (Norman Goddard)		
The Union Jack (2nd Series) 452	The Case of the Unclaimed Bank Balance	Anon. (William Murray Graydon)		
The Union Jack (2nd Series) 453	The Case of the Convict Millionaire	Anon. (Norman Goddard)	George Marsden Plummer, John Marsh, Detective Will Spearing	
The Union Jack (2nd Series) 454	The Case of the Newspaper Relief Fund	Anon. (Norman Goddard)	George Marsden Plummer, Detective Will Spearing	
The Union Jack (2nd Series) 455	The Notting Hill Mystery	Anon. (E. J. Gannon)		
The Union Jack (2nd Series) 456	The Blackmailer Detective	Anon. (Norman Goddard)	George Marsden Plummer, Detective-Inspector Lurgan	
The Union Jack (2nd Series) 457	The Case of the Olympic Champion	Anon. (J. G. Jones)		
The Union Jack (2nd Series) 458	The King's Prizeman	Anon. (Andrew Murray)		
The Union Jack (2nd Series) 459	The Brotherhood of Twelve	Anon. (Norman Goddard)	George Marsden Plummer, Detective Will Spearing	
The Union Jack (2nd Series) 460	The Masked Musicians	Anon. (E. W. Alais)		
The Union Jack (2nd Series) 461	The Case of the Colonial Cricketer	Anon. (Andrew Murray)		
The Union Jack (2nd Series) 462	The Great Charity Swindle	Anon. (Norman Goddard)	George Marsden Plummer	
The Union Jack (2nd Series) 463	In the Shadow of Siberia	Anon. (Andrew Murray)		
The Union Jack (2nd Series) 464	The Law of the Sea	Anon. (William Murray Graydon)		
The Union Jack (2nd Series) 465	The Secret Slaves	Anon. (Norman Goddard)	George Marsden Plummer, Detective Will Spearing	
The Union Jack (2nd Series) 466	The Rival Doctors	Anon. (William J. Bayfield)		
The Union Jack (2nd Series) 467	Sexton Blake, Laundryman	Anon. (E. W. Alais)		
The Union Jack (2nd Series) 468	The Regent Street Robbery	Anon. (Andrew Murray)	Count Ivor Carlac makes his debut.	The second of the Blake master villains. Carlac of "huge physical proportions and ruthless methods". He quickly became popular and featured in four different Blake publications.
The Union Jack (2nd Series) 469	The Heir from Texas	Anon. (Norman Goddard)	George Marsden Plummer, John Marsh, Detective Will Spearing	
The Union Jack (2nd Series) 470	The Case of the Borgia Bronze	Anon. (Andrew Murray)	Count Ivor Carlac	
The Union Jack (2nd Series) 471	A Case of Graft	Anon. (Norman Goddard)	George Marsden Plummer	
The Union Jack (2nd Series) 472	The Opium Smugglers	Anon. (Andrew Murray)	Count Ivor Carlac	
The Union Jack (2nd Series) 473	The Great Bank Fraud	Anon. (Norman Goddard)	George Marsden Plummer, Detective-Inspector Lurgan	
The Union Jack (2nd Series) 474	Carlac: Gun-Runner	Anon. (Andrew Murray)	Count Ivor Carlac	
The Union Jack (2nd Series) 475	The Case of the 500,000 Loan	Anon. (Norman Goddard)	George Marsden Plummer	
The Union Jack (2nd Series) 476	The Great Turf Mystery	Anon. (Norman Goddard)	George Marsden Plummer	
The Union Jack (2nd Series) 477	Dead Men's Shoes	Anon. (George Hamilton Teed)		George Hamilton Teed makes his debut. Teed wrote 299 Blake tales over the course of his 25-year career, more than any other author.
The Union Jack (2nd Series) 478	The Mad Millionaire; or, Delivered from Evil	Anon. (Andrew Murray)	Count Ivor Carlac	Christmas Double Issue
The Union Jack (2nd Series) 479	The Case of the Balkan War Correspondent	Anon. (William Murray Graydon)		
The Union Jack (2nd Series) 480	The Price of Silence	Anon. (Norman Goddard)	George Marsden Plummer	
The Union Jack (2nd Series) 481	A Christmas Conspiracy	Anon. (William J. Bayfield)		

== 1913 ==
The dawn of Blake's Golden Age. The era of the master criminals begins. Andrew Murray creates Professor Kew and George Hamilton Teed creates Mademoiselle Yvonne Cartier, Dr Huxton Rymer and Prince Wu Ling.

Publication	Title	Author	Key Characters	Notes
The Boys' Friend 628	Tinker Abroad	Anon. (Cecil Hayter)		
The Boys' Friend 648	The Fifth at Telford	Anon. (Cecil Hayter)		
The Boys' Friend 650	Little Tinker's Visitor	Anon. (Cecil Hayter)		
The Boys' Friend 652	Tinker's Fig Pudding	Anon. (Cecil Hayter)		
The Boys' Friend 654	Tinker's Tango Tea	Anon. (Cecil Hayter)		
The Boys' Friend Library 228	The Great Mining Swindle	Anon. (George Hamilton Teed)	Dr. Huxton Rymer	Dr. Huxton Rymer's second solo tale. The tale picks up immediately after the events narrated in The Diamond Dragon. Teed sets the action in his native New Brunswick.
The Boys' Friend Library 229	Tinker's Schooldays	Anon. (Cecil Hayter)		
The Boys' Friend Library 232	Tinker's Schooldays: The Four Musketeers	Anon. (Cecil Hayter)		
The Boys' Friend Library 246	The Slave Market / Sexton Blake's Zulu	Anon. (Cecil Hayter)		
The Boys' Friend Library 248	The Ghost of Rupert Forbes	Anon. (E. Sempill aka M. Storm)		
The Boys' Realm 600	The Great Hotel Mystery	Anon. (E. J. Gannon)		
The Dreadnought 32–34	The Man from Scotland Yard (part 6–8)	Anon. (E. Sempill aka M. Storm)		Serial
The Dreadnought 35–42	The Man of Many Disguises (part 1–8)	Anon. (E. Sempill aka M. Storm)		8-part serial
The Dreadnought 43–49	The Man Who Vanished (part 1–7)	Anon. (E. Sempill aka M. Storm)		7-part serial
The Dreadnought 61–67	The Great Conspiracy (part 1–7)	Anon. (Norman Goddard)		9-part serial
The Dreadnought 68	The Men Who Changed Places (part 1) Plus: The Great Conspiracy (part 8)	Anon. (E. W. Alais) Anon. (Norman Goddard)		
The Dreadnought 69	The Men Who Changed Places (part 2) Plus: The Great Conspiracy (part 9)	Anon. (E. W. Alais) Anon. (Norman Goddard)		
The Dreadnought 70–83	The Men Who Changed Places (part 3)	Anon. (E. W. Alais)		16-part serial
The Penny Pictorial 711	The Man in the Train	Anon. (Unknown)		
The Penny Pictorial 712	The Marfield Jewel Mystery	Anon. (Unknown)		
The Penny Pictorial 714	The Cleyton Mystery	Anon. (Unknown)		
The Penny Pictorial 715	When Greek Meets Greek	Anon. (Unknown)		
The Penny Pictorial 718	The Ambrose Towers Mystery	Anon. (Unknown)		
The Penny Pictorial 719	Saved by a Hair	Anon. (Unknown)		
The Penny Pictorial 721	The Elvira Mystery	Anon. (Unknown)		
The Penny Pictorial 725	A Simple Case	Anon. (Unknown)		
The Penny Pictorial 731	The Brandon Meadows Mystery	Anon. (Unknown)		
The Penny Pictorial 737	A Holiday Case	Anon. (Unknown)		
The Penny Pictorial 754	The Clue of the Footprints	Anon. (Unknown)		
The Penny Pictorial 755	The Rolt Green Motor Mystery	Anon. (Unknown)		
The Penny Pictorial 756	The Mystery of the Golden God	Anon. (Unknown)		
The Penny Pictorial 757	The Locked Door	Anon. (Unknown)		
The Penny Pictorial 759	Quits at Last!	Anon. (Unknown)		
The Penny Pictorial 760	A Christmas Eve Mystery	Anon. (Unknown)		
The Penny Popular 13	The Mystery of Room No. 77	Anon. (A. G. Pearson)		
The Penny Popular 14	Sexton Blake, Man o' War's Man	Anon. (A. G. Pearson)		
The Penny Popular 15	The Redskin Detective	Anon. (William Murray Graydon)		
The Penny Popular 16	The Showman Detective	Anon. (Cecily Hamilton)		
The Penny Popular 17	500 Reward	Anon. (Norman Goddard)		
The Penny Popular 18	Lord Vancourt's Luck	Anon. (E. J. Gannon)		
The Penny Popular 19	The Newspaper Detective	Anon. (William Shaw Rae)		
The Penny Popular 20	The Master Hand	Anon. (Norman Goddard)		
The Penny Popular 21	The Anarchist Tracker	Anon. (Norman Goddard)		
The Penny Popular 22	The Mystery Cab	Anon. (W. B. Home-Gall)		
The Penny Popular 23	The Stolen Bloodhound	Anon. (William Murray Graydon)		
The Penny Popular 24	Sexton Blake, Pitman	Anon. (William Shaw Rae)		
The Penny Popular 25	On the Halls	Anon. (F. H. Evans)		
The Penny Popular 26	Brother Detectives	Anon. (Norman Goddard)		
The Penny Popular 27	Sexton Blake's Wager	Anon. (E. J. Gannon)		
The Penny Popular 28	The Rajah's Bodyguard	Anon. (William Murray Graydon)		
The Penny Popular 29	Sexton Blake's Jewel Hunt	Anon. (Cecily Hamilton)		
The Penny Popular 30	In the Kaiser's Service	Anon. (Norman Goddard)		
The Penny Popular 31	Sexton Blake's Mission	Anon. (Norman Goddard)		
The Penny Popular 32	The Prodigal's Pride	Anon. (E. J. Gannon)		
The Penny Popular 33	The Secret of the Glacier	Anon. (Cecily Hamilton)		
The Penny Popular 34	The Man in Possession	Anon. (Norman Goddard)		
The Penny Popular 35	The Long Lane Mystery	Anon. (Norman Goddard)		
The Penny Popular 36	The Missing Treaty	Anon. (E. W. Alais)		
The Penny Popular 37	Sexton Blake on 'Change	Anon. (A. C. Murray)		
The Penny Popular 38	The Picture Stealers	Anon. (A. S. Hardy)		
The Penny Popular 39	Count Navani's Coup	Anon. (Norman Goddard)		
The Penny Popular 40	The President Detective	Anon. (E. H. Burrage)		
The Penny Popular 41	Counterfeit Coin	Anon. (A. S. Hardy)		
The Penny Popular 42	Stars of the Opera	Anon. (William Murray Graydon)		
The Penny Popular 43	The Ghost of Ashleigh Dene	Anon. (Cecily Hamilton)		
The Penny Popular 44	Checkmated	Anon. (Cecily Hamilton)		
The Penny Popular 45	Sexton Blake, Lumberjack	Anon. (Norman Goddard)		
The Penny Popular 46	The Master Cheat	Anon. (W. J. Lomax)		
The Penny Popular 47	By the King's Command	Anon. (William Murray Graydon)		
The Penny Popular 48	The Wilmingham Gang	Anon. (Cecily Hamilton)		
The Penny Popular 49	At Grips With the Law	Anon. (Norman Goddard)		
The Penny Popular 50	Hunter, & Hunted Too	Anon. (E. Sempill aka M. Storm)		
The Penny Popular 51	The Fighting Detective	Anon. (Norman Goddard)		
The Penny Popular 52	The Haunted Man	Anon. (Harold Blyth)		
The Penny Popular 53	The Missing Champion	Anon. (A. S. Hardy)		
The Penny Popular 54	In the Czar's Domain	Anon. (E. J. Gannon)		
The Penny Popular 55	The Frontier Smugglers	Anon. (E. J. Gannon)		
The Penny Popular 56	Tricking the Turk	Anon. (William Murray Graydon)		
The Penny Popular 57	The Kidnapped Heir	Anon. (William Murray Graydon)		
The Penny Popular 58	A Kingdom at Stake	Anon. (E. J. Gannon)		
The Penny Popular 59	The Secret of the Dale	Anon. (G. Anderson)		
The Penny Popular 60	The Prince's Ordeal	Anon. (Norman Goddard)		
The Penny Popular 61	By Order of Chancery	Anon. (William Murray Graydon)		
The Penny Popular 62	His Last Card	Anon. (W. J. Lomax)		
The Penny Popular 63	Sexton Blake's Resolve	Anon. (Norman Goddard)		
The Penny Popular 64	The Slate Club Swindler	Anon. (Norman Goddard)		
The Union Jack (2nd Series) 482	The Great Diary Mystery	Anon. (E. J. Gannon)		
The Union Jack (2nd Series) 483	The Great Boxing Fraud	Anon. (Andrew Murray)	Count Ivor Carlac	
The Union Jack (2nd Series) 484	The Secret of Bleakmoor Prison	Anon. (Lewis Carlton)		
The Union Jack (2nd Series) 485	Beyond Reach of the Law	Anon. (George Hamilton Teed)	Yvonne Cartier	Yvonne Cartier makes her debut. The first of an 8-part series known as Yvonne's Vengeance.
The Union Jack (2nd Series) 486	The Ten Millionaires	Anon. (Andrew Murray)	Count Ivor Carlac	
The Union Jack (2nd Series) 487	PC Plummer v Sexton Blake Detective	Anon. (Lewis Carlton)	George Marsden Plummer	
The Union Jack (2nd Series) 488	When Greek Meets Greek	Anon. (George Hamilton Teed)	Yvonne Cartier and Dr. Huxton Rymer	Dr Huxton Rymer makes his first appearance in a Sexton Blake tale.
The Union Jack (2nd Series) 489	The Case of the Emigrant Slaves	Anon. (Andrew Murray)	Count Ivor Carlac	
The Union Jack (2nd Series) 490	Plummer in Society	Anon. (Lewis Carlton)	George Marsden Plummer	
The Union Jack (2nd Series) 491	Plummer's Gambling Den	Anon. (Lewis Carlton)	George Marsden Plummer	
The Union Jack (2nd Series) 492	On the Brink of Ruin	Anon. (George Hamilton Teed)	Yvonne Cartier	
The Union Jack (2nd Series) 493	The Diamond Dragon	Anon. (George Hamilton Teed)	Dr. Huxton Rymer	Rymer is in Melbourne following the evens of When Greek Meets Greek.
The Union Jack (2nd Series) 494	A Rogue at Large	Anon. (Andrew Murray)		
The Union Jack (2nd Series) 495	Settling Day	Anon. (George Hamilton Teed)	Yvonne Cartier	
The Union Jack (2nd Series) 496	The Arbitration Swindle	Anon. (Lewis Carlton)		
The Union Jack (2nd Series) 497	The Wandering Baronet	Anon. (Andrew Murray)		
The Union Jack (2nd Series) 498	A Minister of the Crown	Anon. (George Hamilton Teed)	Yvonne Cartier	
The Union Jack (2nd Series) 499	The Welsher	Anon. (Lewis Carlton)		
The Union Jack (2nd Series) 500	The Sugar Planter's Secret	Anon. (Andrew Murray)	Count Ivor Carlac	
The Union Jack (2nd Series) 501	The Detective Airman	Anon. (George Hamilton Teed)	Yvonne Cartier	
The Union Jack (2nd Series) 502	The Great Safe Mystery	Anon. (Lewis Carlton)	George Marsden Plummer	
The Union Jack (2nd Series) 503	The Case of the Suffragette Raid	Anon. (Andrew Murray)	Count Ivor Carlac	
The Union Jack (2nd Series) 504	The Long Trail	Anon. (Cecil Hayter)	Lobangu	
The Union Jack (2nd Series) 505	The Missing Guests	Anon. (George Hamilton Teed)	Yvonne Cartier	
The Union Jack (2nd Series) 506	The Ex-Convict's Secret	Anon. (Andrew Murray)		
The Union Jack (2nd Series) 507	The Brotherhood of the Yellow Beetle	Anon. (George Hamilton Teed)	Prince Wu Ling	
The Union Jack (2nd Series) 508	The Case of the Family Feud	Anon. (E. W. Alais)		
The Union Jack (2nd Series) 509	By Right of Possession	Anon. (George Hamilton Teed)	Yvonne Cartier	This marks the end of the Yvonne's Vengeance series.
The Union Jack (2nd Series) 510	The Idol's Spell	Anon. (George Hamilton Teed)	Prince Wu Ling	
The Union Jack (2nd Series) 511	The Aylesbury Square Mystery	Anon. (Andrew Murray)	Professor Francis Kew	
The Union Jack (2nd Series) 512	The Yellow Sphinx	Anon. (George Hamilton Teed)	Prince Wu Ling, Dr. Huxton Rymer, Yvonne Cartier	Double Issue
The Union Jack (2nd Series) 513	The Cowboy Detective	Anon. (Norman Goddard)		
The Union Jack (2nd Series) 514	Foiled by Sexton Blake	Anon. (Andrew Murray)	Professor Francis Kew	
The Union Jack (2nd Series) 515	The Great Hotel Mystery	Anon. (E. J. Gannon)		
The Union Jack (2nd Series) 516	The Crooks From America	Anon. (Norman Goddard)		
The Union Jack (2nd Series) 517	The Secret Report	Anon. (John William Staniforth)	The Scorpion	
The Union Jack (2nd Series) 518	The Black Jewel Case	Anon. (George Hamilton Teed)	Yvonne Cartier	
The Union Jack (2nd Series) 519	The White Mandarin	Anon. (George Hamilton Teed)	Prince Wu Ling	
The Union Jack (2nd Series) 520	The Case of the Motor Cyclist	Anon. (Andrew Murray)	Professor Francis Kew	
The Union Jack (2nd Series) 521	The Missing Heiress	Anon. (John William Staniforth)	The Scorpion	
The Union Jack (2nd Series) 522	The Cattle Thief	Anon. (Norman Goddard)		
The Union Jack (2nd Series) 523	The Captain of the Camel Corps	Anon. (Andrew Murray)		
The Union Jack (2nd Series) 524	The Trail of The Snake	Anon. (H. E. Inman)		
The Union Jack (2nd Series) 525	Tinker's Terrible Test	Anon. (Andrew Murray)	Professor Francis Kew	
The Union Jack (2nd Series) 526	The Yellow Octopus	Anon. (George Hamilton Teed)	Prince Wu Ling, Dr. Huxton Rymer	
The Union Jack (2nd Series) 527	Won by a Short Head	Anon. (H. E. Inman)		
The Union Jack (2nd Series) 528	The Mystery of Walla-Walla	Anon. (George Hamilton Teed)	Yvonne Cartier	Yvonne Cartier returns to Australia to win back her family home.
The Union Jack (2nd Series) 529	The Sacred Sphere	Anon. (George Hamilton Teed)	Yvonne Cartier, Prince Wu Ling, Dr. Huxton Rymer	Christmas Double Issue
The Union Jack (2nd Series) 530	The Gold Seekers	Anon. (Norman Goddard)		
The Union Jack (2nd Series) 531	The Blackmailer's Secret	Anon. (Andrew Murray)		
The Union Jack (2nd Series) 532	The Case of the Petrol Substitute	Anon. (H. E. Inman)		
The Union Jack (2nd Series) 533	A Yuletide Vow	Anon. (William Murray Graydon)		

== 1914 ==
Publication	Title	Author	Key Characters	Notes
The Boys' Friend 657	A Waxy Affair	Anon. (Cecil Hayter)		
The Boys' Journal 57	The Mystery of the Diamond Belt (part 1)	Lewis Carlton		
The Boys' Journal 58	The Mystery of the Diamond Belt (part 2)	Lewis Carlton		
The Boys' Journal 59	The Mystery of the Diamond Belt (part 3)	Lewis Carlton		
The Boys' Journal 60	The Mystery of the Diamond Belt (part 4)	Lewis Carlton		
The Boys' Journal 61	The Mystery of the Diamond Belt (part 5)	Lewis Carlton		
The Boys' Journal 62	The Mystery of the Diamond Belt (part 6)	Lewis Carlton		
The Boys' Journal 63	The Mystery of the Diamond Belt (part 7)	Lewis Carlton		
The Boys' Journal 64	The Mystery of the Diamond Belt (part 8)	Lewis Carlton		
The Boys' Journal 65	The Mystery of the Diamond Belt (part 9)	Lewis Carlton		
The Boys' Journal 66	The Mystery of the Diamond Belt (part 10)	Lewis Carlton		
The Boys' Journal 67	The Mystery of the Diamond Belt (part 11)	Lewis Carlton		
The Dreadnought 84	The Heir From Nowhere (part 1); Plus:The Men Who Changed Places (part 17)	Anon. (Edwy Searles Brooks)		
The Dreadnought 85	The Heir From Nowhere (part 2)	Anon. (Edwy Searles Brooks)		
The Dreadnought 86	The Heir From Nowhere (part 3)	Anon. (Edwy Searles Brooks)		
The Dreadnought 87	The Heir From Nowhere (part 4)	Anon. (Edwy Searles Brooks)		
The Dreadnought 88	The Heir From Nowhere (part 5)	Anon. (Edwy Searles Brooks)		
The Dreadnought 89	The Heir From Nowhere (part 6)	Anon. (Edwy Searles Brooks)		
The Dreadnought 90	The Heir From Nowhere (part 7)	Anon. (Edwy Searles Brooks)		
The Dreadnought 91	The Heir From Nowhere (part 8)	Anon. (Edwy Searles Brooks)		
The Dreadnought 92	The Heir From Nowhere (part 9)	Anon. (Edwy Searles Brooks)		
The Dreadnought 93	The Heir From Nowhere (part 10)	Anon. (Edwy Searles Brooks)		
The Dreadnought 94	The Heir From Nowhere (part 11)	Anon. (Edwy Searles Brooks)		
The Dreadnought 95	The Heir From Nowhere (part 12)	Anon. (Edwy Searles Brooks)		
The Dreadnought 96	The Heir From Nowhere (part 13)	Anon. (Edwy Searles Brooks)		
The Dreadnought 97	The Man of Mystery (part 1); Plus: The Heir From Nowhere (part 14)	Anon. (Unknown)		
The Dreadnought 98	The Man of Mystery (part 2); Plus: The Heir From Nowhere (part 15)	Anon. (Unknown)		
The Dreadnought 99	The Man of Mystery (part 3)	Anon. (Unknown)		
The Dreadnought 100	The Man of Mystery (part 4)	Anon. (Unknown)		
The Dreadnought 101	The Man of Mystery (part 5)	Anon. (Unknown)		
The Dreadnought 102	The Man of Mystery (part 6)	Anon. (Unknown)		
The Dreadnought 103	The Man of Mystery (part 7)	Anon. (Unknown)		
The Dreadnought 104	The Man of Mystery (part 8)	Anon. (Unknown)		
The Dreadnought 105	The Man of Mystery (part 9)	Anon. (Unknown)		
The Dreadnought 106	The Man of Mystery (part 10)	Anon. (Unknown)		
The Dreadnought 107	The Man of Mystery (part 11)	Anon. (Unknown)		
The Dreadnought 108	The Mystery of the Scarlet Thread (part 1)	Anon. (Unknown)		
The Dreadnought 109	The Mystery of the Scarlet Thread (part 2)	Anon. (Unknown)		
The Dreadnought 110	The Mystery of the Scarlet Thread (part 3)	Anon. (Unknown)		
The Dreadnought 111	The Mystery of the Scarlet Thread (part 4)	Anon. (Unknown)		
The Dreadnought 112	The Mystery of the Scarlet Thread (part 5)	Anon. (Unknown)		
The Dreadnought 113	The Mystery of the Scarlet Thread (part 6)	Anon. (Unknown)		
The Dreadnought 114	The Mystery of the Scarlet Thread (part 7)	Anon. (Unknown)		
The Dreadnought 115	The Mystery of the Yellow Button (part 1)	Anon. (E. Sempill aka M. Storm)		
The Dreadnought 116	The Mystery of the Yellow Button (part 2)	Anon. (E. Sempill aka M. Storm)		
The Dreadnought 117	The Mystery of the Yellow Button (part 3)	Anon. (E. Sempill aka M. Storm)		
The Dreadnought 118	The Mystery of the Yellow Button (part 4)	Anon. (E. Sempill aka M. Storm)		
The Dreadnought 119	The Mystery of the Yellow Button (part 5)	Anon. (E. Sempill aka M. Storm)		
The Dreadnought 120	The Mystery of the Yellow Button (part 6)	Anon. (E. Sempill aka M. Storm)		
The Dreadnought 121	The Mystery of the Yellow Button (part 7)	Anon. (E. Sempill aka M. Storm)		
The Dreadnought 1	The Mystery of the Yellow Button (part 8)	Anon. (E. Sempill aka M. Storm)		
The Dreadnought 2	The Mystery of the Yellow Button (part 9)	Anon. (E. Sempill aka M. Storm)		
The Dreadnought 3	The Mystery of the Yellow Button (part 10); Plus: The Redskin Detective (part 1)	Anon. (E. Sempill aka M. Storm); Anon. (W. J. Lomax)		
The Dreadnought 4	The Redskin Detective (part 2)	Anon. (W. J. Lomax)		
The Dreadnought 5	The Redskin Detective (part 3)	Anon. (W. J. Lomax)		
The Dreadnought 6	The Redskin Detective (part 4)	Anon. (W. J. Lomax)		
The Dreadnought 7	The Redskin Detective (part 5)	Anon. (W. J. Lomax)		
The Dreadnought 8	The Redskin Detective (part 6)	Anon. (W. J. Lomax)		
The Dreadnought 9	The Redskin Detective (part 7)	Anon. (W. J. Lomax)		
The Dreadnought 10	The Redskin Detective (part 8)	Anon. (W. J. Lomax)		
The Dreadnought 11	The Redskin Detective (part 9)	Anon. (W. J. Lomax)		
The Dreadnought 12	The Redskin Detective (part 10)	Anon. (W. J. Lomax)		
The Dreadnought 13	The Secret Plotter (part 1)	Anon. (W. J. Lomax)		
The Dreadnought 14	The Secret Plotter (part 2)	Anon. (W. J. Lomax)		
The Penny Popular 65	Gambling with Fate	Anon. (Norman Goddard)		
The Penny Popular 66	The Haunted Priory	Anon. (William Shaw Rae)		
The Penny Popular 67	The Clansmen's Feud	Anon. (W. J. Lomax)		
The Penny Popular 68	The Cigarette Clue	Anon. (William Shaw Rae)		
The Penny Popular 69	Sexton Blake's Strange Quest	Anon. (William Shaw Rae)		
The Penny Popular 70	Proved Innocent	Anon. Anon. (A. S. Hardy)		
The Penny Popular 71	The Fenfield Conspiracy	Anon. (William Shaw Rae)		
The Penny Popular 72	The Mystery Man	Anon. (William Shaw Rae)		
The Penny Popular 73	The Fortune Stone	Anon. (William Shaw Rae)		
The Penny Popular 74	The Changed Eyes	Anon. (A. Grahame)		
The Penny Popular 75	Twice Cleared	Anon. (P. Cooke)		
The Penny Popular 76	The Forger	Anon. (William Shaw Rae)		
The Penny Popular 77	Tracked Across the World	Anon. (Unknown)		
The Penny Popular 78	Sexton Blake's Ruse	Anon. (William Shaw Rae)		
The Penny Popular 79	Squire Tredgar's Secret	Anon. (G. Anderson)		
The Penny Popular 80	The Doctor's Dupe	Anon. (W. J. Lomax)		
The Penny Popular 81	The Living Picture	Anon. (William Shaw Rae)		
The Penny Popular 82	In Deep Waters	Anon. (E. J. Gannon)		
The Penny Popular 83	An International Affair	Anon. (E. J. Gannon)		
The Penny Popular 84	A Diplomatic Triangle	Anon. (W. J. Lomax)		
The Penny Popular 85	High Treason	Anon. (W. J. Lomax)		
The Penny Popular 86	Transported for Life	Anon. (A. S. Hardy)		
The Penny Popular 87	A Struggle for Liberty	Anon. (A. S. Hardy)		
The Penny Popular 88	Tinker's Peril	Anon. (W. J. Lomax)		
The Penny Popular 89	The Plot That Failed	Anon. (W. J. Lomax)		
The Penny Popular 90	A Perilous Quest	Anon. (Edgar Pickering)		
The Penny Popular 91	Against Heavy Odds	Anon. (Edgar Pickering)		
The Penny Popular 92	A Forlorn Hope	Anon. (William Murray Graydon)		
The Penny Popular 93	The Horror of Hayti	Anon. (William Murray Graydon)		
The Penny Popular 94	Luck Loring's Loss	Anon. (G. Carr)		
The Penny Popular 95	The Serpent Worshippers	Anon. (G. Carr)		
The Penny Popular 96	Sexton Blake's Holiday Case	Anon. (E. W. Alais)		
The Penny Popular 97	The Circus Mystery	Anon. (E. W. Alais)		
The Penny Popular 98	At Grips With the Apaches	Anon. (William Murray Graydon)		
The Penny Popular 99	The Hostage	Anon. (William Murray Graydon)		
The Penny Popular 100	The Message from the Sea	Anon. (Unknown)		
The Penny Popular 101	The Imperial Spy	Anon. (Norman Goddard)		
The Penny Popular 102	The Kaiser's Ransom	Anon. (Norman Goddard)		
The Penny Popular 103	A Friend's Disgrace	Anon. (Norman Goddard)		
The Penny Popular 104	A Fight for Honour	Anon. (Norman Goddard)		
The Penny Popular 105	The Walking Cracksman	Anon. (E. W. Alais)		
The Penny Popular 106	Sexton Blake on Tramp	Anon. (E. W. Alais)		
The Penny Popular 107	The Black Country Mystery	Anon. (William J. Bayfield)		
The Penny Popular 108	Sexton Blake's Blunder	Anon. (A. S. Hardy)		
The Penny Popular 109	Turning the Tables	Anon. (A. S. Hardy)		
The Penny Popular 110	No Proof	Anon. (E. Sempill aka M. Storm)		
The Penny Popular 111	Caught Redhanded	Anon. (E. Sempill aka M. Storm)		
The Penny Popular 112	The Confession	Anon. (L. J. Beeston)		
The Penny Popular 113	A False Friend	Anon. (L. J. Beeston)		
The Penny Popular 114	The Gypsy Detective	Anon. (Edgar Pickering)		
The Penny Popular 115	Sexton Blake's Masquerade	Anon. (Edgar Pickering)		
The Penny Popular 116	The Three Avengers	Anon. (William Murray Graydon)		
The Union Jack (2nd Series) 534	The Golden Calf	Anon. (John William Staniforth)		
The Union Jack (2nd Series) 535	The Mystery of the Monastery	Anon. (Andrew Murray)		
The Union Jack (2nd Series) 536	The Workings of Chance	Anon. (John W. Bobin)		
The Union Jack (2nd Series) 537	Plummer's Prisoner	Anon. (Lewis Carlton)		
The Union Jack (2nd Series) 538	The Secret of the Well	Anon. (John William Staniforth)		
The Union Jack (2nd Series) 539	The Snake's Fang	Anon. (H. E. Inman)		
The Union Jack (2nd Series) 540	The Garden City Swindle	Anon. (E. W. Alais)		
The Union Jack (2nd Series) 541	Plummer's White Hope	Anon. (Lewis Carlton)		
The Union Jack (2nd Series) 542	The Case of the Pewter Candlesticks	Anon. (H. E. Inman)		
The Union Jack (2nd Series) 543	The Grey Domino	Anon. (George Hamilton Teed)		
The Union Jack (2nd Series) 544	The Death Cylinder	Anon. (Andrew Murray)		
The Union Jack (2nd Series) 545	The Case From the Clouds	Anon. (John William Staniforth)		
The Union Jack (2nd Series) 546	The Man Who Sold His Estates	Anon. (Lewis Carlton)		
The Union Jack (2nd Series) 547	The Pursuit of Plummer	Anon. (Lewis Carlton)		
The Union Jack (2nd Series) 548	The Case of the Radium Patient	Anon. (George Hamilton Teed)		
The Union Jack (2nd Series) 549	The Gentleman Crook	Anon. (John W. Bobin)		
The Union Jack (2nd Series) 550	A Bid for a Battleship	Anon. (Andrew Murray)		
The Union Jack (2nd Series) 551	The Case of the Missing Britisher	Anon. (John W. Bobin)		
The Union Jack (2nd Series) 552	The Pirated Cargo	Anon. (George Hamilton Teed)		
The Union Jack (2nd Series) 553	The Madman's Fortune	Anon. (John William Staniforth)		
The Union Jack (2nd Series) 554	The Boundary Raiders	Anon. (Andrew Murray)		
The Union Jack (2nd Series) 555	The Council of Eleven	Anon. (George Hamilton Teed)	Notable character debut: The Council of Eleven	
The Union Jack (2nd Series) 556	The Sixpenny Doctor	Anon. (John William Staniforth)		
The Union Jack (2nd Series) 557	The Great Train Mystery	Anon. (John W. Bobin)		
The Union Jack (2nd Series) 558	The Death Club	Anon. (George Hamilton Teed)		
The Union Jack (2nd Series) 559	The Lost King	Anon. (George Hamilton Teed)	The Council of Eleven	
The Union Jack (2nd Series) 560	The Mountaineer's Secret	Anon. (George Hamilton Teed)	The Council of Eleven	
The Union Jack (2nd Series) 561	Arms for Ulster	Anon. (Andrew Murray)		
The Union Jack (2nd Series) 562	The Sheep Stealers	Anon. (John W. Bobin)		
The Union Jack (2nd Series) 563	The Bogus Prince	Anon. (Andrew Murray)		
Plus:				
The Case of the Strange Advertisement	Anon. (Lewis Carlton)			
The Union Jack (2nd Series) 564	The Crimson Pearl	Anon. (George Hamilton Teed)		
The Union Jack (2nd Series) 565	The Land of the Golden Beetle	Anon. (Cecil Hayter)	Lobangu	
Plus:				
The Colonel's Luck	Anon. (Unknown)			
The Union Jack (2nd Series) 566	Plummer at Sea	Anon. (Lewis Carlton)		
The Union Jack (2nd Series) 567	The Mystery Millionaire	Anon. (John W. Bobin)		
The Union Jack (2nd Series) 568	The Case of the Blind Baronet	Anon. (John W. Bobin)		
The Union Jack (2nd Series) 569	The Mystery of Shamrock IV	Anon. (Andrew Murray)		
The Union Jack (2nd Series) 570	The Case of the German Admiral	Anon. (Andrew Murray)		
The Union Jack (2nd Series) 571	A Fight for an Earldom	Anon. (George Hamilton Teed)	The Council of Eleven	
The Union Jack (2nd Series) 572	The Commerce Destroyer	Anon. (John W. Bobin)		
The Union Jack (2nd Series) 573	The Sweater's Punishment	Anon. (George Hamilton Teed)	Yvonne Cartier	
The Union Jack (2nd Series) 574	The Case of the German Trader	Anon. (Lewis Carlton)		
The Union Jack (2nd Series) 575	Made in Germany	Anon. (Andrew Murray)		
The Union Jack (2nd Series) 576	The Refugee	Anon. (George Hamilton Teed)	The Council of Eleven	
The Union Jack (2nd Series) 577	Sexton Blake in Togoland	Anon. (John W. Bobin)		
The Union Jack (2nd Series) 578	Business as Usual	Anon. (Andrew Murray)		
The Union Jack (2nd Series) 579	A Voice From the Dead	Anon. (George Hamilton Teed)		
The Union Jack (2nd Series) 580	The Case of the Secret Explosive	Anon. (John W. Bobin)		
The Union Jack (2nd Series) 581	The Blood Brothers	Anon. (Andrew Murray)		
The Union Jack (2nd Series) 582	The Great Cigarette Mystery	Anon. (George Hamilton Teed)	Yvonne Cartier	
The Union Jack (2nd Series) 583	The Case of the Belgian Relief Fund	Anon. (John W. Bobin)		
The Union Jack (2nd Series) 584	A Soldier — and a Man	Anon. (George Hamilton Teed)	Yvonne Cartier	
The Union Jack (2nd Series) 585	The White Feather	Anon. (Andrew Murray)		

== 1915 ==
Publication	Title	Author	Key Characters	Notes
The Boys' Friend Library 302	The Mystery of the Diamond Belt	Anon. (Lewis Carlton)		
The Boys' Journal 68	The Mystery of the Diamond Belt (part 12)	Lewis Carlton		
The Boys' Journal 69	The Mystery of the Diamond Belt (part 13)	Anon. (Lewis Carlton)		
The Boys' Journal 70	The Mystery of the Diamond Belt (part 14)	Anon. (Lewis Carlton)		
The Boys' Journal 71	The Mystery of the Diamond Belt (part 15)	Anon. (Lewis Carlton)		
The Boys' Journal 72	The Merchant's Secret (part 1)	Anon. (John W. Bobin)		
The Dreadnought 136	The Secret Plotter (part 3)	Anon. (W. J. Lomax)		
The Dreadnought 137	The Secret Plotter (part 4)	Anon. (W. J. Lomax)		
The Dreadnought 138	The Secret Plotter (part 5)	Anon. (W. J. Lomax)		
The Dreadnought 139	The Secret Plotter (part 6)	Anon. (W. J. Lomax)		
The Dreadnought 140	The Secret Plotter (part 7)	Anon. (W. J. Lomax)		
The Dreadnought 141	The Merchant's Secret (part 1)	Anon. (John W. Bobin)		
Plus:				
The Secret Plotter (part 8)	Anon. (W. J. Lomax)			
The Dreadnought 142	The Merchant's Secret (part 2)	Anon. (W. J. Lomax)		
The Dreadnought 143	The Merchant's Secret (part 3)	Anon. (W. J. Lomax)		
The Dreadnought 144	The Merchant's Secret (part 4)	Anon. (W. J. Lomax)		
The Dreadnought 145	The Merchant's Secret (part 5)	Anon. (W. J. Lomax)		
The Dreadnought 146	The Merchant's Secret (part 6)	Anon. (W. J. Lomax)		
The Dreadnought 147	The Merchant's Secret (part 7)	Anon. (W. J. Lomax)		
The Dreadnought 148	The Merchant's Secret (part 8)	Anon. (W. J. Lomax)		
The Dreadnought 149	The Merchant's Secret (part 9)	Anon. (W. J. Lomax)		
The Dreadnought 150	The Merchant's Secret (part 10)	Anon. (W. J. Lomax)		
The Dreadnought 151	The Merchant's Secret (part 11)	Anon. (W. J. Lomax)		
The Dreadnought 152	The Merchant's Secret (part 12)	Anon. (W. J. Lomax)		
The Dreadnought 153	The Merchant's Secret (part 13)	Anon. (W. J. Lomax)		
The Dreadnought 154	The Merchant's Secret (part 14)	Anon. (W. J. Lomax)		
The Dreadnought 155	The Merchant's Secret (part 15)	Anon. (W. J. Lomax)		
The Dreadnought 156	The Merchant's Secret (part 16)	Anon. (W. J. Lomax)		
The Dreadnought 157	The Merchant's Secret (part 17)	Anon. (W. J. Lomax)		
The Dreadnought 158	The Merchant's Secret (part 18)	Anon. (W. J. Lomax)		
The Dreadnought 159	The Merchant's Secret (part 19)	Anon. (W. J. Lomax)		
The Penny Popular 117	Rough Justice	Anon. (William Murray Graydon)		
The Penny Popular 118	Thwarting the Hypnotist	Anon. (D. H. Parry)		
The Penny Popular 119	The Last Stand	Anon. (D. H. Parry)		
The Penny Popular 120	A Nation's Fate	Anon. (D. H. Parry)		
The Penny Popular 121	An Imperial Blunder	Anon. (D. H. Parry)		
The Penny Popular 122	The Gambler's Ruse	Anon. (L. J. Beeston)		
The Penny Popular 123	Foul Play	Anon. (L. J. Beeston)		
The Penny Popular 124	Restoring a Kingdom	Anon. (E. W. Alais)		
The Penny Popular 125	The Man From Winnipeg	Anon. (William J. Bayfield)		
The Penny Popular 126	Foiled at the Finish	Anon. (G. Carr)		
The Penny Popular 127	Clearing His Name	Anon. (Norman Goddard)		
The Penny Popular 128	A Fresh Start	Anon. (William Murray Graydon)		
The Penny Popular 129	The Signal of Distress	Anon. (Edgar Pickering)		
The Penny Popular 130	Run to Earth	Anon. (William Murray Graydon)		
The Penny Popular 131	The Wrong Man	Anon. (William J. Bayfield)		
The Penny Popular 132	Colonel Tanford's Valour	Anon. (E. J. Gannon)		
The Penny Popular 133	The Wonder Gun	Anon. (William Murray Graydon)		
The Penny Popular 134	The Isle of Mystery	Anon. (G. Carr)		
The Penny Popular 135	Rivals for Fortune	Anon. (William Murray Graydon)		
The Penny Popular 136	Simon Leach – Swindler	Anon. (Norman Goddard)		
The Penny Popular 137	The Hidden Heiress	Anon. (Unknown)		
The Penny Popular 138	An Errand of Justice	Anon. (A. S. Hardy)		
The Penny Popular 139	His Own Betrayer	Anon. (A. S. Hardy)		
The Penny Popular 140	Reaping the Whirlwind	Anon. (E. Sempill aka M. Storm)		
The Penny Popular 141	Unveiling the Past	Anon. (E. Sempill aka M. Storm)		
The Penny Popular 142	The Fatal Verdict	Anon. (William Murray Graydon)		
The Penny Popular 143	Restored to His Own	Anon. (William Murray Graydon)		
The Penny Popular 144	The Penniless Playwright	Anon. (William Murray Graydon)		
The Penny Popular 145	The Unfinished Drama	Anon. (William Murray Graydon)		
The Penny Popular 146	The River-House Mystery	Anon. (E. W. Alais)		
The Penny Popular 147	Police-Constable Tinker	Anon. (E. W. Alais)		
The Penny Popular 148	Through Prison Bars	Anon. (E. Sempill aka M. Storm)		
The Penny Popular 149	A Fugitive From Justice	Anon. (E. Sempill aka M. Storm)		
The Penny Popular 150	The Missing Scoutmaster	Anon. (Edgar Pickering)		
The Penny Popular 151	The Mystery of Highdown Heath	Anon. (Edgar Pickering)		
The Penny Popular 152	Partners in Peril	Anon. (E. Sempill aka M. Storm)		
The Penny Popular 153	The Doors of Dartmoor	Anon. (E. Sempill aka M. Storm)		
The Penny Popular 154	At Crossed Swords	Anon. (L. J. Beeston)		
The Penny Popular 155	The Night Riders	Anon. (L. J. Beeston)		
The Penny Popular 156	The Secretary's Ruse	Anon. (E. Sempill aka M. Storm)		
The Penny Popular 157	Tinker's Daring	Anon. (E. Sempill aka M. Storm)		
The Penny Popular 158	The Rescuer's Reward	Anon. (William Murray Graydon)		
The Penny Popular 159	Exiled From England	Anon. (William Murray Graydon)		
The Penny Popular 160	Fooling With Fate	Anon. (William J. Bayfield)		
The Penny Popular 161	The Road to Ruin	Anon. (William J. Bayfield)		
The Penny Popular 162	Rivals for the Right	Anon. (William Murray Graydon)		
The Penny Popular 163	An Amazing Masquerade	Anon. (William Murray Graydon)		
The Penny Popular 164	Birds of a Feather	Anon. (Unknown)		
The Penny Popular 165	In Convict's Guise	Anon. (Unknown)		
The Penny Popular 166	The Chinese Rivals	Anon. (William Murray Graydon)		
The Penny Popular 167	The Sacred Pardon	Anon. (William Murray Graydon)		
The Penny Popular 168	The Fate of the 'Mermaid'	Anon. (E. W. Alais)		
Pluck 555	The Prize Ship (part 1)	Anon. (George Hamilton Teed)		
Pluck 556	The Prize Ship (part 2)	Anon. (George Hamilton Teed)		
Pluck 567	The Great Cheque Fraud (part 1)	Anon. (Unknown)		
Pluck 568	The Great Cheque Fraud (part 2)	Anon. (Unknown)		
Pluck 569	The Great Cheque Fraud (part 3)	Anon. (Unknown)		
Pluck 570	The Great Cheque Fraud (part 4)	Anon. (Unknown)		
Pluck 571	The Great Cheque Fraud (part 5)	Anon. (Unknown)		
Pluck 572	The Great Cheque Fraud (part 6)	Anon. (Unknown)		
Pluck 573	The Great Cheque Fraud (part 7)	Anon. (Unknown)		
Pluck 574	The Great Cheque Fraud (part 8)	Anon. (Unknown)		
Pluck 575	The Great Cheque Fraud (part 9)	Anon. (Unknown)		
Pluck 576	The Great Cheque Fraud (part 10)	Anon. (Unknown)		
Pluck 577	The Make-Shift	Anon. (Unknown)		
Plus:				
The Great Cheque Fraud (part 11)	Anon. (Unknown)			
Pluck 578	The Great Cheque Fraud (part 12)	Anon. (Unknown)		
Pluck 579	The Great Cheque Fraud (part 13)	Anon. (Unknown)		
Pluck 580	The Great Cheque Fraud (part 14)	Anon. (Unknown)		
Pluck 581	The Great Cheque Fraud (part 15)	Anon. (Unknown)		
Pluck 582	The Great Cheque Fraud (part 16)	Anon. (Unknown)		
The Sexton Blake Library 1	The Yellow Tiger	Anon. (George Hamilton Teed)	Prince Wu Ling, Yvonne Cartier, The Council of Eleven	
The Sexton Blake Library 2	Ill-gotten Gains	Anon. (Andrew Murray)	Professor Kew and Count Ivor Carlac	
The Sexton Blake Library 3	The Shadow of His Crime	Anon. (John W. Bobin)	Ezra Q. Maitland and Broadway Kate	
The Sexton Blake Library 4	The Rajah's Revenge	Anon. (Andrew Murray)	Professor Kew and Count Ivor Carlac	
The Sexton Blake Library 5	'Midst Balkan Perils	Anon. (William Murray Graydon)	Laban Creed	The issue also includes The Case of the Shrivelled Fingers, a short story featuring detective Nelson Lee.
The Union Jack (2nd Series) 586	The Case of the Missing Reservist	Anon. (Lewis Carlton)		
The Union Jack (2nd Series) 587	The Millionaire Traitor	Anon. (Lewis Carlton)		
The Union Jack (2nd Series) 588	The Case of the German Colony	Anon. (George Hamilton Teed)		
The Union Jack (2nd Series) 599	Private Tinker – A.S.C.	Anon. (William Murray Graydon)		
The Union Jack (2nd Series) 590	The Case of the Concentration Camp	Anon. (Lewis Carlton)		
The Union Jack (2nd Series) 591	The Mystery of the Banana Plantation	Anon. (George Hamilton Teed)	Dr. Huxton Rymer	
The Union Jack (2nd Series) 592	The Holding of the Kana Pass	Anon. (Cecil Hayter)		
The Union Jack (2nd Series) 593	Plummer's Dilemma	Anon. (John W. Bobin)		
The Union Jack (2nd Series) 594	The Conniston Diamonds	Anon. (George Hamilton Teed)		
The Union Jack (2nd Series) 595	Abdulla the Horse Dealer	Anon. (Andrew Murray)		
The Union Jack (2nd Series) 596	The Case Of the Poisoned Telephones	Anon. (George Hamilton Teed)	Prince Wu Ling	
The Union Jack (2nd Series) 597	The Army Contract Scandal	Anon. (George Hamilton Teed)	Yvonne Cartier	
The Union Jack (2nd Series) 598	The Great Remount Swindle	Anon. (Andrew Murray)		
The Union Jack (2nd Series) 599	The Vengeance of the Eleven	Anon. (George Hamilton Teed)	The Council of Eleven	
The Union Jack (2nd Series) 600	The Case of the Agent From Austria	Anon. (John W. Bobin)		
The Union Jack (2nd Series) 601	An Officer and a Gentleman	Anon. (William Murray Graydon)		
The Union Jack (2nd Series) 602	The Case of the Canadian Brothers	Anon. (E. W. Alais)		
The Union Jack (2nd Series) 603	The 10,000 Insurance Case	Anon. (Andrew Murray)		
The Union Jack (2nd Series) 604	The Case of the Turkish Bonds	Anon. (William J. Bayfield)		
The Union Jack (2nd Series) 605	The Abbey Mystery	Anon. (Cecil Hayter)		
The Union Jack (2nd Series) 606	The Case of the Nihilist's Daughter	Anon. (Norman Goddard)		
The Union Jack (2nd Series) 607	The Quest of the Grey Panther	Anon. (George Hamilton Teed)	Prince Wu Ling	
The Union Jack (2nd Series) 608	The Mob Leader	Anon. (Andrew Murray)		
The Union Jack (2nd Series) 619	The Mystery of the Mosque	Anon. (J. W. Bobin)		
The Union Jack (2nd Series) 610	The Clue of the Khaki Cloth	Anon. (Andrew Murray)		
The Union Jack (2nd Series) 611	His German Brother	Anon. (William Murray Graydon)		
The Union Jack (2nd Series) 612	The Spectre of the Normanvilles	Anon. (John W. Bobin)		
The Union Jack (2nd Series) 613	Scoundrels All	Anon. (George Hamilton Teed)	Dr. Huxton Rymer	
The Union Jack (2nd Series) 614	The Secret of Kilchester Towers	Anon. (George Hamilton Teed)	Yvonne Cartier	
The Union Jack (2nd Series) 615	In London's Labyrinth	Anon. (E. W. Alais)		
The Union Jack (2nd Series) 616	Bribery and Corruption	Anon. (George Hamilton Teed)	Hammerton Palmer	
The Union Jack (2nd Series) 617	The Prisoner of the Dardanelles	Anon. (William Murray Graydon)		
The Union Jack (2nd Series) 618	Sexton Blake – Pirate	Anon. (George Hamilton Teed)	Dr. Huxton Rymer	
The Union Jack (2nd Series) 619	The Mark of the Maimed Hand	Anon. (John W. Bobin)		
The Union Jack (2nd Series) 620	The Case of the Cataleptic	Anon. (Jack Lewis)		
The Union Jack (2nd Series) 621	The Vengeance of the Black Hand	Anon. (William Murray Graydon)		
The Union Jack (2nd Series) 622	The Case of the Cabinet Minister	Anon. (George Hamilton Teed)		
The Union Jack (2nd Series) 623	The Case of the 'Frisco Leper	Anon. (George Hamilton Teed)	Dr. Huxton Rymer	
The Union Jack (2nd Series) 624	At 4 O'Clock	Anon. (Andrew Murray)		
The Union Jack (2nd Series) 625	In Time of War	Anon. (William Murray Graydon)		
The Union Jack (2nd Series) 626	The Death Sleep	Anon. (Andrew Murray)		
The Union Jack (2nd Series) 627	The Case of the Junior Cashier	Anon. (William J. Bayfield)		
The Union Jack (2nd Series) 628	The Man Who Made Good	Anon. (William Murray Graydon)		
The Union Jack (2nd Series) 629	Self Accused	Anon. (Andrew Murray)		
The Union Jack (2nd Series) 630	The Case of the Audley Tiara	Anon. (John W. Bobin)		
The Union Jack (2nd Series) 631	The Man With the Scarred Neck	Anon. (George Hamilton Teed)	Yvonne Cartier	Part 1 of Yvonne's Island Colony Saga
The Union Jack (2nd Series) 632	The Counterfeiters	Anon. (John W. Bobin)		
The Union Jack (2nd Series) 633	Fugitives From Justice	Anon. (George Hamilton Teed)	Yvonne Cartier	Part 2 of Yvonne's Island Colony Saga
The Union Jack (2nd Series) 634	In the Heart of London	Anon. (E. W. Alais)		
The Union Jack (2nd Series) 635	The Case of the Engleby Earrings	Anon. (John W. Bobin)		
The Union Jack (2nd Series) 636	The Case of the African Missionary	Anon. (Andrew Murray)		
The Union Jack (2nd Series) 637	Tried in Camera	Anon. (William Murray Graydon)		

== 1916 ==
Publication	Title	Author	Key Characters	Notes
The Penny Popular 169	The House of Intrigue	Anon. (E. W. Alais)		
The Penny Popular 170	Rogues of the Turf	Anon. (William J. Bayfield)		
The Penny Popular 171	Called to Account	Anon. (William J. Bayfield)		
The Penny Popular 172	A Fight for Justice	Anon. (E. W. Alais)		
The Penny Popular 173	The Tyrant of the Poor	Anon. (E. W. Alais)		
The Penny Popular 174	The Man of the 4–15	Anon. (E. Sempill aka M. Storm)		
The Penny Popular 175	The Squire's Secret	Anon. (E. Sempill aka M. Storm)		
The Penny Popular 176	The Cards of Fate	Anon. (William Murray Graydon)		
The Penny Popular 177	Hunted and Harried	Anon. (William Murray Graydon)		
The Penny Popular 178	A Web of Intrigue	Anon. (E. J. Gannon)		
The Penny Popular 179	The Coils of Evidence	Anon. (E. J. Gannon)		
The Penny Popular 180	The Missing Manager	Anon. (William Murray Graydon)		
The Penny Popular 181	Thwarting the Taskmaster	Anon. (William Murray Graydon)		
The Penny Popular 182	The Dancer's Secret	Anon. (W. J. Lomax)		
The Penny Popular 183	A Vow Fulfilled	Anon. (W. J. Lomax)		
The Penny Popular 184	A Desperate Resolve	Anon. (William Murray Graydon)		
The Penny Popular 185	The River Mystery	Anon. (William Murray Graydon)		
The Penny Popular 186	After Three Years	Anon. (William Murray Graydon)		
The Penny Popular 187	A Sailor's Ordeal	Anon. (William Murray Graydon)		
The Penny Popular 188	The Village Tyrant	Anon. (E. J. Gannon)		
The Penny Popular 189	Foiled at the Finish	Anon. (E. J. Gannon)		
The Penny Popular 190	The Silent Avenger	Anon. (W. J. Lomax)		
The Penny Popular 191	The Wrath of Kama	Anon. (W. J. Lomax)		
The Penny Popular 192	Birds of Prey	Anon. (E. Sempill aka M. Storm)		
The Penny Popular 193	The City Conspiracy	Anon. (E. Sempill aka M. Storm)		
The Penny Popular 194	To Redeem the Past	Anon. (J. G. Jones)		
The Penny Popular 195	The Swindler's Downfall	Anon. (J. G. Jones)		
The Penny Popular 196	The Great Society Scandal	Anon. (William Murray Graydon)		
The Penny Popular 197	An Affair of Court	Anon. (William Murray Graydon)		
The Penny Popular 198	For His Dad's Sake	Anon. (William Murray Graydon)		
The Penny Popular 199	The Traitor's Fate	Anon. (William Murray Graydon)		
The Penny Popular 200	The Seaside Mystery	Anon. (William Murray Graydon)		
The Penny Popular 201	The Silent Accuser	Anon. (William Murray Graydon)		
The Penny Popular 202	A Fortune at Stake	Anon. (William Murray Graydon)		
The Penny Popular 203	The Redskin's Loyalty	Anon. (William Murray Graydon)		
The Penny Popular 204	The Duped Detective	Anon. (Norman Goddard)		
The Penny Popular 205	The Unwritten Law	Anon. (Norman Goddard)		
The Penny Popular 206	The Mystery of the Masterpiece	Anon. (William J. Bayfield)		
The Penny Popular 207	The Scheming Secretary	Anon. (William J. Bayfield)		
The Penny Popular 208	Wanted for Wealth	Anon. (W. J. Lomax)		
The Penny Popular 209	The Avaricious Aristocrat	Anon. (W. J. Lomax)		
The Penny Popular 210	The Poacher's Plight	Anon. (William Murray Graydon)		
The Penny Popular 211	His Cousin's Crime	Anon. (William Murray Graydon)		
The Penny Popular 212	Traced by Treachery	Anon. (J. G. Jones)		
The Penny Popular 213	Fleeced of a Fortune	Anon. (J. G. Jones)		
The Penny Popular 214	Shielded from Shame	Anon. (W. J. Lomax)		
The Penny Popular 215	The Detective's Deceit	Anon. (W. J. Lomax)		
The Penny Popular 216	The Financier's Failure	Anon. (William Murray Graydon)		
The Penny Popular 217	Rescued from Ruin	Anon. (William Murray Graydon)		
The Penny Popular 218	Sexton Blake, Editor	Anon. (Norman Goddard)		
The Penny Popular 219	Convicted for Conspiracy	Anon. (Norman Goddard)		
The Penny Popular 220	The Partner's Plot	Anon. (William J. Bayfield)		
The Penny Popular 221	Sexton Blake, Cashier	Anon. (William J. Bayfield)		
Pluck 583	The Great Cheque Fraud (part 17)	Anon. (Unknown)		
Pluck 584	The Great Cheque Fraud (part 18)	Anon. (Unknown)		
Pluck 585	The Great Cheque Fraud (part 19)	Anon. (Unknown)		
Pluck 586	The Great Cheque Fraud (part 20)	Anon. (Unknown)		
Pluck 587	The Great Cheque Fraud (part 21)	Anon. (Unknown)		
Pluck 588	The Great Cheque Fraud (part 22)	Anon. (Unknown)		
Pluck 589	The Great Cheque Fraud (part 23)	Anon. (Unknown)		
Pluck 590	The Great Cheque Fraud (part 24)	Anon. (Unknown)		
Pluck 591	The Great Cheque Fraud (part 25)	Anon. (Unknown)		
The Sexton Blake Library 6	The Red Spider	Anon. (Edwy Searles Brooks)		
The Sexton Blake Library 7	The Case of Convict 308	Anon. (E. W. Alais)	Features Captain Horatio Peak	
The Sexton Blake Library 8	Victims of Villainy	Anon. (Andrew Murray)	Features Count Ivor Carlac and Professor Kew	
The Sexton Blake Library 9	The Merchant's Secret	Anon. (John W. Bobin)	Features Ezra Q. Maitland and Broadway Kate	
The Sexton Blake Library 10	The Grip of the Law	Anon. (John W. Bobin)		
The Sexton Blake Library 11	The Two Mysteries	Anon. (George Hamilton Teed)	Features Dr. Huxton Rymer and Baron de Beauremon	This marks the last appearance of Baron de Beauremon
The Sexton Blake Library 12	The Peril of the Prince	Anon. (Edwy Searles Brooks)		
The Sexton Blake Library 13	The Case of the Twin Detectives	Anon. (Edwy Searles Brooks)	Vincent Crane	
The Sexton Blake Library 14	The Case of the Suppressed Will	Anon. (William Murray Graydon)	Inspector Widgeon	Set against the events of the Easter Rising in Dublin, April 1916.
The Sexton Blake Library 15	The Black Chrysanthemum	Anon. (Andrew Murray)		
The Sexton Blake Library 16	Payment in Full	Anon. (John W. Bobin)		
The Sexton Blake Library 17	Their Great Adventure	Anon. (William Murray Graydon)	Notable character debut: Basil Wicketshaw	
The Sexton Blake Library 18	The Banker's Trust	Anon. (John W. Bobin)		
The Sexton Blake Library 19	His Excellency's Secret	Anon. (Andrew Murray)	Features Count Ivor Carlac and Professor Kew	
The Sexton Blake Library 20	In Triple Disguise	Anon. (William Murray Graydon)		
The Sexton Blake Library 21	The Golden Belts	Anon. (Andrew Murray)		
The Sexton Blake Library 22	The Case of the Cashiered Officer	Anon. (William Murray Graydon)		
The Union Jack (2nd Series) 638	The Case of the Prisoner of War	Anon. (William J. Bayfield)		
The Union Jack (2nd Series) 639	At the Turn of the Hour	Anon. (George Hamilton Teed)	Features Baron de Beauremon; Yvonne Cartier	Part 3 of Yvonne's Island Colony Saga
The Union Jack (2nd Series) 640	A Marked Man	Anon. (Andrew Murray)		
The Union Jack (2nd Series) 641	The Case of the Chinese Mascot	Anon. (Jack Lewis)		
The Union Jack (2nd Series) 642	The Case of the Morphia Patient	Anon. (John W. Bobin)		
The Union Jack (2nd Series) 643	In Darkest London	Anon. (William Murray Graydon)		
The Union Jack (2nd Series) 644	The Circle of Steel	Anon. (John W. Bobin)		
The Union Jack (2nd Series) 645	On War Service	Anon. (Cecil Hayter)		
The Union Jack (2nd Series) 646	The Case of the Missing Airman	Anon. (Jack Lewis)		
The Union Jack (2nd Series) 647	The Affair of the Ulledon Plate	Anon. (Andrew Murray)		
The Union Jack (2nd Series) 648	The Case of the Forged Passports	Anon. (William J. Bayfield)		
The Union Jack (2nd Series) 649	The Great Sapphire Mystery	Anon. (John W. Bobin)		
The Union Jack (2nd Series) 650	The Clue of the Khaki Armlet	Anon. (John W. Bobin)		
The Union Jack (2nd Series) 651	913 or The Case of the Aniline Formula	Anon. (Jack Lewis)		
The Union Jack (2nd Series) 652	The Place of Fire	Anon. (Cecil Hayter)		
The Union Jack (2nd Series) 653	The Martel Square Affair	Anon. (Andrew Murray)		
The Union Jack (2nd Series) 654	The Strange Case of Mr. Justice Jannifer	Anon. (William J. Bayfield)		
The Union Jack (2nd Series) 655	The Affair of the Dutch Merchant	Anon. (Jack Lewis)		
The Union Jack (2nd Series) 656	The Island of Fear	Anon. (George Hamilton Teed)	Features Yvonne Cartier	Part 4 of Yvonne's Island Colony Saga
The Union Jack (2nd Series) 657	The House in the Willows	Anon. (Andrew Murray)		
The Union Jack (2nd Series) 658	The Prisoner of Portillo	Anon. (John W. Bobin)		
The Union Jack (2nd Series) 659	The Curious Case of the Missing Boy	Anon. (E. W. Alais)		
The Union Jack (2nd Series) 660	The Parrowby Will Mystery	Anon. (William J. Bayfield)		
The Union Jack (2nd Series) 661	Besieged in Kut	Anon. (Andrew Murray)		
The Union Jack (2nd Series) 662	The Mystery of Martin Esher	Anon. (Jack Lewis)		
The Union Jack (2nd Series) 663	The Case of the Missing Princess	Anon. (George Hamilton Teed)		
The Union Jack (2nd Series) 664	The House of Secrets	Anon. (Cecil Hayter)		
The Union Jack (2nd Series) 665	Seaplane X.4.	Anon. (Andrew Murray)		
The Union Jack (2nd Series) 666	Who Killed Simon Phaley?	Anon. (William J. Bayfield)		
The Union Jack (2nd Series) 667	The Case of the Cinema Star	Anon. (John W. Bobin)		
The Union Jack (2nd Series) 668	The Amazing Case of the Blind Fiddler	Anon. (Jack Lewis)		
The Union Jack (2nd Series) 669	A 'Corner' in Vanilla	Anon. (George Hamilton Teed)		
The Union Jack (2nd Series) 670	The Mystery of Rookwood Towers	Anon. (William Murray Graydon)		
The Union Jack (2nd Series) 671	The Bogus Confession	Anon. (John W. Bobin)		
The Union Jack (2nd Series) 672	The Mystery of the Inari Treasure	Anon. (Cecil Hayter)		
The Union Jack (2nd Series) 673	The Case of the White Fugitive	Anon. (Jack Lewis)		
The Union Jack (2nd Series) 674	Who Was Jasper Drew?	Anon. (William Murray Graydon)		
The Union Jack (2nd Series) 675	The Detective's Ordeal	Anon. (Robert Murray Graydon)		
The Union Jack (2nd Series) 676	The Food Profiteer	Anon. (Andrew Murray)		
The Union Jack (2nd Series) 677	The Fool's Highway	Anon. (Jack Lewis)		
The Union Jack (2nd Series) 678	Who Was the Thief?	Anon. (Andrew Murray)		
The Union Jack (2nd Series) 679	The Case of the Third Partner	Anon. (William J. Bayfield)		
The Union Jack (2nd Series) 680	The Hidden Hand	Anon. (Robert Murray Graydon)	Notable character debut: Dirk Dolland aka The Bat	The Bat began his career as a criminal but eventually allied with Blake to fight the Criminals' Confederation
The Union Jack (2nd Series) 681	The Moor House Mystery	Anon. (Cecil Hayter)		
The Union Jack (2nd Series) 682	A Case of Salvage	Anon. (William Murray Graydon)		
The Union Jack (2nd Series) 683	The Wheat Ring	Anon. (Andrew Murray)		
The Union Jack (2nd Series) 684	The Poison Fumes	Anon. (Jack Lewis)		
The Union Jack (2nd Series) 685	The Blue God	Anon. (George Hamilton Teed)	Features Dr Huxton Rymer, Hamilton Palmer and Yvonne Cartier	
The Union Jack (2nd Series) 686	The Case of the Bogus Detective	Anon. (Robert Murray Graydon)	Features The Bat	
The Union Jack (2nd Series) 687	The Curious Case of the Crown Prince	Anon. (William J. Bayfield)		
The Union Jack (2nd Series) 688	In Double Harness	Anon. (Robert Murray Graydon)	Also includes detective Nelson lee	
The Union Jack (2nd Series) 689	The Great Hoax	Anon. (Jack Lewis)		
The Union Jack (2nd Series) 690	Held in Trust	Anon. (William Murray Graydon)		

== 1917 ==
Publication	Title	Author	Key Characters	Notes
The Sexton Blake Library 23	Traitor and Spy	Anon. (A. S. Hardy)		
The Sexton Blake Library 24	The Man With the Green Eyes	Anon. (Norman Goddard)	George Marsden Plummer	
The Sexton Blake Library 25	The Secret of the Draker's Folly	Anon. (Andrew Murray)	Features Count Ivor Carlac and Professor Kew	
The Sexton Blake Library 26	The Embassy Detective	Anon. (William Murray Graydon)	Basil Wicketshaw	
The Sexton Blake Library 27	A Case of Blackmail	Anon. (Ernest W. Alais)	Captain Horatio Peak	
The Sexton Blake Library 28	Sexton Blake, Special Constable	Anon. (John W. Bobin)	Aubrey Dexter	
The Sexton Blake Library 29	The Catspaw, or Hounded Down	Anon. (Andrew Murray)	Features Count Ivor Carlac, Professor Kew and John Lawless	
The Sexton Blake Library 30	The Three Trails	Anon. (William Murray Graydon)		
The Sexton Blake Library 31	Craft and Cunning	Anon. (William Murray Graydon)		
The Sexton Blake Library 32	Ten Years After	Anon. (John W. Bobin)		
The Sexton Blake Library 33	The House With the Double Moat	Anon. (Edwy Searles Brooks)		
The Sexton Blake Library 34	The Blockade Runners	Anon. (William Murray Graydon)		
The Sexton Blake Library 35	The Half-Caste	Anon. (Andrew Murray)	John Lawless	
The Sexton Blake Library 36	The Perils of Petrograd	Anon. (William Murray Graydon)		
The Sexton Blake Library 37	The Diamond Sunburst	Anon. (George Hamilton Teed)	Features Yvonne Cartier and Jim Potter	
The Sexton Blake Library 38	Vengeance	Anon. (Andrew Murray)	Features Count Ivor Carlac and Professor Kew	
The Sexton Blake Library 39	A Legacy of Shame	Anon. (John W. Bobin)	Broadway Kate	
The Sexton Blake Library 40	The Secret of the Past	Anon. (William Murray Graydon)		
The Sexton Blake Library 41	The Mysterious Mr. Reece	Anon. (Robert Murray Graydon)	Notable character debut: Mr. Reece. Also features The Bat and The Butterfly	Mr. Reece went on to play a prominent role in the Criminals' Confederation saga
The Sexton Blake Library 42	The Black Bat	Anon. (Andrew Murray)		
The Sexton Blake Library 43	The Case of the International Adventurer	Anon. (John W. Bobin)	Broadway Kate, Glory Gale and Aubrey Dexter	
The Sexton Blake Library 44	Where the Trail Ended	Anon. (William Murray Graydon)		
The Sexton Blake Library 45	The Barrier Reef Mystery	Anon. (Andrew Murray)	John Lawless	
The Sexton Blake Library 46	When Conscience Sleeps	Anon. (William J. Bayfield)		
The Union Jack (2nd Series) 691	The Mark of the Thumb	Anon. (William J. Bayfield)		
The Union Jack (2nd Series) 692	The Sunken Schooner	Anon. (George Hamilton Teed)		
The Union Jack (2nd Series) 693	The Clue of the Bowler Hat	Anon. (John W. Bobin)		
The Union Jack (2nd Series) 694	The Lost Journalist	Anon. (William Murray Graydon)		
The Union Jack (2nd Series) 695	The Mystery of the Missing Manager	Anon. (Robert Murray Graydon)		
The Union Jack (2nd Series) 696	The Treasure of Sonora	Anon. (Cecil Hayter)		
The Union Jack (2nd Series) 697	The Broken Span	Anon. (George Hamilton Teed)		
The Union Jack (2nd Series) 698	A Case of Arson	Anon. (Robert Murray Graydon)		
The Union Jack (2nd Series) 699	The Stolen Factory	Anon. (Andrew Murray)		
The Union Jack (2nd Series) 700	Sexton Blake in Armenia	Anon. (William Murray Graydon)		
The Union Jack (2nd Series) 701	The Black Rat	Anon. (George Hamilton Teed)		
The Union Jack (2nd Series) 702	The Typewritten Clue	Anon. (William J. Bayfield)		
The Union Jack (2nd Series) 703	The Emerald Necklace	Anon. (George Hamilton Teed)		
The Union Jack (2nd Series) 704	The Mystery of Cell Six	Anon. (Robert Murray Graydon)		
The Union Jack (2nd Series) 705	The Mystery of Fallow Side Farm	Anon. (Andrew Murray)		
The Union Jack (2nd Series) 706	The Crest of the Flood	Anon. (George Hamilton Teed)		
The Union Jack (2nd Series) 707	The Opium Smugglers	Anon. (George Hamilton Teed)		
The Union Jack (2nd Series) 708	The Grimsdale Abbey Affair	Anon. (Andrew Murray)		
The Union Jack (2nd Series) 709	The Two Impersonators	Anon. (Robert Murray Graydon)		
The Union Jack (2nd Series) 710	At the Full of the Moon	Anon. (George Hamilton Teed)		
The Union Jack (2nd Series) 711	The Great Office Mystery	Anon. (Jack Lewis)		
The Union Jack (2nd Series) 712	A Case of Extradition	Anon. (George Hamilton Teed)		
The Union Jack (2nd Series) 713	The Mystery of Dead Tree Hill	Anon. (William J. Bayfield)		
The Union Jack (2nd Series) 714	The Three Millionaires	Anon. (George Hamilton Teed)		
The Union Jack (2nd Series) 715	Uncut Diamonds	Anon. (George Hamilton Teed)		
The Union Jack (2nd Series) 716	The Case of the 20,000 Witness	Anon. (John W. Bobin)		
The Union Jack (2nd Series) 717	Twice Charged	Anon. (Andrew Murray)		
The Union Jack (2nd Series) 718	The Case of the Lorimer Twins	Anon. (George Hamilton Teed)		
The Union Jack (2nd Series) 719	On the Night of the Storm	Anon. (E. J. Murray)		
The Union Jack (2nd Series) 720	'Twixt Sunset and Dawn	Anon. (Edwy Searles Brooks)		
The Union Jack (2nd Series) 721	The Thumbnail Clue	Anon. (E. W. Alais)		
The Union Jack (2nd Series) 722	The Case of Reincarnation	Anon. (George Hamilton Teed)		
The Union Jack (2nd Series) 723	The Secret Hand	Anon. (George Hamilton Teed)		
The Union Jack (2nd Series) 724	When Rogues Fall Out	Anon. (E. J. Murray)		
The Union Jack (2nd Series) 725	When Greek Meets Greek	Anon. (Andrew Murray)		
The Union Jack (2nd Series) 726	The Riddle of Yew Hollow	Anon. (Edwy Searles Brooks)		
The Union Jack (2nd Series) 727	The Pearls of Silence	Anon. (George Hamilton Teed)		
Plus:In the Hands of the Head Hunters (part 1)	Anon. (Cecil Hayter)			
The Union Jack (2nd Series) 728	The Case of the Crimson Terror	Anon. (George Hamilton Teed)		
Plus:In the Hands of the Head Hunters (part 2)	Anon. (Cecil Hayter)			
The Union Jack (2nd Series) 729	The Valley of Crags	Anon. (Edwy Searles Brooks)		
The Union Jack (2nd Series) 730	The Case of the Uncensored Letter	Anon. (William Murray Graydon)		
Plus:				
In the Hands of the Head Hunters (part 3)	Anon. (Cecil Hayter)			
The Union Jack (2nd Series) 731	The Invisible Ray	Anon. (George Hamilton Teed)		
Plus:In the Hands of the Head Hunters (part 4)	Anon. (Cecil Hayter)			
The Union Jack (2nd Series) 732	The Strange Case of the Red Pocket Book	Anon. (William J. Bayfield)		
The Union Jack (2nd Series) 733	The Secret of the Third Panel	Anon. (Edwy Searles Brooks)		
Plus:				
In the Hands of the Head Hunters (part 5)	Anon. (Cecil Hayter)			
The Union Jack (2nd Series) 734	The Broken Bail	Anon. (John W. Bobin)		
Plus:In the Hands of the Head Hunters (part 6)	Anon. (Cecil Hayter)			
The Union Jack (2nd Series) 735	The Heir of Quarterlands	Anon. (William J. Bayfield)		
Plus:				
In the Hands of the Head Hunters (part 7)	Anon. (Cecil Hayter)			
The Union Jack (2nd Series) 736	The Ordeal of Gordon Wood	Anon. (Robert Murray Graydon)		
Plus:				
In the Hands of the Head Hunters (part 8)	Anon. (Cecil Hayter)			
The Union Jack (2nd Series) 737	The Peril of the Trehernes	Anon. (Edwy Searles Brooks)		
The Union Jack (2nd Series) 738	Run to Earth	Anon. (Cecil Hayter)		
Plus:				
In the Hands of the Head Hunters (part 9)	Anon. (Cecil Hayter)			
The Union Jack (2nd Series) 739	The Case of the 10,000 Fee	Anon. (Andrew Murray)		
Plus:				
In the Hands of the Head Hunters (part 10)	Anon. (Cecil Hayter)			
The Union Jack (2nd Series) 740	The Amazing Affair of the Brixton Burglary	Anon. (John W. Bobin)		
Plus:				
In the Hands of the Head Hunters (part 11)	Anon. (Cecil Hayter)			
The Union Jack (2nd Series) 741	A Gamble for Life	Anon. (William Murray Graydon)		
Plus:In the Hands of the Head Hunters (part 12)	Anon. (Cecil Hayter)			
The Union Jack (2nd Series) 742	The Case of the Two Financiers	Anon. (E. J. Murray)		
Plus:				
In the Hands of the Head Hunters (part 13)	Anon. (Cecil Hayter)			

== 1918 ==
Publication	Title	Author	Key Characters	Notes
The Boys' Friend Library 433	In the Hands of the Head Hunters	Anon. (Cecil Hayter)	Features Sir Richard Loosely and Lobangu.	
The Sexton Blake Library 47	The Case of the Girl Reporter	Anon. (John W. Bobin)	Glory Gale	
The Sexton Blake Library 48	Ten Days Leave	Anon. (William Murray Graydon)		
The Sexton Blake Library 49	The Case of the Two Brothers	Anon. (Andrew Murray)		
The Sexton Blake Library 50	Whose Was the Hand?	Anon. (William J. Bayfield)		
The Sexton Blake Library 51	In the Shadow of the Guillotine	Anon. (John W. Bobin)	Glory Gale	
The Sexton Blake Library 52	The Mosque of the Mahdi	Anon. (Andrew Murray)	John Lawless	
The Sexton Blake Library 53	The Ordeal of Alick Hillersdon	Anon. (William Murray Graydon)	Cavendish Doyle	
The Sexton Blake Library 54	The Stolen Crown	Anon. (John W. Bobin)	George Marsden Plummer	
The Sexton Blake Library 55	The Missing Ships	Anon. (Andrew Murray)	Count Ivor Carlac, Professor Kew and John Lawless	
The Sexton Blake Library 56	The Great Abduction Mystery	Anon. (William Murray Graydon)	Inspector Widgeon, Cavendish Doyle	
The Sexton Blake Library 57	The Case of the Two Bankers	Anon. (John W. Bobin)	George Marsden Plummer	
The Sexton Blake Library 58	The Reformation of Royce Remington	Anon. (William Murray Graydon)		
The Sexton Blake Library 59	A Matter of Millions	Anon. (William J. Bayfield)		
The Sexton Blake Library 60	The Luck of the Darrells	Anon. (Andrew Murray)	John Lawless	
The Sexton Blake Library 61	Sexton Blake's Vow	Anon. (A. S. Hardy)		
The Sexton Blake Library 62	Camouflage	Anon. (E. W. Alais)		
The Sexton Blake Library 63	The Secret of the Hulk	Anon. (Andrew Murray)		
The Union Jack (2nd Series) 743	The Case of the Hidden Fortune	Anon. (Cecil Hayter)		
Plus:				
In the Hands of the Head Hunters (part 14)	Anon. (Cecil Hayter)			
The Union Jack (2nd Series) 744	The Mystery of the Standard Ships	Anon. (E. J. Murray)		
Plus:				
In the Hands of the Head Hunters (part 15)	Anon. (Cecil Hayter)			
The Union Jack (2nd Series) 745	The Secret of the Allotment	Anon. (E. W. Alais)		
Plus:				
In the Hands of the Head Hunters (part 16)	Anon. (Cecil Hayter)			
The Union Jack (2nd Series) 746	His Lordship's Valet	Anon. (Andrew Murray)		
Plus:				
In the Hands of the Head Hunters (part 17)	Anon. (Cecil Hayter)			
The Union Jack (2nd Series) 747	The Vanished Man	Anon. (Robert Murray Graydon)		
Plus:				
In the Hands of the Head Hunters (part 18)	Anon. (Cecil Hayter)			
The Union Jack (2nd Series) 748	The Oil King's Secret	Anon. (John W. Bobin)		
Plus:				
In the Hands of the Head Hunters (part 19)	Anon. (Cecil Hayter)			
The Union Jack (2nd Series) 749	The Affair of the Premium Bonds	Anon. (E. J. Murray)		
Plus:				
In the Hands of the Head Hunters (part 20)	Anon. (Cecil Hayter)			
The Union Jack (2nd Series) 750	Rescued by Aeroplane	Anon. (Edwy Searles Brooks)		
The Union Jack (2nd Series) 751	The Bogus Bat	Anon. (Robert Murray Graydon)		
Plus:				
In the Hands of the Head Hunters (part 21)	Anon. (Cecil Hayter)			
The Union Jack (2nd Series) 752	The Golden Reef	Anon. (Cecil Hayter)		
Plus:				
In the Hands of the Head Hunters (part 22)	Anon. (Cecil Hayter)			
The Union Jack (2nd Series) 753	The Mystery of the Vlao Vase	Anon. (Robert Murray Graydon)		
Plus:				
In the Hands of the Head Hunters (part 23)	Anon. (Cecil Hayter)			
The Union Jack (2nd Series) 754	The Secret of His Birth	Anon. (William Murray Graydon)		
Plus:				
In the Hands of the Head Hunters (part 24)	Anon. (Cecil Hayter)			
The Union Jack (2nd Series) 755	Absent Without Leave	Anon. (Andrew Murray)		
Plus:				
In the Hands of the Head Hunters (part 25)	Anon. (Cecil Hayter)			
The Union Jack (2nd Series) 756	The Mystery of Alazion	Anon. (Cecil Hayter)		
Plus:				
In the Hands of the Head Hunters (part 26)	Anon. (Cecil Hayter)			
The Union Jack (2nd Series) 757	For Political Reasons	Anon. (E. J. Murray)		
The Union Jack (2nd Series) 758	The Amazing Mystery of Frederick Fennell	Anon. (Robert Murray Graydon)		
The Union Jack (2nd Series) 759	The Tragedy of the Top-Floor Flat	Anon. (William J. Bayfield)		
The Union Jack (2nd Series) 760	A Dead Man's Hate	Anon. (E. J. Murray)		
The Union Jack (2nd Series) 761	The Baker Street Mystery	Anon. (William Murray Graydon)		
The Union Jack (2nd Series) 762	In Sheep's Clothing	Anon. (Andrew Murray)		
The Union Jack (2nd Series) 763	A Mid-Ocean Mystery	Anon. (Robert Murray Graydon)		
The Union Jack (2nd Series) 764	The Learmouth Chambers Mystery	Anon. (Cecil Hayter)		
The Union Jack (2nd Series) 765	A Golden Stratagem	Anon. (E. J. Murray)		
The Union Jack (2nd Series) 766	No. 13 Broughton Square	Anon. (Cecil Hayter)		
The Union Jack (2nd Series) 767	The Lost Letter	Anon. (Robert Murray Graydon)		
The Union Jack (2nd Series) 768	The Mount Stonham Murder Mystery	Anon. (Edwy Searles Brooks)		
The Union Jack (2nd Series) 769	The Shirker	Anon. (William Murray Graydon)		
The Union Jack (2nd Series) 770	The Stolen Negative	Anon. (Andrew Murray)		
The Union Jack (2nd Series) 771	The Mystic Cypher	Anon. (Edwy Searles Brooks)		
The Union Jack (2nd Series) 772	The Mystery of the Appeal Tribunal	Anon. (John W. Bobin)		
The Union Jack (2nd Series) 773	The Clue of the Food Card	Anon. (William Murray Graydon)		
The Union Jack (2nd Series) 774	The Dual Detectives	Anon. (Edwy Searles Brooks)		
The Union Jack (2nd Series) 775	The Case of the Clubfooted Man	Anon. (Robert Murray Graydon)		
The Union Jack (2nd Series) 776	The Case of the Mysterious Book	Anon. (William Murray Graydon)		
The Union Jack (2nd Series) 777	The Flashlight Clue	Anon. (Edwy Searles Brooks)		
The Union Jack (2nd Series) 778	The Vanished Police	Anon. (Robert Murray Graydon)		
The Union Jack (2nd Series) 779	Suspended From Duty	Anon. (Robert Murray Graydon)		
The Union Jack (2nd Series) 780	The Only Clue	Anon. (Robert Murray Graydon)		
The Union Jack (2nd Series) 781	The Case of the American Soldier	Anon. (Edwy Searles Brooks)		
The Union Jack (2nd Series) 782	The Steel Claw	Anon. (Robert Murray Graydon)		
The Union Jack (2nd Series) 783	Behind the Lines	Anon. (William Murray Graydon)		
The Union Jack (2nd Series) 784	The Crooks of Rapid Hollow	Anon. (Edwy Searles Brooks)		
The Union Jack (2nd Series) 785	The Ten Mile Champion	Anon. (Andrew Murray)		
The Union Jack (2nd Series) 786	The Terror of Trevis Wold	Anon. (Edwy Searles Brooks)		
The Union Jack (2nd Series) 787	The Silent Partner	Anon. (Robert Murray Graydon)		
The Union Jack (2nd Series) 788	The Studded Footprints	Anon. (Edwy Searles Brooks)		
The Union Jack (2nd Series) 789	Foes in the Dark	Anon. (William Murray Graydon)		
The Union Jack (2nd Series) 790	The Amazing Affair at Clanmere Mansions	Anon. (Robert Murray Graydon)		
The Union Jack (2nd Series) 791	Dirk Dolland's Redemption	Anon. (Robert Murray Graydon)		
The Union Jack (2nd Series) 792	The Case of the Missing Bolshevik	Anon. (William Murray Graydon)		
The Union Jack (2nd Series) 793	The Case of the Hollow Dagger	Anon. (Edwy Searles Brooks)		
The Union Jack (2nd Series) 794	Waldo the Wonder-Man	Anon. (Edwy Searles Brooks)		

== 1919 ==
Publication	Title	Author	Key Characters	Notes
The Boys' Realm 1	The Brass Disc (part 1)	Anon. (Cecil Hayter)		
The Boys' Realm 2	The Brass Disc (part 2)	Anon. (Cecil Hayter)		
The Boys' Realm 3	The Brass Disc (part 3)	Anon. (Cecil Hayter)		
The Boys' Realm 4	The Brass Disc (part 4)	Anon. (Cecil Hayter)		
Detective Library 10	The Adventure of the Deserted Mine	Anon. (William Murray Graydon)		
Detective Library 11	The Adventure of the Leather Hat Box	Anon. (H. W. Twyman)		
Detective Library 14	The Case of the Kinema King	Anon. (George N. Philips)		
Detective Library 18	The Adventure of the Frozen Room	Anon. (William Murray Graydon)		
Detective Library 19	The Adventure of the Frozen Snake	Anon. (William Murray Graydon)		
The Nelson Lee Library 226	The Mystery of Reed's Wharf	Anon. (Edwy Searles Brooks)		
The Sexton Blake Library 64	The First Born Son	Anon. (Andrew Murray)	Professor Kew, Count Ivor Carlac and John Lawless	
The Sexton Blake Library 65	Salvage of the Sea	Anon. (William Murray Graydon)		
The Sexton Blake Library 66	The Bungalow Tragedy	Anon. (William J. Bayfield)		
The Sexton Blake Library 67	Daylight Robbery	Anon. (John W. Bobin)	Glory Gale	
The Sexton Blake Library 68	The Broken Trail	Anon. (Andrew Murray)	John Lawless and Mandarin Chin-Chin	
The Sexton Blake Library 69	The Island Mystery	Anon. (John W. Bobin)	Aubrey Dexter	
The Sexton Blake Library 70	The Station Master's Secret	Anon. (Andrew Murray)		
The Sexton Blake Library 71	The Hidden Menace	Anon. (John W. Bobin)	Glory Gale	
The Sexton Blake Library 72	Outcasts	Anon. (Andrew Murray)	John Lawless, Professor Kew and Count Ivor Carlac.	
The Sexton Blake Library 73	The Secret of the Mine	Anon. (A. S. Hardy)		
The Sexton Blake Library 74	Across the Divide	Anon. (Andrew Murray)		
The Sexton Blake Library 75	The Mystery of the Grey Car	Anon. (John W. Bobin)		
The Sexton Blake Library 76	A Convict by Proxy	Anon. (Andrew Murray)	John Lawless	
The Sexton Blake Library 77	The Crimson Mask	Anon. (A. S. Hardy)		
The Sexton Blake Library 78	The Five Diamonds	Anon. (William Murray Graydon)		
The Sexton Blake Library 79	The Riddle of Riverdale	Anon. (John W. Bobin)	Gilbert Brand	
The Sexton Blake Library 80	The Bathchair Mystery	Anon. (Andrew Murray)	Nelson Lee	
The Sexton Blake Library 81	The Fourth Theory	Anon. (William J. Bayfield)		
The Sexton Blake Library 82	The Record of the Case	Anon. (William Murray Graydon)		
The Sexton Blake Library 83	The Problem of the Derby Favourite	Anon. (John W. Bobin)		
The Sexton Blake Library 84	Settler or Slaver?	Anon. (Andrew Murray)	John Lawless, Professor Kew and Count Ivor Carlac	
The Sexton Blake Library 85	The Masquerader	Anon. (Robert Murray Graydon)	The Bat	
The Sexton Blake Library 86	The Red Heart of the Incas	Anon. (Jack Lewis)	Leon Kestrel	
The Sexton Blake Library 87	A Sheep in Wolf's Clothing	Anon. (William Murray Graydon)		
The Sexton Blake Library 88	The Mandarin's Seal	Anon. (Andrew Murray)	John Lawless	
The Sexton Blake Library 89	The Mystery of the "Agony" Ad	Anon. (John W. Bobin)	Glory Gale	
The Sexton Blake Library 90	The Case of the Transatlantic Flyers	Anon. (Jack Lewis)	Leon Kestrel	
The Sexton Blake Library 91	The Red Crescent	Anon. (Andrew Murray)	John Lawless	
The Sexton Blake Library 92	The Boy Without a Memory	Anon. (John W. Bobin)	George Marsden Plummer	
The Sexton Blake Library 93	The Case of the Seaside Crooks	Anon. (Andrew Murray)	John Lawless	
The Sexton Blake Library 94	The Affair of the Demobilised Soldier	Anon. (William J. Bayfield)		
The Sexton Blake Library 95	The Kestrel Syndicate	Anon. (Jack Lewis)	Leon Kestrel	
The Sexton Blake Library 96	The Matador's Fortune	Anon. (John W. Bobin)	Leon Kestrel	
The Sexton Blake Library 97	The Case of the Mysterious Jockey	Anon. (William Murray Graydon)		
The Sexton Blake Library 98	The Ex-Soldier Employment Swindle	Anon. (Andrew Murray)	Count Ivor Carlac, Professor Kew and John Lawless	
The Sexton Blake Library 99	The Clue of the Charred Diary	Anon. (William J. Bayfield)		
The Sexton Blake Library 100	Unjustly Branded	Anon. (Reginald H. Poole)		
The Sexton Blake Library 101	Dark Secrets	Anon. (William Murray Graydon)		
The Sexton Blake Library 102	The Case of the Burmese Dagger	Anon. (Andrew Murray)		
The Sexton Blake Library 103	The Stolen Partnership Papers	Anon. (John W. Bobin)		
The Sexton Blake Library 104	Loot!	Anon. (Andrew Murray)		
The Sexton Blake Library 105	Five Years After	Anon. (William Murray Graydon)		
The Sexton Blake Library 106	The Chink in the Armour	Anon. (Jack Lewis)		
The Sexton Blake Library 107	The Branded Spy	Anon. (Oliver Merland)		
The Union Jack (2nd Series) 795	The Moon of the East	Anon. (Cecil Hayter)		
The Union Jack (2nd Series) 796	Hoodwinked! Or, the Diamonds of Zamkala	Anon. (Edwy Searles Brooks)		
The Union Jack (2nd Series) 797	The Clue of the Cuff Link	Anon. (Robert Murray Graydon)	The Bat & The Criminals' Confederation	
The Union Jack (2nd Series) 798	The Case of the Five Hairs	Anon. (Edwy Searles Brooks)		
The Union Jack (2nd Series) 799	The Clue of the Frozen Knife	Anon. (Edwy Searles Brooks)		
The Union Jack (2nd Series) 800	The Affair of the Bronze Monkey	Anon. (Edwy Searles Brooks)		
The Union Jack (2nd Series) 801	The Shanghaied Detective	Anon. (Edwy Searles Brooks)		
The Union Jack (2nd Series) 802	The Case of the Black Feather	Anon. (Robert Murray Graydon)	The Bat & The Criminals' Confederation	
The Union Jack (2nd Series) 803	The Man with Two Lives	Anon. (E. W. Alais)		
The Union Jack (2nd Series) 804	The Sacred Sapphire	Anon. (William J. Bayfield)		
The Union Jack (2nd Series) 805	The Case of the Stacey Rubies	Anon. (Edwy Searles Brooks)		
The Union Jack (2nd Series) 806	The Missing Crooks	Anon. (Robert Murray Graydon)	The Bat & The Criminals' Confederation	
The Union Jack (2nd Series) 807	Tracked by Wireless	Anon. (Robert Murray Graydon)	The Bat & The Criminals' Confederation	
The Union Jack (2nd Series) 808	Held as Hostage!	Anon. (Robert Murray Graydon)	The Bat & The Criminals' Confederation	
The Union Jack (2nd Series) 809	The Castle-Warden	Anon. (Andrew Murray)		
The Union Jack (2nd Series) 810	The Clue of the Second Bullet	Anon. (Edwy Searles Brooks)		
The Union Jack (2nd Series) 811	The Hand in the Shadow	Anon. (William Murray Graydon)		
The Union Jack (2nd Series) 812	The White Liner	Anon. (Robert Murray Graydon)	The Bat & The Criminals' Confederation	
The Union Jack (2nd Series) 813	The Riddle of Quinton Grange	Anon. (Edwy Searles Brooks)		
The Union Jack (2nd Series) 814	Behind the Curtain	Anon. (Andrew Murray)		
The Union Jack (2nd Series) 815	The Strange Case of the Naval Lieutenant	Anon. (Jack Lewis)		
The Union Jack (2nd Series) 816	The Stolen Yacht; or Missing – 1,000,000	Anon. (Robert Murray Graydon)	The Bat & The Criminals' Confederation	
The Union Jack (2nd Series) 817	The Great Spiritualism Case	Anon. (Edwy Searles Brooks)		
The Union Jack (2nd Series) 818	The Hidden Three	Anon. (Cecil Hayter)		
The Union Jack (2nd Series) 819	The Case of the Vanished Guardsman	Anon. (William Murray Graydon)		
The Union Jack (2nd Series) 820	Dirk Dolland's Ordeal	Anon. (Robert Murray Graydon)	The Bat & The Criminals' Confederation	
The Union Jack (2nd Series) 821	The Mystery of Oag Island	Anon. (Andrew Murray)		
The Union Jack (2nd Series) 822	The Smoke Signal	Anon. (Andrew Murray)		
The Union Jack (2nd Series) 823	The Case of the Car Copers	Anon. (Andrew Murray)		
The Union Jack (2nd Series) 824	The Diamond of Disaster	Anon. (Robert Murray Graydon)	The Bat & The Criminals' Confederation	
The Union Jack (2nd Series) 825	The Case of the Decoy	Anon. (Jack Lewis)		
The Union Jack (2nd Series) 826	The Case of the Blank Cheque	Anon. (William Murray Graydon)		
The Union Jack (2nd Series) 827	The World Tour Swindle	Anon. (Andrew Murray)		
The Union Jack (2nd Series) 828	The Oil Seekers	Anon. (William Murray Graydon)		
The Union Jack (2nd Series) 829	Sinister Island	Anon. (Robert Murray Graydon)	The Bat & The Criminals' Confederation	
The Union Jack (2nd Series) 830	The Man from the Sea	Anon. (Robert Murray Graydon)	The Bat & The Criminals' Confederation	
The Union Jack (2nd Series) 831	The Valley of Missing Men	Anon. (Edwy Searles Brooks)		
The Union Jack (2nd Series) 832	The False Clue	Anon. (E. W. Alais)		
The Union Jack (2nd Series) 833	The Riddle of the Rector's Wife	Anon. (Jack Lewis)		
The Union Jack (2nd Series) 834	The Great House-Purchase Fraud	Anon. (Andrew Murray)		
The Union Jack (2nd Series) 835	The Case of the Mormon Son	Anon. (Andrew Murray)		
The Union Jack (2nd Series) 836	The Case of the Four Detectives	Anon. (Jack Lewis)		
The Union Jack (2nd Series) 837	A Duel to the Death	Anon. (George N. Philips)	Notable character debut: Monsieur Zenith	The first appearance of Blake foe Monsieur Zenith Elric's creator Michael Moorcock in turn influenced the re-publication of Skene's sole novel, Monsieur Zenith: The Albino, for which he wrote an introduction, and reused the characters in The Metatemporal Detective. Monsieur Zenith appeared in 84 tales from 1919 to 1943.
The Union Jack (2nd Series) 838	The Trail in the Sand	Anon. (Robert Murray Graydon)	The Bat & The Criminals' Confederation	
The Union Jack (2nd Series) 839	The Case of the Missing Goalkeeper	Anon. (Andrew Murray)		
The Union Jack (2nd Series) 840	The Mystery of the Salt Mine	Anon. (Reginald H. Poole)		
The Union Jack (2nd Series) 841	Mr. Smith of London	Anon. (Robert Murray Graydon)	The Bat & The Criminals' Confederation	
The Union Jack (2nd Series) 842	The Tenth Case	Anon. (George N. Philips)	Monsieur Zenith	
The Union Jack (2nd Series) 843	The Isle of Revenge	Anon. (Jack Lewis)		
The Union Jack (2nd Series) 844	The Case of the Man in Motley	Anon. (George N. Philips)	Monsieur Zenith	
The Union Jack (2nd Series) 845	Presumed Dead	Anon. (Reginald H. Poole)		
The Union Jack (2nd Series) 846	The Mystery of Fiume	Anon. (William Murray Graydon)		

== 1920 Dawn of the Golden Age ==
Publication	Title	Author	Key Characters	Notes
Detective Library 30	The Adventure of the Five Blue Bottles	Anon. (E. J. Murray)		
Detective Library 31	At the Volcano's Brink	Anon. (E. J. Murray)		
Detective Library 32	Kingsmere College: The Trust-Breaker	Anon. (S. G. Shaw)		
Detective Library 33	Kingsmere College: The Master of the Fifth	Anon. (S. G. Shaw)		
Detective Library 34	Kingsmere College: The Madness of Bagley Minor	Anon. (S. G. Shaw)		
Detective Library 35	Kingsmere College: The 'Morse' Code	Anon. (S. G. Shaw)		
Detective Library 36	Kingsmere College: Who Shall Be Captain?	Anon. (S. G. Shaw)		
Detective Library 37	Kingsmere College: Saved by his Fag	Anon. (S. G. Shaw)		
Detective Library 38	Kingsmere College: Tinker Arrested!	Anon. (S. G. Shaw)		
Detective Library 39	Kingsmere College: The Great Barring-Out	Anon. (S. G. Shaw)		
Detective Library 40	Kingsmere College: The Schoolboy Film Actors	Anon. (S. G. Shaw)		
Detective Library 41	Kingsmere College: New Boys at Kingsmere	Anon. (S. G. Shaw)		
Detective Library 42	Kingsmere College: Educating Hodge	Anon. (S. G. Shaw)		
Detective Library 43	Kingsmere College: The End of the Trust	Anon. (S. G. Shaw)		
Detective Library 44	Kingsmere College: A One-Legged Hero)	Anon. (S. G. Shaw)		
Detective Library 45	Kingsmere College: Percy's Night Out)	Anon. (S. G. Shaw)		
Detective Library 46	Kingsmere College: A Plague of Poets)	Anon. (S. G. Shaw)		
Detective Library 47	Kingsmere College: Like Father Like Son	Anon. (S. G. Shaw)		
Detective Library 48	Kingsmere College: Kingsmere's Rebellion)	Anon. (S. G. Shaw)		
Detective Library 49	Kingsmere College: The School on Strike)	Anon. (S. G. Shaw)		
Detective Library 50	Kingsmere College: Goodbye to Kingsmere)	Anon. (S. G. Shaw)		
Nugget Library 24	The Green Emerald	Anon. (Unknown)		
Nugget Weekly 1	The Crescent of Dread (part 1)	Anon. (Edwy Searles Brooks)		
Nugget Weekly 2	The Raid on Carters Bank (part 2)	Anon. (Edwy Searles Brooks)		
Nugget Weekly 3	CD38 or a Bid for Power (part 3)	Anon. (Edwy Searles Brooks)		
Nugget Weekly 4	Check to the Crescent (part 4)	Anon. (Edwy Searles Brooks)		
Nugget Weekly 5	On the Wings of the Air (part 5)	Anon. (Edwy Searles Brooks)		
Nugget Weekly 6	The Winning Hand (part 6)	Anon. (Edwy Searles Brooks)		
Nugget Weekly 7	The Grey Phantom of Beechwood (part 7)	Anon. (Edwy Searles Brooks)		
Nugget Weekly 9	The Fakir's Secret (part 1)	Anon. (Unknown)		
Nugget Weekly 10	The Fakir's Secret (part 2)	Anon. (Unknown)		
Nugget Weekly 11	The Fakir's Secret (part 3)	Anon. (Unknown)		
Nugget Weekly 12	The Fakir's Secret (part 4)	Anon. (Unknown)		
Nugget Weekly 13	The Fakir's Secret (part 5)	Anon. (Unknown)		
Nugget Weekly 14	The Fakir's Secret (part 6)	Anon. (Unknown)		
Nugget Weekly 15	The Fakir's Secret (part 7)	Anon. (Unknown)		
Nugget Weekly 16	The Fakir's Secret (part 8)	Anon. (Unknown)		
Nugget Weekly 17	The Fakir's Secret (part 9)	Anon. (Unknown)		
Nugget Weekly 18	The Fakir's Secret (part 10)	Anon. (Unknown)		
Nugget Weekly 19	The Fakir's Secret (part 11)	Anon. (Unknown)		
Nugget Weekly 20	The Fakir's Secret (part 12)	Anon. (Unknown)		
The Sexton Blake Library 108	The Head Hunter's Secret	Anon. (Andrew Murray)		
The Sexton Blake Library 109	Link by Link	Anon. (John W. Bobin)	George Marsden Plummer	
The Sexton Blake Library 110	The Case of the King's Spy	Anon. (W. W. Sayer)	Notable character debut: Granite Grant	
The Sexton Blake Library 111	The Jewels of Wu Ling	Anon. (Jack Lewis)	Leon Kestrel	
The Sexton Blake Library 112	The Changeling	Anon. (Andrew Murray)	John Lawless	
The Sexton Blake Library 113	The Case of the Bogus Ingots	Anon. (William J. Bayfield)		
The Sexton Blake Library 114	The Hand That Hid in Darkness	Anon. (William Murray Graydon)		
The Sexton Blake Library 115	The Affair of the World's Champion	Anon. (Jack Lewis)	Leon Kestrel	
The Sexton Blake Library 116	Blood-Brotherhood	Anon. (Andrew Murray)	John Lawless	
The Sexton Blake Library 117	The Avenging Seven	Anon. (Leonard H. Brooks)		
The Sexton Blake Library 118	The Trail Under the Sea	Anon. (Reginald H. Poole)	Dr. Lepperman	
The Sexton Blake Library 119	The Case of the Japanese Detective	Anon. (Trevor Wignall)	Features Saburo, the Japanese detective	
The Sexton Blake Library 120	The Admiral's Secret	Anon. (Andrew Murray)		
The Sexton Blake Library 121	Twice Wronged!	Anon. (John W. Bobin)	Markham Dean	
The Sexton Blake Library 122	Shadowed Lives	Anon. (William Murray Graydon)	Basil Wicketshaw	
The Sexton Blake Library 123	The Lincolns Inn Tragedy	Anon. (William J. Bayfield)		
The Sexton Blake Library 124	The Mystery of the Thousand Peaks	Anon. (Andrew Murray)	John Lawless	
The Sexton Blake Library 125	The Case of the Strange Wireless Message	Anon. (W. W. Sayer)	Granite Grant Notable character debut: Mademoiselle Jule	
The Sexton Blake Library 126	The Great Diamond Bluff	Anon. (John W. Bobin)	Hamilton Fayne	
The Sexton Blake Library 127	The Affair of the Oriental Doctor	Anon. (Jack Lewis)	Leon Kestrel	
The Sexton Blake Library 128	The Palzer Experiment	Anon. (Andrew Murray)	John Lawless	
The Sexton Blake Library 129	The Case of the Nameless Man	Anon. (Oliver Merland)	Topper	
The Sexton Blake Library 130	African Gold	Anon. (William Murray Graydon)	Features Basil Wicketshaw and Shumpogaas	Shumpogaas was a Zulu warrior who appeared in Sexton Blake in the Congo back in 1927.
The Sexton Blake Library 131	The Affair of the Blackfriars Financier	Anon. (Leonard H. Brooks)		
The Sexton Blake Library 132	The Man from Kura Kura	Anon. (Andrew Murray)	Features John Lawless	
The Sexton Blake Library 133	The Only Son	Anon. (John W. Bobin)		
The Sexton Blake Library 134	The King's Secret; Plus: The Case of the Exmoor Murder	Anon. (Reginald H. Poole); Anon.	Features Dr. Lepperman and Eldrid Kurtin.	
The Sexton Blake Library 135	The Mystery of the Turkish Agreement	Anon. (W. W. Sayer)	Granite Grant and Mademoiselle Julie	
The Sexton Blake Library 136	The Sheikh's Son	Anon. (Andrew Murray)	John Lawless	
The Sexton Blake Library 137	The Twist in the Trail	Anon. (William J. Bayfield)		The story takes place in Ireland
The Sexton Blake Library 138	The Black Streak; Plus: The Case of the District Messenger Boy	Anon. (William Murray Graydon); Anon.		
The Sexton Blake Library 139	The Kestrel's Claw	Anon. (Jack Lewis)	Leon Kestrel	
The Sexton Blake Library 140	The Beachcomber	Anon. (Andrew Murray)	John Lawless	
The Sexton Blake Library 141	The Mystery of the Living Shadow	Anon. (W. W. Sayer)	Granite Grant and Mademoiselle Julie	
The Sexton Blake Library 142	Out of Reach of the Law	Anon. (John W. Bobin)	George Marsden Plummer and the Council of Nine.	
The Sexton Blake Library 143	The House With the Red Blinds	Anon. (Trevor Wignall)	Features Saburo, the Japanese detective.	
The Sexton Blake Library 144	The Secret of the Hunger Desert	Anon. (Andrew Murray)		
The Sexton Blake Library 145	The Marble-Arch Mystery; Plus: The Footman From France	Anon. (William J. Bayfield); Anon. (Unknown)		
The Sexton Blake Library 146	The Vengeance of Three	Anon. (William Murray Graydon)	Basil Wicketshaw	
The Sexton Blake Library 147	The Mystery of the X.O.4.	Anon. (Jack Lewis)	Leon Kestrel	
The Sexton Blake Library 148	In the Midnight Express	Anon. (Andrew Murray)	Professor Kew and John Lawless	
The Sexton Blake Library 149	The Home of His Childhood	Anon. (William J. Bayfield)		
The Sexton Blake Library 150	His Son's Honour	Anon. (John W. Bobin)	Aubrey Dexter	
The Sexton Blake Library 151	The Mystery Box	Anon. (W. W. Sayer)	Granite Grant and Mademoiselle Julie	
The Sexton Blake Library 152	The Prison Breakers	Anon. (Reginald H. Poole)	Dr. Lepperman and Eldred Kurtin	
The Sexton Blake Library 153	The Secret of the Glacier	Anon. (Andrew Murray)	Trouble Nantucket	
The Sexton Blake Library 154	By the Terms of the Will	Anon. (William Murray Graydon)	Laban Creed	
The Sexton Blake Library 155	The False Alibi	Anon. (Jack Lewis)	The Kestrel Syndicate	
The Union Jack (2nd Series) 847	The League of the Cobblers' Last	Anon. (George N. Philips)	Zenith the Albino	
The Union Jack (2nd Series) 848	Kestrel's Great Bluff	Anon. (Jack Lewis)	Leon Kestrel	
The Union Jack (2nd Series) 849	Tinker's Lone Hand	Anon. (Cecil Hayter)		
The Union Jack (2nd Series) 850	The Case of the Criminal Scientist	Anon. (W. W. Sayer)		
The Union Jack (2nd Series) 851	The Forest of Ghosts	Anon. (Cecil Hayter)	Sir Richard Loosely and Lobangu	
The Union Jack (2nd Series) 852	Double-Crossed	Anon. (Andrew Murray)	Trouble Nantucket	
The Union Jack (2nd Series) 853	The Case of the Vanished Australian	Anon. (William Murray Graydon)		
The Union Jack (2nd Series) 854	The End of the Trail	Anon. (Robert Murray Graydon)		
The Union Jack (2nd Series) 855	The Case of the Rival Promoters	Anon. (John W. Bobin)	George Marsden Plummer	
The Union Jack (2nd Series) 856	The Beggars' Hotel	Anon. (George N. Philips)	Zenith the Albino and Jim the Penman	
The Union Jack (2nd Series) 857	The Mystery of the S.S. Olympic	Anon. (Robert Murray Graydon)		Novelization of the silent film of the same name.
The Union Jack (2nd Series) 858	The Informer	Anon. (Robert Murray Graydon)	The Criminals Confederation	
The Union Jack (2nd Series) 859	The Mystery of the Gnarled Oak	Anon. (Edwy Searles Brooks)	Features detective Nelson Lee	
The Union Jack (2nd Series) 860	The Hidden Headquarters	Anon. (Robert Murray Graydon)	The Criminals' Confederation	
The Union Jack (2nd Series) 861	The Strange Case of the Clyde Emeralds	Anon. (A. C. Murray)		
The Union Jack (2nd Series) 862	Tinker's Big Case	Anon. (Edwy Searles Brooks)		
The Union Jack (2nd Series) 863	The Cargo Stealers	Anon. (Andrew Murray)	Notable character debut: The Owl	
The Union Jack (2nd Series) 864	The Dance of Disaster	Anon. (Jack Lewis)	Leon Kestrel	
The Union Jack (2nd Series) 865	The Clue of the Green Stain	Anon. (Edwy Searles Brooks)	Rupert Waldo	
The Union Jack (2nd Series) 866	The Marley Farm Mystery	Anon. (Cecil Hayter)	Sir Richard Loosely and Lobangu	
The Union Jack (2nd Series) 867	The Five Clues	Anon. (George N. Philips)	Monsieur Zenith	
The Union Jack (2nd Series) 868	The New President	Anon. (Robert Murray Graydon)	The Criminals' Confederation	
The Union Jack (2nd Series) 869	Dirk Dolland's Dilemma	Anon. (Robert Murray Graydon)	The Criminals' Confederation	
The Union Jack (2nd Series) 870	The Mystery of the 9.12 Express	Anon. (Edwy Searles Brooks)	Nelson Lee	
The Union Jack (2nd Series) 871	The Case of the Four Statues	Anon. (George N. Philips)	Zenith the Albino	
The Union Jack (2nd Series) 872	The Clue of the Golden Hair	Anon. (H. Gregory Hill)		
The Union Jack (2nd Series) 873	The Man Who Died	Anon. (Robert Murray Graydon)	The Criminals' Confederation	
The Union Jack (2nd Series) 874	The Chessington Towers Mystery	Anon. (Edwy Searles Brooks)		
The Union Jack (2nd Series) 875	The Death-Spider	Anon. (George N. Philips)	Zenith the Albino	
The Union Jack (2nd Series) 876	The Shadow	Anon. (Robert Murray Graydon)	The Criminals' Confederation	
The Union Jack (2nd Series) 877	The Jewel of Muralpoor	Anon. (Andrew Murray)	John Lawless	
The Union Jack (2nd Series) 878	The Island of Death	Anon. (Cecil Hayter)		
The Union Jack (2nd Series) 879	The Clue of the Death's-Head Moth	Anon. (H. Gregory Hill)		
The Union Jack (2nd Series) 880	The Man in the Smoked Glasses	Anon. (Andrew Murray)	The Owl	
The Union Jack (2nd Series) 881	The Colour Line	Anon. (R. C. Armour)		
The Union Jack (2nd Series) 882	The Man With Two Faces	Anon. (William Murray Graydon)		
The Union Jack (2nd Series) 883	The Mystery of La Perousse	Anon. (Cecil Hayter)	Sir Richard Loosely and Lobangu	
The Union Jack (2nd Series) 884	The Case of the Cotton Syndicate Fraud	Anon. (Andrew Murray)		
The Union Jack (2nd Series) 885	The Heir to Chiverton	Anon. (S. G. Shaw)		
The Union Jack (2nd Series) 886	The Case of the Bogus Judge	Anon. (Jack Lewis)	Leon Kestrel	The introduction of the colour cover.
The Union Jack (2nd Series) 887	The Dog Detective	Anon. (Robert Murray Graydon)	The Criminals' Confederation	
The Union Jack (2nd Series) 888	The Human Link	Anon. (Edwy Searles Brooks)	Rupert Waldo	
The Union Jack (2nd Series) 889	The Case of the Crystal-Gazer	Anon. (George N. Philips)	Monsieur Zenith	
The Union Jack (2nd Series) 890	The Mist of Sleep	Anon. (Jack Lewis)	Leon Kestrel	
The Union Jack (2nd Series) 891	The Case of the Paralysed Man	Anon. (Jack Lewis)	Leon Kestrel	
The Union Jack (2nd Series) 892	The Mystery of the Chinese Antique	Anon. (Edwy Searles Brooks)	Rupert Waldo	
The Union Jack (2nd Series) 893	A Bid for Billions	Anon. (Robert Murray Graydon)	The Criminals' Confederation	
The Union Jack (2nd Series) 894	The Strange Case of the Elsingham Legend	Anon. (George N. Philips)	Zenith the Albino	
The Union Jack (2nd Series) 895	The Extreme Penalty	Anon. (Robert Murray Graydon)	The Criminals' Confederation	
The Union Jack (2nd Series) 896	The Mystery of Littlethake Cottage	Anon. (Cecil Hayter)		
The Union Jack (2nd Series) 897	A Price on His Head	Anon. (Jack Lewis)	Leon Kestrel	
The Union Jack (2nd Series) 898	The Case of the Toxic Tulips	Anon. (George N. Philips)	Monsieur Zenith	

== 1921 ==
Publication	Title	Author	Key Characters	Notes
The Sexton Blake Library 156	The Roumanian Envoy; Plus: On Government Service	Anon. (George N. Philips); Anon. (Unknown)	Monsieur Zenith	
The Sexton Blake Library 157	A Breach of Trust	Anon. (William Murray Graydon)		
The Sexton Blake Library 158	The Case of the Undischarged Bankrupt	Anon. (Andrew Murray)		
The Sexton Blake Library 159	The Case of the Millowner's Son	Anon. (William Murray Graydon)		
The Sexton Blake Library 160	Kestrel's Conspiracy	Anon. (Jack Lewis)	Leon Kestrel	
The Sexton Blake Library 161	The Black Opal Mine; Plus: The Mystery of Matt's Rest	Anon. (Andrew Murray); Anon. (Cecil Hayter)		
The Sexton Blake Library 162	Gipsy or Gentleman	Anon. (William Murray Graydon)		
The Sexton Blake Library 163	The Secret of the Frozen North	Anon. (W. W. Sayer)	Granite Grant and Mademoiselle Julie	
The Sexton Blake Library 164	The Golden Casket; Plus: The Episode of the Black Diamond	Anon. Francis Addington Symonds; Anon. (Cecil Hayter)	Notable character debut: Claire Delisle	
The Sexton Blake Library 165	The Hidden Message	Anon. (Andrew Murray)		
The Sexton Blake Library 166	The Case of the Five Merchants	Anon. (William Murray Graydon)		
The Sexton Blake Library 167	The Gnat	Anon. (Leonard H. Brooks)		
The Sexton Blake Library 168	The Case of the Cinema Star	Anon. (Andrew Murray)		
The Sexton Blake Library 169	The Secret of the Six Black Dots	Anon. (W. W. Sayer)	Granite Grant and Mademoiselle Julie	
The Sexton Blake Library 170	The Affair of the Family Diamonds	Anon. (William J. Bayfield)		
The Sexton Blake Library 171	At the Shrine of Buddha	Anon. (William Murray Graydon)		
The Sexton Blake Library 172	The Lady of Ravensedge	Anon. (Jack Lewis)	Leon Kestrel	
The Sexton Blake Library 173	The Episode of the Stolen Voice	Anon. (R. C. Armour)	Notable character debut: Dr. Ferraro	
The Sexton Blake Library 174	The Man in the Grey Cowl	Anon. (Andrew Murray)		
The Sexton Blake Library 175	The Case of the Island Trader	Anon. (John W. Bobin)		
The Sexton Blake Library 176	The Iron Claw	Anon. (F. A. Symonds)		
The Sexton Blake Library 177	The Case of the Double Tangle	Anon. (William J. Bayfield)		
The Sexton Blake Library 178	The Case for the Prosecution	Anon. (William Murray Graydon)		
The Sexton Blake Library 179	The Case of the Mystery Millionaire	Anon. (Andrew Murray)		
The Sexton Blake Library 180	Thirty Years After	Anon. (William Murray Graydon)		
The Sexton Blake Library 181	The Doctor's Double	Anon. (E. W. Alais)		
The Sexton Blake Library 182	The Case of the Russian Crown Jewels	Anon. (Reginald H. Poole)		
The Sexton Blake Library 183	One of the Flying Squad	Anon. (William Murray Graydon)		
The Sexton Blake Library 184	The City of Apes	Anon. (Andrew Murray)		
The Sexton Blake Library 185	The Man Who Forgot	Anon. (R. C. Armour)		
The Sexton Blake Library 186	Within Fourteen Days	Anon. (William Murray Graydon)		
The Sexton Blake Library 187	The Architect's Secret	Anon. (William J. Bayfield)		
The Sexton Blake Library 188	The Leopard Man	Anon. (R. C. Armour)		
The Sexton Blake Library 189	The Mystery of the Hundred Chests	Anon. (Andrew Murray)		
The Sexton Blake Library 190	The Valley of Fear	Anon. Francis Addington Symonds		
The Sexton Blake Library 191	The Pride of the Stable	Anon. (E. J. Murray)		
The Sexton Blake Library 192	The Sign of the Serpent	Anon. (William Murray Graydon)		
The Sexton Blake Library 193	The Sacred City	Anon. (W. W. Sayer)		
The Sexton Blake Library 194	Marooned!	Anon. (Andrew Murray)		
The Sexton Blake Library 195	State Secrets	Anon. (W. B. Home-Gall)		
The Sexton Blake Library 196	Payment Suspended!	Anon. (John W. Bobin)		
The Sexton Blake Library 197	The Yellow Face	Anon. (William Murray Graydon)		
The Sexton Blake Library 198	The Idol's Eye	Anon. (H. Gregory Hill)	Notable character debut: Gunga Dass	
The Sexton Blake Library 199	Tinker's Lone Hand	Anon. (Andrew Murray)		
The Sexton Blake Library 200	The Four Trails	Anon. (William Murray Graydon)	Basil Wicketshaw	
The Sexton Blake Library 201	False Scents	Anon. (William J. Bayfield)		
The Sexton Blake Library 202	Terror Island; or, The House of Glass	Anon. (R. C. Armour)		
The Sexton Blake Library 203	Ambergris!	Anon. (Andrew Murray)	Jules Vedette	
The Sexton Blake Library 204	The Secret of the Red Mountain	Anon. (W. W. Sayer)	Granite Grant and Mademoiselle Julie	
The Sexton Blake Library 205	Through Fire and Water	Anon. (R. C. Armour)		
The Sexton Blake Library 206	The Case of the Deserted Wife	Anon. (William J. Bayfield)		
The Sexton Blake Library 207	The Green Turban	Anon. (William Murray Graydon)		
The Union Jack (2nd Series) 899	The Turkish Bath Mystery	Anon. (Andrew Murray)		
The Union Jack (2nd Series) 900	The Drington Bank Mystery	Anon. (Reginald H. Poole)		
The Union Jack (2nd Series) 901	Crooked Evidence	Anon. (Robert Murray Graydon)	The Criminals' Confederation	
The Union Jack (2nd Series) 902	The Soho Cafe Mystery	Anon. (Leonard H. Brooks)		
The Union Jack (2nd Series) 903	Iron Island	Anon. (E. J. Murray)		
The Union Jack (2nd Series) 904	The Raven's Prey	Anon. Francis Addington Symonds	Claire Delisle	
The Union Jack (2nd Series) 905	The Case of the Governor's Son	Anon. (Andrew Murray)		
The Union Jack (2nd Series) 906	Trader and Chief	Anon. (William Murray Graydon)		
The Union Jack (2nd Series) 907	The Menace of Rylands Manor	Anon. (Leonard H. Brooks)		
The Union Jack (2nd Series) 908	The Crooks of Monte Carlo	Anon. (W. W. Sayer)		
The Union Jack (2nd Series) 909	The Case of the Chinese Hypnotist	Anon. Francis Addington Symonds	Claire Delisle	
The Union Jack (2nd Series) 910	The Black Duchess	Anon. (Robert Murray Graydon)	The Criminals' Confederation	
The Union Jack (2nd Series) 911	The Green Eye	Anon. (Leonard H. Brooks)		
The Union Jack (2nd Series) 912	The Terms of the Wager	Anon. (Cecil Hayter)		
The Union Jack (2nd Series) 913	The Kestrel's Prey!	Anon. (Jack Lewis)		
The Union Jack (2nd Series) 914	The Judge's Experiment	Anon. (William Murray Graydon)		
The Union Jack (2nd Series) 915	Granite Grant's Mission	Anon. (W. W. Sayer)		
The Union Jack (2nd Series) 916	The Fourth Witness	Anon. (Robert Murray Graydon)	The Criminals' Confederation	
The Union Jack (2nd Series) 917	The Wager of Death	Anon. (Edwy Searles Brooks)		
The Union Jack (2nd Series) 918	The Affair of the Exiled Princess; Plus: The Case of the Yellow Seals	Anon. Francis Addington Symonds; Anon. (unknown)	Claire Delisle	
The Union Jack (2nd Series) 919	The Case of the Thirteenth Bowl	Anon. (George N. Philips)		
The Union Jack (2nd Series) 920	The Convict's Cipher	Anon. (Cecil Hayter)		
The Union Jack (2nd Series) 921	The Strange Case of the Edgware Recluse	Anon. (Leonard H. Brooks)		
The Union Jack (2nd Series) 922	Kestrel's Intrigue	Anon. (Jack Lewis)		
The Union Jack (2nd Series) 923	The Raven and the Ruby	Anon. Francis Addington Symonds	Claire Delisle	
The Union Jack (2nd Series) 924	The Radium Thieves	Anon. (W. W. Sayer)		
The Union Jack (2nd Series) 925	The Saracen's Ring	Anon. (Alfred Edgar)		
The Union Jack (2nd Series) 926	The Artist of Traverne	Anon. (Cecil Hayter)		
The Union Jack (2nd Series) 927	Mr Reece's Million	Anon. (Robert Murray Graydon)	The Criminals' Confederation	
The Union Jack (2nd Series) 928	The Return of Zenith the Albino	Anon. (George N. Philips)		
The Union Jack (2nd Series) 929	Prince Pretence	Anon. (Jack Lewis)		
The Union Jack (2nd Series) 930	Dr Braxland's Experiment	Anon. (Leonard H. Brooks)		
The Union Jack (2nd Series) 931	The Case of the Ampur Carpet	Anon. (Cecil Hayter)		
The Union Jack (2nd Series) 932	The Clue of the Missing Volume	Anon. (Cecil Hayter)		
The Union Jack (2nd Series) 933	The Treasure of Kao Hang	Anon. (Cecil Hayter)		
The Union Jack (2nd Series) 934	The Money Flood	Anon. (Alfred Edgar)		
The Union Jack (2nd Series) 935	The Case of the Channel Swimmer	Anon. (Andrew Murray)		
The Union Jack (2nd Series) 936	Lobangu's Ju-Ju	Anon. (Cecil Hayter)		
The Union Jack (2nd Series) 937	The 'Corner' in Quinine	Anon. (George N. Philips)		
The Union Jack (2nd Series) 938	The Grey Parrot	Anon. Francis Addington Symonds		
The Union Jack (2nd Series) 939	The Clue of the Yellow Dust	Anon. (Leonard H. Brooks)		
The Union Jack (2nd Series) 940	The Fatal Hour	Anon. (S. G. Shaw)		
The Union Jack (2nd Series) 941	Cross Trails	Anon. (Andrew Murray)		
The Union Jack (2nd Series) 942	In the Grip of Waldo	Anon. (Edwy Searles Brooks)		
The Union Jack (2nd Series) 943	The Marsh Farm Mystery	Anon. (Edwy Searles Brooks)		
The Union Jack (2nd Series) 944	In the Midst of Famine	Anon. (Alfred Edgar)		
The Union Jack (2nd Series) 945	Besieged in Malabar	Anon. (William Murray Graydon)		
The Union Jack (2nd Series) 946	Diamond Mad!	Anon. (Robert Murray Graydon)	The Criminals' Confederation	
The Union Jack (2nd Series) 947	His Cousin's Decoy; Plus: Bluffed!	Anon. (R. C. Armour); Anon. (Unknown)		
The Union Jack (2nd Series) 948	The Wonder Man's Challenge	Anon. (Edwy Searles Brooks)		
The Union Jack (2nd Series) 949	The Flower of the Etbaia	Anon. (Cecil Hayter)		
The Union Jack (2nd Series) 950	The Fur Thieves	Anon. (S. G. Shaw)		
The Union Jack (2nd Series) 951	The Case of the Tattooed Dagger	Anon. (W. W. Sayer)		

== 1922 ==
Publication	Title	Author	Key Characters	Notes
Champion Weekly 1	Paid to Lose	A. S. Hardy		
Champion Weekly 7	The Golden Wolf	H. Tremayne (R. C. Armour)		
The Sexton Blake Library 208	The Case of the Cultured Pearls	Anon. (John W. Bobin)	Yvonne Cartier and George Marsden Plummer	
The Sexton Blake Library 209	The Derelicts	Anon. (William Murray Graydon)	Laban Creed, Fenlock Fawn	
The Sexton Blake Library 210	The Motor-Coach Mystery	Anon. (Andrew Murray)	Count Ivor Carlac, Professor Francis Kew	
The Sexton Blake Library 211	The Red Dwarf	Anon. (F. A. Symonds)	Yedax the Dwarf	
The Sexton Blake Library 212	The Power of the Unknown	Anon. (Alfred Edgar)	Foulis Landon	
The Sexton Blake Library 213	The Studio Mystery	Anon. (R. C. Armour)		
The Sexton Blake Library 214	Beyond the Law	Anon. (Andrew Murray)	Humble Begge	
The Sexton Blake Library 215	The Case of the Twisted Trail	Anon. (F. A. Symonds)	Elspeth Drell	
The Sexton Blake Library 216	Sexton Blake in Silesia	Anon. (William Murray Graydon)		
The Sexton Blake Library 217	The Case of the Rajah's Son	Anon. (H. Gregory Hill)	Gunga Dass	
The Sexton Blake Library 218	The Case of the Bendigo Heirloom	Anon. (Jack Lewis)	Leon Kestrel	
The Sexton Blake Library 219	The Ivory Screen	Anon. (George Hamilton Teed)	Dr. Huxton Rymer	
The Sexton Blake Library 220	The Mystery of the Missing Journalist	Anon. (William J. Bayfield)		
The Sexton Blake Library 221	The Phantom of the Pacific	Anon. (W. W. Sayer)	Granite Grant and Mademoiselle Julie	
The Sexton Blake Library 222	The Case of the Unnamed Film	Anon. (Andrew Murray)	John Lawless	
The Sexton Blake Library 223	The Baboon's Paw	Anon. (R. C. Armour)		
The Sexton Blake Library 224	In the Shadow of Night	Anon. (E. W. Alais)		
The Sexton Blake Library 225	The Great Explosion	Anon. (Andrew Murray)		
The Sexton Blake Library 226	The Mystery of the Swamp	Anon. (William Murray Graydon)		
The Sexton Blake Library 227	In the Grip of the Tong	Anon. (John W. Bobin)		
The Sexton Blake Library 228	The Hooded Riders	Anon. (John W. Bobin)		
The Sexton Blake Library 229	The Spirit Smugglers	Anon. (George Hamilton Teed)		
The Sexton Blake Library 230	The Case of the Uncut Gems	Anon. (Andrew Murray)		
The Sexton Blake Library 231	The Mystery of the Sunken Road	Anon. (R. C. Armour)		
The Sexton Blake Library 232	Lawless Justice	Anon. (Alfred Edgar)		
The Sexton Blake Library 233	The Diamond Dragon	Anon. (George Hamilton Teed)		
The Sexton Blake Library 234	The Secret of the Oblong Chest	Anon. (W. W. Sayer)		
The Sexton Blake Library 235	The Taming of Neville Ibbetson	Anon. (William Murray Graydon)		
The Sexton Blake Library 236	The Prisoner of the Kremlin	Anon. (Andrew Murray)		
The Sexton Blake Library 237	The Mill-Pool Mystery	Anon. (Cecil Hayter)		
The Sexton Blake Library 238	The Fallen Star	Anon. (Jack Lewis)		
The Sexton Blake Library 239	The Diamond Flood	Anon. (R. C. Armour)		
The Sexton Blake Library 240	The Case of the Crimson Lizard	Anon. (E. J. Murray)		
The Sexton Blake Library 241	The Trader's Daughter	Anon. (William Murray Graydon)		
The Sexton Blake Library 242	The Case of the Paralysed Man	Anon. (Andrew Murray)		
The Sexton Blake Library 243	The Crimson Domino	Anon. (W. W. Sayer)		
The Sexton Blake Library 244	The House of Ghosts	Anon. (Leonard H. Brooks)		
The Sexton Blake Library 245	The Lama's Secret	Anon. (William Murray Graydon)		
The Sexton Blake Library 246	The Werewolf of Elphinstone	Anon. (R. C. Armour)		
The Sexton Blake Library 247	The Case of the Vanished Husband	Anon. (William J. Bayfield)		
The Sexton Blake Library 248	The Golden Goddess	Anon. (H. Gregory Hill)		
The Sexton Blake Library 249	The Case of the Bogus Laird	Anon. (John W. Bobin)		
The Sexton Blake Library 250	Fingerprints of Fate	Anon. (Leonard H. Brooks)		
The Sexton Blake Library 251	The Brigand's Secret	Anon. (William Murray Graydon)		
The Sexton Blake Library 252	The Mystery of the Clock	Anon. (Andrew Murray)		
The Sexton Blake Library 253	The Case of the Courtlandt Jewels	Anon. (George Hamilton Teed)		
Plus:				
The Affair of the Wandering Musician	Anon. (Unknown)			
The Sexton Blake Library 254	The Sign in the Sky	Anon. (Alfred Edgar)		
The Sexton Blake Library 255	The Albino's Double	Anon. (George N. Philips)		
The Sexton Blake Library 256	By the Skin of His Teeth	Anon. (R. C. Armour)		
The Sexton Blake Library 257	Lost in Cambodia	Anon. (William Murray Graydon)		
Plus:				
The Clue of the Thumb-print	Anon. (Unknown)			
The Sexton Blake Library 258	The Riders of the Sands	Anon. (W. W. Sayer)		
The Sexton Blake Library 259	The Case of the Woman in Black	Anon. (Andrew Murray)		
The Sexton Blake Library 260	The Lighthouse Mystery	Anon. (R. C. Armour)		
The Sexton Blake Library 261	The Earl's Return	Anon. (William Murray Graydon)		
The Sexton Blake Library 262	The Rajah of Ghanapore	Anon. (H. Gregory Hill)		
The Sexton Blake Library 263	The Case of the Trade Secret	Anon. (John W. Bobin)		
The Sexton Blake Library 264	The White Refugees	Anon. (R. C. Armour)		
The Sexton Blake Library 265	On the Bed of the Ocean	Anon. (Edwy Searles Brooks)		
The Sexton Blake Library 266	Lady Sharlaw's Secret	Anon. (William Murray Graydon)		
The Sexton Blake Library 267	The Case of the Amber Crown	Anon. (Andrew Murray)		
The Union Jack (2nd Series) 952	Among the Unemployed	Anon. (Alfred Edgar)		
The Union Jack (2nd Series) 953	Missing at Lloyd's	Anon. (Cecil Hayter)		
The Union Jack (2nd Series) 954	The Case of the Five L's	Anon. (George N. Philips)		
The Union Jack (2nd Series) 955	The Mystery of the Dereland Castle	Anon. (Andrew Murray)		
Plus:				
The Case of the Carmined Cigarette	Anon. (Unknown)			
The Union Jack (2nd Series) 956	Threatened By Three!	Anon. (George N. Philips)		
The Union Jack (2nd Series) 957	The Black Disc	Anon. (W. W. Sayer)		
The Union Jack (2nd Series) 958	The Convict Millionaire	Anon. (George Hamilton Teed)		
The Union Jack (2nd Series) 959	The Case of the Polish Refugee	Anon. (George Hamilton Teed)		
The Union Jack (2nd Series) 960	The Ghosts of Loosely Hall	Anon. (Cecil Hayter)		
The Union Jack (2nd Series) 961	The White Sentinel	Anon. (Jack Lewis)		
The Union Jack (2nd Series) 962	Rupert Waldo – Stuntist	Anon. (Edwy Searles Brooks)		
The Union Jack (2nd Series) 963	The Affair of the Patagonian Devil	Anon. (George Hamilton Teed)		
The Union Jack (2nd Series) 964	A Chinese Puzzle	Anon. (George Hamilton Teed)		
The Union Jack (2nd Series) 965	The Black Vendetta	Anon. (George Hamilton Teed)		
The Union Jack (2nd Series) 966	The Affair of the Sacred Fire	Anon. (George N. Philips)		
The Union Jack (2nd Series) 967	The Case of the Gold-Maker's Secret	Anon. (Alfred Edgar)		
The Union Jack (2nd Series) 968	Sexton Blake – Lumberjack	Anon. (S. G. Shaw)		
The Union Jack (2nd Series) 969	In League Against Him	Anon. (George N. Philips)		
The Union Jack (2nd Series) 970	The Sealed Bride	Anon. (S. G. Shaw)		
The Union Jack (2nd Series) 971	Count Flambert's Crime	Anon. (George Hamilton Teed)		
The Union Jack (2nd Series) 972	The Confederation's Recruit	Anon. (Robert Murray Graydon)	The Criminals' Confederation	
The Union Jack (2nd Series) 973	The Diamond Clue	Anon. (Robert Murray Graydon)	The Criminals' Confederation	
The Union Jack (2nd Series) 974	A Legacy of Death	Anon. (Cecil Hayter)		
The Union Jack (2nd Series) 975	The Case of the Mystery Plantation	Anon. (H. H. Clifford Gibbons)		
The Union Jack (2nd Series) 976	The Case of the Red Parasol	Anon. (W. W. Sayer)		
The Union Jack (2nd Series) 977	The Wireless Telephone Clue	Anon. (George Hamilton Teed)		
The Union Jack (2nd Series) 978	The Case of the Branded Man	Anon. (Alfred Edgar)		
Plus:				
Tinker's Boyhood (part 1)	Anon. (Unknown)			
The Union Jack (2nd Series) 979	The Case of the Bond Street Dentist	Anon. (H. H. Clifford Gibbons)		
Plus:				
Tinker's Boyhood (part 2)	Anon. (Unknown)			
The Union Jack (2nd Series) 980	The Case of the Winfield Handicap	Anon. (George Hamilton Teed)		
Plus:				
Tinker's Boyhood (part 3)	Anon. (Unknown)			
The Union Jack (2nd Series) 981	Sexton Blake's Blunder	Anon. (George Hamilton Teed)		
Plus:				
Tinker's Boyhood (part 4)	Anon. (Unknown)			
The Union Jack (2nd Series) 982	The Affair of the Rickshaw Coolie	Anon. (George Hamilton Teed)		
Plus:				
Tinker's Boyhood (part 5)	Anon. (Unknown)			
The Union Jack (2nd Series) 983	Double Crossed	Anon. (Jack Lewis)		
Plus:				
Tinker's Boyhood (part 6)	Anon. (Unknown)			
The Union Jack (2nd Series) 984	The Voodoo Curse	Anon. (George Hamilton Teed)		
Plus:				
Tinker's Boyhood (part 7)	Anon. (Unknown)			
The Union Jack (2nd Series) 985	The Hunchback of St. Madros	Anon. (Robert Murray Graydon)		
Plus:				
Tinker's Boyhood (part 8)	Anon. (Unknown)			
The Union Jack (2nd Series) 986	The White Rajah	Anon. (George Hamilton Teed)		
Plus:				
Tinker's Boyhood (part 9)	Anon. (Unknown)			
The Union Jack (2nd Series) 987	The Case of the Great St. Leger Fraud	Anon. (H. H. Clifford Gibbons)		
Plus:				
Tinker's Boyhood (part 10)	Anon. (Unknown)			
The Union Jack (2nd Series) 988	Sexton Blake in South America	Anon. (Arkus Sapt)		
Plus:				
Tinker's Boyhood (part 11)	Anon. (Unknown)			
The Union Jack (2nd Series) 989	A Rogue on 'Change	Anon. (John W. Bobin)		
Plus:				
Tinker's Boyhood (part 12)	Anon. (Unknown)			
The Union Jack (2nd Series) 990	The Broken Circle	Anon. (George Hamilton Teed)		
Plus:				
Tinker's Boyhood (part 13)	Anon. (Unknown)			
The Union Jack (2nd Series) 991	The Bandits of Bruyeres	Anon. (George Hamilton Teed)		
Plus:				
Tinker's Boyhood (part 14)	Anon. (Unknown)			
The Union Jack (2nd Series) 992	Sexton Blake – Gun-Runner	Anon. (Cecil Hayter)		
Plus:				
Tinker's Boyhood (part 15)	Anon. (Unknown)			
The Union Jack (2nd Series) 993	The Clue of the White Feather	Anon. (W. W. Sayer)		
Plus:				
Tinker's Boyhood (part 16)	Anon. (Unknown)			
The Union Jack (2nd Series) 994	The Soap Salvors	Anon. (George Hamilton Teed)		
Plus:				
Tinker's Boyhood (part 17)	Anon. (Unknown)			
The Union Jack (2nd Series) 995	Eyes in the Dark	Anon. (Andrew Murray)		
Plus:				
Tinker's Boyhood (part 18)	Anon. (Unknown)			
The Union Jack (2nd Series) 996	The Case of the Attwell Aircraft Company	Anon. (George N. Philips)		
Plus:				
Tinker's Boyhood (part 19)	Anon. (Unknown)			
The Union Jack (2nd Series) 997	The Mystery of the Big Woods	Anon. (George Hamilton Teed)		
Plus:				
Tinker's Boyhood (part 20)	Anon. (Unknown)			
The Union Jack (2nd Series) 998	The Case of the Doped Favourites	Anon. (John W. Bobin)		
Plus:				
Tinker's Boyhood (part 21)	Anon. (Unknown)			
The Union Jack (2nd Series) 999	The Burlington Collar Mystery	Anon. (Leonard H. Brooks)		
Plus:				
Tinker's Boyhood (part 22)	Anon. (Unknown)			
The Union Jack (2nd Series) 1,000	The Thousandth Chance	Anon. (George Hamilton Teed)		
Plus:				
Tinker's Boyhood (part 23)	Anon. (Unknown)			
The Union Jack (2nd Series) 1,001	The Diamond Special	Anon. (George Hamilton Teed)		
Plus:				
Tinker's Boyhood (part 24)	Anon. (Unknown)			
The Union Jack (2nd Series) 1,002	The Case of the Prodigal Father	Anon. (E. J. Murray)		
Plus:				
Tinker's Boyhood (part 25)	Anon. (Unknown)			
The Union Jack (2nd Series) 1,003	The Case of the Blind Beggar	Anon. (William Murray Graydon)		
Plus:				
Tinker's Boyhood (part 26)	Anon. (Unknown)			

== 1923 ==
Publication	Title	Author	Key Characters	Notes
The Magnet 818	Disgraced By His Father!	Frank Richards (Noel Wood-Smith)		
The Sexton Blake Library 268	The Secret of the Safe	Anon. (Alfred Edgar)		
The Sexton Blake Library 269	The Mystery of Glyn Castle	Anon. (Leonard H. Brooks)		
The Sexton Blake Library 270	The Affair of the Seven Mummy Cases	Anon. (William J. Bayfield)		
The Sexton Blake Library 271	The Secret Emerald Mines	Anon. (George Hamilton Teed)		
The Sexton Blake Library 272	The Case of the 'Wizard' Jockey	Anon. (William J. Bayfield)		
The Sexton Blake Library 273	'North of 55'	Anon. (Andrew Murray)		
The Sexton Blake Library 274	The Green Eyes	Anon. (Edwy Searles Brooks)		
The Sexton Blake Library 275	The Case of the Island Princess	Anon. (R. C. Armour)		
The Sexton Blake Library 276	A Legacy of Vengeance	Anon. (John W. Bobin)		
The Sexton Blake Library 277	The Oyster-Bed Mystery	Anon. (Andrew Murray)		
The Sexton Blake Library 278	The Case of the Cabaret Girl	Anon. (W. W. Sayer)		
The Sexton Blake Library 279	The Case of the Cotton Beetle	Anon. (Andrew Murray)		
The Sexton Blake Library 280	The Sun God	Anon. (R. C. Armour)		
The Sexton Blake Library 281	The Face in the Film	Anon. (Oliver Merland)		
The Sexton Blake Library 282	The House At Waterloo	Anon. (Edwy Searles Brooks)		
The Sexton Blake Library 283	The Eight Pointed Star	Anon. (George Hamilton Teed)		
The Sexton Blake Library 284	In Darkest Madras	Anon. (H. Gregory Hill)		
The Sexton Blake Library 285	The Case of the Four Barons	Anon. (William Murray Graydon)		
The Sexton Blake Library 286	The Secret of Thurlston Towers	Anon. (Leonard H. Brooks)		
The Sexton Blake Library 287	The Outlaw of Yugo-Slavia	Anon. (W. W. Sayer)		
The Sexton Blake Library 288	Down East	Anon. (William Murray Graydon)		
The Sexton Blake Library 289	The Great Revue Mystery	Anon. (H. H. Clifford Gibbons)		
The Sexton Blake Library 290	The Last Clue	Anon. (William J. Bayfield)		
The Sexton Blake Library 291	The Man Behind the Curtain	Anon. (Andrew Murray)		
The Sexton Blake Library 292	In Savage Hayti	Anon. (R. C. Armour)		
The Sexton Blake Library 293	The Mystery Mandarin	Anon. (John W. Bobin)		
The Sexton Blake Library 294	The Arctic Trail	Anon. (William Murray Graydon)		
The Sexton Blake Library 295	The Actor's Secret	Anon. (H. Gregory Hill)		
The Sexton Blake Library 296	The House of Fear	Anon. (Jack Lewis)		
The Sexton Blake Library 297	The Mystery of the Dover Road	Anon. (William Murray Graydon)		
The Sexton Blake Library 298	The Secret of the Lagoon	Anon. (R. C. Armour)		
The Sexton Blake Library 299	The Crook's Double	Anon. (Andrew Murray)		
The Sexton Blake Library 300	The Case of the Five Dummy Books	Anon. (W. W. Sayer)		
The Sexton Blake Library 301	The Doctor's Secret	Anon. (William J. Bayfield)		
The Sexton Blake Library 302	The Case of the Adopted Daughter	Anon. (William Murray Graydon)		
The Sexton Blake Library 303	The Lost Expedition	Anon. (W. W. Sayer)		Read it for free online at Comic Book Plus
The Sexton Blake Library 304	Solved in Thirty-six Hours	Anon. (H. H. Clifford Gibbons)		Read it for free online at Comic Book Plus
The Sexton Blake Library 305	The Mansion of Shadows	Anon. (E. J. Murray)		
The Sexton Blake Library 306	The Shield of the Law	Anon. (William Murray Graydon)		
The Sexton Blake Library 307	The Crimson Belt	Anon. (George Hamilton Teed)		
The Sexton Blake Library 308	The Case of the Master Organiser	Anon. (Andrew Murray)		
The Sexton Blake Library 309	The Desert Trail	Anon. (R. C. Armour)		
The Sexton Blake Library 310	The Path of Fear	Anon. (William Murray Graydon)		
The Sexton Blake Library 311	The Case of the Man in Black	Anon. (Oliver Merland)		
The Sexton Blake Library 312	The Orloff Diamond	Anon. (George Hamilton Teed)		
The Sexton Blake Library 313	The Affair of the Three Gunmen	Anon. (William Murray Graydon)		
The Sexton Blake Library 314	The Case of the Mysterious Germs	Anon. (R. C. Armour)		
The Union Jack (2nd Series) 1,004	The Palace of Mystery	Anon. (George Hamilton Teed)		
Plus:				
Tinker's Boyhood (part 26)	Anon. (Unknown)			
The Union Jack (2nd Series) 1,005	The Case of the Stolen Locomotives	Anon. (H. Gregory Hill)		
Plus:				
Tinker's Boyhood (part 27)	Anon. (Unknown)			
The Union Jack (2nd Series) 1,006	The Return of Gunga Dass	Anon. (H. Gregory Hill)		
Plus:				
Tinker's Boyhood (part 28)	Anon. (Unknown)			
The Union Jack (2nd Series) 1,007	The Temple of the Blind	Anon. (Andrew Murray)		
Plus:				
Tinker's Boyhood (part 29)	Anon. (Unknown)			
The Union Jack (2nd Series) 1,008	A Strange Legacy	Anon. (George Hamilton Teed)		
Plus:				
Tinker's Boyhood (part 30)	Anon. (Unknown)			
The Union Jack (2nd Series) 1,009	The Case of the Bamboo Rods	Anon. (Andrew Murray)		
Plus:				
Tinker's Boyhood (part 31)	Anon. (Unknown)			
The Union Jack (2nd Series) 1,010	The Secret of the Mine	Anon. (Andrew Murray)		
Plus:				
Tinker's Boyhood (part 32)	Anon. (Unknown)			
The Union Jack (2nd Series) 1,011	The Vengeance of the Black Eight	Anon. (W. W. Sayer)		
Plus:				
Tinker's Boyhood (part 33)	Anon. (Unknown)			
The Union Jack (2nd Series) 1,012	The Case of the Petrol Turbine	Anon. (H. H. Clifford Gibbons)		
The Union Jack (2nd Series) 1,013	On Secret Service	Anon. (George N. Philips)		
The Union Jack (2nd Series) 1,014	The Pearls of Benjemasin	Anon. (George Hamilton Teed)		
The Union Jack (2nd Series) 1,015	The Painted Window	Anon. (George Hamilton Teed)		
The Union Jack (2nd Series) 1,016	The Brand of the I. D. B.	Anon. (George Hamilton Teed)		
The Union Jack (2nd Series) 1,017	The Case of the Indian Fakir	Anon. (George Hamilton Teed)		
The Union Jack (2nd Series) 1,018	The Sceptre of Solomon	Anon. (George Hamilton Teed)		
The Union Jack (2nd Series) 1,019	The Valley of Flies	Anon. (Andrew Murray)		
The Union Jack (2nd Series) 1,020	The Mystery of the Moving Mountain	Anon. (George Hamilton Teed)		
The Union Jack (2nd Series) 1,021	The Adventure of the Renegade Spy	Anon. (H. Gregory Hill)		
The Union Jack (2nd Series) 1,022	The Case of the Crimson Curtain	Anon. (George N. Philips)		
The Union Jack (2nd Series) 1,023	The Tabu of Confucius	Anon. (George Hamilton Teed)		
The Union Jack (2nd Series) 1,024	The Return of Beaudelaire	Anon. (Jack Lewis)		
The Union Jack (2nd Series) 1,025	Plague!	Anon. (George N. Philips)		
The Union Jack (2nd Series) 1,026	The Slave of the Thieves' Market	Anon. (George Hamilton Teed)		
The Union Jack (2nd Series) 1,027	The Case of Tinker's Tourist Trophy	Anon. (H. H. Clifford Gibbons)		
The Union Jack (2nd Series) 1,028	Tinker — Wireless Operator	Anon. (George Hamilton Teed)		
The Union Jack (2nd Series) 1,029	The Battle of Brooklands	Anon. (Alfred Edgar)		
The Union Jack (2nd Series) 1,030	The Case of the Professional Tennis Player	Anon. (Andrew Murray)		
The Union Jack (2nd Series) 1,031	The Adventure of the Giant Bean	Anon. (George Hamilton Teed)		
The Union Jack (2nd Series) 1,032	The Imposter of the North-West Mounted	Anon. (S. G. Shaw)		
The Union Jack (2nd Series) 1,033	The Hyena of Paris	Anon. (George Hamilton Teed)		
The Union Jack (2nd Series) 1,034	The Case of the Steel-Lined Room	Anon. (Richard Goyne)		
The Union Jack (2nd Series) 1,035	The Affair of the Lacquered Walnut	Anon. (George Hamilton Teed)		
The Union Jack (2nd Series) 1,036	The Mystery of the Chateau Bleu	Anon. (W. W. Sayer)		
The Union Jack (2nd Series) 1,037	The Man with the Limp	Anon. (H. Gregory Hill)		
The Union Jack (2nd Series) 1,038	X-Ine or the Case of the Green Crystals	Anon. (George N. Philips)		
The Union Jack (2nd Series) 1,039	The Gargoyle's Secret	Anon. (Andrew Murray)		
The Union Jack (2nd Series) 1,040	Bail Up!	Anon. (S. G. Shaw)		
The Union Jack (2nd Series) 1,041	The Hawk of the Peak	Anon. (George Hamilton Teed)		
The Union Jack (2nd Series) 1,042	The Case of the Crippled Monk	Anon. (George Hamilton Teed)		
The Union Jack (2nd Series) 1,043	The Case of the Golden Pebble	Anon. (George Hamilton Teed)		
The Union Jack (2nd Series) 1,044	The Living Mask!	Anon. (George N. Philips)		
The Union Jack (2nd Series) 1,045	The Case of the Kidnapped Pianist	Anon. (H. H. Clifford Gibbons)		
The Union Jack (2nd Series) 1,046	Bandits of the Blue	Anon. (Alfred Edgar)		
The Union Jack (2nd Series) 1,047	Huxton Rymer — President	Anon. (George Hamilton Teed)		
The Union Jack (2nd Series) 1,048	The Black Eagle	Anon. (George Hamilton Teed)		
The Union Jack (2nd Series) 1,049	The Straits of Mystery	Anon. (George Hamilton Teed)		
The Union Jack (2nd Series) 1,050	The Case of the Six Rubber Balls	Anon. (George Hamilton Teed)		
The Union Jack (2nd Series) 1,051	The Case of the Phantom Frying-Pan	Anon. (S. G. Shaw)		
The Union Jack (2nd Series) 1,052	The Devil Woman of the Malaki	Anon. (S. G. Shaw)		
The Union Jack (2nd Series) 1,053	The Shadow of the Past	Anon. (Jack Lewis)		
The Union Jack (2nd Series) 1,054	The Flaming Spectre of Cloome	Anon. (Edwy Searles Brooks)		
The Union Jack (2nd Series) 1,055	The Scarab of Ament-Oba	Anon. (Dr. William Jago)		

== 1924 ==
Publication	Title	Author	Key Characters	Notes
The Sexton Blake Library 315	The Secret of the Carpathians	Anon. (H. H. Clifford Gibbons)		
The Sexton Blake Library 316	The Mawpeth Millions	Anon. (Warwick Reynolds)		
The Sexton Blake Library 317	The Shrine of Kali	Anon. (H. Gregory Hill)		
The Sexton Blake Library 318	The Secret of the Black Wallet	Anon. (W. W. Sayer)		
The Sexton Blake Library 319	The Great Museum Mystery	Anon. (H. Gregory Hill)		
The Sexton Blake Library 320	The Case of the Income-Tax Frauds	Anon. (William J. Bayfield)		
The Sexton Blake Library 321	In Double Disguise	Anon. (William Murray Graydon)		
The Sexton Blake Library 322	The Case of the Millionaire Newspaper Owner	Anon. (R. C. Armour)		
The Sexton Blake Library 323	The Case of the Head Dispenser	Anon. (John W. Bobin)		
The Sexton Blake Library 324	The Mystery of Rodney's Cove	Anon. (Edwy Searles Brooks)		
The Sexton Blake Library 325	The Great Ivory Swindle	Anon. (George Hamilton Teed)		
The Sexton Blake Library 326	The Case of the Millionaire Blackmailer	Anon. (William J. Bayfield)		
The Sexton Blake Library 327	The Case of the Eccentric Will	Anon. (R. C. Armour)		
The Sexton Blake Library 328	The Farrowshot Park Affair	Anon. (William J. Bayfield)		
The Sexton Blake Library 329	The Third Key	Anon. (H. H. Clifford Gibbons)		
The Sexton Blake Library 330	The Vanished Million	Anon. (W. W. Sayer)		
The Sexton Blake Library 331	The Great Circus Mystery	Anon. (E. J. Murray)		
The Sexton Blake Library 332	The Secret Millionaire	Anon. (H. H. Clifford Gibbons)		
The Sexton Blake Library 333	The Human Bloodhound	Anon. (Edwy Searles Brooks)		
The Sexton Blake Library 334	The Platinum Smugglers	Anon. (R. C. Armour)		
The Sexton Blake Library 335	The Loot of the Nana Sahib	Anon. (H. Gregory Hill)		
The Sexton Blake Library 336	The Boarding House Mystery	Anon. (Edwy Searles Brooks)		
The Sexton Blake Library 337	An Amateur in Crime	Anon. (William Murray Graydon)		
The Sexton Blake Library 338	The Brixham Manor Mystery	Anon. (Edwy Searles Brooks)		
The Sexton Blake Library 339	The Case of the Kidnapped Legatee	Anon. (R. C. Armour)		
The Sexton Blake Library 340	Flat Number 4	Anon. (William J. Bayfield)		
The Sexton Blake Library 341	The Gamekeeper's Secret	Anon. (William Murray Graydon)		
The Sexton Blake Library 342	The Case of Larachi the Lascar	Anon. (Oliver Merland)		
The Sexton Blake Library 343	The King's Secret	Anon. (H. H. Clifford Gibbons)		
The Sexton Blake Library 344	The Case of the Two Guardians	Anon. (William Murray Graydon)		
The Sexton Blake Library 345	The Secret of the Bucket Shop	Anon. (J. G. Jones)		
The Sexton Blake Library 346	Certified Insane!	Anon. (R. C. Armour)		
The Sexton Blake Library 347	The Curious Case of the Crook's Memoirs	Anon. (William Murray Graydon)		
The Sexton Blake Library 348	The Adventure of the Oil Pirates	Anon. (R. C. Armour)		
The Sexton Blake Library 349	The Case of the Rival Race Gangs	Anon. (H. Crichton Miln)		
The Sexton Blake Library 350	The Strange Case of Habberton's Mill	Anon. (William J. Bayfield)		
The Sexton Blake Library 351	The Affair of the Country Club	Anon. (H. H. Clifford Gibbons)		
The Sexton Blake Library 352	The Forest of Fortune	Anon. (W. W. Sayer)		
The Sexton Blake Library 353	The Prisoner of Ellis Island	Anon. (William Murray Graydon)		
The Sexton Blake Library 354	The Old Tollgate Tragedy	Anon. (William J. Bayfield)		
The Sexton Blake Library 355	The Secret People	Anon. (H. H. Clifford Gibbons)		
The Sexton Blake Library 356	The Case of the Clairvoyant's Ruse	Anon. (George Hamilton Teed)		
The Sexton Blake Library 357	The Mystery of the Abandoned Cottage	Anon. (William Murray Graydon)		
The Sexton Blake Library 358	The Trail of the Tiger	Anon. (R. C. Armour)		
The Sexton Blake Library 359	Next of Kin	Anon. (William Murray Graydon)		
The Sexton Blake Library 360	The Case of the Jade-Handled Knife	Anon. (George Hamilton Teed)		
The Sexton Blake Library 361	In the Land of the Riffs	Anon. (William Murray Graydon)		
The Sexton Blake Library 362	The Case of the Sleeping Partner	Anon. (Edwy Searles Brooks)		
The Union Jack (2nd Series) 1,056	The Return of Mr Reece	Anon. (Robert Murray Graydon)	The Criminals' Confederation	
The Union Jack (2nd Series) 1,057	The Golden Lotus	Anon. (H. Gregory Hill)		
The Union Jack (2nd Series) 1,058	The Medium of Portman Square	Anon. (Richard Goyne)		
The Union Jack (2nd Series) 1,059	On the Right Hand Wall	Anon. (W. W. Sayer)		
The Union Jack (2nd Series) 1,060	The House in the Maze	Anon. (W. J. Lomax)		
The Union Jack (2nd Series) 1,061	The Spider's Web	Anon. (Robert Murray Graydon)	The Criminals' Confederation	
The Union Jack (2nd Series) 1,062	The Case of the Haunted Works	Anon. (H. H. Clifford Gibbons)		
The Union Jack (2nd Series) 1,063	The Sign of the Yellow Dragon	Anon. (Andrew Murray)	The Owl	This was Andrew Murray's last Sexton Blake tale.
The Union Jack (2nd Series) 1,064	The Street of Many Lanterns	Anon. (George Hamilton Teed)		
The Union Jack (2nd Series) 1,065	The Train of Tragedy	Anon. (George N. Philips)		
The Union Jack (2nd Series) 1,066	The Green Portfolio	Anon. (George Hamilton Teed)		
The Union Jack (2nd Series) 1,067	The Mummy's Twin	Anon. (George Hamilton Teed)		
The Union Jack (2nd Series) 1,068	The Mystery of the Mask of Mirth	Anon. (Walter Shute)		
The Union Jack (2nd Series) 1,069	The Secret of the Sarcophagus	Anon. (John W. Bobin)		
The Union Jack (2nd Series) 1,070	The Key Man of the Confederation	Anon. (Robert Murray Graydon)	The Criminals' Confederation	
The Union Jack (2nd Series) 1,071	The Time Killer	Anon. (Gwyn Evans)		
The Union Jack (2nd Series) 1,072	The Panic Maker	Anon. (S. G. Shaw)		
The Union Jack (2nd Series) 1,073	The Case of Cormack's Key	Anon. (H. W. Twyman)		
The Union Jack (2nd Series) 1,074	Graft!	Anon. (H. H. Clifford Gibbons)		
The Union Jack (2nd Series) 1,075	The Strangle-Hold	Anon. (H. H. Clifford Gibbons)		
The Union Jack (2nd Series) 1,076	The Syndicate for Sale or Kestrel Betrayed	Anon. (Jack Lewis)		
The Union Jack (2nd Series) 1,077	The Electric Man	Anon. (Edwy Searles Brooks)		
The Union Jack (2nd Series) 1,078	The Great Wembley Mystery	Anon. (H. H. Clifford Gibbons)		
The Union Jack (2nd Series) 1,079	Plummer's Missing Million	Anon. (Walter Shute)		
The Union Jack (2nd Series) 1,080	The Case of the Lost Lobangu	Anon. (John W. Wheway)		
The Union Jack (2nd Series) 1,081	The Lizard Man	Anon. (George Hamilton Teed)		
The Union Jack (2nd Series) 1,082	The Strange Case of the Jig-Saw Puzzle	Anon. (George N. Philips)		
The Union Jack (2nd Series) 1,083	The Quest of the Jewelled Globe	Anon. (George Hamilton Teed)		
The Union Jack (2nd Series) 1,084	The Strange Case of the Runaway Surgeon	Anon. (Jack Lewis)		
The Union Jack (2nd Series) 1,085	The Rival Presidents	Anon. (Robert Murray Graydon )	The Criminals' Confederation	
The Union Jack (2nd Series) 1,086	The Case of the Strange Sickness	Anon. (George Hamilton Teed)		
The Union Jack (2nd Series) 1,087	The Mystery of the Random Bullet	Anon. (W. W. Sayer)		
The Union Jack (2nd Series) 1,088	The Trail of Broken Men	Anon. (S. G. Shaw)		
The Union Jack (2nd Series) 1,089	The Case of the Missing Athlete	Anon. (George Hamilton Teed)		
The Union Jack (2nd Series) 1,090	Rogues of the 'Revontazin'	Anon. (George Hamilton Teed)		
The Union Jack (2nd Series) 1,091	The Man in Steel	Anon. (George N. Philips)		
The Union Jack (2nd Series) 1,092	The Secret of the Bottle	Anon. (George Hamilton Teed)		
The Union Jack (2nd Series) 1,093	Plummer's Death-Ray	Anon. (Walter Shute)		
The Union Jack (2nd Series) 1,094	Reece on the Run!	Anon. (Robert Murray Graydon)	The Criminals' Confederation	
The Union Jack (2nd Series) 1,095	The Adventure of the Black Spider	Anon. (D. Thomas)		
The Union Jack (2nd Series) 1,096	The Affair of the Yellow Bricks	Anon. (George Hamilton Teed)		
The Union Jack (2nd Series) 1,097	The Mandarin's Millions	Anon. (Robert Murray Graydon)	The Criminals' Confederation	
The Union Jack (2nd Series) 1,098	The Wizard of Wurtz	Anon. (George N. Philips)		
The Union Jack (2nd Series) 1,099	The Law of the Claw	Anon. (Jack Lewis)		
The Union Jack (2nd Series) 1,100	The Latin Quarter Mysteries	Anon. (George Hamilton Teed)		
The Union Jack (2nd Series) 1,101	Black Magic	Anon. (Gwyn Evans)		
The Union Jack (2nd Series) 1,102	The Fog-Fiends	Anon. (H. H. Clifford Gibbons)		
The Union Jack (2nd Series) 1,103	The Clayton Moat Mystery	Anon. (W. W. Sayer)		
The Union Jack (2nd Series) 1,104	The Leopard of Droone	Anon. (Edwy Searles Brooks)		
The Union Jack (2nd Series) 1,105	Sexton Blake's Xmas Truce	Anon. (George Hamilton Teed)		
The Union Jack (2nd Series) 1,106	The Kentish Smugglers	Anon. (S. G. Shaw)		
The Union Jack (2nd Series) 1,107	The Secret of the Dutch Garden	Anon. (Augustus Baker)		

== 1925 ==
Publication	Title	Author	Key Characters	Notes
The Nelson Lee Library 537	The City of Masks (part 1)	Anon. (E. J. Murray)		
The Nelson Lee Library 538	The City of Masks (part 2)	Anon. (E. J. Murray)		
The Nelson Lee Library 539	The City of Masks (part 3)	Anon. (E. J. Murray)		
The Nelson Lee Library 540	The City of Masks (part 4)	Anon. (E. J. Murray)		
The Nelson Lee Library 541	The City of Masks (part 5)	Anon. (E. J. Murray)		
The Nelson Lee Library 542	The City of Masks (part 6)	Anon. (E. J. Murray)		
The Nelson Lee Library 543	The City of Masks (part 7)	Anon. (E. J. Murray)		
The Nelson Lee Library 544	The City of Masks (part 8)	Anon. (E. J. Murray)		
The Nelson Lee Library 545	The City of Masks (part 9)	Anon. (E. J. Murray)		
The Nelson Lee Library 546	The City of Masks (part 10)	Anon. (E. J. Murray)		
The Nelson Lee Library 547	The City of Masks (part 11)	Anon. (E. J. Murray)		
The Nelson Lee Library 548	The City of Masks (part 12)	Anon. (E. J. Murray)		
The Nelson Lee Library 549	The City of Masks (part 13)	Anon. (E. J. Murray)		
The Nelson Lee Library 550	The City of Masks (part 14)	Anon. (E. J. Murray)		
The Nelson Lee Library 551	The City of Masks (part 15)	Anon. (E. J. Murray)		
The Sexton Blake Library 363	The Mystery of the Lost Battleship	Anon. (W. W. Sayer)		
The Sexton Blake Library 364	The Crook of Mayfair	Anon. (H. H. Clifford Gibbons)		
The Sexton Blake Library 365	His Father's Crime	Anon. (William Murray Graydon)		
The Sexton Blake Library 366	The Mystery of the Seine	Anon. (George Hamilton Teed)		
The Sexton Blake Library 367	The Case of the Red Cremonas	Anon. (H. H. Clifford Gibbons)		
The Sexton Blake Library 368	The Secret of the Mansions	Anon. (William J. Bayfield)		
The Sexton Blake Library 369	Missing in Mexico	Anon. (J. N. Pentelow)		
The Sexton Blake Library 370	The Amazing Affair of the Renegade Prince	Anon. (George N. Philips)		
The Sexton Blake Library 371	The Case of the Pink Macaw	Anon. (George Hamilton Teed)		
The Sexton Blake Library 372	By Order of the Soviet	Anon. (F. A. Symonds)		
The Sexton Blake Library 373	The Clue of the Cloak-Room Ticket	Anon. (R. C. Armour)		
The Sexton Blake Library 374	In the Night Watch	Anon. (Edwy Searles Brooks)		
The Sexton Blake Library 375	The Riddle of the Registry Office	Anon. (H. H. Clifford Gibbons)		
The Sexton Blake Library 376	Held in Trust	Anon. (William Murray Graydon)		
The Sexton Blake Library 377	The Secret of Thirty Years	Anon. (W. W. Sayer)		
The Sexton Blake Library 378	The Case of the Golden Stool	Anon. (F. A. Symonds)		
The Sexton Blake Library 379	Limited Liability	Anon. (H. H. Clifford Gibbons)		
The Sexton Blake Library 380	By Order of the King	Anon. (William Murray Graydon)		
The Sexton Blake Library 381	The Mystery of the Pot-Bank	Anon. (William J. Bayfield)		
The Sexton Blake Library 382	The Trainer's Secret	Anon. (A. S. Hardy)		
The Sexton Blake Library (2nd Series) 1	The Secret of the Coconut Groves	Anon. (George Hamilton Teed)		
The Sexton Blake Library (2nd Series) 2	The Adventure of the Annamese Prince	Anon. (William Murray Graydon)		
The Sexton Blake Library (2nd Series) 3	The Case of the Deported Aliens	Anon. (William J. Bayfield)		
The Sexton Blake Library (2nd Series) 4	The Yellow Cat	Anon. (H. H. Clifford Gibbons)		
The Sexton Blake Library (2nd Series) 5	The Mystery of the Platinum Nugget!	Anon. (W. W. Sayer)		
The Sexton Blake Library (2nd Series) 6	The Case of the Nawab's Son	Anon. (William Murray Graydon)		
The Sexton Blake Library (2nd Series) 7	The Adventure of the Egyptian Student	Anon. (R. C. Armour)		
The Sexton Blake Library (2nd Series) 8	The Case of the Ten Diamonds	Anon. (George Hamilton Teed)		
The Sexton Blake Library (2nd Series) 9	The Case of the Man Who Never Slept	Anon. (Gwyn Evans)		
The Sexton Blake Library (2nd Series) 10	The Affair of the Phantom Car	Anon. (E. J. Murray)		
The Sexton Blake Library (2nd Series) 11	The Hunchback of Hatton Garden	Anon. (H. Gregory Hill)		
The Sexton Blake Library (2nd Series) 12	The Case of the Society Blackmailer	Anon. (William Murray Graydon)		
The Sexton Blake Library (2nd Series) 13	The Mystery of the Swanley Viaduct	Anon. (George N. Philips)		
The Sexton Blake Library (2nd Series) 14	The Case of the Bogus Bride!	Anon. (H. H. Clifford Gibbons)		
The Sexton Blake Library (2nd Series) 15	The Crumblerock Crime	Anon. (William J. Bayfield)		
The Sexton Blake Library (2nd Series) 16	The Clue of the Four Wigs	Anon. (George Hamilton Teed)		
The Sexton Blake Library (2nd Series) 17	On the Night Express!	Anon. (H. H. Clifford Gibbons)		
The Sexton Blake Library (2nd Series) 18	The Adventure of the Albanian Avenger	Anon. (W. W. Sayer)		
The Sexton Blake Library (2nd Series) 19	The Great Canal Plot	Anon. (George Hamilton Teed)		
The Sexton Blake Library (2nd Series) 20	The Case of the Two Scapegraces	Anon. (William Murray Graydon)		
The Sexton Blake Library (2nd Series) 21	Under the Eagle's Wing	Anon. (George Hamilton Teed)		
The Sexton Blake Library (2nd Series) 22	The Affair of the Diamond Star	Anon. (H. H. Clifford Gibbons)		
The Sexton Blake Library (2nd Series) 23	Black Cargo	Anon. (William Murray Graydon)		
The Sexton Blake Library (2nd Series) 24	The Case of the Press Photographer	Anon. (William J. Bayfield)		
The Sexton Blake Library (2nd Series) 25	The Case of the Chinese Pearls	Anon. (George Hamilton Teed)		
The Sexton Blake Library (2nd Series) 26	The Barton Manor Mystery	Anon. (Gwyn Evans)		
The Sexton Blake Library (2nd Series) 27	The Priest's Secret	Anon. (William Murray Graydon)		
The Sexton Blake Library (2nd Series) 28	The Legacy of Doom	Anon. (E. J. Murray)		
The Union Jack (2nd Series) 1,108	The Ghost Raisers	Anon. (J. N. Pentelow)		
The Union Jack (2nd Series) 1,109	The Affair of the Tartan Box	Anon. (George Hamilton Teed)		
The Union Jack (2nd Series) 1,110	The Treasure of Tortoise Island	Anon. (George Hamilton Teed)		
The Union Jack (2nd Series) 1,111	The House of the Horoscope	Anon. (H. H. Clifford Gibbons)		
The Union Jack (2nd Series) 1,112	The Adventure of the Blue Bowl	Anon. (George Hamilton Teed)		
The Union Jack (2nd Series) 1,113	The House on the Cliff	Anon. (George Hamilton Teed)		
The Union Jack (2nd Series) 1,114	The Crime of Stanley Trail	Anon. (George Hamilton Teed)		
The Union Jack (2nd Series) 1,115	The Case of the Seventh Key	Anon. (W. W. Sayer)		
The Union Jack (2nd Series) 1,116	Absolute Authority	Anon. (George N. Philips)		
The Union Jack (2nd Series) 1,117	Found – And Lost!	Anon. (Robert Murray Graydon)	The Criminals' Confederation	
The Union Jack (2nd Series) 1,118	The Affair of the Roman Relics	Anon. (Edwy Searles Brooks)		
The Union Jack (2nd Series) 1,119	Reece's Republic	Anon. (Robert Murray Graydon)	The Criminals' Confederation	
The Union Jack (2nd Series) 1,120	The Case of the Living Head	Anon. (George Hamilton Teed)		
The Union Jack (2nd Series) 1,121	The Affair of the Empress' Little Finger	Anon. (George Hamilton Teed)		
The Union Jack (2nd Series) 1,122	The Monte Carlo Mystery	Anon. (George Hamilton Teed)		
The Union Jack (2nd Series) 1,123	Who is the Man?	Anon. (Gwyn Evans)		
The Union Jack (2nd Series) 1,124	The Disguise of Doom	Anon. (N. Wood-Smith)		
The Union Jack (2nd Series) 1,125	Condemned to the Mines	Anon. (Robert Murray Graydon)	The Criminals' Confederation	
The Union Jack (2nd Series) 1,126	The Mystery of the Model	Anon. (R. C. Armour)		
The Union Jack (2nd Series) 1,127	Yellow Vengeance!	Anon. (Robert Murray Graydon)	The Criminals' Confederation	
The Union Jack (2nd Series) 1,128	A Problem of Proof	Anon. (George N. Philips)		
The Union Jack (2nd Series) 1,129	The Man Who Won the 'Calcutta'	Anon. (George Hamilton Teed)		
The Union Jack (2nd Series) 1,130	The Case of the Wandering Jew	Anon. (Gwyn Evans)		
The Union Jack (2nd Series) 1,131	The Pauper of Pengarth Castle	Anon. (Edwy Searles Brooks)		
The Union Jack (2nd Series) 1,132	The Curse of Pengarth Castle	Anon. (Edwy Searles Brooks)		
The Union Jack (2nd Series) 1,133	Into the Unknown	Anon. (Robert Murray Graydon)	The Criminals' Confederation	
The Union Jack (2nd Series) 1,134	The Affair of the Gold Filled Tooth	Anon. (H. H. Clifford Gibbons)		
The Union Jack (2nd Series) 1,135	The Great Stadium Sensation	Anon. (Edwy Searles Brooks)		
The Union Jack (2nd Series) 1,136	The Clue of the Sheffield Sampler	Anon. (H. H. Clifford Gibbons)		
The Union Jack (2nd Series) 1,137	The Yellow City	Anon. (Robert Murray Graydon)	The Criminals' Confederation	
The Union Jack (2nd Series) 1,138	The Lift-Shaft Mystery	Anon. (H. H. Clifford Gibbons)		
The Union Jack (2nd Series) 1,139	The Strange Affair of the Mantel Register Grate	Anon. (George N. Philips)		
The Union Jack (2nd Series) 1,140	The Adventure of the Engineer's Blue-Print	Anon. (H. H. Clifford Gibbons)		
The Union Jack (2nd Series) 1,141	The Kidnapped Correspondent	Anon. (George Hamilton Teed)		
The Union Jack (2nd Series) 1,142	The Negative Alibi	Anon. (H. H. Clifford Gibbons)		
The Union Jack (2nd Series) 1,143	The Great Waxworks Mystery	Anon. (Gwyn Evans)		
The Union Jack (2nd Series) 1,144	Blackmail!	Anon. (H. H. Clifford Gibbons)		
The Union Jack (2nd Series) 1,145	The Affair of the Walnut Desk	Anon. (George Hamilton Teed)		
The Union Jack (2nd Series) 1,146	The Scarecrow Clue	Anon. (F. W. Young)		
The Union Jack (2nd Series) 1,147	The Adventure of the Five Giants	Anon. (George Hamilton Teed)		
The Union Jack (2nd Series) 1,148	The Green Rose	Anon. (George Hamilton Teed)		
The Union Jack (2nd Series) 1,149	Tinker's Secret	Anon. (George Hamilton Teed)		
The Union Jack (2nd Series) 1,150	The Loyalty of Nirvana	Anon. (George Hamilton Teed)		
The Union Jack (2nd Series) 1,151	The Million-Pound Double	Anon. (S. G. Shaw)		
The Union Jack (2nd Series) 1,152	The Strange Affair of the Willow-Pattern Plate	Anon. (H. H. Clifford Gibbons)		
The Union Jack (2nd Series) 1,153	The Sign of the Saracen	Anon. (Gwyn Evans)		
The Union Jack (2nd Series) 1,154	Buried Alive	Anon. (H. H. Clifford Gibbons)	The Criminals' Confederation	
The Union Jack (2nd Series) 1,155	Homeward Bound	Anon. (H. H. Clifford Gibbons)	The Criminals' Confederation	
The Union Jack (2nd Series) 1,156	Vendetta	Anon. (George Hamilton Teed)		
The Union Jack (2nd Series) 1,157	The Mystery of Mrs. Bardell's Xmas Pudding	Anon. (Gwyn Evans)		
The Union Jack (2nd Series) 1,158	Landed at Last!	Anon. (H. H. Clifford Gibbons)	The Criminals' Confederation	
The Union Jack (2nd Series) 1,159	Nirvana's Secret	Anon. (George Hamilton Teed)		

== 1926 ==
Publication	Title	Author	Key Characters	Notes
The Nelson Lee Library 552	The City of Masks (part 16)	Anon. (E. J. Murray)		
The Nelson Lee Library 557	The Calcroft Case (part 1)	Sidney Drew (E. J. Murray)		
The Nelson Lee Library 558	The Calcroft Case (part 2)	Sidney Drew (E. J. Murray)		
The Nelson Lee Library 559	The Calcroft Case (part 3)	Sidney Drew (E. J. Murray)		
The Nelson Lee Library 560	The Calcroft Case (part 4)	Sidney Drew (E. J. Murray)		
The Nelson Lee Library 561	The Calcroft Case (part 5)	Sidney Drew (E. J. Murray)		
The Nelson Lee Library 562	The Calcroft Case (part 6)	Sidney Drew (E. J. Murray)		
The Nelson Lee Library 563	The Calcroft Case (part 7)	Sidney Drew (E. J. Murray)		
The Nelson Lee Library 564	The Calcroft Case (part 8)	Sidney Drew (E. J. Murray)		
The Nelson Lee Library 565	The Calcroft Case (part 9)	Sidney Drew (E. J. Murray)		
The Nelson Lee Library 566	The Calcroft Case (part 10)	Sidney Drew (E. J. Murray)		
The Nelson Lee Library 567	The Calcroft Case (part 11)	Sidney Drew (E. J. Murray)		
The Sexton Blake Library (2nd Series) 29	The Affair of the Cross Roads	Anon. (H. H. Clifford Gibbons)		
The Sexton Blake Library (2nd Series) 30	The Case of the Long-Firm Frauds	Anon. (John W. Bobin)		
The Sexton Blake Library (2nd Series) 31	The Crook's Double	Anon. (William J. Bayfield)		
The Sexton Blake Library (2nd Series) 32	The Treasure of the Manchus	Anon. (R. C. Armour)		
The Sexton Blake Library (2nd Series) 33	The Impersonators	Anon. (Edwy Searles Brooks)		
The Sexton Blake Library (2nd Series) 34	The White Death	Anon. (William Murray Graydon)		
The Sexton Blake Library (2nd Series) 35	The Case of the Mummified Hand	Anon. (George Hamilton Teed)		
The Sexton Blake Library (2nd Series) 36	The Blackmailed Baronet	Anon. (H. Gregory Hill)		
The Sexton Blake Library (2nd Series) 37	The Case of the Old Oak Chest	Anon. (H. H. Clifford Gibbons)		
The Sexton Blake Library (2nd Series) 38	The Adventure of the Red Headed Man	Anon. (William J. Bayfield)		
The Sexton Blake Library (2nd Series) 39	The Clause in the Will	Anon. (William Murray Graydon)		
The Sexton Blake Library (2nd Series) 40	The Black Limousine	Anon. (W. W. Sayer)		
The Sexton Blake Library (2nd Series) 41	The Island of the Guilty	Anon. (George Hamilton Teed)		
The Sexton Blake Library (2nd Series) 42	Behind the Walls	Anon. (William Murray Graydon)		
The Sexton Blake Library (2nd Series) 43	The Riddle of the Lascar's Head	Anon. (Leonard H. Brooks)		
The Sexton Blake Library (2nd Series) 44	The Affair of the Seven Warnings	Anon. (George N. Philips)		
The Sexton Blake Library (2nd Series) 45	The Ethiopian's Secret	Anon. (W. W. Sayer)		
The Sexton Blake Library (2nd Series) 46	The Shipwrecked Detective	Anon. (William Murray Graydon)		
The Sexton Blake Library (2nd Series) 47	Out of the Fog	Anon. (F. A. Symonds)		
The Sexton Blake Library (2nd Series) 48	The City of Masks	Anon. (E. J. Murray)		
The Sexton Blake Library (2nd Series) 49	The Case of the Bookmaker Baronet	Anon. (John W. Bobin)		
The Sexton Blake Library (2nd Series) 50	The South Coast Tragedy	Anon. (H. H. Clifford Gibbons)		
The Sexton Blake Library (2nd Series) 51	The Prisoner of the Mountains	Anon. (William Murray Graydon)		
The Sexton Blake Library (2nd Series) 52	The Black Emperor	Anon. (George Hamilton Teed)		
The Sexton Blake Library (2nd Series) 53	The Council of Crooks	Anon. (William J. Bayfield)		
The Sexton Blake Library (2nd Series) 54	The Black Shirt Mystery	Anon. (William Murray Graydon)		
The Sexton Blake Library (2nd Series) 55	The Tangle of Terror	Anon. (E. J. Murray)		
The Sexton Blake Library (2nd Series) 56	The Mystery of Bullen Point	Anon. (R. C. Armour)		
The Sexton Blake Library (2nd Series) 57	The Case of the Bogus Treasure Hunt	Anon. (William Murray Graydon)		
The Sexton Blake Library (2nd Series) 58	The Mystery of the Seaside Hotel	Anon. (William J. Bayfield)		
The Sexton Blake Library (2nd Series) 59	The Case of the Silent Safe-Cutters	Anon. (H. H. Clifford Gibbons)		
The Sexton Blake Library (2nd Series) 60	The Secret of Torre Island	Anon. (R. C. Armour)		
The Sexton Blake Library (2nd Series) 61	The Mystery of the Championship Belt	Anon. (A. S. Hardy)		
The Sexton Blake Library (2nd Series) 62	The Affair of the Missing Witness	Anon. (William Murray Graydon)		
The Sexton Blake Library (2nd Series) 63	The Case of the Lone Plantation	Anon. (E. J. Murray)		
The Sexton Blake Library (2nd Series) 64	The Adventure of the Silk Smugglers	Anon. (R. C. Armour)		
The Sexton Blake Library (2nd Series) 65	The Excavator's Secret	Anon. (H. H. Clifford Gibbons)		
The Sexton Blake Library (2nd Series) 66	The Yacht of Mystery	Anon. (William Murray Graydon)		
The Sexton Blake Library (2nd Series) 67	The Calcroft Case	Anon. (E. J. Murray)		
The Sexton Blake Library (2nd Series) 68	The Affair of the Trade Rivals	Anon. (R. C. Armour)		
The Sexton Blake Library (2nd Series) 69	The Mystery of Hanging Sword Alley	Anon. (William J. Bayfield)		
The Sexton Blake Library (2nd Series) 70	The Menace of the Silent Death	Anon. (E. J. Murray)		
The Sexton Blake Library (2nd Series) 71	The Bloodhound's Revenge	Anon. (William Murray Graydon)		
The Sexton Blake Library (2nd Series) 72	The Riddle of the Lost Emigrant	Anon. (R. C. Armour)		
The Sexton Blake Library (2nd Series) 73	The Riddle of the Russian Gold	Anon. (George Hamilton Teed)		
The Sexton Blake Library (2nd Series) 74	The Death Duty Swindle	Anon. (William J. Bayfield)		
The Sexton Blake Library (2nd Series) 75	The Case of the Theatrical Profiteer	Anon. (William Murray Graydon)		
The Sexton Blake Library (2nd Series) 76	The Crook of Fleet Street	Anon. (Gwyn Evans)		
The Union Jack (2nd Series) 1,160	The Affair of the Crumpled Paper	Anon. (George N. Philips)		
The Union Jack (2nd Series) 1,161	The Mystery of the Painted Slippers	Anon. (George Hamilton Teed)		
The Union Jack (2nd Series) 1,162	Threads of Fate	Anon. (George N. Philips)		
The Union Jack (2nd Series) 1,163	Gone to Earth	Anon. (H. H. Clifford Gibbons)	The Criminals' Confederation	
The Union Jack (2nd Series) 1,164	Reece's Hold-Up	Anon. (H. H. Clifford Gibbons)	The Criminals' Confederation	
The Union Jack (2nd Series) 1,165	North of 70°	Anon. (H. H. Clifford Gibbons)	The Criminals' Confederation	
The Union Jack (2nd Series) 1,166	The Lumber Looters	Anon. (George Hamilton Teed)		
The Union Jack (2nd Series) 1,167	The Case of the Missing Link	Anon. (Gwyn Evans)		
The Union Jack (2nd Series) 1,168	Nirvana's Ordeal	Anon. (George Hamilton Teed)		
The Union Jack (2nd Series) 1,169	The Case of the Sexton Blake Bust	Anon. (Jack Lewis)		
The Union Jack (2nd Series) 1,170	The Adventure of the Bowery Tar Baby	Anon. (George Hamilton Teed)		
The Union Jack (2nd Series) 1,171	The Plant of Prey	Anon. (George N. Philips)		
The Union Jack (2nd Series) 1,172	The Clue of the Cracked Footprint	Anon. (George Hamilton Teed)		
The Union Jack (2nd Series) 1,173	Guns is Guns	Anon. (Gwyn Evans)		
The Union Jack (2nd Series) 1,174	Zenith Declares War	Anon. (George N. Philips)		
The Union Jack (2nd Series) 1,175	Reece's Revenge	Anon. (H. H. Clifford Gibbons)	The Criminals' Confederation	
The Union Jack (2nd Series) 1,176	Twixt Cup and Law	Anon. (A. S. Hardy)		
The Union Jack (2nd Series) 1,177	The Case of the Stricken Outpost	Anon. (George Hamilton Teed)		
The Union Jack (2nd Series) 1,178	The Mystery of the Masked Rider	Anon. (George N. Philips)		
The Union Jack (2nd Series) 1,179	The House on Hathou	Anon. (Gwyn Evans)		
The Union Jack (2nd Series) 1,180	Pedro Takes Charge	Anon. (Gwyn Evans)		
The Union Jack (2nd Series) 1,181	The Return of Professor Kew	Anon. (H. H. Clifford Gibbons)		
The Union Jack (2nd Series) 1,182	A Mystery in Motley	Anon. (George N. Philips)		
The Union Jack (2nd Series) 1,183	The Riddle of the Huddersfield Face Builder	Anon. (S. G. Shaw)		
The Union Jack (2nd Series) 1,184	The House of a Thousand Teeth	Anon. (R. C. Armour)		
The Union Jack (2nd Series) 1,185	The Marriage of Jason Reece	Anon. (H. H. Clifford Gibbons)	The Criminals' Confederation	
The Union Jack (2nd Series) 1,186	The Case of the Phantom Ferry	Anon. (H. H. Clifford Gibbons)		
The Union Jack (2nd Series) 1,187	The Affair of the Talking Ape	Anon. (A. Paterson)		
The Union Jack (2nd Series) 1,188	The Mystery of the Mechanical Men	Anon. (George N. Philips)		
The Union Jack (2nd Series) 1,189	The Adventure of the Railway Raiders	Anon. (H. H. Clifford Gibbons)		
The Union Jack (2nd Series) 1,190	The Spectre of the Speedway	Anon. (Alfred Edgar)		
The Union Jack (2nd Series) 1,191	Dirk Dolland's Crime	Anon. (H. H. Clifford Gibbons)	The Criminals' Confederation	
The Union Jack (2nd Series) 1,192	The Secret of Shakespeare's Skull	Anon. (Gwyn Evans)		
The Union Jack (2nd Series) 1,193	Ruff Hanson Runs Amok	Anon. (Gwyn Evans)		
The Union Jack (2nd Series) 1,194	The Mystery of the Man from Manila	Anon. (George Hamilton Teed)		
The Union Jack (2nd Series) 1,195	200 Fathoms Down!	Anon. (H. H. Clifford Gibbons)		
The Union Jack (2nd Series) 1,196	The Great Round-Up!	Anon. (Robert Murray Graydon)	The Criminals' Confederation	
The Union Jack (2nd Series) 1,197	The Case of the Kirkton Coal-King	Anon. (A. Paterson)		
The Union Jack (2nd Series) 1,198	The Mystery of Room No. 7	Anon. (George Hamilton Teed)		
The Union Jack (2nd Series) 1,199	The Case of the Sheffield Ironmaster	Anon. (George Hamilton Teed)		
The Union Jack (2nd Series) 1,200	The Affair of the Derelict Grange	Anon. (George Hamilton Teed)		
The Union Jack (2nd Series) 1,201	The Mystery of the Venetian Palace	Anon. (George Hamilton Teed)		
The Union Jack (2nd Series) 1,202	The Clue of the Two Straws	Anon. (George Hamilton Teed)		
The Union Jack (2nd Series) 1,203	A Mystery of the Mountains	Anon. (George Hamilton Teed)		
The Union Jack (2nd Series) 1,204	The Mysterious Affair of the Vanishing Stones	Anon. (Jack Lewis)		
The Union Jack (2nd Series) 1,205	The Problem of the Gardener's Cottage	Anon. (Jack Lewis)		
The Union Jack (2nd Series) 1,206	Lord of the Ape Men	Anon. (Robert Murray Graydon)		
The Union Jack (2nd Series) 1,207	The Mystery of the Masked Magician	Anon. (Robert Murray Graydon)		
The Union Jack (2nd Series) 1,208	The Adventure of the Two Devils	Anon. (George Hamilton Teed)		
The Union Jack (2nd Series) 1,209	From Information Received	Anon. (Robert Murray Graydon)		
The Union Jack (2nd Series) 1,210	Mrs. Bardell's Christmas Eve	Anon. (Gwyn Evans)		

== 1927 ==
Publication	Title	Author	Key Characters	Notes
The Boys' Realm 18	The Riddle of the Rovers (part 1)	C. Malcolm Hincks		
The Boys' Realm 19	The Riddle of the Rovers (part 2)	C. Malcolm Hincks		
The Boys' Realm 20	The Riddle of the Rovers (part 3)	C. Malcolm Hincks		
The Boys' Realm 21	The Riddle of the Rovers (part 4)	C. Malcolm Hincks		
The Boys' Realm 22	The Riddle of the Rovers (part 5)	C. Malcolm Hincks		
The Boys' Realm 23	The Riddle of the Rovers (part 6)	C. Malcolm Hincks		
The Boys' Realm 24	The Riddle of the Rovers (part 7)	C. Malcolm Hincks		
The Popular 434	The Helderstone Pearls	Anon. (Unknown)		
The Popular 435	The Stolen Tie Pin	Anon. (Unknown)		
The Popular 436	The Black Hand	Anon. (Unknown)		
The Popular 437	The Houseboat Mystery	Anon. (Unknown)		
The Popular 438	The Case of the Artificial Rubies	Anon. (Unknown)		
The Popular 439	The Mystery of the Forged Cheque	Anon. (Unknown)		
The Popular 440	The Colonel's Guest	Anon. (Unknown)		
The Popular 441	The Case of the Missing Sapphires	Anon. (Unknown)		
The Popular 442	The Secret of the King's Keep	Anon. (Unknown)		
The Popular 443	Tricked in the Train	Anon. (Unknown)		
The Popular 444	The Mystery of the Theatre Box	Anon. (Unknown)		
The Popular 445	The Affair of the Shooting Party	Anon. (Unknown)		
The Popular 446	What the Office Boy Saw	Anon. (Unknown)		
The Popular 447	The Case of the Goona Pearls	Anon. (Unknown)		
The Popular 448	The Three Sovereigns	Anon. (Unknown)		
The Popular 449	Diamond Cut Diamond	Anon. (Unknown)		
The Popular 450	Proved Innocent	Anon. (Unknown)		
The Sexton Blake Library (2nd Series) 77	The Terror of Tangier	Anon. (George Hamilton Teed)		
The Sexton Blake Library (2nd Series) 78	Who Killed Carson?	Anon. (H. H. Clifford Gibbons)		
The Sexton Blake Library (2nd Series) 79	The Man Who Drove On	Anon. (William Murray Graydon)		
The Sexton Blake Library (2nd Series) 80	Dead Man's Shoes	Anon. (R. C. Armour)		
The Sexton Blake Library (2nd Series) 81	The Affair of the Kidnapped Crook	Anon. (H. H. Clifford Gibbons)		
The Sexton Blake Library (2nd Series) 82	The Night-Club Mystery	Anon. (George Hamilton Teed)		
The Sexton Blake Library (2nd Series) 83	The Case of the Human Ape	Anon. (William Murray Graydon)		
The Sexton Blake Library (2nd Series) 84	The City of Horrors	Anon. (William J. Bayfield)		
The Sexton Blake Library (2nd Series) 85	The Rogues' Republic	Anon. (George Hamilton Teed)		
The Sexton Blake Library (2nd Series) 86	Wanted!	Anon. (William Murray Graydon)		
The Sexton Blake Library (2nd Series) 87	The Riddle of the Golden Fingers	Anon. (E. J. Murray)		
The Sexton Blake Library (2nd Series) 88	The Trail of the Old Lag	Anon. (William J. Bayfield)		
The Sexton Blake Library (2nd Series) 89	The Tiger of Canton	Anon. (George Hamilton Teed)		
The Sexton Blake Library (2nd Series) 90	The Cup Final Mystery	Anon. (Alfred Edgar)		
The Sexton Blake Library (2nd Series) 91	The Case of the Human Mole	Anon. (Houghton Townley)		
The Sexton Blake Library (2nd Series) 92	The Pirates of the Airway	Anon. (R. C. Armour)		
The Sexton Blake Library (2nd Series) 93	The Burglar of White Birches	Anon. (William Murray Graydon)		
The Sexton Blake Library (2nd Series) 94	The Mystery of the Mansion Fire	Anon. (H. H. Clifford Gibbons)		
The Sexton Blake Library (2nd Series) 95	The Three Masked Men	Anon. (J. N. Pentelow)		
The Sexton Blake Library (2nd Series) 96	The Case of the Hold-Up King	Anon. (F. A. Symonds)		
The Sexton Blake Library (2nd Series) 97	The Palace of Terror	Anon. (E. J. Murray)		
The Sexton Blake Library (2nd Series) 98	The Secret of the Tomb	Anon. (William J. Bayfield)		
The Sexton Blake Library (2nd Series) 99	The Movie Mystery	Anon. (R. C. Armour)		
The Sexton Blake Library (2nd Series) 100	The Adventure of the Rogue's Apprentice	Anon. (William Murray Graydon)		
The Sexton Blake Library (2nd Series) 101	The Cleopatra Needle Mystery	Anon. (J. N. Pentelow)		
The Sexton Blake Library (2nd Series) 102	The Riddle of the Amber Room	Anon. (H. Gregory Hill)		
The Sexton Blake Library (2nd Series) 103	The Fatal Pit	Anon. (John W. Bobin)		
The Sexton Blake Library (2nd Series) 104	The Crime in the Wood	Anon. (William Murray Graydon)		
The Sexton Blake Library (2nd Series) 105	The Clue of the Second Tooth	Anon. (Donald Stuart)		
The Sexton Blake Library (2nd Series) 106	Rogues of the Desert	Anon. (William Murray Graydon)		
The Sexton Blake Library (2nd Series) 107	The Mystery of the Four Rooms	Anon. (H. H. Clifford Gibbons)		
The Sexton Blake Library (2nd Series) 108	The Phantom of the Mill	Anon. (Lester Bidston)		
The Sexton Blake Library (2nd Series) 109	The Prisoner of the Buddha	Anon. (R. C. Armour)		
The Sexton Blake Library (2nd Series) 110	The Oath of Fear	Anon. (William J. Bayfield)		
The Sexton Blake Library (2nd Series) 111	The Trail of Death	Anon. (William Murray Graydon)		
The Sexton Blake Library (2nd Series) 112	The Tour of Terror	Anon. (John W. Bobin)		
The Sexton Blake Library (2nd Series) 113	The Case of the Disguised Apache	Anon. (George Hamilton Teed)		
The Sexton Blake Library (2nd Series) 114	The Team of Crooks	Anon. (A. S. Hardy)		
The Sexton Blake Library (2nd Series) 115	The Prisoners of Peru	Anon. (Gwyn Evans)		
The Sexton Blake Library (2nd Series) 116	The Great Trunk Mystery	Anon. (Reginald H. Poole)		
The Sexton Blake Library (2nd Series) 117	The Masked Dictator	Anon. (William Murray Graydon)		
The Sexton Blake Library (2nd Series) 118	All Suspected	Anon. (William J. Bayfield)		
The Sexton Blake Library (2nd Series) 119	The Mystery of the Film City	Anon. (George Hamilton Teed)		
The Sexton Blake Library (2nd Series) 120	The Great Salvage Swindle	Anon. (H. H. Clifford Gibbons)		
The Sexton Blake Library (2nd Series) 121	The Case of the Poisoned Pen	Anon. (Gwyn Evans)		
The Sexton Blake Library (2nd Series) 122	The Crook of Chinatown	Anon. (William Murray Graydon)		
The Sexton Blake Library (2nd Series) 123	The Giant City Swindle	Anon. (George N. Philips)		
The Sexton Blake Library (2nd Series) 124	The Secret of the Snows	Anon. (H. H. Clifford Gibbons)		
The Union Jack (2nd Series) 1,211	The Quest of the Limping Man	Anon. (Robert Murray Graydon)	Dr. Satira	
The Union Jack (2nd Series) 1,212	The Case of the Wrestling Rajah	Anon. (Ladbroke Black)	The Spider	
The Union Jack (2nd Series) 1,213	The Spider's Revenge	Anon. (Ladbroke Black)	The Spider	
The Union Jack (2nd Series) 1,214	The Riddle of the Green Diamond	Anon. (Ladbroke Black)	The Spider	
The Union Jack (2nd Series) 1,215	The Spider's Lair	Anon. (Ladbroke Black)	The Spider	
The Union Jack (2nd Series) 1,216	The Affair of the Were-Wolf	Anon. (George N. Philips)	Zenith the Albino	
The Union Jack (2nd Series) 1,217	The Lair of the Limping Man	Anon. (Robert Murray Graydon)	Dr. Satira	
The Union Jack (2nd Series) 1,218	The Mystery of Black Dan's Treasure	Anon. (Edwy Searles Brooks)		
The Union Jack (2nd Series) 1,219	Waldo's Wonder-Stunt!	Anon. (Edwy Searles Brooks)	Waldo	
The Union Jack (2nd Series) 1,220	The Affair of the Professional Avenger	Anon. (Edwy Searles Brooks)	Waldo	
Plus:				
The Striking Shadow (part 1)	Anon. (Unknown)			
The Union Jack (2nd Series) 1,221	The Case of the Second Blackmailer!	Anon. (Edwy Searles Brooks)	Waldo	
Plus:				
The Striking Shadow (part 2)	Anon. (Unknown)			
The Union Jack (2nd Series) 1,222	The Lightning-Flash Mystery!	Anon. (Edwy Searles Brooks)	Waldo	
Plus:				
The Striking Shadow (part 3)	Anon. (Unknown)			
The Union Jack (2nd Series) 1,223	The Puzzle of the Blue Ensign	Anon. (Tom Stenner)		
Plus:				
The Striking Shadow (part 4)	Anon. (Unknown)			
The Union Jack (2nd Series) 1,224	The Adventure of the Yellow Beetle	Anon. (George Hamilton Teed)	Wu ling	
Plus:				
The Striking Shadow (part 5)	Anon. (Unknown)			
The Union Jack (2nd Series) 1,225	The Temple of Many Visions	Anon. (George Hamilton Teed)	Wu ling	
Plus:				
The Striking Shadow (part 6)	Anon. (Unknown)			
The Union Jack (2nd Series) 1,226	Doomed to the Dragon	Anon. (George Hamilton Teed)	Wu ling	
Plus:				
The Striking Shadow (part 7)	Anon. (Unknown)			
The Union Jack (2nd Series) 1,227	The House of the Wooden Lanterns	Anon. (George Hamilton Teed)	Wu ling	
Plus:				
The Striking Shadow (part 8)	Anon. (Unknown)			
The Union Jack (2nd Series) 1,228	The Coming of the Black Trinity	Anon. (George N. Philips)	Black Trinity	
Plus:				
The Striking Shadow (part 9)	Anon. (Unknown)			
The Union Jack (2nd Series) 1,229	The Trail of the Nameless Three	Anon. (George N. Philips)	Black Trinity	
Plus:				
The Striking Shadow (part 10)	Anon. (Unknown)			
The Union Jack (2nd Series) 1,230	Sexton Blake, Suspect	Anon. (George N. Philips)	Black Trinity	
Plus:				
The Striking Shadow (part 11)	Anon. (Unknown)			
The Union Jack (2nd Series) 1,231	The Case of the Phantom Head	Anon. (George N. Philips)	Black Trinity	
Plus:				
The Striking Shadow (part 12)	Anon. (Unknown)			
Plus:				
The Fox of Pennyfields (part 1)	Anon. (Unknown)	Leon Kestrel		
The Union Jack (2nd Series) 1,232	The Case of the Disqualified Derby	Anon. (Tom Stenner)		
Plus:				
The Fox of Pennyfields (part 2)	Anon. (Unknown)	Leon Kestrel		
The Union Jack (2nd Series) 1,233	The Problem of the Double Four	Anon. (Gwyn Evans)	King Karl	
Plus:				
The Fox of Pennyfields (part 3)	Anon. (Unknown)			
The Union Jack (2nd Series) 1,234	Duped by the Double Four	Anon. (Gwyn Evans)	King Karl	
Plus:				
The Fox of Pennyfields (part 4)	Anon. (Unknown)	Leon Kestrel		
The Union Jack (2nd Series) 1,235	The Gallows Mystery	Anon. (Gwyn Evans)	King Karl	
Plus:				
The Fox of Pennyfields (part 5)	Anon. (Unknown)	Leon Kestrel		
The Union Jack (2nd Series) 1,236	The Return of Sexton Blake	Anon. (Gwyn Evans)	King Karl	
Plus:				
The Black Abbot of Cheng-Tu (part 1)	Anon. (George Hamilton Teed)			
The Union Jack (2nd Series) 1,237	Eclipse!	Anon. (Gwyn Evans)		
Plus:				
The Black Abbot of Cheng-Tu (part 2)	Anon. (George Hamilton Teed)			
The Union Jack (2nd Series) 1,238	The Mystery of the Ivory Beam	Anon. (Gwyn Evans)	King Karl	
Plus:				
The Black Abbot of Cheng-Tu (part 3)	Anon. (George Hamilton Teed)			
The Union Jack (2nd Series) 1,239	The Adventure of the Vanishing Shop	Anon. (Gwyn Evans)	king Karl	
Plus:				
The Black Abbot of Cheng-Tu (part 4)	Anon. (George Hamilton Teed)			
The Union Jack (2nd Series) 1,240	The Case of the Friend of May Cubitt	Anon. (George N. Philips)		
Plus:				
The Black Abbot of Cheng-Tu (part 5)	Anon. (George Hamilton Teed)			
The Union Jack (2nd Series) 1,241	The Great Yachting Week Mystery	Anon. (C. Malcolm Hincks)		
Plus:				
The Black Abbot of Cheng-Tu (part 6)	Anon. (George Hamilton Teed)			
The Union Jack (2nd Series) 1,242	The Mystery of the Dyed Rats	Anon. (R. C. Armour)		
Plus:				
The Black Abbot of Cheng-Tu (part 7)	Anon. (George Hamilton Teed)			
The Union Jack (2nd Series) 1,243	The Vengeance of the Marsh	Anon. (R. L. Hadfield)		
Plus:				
The Black Abbot of Cheng-Tu (part 8)	Anon. (George Hamilton Teed)			
The Union Jack (2nd Series) 1,244	The Terror of Goringhurst	Anon. (A. Paterson)		
Plus:				
The Black Abbot of Cheng-Tu (part 9)	Anon. (George Hamilton Teed)			
The Union Jack (2nd Series) 1,245	The Haunted Hotel Mystery	Anon. (George N. Philips)		
Plus:				
The Black Abbot of Cheng-Tu (part 10)	Anon. (George Hamilton Teed)			
The Union Jack (2nd Series) 1,246	The Adventure of the Dummy's Double	Anon. (Robert Murray Graydon)	Dr. Satira	
Plus:				
The Black Abbot of Cheng-Tu (part 11)	Anon. (George Hamilton Teed)			
The Union Jack (2nd Series) 1,247	The Case of the Oil Pirates	Anon. (Stacey Blake)		
Plus:				
The Black Abbot of Cheng-Tu (part 12)	Anon. (George Hamilton Teed)			
The Union Jack (2nd Series) 1,248	Justice Defied	Anon. (Robert Murray Graydon)	Dr. Satira	
Plus:				
The Black Abbot of Cheng-Tu (part 13)	Anon. (George Hamilton Teed)			
The Union Jack (2nd Series) 1,249	The Mystery Man of Marl House	Anon. (Robert Murray Graydon)		
Plus:				
The Black Abbot of Cheng-Tu (part 14)	Anon. (George Hamilton Teed)			
The Union Jack (2nd Series) 1,250	Sexton Blake – Convict	Anon. (Robert Murray Graydon)		
Plus:				
The Black Abbot of Cheng-Tu (part 15)	Anon. (George Hamilton Teed)			
The Union Jack (2nd Series) 1,251	The Trail of the Bandaged Man	Anon. (Robert Murray Graydon)	Dr. Satira	
Plus:				
The Black Abbot of Cheng-Tu (part 16)	Anon. (George Hamilton Teed)			
The Union Jack (2nd Series) 1,252	The Mystery of the Master Crook's Messenger	Anon. (H. H. Clifford Gibbons)		
Plus:				
The Black Abbot of Cheng-Tu (part 17)	Anon. (George Hamilton Teed)			
The Union Jack (2nd Series) 1,253	The Norman Duke Mystery	Anon. (N. Wood-Smith)		
Plus:				
The Black Abbot of Cheng-Tu (part 18)	Anon. (George Hamilton Teed)			
The Union Jack (2nd Series) 1,254	The Case of Colton's Mule	Anon. (George Hamilton Teed)	George Marsden Plummer	
Plus:				
The Black Abbot of Cheng-Tu (part 19)	Anon. (George Hamilton Teed)			
The Union Jack (2nd Series) 1,255	The Affair of the Rotten Rails	Anon. (George Hamilton Teed)	George Marsden Plummer	
The Union Jack (2nd Series) 1,256	The Clue of the Second Goblet	Anon. (George Hamilton Teed)	George Marsden Plummer	
The Union Jack (2nd Series) 1,257	The Mystery of the Haunted Trail	Anon. (S. G. Shaw)		
The Union Jack (2nd Series) 1,258	The Alaska Sweepstake Swindle	Anon. (S. G. Shaw)		
The Union Jack (2nd Series) 1,259	The Adventure of the Phantom Sealer	Anon. (S. G. Shaw)		
The Union Jack (2nd Series) 1,260	The Affair of the Black Carol	Anon. (Gwyn Evans)	Splash Page	
The Union Jack (2nd Series) 1,261	Captive Cargo	Anon. (S. G. Shaw)		
The Union Jack (2nd Series) 1,262	The Adventure of the Green Imps	Anon. (George Hamilton Teed)	George Marsden Plummer	
The Union Jack (2nd Series) 1,263	The Terror of the Pit	Anon. (George Hamilton Teed)		

== 1928 ==
Publication	Title	Author	Key Characters	Notes
The Boys' Realm 25	The Riddle of the Rovers (part 8)	C. Malcolm Hincks		
The Boys' Realm 26	The Riddle of the Rovers (part 9)	C. Malcolm Hincks		
The Boys' Realm 27	The Riddle of the Rovers (part 10)	C. Malcolm Hincks		
The Boys' Realm 28	The Riddle of the Rovers (part 11)	C. Malcolm Hincks		
The Boys' Realm 29	The Riddle of the Rovers (part 12)	C. Malcolm Hincks		
The Sexton Blake Library (2nd Series) 125	The Box of Doom	Anon. (Donald Stuart)		
The Sexton Blake Library (2nd Series) 126	The Secret of the Two Blackmailed Men	Anon. (William Murray Graydon)		
The Sexton Blake Library (2nd Series) 127	The Mystery of the Isle of Fortune	Anon. (R. C. Armour)		
The Sexton Blake Library (2nd Series) 128	The Case of the Portuguese Giantess	Anon. (George Hamilton Teed)		
The Sexton Blake Library (2nd Series) 129	The Adventure of the Bogus Sheik	Anon. (George Hamilton Teed)		
The Sexton Blake Library (2nd Series) 130	The Mystery of Monte Carlo	Anon. (William Murray Graydon)		
The Sexton Blake Library (2nd Series) 131	The Riddle of the West End Hairdresser	Anon. (H. H. Clifford Gibbons)		
The Sexton Blake Library (2nd Series) 132	The Secret of the Monastery	Anon. (S. G. Shaw)		
The Sexton Blake Library (2nd Series) 133	The Case of the Mystery Champion	Anon. (A. S. Hardy)		
The Sexton Blake Library (2nd Series) 134	The Victim of Black Magic	Anon. (George Hamilton Teed)		
The Sexton Blake Library (2nd Series) 135	The Doctor Who Wouldn't Tell	Anon. (William Murray Graydon)		
The Sexton Blake Library (2nd Series) 136	The Adventure of the Man 'On Bail'	Anon. (William J. Bayfield)		
The Sexton Blake Library (2nd Series) 137	The Man from Australia	Anon. (F. A. Symonds)		
The Sexton Blake Library (2nd Series) 138	The Trail of the Poison Gang	Anon. (Lester Bidston)		
The Sexton Blake Library (2nd Series) 139	The Mystery of the Golden Chalice	Anon. (William Murray Graydon)		
The Sexton Blake Library (2nd Series) 140	The Riddle of the Run-Away Car	Anon. (H. H. Clifford Gibbons)		
The Sexton Blake Library (2nd Series) 141	The Mystery of Mitcham Common	Anon. (Gwyn Evans)		
Plus:				
The Figure in Black	Anon. (Cecil Hayter)			
The Sexton Blake Library (2nd Series) 142	The Adventure of Speed Mad Camden	Anon. (E. J. Murray)		
Plus:				
The Hidden Securities	Anon. (Unknown)			
The Sexton Blake Library (2nd Series) 143	The Riddle of the Phantom Plague	Anon. (Donald Stuart)		
The Sexton Blake Library (2nd Series) 144	The Case of the Bogus Monk	Anon. (George Hamilton Teed)		
The Sexton Blake Library (2nd Series) 145	The Case of the Rejuvenated Millionaire	Anon. (George N. Philips)		
The Sexton Blake Library (2nd Series) 146	The Monomark Mystery	Anon. (Lewis Carlton)		
The Sexton Blake Library (2nd Series) 147	The Rubber Smugglers	Anon. (George Hamilton Teed)		
The Sexton Blake Library (2nd Series) 148	The Ridde of Crocodile Creek	Anon. (William Murray Graydon)		
The Sexton Blake Library (2nd Series) 149	King of the Underworld	Anon. (Gwyn Evans)		
The Sexton Blake Library (2nd Series) 150	The Secret of the Russian Refugees	Anon. (William Murray Graydon)		
The Sexton Blake Library (2nd Series) 151	The Fur Raiders	Anon. (H. H. Clifford Gibbons)		
The Sexton Blake Library (2nd Series) 152	The Mystery of Sherwood Towers	Anon. (Donald Stuart)		
The Sexton Blake Library (2nd Series) 153	The Adventure of the Voodoo Queen	Anon. (George Hamilton Teed)		
The Sexton Blake Library (2nd Series) 154	The Rogue of Afghanistan	Anon. (William Murray Graydon)		
The Sexton Blake Library (2nd Series) 155	The Case of the Shot P.C.	Anon. (George N. Philips)		
The Sexton Blake Library (2nd Series) 156	The Affair of the Crook Explorer	Anon. (R. C. Armour)		
The Sexton Blake Library (2nd Series) 157	The Mystery of the Phantom Blackmailer	Anon. (Donald Stuart)		
The Sexton Blake Library (2nd Series) 158	The Terror of Gold-Digger Creek	Anon. (George Hamilton Teed)		
The Sexton Blake Library (2nd Series) 159	The Riddle of the Million Pound Bet	Anon. (William J. Bayfield)		
The Sexton Blake Library (2nd Series) 160	The Case of the Fatal Taxicab	Anon. (William Murray Graydon)		
The Sexton Blake Library (2nd Series) 161	Crooks in Clover	Anon. (George Hamilton Teed)		
The Sexton Blake Library (2nd Series) 162	The Mystery of the Mandarin's Idol	Anon. (Robert Murray Graydon)		
The Sexton Blake Library (2nd Series) 163	The 'Flying-Squad' Tragedy	Anon. (William J. Bayfield)		
The Sexton Blake Library (2nd Series) 164	The Case of the Jack of Clubs	Anon. (Gwyn Evans)		
The Sexton Blake Library (2nd Series) 165	The Eighth Millionaire	Anon. (George Hamilton Teed)		
The Sexton Blake Library (2nd Series) 166	The Mystery of the Masked Surgeon	Anon. (R. C. Armour)		
The Sexton Blake Library (2nd Series) 167	The Secret of the Green Lagoon	Anon. (E.J Murray)		
The Sexton Blake Library (2nd Series) 168	The Affair of the Rival Cinema Kings	Anon. (Walter Shute)		
The Sexton Blake Library (2nd Series) 169	The Deserter of the Foreign Legion	Anon. (William Murray Graydon)		
The Sexton Blake Library (2nd Series) 170	The Trail of Doom	Anon. (R. C. Armour)		
The Sexton Blake Library (2nd Series) 171	The Case of the Crimson Conjuror	Anon. (Gwyn Evans)		
The Sexton Blake Library (2nd Series) 172	The Riddle of the Garage	Anon. (H. H. Clifford Gibbons)		
The Union Jack (2nd Series) 1,264	The Treasure of the 'Isabella'	Anon. (George Hamilton Teed)		
The Union Jack (2nd Series) 1,265	The Black Cloud	Anon. (Rex Hardinge)		
The Union Jack (2nd Series) 1,266	The Affair of the Bronze Mirror	Anon. (Edwy Searles Brooks)		
The Union Jack (2nd Series) 1,267	The Diamonds of Devil Pool	Anon. (Edwy Searles Brooks)		
The Union Jack (2nd Series) 1,268	Jungle Justice	Anon. (Edwy Searles Brooks)		
The Union Jack (2nd Series) 1,269	The Mystery of Manor Green	Anon. (Jack Lewis)		
The Union Jack (2nd Series) 1,270	The Girl of Destiny	Anon. (Jack Lewis)		
The Union Jack (2nd Series) 1,271	The Captive of the Catacombs	Anon. (Jack Lewis)		
The Union Jack (2nd Series) 1,272	The Coffee Stall Mystery	Anon. (Gwyn Evans)		
The Union Jack (2nd Series) 1,273	Rogues Afloat	Anon. (Stacey Blake)		
The Union Jack (2nd Series) 1,274	The Case of the 'Kaffir King'	Anon. (Stacey Blake)		
The Union Jack (2nd Series) 1,275	The Mississippi Mystery	Anon. (H. H. Clifford Gibbons)		
The Union Jack (2nd Series) 1,276	The Case of the Grey Envelope	Anon. (George N. Philips)		
The Union Jack (2nd Series) 1,277	The Man Who Walked By Night	Anon. (Gwyn Evans)		
The Union Jack (2nd Series) 1,278	The Phantom of Scotland Yard	Anon. (Gwyn Evans)		
The Union Jack (2nd Series) 1,279	The Adventure of the Gold Bars	Anon. (Ladbroke Black)		
The Union Jack (2nd Series) 1,280	The Great Budget Conspiracy	Anon. (Gwyn Evans)		
The Union Jack (2nd Series) 1,281	The Mystery of the Missing Mace	Anon. (Gwyn Evans)		
The Union Jack (2nd Series) 1,282	The Affair of the Staggering Man	Anon. (Ladbroke Black)		
The Union Jack (2nd Series) 1,283	Fraud	Anon. (Gwyn Evans)		
The Union Jack (2nd Series) 1,284	Sunk Without Trace	Anon. (Ladbroke Black)		
The Union Jack (2nd Series) 1,285	The Victim of the Veldt	Anon. (Rex Hardinge)		
The Union Jack (2nd Series) 1,286	The Skeleton Clue	Anon. (Ladbroke Black)		
The Union Jack (2nd Series) 1,287	The Carnation Wreath Mystery	Anon. (C. Malcolm Hincks)		
The Union Jack (2nd Series) 1,288	The Hunchback of Brotherhood Hall	Anon. (A. Paterson)		
The Union Jack (2nd Series) 1,289	The Seven Sons of Cynos	Anon. (Robert Murray Graydon)		
The Union Jack (2nd Series) 1,290	Hands Up London	Anon. (R. C. Armour)		
The Union Jack (2nd Series) 1,291	The Legion of the Lost	Anon. (George Hamilton Teed)		
The Union Jack (2nd Series) 1,292	The Man With the Burnt Arm	Anon. (H. H. Clifford Gibbons)		
The Union Jack (2nd Series) 1,293	Poison!	Anon. (Gwyn Evans)		
The Union Jack (2nd Series) 1,294	The Problem of the Purple Pierrots	Anon. (C. Malcolm Hincks)		
The Union Jack (2nd Series) 1,295	The Bandit of the Bank	Anon. (A. Paterson)		
The Union Jack (2nd Series) 1,296	The Carrier Pigeon Conspiracy	Anon. (H. H. Clifford Gibbons)		
The Union Jack (2nd Series) 1,297	A Million in Gold	Anon. (Robert Murray Graydon)		
The Union Jack (2nd Series) 1,298	The Law of the Gun	Anon. (A. Paterson)		
The Union Jack (2nd Series) 1,299	The Affair of the Great Seal	Anon. (George N. Philips)		
The Union Jack (2nd Series) 1,300	The Strange Affair of the Rejuvenation Club	Anon. (Ladbroke Black)		
The Union Jack (2nd Series) 1,301	Who was the Man on the Stairs?	Anon. (Gwyn Evans)		
The Union Jack (2nd Series) 1,302	The Adventure of the Apache Chief	Anon. (A. Paterson)		
The Union Jack (2nd Series) 1,303	Double Identity	Anon. (A. Paterson)		
The Union Jack (2nd Series) 1,304	The Scourge of No Man's Land	Anon. (A. Paterson)		
The Union Jack (2nd Series) 1,305	Poisoned Blossoms	Anon. (George Hamilton Teed)		
The Union Jack (2nd Series) 1,306	The House of Fear	Anon. (George Hamilton Teed)		
The Union Jack (2nd Series) 1,307	The Adventure of the Gargoyle's Decoy	Anon. (George N. Philips)		
The Union Jack (2nd Series) 1,308	Sexton Blake, Lord Mayor	Anon. (R. C. Armour)		
The Union Jack (2nd Series) 1,309	The Affair of the Six Ikons	Anon. (George Hamilton Teed)		
The Union Jack (2nd Series) 1,310	The Problem of the Broken Stick	Anon. (George N. Philips)		
The Union Jack (2nd Series) 1,311	The Case of the Scented Orchid	Anon. (George Hamilton Teed)		
The Union Jack (2nd Series) 1,312	The Mystery of the Black Van	Anon. (Robert Murray Graydon)		
The Union Jack (2nd Series) 1,313	The Crime of the Christmas Tree	Anon. (Gwyn Evans)		
The Union Jack (2nd Series) 1,314	The Mystery of the Siping Vampire	Anon. (John W. Bobin)		
The Union Jack (2nd Series) 1,315	The Case of the Captive Emperor	Anon. (George Hamilton Teed)		

== 1929 ==
Publication	Title	Author	Key Characters	Notes
The Boys' Friend Library 181	The Riddle of the Rovers	Anon. (C. Malcolm Hincks)		
The Sexton Blake Library (2nd Series) 173	The Case of the Crook M.P.	Anon. (George N. Philips)		
The Sexton Blake Library (2nd Series) 174	Down and Out	Anon. (William J. Bayfield)		
The Sexton Blake Library (2nd Series) 175	The Mystery of the Man from Rio	Anon. (George Hamilton Teed)		
The Sexton Blake Library (2nd Series) 176	The Affair of the Atlantic Mail Robbery	Anon. (R. C. Armour)		
The Sexton Blake Library (2nd Series) 177	The Secret of the Cask	Anon. (R. C. Armour)		
The Sexton Blake Library (2nd Series) 178	The Gunmen	Anon. (George Hamilton Teed)		
Plus:				
The Agony Column Mystery		Anon. (Unknown)		
The Sexton Blake Library (2nd Series) 179	The 'Black Maria' Mystery	Anon. (William J. Bayfield)		
The Sexton Blake Library (2nd Series) 180	The Vanishing Death	Anon. (William Murray Graydon)		
The Sexton Blake Library (2nd Series) 181	The Sixth Victim	Anon. (William Murray Graydon)		
The Sexton Blake Library (2nd Series) 182	The Man Who Came Back	Anon. (William Murray Graydon)		
The Sexton Blake Library (2nd Series) 183	The Secret of the President's Daughter	Anon. (George Hamilton Teed)		
The Sexton Blake Library (2nd Series) 184	The Mystery of the Uninvited Guest	Anon. (Walter Shute)		
The Sexton Blake Library (2nd Series) 185	The Trail of the Traitor	Anon. (Alfred Edgar)		
The Sexton Blake Library (2nd Series) 186	The Secret of the Vampire Actress	Anon. (William Murray Graydon)		
The Sexton Blake Library (2nd Series) 187	The Covent Garden Mystery	Anon. (William J. Bayfield)		
The Sexton Blake Library (2nd Series) 188	The Man Who Squealed	Anon. (George N. Philips)		
The Sexton Blake Library (2nd Series) 189	The Secret of the 'White' Thug	Anon. (Rev. Reginald F. Foster)		
The Sexton Blake Library (2nd Series) 190	The Ballot Box Mystery	Anon. (H. H. Clifford Gibbons)		
The Sexton Blake Library (2nd Series) 191	The Great 'Tote' Fraud	Anon. (John W. Bobin)		
The Sexton Blake Library (2nd Series) 192	The Mystery of Merlyn Mansions	Anon. (Walter Shute)		
The Sexton Blake Library (2nd Series) 193	The Death of Duboyne	Anon. (William J. Bayfield)		
The Sexton Blake Library (2nd Series) 194	The Bogus Tourist Agency	Anon. (William Murray Graydon)		
The Sexton Blake Library (2nd Series) 195	The Silent Slayer	Anon. (Donald Stuart)		
The Sexton Blake Library (2nd Series) 196	The Fatal Number	Anon. (Walter Shute)		
The Sexton Blake Library (2nd Series) 197	The Riddle of Dead Man's Pit	Anon. (R. C. Armour)		
The Sexton Blake Library (2nd Series) 198	The Fatal Manuscript	Anon. (Donald Stuart)		
The Sexton Blake Library (2nd Series) 199	The Mint Mystery	Anon. (William J. Bayfield)		
The Sexton Blake Library (2nd Series) 200	The Victim of the Waterway	Anon. (George N. Philips)		
The Sexton Blake Library (2nd Series) 201	The Blackpool Mystery	Anon. (Lester Bidston)		
The Sexton Blake Library (2nd Series) 202	Prisoners of the Desert	Anon. (Stacey Blake)		
The Sexton Blake Library (2nd Series) 203	The Riddle of the Great Art Exhibition	Anon. (R. C. Armour)		
The Sexton Blake Library (2nd Series) 204	The Cabaret Crime	Anon. (George Hamilton Teed)		
The Sexton Blake Library (2nd Series) 205	The Secret of the Flames	Anon. (William Murray Graydon)		
The Sexton Blake Library (2nd Series) 206	The Radium Profiteer	Anon. (George N. Philips)		
The Sexton Blake Library (2nd Series) 207	The Pearls of Doom	Anon. (George Hamilton Teed)		
The Sexton Blake Library (2nd Series) 208	The Case of the Discharged P.C.	Anon. (Walter Shute)		
The Sexton Blake Library (2nd Series) 209	The Motor Show Mystery	Anon. (H. H. Clifford Gibbons)		
The Sexton Blake Library (2nd Series) 210	The Secret of the Surgery	Anon. (John W. Bobin)		
The Sexton Blake Library (2nd Series) 211	Dead Man's Sands	Anon. (W. E. Stanton Hope)		
The Sexton Blake Library (2nd Series) 212	The Case of the Murdered Mahout	Anon. (William Murray Graydon)		
The Sexton Blake Library (2nd Series) 213	The Prisoner of the Chateau	Anon. (George Hamilton Teed)		
The Sexton Blake Library (2nd Series) 214	Crooks Ltd.	Anon. (Lester Bidston)		
The Sexton Blake Library (2nd Series) 215	The Masked Forgers	Anon. (William J. Bayfield)		
The Sexton Blake Library (2nd Series) 216	The Mystery of the Docks	Anon. (William Murray Graydon)		
The Sexton Blake Library (2nd Series) 217	The Black Skull	Anon. (Donald Stuart)		
The Sexton Blake Library (2nd Series) 218	The Midnight Mystery	Anon. (Rex Hardinge)		
The Sexton Blake Library (2nd Series) 219	The Bootlegger's Victim	Anon. (R. C. Armour)		
The Sexton Blake Library (2nd Series) 220	The Flaming Belt	Anon. (H. H. Clifford Gibbons)		
The Union Jack (2nd Series) 1,316	The Gold Gang of Bear's Creek	Anon. (Arthur Paterson)		
The Union Jack (2nd Series) 1,317	The Croucher's Come-Back	Anon. (George N. Philips)		
The Union Jack (2nd Series) 1,318	Presumed Dead	Anon. (George Hamilton Teed)		
The Union Jack (2nd Series) 1,319	The Case of the Ghost Ship	Anon. (H. H. Clifford Gibbons)		
The Union Jack (2nd Series) 1,320	The Case of the Shrivelled Man	Anon. (Edwy Searles Brooks)		
The Union Jack (2nd Series) 1,321	The Broken Melody	Anon. (George N. Philips)		
The Union Jack (2nd Series) 1,322	The Captive of the Crag	Anon. (Edwy Searles Brooks)		
The Union Jack (2nd Series) 1,323	The Book of Death	Anon. (Gwyn Evans)		
The Union Jack (2nd Series) 1,324	The Case of the Hairless Man	Anon. (Gwyn Evans)		
The Union Jack (2nd Series) 1,325	The Humber Woodyard Mystery	Anon. (George N. Philips)		
The Union Jack (2nd Series) 1,326	Dead Man's Plunder	Anon. (Robert Murray Graydon)		
The Union Jack (2nd Series) 1,327	Are You Paul Cynos?	Anon. (Robert Murray Graydon)		
The Union Jack (2nd Series) 1,328	The Foot of Fortune	Anon. (H. H. Clifford Gibbons)		
The Union Jack (2nd Series) 1,329	The Flaming Trail	Anon. (Arthur Paterson)		
The Union Jack (2nd Series) 1,330	The Green Flash	Anon. (F. W. Young)		
The Union Jack (2nd Series) 1,331	'Graved in Silver	Anon. (George N. Philips)		
The Union Jack (2nd Series) 1,332	The Mystery of the Four Buffalo Bills	Anon. (R. C. Armour)		
The Union Jack (2nd Series) 1,333	The Case of the Bradford Dragon	Anon. (Gwyn Evans)		
The Union Jack (2nd Series) 1,334	The Mosaic Mystery	Anon. (H. H. Clifford Gibbons)		
The Union Jack (2nd Series) 1,335	The Case of the Devil's Step	Anon. (Robert L. Hadfield)		
The Union Jack (2nd Series) 1,336	One Hundred Years After	Anon. (R. C. Armour)		
The Union Jack (2nd Series) 1,337	Exposure!	Anon. (Gwyn Evans)		
The Union Jack (2nd Series) 1,338	I Defy!	Anon. (Robert Murray Graydon)		
The Union Jack (2nd Series) 1,339	The Case of the Fifth Man	Anon. (George N. Philips)		
The Union Jack (2nd Series) 1,340	The Riddle of Ruralong Bay	Anon. (H. H. Clifford Gibbons)		
The Union Jack (2nd Series) 1,341	The Phantom of the Footplate	Anon. (Gwyn Evans)		
The Union Jack (2nd Series) 1,342	Cracking Walls	Anon. (John W. Bobin)		
The Union Jack (2nd Series) 1,343	Some Persons Unknown	Anon. (Robert L. Hadfield)		
The Union Jack (2nd Series) 1,344	The Man in the Darkened Room	Anon. (Rex Hardinge)		
The Union Jack (2nd Series) 1,345	The Great Pyramid Swindle	Anon. (Gwyn Evans)		
The Union Jack (2nd Series) 1,346	The Shadow Man	Anon. (C. Malcolm Hincks)		
The Union Jack (2nd Series) 1,347	The Jamboree Mystery	Anon. (S. G. Shaw)		
The Union Jack (2nd Series) 1,348	The Adventure of the White Salute	Anon. (George N. Philips)		
The Union Jack (2nd Series) 1,349	The Adventure of the Two Witnesses	Anon. (George N. Philips)		
The Union Jack (2nd Series) 1,350	King's Evidence	Anon. (Robert Murray Graydon)		
The Union Jack (2nd Series) 1,351	The Hand of Hungermere	Anon. (Wilfred Tremelin)		
The Union Jack (2nd Series) 1,352	The Gas Ring Mystery	Anon. (R. C. Armour)		
The Union Jack (2nd Series) 1,353	The White Hearse Mystery	Anon. (Rex Hardinge)		
The Union Jack (2nd Series) 1,354	The Case of the Three Black Cats	Anon. (Edwy Searles Brooks)		
The Union Jack (2nd Series) 1,355	The Mermaid Mystery	Anon. (Stacey Blake)		
The Union Jack (2nd Series) 1,356	Rogues of the Road	Anon. (George N. Philips)		
The Union Jack (2nd Series) 1,357	Terror by Night!	Anon. (Edwy Searles Brooks)		
The Union Jack (2nd Series) 1,358	The Death Snare	Anon. (Edwy Searles Brooks)		
The Union Jack (2nd Series) 1,359	Retribution	Anon. (Robert Murray Graydon)		
The Union Jack (2nd Series) 1,360	The Men Who Were Dead	Gwyn Evans		
The Union Jack (2nd Series) 1,361	The House of Eyes	Gwyn Evans		
The Union Jack (2nd Series) 1,362	The Gnomid	Gilbert Chester (H. H. C. Gibbons)		
The Union Jack (2nd Series) 1,363	The Mail-Bag Mystery	Victor Fremlin (George N. Philips)		
The Union Jack (2nd Series) 1,364	The Frozen Man Mystery	Edwy Searles Brooks		
The Union Jack (2nd Series) 1,365	The Mistletoe-Milk Mystery	George Rees (attr. Gwyn Evans)		
The Union Jack (2nd Series) 1,366	The Masque of Time	Gwyn Evans		
The Union Jack (2nd Series) 1,367	The Judgment Men	Reid Whitly (R. C. Armour)		

== 1930 ==
Publication	Title	Author	Key Characters	Notes
The Sexton Blake Library (2nd Series) 221	The Silent Jury	Anon. (Gwyn Evans)		
The Sexton Blake Library (2nd Series) 222	The Masked Dancer	Anon. (William J. Bayfield)		
The Sexton Blake Library (2nd Series) 223	The Throne of Peril	Anon. (C. Malcolm Hincks)		
The Sexton Blake Library (2nd Series) 224	The Crook of Marsden Manor	Anon. (George Hamilton Teed)		
The Sexton Blake Library (2nd Series) 225	The Riddle of the Three Marked Men	Anon. (George N. Philips)		
The Sexton Blake Library (2nd Series) 226	The Fatal Car	Anon. (Rex Hardinge)		
The Sexton Blake Library (2nd Series) 227	The Secret of the Vault	Anon. (Donald Stuart)		
Plus:				
The Clue of the Music-Sheet		Anon. (Unknown)		
The Sexton Blake Library (2nd Series) 228	The Desert of Doom	Anon. (William Murray Graydon)		
The Sexton Blake Library (2nd Series) 229	The Mystery of Oldham	Anon. (Lester Bidston)		
The Sexton Blake Library (2nd Series) 230	The Victim of the Gang	Anon. (George Hamilton Teed)		
Plus:				
A Fight to the Death!		Anon.		
The Sexton Blake Library (2nd Series) 231	The Warehouse Murder	Anon. (Edward C. Davies)		
The Sexton Blake Library (2nd Series) 232	The Masked Raiders	Anon. (R. C. Armour)		
Plus:				
The Arson Mystery!		Anon. (Unknown)		
The Sexton Blake Library (2nd Series) 233	The Gangster's Revenge	Anon. (George N. Philips)		
The Sexton Blake Library (2nd Series) 234	Who Killed Trainer Lincoln?	Anon. (A. S. Hardy)		
The Sexton Blake Library (2nd Series) 235	The Masked Marauder	Anon. (Robert Murray Graydon)		
The Sexton Blake Library (2nd Series) 236	The Crook of Canada	Anon. (George Hamilton Teed)		
The Sexton Blake Library (2nd Series) 237	The Crime of Four	Anon. (Donald Stuart)		
The Sexton Blake Library (2nd Series) 238	The 'Talkie' Murder Mystery	Anon. (Walter Shute)		
The Sexton Blake Library (2nd Series) 239	Cassidy the Con Man	Anon. (George Hamilton Teed)		
The Sexton Blake Library (2nd Series) 240	The Feud of Fear	Anon. (William Murray Graydon)		
The Sexton Blake Library (2nd Series) 241	The Mission of Doom	Gwyn Evans		
The Sexton Blake Library (2nd Series) 242	Horror House	L. C. Douthwaite		
The Sexton Blake Library (2nd Series) 243	The Murder of Constable Cartwright	Allan Blair (William J. Bayfield)		
The Sexton Blake Library (2nd Series) 244	The Phantom Bat	R. C. Elliott		
The Sexton Blake Library (2nd Series) 245	The Trapper's Victim	Coutts Brisbane (R. C. Armour)		
The Sexton Blake Library (2nd Series) 246	The Crook's Accomplice	Anthony Skene (George N. Philips)		
The Sexton Blake Library (2nd Series) 247	The Masked Killer	George Hamilton Teed		
The Sexton Blake Library (2nd Series) 248	The Gangster's Deputy	Sidney Drew (E. J. Murray)		
The Sexton Blake Library (2nd Series) 249	The Case of the Crook Banker	Ladbroke Black		
The Sexton Blake Library (2nd Series) 250	The Secret of the Strong Room	George Hamilton Teed		
The Sexton Blake Library (2nd Series) 251	Gang's Orders	Michael Poole (Reginald H. Poole)		
The Sexton Blake Library (2nd Series) 252	The Mystery of the Monument	Allan Blair (William J. Bayfield)		
The Sexton Blake Library (2nd Series) 253	The House of Silence	George Hamilton Teed		
The Sexton Blake Library (2nd Series) 254	The Green-Room Crime	Gilbert Chester (H. H. C. Gibbons)		
The Sexton Blake Library (2nd Series) 255	The Death Card	Donald Stuart		
The Sexton Blake Library (2nd Series) 256	The Crook of Cranford Court	Lewis Essex (Levi Isaacs)		
The Sexton Blake Library (2nd Series) 257	The City of Crooks	Stacey Blake		
The Sexton Blake Library (2nd Series) 258	The Mission of Menace	Rex Hardinge		
The Sexton Blake Library (2nd Series) 259	The Informer	Ladbroke Black		
The Sexton Blake Library (2nd Series) 260	The Crime of Convict 13	William Murray Graydon		
The Sexton Blake Library (2nd Series) 261	The Death Trap	Anthony Skene (George N. Philips)		
The Sexton Blake Library (2nd Series) 262	The Crook of Paris	George Hamilton Teed		
The Sexton Blake Library (2nd Series) 263	The Gang's Deserter	Coutts Brisbane (R. C. Armour)		
The Sexton Blake Library (2nd Series) 264	The Law Courts Mystery	Allan Blair (William J. Bayfield)		
The Sexton Blake Library (2nd Series) 265	The Secret of the Thieves' Kitchen	George Hamilton Teed		
The Sexton Blake Library (2nd Series) 266	The Fence's Victim	Donald Stuart		
The Sexton Blake Library (2nd Series) 267	The Night Raiders	Anthony Skene (George N. Philips)		
The Sexton Blake Library (2nd Series) 268	The Lombard Street Mystery	Allan Blair (William J. Bayfield)		
The Thriller 1,181 (supplement)	Midnight Gold!	Anon. (Gilbert Chester)		
The Union Jack (2nd Series) 1,368	The Twilight Feather Case	George Hamilton Teed		
The Union Jack (2nd Series) 1,369	The Mystery of the Wailing Wall	Gwyn Evans		
The Union Jack (2nd Series) 1,370	The Six Green Arabs	Gwyn Evans		
The Union Jack (2nd Series) 1,371	Burden of Proof	R. L. Hadfield		
The Union Jack (2nd Series) 1,372	Gangsters' Gold	Anthony Skene (George N. Philips)		
The Union Jack (2nd Series) 1,373	The Plunder Plane	Rex Hardinge		
The Union Jack (2nd Series) 1,374	False Lights	Gilbert Chester (H. H. C. Gibbons)		
The Union Jack (2nd Series) 1,375	The Melodrama Mystery	Gwyn Evans		
The Union Jack (2nd Series) 1,376	Certified Insane	Gilbert Chester (H. H. C. Gibbons)		
The Union Jack (2nd Series) 1,377	Hidden Fangs	C. Malcolm Hincks		
The Union Jack (2nd Series) 1,378	They Shall Repay	George Hamilton Teed		
The Union Jack (2nd Series) 1,379	The Green Jester	Donald Stuart		
The Union Jack (2nd Series) 1,380	The Man From Devil's Island	George Hamilton Teed		
The Union Jack (2nd Series) 1,381	Buried Deep	Gilbert Chester (H. H. C. Gibbons)		
The Union Jack (2nd Series) 1,382	The Sniper	Anthony Skene (George N. Philips)		
The Union Jack (2nd Series) 1,383	The Brute of Saigon	George Hamilton Teed		
The Union Jack (2nd Series) 1,384	Quivering Steel	Edwy Searles Brooks		
The Union Jack (2nd Series) 1,385	The Broken Sphinx	Gwyn Evans		
The Union Jack (2nd Series) 1,386	Burning Wire	Reid Whitley (R. C. Armour)		
The Union Jack (2nd Series) 1,387	The Staring Stone	Gilbert Chester (H. H. C. Gibbons)		
The Union Jack (2nd Series) 1,388	Hunted Down	George Hamilton Teed		
The Union Jack (2nd Series) 1,389	The Headsman	Anthony Skene (George N. Philips)		
The Union Jack (2nd Series) 1,390	Jungle Justice	George Hamilton Teed		
The Union Jack (2nd Series) 1,391	Forestalled	George Hamilton Teed		
The Union Jack (2nd Series) 1,392	Black Brotherhood	Gwyn Evans		
The Union Jack (2nd Series) 1,393	Drums of Hate	Gwyn Evans		
The Union Jack (2nd Series) 1,394	Framed!	Robert Murray (Robert Murray Graydon)		
The Union Jack (2nd Series) 1,395	The Unknown	Robert Murray (Robert Murray Graydon)		
The Union Jack (2nd Series) 1,396	Blackmail	George Hamilton Teed		
The Union Jack (2nd Series) 1,397	Shanghaied	George Hamilton Teed		
The Union Jack (2nd Series) 1,398	The Grey Panther	Gwyn Evans		
The Union Jack (2nd Series) 1,399	Disgrace!	Gwyn Evans		
The Union Jack (2nd Series) 1,400	Fear	Gilbert Chester (H. H. C. Gibbons)		
The Union Jack (2nd Series) 1,401	Sinister Mill	George Hamilton Teed		
The Union Jack (2nd Series) 1,402	Killers' Creed	Anthony Skene (George N. Philips)		
The Union Jack (2nd Series) 1,403	Atonement	Francis Warwick		
The Union Jack (2nd Series) 1,404	The Coffin Ship	Gilbert Chester (H. H. C. Gibbons)		
The Union Jack (2nd Series) 1,405	The Hate Doctor	Anthony Skene (George N. Philips)		
The Union Jack (2nd Series) 1,406	The Man Who Sold Death	Rex Hardinge		
The Union Jack (2nd Series) 1,407	Twice Dead	Robert Murray (Robert Murray Graydon)		
The Union Jack (2nd Series) 1,408	The Fourth Mummy	David Macluire		
The Union Jack (2nd Series) 1,409	Crooks' Convention	Robert Murray (Robert Murray Graydon)		
The Union Jack (2nd Series) 1,410	The Shuttered Room	George Hamilton Teed		
The Union Jack (2nd Series) 1,411	Last of the Lynns	C. Malcolm Hincks		
The Union Jack (2nd Series) 1,412	Green Men	Anthony Skene (George N. Philips)		
The Union Jack (2nd Series) 1,413	Gang Justice	Gilbert Chester (H. H. C. Gibbons)		
The Union Jack (2nd Series) 1,414	Sexton Blake, Gangster	Robert Murray (Robert Murray Graydon)		
The Union Jack (2nd Series) 1,415	Manhunt	Gilbert Chester (H. H. C. Gibbons)		
The Union Jack (2nd Series) 1,416	Say it With Guns	Rex Hardinge		
The Union Jack (2nd Series) 1,417	The Man Who Hated Christmas	Gwyn Evans		
The Union Jack (2nd Series) 1,418	The Man From Chicago	George Hamilton Teed		
The Union Jack (2nd Series) 1,419	Crooks' Warning	Anthony Skene (George N. Philips)		

== 1931 ==
Publication	Title	Author	Key Characters	Notes
The Sexton Blake Library (2nd Series) 269	The Radio Crook	Rex Hardinge		
The Sexton Blake Library (2nd Series) 270	The Mystery Gangster	Gilbert Chester (H. H. C. Gibbons)		
The Sexton Blake Library (2nd Series) 271	The Death Sign	Gwyn Evans		
Plus:				
The Stolen Treaty		Anon. (Unknown)		
The Sexton Blake Library (2nd Series) 272	The Crime On Gallows Hill	George Hamilton Teed		
The Sexton Blake Library (2nd Series) 273	The Legacy of Fear	Anthony Skene (George N. Philips)		
The Sexton Blake Library (2nd Series) 274	Gang's Prisoners	Lester Bidston		
The Sexton Blake Library (2nd Series) 275	The Kidnapped Witness	Allan Blair (William J. Bayfield)		
The Sexton Blake Library (2nd Series) 276	The Victim of the Red Mask	Stanton Hope		
The Sexton Blake Library (2nd Series) 277	The Yellow Skull	George Hamilton Teed		
The Sexton Blake Library (2nd Series) 278	The Hooded Raider	Donald Stuart		
The Sexton Blake Library (2nd Series) 279	The Secret of the Sanatorium	Coutts Brisbane (R. C. Armour)		
The Sexton Blake Library (2nd Series) 280	Murder On the Marshes	Gilbert Chester (H. H. C. Gibbons)		
The Sexton Blake Library (2nd Series) 281	The Vault of Doom	Anthony Skene (George N. Philips)		
The Sexton Blake Library (2nd Series) 282	The Riddle of the Turkish Baths	Gwyn Evans		
The Sexton Blake Library (2nd Series) 283	The Ambush	Walter Edwards (Walter Shute)		
The Sexton Blake Library (2nd Series) 284	The Great Tunnel Mystery	Allan Blair (William J. Bayfield)		
The Sexton Blake Library (2nd Series) 285	The Crime of the Catacombs	George Hamilton Teed		
The Sexton Blake Library (2nd Series) 286	The Next Victim	Donald Stuart		
The Sexton Blake Library (2nd Series) 287	The Death House	Coutts Brisbane (R. C. Armour)		
The Sexton Blake Library (2nd Series) 288	The Great Shipyard Mystery	John Ascott (John W. Bobin)		
The Sexton Blake Library (2nd Series) 289	The Abandoned Car Crime	Gwyn Evans		
The Sexton Blake Library (2nd Series) 290	Exhumed!	Allan Blair (William J. Bayfield)		
The Sexton Blake Library (2nd Series) 291	The Death of Four	Anthony Skene (George N. Philips)		
The Sexton Blake Library (2nd Series) 292	The Crook from Chicago	Stephen Hood (Jack Lewis)		
The Sexton Blake Library (2nd Series) 293	The House of Curtains	George Hamilton Teed		
The Sexton Blake Library (2nd Series) 294	Dr. Duvene's Crime	Gilbert Chester (H. H. C. Gibbons)		
The Sexton Blake Library (2nd Series) 295	The Silent Syndicate	Lester Bidston		
The Sexton Blake Library (2nd Series) 296	The Death Ship	Stanton Hope		
The Sexton Blake Library (2nd Series) 297	Gang War	George Hamilton Teed		
The Sexton Blake Library (2nd Series) 298	The Night Club Crime	Anthony Skene (George N. Philips)		
The Sexton Blake Library (2nd Series) 299	The Murder of Munsden	Coutts Brisbane (R. C. Armour)		
The Sexton Blake Library (2nd Series) 300	The Fortnight of Fear	E. J. Murray		
The Sexton Blake Library (2nd Series) 301	The Boarding House Mystery	Mark Osborne (John W. Bobin)		
The Sexton Blake Library (2nd Series) 302	The Terror of Lonely Tor	Donald Stuart		
The Sexton Blake Library (2nd Series) 303	The Death Gang	Anthony Skene (George N. Philips)		
The Sexton Blake Library (2nd Series) 304	The Crook of Newmarket	A. S. Hardy		
The Sexton Blake Library (2nd Series) 305	Gun Rule	Paul Urquhart (L. L. Day Black)		
The Sexton Blake Library (2nd Series) 306	The Cross-Channel Crime	George Hamilton Teed		
The Sexton Blake Library (2nd Series) 307	The Fatal Wager	Allan Blair (William J. Bayfield)		
The Sexton Blake Library (2nd Series) 308	The Mission of Vengeance	Rex Hardinge		
The Sexton Blake Library (2nd Series) 309	The Nameless Five	Anthony Skene (George N. Philips)		
The Sexton Blake Library (2nd Series) 310	The Crook of Costa Blanca	George Hamilton Teed		
The Sexton Blake Library (2nd Series) 311	The Mansion House Mystery	E. J. Murray		
The Sexton Blake Library (2nd Series) 312	Steel Face	Gwyn Evans		
The Sexton Blake Library (2nd Series) 313	The Crystal Cell	Gwyn Evans		
The Sexton Blake Library (2nd Series) 314	The Garden City Crime	Donald Stuart		
The Sexton Blake Library (2nd Series) 315	The Mystery of the 13th Chest	Paul Urquhart (L. L. Day Black)		
The Sexton Blake Library (2nd Series) 316	The Fatal Alibi	Lester Bidston		
The Union Jack (2nd Series) 1,420	Night Birds	Anthony Skene (George N. Philips)		
The Union Jack (2nd Series) 1,421	Voodoo Vengeance	George Hamilton Teed		
The Union Jack (2nd Series) 1,422	Mr. Midnight	Donald Stuart		
The Union Jack (2nd Series) 1,423	Flat Fourteen	Gilbert Chester (H. H. C. Gibbons)		
The Union Jack (2nd Series) 1,424	Ambush!	Reid Whitley (R. C. Armour)		
The Union Jack (2nd Series) 1,425	The Red Hot Racketeers	Edwy Searles Brooks		
The Union Jack (2nd Series) 1,426	Red Tongues	Gilbert Chester (H. H. C. Gibbons)		
The Union Jack (2nd Series) 1,427	The Mole	Coutts Brisbane (R. C. Armour)		
The Union Jack (2nd Series) 1,428	Carmone Comes Across	Gilbert Chester (H. H. C. Gibbons)		
The Union Jack (2nd Series) 1,429	Loot!	David Macluire		
The Union Jack (2nd Series) 1,430	Crooks Haven	Gilbert Chester (H. H. C. Gibbons)		
The Union Jack (2nd Series) 1,431	Thugs!	Rex Hardinge		
The Union Jack (2nd Series) 1,432	Black Spaniard Creek	George Hamilton Teed		
The Union Jack (2nd Series) 1,433	Sexton Blake on the Spot	Edwy Searles Brooks		
The Union Jack (2nd Series) 1,434	Phantom Island	Gilbert Chester (H. H. C. Gibbons)		
The Union Jack (2nd Series) 1,435	Sexton Blake Cleans Up Chicago	Anthony Skene (George N. Philips)		
The Union Jack (2nd Series) 1,436	Under Cover	Gilbert Chester (H. H. C. Gibbons)		
The Union Jack (2nd Series) 1,437	Rival Racketeers	Rex Hardinge		
The Union Jack (2nd Series) 1,438	Yellow Guile	George Hamilton Teed		
The Union Jack (2nd Series) 1,439	The Needle Man	Norman Taylor (Noel Wood-Smith)		
The Union Jack (2nd Series) 1,440	Warning By Wire	William Murray Graydon		
The Union Jack (2nd Series) 1,441	Secrets For Sale	C. Malcolm Hincks		
The Union Jack (2nd Series) 1,442	The Catspaw	Anthony Skene (George N. Philips)		
The Union Jack (2nd Series) 1,443	The Whisperer	William Murray Graydon		
The Union Jack (2nd Series) 1,444	Sexton Blake Saves Blackpool	Gilbert Chester (H. H. C. Gibbons)		
The Union Jack (2nd Series) 1,445	Pearls of Peril	George Hamilton Teed		
The Union Jack (2nd Series) 1,446	The Q-Ships Mystery	Gilbert Chester (H. H. C. Gibbons)		
The Union Jack (2nd Series) 1,447	Bootleg Island	George Hamilton Teed		
The Union Jack (2nd Series) 1,448	Piracy!	George Hamilton Teed		
The Union Jack (2nd Series) 1,449	Bar Gold!	R. L. Hadfield		
The Union Jack (2nd Series) 1,450	Gangland Decree	George Hamilton Teed		
The Union Jack (2nd Series) 1,451	Menace Over Margate	Gilbert Chester (H. H. C. Gibbons)		
The Union Jack (2nd Series) 1,452	Lonely Farm	George Hamilton Teed		
The Union Jack (2nd Series) 1,453	The Death Squad	Rex Hardinge		
The Union Jack (2nd Series) 1,454	Doomed to Devil's Island	George Hamilton Teed		
The Union Jack (2nd Series) 1,455	Diamond Lure	Rex Hardinge		
The Union Jack (2nd Series) 1,456	Hot Lead	William Murray Graydon		
The Union Jack (2nd Series) 1,457	The Black Boomerang	Lewis Jackson (Jack Lewis)		
The Union Jack (2nd Series) 1,458	The Gang Girl	George Hamilton Teed		
The Union Jack (2nd Series) 1,459	The Bishop Murder Mystery	C. Malcolm Hincks		
The Union Jack (2nd Series) 1,460	The Red Swordsman	Robert Murray Graydon		
The Union Jack (2nd Series) 1,461	Spanish Gold	George Hamilton Teed		
The Union Jack (2nd Series) 1,462	The White Black	Coutts Brisbane (R. C. Armour)		
The Union Jack (2nd Series) 1,463	Crooks' Hotel	William Murray Graydon		
The Union Jack (2nd Series) 1,464	The Fifth Stair	Anthony Skene (George N. Philips)		
The Union Jack (2nd Series) 1,465	Doomed Ships	George Hamilton Teed		
The Union Jack (2nd Series) 1,466	The Man They Hanged	Stanley Gordon (S. G. Shaw)		
The Union Jack (2nd Series) 1,467	The Ghost Mobile	Gwyn Evans		
The Union Jack (2nd Series) 1,468	The Land Grabbers	Rex Hardinge		
The Union Jack (2nd Series) 1,469	A Corner in Crooks	Robert Murray (Robert Murray Graydon)		
The Union Jack (2nd Series) 1,470	The Phantom of the Pantomime	William J. Elliott		
The Union Jack (2nd Series) 1,471	Prisoner of the Harem	George Hamilton Teed		

== 1932 ==
Publication	Title	Author	Key Characters	Notes
The Sexton Blake Library (2nd Series) 317	Crook House	Anthony Skene (George N. Philips)		
The Sexton Blake Library (2nd Series) 318	The Town Hall Crime	Allan Blair (William J. Bayfield)		
The Sexton Blake Library (2nd Series) 319	The Chinatown Mystery	George Hamilton Teed		
The Sexton Blake Library (2nd Series) 320	The Masked Slayer	Rex Hardinge		
The Sexton Blake Library (2nd Series) 321	Sinister Castle	Gwyn Evans		
The Sexton Blake Library (2nd Series) 322	Dead Man's Secret	Donald Stuart		
The Sexton Blake Library (2nd Series) 323	The Mystery of the Rajah's Jewels	Paul Urquhart (L. L. Day Black)		
The Sexton Blake Library (2nd Series) 324	The Racketeer's Will	W. P. Vickery		
The Sexton Blake Library (2nd Series) 325	The Great Dumping Mystery	Warwick Jardine (Francis Warwick)		
The Sexton Blake Library (2nd Series) 326	The Palais De Danse Tragedy	Gilbert Chester (H. H. C. Gibbons)		
The Sexton Blake Library (2nd Series) 327	The Consulting Room Crime	Mark Osborne (John W. Bobin)		
The Sexton Blake Library (2nd Series) 328	Murder in the Air	Coutts Brisbane (R. C. Armour)		
The Sexton Blake Library (2nd Series) 329	The Cup Final Crime	Lester Bidston		
The Sexton Blake Library (2nd Series) 330	The Waiting Room Mystery	Allan Blair (William J. Bayfield)		
The Sexton Blake Library (2nd Series) 331	The Fatal Mascot	Anthony Skene (George N. Philips)		
The Sexton Blake Library (2nd Series) 332	The Secret of the African Trader	Rex Hardinge		
The Sexton Blake Library (2nd Series) 333	The Crook of Shanghai	George Hamilton Teed		
The Sexton Blake Library (2nd Series) 334	The Squealer's Secret	Donald Stuart		
The Sexton Blake Library (2nd Series) 335	Doomed Men	Warwick Jardine (Francis Warwick)		
The Sexton Blake Library (2nd Series) 336	The Brooklands Mystery	Paul Urquhart (L. L. Day Black)		
The Sexton Blake Library (2nd Series) 337	The Kennels Crime	Mark Osborne (John W. Bobin)		
The Sexton Blake Library (2nd Series) 338	The Secret of the Farm	Gilbert Chester (H. H. C. Gibbons)		
The Sexton Blake Library (2nd Series) 339	The Murder On the Moor	Walter Edwards (Walter Shute)		
The Sexton Blake Library (2nd Series) 340	The Fatal Talisman	Coutts Brisbane (R. C. Armour)		
The Sexton Blake Library (2nd Series) 341	The Embankment Crime	Donald Stuart		
The Sexton Blake Library (2nd Series) 342	The Mill of Fear	Lester Bidston		
The Sexton Blake Library (2nd Series) 343	The House of Cellars	George Hamilton Teed		
The Sexton Blake Library (2nd Series) 344	The Ghost Trail	L. C. Douthwaite		
The Sexton Blake Library (2nd Series) 345	Green Mask	Anthony Skene (George N. Philips)		
The Sexton Blake Library (2nd Series) 346	The Police Boat Mystery	Allan Blair (William J. Bayfield)		
The Sexton Blake Library (2nd Series) 347	The Cruise of Terror	Stanton Hope		
The Sexton Blake Library (2nd Series) 348	The Bungalow Crime	Paul Urquhart (L. L. Day Black)		
The Sexton Blake Library (2nd Series) 349	Crooks' Loot	Warwick Jardine (Francis Warwick)		
The Sexton Blake Library (2nd Series) 350	The Case of the Missing Estate Agent	Donald Stuart		
The Sexton Blake Library (2nd Series) 351	The Studio Crime	Gilbert Chester (H. H. C. Gibbons)		
The Sexton Blake Library (2nd Series) 352	The Man from Dartmoor	Gwyn Evans		
The Sexton Blake Library (2nd Series) 353	The Phantom of the Creek	George Hamilton Teed		
The Sexton Blake Library (2nd Series) 354	Presumed Dead	Paul Urquhart (L. L. Day Black)		
The Sexton Blake Library (2nd Series) 355	The Mystery of the Reunion Dinner	Rex Hardinge		
The Sexton Blake Library (2nd Series) 356	The Red Stiletto	Anthony Skene (George N. Philips)		
The Sexton Blake Library (2nd Series) 357	The Great Waxworks Crime	Gwyn Evans		
The Sexton Blake Library (2nd Series) 358	Dead Man's Bay	Mark Osborne (John W. Bobin)		
The Sexton Blake Library (2nd Series) 359	The Night Safe Mystery	Lewis Carlton		
The Sexton Blake Library (2nd Series) 360	The Lincoln's Inn Tragedy	Allan Blair (William J. Bayfield)		
The Sexton Blake Library (2nd Series) 361	The Murder On the Broads	Gilbert Chester (H. H. C. Gibbons)		
The Sexton Blake Library (2nd Series) 362	The Crook of Monte Carlo	George Hamilton Teed		
The Sexton Blake Library (2nd Series) 363	The Secret of Seven	Donald Stuart		
The Sexton Blake Library (2nd Series) 364	The Trafalgar Square Mystery	Coutts Brisbane (R. C. Armour)		
The Union Jack (2nd Series) 1,472	Confederation Calling!	Robert Murray (Robert Murray Graydon)		
The Union Jack (2nd Series) 1,473	Death Over Africa	Rex Hardinge		
The Union Jack (2nd Series) 1,474	Planned From Paris	George Hamilton Teed		
The Union Jack (2nd Series) 1,475	The Tree of Evil	Rex Hardinge		
The Union Jack (2nd Series) 1,476	Reece's Recruit	Robert Murray (Robert Murray Graydon)		
The Union Jack (2nd Series) 1,477	Aerial Gold!	Gilbert Chester (H. H. C. Gibbons)		
The Union Jack (2nd Series) 1,478	Lost in the Legion	George Hamilton Teed		
The Union Jack (2nd Series) 1,479	Wry House	Anthony Skene (George N. Philips)		
The Union Jack (2nd Series) 1,480	Wind Blown Blackmail	Robert Murray (Robert Murray Graydon)		
The Union Jack (2nd Series) 1,481	The League of the Onion Men	Gwyn Evans		
The Union Jack (2nd Series) 1,482	The Secret	George Hamilton Teed		
The Union Jack (2nd Series) 1,483	The Mystery of Bluebeard's Key	Gwyn Evans		
The Union Jack (2nd Series) 1,484	Enter the President	H. W. Twyman		
The Union Jack (2nd Series) 1,485	The Proud Tram Mystery	Gilbert Chester (H. H. C. Gibbons)		
The Union Jack (2nd Series) 1,486	The Crook Crusaders	Anthony Skene (George N. Philips)		
The Union Jack (2nd Series) 1,487	Revolt!	George Hamilton Teed		
The Union Jack (2nd Series) 1,488	The Witches Moon	Donald Stuart		
The Union Jack (2nd Series) 1,489	Fear Haunted!	Gwyn Evans		
The Union Jack (2nd Series) 1,490	The Mystery of Blind Luke	Edwy Searles Brooks		
The Union Jack (2nd Series) 1,491	The Monkey Men	Rex Hardinge		
The Union Jack (2nd Series) 1,492	Dirk Dolland's Ordeal	Robert Murray (Robert Murray Graydon)		
The Union Jack (2nd Series) 1,493	The Plague of the Onion Men	Gwyn Evans		
The Union Jack (2nd Series) 1,494	Sexton Blake in Manchuria	George Hamilton Teed		
The Union Jack (2nd Series) 1,495	Arms to Wu Ling	George Hamilton Teed		
The Union Jack (2nd Series) 1,496	The Diamond of Disaster	Robert Murray (Robert Murray Graydon)		
The Union Jack (2nd Series) 1,497	The Blood Brothers of Nan-Hu	George Hamilton Teed		
The Union Jack (2nd Series) 1,498	The Fifth Key	Gwyn Evans		
The Union Jack (2nd Series) 1,499	"Once a Crook—"	Edwy Searles Brooks		
The Union Jack (2nd Series) 1,500	Volcano Island	Robert Murray (Robert Murray Graydon)		
The Union Jack (2nd Series) 1,501	Waldo's Way Out	Edwy Searles Brooks		
The Union Jack (2nd Series) 1,502	The Lightning Murders	Strawford Webber (D. W. Pile)		
The Union Jack (2nd Series) 1,503	Honolulu Lure	George Hamilton Teed		
The Union Jack (2nd Series) 1,504	The Trail in the Sand	Robert Murray (Robert Murray Graydon)		
The Union Jack (2nd Series) 1,505	The Rain Maker	Anthony Skene (George N. Philips)		
The Union Jack (2nd Series) 1,506	The Crime of the Creek	George Hamilton Teed		
The Union Jack (2nd Series) 1,507	Red Sand	Edwy Searles Brooks		
The Union Jack (2nd Series) 1,508	The Squealer	Robert Murray (Robert Murray Graydon)		
The Union Jack (2nd Series) 1,509	The Death Insurance Policy	Gilbert Chester (H. H. C. Gibbons)		
The Union Jack (2nd Series) 1,510	The Gold Maker	Anthony Skene (George N. Philips)		
The Union Jack (2nd Series) 1,511	The Ghost Hole	Rex Hardinge		
The Union Jack (2nd Series) 1,512	The Four Guests Mystery	Robert Murray (Robert Murray Graydon)		
The Union Jack (2nd Series) 1,513	Crooks Divided	Robert Murray (Robert Murray Graydon)		
The Union Jack (2nd Series) 1,514	The Motor Show Mystery	D. W. Pile		
The Union Jack (2nd Series) 1,515	Crooks Cargo	David Macluire		
The Union Jack (2nd Series) 1,516	Sexton Blake's Understudy	Edwy Searles Brooks		
Plus:				
The Next Move (part 1)	George Hamilton Teed			
The Union Jack (2nd Series) 1,517	The War Memorial Murders	Rex Hardinge		
Plus:				
The Next Move (part 2)	Gwyn Evans			
The Union Jack (2nd Series) 1,518	The Shadow	Robert Murray (Robert Murray Graydon)		
Plus:				
The Next Move (part 3)	Robert Murray (Robert Murray Graydon)			
The Union Jack (2nd Series) 1,519	Suspended From Duty	Gwyn Evans		
Plus:				
The Next Move (part 4)	Anthony Skene (George N. Philips)			
The Union Jack (2nd Series) 1,520	The Hunted Man	Coutts Brisbane (R. C. Armour)		
Plus:				
The Next Move (part 5)	George Hamilton Teed			
The Union Jack (2nd Series) 1,521	The Masked Carollers	Gwyn Evans		
Plus:				
The Next Move (part 6)	Gwyn Evans			
The Union Jack (2nd Series) 1,522	The Secret Passage Murder	C. Malcolm Hincks		
Plus:				
The Next Move (part 7)	Robert Murray (Robert Murray Graydon)			
The Union Jack (2nd Series) 1,523	The Crimson Smile	Donald Stuart		
Plus:				
The Next Move (part 8)	Anthony Skene (George N. Philips)			
The Union Jack (2nd Series) 1,524	Men of the Mask	Gilbert Chester (H. H. C. Gibbons)		
Plus:				
The Next Move (part 9)	George Hamilton Teed			

== 1933 ==
Publication	Title	Author	Key Characters	Notes
Boys' Friend Library 388	Sexton Blake's Schooldays	John Andrews (Cecil Hayter)		
Boys' Friend Library 392	Sexton Blake — Sixth-Former	John Andrews (Cecil Hayter)		
Boys' Friend Library 396	Sexton Blake at the Varsity	John Andrews (Cecil Hayter)		
Detective Weekly 1	Sexton Blake's Secret	Lewis Jackson (Jack Lewis)		
Detective Weekly 2	Sexton Blake at Bay	Lewis Jackson (Jack Lewis)		
Detective Weekly 3	The Silent Woman	George Hamilton Teed		
Detective Weekly 4	Sexton Blake's Triumph	Lewis Jackson (Jack Lewis)		
Detective Weekly 5	The Falcon of Fambridge	Anthony Skene (George N. Philips)		
Detective Weekly 6	The Chocolate King Mystery	George Hamilton Teed		
Detective Weekly 7	The Tramp in Dress Clothes	Rex Hardinge		
Detective Weekly 8	The Box of Ho Sen	Anthony Skene (George N. Philips)		
Detective Weekly 9	Wanted!	Mark Osborne (John W. Bobin)		
Detective Weekly 10	Pauper's Island	Gilbert Chester (H. H. C. Gibbons)		
Detective Weekly 11	The Hollow Giant	Edwy Searles Brooks		
Detective Weekly 12	Perilous Pearls	George Hamilton Teed		
Detective Weekly 13	The Monster of Paris	Lewis Jackson (Jack Lewis)		
Detective Weekly 14	The Seven Dead Matches Mystery	Anthony Skene (George N. Philips)		
Detective Weekly 15	Marked Men	Rex Hardinge		
Detective Weekly 16	Gambler's Gold	George Hamilton Teed		
Detective Weekly 17	The Man Who Stole Life	Anthony Skene (George N. Philips)		
Detective Weekly 18	The Netted Man Mystery	Gilbert Chester (H. H. C. Gibbons)		
Detective Weekly 19	The Tree Top Murder	Edwy Searles Brooks		
Detective Weekly 20	The Man I Killed	Rex Hardinge		
Detective Weekly 21	Seeds of Sleep	Anthony Skene (George N. Philips)		
Detective Weekly 22	The Banker's Box	George Hamilton Teed		
Detective Weekly 23	The Man Who Would Not Speak	David Macluire		
Detective Weekly 24	Decoy!	Gilbert Chester (H. H. C. Gibbons)		
Detective Weekly 25	Frame-Up!	George Hamilton Teed		
Detective Weekly 26	The Crime Zone	Anthony Skene (George N. Philips)		
Detective Weekly 27	Sinister Cliff	Rex Hardinge		
Detective Weekly 28	The Hired Avenger	Edwy Searles Brooks		
Detective Weekly 29	The Affair of the Fake Astrologer	Gilbert Chester (H. H. C. Gibbons)		
Detective Weekly 30	The Devil's Gap Mystery	Reid Whitley (R. C. Armour)		
Detective Weekly 31	The Secret of the Slums	George Hamilton Teed		
Detective Weekly 32	Death in the Mine	Anthony Skene (George N. Philips)		
Detective Weekly 33	Pool of Escape	Edwy Searles Brooks		
Detective Weekly 34	The Singing Clue	Frank Lelland (A. M. Burrage)		
Detective Weekly 35	The Stolen Lion Mystery	Rex Hardinge		
Detective Weekly 36	Black Traffic!	George Hamilton Teed		
Detective Weekly 37	The Great Rocket Mystery	Robert L. Hadfield		
Detective Weekly 38	The King Crook's Comeback	Gwyn Evans		
Detective Weekly 39	Conspiracy in Cuba!	Gilbert Chester (H. H. C. Gibbons)		
Detective Weekly 40	The Blood Brothers of Formosa	George Hamilton Teed		
Detective Weekly 41	The Doomsman of the Double Four	Gwyn Evans		
Detective Weekly 42	The Music Hall Murder Mystery	Rex Hardinge		
Detective Weekly 43	The Christmas Circus Mystery	Gwyn Evans		
Detective Weekly 44	The Clue of the Crimson Snow	Donald Stuart		
Detective Weekly 45	The Legacy of Doom	Paul Urquhart (L. L. Day Black)		
The Sexton Blake Library (2nd Series) 365	The Survivor's Secret	J. G. Brandon		
The Sexton Blake Library (2nd Series) 366	Yellow Vengeance	Paul Urquhart (L. L. Day Black)		
The Sexton Blake Library (2nd Series) 367	The Mystery of the Lost Legionnaire	Mark Osborne (John W. Bobin)		
The Sexton Blake Library (2nd Series) 368	The Derelict House	Anthony Skene (George N. Philips)		
The Sexton Blake Library (2nd Series) 369	The Secret of the Sudan	Warwick Jardine (Francis Warwick)		
The Sexton Blake Library (2nd Series) 370	Dr. Sinister	Gwyn Evans		
The Sexton Blake Library (2nd Series) 371	The Mystery of the Tramp Steamer	Coutts Brisbane (R. C. Armour)		
The Sexton Blake Library (2nd Series) 372	The Arterial Road Murder	Allan Blair (William J. Bayfield)		
The Sexton Blake Library (2nd Series) 373	The Empty House Murder	Donald Stuart		
The Sexton Blake Library (2nd Series) 374	The Circus Crime	Anthony Skene (George N. Philips)		
The Sexton Blake Library (2nd Series) 375	The Black-Hill Murder Case	Rex Hardinge		
The Sexton Blake Library (2nd Series) 376	The Isle of Horror	George Hamilton Teed		
The Sexton Blake Library (2nd Series) 377	The Mystery of the Unknown Victim	Warwick Jardine (Francis Warwick)		
The Sexton Blake Library (2nd Series) 378	The Stables Crime	Mark Osborne (John W. Bobin)		
The Sexton Blake Library (2nd Series) 379	The Double-Cross	Paul Urquhart (L. L. Day Black)		
The Sexton Blake Library (2nd Series) 380	The Fatal Friendship	Gwyn Evans		
The Sexton Blake Library (2nd Series) 381	The Silent Menace	Anthony Skene (George N. Philips)		
The Sexton Blake Library (2nd Series) 382	The Man from Dublin	Allan Blair (William J. Bayfield)		
The Sexton Blake Library (2nd Series) 383	The Motor Coach Murder	Lester Bidston		
The Sexton Blake Library (2nd Series) 384	Rogues of Ransom	George Hamilton Teed		
The Sexton Blake Library (2nd Series) 385	Guilty But Insane	Donald Stuart		
The Sexton Blake Library (2nd Series) 386	Murder To Music	Gilbert Chester (H. H. C. Gibbons)		
The Sexton Blake Library (2nd Series) 387	Dead Man's Peak	Coutts Brisbane (R. C. Armour)		
The Sexton Blake Library (2nd Series) 388	The Hiker's Secret	Walter Edwards (Walter Shute)		
The Sexton Blake Library (2nd Series) 389	The Pleasure Cruise Murder	Warwick Jardine (Francis Warwick)		
The Sexton Blake Library (2nd Series) 390	Death in the Jungle	Gwyn Evans		
The Sexton Blake Library (2nd Series) 391	The Crook's Decoy	George Hamilton Teed		
The Sexton Blake Library (2nd Series) 392	The Cinema Crime	Richard Goyne		
The Sexton Blake Library (2nd Series) 393	The £1,000,000 Plot	Anthony Skene (George N. Philips)		
The Sexton Blake Library (2nd Series) 394	The Crime On the Clyde	Gilbert Chester (H. H. C. Gibbons)		
The Sexton Blake Library (2nd Series) 395	The Case of the Stranded Touring Company	Lewis Carlton		
The Sexton Blake Library (2nd Series) 396	Mr. Kilner Sees Red	Paul Urquhart (L. L. Day Black)		
The Sexton Blake Library (2nd Series) 397	The Taxi-Cab Murder	J. G. Brandon		
The Sexton Blake Library (2nd Series) 398	The Ivory Tusk	Rex Hardinge		
The Sexton Blake Library (2nd Series) 399	The Great Turf Fraud	Allan Blair (William J. Bayfield)		
The Sexton Blake Library (2nd Series) 400	The Secret of the Loch	Coutts Brisbane (R. C. Armour)		
The Sexton Blake Library (2nd Series) 401	The 1,000,000 Film Murder	Donald Stuart		
The Sexton Blake Library (2nd Series) 402	The Mystery of the Old Age Pensioner	George Hamilton Teed		
The Sexton Blake Library (2nd Series) 403	The Crime in Park Lane	Warwick Jardine (Francis Warwick)		
The Sexton Blake Library (2nd Series) 404	The Victim of Devil's Alley	Paul Urquhart (L. L. Day Black)		
The Sexton Blake Library (2nd Series) 405	The Roadhouse Murder	Anthony Skene (George N. Philips)		
The Sexton Blake Library (2nd Series) 406	The Black Dagger	Edwy Searles Brooks		
The Sexton Blake Library (2nd Series) 407	The Case of the Bogus Prince	Gilbert Chester (H. H. C. Gibbons)		
The Sexton Blake Library (2nd Series) 408	The Lord Mayor's Show Mystery	Allan Blair (William J. Bayfield)		
The Sexton Blake Library (2nd Series) 409	The Man from Tokio	Warwick Jardine (Francis Warwick)		
The Sexton Blake Library (2nd Series) 410	On Ticket of Leave	Stacey Blake		
The Sexton Blake Library (2nd Series) 411	The Tragedy of the West End Actress	J. G. Brandon		
The Sexton Blake Library (2nd Series) 412	Dr. Ferraro's Frame-Up	Coutts Brisbane (R. C. Armour)		
The Union Jack (2nd Series) 1,525	The Call of the Dragon	Arthur J. Palk		
Plus:				
The Next Move (part 10)	Gwyn Evans			
The Union Jack (2nd Series) 1,526	Behind the Fog	Robert Murray (Robert Murray Graydon)		
Plus:				
The Next Move (part 11)	Robert Murray (Robert Murray Graydon)			
The Union Jack (2nd Series) 1,527	Stolen Identity	Gilbert Chester (H. H. C. Gibbons)		
Plus:				
The Next Move (part 12)	Anthony Skene (George N. Philips)			
The Union Jack (2nd Series) 1,528	The House of Light	Edwy Searles Brooks		
Plus:				
The Next Move (part 13)	George Hamilton Teed			
The Union Jack (2nd Series) 1,529	Sexton Blake Wins!	Robert Murray (Robert Murray Graydon)		
Plus:				
The Next Move (part 14)	Robert Murray (Robert Murray Graydon)			
The Union Jack (2nd Series) 1,530	Village Vengeance	Edwy Searles Brooks		
The Union Jack (2nd Series) 1,531	The Land of Lost Men	Rex Hardinge		

== 1934 ==
Publication	Title	Author	Key Characters	Notes
Detective Weekly 46	The Affair of the Missing Financier	George Hamilton Teed		
Detective Weekly 47	The Mystery of the Molten Bell	Gilbert Chester (H. H. C. Gibbons)		
Detective Weekly 48	From Information Received	Edwy Searles Brooks		
Detective Weekly 49	The Man Behind the Curtains	Gerald Bowman		
Detective Weekly 50	The Mysterious Dr. Maldoom	George E. Rochester		
Detective Weekly 51	The House of the Hanging Sword	Gwyn Evans		
Detective Weekly 52	The Studio Murder Mystery	Reid Whitley (R. C. Armour)		
Detective Weekly 53	The Case of the Shuttered Room	Anthony Skene (George N. Philips)		
Detective Weekly 54	The Riddle of the Five Strange Guests	Edwy Searles Brooks		
Detective Weekly 55	The Clue of the Extra Ace	Gilbert Chester (H. H. C. Gibbons)		
Detective Weekly 56	The Man with the Rubber Face	John G. Brandon		
Detective Weekly 57	The Mystery of Monk's Island	George E. Rochester		
Detective Weekly 58	The Four from Devil's Island	Roland Howard (W. L. Catchpole)		
Detective Weekly 59	The Case of the Spanish Cabinet	A. S. Hardy		
Detective Weekly 60	The Sign of the Silhouette	Pierre Quiroule (W. W. Sayer)		
Detective Weekly 61	The Mystery of the Red Barn	Paul Urquhart (L. L. Day Black)		
Detective Weekly 62	The Secret of the Whispering Wharf	Gerald Bowman		
Detective Weekly 63	Murder by Magic!	Louis Brittany (George Hamilton Teed)		
Detective Weekly 64	Sinister Villa	Paul Urquhart (L. L. Day Black)		
Detective Weekly 65	The Affair of the Secret Treaty	John G. Brandon		
Detective Weekly 66	The Mystery of the Miser Landlord	Edwy Searles Brooks		
Detective Weekly 67	The Riddle of the Demon Dwarf	Bruce Chaverton (Fred G. Cook)		
Detective Weekly 68	The Tenement Murder Mystery	Mark Osborne (John W. Bobin)		
Detective Weekly 69	The Sky Bandits	George E. Rochester		
Detective Weekly 70	The Case of the Muttering Drum	Coutts Brisbane (R. C. Armour)		
Detective Weekly 71	The Clue of the Corsican Collar	Anthony Skene (George N. Philips)		
Detective Weekly 72	Crooks' Convoy	Gilbert Chester (H. H. C. Gibbons)		
Detective Weekly 73	The Panic Liner Plot	Lewis Jackson (Jack Lewis)		
Detective Weekly 74	The King Crooks Ultimatum	Gwyn Evans		
Detective Weekly 75	The Mystery of the Master Potter	Gerald Bowman		
Detective Weekly 76	The Crossword Murder Puzzle	Coutts Brisbane (R. C. Armour)		
Detective Weekly 77	Death at Derelict Ranch!	George E. Rochester		
Detective Weekly 78	The Mystery of the Yellow Envelopes	Gwyn Evans		
Detective Weekly 79	The Spanish Circle Conspiracy	George D. Woodman		
Detective Weekly 80	The Mill House Mystery	C. Malcolm Hincks		
Detective Weekly 81	The Medium Murder Case	Anthony Skene (George N. Philips)		
Detective Weekly 82	The Mystery at Moat Farm	Paul Urquhart (L. L. Day Black)		
Detective Weekly 83	The Riddle of the Bootless Man	Pierre Quiroule (W. W. Sayer)		
Detective Weekly 84	The Mystery of the Woman in Black	Louis Brittany (George Hamilton Teed)		
Detective Weekly 85	The Man Who Knew Too Much	Gilbert Chester (H. H. C. Gibbons)		
Detective Weekly 86	The News Reel Alibi	Rex Hardinge		
Detective Weekly 87	The Blinding Clue	Anthony Skene (George N. Philips)		
Detective Weekly 88	The Mauritius Stamp Mystery	C. Malcolm Hincks		
Detective Weekly 89	The Fire Fiends	Roland Howard (W. L. Catchpole)		
Detective Weekly 90	The Ringside Racketeers	Stawford Webber (D. W. Pile)		
Detective Weekly 91	The Painted Clue	A. S. Hardy		
Detective Weekly 92	The Clue on the Blotter	Anthony Skene (George N. Philips)		
Detective Weekly 93	A Secret from the Thames	Edwy Searles Brooks		
Detective Weekly 94	At the Sign of the Hanging Man	George E. Rochester		
Detective Weekly 95	Due for Sentence	Paul Urquhart (L. L. Day Black)		
Plus:				
The Christmas Cavalier	Gwyn Evans			
Detective Weekly 96	The Christmas Card Crime	Donald Stuart		
Detective Weekly 97	The Secret of the S.S. Malvado	Gilbert Chester (H. H. C. Gibbons)		
The Sexton Blake Library (2nd Series) 413	The Black Cap	Gwyn Evans		
The Sexton Blake Library (2nd Series) 414	The Great Art Gallery Crime	Mark Osborne (John W. Bobin)		
The Sexton Blake Library (2nd Series) 415	Murder in Manchuria	George Hamilton Teed		
The Sexton Blake Library (2nd Series) 416	Dead Man's Diary	Pierre Quiroule (W. W. Sayer)		
The Sexton Blake Library (2nd Series) 417	The Mystery of the Three Cities	J. G. Brandon		
The Sexton Blake Library (2nd Series) 418	Missing Men	Anthony Skene (George N. Philips)		
The Sexton Blake Library (2nd Series) 419	The Case of the Deportee	Gilbert Chester (H. H. C. Gibbons)		
The Sexton Blake Library (2nd Series) 420	The Secret of the Woods	Pierre Quiroule (W. W. Sayer)		
The Sexton Blake Library (2nd Series) 421	The Chink's Victim	J. G. Brandon		
The Sexton Blake Library (2nd Series) 422	The Motor Bus Murder	Donald Stuart		
The Sexton Blake Library (2nd Series) 423	The Missing Spy	Pierre Quiroule (W. W. Sayer)		
The Sexton Blake Library (2nd Series) 424	The Blazing Garage Crime	Allan Blair (William J. Bayfield)		
The Sexton Blake Library (2nd Series) 425	The Glass Dagger	J. G. Brandon		
The Sexton Blake Library (2nd Series) 426	The Riders of the Sands	Pierre Quiroule (W. W. Sayer)		
The Sexton Blake Library (2nd Series) 427	The Building Estate Murder	Paul Urquhart (L. L. Day Black)		
The Sexton Blake Library (2nd Series) 428	The Man from Holland	Rex Hardinge		
The Sexton Blake Library (2nd Series) 429	The Harley Street Murder	Warwick Jardine (Francis Warwick)		
The Sexton Blake Library (2nd Series) 430	The Village of Fear	Donald Stuart		
The Sexton Blake Library (2nd Series) 431	The Great Stores Crime	Lester Bidston		
The Sexton Blake Library (2nd Series) 432	The Mystery Box	W. W. Sayer		
The Sexton Blake Library (2nd Series) 433	Murder On the Stage	J. G. Brandon		
The Sexton Blake Library (2nd Series) 434	The Case of the Crook Iron-master	Mark Osborne (John W. Bobin)		
The Sexton Blake Library (2nd Series) 435	The Caravan Crime	Gilbert Chester (H. H. C. Gibbons)		
The Sexton Blake Library (2nd Series) 436	The Red Mountain	Pierre Quiroule (W. W. Sayer)		
The Sexton Blake Library (2nd Series) 437	The Championship Crime	J. G. Brandon		
The Sexton Blake Library (2nd Series) 438	The Mystery of the Murdered Chef	Rex Hardinge		
The Sexton Blake Library (2nd Series) 439	The Fatal Memoirs	Walter Edwards (Walter Shute)		
The Sexton Blake Library (2nd Series) 440	The Phantom of the Pacific	Pierre Quiroule (W. W. Sayer)		
The Sexton Blake Library (2nd Series) 441	The Mystery of Cell 13	George Hamilton Teed		
The Sexton Blake Library (2nd Series) 442	Murder by Mistake	Paul Urquhart (L. L. Day Black)		
The Sexton Blake Library (2nd Series) 443	The Sacred City	Pierre Quiroule (W. W. Sayer)		
The Sexton Blake Library (2nd Series) 444	The Crime at the Seaside Hotel	Allan Blair (William J. Bayfield)		
The Sexton Blake Library (2nd Series) 445	Under Police Protection	J. G. Brandon		
The Sexton Blake Library (2nd Series) 446	The British Museum Mystery	Warwick Jardine (Francis Warwick)		
The Sexton Blake Library (2nd Series) 447	The Riverside Club Murder	Anthony Skene (George N. Philips)		
The Sexton Blake Library (2nd Series) 448	The Red Domino	Pierre Quiroule (W. W. Sayer)		
The Sexton Blake Library (2nd Series) 449	The Blazing Launch Murder	Rex Hardinge		
The Sexton Blake Library (2nd Series) 450	The Secret Temple	Coutts Brisbane (R. C. Armour)		
The Sexton Blake Library (2nd Series) 451	The Living Shadow	Pierre Quiroule (W. W. Sayer)		
The Sexton Blake Library (2nd Series) 452	The Salvage Pirates	Gilbert Chester (H. H. C. Gibbons)		
The Sexton Blake Library (2nd Series) 453	On the Midnight Beat	J. G. Brandon		
The Sexton Blake Library (2nd Series) 454	The Dog Track Murder	Mark Osborne (John W. Bobin)		
The Sexton Blake Library (2nd Series) 455	The Outlaw of Yugoslavia	Pierre Quiroule (W. W. Sayer)		
The Sexton Blake Library (2nd Series) 456	The Fatal Amulet	George Hamilton Teed		
The Sexton Blake Library (2nd Series) 457	The Crime At the Cross Roads	Paul Urquhart (L. L. Day Black)		
The Sexton Blake Library (2nd Series) 458	The Case of the Five Dummy Books	Pierre Quiroule (W. W. Sayer)		
The Sexton Blake Library (2nd Series) 459	The Cloakroom Murder	Warwick Jardine (Francis Warwick)		
The Sexton Blake Library (2nd Series) 460	The Kidnapper's Victim	Richard Goyne		

== 1935 ==
Publication	Title	Author	Key Characters	Notes
Detective Weekly 98	Time for Murder	Coutts Brisbane (R. C. Armour)		
Detective Weekly 99	Murder on the Midnight Coach	Edwy Searles Brooks		
Detective Weekly 100	The Master Terrorist	George E. Rochester		
Detective Weekly 101	The Mystery of the Girl in Blue	George Hamilton Teed		
Detective Weekly 102	A Clue in Gold	A. S. Hardy		
Detective Weekly 103	The Case of the Paris Assassin	George D. Woodman		
Detective Weekly 104	The Mystery of the Murder Blooms	Gilbert Chester (H. H. C. Gibbons)		
Detective Weekly 105	The Vicarage Murder Case	Paul Urquhart (L. L. Day Black)		
Detective Weekly 106	Murder at Full Moon	Frank Lelland (A. M. Burrage)		
Detective Weekly 107	The Case of the Victims of Blackfell Pit	George E. Rochester		
Detective Weekly 108	Death at the Zoo!	Coutts Brisbane (R. C. Armour)		
Detective Weekly 109	The Sarcophagus Murder Case	Roland Howard (W. L. Catchpole)		
Detective Weekly 110	The Girl with the Frightened Eyes	Edwy Searles Brooks		
Detective Weekly 111	Murder at the Microphone	Donald Stuart		
Detective Weekly 112	The Hot Cross Bun Murders	Gwyn Evans		
Detective Weekly 113	The 'Pepper-Box' Mystery	Gilbert Chester (H. H. C. Gibbons)		
Detective Weekly 114	The Mystery of the Roman Vase	Anthony Ford		
Detective Weekly 115	Murder at Moat House	A. S. Hardy		
Detective Weekly 116	Death of a Film Star	Francis Brent (Alfred John Hunter)		
Detective Weekly 117	The Man With the Rats	Gilbert Chester (H. H. C. Gibbons)		
Detective Weekly 118	The Phantom Broadcast Mystery	Rex Hardinge		
Detective Weekly 119	The Great Steelworks Mystery	George E. Rochester		
Detective Weekly 120	The Bathing Pool Mystery	Paul Urquhart (L. L. Day Black)		
Detective Weekly 121	Murder at the Tower of London	Coutts Brisbane (R. C. Armour)		
Detective Weekly 122	The Case of the Sun God's Secret	Anthony Ford		
Detective Weekly 123	The Flaming Terror	Robert Murray (Robert Murray Graydon)		
Detective Weekly 124	Death in the Barber's Chair	George Hamilton Teed		
Detective Weekly 125	The Case of the Double Alibi	Gerald Bowman		
Detective Weekly 126	The Mystery of the Girl with the Gun	A. S. Hardy		
Detective Weekly 127	The Crime at Lone House	Robert Murray (Robert Murray Graydon)		
Detective Weekly 128	The Fire Tongs Murder Mystery	Edwy Searles Brooks		
Detective Weekly 129	The Crime on the Underground	C. Malcolm Hincks		
Detective Weekly 130	Make Up for Murder	Anthony Ford		
The Sexton Blake Library (2nd Series) 461	The Case of the Gangster's Moll	J. G. Brandon		
The Sexton Blake Library (2nd Series) 462	The Slaver's Secret	Pierre Quiroule (W. W. Sayer)		
The Sexton Blake Library (2nd Series) 463	The Crimson Belt	George Hamilton Teed		
The Sexton Blake Library (2nd Series) 464	The Rush Hour Crime	Anthony Skene (George N. Philips)		
The Sexton Blake Library (2nd Series) 465	The Tithe War Mystery	Gilbert Chester (H. H. C. Gibbons)		
The Sexton Blake Library (2nd Series) 466	The Secret of Smuggler's Cove	Rex Hardinge		
The Sexton Blake Library (2nd Series) 467	The Vanished Million	Pierre Quiroule (W. W. Sayer)		
The Sexton Blake Library (2nd Series) 468	The Crime of Count Duveen	Paul Urquhart (L. L. Day Black)		
The Sexton Blake Library (2nd Series) 469	The Downing Street Discovery	J. G. Brandon		
The Sexton Blake Library (2nd Series) 470	The Secret of the Sealed Room	Donald Stuart		
The Sexton Blake Library (2nd Series) 471	The Forest of Fortune	Pierre Quiroule (W. W. Sayer)		
The Sexton Blake Library (2nd Series) 472	The Mystery of Becher's Brook	Allan Blair (William J. Bayfield)		
The Sexton Blake Library (2nd Series) 473	The Secret of the Glacier	Warwick Jardine (Francis Warwick)		
The Sexton Blake Library (2nd Series) 474	The Martello Tower Mystery	George Hamilton Teed		
The Sexton Blake Library (2nd Series) 475	The Man With the Black Wallet	Pierre Quiroule (W. W. Sayer)		
The Sexton Blake Library (2nd Series) 476	The Case of the Murdered Pawnbroker	Walter Edwards (Walter Shute)		
The Sexton Blake Library (2nd Series) 477	The Yellow Mask	J. G. Brandon		
The Sexton Blake Library (2nd Series) 478	The Nursing Home Crime	Coutts Brisbane (R. C. Armour)		
The Sexton Blake Library (2nd Series) 479	The Mystery of the Rajah's Son	Hylton Gregory (H. Egbert Hill)		
The Sexton Blake Library (2nd Series) 480	The Case of the Crook Councillor	Allan Blair (William J. Bayfield)		
The Sexton Blake Library (2nd Series) 481	The Cottage of Terror	Donald Stuart		
The Sexton Blake Library (2nd Series) 482	The Case of the Missing Ships	Stanton Hope		
The Sexton Blake Library (2nd Series) 483	The Secret of the Gold Locket	Pierre Quiroule (W. W. Sayer)		
The Sexton Blake Library (2nd Series) 484	The Bookmaker's Crime	A. S. Hardy		
The Sexton Blake Library (2nd Series) 485	The Case of the Black Magician	Rex Hardinge		
The Sexton Blake Library (2nd Series) 486	Murder in Y Division	J. G. Brandon		
The Sexton Blake Library (2nd Series) 487	The Crime On the Moor	T. C. Bridges		
The Sexton Blake Library (2nd Series) 488	The Curse of Kali	Hylton Gregory (H. Egbert Hill)		
The Sexton Blake Library (2nd Series) 489	The Affair of the Fatal Film	John Hunter		
The Sexton Blake Library (2nd Series) 490	The Beauty Parlour Murder	Gilbert Chester (H. H. C. Gibbons)		
The Sexton Blake Library (2nd Series) 491	The Secret of the Armaments King	Pierre Quiroule (W. W. Sayer)		
The Sexton Blake Library (2nd Series) 492	The Bathing Pool Mystery	Allan Blair (William J. Bayfield)		
The Sexton Blake Library (2nd Series) 493	The Red Boomerang	J. G. Brandon		
The Sexton Blake Library (2nd Series) 494	Murder On the Pier	Gilbert Chester (H. H. C. Gibbons)		
The Sexton Blake Library (2nd Series) 495	The Mystery of the Cashiered Officer	George Hamilton Teed		
The Sexton Blake Library (2nd Series) 496	The Touring Company Crime	A. S. Hardy		
The Sexton Blake Library (2nd Series) 497	The Crime in Carson's Shack	Rex Hardinge		
The Sexton Blake Library (2nd Series) 498	By Order of the Tong	J. G. Brandon		
The Sexton Blake Library (2nd Series) 499	The Case of the Murdered Taxi Driver	Allan Blair (William J. Bayfield)		
The Sexton Blake Library (2nd Series) 500	The Man in Brown	Walter Edwards (Walter Shute)		
The Sexton Blake Library (2nd Series) 501	The Stolen Test Tube	Warwick Jardine (Francis Warwick)		
The Sexton Blake Library (2nd Series) 502	The Secret of the Glen	Coutts Brisbane (R. C. Armour)		
The Sexton Blake Library (2nd Series) 503	The Truth About Lord Trench	Donald Stuart		
The Sexton Blake Library (2nd Series) 504	The Havana Mystery	Pierre Quiroule (W. W. Sayer)		
The Sexton Blake Library (2nd Series) 505	The Case of the Murdered Commissionaire	J. G. Brandon		
The Sexton Blake Library (2nd Series) 506	The Abyssinian Mystery	Gilbert Chester (H. H. C. Gibbons)		
The Sexton Blake Library (2nd Series) 507	The Secret Inquest	Allan Blair (William J. Bayfield)		
The Sexton Blake Library (2nd Series) 508	The Soho Cafe Crime	Pierre Quiroule (W. W. Sayer)		

== 1936 ==
Publication	Title	Author	Key Characters	Notes
The Boys' Friend Library 515	The Stunt Club	Walter Edwards		
The London Evening Standard	Sexton Blake Solves It	Pierre Quiroule (W. W. Sayer)		
The Sexton Blake Library (2nd Series) 509	The Case of the Night Club Queen	J. G. Brandon		
The Sexton Blake Library (2nd Series) 510	Murder On the Boat Express	Rex Hardinge		
The Sexton Blake Library (2nd Series) 511	Blind Man's Secret	Pierre Quiroule (W. W. Sayer)		
The Sexton Blake Library (2nd Series) 512	The Mystery of the Albanian Avenger	Pierre Quiroule (W. W. Sayer)		
The Sexton Blake Library (2nd Series) 513	The Case of the Murdered Wedding Guest	Warwick Jardine (Francis Warwick)		
The Sexton Blake Library (2nd Series) 514	The Mystery of the Greek Exile	Gilbert Chester (H. H. C. Gibbons)		
The Sexton Blake Library (2nd Series) 515	The Terror of Thunder Creek	Stanton Hope		
The Sexton Blake Library (2nd Series) 516	The Crime at the Quay	Allan Blair (William J. Bayfield)		
The Sexton Blake Library (2nd Series) 517	Dead Man's Evidence	J. G. Brandon		
The Sexton Blake Library (2nd Series) 518	The Mystery of the African Mine	Rex Hardinge		
The Sexton Blake Library (2nd Series) 519	The Victim of the Girl Spy	Maurice B. Dix		
The Sexton Blake Library (2nd Series) 520	The Secret of the Tong	Hylton Gregory (H. Egbert Hill)		
The Sexton Blake Library (2nd Series) 521	Murder On the Fourth Floor	J. G. Brandon		
The Sexton Blake Library (2nd Series) 522	The Secret of the Steps	Gilbert Chester (H. H. C. Gibbons)		
The Sexton Blake Library (2nd Series) 523	The Lost Expedition	Pierre Quiroule (W. W. Sayer)		
The Sexton Blake Library (2nd Series) 524	The Crime at the Crown Inn	Martin Frazer (Percy A. Clarke)		
The Sexton Blake Library (2nd Series) 525	The Murder at the Hermit's Cottage	Rex Hardinge		
The Sexton Blake Library (2nd Series) 526	The Secret of the Balkan Heiress	Coutts Brisbane (R. C. Armour)		
The Sexton Blake Library (2nd Series) 527	The Old Bailey Mystery	Allan Blair (William J. Bayfield)		
The Sexton Blake Library (2nd Series) 528	The Barber's Shop Crime	Walter Edwards (Walter Shute)		
The Sexton Blake Library (2nd Series) 529	The Mystery of the Murdered Blonde	J. G. Brandon		
The Sexton Blake Library (2nd Series) 530	The Seaside Crime	Warwick Jardine (Francis Warwick)		
The Sexton Blake Library (2nd Series) 531	The Case of the Brass-Bound Trunk	Gilbert Chester (H. H. C. Gibbons)		
The Sexton Blake Library (2nd Series) 532	The Ethiopian's Secret	Pierre Quiroule (W. W. Sayer)		
The Sexton Blake Library (2nd Series) 533	The Ex-Serviceman's Secret	Rex Hardinge		
The Sexton Blake Library (2nd Series) 534	The Crime of Gunga Dass	Coutts Brisbane (R. C. Armour)		
The Sexton Blake Library (2nd Series) 535	The Girl Who Knew Too Much	J. G. Brandon		
The Sexton Blake Library (2nd Series) 536	The Island of the Guilty	George Hamilton Teed		
The Sexton Blake Library (2nd Series) 537	The Secret of the Sale Room	Rex Hardinge		
The Sexton Blake Library (2nd Series) 538	The Man With the Glaring Eyes	Allan Blair (William J. Bayfield)		
The Sexton Blake Library (2nd Series) 539	The Stage Door Crime	Gilbert Chester (H. H. C. Gibbons)		
The Sexton Blake Library (2nd Series) 540	The 100,000 Insurance Swindle	Pierre Quiroule (W. W. Sayer)		
The Sexton Blake Library (2nd Series) 541	The Trail of the Dope Chief	John Hunter		
The Sexton Blake Library (2nd Series) 542	The Case of the Three Absconding Swindlers	Coutts Brisbane (R. C. Armour)		
The Sexton Blake Library (2nd Series) 543	The Seaside Cafe Crime	Warwick Jardine (Francis Warwick)		
The Sexton Blake Library (2nd Series) 544	The Secret of the Identification Parade	Walter Edwards (Walter Shute)		
The Sexton Blake Library (2nd Series) 545	The Bells of Doom	Donald Stuart		
The Sexton Blake Library (2nd Series) 546	The Mystery of the Old Curiosity Shop	Gilbert Chester (H. H. C. Gibbons)		
The Sexton Blake Library (2nd Series) 547	The Motor Show Mystery	Rex Hardinge		
The Sexton Blake Library (2nd Series) 548	The Dictator's Secret	George Hamilton Teed		
The Sexton Blake Library (2nd Series) 549	Crook Cargo	John Hunter		
The Sexton Blake Library (2nd Series) 550	The Trail of the White Turban	Coutts Brisbane (R. C. Armour)		
The Sexton Blake Library (2nd Series) 551	The Victim of the Thieves' Den	J. G. Brandon		
The Sexton Blake Library (2nd Series) 552	The Dockyard Mystery	Stanton Hope		
The Sexton Blake Library (2nd Series) 553	The Case of the Long-Firm Frauds	Mark Osborne (John W. Bobin)		
The Sexton Blake Library (2nd Series) 554	The Taximan's Quest	Gilbert Chester (H. H. C. Gibbons)		
The Sexton Blake Library (2nd Series) 555	The Priest's Secret	Allan Maxwell (W. J. Bayfield)		
The Sexton Blake Library (2nd Series) 556	The Mystery of the Three Acrobats	J. G. Brandon		

== 1937 ==
Publication	Title	Author	Key Characters	Notes
Detective Weekly 251	The Mystery of Senor Z	Warwick Jardine (Francis Warwick)		
Detective Weekly 253	Mr. Smith — Gang-Smasher!	Paul Urquhart (L. L. Day Black)		
Pilot 74	Sexton Blake at School (part 1)	Anon. (John Garbutt)		
Pilot 75	Sexton Blake at School (part 2)	Anon. (John Garbutt)		
Pilot 76	Sexton Blake at School (part 3)	Anon. (John Garbutt)		
Pilot 77	Sexton Blake at School (part 4)	Anon. (John Garbutt)		
Pilot 78	Sexton Blake at School (part 5)	Anon. (John Garbutt)		
Pilot 79	Sexton Blake at School (part 6)	Anon. (John Garbutt)		
Pilot 80	Sexton Blake at School (part 7)	Anon. (John Garbutt)		
Pilot 80	Sexton Blake at School (part 8)	Anon. (John Garbutt)		
Pilot 82	Sexton Blake at School (part 9)	Anon. (John Garbutt)		
Pilot 83	Sexton Blake at School (part 10)	Anon. (John Garbutt)		
Pilot 84	Sexton Blake at School (part 11)	Anon. (John Garbutt)		
Pilot 85	Sexton Blake at School (part 12)	Anon. (John Garbutt)		
Pilot 86	Sexton Blake at School (part 13)	Anon. (John Garbutt)		
Pilot 87	Sexton Blake at School (part 14)	Anon. (John Garbutt)		
Pilot 88	Sexton Blake at School (part 15)	Anon. (John Garbutt)		
Pilot 89	Sexton Blake at School (part 16)	Anon. (John Garbutt)		
Pilot 90	Sexton Blake at School (part 17)	Anon. (John Garbutt)		
Pilot 91	Sexton Blake at School (part 18)	Anon. (John Garbutt)		
Pilot 99	They Came to Spy (part 1)	John Brearley (John Garbutt)		
Pilot 100	They Came to Spy (part 2)	John Brearley (John Garbutt)		
Pilot 101	They Came to Spy (part 3)	John Brearley (John Garbutt)		
Pilot 102	They Came to Spy (part 4)	John Brearley (John Garbutt)		
Pilot 103	They Came to Spy (part 5)	John Brearley (John Garbutt)		
Pilot 104	They Came to Spy (part 6)	John Brearley (John Garbutt)		
Pilot 105	They Came to Spy (part 7)	John Brearley (John Garbutt)		
Pilot 106	They Came to Spy (part 8)	John Brearley (John Garbutt)		
Pilot 107	They Came to Spy (part 9)	John Brearley (John Garbutt)		
Pilot 108	They Came to Spy (part 10)	John Brearley (John Garbutt)		
The Sexton Blake Library (2nd Series) 557	The Secret of the Dental Surgeon	Rex Hardinge		
The Sexton Blake Library (2nd Series) 558	The Mystery of X.20	J. G. Brandon		
The Sexton Blake Library (2nd Series) 559	The Midnight Lorry Crime	Edwy Searles Brooks		
The Sexton Blake Library (2nd Series) 560	The Riddle of the Dead Man's Mine	Martin Frazer (Percy A. Clarke)		
The Sexton Blake Library (2nd Series) 561	The Unknown Menace	Donald Stuart		
The Sexton Blake Library (2nd Series) 562	The Case of the Murdered Financier ·John Creasey			
The Sexton Blake Library (2nd Series) 563	The Mystery of the Blackmailed Baronet	Hylton Gregory (H. Egbert Hill)		
The Sexton Blake Library (2nd Series) 564	The Man from Moscow	Gilbert Chester (H. H. C. Gibbons)		
The Sexton Blake Library (2nd Series) 565	The Mystery of the Murdered Sentry	J. G. Brandon		
The Sexton Blake Library (2nd Series) 566	The Terror of the Tenements	Anthony Skene (George N. Philips)		
The Sexton Blake Library (2nd Series) 567	The Secret of the Dead Convict	Maurice B. Dix		
The Sexton Blake Library (2nd Series) 568	The Case of the Man Who Never Slept	Gwyn Evans		
The Sexton Blake Library (2nd Series) 569	The Mystery of No.13 Caversham Square	Pierre Quiroule (W. W. Sayer)		
The Sexton Blake Library (2nd Series) 570	The Victim of the Cult	Warwick Jardine (Francis Warwick)		
The Sexton Blake Library (2nd Series) 571	The Riddle of Five Needle Creek	Allan Blair (William J. Bayfield)		
The Sexton Blake Library (2nd Series) 572	The Crime in the Kiosk	J. G. Brandon		
The Sexton Blake Library (2nd Series) 573	The Coronation Mystery	Gilbert Chester (H. H. C. Gibbons)		
The Sexton Blake Library (2nd Series) 574	The Crime On the Heath	C. Vernon Frost		
Plus:				
Trapped!		Anon. (Unknown)		
The Sexton Blake Library (2nd Series) 575	The Bond Street Raiders	J. G. Brandon		
The Sexton Blake Library (2nd Series) 576	The Curse of the Santyres	Gwyn Evans		
The Sexton Blake Library (2nd Series) 577	Raffles vs Sexton Blake	Barry Perowne (P. Atkey)		
The Sexton Blake Library (2nd Series) 578	The Prisoner of Lost Island	John Hunter		
The Sexton Blake Library (2nd Series) 579	The Tattooed Triangle	J. G. Brandon		
The Sexton Blake Library (2nd Series) 580	The Man They Could Not Convict	Rex Hardinge		
The Sexton Blake Library (2nd Series) 581	The Riddle of the Sunken Garden	Donald Stuart		
The Sexton Blake Library (2nd Series) 582	The Mystery of the Swanley Viaduct	Anthony Skene (George N. Philips)		
The Sexton Blake Library (2nd Series) 583	The Man from Italy	J. G. Brandon		
The Sexton Blake Library (2nd Series) 584	The Devil's Own	G. M. Bowman		
The Sexton Blake Library (2nd Series) 585	The Crime On the Promenade	John Hunter		
The Sexton Blake Library (2nd Series) 586	The Charity Fund Mystery	Gilbert Chester (H. H. C. Gibbons)		
The Sexton Blake Library (2nd Series) 587	The Masked Man of the Desert	Coutts Brisbane (R. C. Armour)		
The Sexton Blake Library (2nd Series) 588	The Body On the Beach	Rex Hardinge		
The Sexton Blake Library (2nd Series) 589	The Mystery of the Missing Aviator	Pierre Quiroule (W. W. Sayer)		
The Sexton Blake Library (2nd Series) 590	The Great Canal Plot	George Hamilton Teed		
The Sexton Blake Library (2nd Series) 591	The Diamonds of Ti Ling	J. G. Brandon		
The Sexton Blake Library (2nd Series) 592	The Mystery of the Marchers	Walter Edwards (Walter Shute)		
The Sexton Blake Library (2nd Series) 593	The Boro' Council Ramp	Paul Urquhart (L. L. Day Black)		
The Sexton Blake Library (2nd Series) 594	The Stolen Submarine	Stanton Hope		
The Sexton Blake Library (2nd Series) 595	The Melbourne Mystery	J. G. Brandon		
The Sexton Blake Library (2nd Series) 596	The Secret of the Ten Bales	Anthony Parsons		
The Sexton Blake Library (2nd Series) 597	The Mystery of the African Expedition	Rex Hardinge		
The Sexton Blake Library (2nd Series) 598	The Crime Reporter's Secret	George Dilnot		
The Sexton Blake Library (2nd Series) 599	The Case of the Blackmailed Banker	Allan Blair (William J. Bayfield)		
The Sexton Blake Library (2nd Series) 600	The Pavement Artist Mystery	Warwick Jardine (Francis Warwick)		
The Sexton Blake Library (2nd Series) 601	Raffles' Crime in Gibraltar	Barry Perowne (P. Atkey)		
The Sexton Blake Library (2nd Series) 602	The House On the Cliffs	Gilbert Chester (H. H. C. Gibbons)		
The Sexton Blake Library (2nd Series) 603	The Victim of the Secret Service	J. G. Brandon		
The Sexton Blake Library (2nd Series) 604	The Crook of Fleet Street	Gwyn Evans		

== 1938 ==
Publication	Title	Author	Key Characters	Notes
Sexton Blake Annual 1	The Sundowner's Secret; The Mystery of the Dumb Men; Scuttler's Cache; The House in Berkeley Square; The "Shanghai" Ship; The Fatal 13th Who Was Guilty? The Inn-Keeper's Fate; The House of Judas; The Unwritten Law; The Sinister Scientist; The Case of the Rancher Earl; The Mystery Millionaire			Anthology
Detective Weekly 255	The Man With the Purple Scar	Rex Hardinge		
Detective Weekly 257	The Black Dagger Crimes	Edwy Searles Brooks		
Detective Weekly 259	The Magician of Soho	Gwyn Evans		
Detective Weekly 261	The Fog Devils	Gilbert Chester (H. H. C. Gibbons)		
Detective Weekly 263	The Secret of the Last Survivor	Pierre Quiroule (W. W. Sayer)		
Detective Weekly 265	Limehouse Loot	George Hamilton Teed		
Detective Weekly 266	The Riddle of the Phantom Coach	John Baron		
Detective Weekly 267	The Case of the Crook Oil King	Anthony Skene (George N. Philips)		
Detective Weekly 268	The Riddle of the Fake Clues	Anon. (Unknown)		
Detective Weekly 269	The Radio Crook	Rex Hardinge		
Detective Weekly 271	The Secret of Plan YK	Gilbert Chester (H. H. C. Gibbons)		
Detective Weekly 273	The Great Milk Racket	Gwyn Evans		
Detective Weekly 276	The Strange Case of the Sinister Uncles	Rex Hardinge		
Detective Weekly 278	The Sinister Dr. Satira	Robert Murray (Robert Murray Graydon)		
Detective Weekly 280	The Riddle of the Royal Oak	Ladbroke Black		
Detective Weekly 282	Where is Dr. Satira?	Robert Murray (Robert Murray Graydon)		
Detective Weekly 284	The Bride of Doom	Anthony Skene (George N. Philips)		
Detective Weekly 286	Bait for Dr. Satira	Robert Murray (Robert Murray Graydon)		
Detective Weekly 288	The Hour of Fear	Gilbert Chester (H. H. C. Gibbons)		
Detective Weekly 290	The Man from Alcatraz	Gilbert Chester (H. H. C. Gibbons)		
Detective Weekly 292	Warning from Dr. Satira	Robert Murray (Robert Murray Graydon)		
Detective Weekly 294	The Man Who Sold Secrets	Anthony Skene (George N. Philips)		
Detective Weekly 296	The Miser of Marl House	Robert Murray (Robert Murray Graydon)		
Detective Weekly 298	The Adventure of the Pearl Pirates	George Hamilton Teed		
Detective Weekly 300	Dr. Satira's Revenge	Robert Murray (Robert Murray Graydon)		
Detective Weekly 302	The Trail of the Black Knight	George Hamilton Teed		
Detective Weekly 304	The Clue of the Painted Smile	Donald Stuart		
Detective Weekly 306	Dr. Satira Stakes All	Robert Murray (Robert Murray Graydon)		
Pilot 118	The Flaming Frontier (part 1)	John Brearley (John Garbutt)		
Pilot 119	The Flaming Frontier (part 2)	John Brearley (John Garbutt)		
Pilot 120	The Flaming Frontier (part 3)	John Brearley (John Garbutt)		
Pilot 121	The Flaming Frontier (part 4)	John Brearley (John Garbutt)		
Pilot 122	The Flaming Frontier (part 5)	John Brearley (John Garbutt)		
Pilot 123	The Flaming Frontier (part 6)	John Brearley (John Garbutt)		
Pilot 124	The Flaming Frontier (part 7)	John Brearley (John Garbutt)		
Pilot 125	The Flaming Frontier (part 8)	John Brearley (John Garbutt)		
Pilot 126	The Flaming Frontier (part 9)	John Brearley (John Garbutt)		
Pilot 127	The Flaming Frontier (part 10)	John Brearley (John Garbutt)		
Pilot 128	The Flaming Frontier (part 11)	John Brearley (John Garbutt)		
Pilot 129	The Flaming Frontier (part 12)	John Brearley (John Garbutt)		
The Sexton Blake Library (2nd Series) 605	The Time of the Crime	Donald Stuart		
The Sexton Blake Library (2nd Series) 606	The Spy from Spain	J. G. Brandon		
The Sexton Blake Library (2nd Series) 607	The Three Lepers' Heads	Pierre Quiroule (W. W. Sayer)		
The Sexton Blake Library (2nd Series) 608	The Bailiff's Secret	George Hamilton Teed		
The Sexton Blake Library (2nd Series) 609	The Lift Shaft Crime	Warwick Jardine (Francis Warwick)		
The Sexton Blake Library (2nd Series) 610	The Mystery of the Missing Doctor	Coutts Brisbane (R. C. Armour)		
The Sexton Blake Library (2nd Series) 611	The Secret of the Sunken Ships	Gilbert Chester (H. H. C. Gibbons)		
The Sexton Blake Library (2nd Series) 612	The Three Who Paid	Donald Stuart		
The Sexton Blake Library (2nd Series) 613	The Black Ace	George Dilnot		
The Sexton Blake Library (2nd Series) 614	The Secret of the Hold	John Hunter		
The Sexton Blake Library (2nd Series) 615	The Terror of Tangier	George Hamilton Teed		
The Sexton Blake Library (2nd Series) 616	The False Alibi	J. G. Brandon		
The Sexton Blake Library (2nd Series) 617	The Riddle of Big Ben	Anthony Parsons		
The Sexton Blake Library (2nd Series) 618	The Case of the Murdered Postman	Rex Hardinge		
The Sexton Blake Library (2nd Series) 619	The Mystery of the Street Musician	J. G. Brandon		
The Sexton Blake Library (2nd Series) 620	The Excavator's Secret	Gilbert Chester (H. H. C. Gibbons)		
The Sexton Blake Library (2nd Series) 621	The Mystery of No.7 Bitton Court	Pierre Quiroule (W. W. Sayer)		
The Sexton Blake Library (2nd Series) 622	The Pigeon Loft Crime	J. G. Brandon		
The Sexton Blake Library (2nd Series) 623	The Prisoners of Peru	Gwyn Evans		
The Sexton Blake Library (2nd Series) 624	Crooks' Convoy	Allan Blair (William J. Bayfield)		
The Sexton Blake Library (2nd Series) 625	The Man Who Turned King's Evidence	John Hunter		
The Sexton Blake Library (2nd Series) 626	The Secret of a Dead Man	Paul Urquhart (L. L. Day Black)		
The Sexton Blake Library (2nd Series) 627	The Newspaper Seller's Secret	Walter Edwards (Walter Shute)		
The Sexton Blake Library (2nd Series) 628	The Tiger of Canton	George Hamilton Teed		
The Sexton Blake Library (2nd Series) 629	The Case of the Kidnapped Specialist	Rex Hardinge		
The Sexton Blake Library (2nd Series) 630	The Hated Eight	Pierre Quiroule (W. W. Sayer)		
The Sexton Blake Library (2nd Series) 631	The Fatal Pit	Mark Osborne (John W. Bobin)		
The Sexton Blake Library (2nd Series) 632	The Roadhouse Mystery	J. G. Brandon		
The Sexton Blake Library (2nd Series) 633	The Hire-Purchase Crime	Gilbert Chester (H. H. C. Gibbons)		
The Sexton Blake Library (2nd Series) 634	The Secret of Moor House	Donald Stuart		
The Sexton Blake Library (2nd Series) 635	The Case of the Poisoned Pen	Gwyn Evans		
The Sexton Blake Library (2nd Series) 636	The Mystery of the Murdered Ice Cream Man	J. G. Brandon		
The Sexton Blake Library (2nd Series) 637	Dangerous Money	Rex Hardinge		
The Sexton Blake Library (2nd Series) 638	The 'Allah's Eye' Conspiracy	Anthony Parsons		
The Sexton Blake Library (2nd Series) 639	The Mystery of the Missing Constable	Allan Blair (William J. Bayfield)		
The Sexton Blake Library (2nd Series) 640	The Case of the Disguised Apache	George Hamilton Teed		
The Sexton Blake Library (2nd Series) 641	The Three Frightened Men	Berkeley Gray (E. S. Brooks)		
The Sexton Blake Library (2nd Series) 642	The Case of the Missing Bridegroom	George Dilnot		
The Sexton Blake Library (2nd Series) 643	Murder On the High Seas	J. G. Brandon		
The Sexton Blake Library (2nd Series) 644	The Mystery of the Film City	George Hamilton Teed		
The Sexton Blake Library (2nd Series) 645	Danger At Westways	Donald Stuart		
The Sexton Blake Library (2nd Series) 646	The Giant City Swindle	Anthony Skene (George N. Philips)		
The Sexton Blake Library (2nd Series) 647	The Mystery of the Dead Man's Wallet	J. G. Brandon		
The Sexton Blake Library (2nd Series) 648	The Suspected Six	Hedley Scott		
The Sexton Blake Library (2nd Series) 649	The Secret At Sixty-Six Fathoms	Stanton Hope		
The Sexton Blake Library (2nd Series) 650	The Man On the Dole	Paul Urquhart (L. L. Day Black)		
The Sexton Blake Library (2nd Series) 651	The Secret of the Snows	Gilbert Chester (H. H. C. Gibbons)		
The Sexton Blake Library (2nd Series) 652	The Clue of the Tattooed Man	J. G. Brandon		

== 1939 ==
Publication	Title	Author	Key Characters	Notes
The Boys' Friend Library 655	They Came to Spy	John Brearley (John Garbutt)		
The Boys' Friend Library 671	The Flaming Frontier	John Brearley (John Garbutt)		
The Boys' Friend Library 687	The Stationmaster's Secret	John Andrews (H. A. Hinton)		
The Boys' Friend Library 691	The Mystery of the Dope Den	John Andrews (H. A. Hinton)		
The Boys' Friend Library 698	The Secret of the Missing Convict	John Andrews (H. A. Hinton)		
Detective Weekly 308	The Island of Lost Men	George Hamilton Teed		
Detective Weekly 310	Sexton Blake versus the House of Cynos	Robert Murray (Robert Murray Graydon)		
Plus:				
Enter Sexton Blake (part 1)	Berkeley Gray (E. S. Brooks)			
Detective Weekly 311	Paul Cynos Demands a Million-Pound Revenge	Robert Murray (Robert Murray Graydon)		
Plus:				
Enter Sexton Blake (part 2)	Berkeley Gray (E. S. Brooks)			
Detective Weekly 312	The Trail of the Red Sombrero	George Hamilton Teed		
Plus:				
Enter Sexton Blake (part 3)	Berkeley Gray (E. S. Brooks)			
Detective Weekly 313	The Big Smash	Robert Murray (Robert Murray Graydon)		
Plus:				
Enter Sexton Blake (part 4)	Berkeley Gray (E. S. Brooks)			
Detective Weekly 314	Four to Die!	Anthony Skene (George N. Philips)		
Plus:				
Enter Sexton Blake (part 5)	Berkeley Gray (E. S. Brooks)			
Detective Weekly 315	The Wolf of Paris	George Hamilton Teed		
Plus:				
Enter Sexton Blake (part 6)	Berkeley Gray (E. S. Brooks)			
Detective Weekly 316	Justice at Bay	Robert Murray (Robert Murray Graydon)		
Plus:				
Enter Sexton Blake (part 7)	Berkeley Gray (E. S. Brooks)			
Detective Weekly 317	The Clue of the Flaming Phoenix	Gilbert Chester (H. H. C. Gibbons)		
Plus:				
Enter Sexton Blake (part 8)	Berkeley Gray (E. S. Brooks)			
Detective Weekly 318	Mr. Walker Wants to Know	Ernest Dudley		
Plus:				
Enter Sexton Blake (part 9)	Berkeley Gray (E. S. Brooks)			
Detective Weekly 319	The Poisoner	Gwyn Evans		
Plus:				
Enter Sexton Blake (part 10)	Berkeley Gray (E. S. Brooks)			
Detective Weekly 320	The Phantom of the Veldt	Rex Hardinge		
Plus:				
Enter Sexton Blake (part 11)	Berkeley Gray (E. S. Brooks)			
Detective Weekly 321	Don Rico's Millions	George Hamilton Teed		
Plus:				
Enter Sexton Blake (part 12)	Berkeley Gray (E. S. Brooks)			
Detective Weekly 322	The Man on the Stairs	Gwyn Evans		
Detective Weekly 323	Zenith the Albino!	Anthony Skene (George N. Philips)		
Detective Weekly 324	The Phantom Pearler	Rex Hardinge		
Detective Weekly 325	What Would You Do?	Ernest Dudley		
Detective Weekly 326	Guilty But Insane	Robert Murray (Robert Murray Graydon)		
Detective Weekly 327	Oil Pirates!	Stacey Blake		
Detective Weekly 328	The Whistler!	Warwick Jardine (Francis Warwick)		
Detective Weekly 329	The Blonde Bombshell	George Hamilton (George Hamilton Teed)		
Detective Weekly 330	Waldo the Wonder-Man	Edwy Searles Brooks		
Detective Weekly 331	The Great Glacier Bay Plot	Stacey Blake		
Detective Weekly 332	The Professional Avenger	Edwy Searles Brooks		
Plus:				
The Fatal Formula (part 1)	Rex Hardinge			
Detective Weekly 333	The Gallows Hill Mystery	George Hamilton Teed		
Plus:				
The Fatal Formula (part 2)	Rex Hardinge			
Detective Weekly 334	The Agony Ad' Mystery	Anthony Skene (George N. Philips)		
Plus:				
The Fatal Formula (part 3)	Rex Hardinge			
Detective Weekly 335	The Case of the Borgia's Vengeance	Gwyn Evans		
Plus:				
The Fatal Formula (part 4)	Rex Hardinge			
Detective Weekly 336	Waldo's Wonder Stunt	Edwy Searles Brooks		
Plus:				
The Fatal Formula (part 5)	Rex Hardinge			
Detective Weekly 337	The Riddle of the King Crook's Messenger	Gilbert Chester (H. H. C. Gibbons)		
Plus:				
The Fatal Formula (part 6)	Rex Hardinge			
Detective Weekly 338	The Fort of Lost Men	George Hamilton (George Hamilton Teed)		
Plus:				
The Fatal Formula (part 7)	Rex Hardinge			
Detective Weekly 339	Yellow Face	Anthony Skene (George N. Philips)		
Detective Weekly 340	Simon Kern Pays in Full	Edwy Searles Brooks		
Detective Weekly 341	The Carrier Pigeon Plot	Gilbert Chester (H. H. C. Gibbons)		
Detective Weekly 342	The Gnomid	Gilbert Chester (H. H. C. Gibbons)		
Detective Weekly 343	The Werewolf Mystery	Anthony Skene (George N. Philips)		
Detective Weekly 344	The Banknote Bandits	Donald Bobin		
Detective Weekly 345	The Man Who Bought Youth	Ladbroke Black		
Detective Weekly 346	The Case of the Blazing Island	George Hamilton Teed		
Detective Weekly 347	The Doctor's Dupes	Andrew Murray		
Detective Weekly 348	The Great Racing Racket	William J. Bayfield		
Detective Weekly 349	Danger in Diamonds	Andrew Murray		
Detective Weekly 350	The Circle of Steel	Mark Osborne (John W. Bobin)		
Detective Weekly 351	The Girl Who Made Pearls	George Hamilton Teed		
Detective Weekly 352	Rats of London's River	Andrew Murray		
Detective Weekly 353	President Plummer	Norman Goddard		
Detective Weekly 354	The Case of the Purple Cotton	George Hamilton Teed		
Detective Weekly 355	The Green Eye of Banyah	George Hamilton Teed		
Detective Weekly 356	The Leering Castle Crime	Andrew Murray		
Detective Weekly 357	The Case of the Money King	George Hamilton Teed		
Detective Weekly 358	The Brotherhood of Twelve	Norman Goddard		
The Knock-Out Comic 1 (strip)	Sexton Blake and the Hooded Stranger (part 1)	Anon. (Holmes/Walker)		
The Knock-Out Comic 2 (strip)	Sexton Blake and the Hooded Stranger (part 2)	Anon. (Holmes/Walker)		
The Knock-Out Comic 3 (strip)	Sexton Blake and the Hooded Stranger (part 3)	Anon. (Holmes/Walker)		
The Knock-Out Comic 4 (strip)	Sexton Blake and the Hooded Stranger (part 4)	Anon. (Holmes/Walker)		
The Knock-Out Comic 5 (strip)	Sexton Blake and the Hooded Stranger (part 5)	Anon. (Holmes/Walker)		
The Knock-Out Comic 6 (strip)	Sexton Blake and the Hooded Stranger (part 6)	Anon. (Holmes/Walker)		
The Knock-Out Comic 7 (strip)	Sexton Blake and the Hooded Stranger (part 7)	Anon. (Holmes/Walker)		
The Knock-Out Comic 8 (strip)	Sexton Blake and the Hooded Stranger (part 8)	Anon. (Holmes/Walker)		
The Knock-Out Comic 9 (strip)	Sexton Blake and the Hooded Stranger (part 9)	Anon. (Holmes/Walker)		
The Knock-Out Comic 10 (strip)	Sexton Blake and the Hooded Stranger (part 10)	Anon. (Holmes/Walker)		
The Knock-Out Comic 11 (strip)	Sexton Blake and the Hooded Stranger (part 11)	Anon. (Holmes/Walker)		
The Knock-Out Comic 12 (strip)	Sexton Blake and the Hooded Stranger (part 12)	Anon. (Holmes/Walker)		
The Knock-Out Comic 13 (strip)	Sexton Blake and the Hooded Stranger (part 13)	Anon. (Holmes/Walker)		
The Knock-Out Comic 14 (strip)	Sexton Blake and the Hooded Stranger (part 14)	Anon. (Holmes/Walker)		
The Knock-Out Comic 15 (strip)	Sexton Blake and the Hooded Stranger (part 15)	Anon. (Holmes/Walker)		
The Knock-Out Comic 16 (strip)	Sexton Blake and the Hooded Stranger (part 16)	Anon. (Holmes/Walker)		
The Knock-Out Comic 17 (strip)	Sexton Blake and the Hooded Stranger (part 17)	Anon. (Holmes/Walker)		
The Knock-Out Comic 18 (strip)	Sexton Blake and the Hooded Stranger (part 18)	Anon. (Holmes/Walker)		
The Knock-Out Comic 19 (strip)	Sexton Blake and the Hooded Stranger (part 19)	Anon. (Holmes/Walker)		
The Knock-Out Comic 20 (strip)	Sexton Blake and the Hooded Stranger (part 20)	Anon. (Holmes/Walker)		
The Knock-Out Comic 21 (strip)	Sexton Blake and the Hooded Stranger (part 21)	Anon. (Holmes/Walker)		
The Knock-Out Comic 22 (strip)	Sexton Blake and the Hooded Stranger (part 22)	Anon. (Holmes/Walker)		
The Knock-Out Comic 23 (strip)	Sexton Blake and the Hooded Stranger (part 23)	Anon. (Holmes/Walker)		
The Knock-Out Comic 24 (strip)	Sexton Blake and the Hooded Stranger (part 24)	Anon. (Holmes/Walker)		
The Knock-Out Comic 25 (strip)	Sexton Blake and the Hooded Stranger (part 25)	Anon. (Holmes/Walker)		
The Knock-Out Comic 26 (strip)	Sexton Blake and the Hooded Stranger (part 26)	Anon. (Holmes/Walker)		
The Knock-Out Comic 27 (strip)	Sexton Blake and the Hooded Stranger (part 27)	Anon. (Holmes/Walker)		
The Knock-Out Comic 28 (strip)	Sexton Blake and the Hooded Stranger (part 28)	Anon. (Holmes/Walker)		
The Knock-Out Comic 29 (strip)	Sexton Blake and the Hooded Stranger (part 29)	Anon. (Holmes/Walker)		
The Knock-Out Comic 30 (strip)	Sexton Blake and the Hooded Stranger (part 30)	Anon. (Holmes/Walker)		
The Knock-Out Comic 31 (strip)	Sexton Blake and the Hooded Stranger (part 31)	Anon. (Holmes/Walker)		
The Knock-Out Comic 32 (strip)	Sexton Blake and the Hooded Stranger (part 32)	Anon. (Holmes/Walker)		
The Knock-Out Comic 33 (strip)	Sexton Blake and the Hooded Stranger (part 33)	Anon. (Holmes/Walker)		
The Knock-Out Comic 34 (strip)	Sexton Blake and the Hooded Stranger (part 34)	Anon. (Holmes/Walker)		
The Knock-Out Comic 35 (strip)	Sexton Blake and the Hooded Stranger (part 35)	Anon. (Holmes/Walker)		
The Knock-Out Comic 36 (strip)	Sexton Blake and the Hooded Stranger (part 36)	Anon. (Holmes/Walker)		
The Knock-Out Comic 37 (strip)	Sexton Blake and the Hooded Stranger (part 37)	Anon. (Holmes/Walker)		
The Knock-Out Comic 38 (strip)	Sexton Blake and the Hooded Stranger (part 38)	Anon. (Holmes/Walker)		
The Knock-Out Comic 39 (strip)	Sexton Blake and the Hooded Stranger (part 39)	Anon. (Holmes/Walker)		
The Knock-Out Comic 40 (strip)	Sexton Blake and the Hooded Stranger (part 40)	Anon. (Holmes/Walker)		
The Knock-Out Comic 41 (strip)	Sexton Blake and the Hooded Stranger (part 41)	Anon. (Holmes/Walker)		
The Knock-Out Comic 42 (strip)	Sexton Blake On Special Service	Anon. (Clarke/Taylor)		
The Knock-Out Comic 43 (strip)	Sexton Blake On Special Service	Anon. (Clarke/Taylor)		
The Knock-Out Comic 44 (strip)	Sexton Blake On Special Service	Anon. (Clarke/Taylor)		
The Sexton Blake Library (2nd Series) 653	The Third Victim	Donald Stuart		
The Sexton Blake Library (2nd Series) 654	The Mystery of the Condemned Cottage	Gilbert Chester (H. H. C. Gibbons)		
The Sexton Blake Library (2nd Series) 655	The Case of the Kidnapped Prisoner	Allan Blair (William J. Bayfield)		
The Sexton Blake Library (2nd Series) 656	The Fatal Fortune	Andrew Murray		
The Sexton Blake Library (2nd Series) 657	The Mystery of the Green Bottle	J. G. Brandon		
The Sexton Blake Library (2nd Series) 658	The Riddle of Ugly Face	Pierre Quiroule (W. W. Sayer)		
The Sexton Blake Library (2nd Series) 659	The Phantom of the Mill	Lester Bidston		
The Sexton Blake Library (2nd Series) 660	The Case of the Missing Musician	Rex Hardinge		
The Sexton Blake Library (2nd Series) 661	The Great Hush-Hush Mystery	Maurice B. Dix		
The Sexton Blake Library (2nd Series) 662	The Riddle of the Lost Ship	John Hunter		
The Sexton Blake Library (2nd Series) 663	The Night Club Mystery	George Hamilton Teed		
The Sexton Blake Library (2nd Series) 664	Fatal Forgery	J. G. Brandon		
The Sexton Blake Library (2nd Series) 665	The Mystery of the African Farm	Rex Hardinge		
The Sexton Blake Library (2nd Series) 666	The Great Air Swindle ·John Creasey			
The Sexton Blake Library (2nd Series) 667	The Sign of the Black Feather	Hylton Gregory (H. Egbert Hill)		
The Sexton Blake Library (2nd Series) 668	The Monastery Mystery	Gilbert Chester (H. H. C. Gibbons)		
The Sexton Blake Library (2nd Series) 669	The A.R.P. Mystery	Barry Perowne (P. Atkey)		
The Sexton Blake Library (2nd Series) 670	The Man from Singapore	J. G. Brandon		
The Sexton Blake Library (2nd Series) 671	The Harem Mystery	Anthony Parsons		
The Sexton Blake Library (2nd Series) 672	The Riddle of the West-End Hairdresser	Gilbert Chester (H. H. C. Gibbons)		
Plus:				
The Fatal 13th	Donald Stuart			
The Sexton Blake Library (2nd Series) 673	The 13th Code	Warwick Jardine (Francis Warwick)		
The Sexton Blake Library (2nd Series) 674	The Mystery of the Lorry Driver	Paul Urquhart (L. L. Day Black)		
The Sexton Blake Library (2nd Series) 675	The Burmese Dagger	Donald Stuart		
The Sexton Blake Library (2nd Series) 676	The Great Trunk Mystery	Hylton Gregory (H. Egbert Hill)		
The Sexton Blake Library (2nd Series) 677	Murder On the Ice-Rink	J. G. Brandon		
The Sexton Blake Library (2nd Series) 678	The Riddle of the Negro's Head	Coutts Brisbane (R. C. Armour)		
The Sexton Blake Library (2nd Series) 679	The Case of the Stolen Police Dossier	Allan Blair (William J. Bayfield)		
The Sexton Blake Library (2nd Series) 680	The Tour of Terror	Mark Osborne (John W. Bobin)		
The Sexton Blake Library (2nd Series) 681	The Case of the Crook Rajah	Anthony Parsons		
The Sexton Blake Library (2nd Series) 682	In the Hands of Spies	J. G. Brandon		
The Sexton Blake Library (2nd Series) 683	The Impersonators	Edwy Searles Brooks		
The Sexton Blake Library (2nd Series) 684	The Riddle of the Evil Eye	Pierre Quiroule (W. W. Sayer)		
The Sexton Blake Library (2nd Series) 685	The Secret of the Cellar	Walter Edwards (Walter Shute)		
The Sexton Blake Library (2nd Series) 686	The Depository Mystery	Gilbert Chester (H. H. C. Gibbons)		
The Sexton Blake Library (2nd Series) 687	The Case of the Bogus Monk	George Hamilton Teed		
Plus:				
The Innkeeper's Fate		Anon. (unknown)		
The Sexton Blake Library (2nd Series) 688	The Riddle of the Ranch	Warwick Jardine (Francis Warwick)		
The Sexton Blake Library (2nd Series) 689	The Man With Jitters	J. G. Brandon		
The Sexton Blake Library (2nd Series) 690	The Hidden Menace	Donald Stuart		
The Sexton Blake Library (2nd Series) 691	The Mystery of the Missing Envoy	Pierre Quiroule (W. W. Sayer)		
The Sexton Blake Library (2nd Series) 692	The Case of the Rejuvenated Millionaire	Anthony Skene (George N. Philips)		
The Sexton Blake Library (2nd Series) 693	The Rubber Smugglers	George Hamilton Teed		
The Sexton Blake Library (2nd Series) 694	The Secret of the Golden Horse	Anthony Parsons		
The Sexton Blake Library (2nd Series) 695	The Mystery of the Missing Refugee	Hedley Scott		
The Sexton Blake Library (2nd Series) 696	The Gunboat Mystery	J. G. Brandon		
The Sexton Blake Library (2nd Series) 697	The Secret of the Surgery	Warwick Jardine (Francis Warwick)		
The Sexton Blake Library (2nd Series) 698	The Police Station Mystery	Rex Hardinge		
The Sexton Blake Library (2nd Series) 699	The Great Taxi-Cab Ramp	J. G. Brandon		
The Sexton Blake Library (2nd Series) 700	The Fur Raiders	Gilbert Chester (H. H. C. Gibbons)		
Plus:				
The Case of the Rancher Earl		Anon. (Unknown)		
The Thriller 525	The Trail of the Missing Million (part 4)		Anon. (Edward Holmes)	
The Thriller 526	The Trail of the Missing Million (part 5)		Anon. (Edward Holmes)	
The Thriller 527	The Trail of the Missing Million (part 6)		Anon. (Edward Holmes)	
The Thriller 528	The Trail of the Missing Million (part 7)		Anon. (Edward Holmes)	
The Thriller 529	The Trail of the Missing Million (part 8)		Anon. (Edward Holmes)	
Wild West 48	The Trail of the Missing Million (part 1)		Anon. (Edward Holmes)	
Wild West 49	The Trail of the Missing Million (part 2)		Anon. (Edward Holmes)	
Wild West 50	The Trail of the Missing Million (part 3)		Anon. (Edward Holmes)	

== 1940 ==
Publication	Title	Author	Key Characters	Notes
Sexton Blake Annual 2	The One Who Knew; Zenith the Albino; The Tartan Box; The Falcon of Fambridge; The Affair of Dingley Dell; The Man I Killed; Sexton Blake – Detective; The Man From Scotland Yard	Anon. (Unknown); Anthony Skene (George N. Philips); George Hamilton Teed; Anthony Skene (George N. Philips); Anon. (Unknown); Rex Hardinge; Harold Blyth (Hal Meredeth); Anon. (E. Sempill aka M. Storm)	Anthology	
Detective Weekly 359	The Adventure of the Stolen Promoter	Anon. (Stanley Hooper)		
Detective Weekly 360	The Council of Eleven	George Hamilton Teed		
Detective Weekly 361	The Man in Black	Anon. (Edward Holmes)		
Detective Weekly 362	The Case of the Secret Courier	George Hamilton Teed		
Detective Weekly 363	The Clue of the Crimson Needle	Andrew Murray		
Detective Weekly 364	The Problem of the Yellow Button	E. Sempill aka M. Storm		
Detective Weekly 365	The Case of the Coniston Diamonds	George Hamilton Teed		
Detective Weekly 366	The Vengeance of Yvonne	George Hamilton Teed		
Detective Weekly 367	The Brotherhood of the Beetle	George Hamilton Teed		
Detective Weekly 368	The Riddle of Room 11	E. Sempill aka M. Storm		
Detective Weekly 369	The Mystery Millionaire	William J. Bayfield		
Detective Weekly 370	Murder by Proxy	Andrew Murray		
Detective Weekly 371	A Riddle in Red Leather	George Hamilton Teed		
Plus:				
		Anon. (Edward Holmes)		
Detective Weekly 372	The Case of the Grey Envelope	Anthony Skene (George N. Philips)		
Plus:				
A Case for Sexton Blake (part 2)		Anon. (Edward Holmes)		
Detective Weekly 373	The Man Who Made Gold	Coutts Brisbane (R. C. Armour)		
Plus:				
A Case for Sexton Blake (part 3)		Anon. (Edward Holmes)		
Detective Weekly 374	Mystery Wears a Wig	William J. Bayfield		
Plus:				
A Case for Sexton Blake (part 4)	Anon. (Edward Holmes)			
Detective Weekly 375	The Seven Blue Bombers	Stanley Hooper		
Detective Weekly 376	The Pit of Doom	Unknown		
Detective Weekly 377	The Case of the Cataleptic	Jack Lewis		
Detective Weekly 378	The Leopard of Droon	Edwy Searles Brooks		
Detective Weekly 379	The Secret of the Loch	Stanley Hooper		
The Knock-Out Comic 45 (strip)	Sexton Blake On Special Service	Anon. (Clarke/Taylor)		
The Knock-Out Comic 46 (strip)	Sexton Blake On Special Service	Anon. (Clarke/Taylor)		
The Knock-Out Comic 47 (strip)	Sexton Blake On Special Service	Anon. (Clarke/Taylor)		
The Knock-Out Comic 48 (strip)	Sexton Blake On Special Service	Anon. (Clarke/Taylor)		
The Knock-Out Comic 49 (strip)	Sexton Blake On Special Service	Anon. (Clarke/Taylor)		
The Knock-Out Comic 50 (strip)	Sexton Blake On Special Service	Anon. (Clarke/Taylor)		
The Knock-Out Comic 51 (strip)	Sexton Blake On Special Service	Anon. (Clarke/Taylor)		
The Knock-Out Comic 52 (strip)	Sexton Blake On Special Service	Anon. (Clarke/Taylor)		
Knock-Out Comic 53 (strip)	Sexton Blake On Special Service	Anon. (Clarke/Taylor)		
Knock-Out Comic 54 (strip)	Sexton Blake On Special Service	Anon. (Clarke/Taylor)		
Knock-Out Comic 55 (strip)	Sexton Blake On Special Service	Anon. (Clarke/Taylor)		
Knock-Out Comic 56 (strip)	Sexton Blake On Special Service	Anon. (Clarke/Taylor)		
Knock-Out Comic 57 (strip)	Sexton Blake On Special Service	Anon. (Clarke/Taylor)		
Knock-Out Comic 58 (strip)	Sexton Blake On Special Service	Anon. (Clarke/Taylor)		
Knock-Out Comic 59 (strip)	Sexton Blake On Special Service	Anon. (Clarke/Taylor)		
Knock-Out Comic 60 (strip)	Sexton Blake On Special Service	Anon. (Clarke/Taylor)		
Knock-Out Comic 61 (strip)	Sexton Blake On Special Service	Anon. (Clarke/Taylor)		
Knock-Out Comic 62 (strip)	Sexton Blake On Special Service	Anon. (Clarke/Taylor)		
Knock-Out Comic 63 (strip)	Sexton Blake On Special Service	Anon. (Clarke/Taylor)		
Knock-Out Comic 64 (strip)	Sexton Blake On Special Service	Anon. (Clarke/Taylor)		
Knock-Out Comic 65 (strip)	Sexton Blake On Special Service	Anon. (Clarke/Taylor)		
Knock-Out Comic 66 (strip)	Sexton Blake On Special Service	Anon. (Clarke/Taylor)		
Knock-Out Comic 67 (strip)	Sexton Blake On Special Service	Anon. (Clarke/Taylor)		
Knock-Out Comic 68 (strip)	Sexton Blake On Special Service	Anon. (Clarke/Taylor)		
Knock-Out Comic 69 (strip)	Sexton Blake On Special Service	Anon. (Clarke/Taylor)		
Knock-Out Comic 70 (strip)	Sexton Blake On Special Service	Anon. (Clarke/Taylor)		
Knock-Out Comic 71 (strip)	Sexton Blake On Special Service	Anon. (Clarke/Taylor)		
Knock-Out Comic 72 (strip)	Sexton Blake On Special Service	Anon. (Clarke/Taylor)		
Knock-Out Comic 73 (strip)	Sexton Blake On Special Service	Anon. (Clarke/Taylor)		
Knock-Out Comic 74 (strip)	Sexton Blake On Special Service	Anon. (Clarke/Taylor)		
Knock-Out Comic 75 (strip)	Sexton Blake On Special Service	Anon. (Clarke/Taylor)		
Knock-Out Comic 76 (strip)	Sexton Blake On Special Service	Anon. (Clarke/Taylor)		
Knock-Out Comic 77 (strip)	Sexton Blake On Special Service	Anon. (Clarke/Taylor)		
Knock-Out Comic 78 (strip)	Sexton Blake On Special Service	Anon. (Clarke/Taylor)		
Knock-Out Comic 79 (strip)	Sexton Blake On Special Service	Anon. (Clarke/Taylor)		
Knock-Out Comic 80 (strip)	Sexton Blake On Special Service	Anon. (Clarke/Taylor)		
Knock-Out Comic 81 (strip)	Sexton Blake On Special Service	Anon. (Clarke/Taylor)		
Knock-Out Comic 82 (strip)	Sexton Blake On Special Service	Anon. (Clarke/Taylor)		
Knock-Out Comic 83 (strip)	Sexton Blake On Special Service	Anon. (Clarke/Taylor)		
Knock-Out Comic 84 (strip)	Sexton Blake On Special Service	Anon. (Clarke/Taylor)		
Knock-Out Comic 85 (strip)	Sexton Blake On Special Service	Anon. (Clarke/Taylor)		
Knock-Out Comic 86 (strip)	Sexton Blake On Special Service	Anon. (Clarke/Taylor)		
Knock-Out Comic 87 (strip)	Sexton Blake On Special Service	Anon. (Clarke/Taylor)		
Knock-Out Comic 88 (strip)	Sexton Blake On Special Service	Anon. (Clarke/Taylor)		
Knock-Out Comic 89 (strip)	Sexton Blake On Special Service	Anon. (Clarke/Taylor)		
Knock-Out Comic 90 (strip)	Sexton Blake On Special Service	Anon. (Clarke/Taylor)		
Knock-Out Comic 91 (strip)	Sexton Blake On Special Service	Anon. (Clarke/Taylor)		
Knock-Out Comic 92 (strip)	Sexton Blake On Special Service	Anon. (Clarke/Taylor)		
Knock-Out Comic 93 (strip)	Sexton Blake On Special Service	Anon. (Clarke/Taylor)		
Knock-Out Comic 94 (strip)	Sexton Blake On Special Service	Anon. (Clarke/Taylor)		
Knock-Out Comic 95 (strip)	Sexton Blake On Special Service	Anon. (Clarke/Taylor)		
Knock-Out Comic 96 (strip)	Sexton Blake On Special Service	Anon. (Clarke/Taylor)		
The Sexton Blake Library (2nd Series) 701	The Mystery Militiaman	Ladbroke Black		
The Sexton Blake Library (2nd Series) 702	The Great Stores Mystery	Walter Edwards (Walter Shute)		
The Sexton Blake Library (2nd Series) 703	The Case of the Shot P.C.	Anthony Skene (George N. Philips)		
The Sexton Blake Library (2nd Series) 704	The Secret of the Sacred Ruby	Hylton Gregory (H. Egbert Hill)		
The Sexton Blake Library (2nd Series) 705	The Terror of the Pacific	J. G. Brandon		
The Sexton Blake Library (2nd Series) 706	The Riddle of the Gas Meter	Gilbert Chester (H. H. C. Gibbons)		
The Sexton Blake Library (2nd Series) 707	The Mystery of Gold Digger Creek	George Hamilton Teed		
The Sexton Blake Library (2nd Series) 708	The Secret of the Hulk	Donald Stuart		
The Sexton Blake Library (2nd Series) 709	The Black Swastika	J. G. Brandon		
The Sexton Blake Library (2nd Series) 710	The Secret of Oil Creek	Anthony Parsons		
The Sexton Blake Library (2nd Series) 711	Sexton Blake, Special Constable	Mark Osborne (John W. Bobin)		
The Sexton Blake Library (2nd Series) 712	The Man from the Jungle	Rex Hardinge		
The Sexton Blake Library (2nd Series) 713	In the Grip of the Gestapo	Stanton Hope		
The Sexton Blake Library (2nd Series) 714	The Mystery of Sherwood Towers	Donald Stuart		
The Sexton Blake Library (2nd Series) 715	The Case of the Dictator's Double	Allan Blair (William J. Bayfield)		
The Sexton Blake Library (2nd Series) 716	The Riddle of the Murdered Fisherman	Gilbert Chester (H. H. C. Gibbons)		
The Sexton Blake Library (2nd Series) 717	The Secret of the Siegfried Line	Maurice B. Dix		
The Sexton Blake Library (2nd Series) 718	The Eighth Millionaire	George Hamilton Teed		
The Sexton Blake Library (2nd Series) 719	The Mystery of the Red Tower	Coutts Brisbane (R. C. Armour)		
The Sexton Blake Library (2nd Series) 720	Crook's Cargo	J. G. Brandon		
The Sexton Blake Library (2nd Series) 721	The Black-Out Crime	Gilbert Chester (H. H. C. Gibbons)		
The Sexton Blake Library (2nd Series) 722	The Man from China	Anthony Parsons		
The Sexton Blake Library (2nd Series) 723	The Case of the Crimson Conjuror	Gwyn Evans		
The Sexton Blake Library (2nd Series) 724	The Riddle of the Greek Financier	J. G. Brandon		
The Sexton Blake Library (2nd Series) 725	The Mystery of the German Prisoner	Martin Frazer (Percy A. Clarke)		
The Sexton Blake Library (2nd Series) 726	The Consulting Room Mystery	Mark Osborne (John W. Bobin)		
The Sexton Blake Library (2nd Series) 727	On Ticket of Leave	J. G. Brandon		
The Sexton Blake Library (2nd Series) 728	The Case of the Jack of Clubs	W. J. Bayfield		
The Sexton Blake Library (2nd Series) 729	The Case of the Missing Major	Anthony Parsons		
The Sexton Blake Library (2nd Series) 730	The Mysterious Mr. Maynard	John Hunter		
The Sexton Blake Library (2nd Series) 731	The Secret of the Evacuee	Paul Urquhart (L. L. Day Black)		
The Sexton Blake Library (2nd Series) 732	Twenty Years of Hate	Donald Stuart		
The Sexton Blake Library (2nd Series) 733	The Observer Corps Mystery	Rex Hardinge		
The Sexton Blake Library (2nd Series) 734	The Riddle of Dead Man's Bay	J. G. Brandon		

== 1941 ==
Publication	Title	Author	Key Characters	Notes
Sexton Blake Annual 3	The Riddle of the Cross; The Case of the Wandering Jew; The Secret of the Hold; The Clue of the Cracked Footprint; The Mystery of the Haunted Trail; The Case of the Lost Lobangu; The Secret Amulet; The Spanish Circle Conspiracy; The Lumberjack's Crime; The Ship With Two Masters	Anon. (Unknown); Anon. (Unknown); Anon. (Unknown); Anon. (Unknown); Anon. (Unknown); Anon. (Unknown); Anthony Parsons; Anon. (Unknown); Anon. (Unknown); Anon. (Unknown)		Anthology
Knock-Out Comic 97 (strip)	Sexton Blake On Special Service	Anon. (Clarke/Taylor)		
Knock-Out Comic 98 (strip)	Sexton Blake On Special Service	Anon. (Clarke/Taylor)		
Knock-Out Comic 99 (strip)	Sexton Blake On Special Service	Anon. (Clarke/Taylor)		
Knock-Out Comic 100 (strip)	Sexton Blake On Special Service	Anon. (Clarke/Taylor)		
Knock-Out Comic 101 (strip)	Sexton Blake On Special Service	Anon. (Clarke/Taylor)		
Knock-Out Comic 102 (strip)	Sexton Blake On Special Service	Anon. (Clarke/Taylor)		
Knock-Out Comic 103 (strip)	Sexton Blake On Special Service	Anon. (Clarke/Taylor)		
Knock-Out Comic 104 (strip)	Sexton Blake On Special Service	Anon. (Clarke/Taylor)		
Knock-Out Comic 105 (strip)	Sexton Blake On Special Service	Anon. (Clarke/Taylor)		
Knock-Out Comic 106 (strip)	Sexton Blake On Special Service	Anon. (Clarke/Taylor)		
Knock-Out Comic 107 (strip)	Sexton Blake On Special Service	Anon. (Clarke/Taylor)		
Knock-Out Comic 108 (strip)	Sexton Blake On Special Service	Anon. (Clarke/Taylor)		
Knock-Out Comic 109 (strip)	Sexton Blake On Special Service	Anon. (Clarke/Taylor)		
Knock-Out Comic 110 (strip)	Sexton Blake On Special Service	Anon. (Clarke/Taylor)		
Knock-Out Comic 111 (strip)	Sexton Blake On Special Service	Anon. (Clarke/Taylor)		
Knock-Out Comic 112 (strip)	Sexton Blake On Special Service	Anon. (Clarke/Taylor)		
Knock-Out Comic 113 (strip)	Sexton Blake On Special Service	Anon. (Clarke/Taylor)		
Knock-Out Comic 114 (strip)	Sexton Blake On Special Service	Anon. (Clarke/Taylor)		
Knock-Out Comic 115 (strip)	Sexton Blake On Special Service	Anon. (Clarke/Taylor)		
Knock-Out Comic 116 (strip)	Sexton Blake On Special Service	Anon. (Clarke/Taylor)		
Knock-Out Comic 117 (strip)	Sexton Blake On Special Service	Anon. (Clarke/Taylor)		
Knock-Out Comic 118 (strip)	Sexton Blake On Special Service	Anon. (Clarke/Taylor)		
Knock-Out Comic 119 (strip)	Sexton Blake On Special Service	Anon. (Clarke/Taylor)		
Knock-Out Comic 120 (strip)	Sexton Blake On Special Service	Anon. (Clarke/Taylor)		
Knock-Out Comic 121 (strip)	Sexton Blake On Special Service	Anon. (Clarke/Taylor)		
Knock-Out Comic 122 (strip)	Sexton Blake On Special Service	Anon. (Clarke/Taylor)		
Knock-Out Comic 123 (strip)	Sexton Blake On Special Service	Anon. (Clarke/Taylor)		
Knock-Out Comic 124 (strip)	Sexton Blake On Special Service	Anon. (Clarke/Taylor)		
Knock-Out Comic 125 (strip)	Sexton Blake On Special Service	Anon. (Clarke/Taylor)		
Knock-Out Comic 126 (strip)	Sexton Blake On Special Service	Anon. (Clarke/Taylor)		
Knock-Out Comic 127 (strip)	Sexton Blake On Special Service	Anon. (Clarke/Taylor)		
Knock-Out Comic 128 (strip)	Sexton Blake On Special Service	Anon. (Clarke/Taylor)		
Knock-Out Comic 129 (strip)	Sexton Blake On Special Service	Anon. (Clarke/Taylor)		
Knock-Out Comic 130 (strip)	Sexton Blake On Special Service	Anon. (Clarke/Taylor)		
Knock-Out Comic 131 (strip)	Sexton Blake On Special Service	Anon. (Clarke/Taylor)		
Knock-Out Comic 132 (strip)	Sexton Blake On Special Service	Anon. (Clarke/Taylor)		
Knock-Out Comic 133 (strip)	Sexton Blake On Special Service	Anon. (Clarke/Taylor)		
Knock-Out Comic 134 (strip)	Sexton Blake On Special Service	Anon. (Clarke/Taylor)		
Knock-Out Comic 135 (strip)	Sexton Blake On Special Service	Anon. (Clarke/Taylor)		
Knock-Out Comic 136 (strip)	Sexton Blake On Special Service	Anon. (Clarke/Taylor)		
Knock-Out Comic 137 (strip)	Sexton Blake On Special Service	Anon. (Clarke/Taylor)		
Knock-Out Comic 138 (strip)	Sexton Blake On Special Service	Anon. (Clarke/Taylor)		
Knock-Out Comic 139 (strip)	Sexton Blake On Special Service	Anon. (Clarke/Taylor)		
Knock-Out Comic 140 (strip)	Sexton Blake On Special Service	Anon. (Clarke/Taylor)		
Knock-Out Comic 141 (strip)	Sexton Blake On Special Service	Anon. (Clarke/Taylor)		
Knock-Out Comic 145 (strip)	Sexton Blake On Special Service	Anon. (Clarke/Taylor)		
Knock-Out Comic 146 (strip)	Sexton Blake On Special Service	Anon. (Clarke/Taylor)		
Knock-Out Comic 147 (strip)	Sexton Blake On Special Service	Anon. (Clarke/Taylor)		
Knock-Out Comic 148 (strip)	Sexton Blake On Special Service	Anon. (Clarke/Taylor)		
Knock-Out Fun Book 1941	Sexton Blake and the High Speed Pirates	Anon. (Unknown/Taylor)		
The Sexton Blake Library (2nd Series) 735	The Case of the Murdered Caretaker	Clifford Gates		
The Sexton Blake Library (2nd Series) 736	The Amazing Affair of the Shipyard Sabotage	Stanton Hope		
The Sexton Blake Library (2nd Series) 737	The Man from Fleet Street ·John Creasey			
The Sexton Blake Library (2nd Series) 738	The Riddle of the Yukon	L. C. Douthwaite		
The Sexton Blake Library (2nd Series) 739	Under Secret Orders	J. G. Brandon		
The Sexton Blake Library (2nd Series) 740	Doomed Men	Warwick Jardine (Francis Warwick)		
The Sexton Blake Library (2nd Series) 741	The Mystery of the Free Frenchmen	Anthony Parsons		
The Sexton Blake Library (2nd Series) 742	The House of Darkness	John Hunter		
The Sexton Blake Library (2nd Series) 743	The Case of the Man On Leave	Gilbert Chester (H. H. C. Gibbons)		
The Sexton Blake Library (2nd Series) 744	In the Night-Watch	Edwy Searles Brooks		
The Sexton Blake Library (3rd Series) 1	Raiders Passed	John Hunter		
The Sexton Blake Library (3rd Series) 2	On the Stroke of Nine	Anthony Parsons		
The Sexton Blake Library (3rd Series) 3	The Mystery of the Hush-Hush Factory	Gilbert Chester (H. H. C. Gibbons)		
The Sexton Blake Library (3rd Series) 4	The Red Stiletto	Anthony Skene (George N. Philips)		
The Sexton Blake Library (3rd Series) 5	The Case of the Shot Looter	Martin Frazer (Percy A. Clarke)		
The Sexton Blake Library (3rd Series) 6	The Riddle of the Body on the Road	Edwy Searles Brooks		
The Sexton Blake Library (3rd Series) 7	The Crime of Corporal Sherwood	Gilbert Chester (H. H. C. Gibbons)		
The Sexton Blake Library (3rd Series) 8	The Man from Occupied France	Anthony Parsons		
The Sexton Blake Library (3rd Series) 9	The Secret of the Grave	John Hunter		
The Sexton Blake Library (3rd Series) 10	The Case of the Mystery Parachutist br> Plus: The Haunted Hotel Mystery	Hylton Gregory (H. Egbert Hill); Anthony Skene (George N. Philips)		
The Sexton Blake Library (3rd Series) 11	The Riddle of the Missing Fire-Watcher	Gilbert Chester (H. H. C. Gibbons)		
The Sexton Blake Library (3rd Series) 12	The Clue of the Stolen Rupees	Anthony Parsons		
The Sexton Blake Library (3rd Series) 13	One of Seven	Rex Hardinge		
The Sexton Blake Library (3rd Series) 14	The Man From Norway	Gilbert Chester (H. H. C. Gibbons)		

== 1942 ==
Publication	Title	Author	Key Characters	Notes
Sexton Blake Annual 4	Under Sexton Blake's Orders; The Clue of the Crimson Snow; The Riddle of O.C. Balloon Barrage; The Secret of the Slums; The Mystery of Mardale Pit; The Case of the Seventh Key; The Man Who Was Hammered; Sinister Cliff; The Ghost That Didn't Walk; The House of the Hanging Sword	Donald Stuart; George Hamilton Teed; Rex Hardinge; Gwyn Evans; Anon. (Unknown)	Anthology	
Knock-Out Comic 149 (strip)	Sexton Blake On Special Service	Anon. (Clarke/Taylor)		
Knock-Out Comic 150 (strip)	Sexton Blake On Special Service	Anon. (Clarke/Taylor)		
Knock-Out Comic 151 (strip)	Sexton Blake On Special Service	Anon. (Clarke/Taylor)		
Knock-Out Comic 152 (strip)	Sexton Blake On Special Service	Anon. (Clarke/Taylor)		
Knock-Out Comic 153 (strip)	Sexton Blake On Special Service	Anon. (Clarke/Taylor)		
Knock-Out Comic 154 (strip)	Sexton Blake On Special Service	Anon. (Clarke/Taylor)		
Knock-Out Comic 155 (strip)	Sexton Blake On Special Service	Anon. (Clarke/Taylor)		
Knock-Out Comic 156 (strip)	Sexton Blake On Special Service	Anon. (Clarke/Taylor)		
Knock-Out Comic 157 (strip)	Sexton Blake On Special Service	Anon. (Clarke/Taylor)		
Knock-Out Comic 158 (strip)	Sexton Blake On Special Service	Anon. (Clarke/Taylor)		
Knock-Out Comic 159 (strip)	Sexton Blake On Special Service	Anon. (Clarke/Taylor)		
Knock-Out Comic 160 (strip)	Sexton Blake On Special Service	Anon. (Clarke/Taylor)		
Knock-Out Comic 161 (strip)	Sexton Blake On Special Service	Anon. (Clarke/Taylor)		
Knock-Out Comic 162 (strip)	Sexton Blake On Special Service	Anon. (Clarke/Taylor)		
Knock-Out Comic 163 (strip)	Sexton Blake On Special Service	Anon. (Clarke/Taylor)		
Knock-Out Comic 164 (strip)	Sexton Blake On Special Service	Anon. (Clarke/Taylor)		
Knock-Out Comic 165 (strip)	Sexton Blake On Special Service	Anon. (Clarke/Taylor)		
Knock-Out Comic 166 (strip)	Sexton Blake On Special Service	Anon. (Clarke/Taylor)		
Knock-Out Comic 167 (strip)	Sexton Blake On Special Service	Anon. (Clarke/Taylor)		
Knock-Out Comic 168 (strip)	Sexton Blake On Special Service	Anon. (Clarke/Taylor)		
Knock-Out Comic 169 (strip)	Sexton Blake On Special Service	Anon. (Clarke/Taylor)		
Knock-Out Comic 170 (strip)	Sexton Blake On Special Service	Anon. (Clarke/Taylor)		
Knock-Out Comic 171 (strip)	Sexton Blake On Special Service	Anon. (Clarke/Taylor)		
Knock-Out Comic 172 (strip)	Sexton Blake On Special Service	Anon. (Clarke/Taylor)		
Knock-Out Comic 173 (strip)	Sexton Blake On Special Service	Anon. (Clarke/Taylor)		
Knock-Out Comic 174 (strip)	Sexton Blake On Special Service	Anon. (Clarke/Taylor)		
Knock-Out Comic 175 (strip)	Sexton Blake On Special Service	Anon. (Clarke/Taylor)		
Knock-Out Comic 176 (strip)	Sexton Blake On Special Service	Anon. (Clarke/Taylor)		
Knock-Out Comic 177 (strip)	Sexton Blake On Special Service	Anon. (Clarke/Taylor)		
Knock-Out Comic 178 (strip)	Sexton Blake On Special Service	Anon. (Clarke/Taylor)		
Knock-Out Comic 179 (strip)	Sexton Blake On Special Service	Anon. (Clarke/Taylor)		
Knock-Out Comic 180 (strip)	Sexton Blake On Special Service	Anon. (Clarke/Taylor)		
Knock-Out Comic 181 (strip)	Sexton Blake On Special Service	Anon. (Clarke/Taylor)		
Knock-Out Comic 182 (strip)	Sexton Blake On Special Service	Anon. (Clarke/Taylor)		
Knock-Out Comic 183 (strip)	Sexton Blake On Special Service	Anon. (Clarke/Taylor)		
Knock-Out Comic 184 (strip)	Sexton Blake On Special Service	Anon. (Clarke/Taylor)		
Knock-Out Comic 185 (strip)	Sexton Blake On Special Service	Anon. (Clarke/Taylor)		
Knock-Out Comic 186 (strip)	Sexton Blake On Special Service	Anon. (Clarke/Taylor)		
Knock-Out Comic 187 (strip)	Sexton Blake On Special Service	Anon. (Clarke/Taylor)		
Knock-Out Comic 188 (strip)	Sexton Blake On Special Service	Anon. (Clarke/Taylor)		
Knock-Out Comic 189 (strip)	Sexton Blake On Special Service	Anon. (Clarke/Taylor)		
Knock-Out Comic 190 (strip)	Sexton Blake On Special Service	Anon. (Clarke/Taylor)		
Knock-Out Comic 191 (strip)	Sexton Blake On Special Service	Anon. (Clarke/Taylor)		
Knock-Out Comic 192 (strip)	Sexton Blake On Special Service	Anon. (Clarke/Taylor)		
Knock-Out Comic 193 (strip)	Sexton Blake On Special Service	Anon. (Clarke/Taylor)		
Knock-Out Comic 194 (strip)	Sexton Blake On Special Service	Anon. (Clarke/Taylor)		
Knock-Out Comic 195 (strip)	Sexton Blake On Special Service	Anon. (Clarke/Taylor)		
Knock-Out Comic 196 (strip)	Sexton Blake On Special Service	Anon. (Clarke/Taylor)		
Knock-Out Comic 197 (strip)	Sexton Blake On Special Service	Anon. (Clarke/Taylor)		
Knock-Out Comic 198 (strip)	Sexton Blake On Special Service	Anon. (Clarke/Taylor)		
Knock-Out Comic 199 (strip)	Sexton Blake On Special Service	Anon. (Clarke/Taylor)		
Knock-Out Comic 200 (strip)	Sexton Blake On Special Service	Anon. (Clarke/Taylor)		
Knock-Out Fun Book 1942	Sexton Blake and the Sunken Gold	Anon. (Unknown/Walker)		
The Sexton Blake Library (3rd Series) 15	The Case of the French Raiders	John Hunter		
The Sexton Blake Library (3rd Series) 16	The House with Steel Shutters	Anthony Parsons		
The Sexton Blake Library (3rd Series) 17	The Case of the Mad Inventor ·John Creasey			
The Sexton Blake Library (3rd Series) 18	The Riddle of the Uncensored Letter	John Hunter		
The Sexton Blake Library (3rd Series) 19	The Case of the Stolen Dispatches	Anthony Parsons		
The Sexton Blake Library (3rd Series) 20	The Man Who Baled Out	Gilbert Chester (H. H. C. Gibbons)		
The Sexton Blake Library (3rd Series) 21	The Sign of the Blue Triangle	Stanton Hope		
The Sexton Blake Library (3rd Series) 22	The Mystery of the Bombed Hotel	Anthony Skene (George N. Philips)		
The Sexton Blake Library (3rd Series) 23	The Silk-Stocking Murder	Gilbert Chester (H. H. C. Gibbons)		
The Sexton Blake Library (3rd Series) 24	The Stowaway of the S.S. Wanderer	Anthony Parsons		
The Sexton Blake Library (3rd Series) 25	The Case of the Missing Stoker	Lewis Jackson (Jack Lewis)		
The Sexton Blake Library (3rd Series) 26	The Fatal V Sign	Martin Frazer (Percy A. Clarke)		
The Sexton Blake Library (3rd Series) 27	The Riddle of the Black Racketeers	John Hunter		
The Sexton Blake Library (3rd Series) 28	The Secret of the Burma Road	Anthony Parsons		
The Sexton Blake Library (3rd Series) 29	The Cornish Coast Conspiracy	D. L. Ames		
The Sexton Blake Library (3rd Series) 30	The Paper Salvage Crime	Gilbert Chester (H. H. C. Gibbons)		
The Sexton Blake Library (3rd Series) 31	The Secret of the Demolition Worker	John Hunter		
The Sexton Blake Library (3rd Series) 32	The Plot of the Yellow Emperor	Anthony Parsons		
The Sexton Blake Library (3rd Series) 33	The Case of John Muir of the Merchant Navy	Lewis Jackson (Jack Lewis)		
The Sexton Blake Library (3rd Series) 34	The Mystery of the Underground Factory	Gilbert Chester (H. H. C. Gibbons)		
The Sexton Blake Library (3rd Series) 35	The Mystery of the American Envoy	John Hunter		
The Sexton Blake Library (3rd Series) 36	The Riddle of the Captured Quisling	Anthony Parsons		
The Sexton Blake Library (3rd Series) 37	The Victim of the Combine	Gilbert Chester (H. H. C. Gibbons)		
The Sexton Blake Library (3rd Series) 38	The Case of the Bronze Statue	John Hunter		

== 1943 ==
Publication	Title	Author	Key Characters	Notes
Knock-Out Comic 201 (strip)	Sexton Blake On Special Service	Anon. (Clarke/Taylor)		
Knock-Out Comic 202 (strip)	Sexton Blake On Special Service	Anon. (Clarke/Taylor)		
Knock-Out Comic 203 (strip)	Sexton Blake On Special Service	Anon. (Clarke/Taylor)		
Knock-Out Comic 204 (strip)	Sexton Blake On Special Service	Anon. (Clarke/Taylor)		
Knock-Out Comic 205 (strip)	Sexton Blake On Special Service	Anon. (Clarke/Taylor)		
Knock-Out Comic 206 (strip)	Sexton Blake On Special Service	Anon. (Clarke/Taylor)		
Knock-Out Comic 207 (strip)	Sexton Blake On Special Service	Anon. (Clarke/Taylor)		
Knock-Out Comic 208 (strip)	Sexton Blake On Special Service	Anon. (Clarke/Taylor)		
Knock-Out Comic 209 (strip)	Sexton Blake On Special Service	Anon. (Clarke/Taylor)		
Knock-Out Comic 210 (strip)	Sexton Blake On Special Service	Anon. (Clarke/Taylor)		
Knock-Out Comic 211 (strip)	Sexton Blake On Special Service	Anon. (Clarke/Taylor)		
Knock-Out Comic 212 (strip)	Sexton Blake On Special Service	Anon. (Clarke/Taylor)		
Knock-Out Comic 213 (strip)	Sexton Blake On Special Service	Anon. (Clarke/Taylor)		
Knock-Out Comic 214 (strip)	Sexton Blake On Special Service	Anon. (Clarke/Taylor)		
Knock-Out Comic 215 (strip)	Sexton Blake On Special Service	Anon. (Clarke/Taylor)		
Knock-Out Comic 216 (strip)	Sexton Blake On Special Service	Anon. (Clarke/Taylor)		
Knock-Out Comic 217 (strip)	Sexton Blake On Special Service	Anon. (Clarke/Taylor)		
Knock-Out Comic 218 (strip)	Sexton Blake On Special Service	Anon. (Clarke/Taylor)		
Knock-Out Comic 219 (strip)	Sexton Blake On Special Service	Anon. (Clarke/Taylor)		
Knock-Out Comic 220 (strip)	Sexton Blake On Special Service	Anon. (Clarke/Taylor)		
Knock-Out Comic 221 (strip)	Sexton Blake On Special Service	Anon. (Clarke/Taylor)		
Knock-Out Comic 222 (strip)	Sexton Blake On Special Service	Anon. (Clarke/Taylor)		
Knock-Out Comic 223 (strip)	Sexton Blake On Special Service	Anon. (Clarke/Taylor)		
Knock-Out Comic 224 (strip)	Sexton Blake On Special Service	Anon. (Clarke/Taylor)		
Knock-Out Comic 225 (strip)	Sexton Blake On Special Service	Anon. (Clarke/Taylor)		
Knock-Out Comic 226 (strip)	Sexton Blake On Special Service	Anon. (Clarke/Taylor)		
Knock-Out Comic 227 (strip)	Sexton Blake On Special Service	Anon. (Clarke/Taylor)		
Knock-Out Comic 228 (strip)	Sexton Blake On Special Service	Anon. (Clarke/Taylor)		
Knock-Out Comic 229 (strip)	Sexton Blake On Special Service	Anon. (Clarke/Taylor)		
Knock-Out Comic 230 (strip)	Sexton Blake On Special Service	Anon. (Clarke/Taylor)		
Knock-Out Comic 231 (strip)	Sexton Blake On Special Service	Anon. (Clarke/Taylor)		
Knock-Out Comic 232 (strip)	Sexton Blake On Special Service	Anon. (Clarke/Taylor)		
Knock-Out Comic 233 (strip)	Sexton Blake On Special Service	Anon. (Clarke/Taylor)		
Knock-Out Comic 234 (strip)	Sexton Blake On Special Service	Anon. (Clarke/Taylor)		
Knock-Out Comic 235 (strip)	Sexton Blake On Special Service	Anon. (Clarke/Taylor)		
Knock-Out Comic 236 (strip)	Sexton Blake On Special Service	Anon. (Clarke/Taylor)		
Knock-Out Comic 237 (strip)	Sexton Blake On Special Service	Anon. (Clarke/Taylor)		
Knock-Out Comic 238 (strip)	Sexton Blake On Special Service	Anon. (Clarke/Taylor)		
Knock-Out Comic 239 (strip)	Sexton Blake On Special Service	Anon. (Clarke/Taylor)		
Knock-Out Comic 240 (strip)	Sexton Blake On Special Service	Anon. (Clarke/Taylor)		
Knock-Out Comic 241 (strip)	Sexton Blake On Special Service	Anon. (Clarke/Taylor)		
Knock-Out Comic 242 (strip)	Sexton Blake On Special Service	Anon. (Clarke/Taylor)		
Knock-Out Comic 243 (strip)	Sexton Blake On Special Service	Anon. (Clarke/Taylor)		
Knock-Out Comic 244 (strip)	Sexton Blake On Special Service	Anon. (Clarke/Taylor)		
Knock-Out Comic 245 (strip)	Sexton Blake On Special Service	Anon. (Clarke/Taylor)		
Knock-Out Comic 246 (strip)	Sexton Blake On Special Service	Anon. (Clarke/Taylor)		
Knock-Out Comic 247 (strip)	Sexton Blake On Special Service	Anon. (Clarke/Taylor)		
Knock-Out Comic 248 (strip)	Sexton Blake On Special Service	Anon. (Clarke/Taylor)		
Knock-Out Comic 249 (strip)	Sexton Blake On Special Service	Anon. (Clarke/Taylor)		
Knock-Out Comic 250 (strip)	Sexton Blake On Special Service	Anon. (Clarke/Taylor)		
Knock-Out Comic 251 (strip)	Sexton Blake On Special Service	Anon. (Clarke/Taylor)		
Knock-Out Comic 252 (strip)	Sexton Blake On Special Service	Anon. (Clarke/Taylor)		
Knock-Out Fun Book 1943	Sexton Blake and the Stolen Pearl; Plus: Sexton Blake Catches a Spy	Anon. (Unknown/Taylor); Anon. (Unknown/Taylor)		
The Sexton Blake Library (3rd Series) 39	Pte. Carter's Crime ·John Creasey			
The Sexton Blake Library (3rd Series) 40	The Riddle of the Disguised Greek	Anthony Parsons		
The Sexton Blake Library (3rd Series) 41	The Army Defaulter's Secret	L. C. Douthwaite		
The Sexton Blake Library (3rd Series) 42	The Kidnapped Munition Worker	Gilbert Chester (H. H. C. Gibbons)		
The Sexton Blake Library (3rd Series) 43	The Mansion on the Moor	John Purley (Reginald G. Thomas)		
The Sexton Blake Library (3rd Series) 44	The Case of the Missing D.F.C.	Anthony Parsons		
The Sexton Blake Library (3rd Series) 45	The Case of the 'Suspect' Watchmaker	Lewis Jackson (Jack Lewis)		
The Sexton Blake Library (3rd Series) 46	The Devil of Danehurst	John Hunter		
The Sexton Blake Library (3rd Series) 47	The Terror of Tregarwith	John Sylvester (Hector Hawton)		
The Sexton Blake Library (3rd Series) 48	The Soldier Who Came Back	Gilbert Chester (H. H. C. Gibbons)		
The Sexton Blake Library (3rd Series) 49	The Affair of the Bronze Basilisk	Anthony Skene (George N. Philips)		
The Sexton Blake Library (3rd Series) 50	Doctor Sinister	Gilbert Chester (H. H. C. Gibbons)		
The Sexton Blake Library (3rd Series) 51	The Shipyard Menace	Joseph Stamper		
The Sexton Blake Library (3rd Series) 52	Calling — Whitehall 1212	Anthony Parsons		
The Sexton Blake Library (3rd Series) 53	The Mystery of Squadron X	Walter Tyrer		
The Sexton Blake Library (3rd Series) 54	The Affair of the Smuggled Millions; The Crime of the Empty Shrimper	M. B. Dix; Martin Frazer (Percy A. Clarke)		
The Sexton Blake Library (3rd Series) 55	The Crime of the Cashiered Major	Anthony Parsons		
The Sexton Blake Library (3rd Series) 56	The Secret of Stillwater Mere	Gilbert Chester (H. H. C. Gibbons)		
The Sexton Blake Library (3rd Series) 57	The Man From Madrid	Peter Meriton (John Hunter)		
The Sexton Blake Library (3rd Series) 58	The Riddle of Cubicle 7	Anthony Parsons		
The Sexton Blake Library (3rd Series) 59	The Monopoly Menace	John Hunter		
The Sexton Blake Library (3rd Series) 60	The Case of the Repatriated Prisoner	Gilbert Chester (H. H. C. Gibbons)		
The Sexton Blake Library (3rd Series) 61	The Curse of the Carringtons	Walter Tyrer		
The Sexton Blake Library (3rd Series) 62	The Case of the Secret Road	Anthony Parsons		

== 1944 ==
Publication	Title	Author	Key Characters	Notes
Knock-Out Comic 253 (strip)	Sexton Blake On Special Service	Anon. (Clarke/Taylor)		
Knock-Out Comic 254 (strip)	Sexton Blake On Special Service	Anon. (Clarke/Taylor)		
Knock-Out Comic 255 (strip)	Sexton Blake On Special Service	Anon. (Clarke/Taylor)		
Knock-Out Comic 256 (strip)	Sexton Blake On Special Service	Anon. (Clarke/Taylor)		
Knock-Out Comic 257 (strip)	Sexton Blake On Special Service	Anon. (Clarke/Taylor)		
Knock-Out Comic 258 (strip)	Sexton Blake On Special Service	Anon. (Clarke/Taylor)		
Knock-Out Comic 259 (strip)	Sexton Blake On Special Service	Anon. (Clarke/Taylor)		
Knock-Out Comic 260 (strip)	Sexton Blake On Special Service	Anon. (Clarke/Taylor)		
Knock-Out Comic 262 (strip)	Sexton Blake On Special Service	Anon. (Clarke/Taylor)		
Knock-Out Comic 262 (strip)	Sexton Blake On Special Service	Anon. (Clarke/Taylor)		
Knock-Out Comic 263 (strip)	Sexton Blake On Special Service	Anon. (Clarke/Taylor)		
Knock-Out Comic 264 (strip)	Sexton Blake On Special Service	Anon. (Clarke/Taylor)		
Knock-Out Comic 265 (strip)	Sexton Blake On Special Service	Anon. (Clarke/Taylor)		
Knock-Out Comic 266 (strip)	Sexton Blake On Special Service	Anon. (Clarke/Taylor)		
Knock-Out Comic 267 (strip)	Sexton Blake On Special Service	Anon. (Clarke/Taylor)		
Knock-Out Comic 268 (strip)	Sexton Blake On Special Service	Anon. (Clarke/Taylor)		
Knock-Out Comic 269 (strip)	Sexton Blake On Special Service	Anon. (Clarke/Taylor)		
Knock-Out Comic 270 (strip)	Sexton Blake On Special Service	Anon. (Clarke/Taylor)		
Knock-Out Comic 271 (strip)	Sexton Blake On Special Service	Anon. (Clarke/Taylor)		
Knock-Out Comic 272 (strip)	Sexton Blake On Special Service	Anon. (Clarke/Taylor)		
Knock-Out Comic 273 (strip)	Sexton Blake On Special Service	Anon. (Clarke/Taylor)		
Knock-Out Comic 274 (strip)	Sexton Blake On Special Service	Anon. (Clarke/Taylor)		
Knock-Out Comic 275 (strip)	Sexton Blake On Special Service	Anon. (Clarke/Taylor)		
Knock-Out Comic 276 (strip)	Sexton Blake On Special Service	Anon. (Clarke/Taylor)		
Knock-Out Comic 277 (strip)	Sexton Blake On Special Service	Anon. (Clarke/Taylor)		
Knock-Out Comic 278 (strip)	Sexton Blake On Special Service Anon. (Clarke/Taylor)			
Knock-Out Comic 279 (strip)	Sexton Blake On Special Service	Anon. (Clarke/Taylor)		
Knock-Out Comic 280 (strip)	Sexton Blake On Special Service	Anon. (Clarke/Taylor)		
Knock-Out Comic 281 (strip)	Sexton Blake On Special Service	Anon. (Clarke/Taylor)		
Knock-Out Comic 282 (strip)	Sexton Blake On Special Service	Anon. (Clarke/Taylor)		
Knock-Out Comic 283 (strip)	Sexton Blake and the Golden Lion (part 1)	Anon. (Clarke/Taylor)		
Knock-Out Comic 284 (strip)	Sexton Blake and the Golden Lion (part 2)	Anon. (Clarke/Taylor)		
Knock-Out Comic 285 (strip)	Sexton Blake and the Golden Lion (part 3)	Anon. (Clarke/Taylor)		
Knock-Out Comic 286 (strip)	Sexton Blake and the Golden Lion (part 4)	Anon. (Clarke/Taylor)		
Knock-Out Comic 287 (strip)	Sexton Blake and the Golden Lion (part 5)	Anon. (Clarke/Taylor)		
Knock-Out Comic 288 (strip)	Sexton Blake and the Golden Lion (part 6)	Anon. (Clarke/Taylor)		
Knock-Out Comic 289 (strip)	Sexton Blake and the Golden Lion (part 7)	Anon. (Clarke/Taylor)		
Knock-Out Comic 290 (strip)	Sexton Blake and the Golden Lion (part 8)	Anon. (Clarke/Taylor)		
Knock-Out Comic 291 (strip)	Sexton Blake and the Golden Lion (part 9)	Anon. (Clarke/Taylor)		
Knock-Out Comic 292 (strip)	Sexton Blake and the Golden Lion (part 10)	Anon. (Clarke/Taylor)		
Knock-Out Comic 293 (strip)	Sexton Blake and the Golden Lion (part 11)	Anon. (Clarke/Taylor)		
Knock-Out Comic 294 (strip)	Sexton Blake and the Golden Lion (part 12)	Anon. (Clarke/Taylor)		
Knock-Out Comic 295 (strip)	Sexton Blake and the Golden Lion (part 13)	Anon. (Clarke/Taylor)		
Knock-Out Comic 296 (strip)	Sexton Blake and the Golden Lion (part 14)	Anon. (Clarke/Taylor)		
Knock-Out Comic 297 (strip)	Sexton Blake and the Golden Lion (part 15)	Anon. (Clarke/Taylor)		
Knock-Out Comic 298 (strip)	Sexton Blake and the Golden Lion (part 16)	Anon. (Clarke/Taylor)		
Knock-Out Comic 299 (strip)	Sexton Blake and the Trail of the Missing Heir (part 1)	Anon. (Clarke/Taylor)		
Knock-Out Comic 300 (strip)	Sexton Blake and the Trail of the Missing Heir (part 2)	Anon. (Clarke/Taylor)		
Knock-Out Comic 301 (strip)	Sexton Blake and the Trail of the Missing Heir (part 3)	Anon. (Clarke/Taylor)		
Knock-Out Comic 302 (strip)	Sexton Blake and the Trail of the Missing Heir (part 4)	Anon. (Clarke/Taylor)		
Knock-Out Comic 303 (strip)	Sexton Blake and the Trail of the Missing Heir (part 5)	Anon. (Clarke/Taylor)		
Knock-Out Comic 304 (strip)	Sexton Blake and the Trail of the Missing Heir (part 6)	Anon. (Clarke/Taylor)		
Knock-Out Comic 305 (strip)	Sexton Blake and the Trail of the Missing Heir (part 7)	Anon. (Clarke/Taylor)		
Knock-Out Fun Book 1944	Sexton Blake on the Trail of the Toad	Anon. (Unknown/Unknown)		
The Sexton Blake Library (3rd Series) 63	The Man from the Far East	John Hunter		
The Sexton Blake Library (3rd Series) 64	The Riddle of the Kidnapped Pensioner	Gilbert Chester (H. H. C. Gibbons)		
The Sexton Blake Library (3rd Series) 65	The Case of the Biscay Pirate	Lewis Jackson (Jack Lewis)		
The Sexton Blake Library (3rd Series) 66	Previously Reported Missing – Now?	Gilbert Chester (H. H. C. Gibbons)		
The Sexton Blake Library (3rd Series) 67	The Mystery of the Cairo Express	Anthony Parsons		
The Sexton Blake Library (3rd Series) 68	The Riddle of the Italian Prisoner	John Hunter		
The Sexton Blake Library (3rd Series) 69	The Riddle of the Ruins	Lewis Jackson (Jack Lewis)		
The Sexton Blake Library (3rd Series) 70	The Mystery of the Demobilised Soldier	Gilbert Chester (H. H. C. Gibbons)		
The Sexton Blake Library (3rd Series) 71	The Essex Road Crime	John Drummond (J. N. Chance)		
The Sexton Blake Library (3rd Series) 72	The Case of the Renegade Naval Officer	Anthony Parsons		
The Sexton Blake Library (3rd Series) 73	Barred from the West End	John Hunter		
The Sexton Blake Library (3rd Series) 74	The Man Who Wouldn't Quit	Gilbert Chester (H. H. C. Gibbons)		
The Sexton Blake Library (3rd Series) 75	The Manor House Menace	John Drummond (J. N. Chance)		
The Sexton Blake Library (3rd Series) 76	The Case of the Indian Millionaire	Anthony Parsons		
The Sexton Blake Library (3rd Series) 77	The Case of the Five Fugitives	Lewis Jackson (Jack Lewis)		
The Sexton Blake Library (3rd Series) 78	The Man They Couldn't Buy	Gilbert Chester (H. H. C. Gibbons)		
The Sexton Blake Library (3rd Series) 79	The Mystery of the Bombed Monastery	Anthony Parsons		
The Sexton Blake Library (3rd Series) 80	The Tragic Case of the Stationmaster's Legacy	John Drummond (J. N. Chance)		
The Sexton Blake Library (3rd Series) 81	The Case of the Conscript Miner	Walter Tyrer		
The Sexton Blake Library (3rd Series) 82	The Riddle of the Leather Bottle	John Drummond (J. N. Chance)		
The Sexton Blake Library (3rd Series) 83	The Mystery of the Indian Relic	Anthony Parsons		
The Sexton Blake Library (3rd Series) 84	The Strange Case of the Footman's Crime	Gilbert Chester (H. H. C. Gibbons)		
The Sexton Blake Library (3rd Series) 85	The Case of Sergt. Bill Morden; Plus: The Ship With Two Masters	R. Standish (R. Goyne); Anon. (Unknown)		
The Sexton Blake Library (3rd Series) 86	The Painted Dagger	John Drummond (J. N. Chance)		

== 1945 ==
Publication	Title	Author	Key Characters	Notes
Knock-Out Comic 306 (strip)	Sexton Blake and the Trail of the Missing Heir (part 8)	Anon. (Clarke/Taylor)		
Knock-Out Comic 307 (strip)	Sexton Blake and the Trail of the Missing Heir (part 9)	Anon. (Clarke/Taylor)		
Knock-Out Comic 308 (strip)	Sexton Blake and the Trail of the Missing Heir (part 10)	Anon. (Clarke/Taylor)		
Knock-Out Comic 309 (strip)	Sexton Blake and the Trail of the Missing Heir (part 11)	Anon. (Clarke/Taylor)		
Knock-Out Comic 310 (strip)	Sexton Blake and the Trail of the Missing Heir (part 12)	Anon. (Clarke/Taylor)		
Knock-Out Comic 311 (strip)	Sexton Blake and the Trail of the Missing Heir (part 13)	Anon. (Clarke/Taylor)		
Knock-Out Comic 312 (strip)	Sexton Blake and the Trail of the Missing Heir (part 14)	Anon. (Clarke/Taylor)		
Knock-Out Comic 313 (strip)	Sexton Blake and the Trail of the Missing Heir (part 15)	Anon. (Clarke/Taylor)		
Knock-Out Comic 314 (strip)	Sexton Blake and the Trail of the Missing Heir (part 16)	Anon. (Clarke/Taylor)		
Knock-Out Comic 315 (strip)	Sexton Blake and the Stolen Submarine (part 1)	Anon. (Clarke/Taylor)		
Knock-Out Comic 316 (strip)	Sexton Blake and the Stolen Submarine (part 2)	Anon. (Clarke/Taylor)		
Knock-Out Comic 317 (strip)	Sexton Blake and the Stolen Submarine (part 3)	Anon. (Clarke/Taylor)		
Knock-Out Comic 318 (strip)	Sexton Blake and the Stolen Submarine (part 4)	Anon. (Clarke/Taylor)		
Knock-Out Comic 319 (strip)	Sexton Blake and the Stolen Submarine (part 5)	Anon. (Clarke/Taylor)		
Knock-Out Comic 320 (strip)	Sexton Blake and the Stolen Submarine (part 6)	Anon. (Clarke/Taylor)		
Knock-Out Comic 321 (strip)	Sexton Blake and the Stolen Submarine (part 7)	Anon. (Clarke/Taylor)		
Knock-Out Comic 322 (strip)	Sexton Blake and the Stolen Submarine (part 8)	Anon. (Clarke/Taylor)		
Knock-Out Comic 323 (strip)	Sexton Blake and the Stolen Submarine (part 9)	Anon. (Clarke/Taylor)		
Knock-Out Comic 324 (strip)	Sexton Blake and the Stolen Submarine (part 10)	Anon. (Clarke/Taylor)		
Knock-Out Comic 325 (strip)	Sexton Blake and the Stolen Submarine (part 11)	Anon. (Clarke/Taylor)		
Knock-Out Comic 326 (strip)	Sexton Blake and the Stolen Submarine (part 12)	Anon. (Clarke/Taylor)		
Knock-Out Comic 327 (strip)	Sexton Blake and the Stolen Submarine (part 13)	Anon. (Clarke/Taylor)		
Knock-Out Comic 328 (strip)	Sexton Blake and the Threat of Kwang Chu (part 1)	Anon. (Clarke/Taylor)		
Knock-Out Comic 329 (strip)	Sexton Blake and the Threat of Kwang Chu (part 2)	Anon. (Clarke/Taylor)		
Knock-Out Comic 330 (strip)	Sexton Blake and the Threat of Kwang Chu (part 3)	Anon. (Clarke/Taylor)		
Knock-Out Comic 331 (strip)	Sexton Blake and the Threat of Kwang Chu (part 4)	Anon. (Clarke/Taylor)		
Knock-Out Comic 332 (strip)	Sexton Blake and the Threat of Kwang Chu (part 5)	Anon. (Clarke/Taylor)		
Knock-Out Comic 333 (strip)	Sexton Blake and the Threat of Kwang Chu (part 6)	Anon. (Clarke/Taylor)		
Knock-Out Comic 334 (strip)	Sexton Blake and the Threat of Kwang Chu (part 7)	Anon. (Clarke/Taylor)		
Knock-Out Comic 335 (strip)	Sexton Blake and the Threat of Kwang Chu (part 8)	Anon. (Clarke/Taylor)		
Knock-Out Comic 336 (strip)	Sexton Blake and the Threat of Kwang Chu (part 9)	Anon. (Clarke/Taylor)		
Knock-Out Comic 337 (strip)	Sexton Blake and the Threat of Kwang Chu (part 10)	Anon. (Clarke/Taylor)		
Knock-Out Comic 338 (strip)	Sexton Blake and the Threat of Kwang Chu (part 11)	Anon. (Clarke/Taylor)		
Knock-Out Comic 339 (strip)	Sexton Blake and the Threat of Kwang Chu (part 12)	Anon. (Clarke/Taylor)		
Knock-Out Comic 340 (strip)	Sexton Blake and the Threat of Kwang Chu (part 13)	Anon. (Clarke/Taylor)		
Knock-Out Comic 341 (strip)	Sexton Blake and the Threat of Kwang Chu (part 14)	Anon. (Clarke/Taylor)		
Knock-Out Comic 342 (strip)	Sexton Blake and the Threat of Kwang Chu (part 15)	Anon. (Clarke/Taylor)		
Knock-Out Comic 343 (strip)	Sexton Blake and the Threat of Kwang Chu (part 16)	Anon. (Clarke/Taylor)		
Knock-Out Comic 344 (strip)	The Strange Affair of Dr X (part 1)	Anon. (Clarke/Taylor)		
Knock-Out Comic 345 (strip)	The Strange Affair of Dr X (part 2)	Anon. (Clarke/Taylor)		
Knock-Out Comic 346 (strip)	The Strange Affair of Dr X (part 3)	Anon. (Clarke/Taylor)		
Knock-Out Comic 347 (strip)	The Strange Affair of Dr X (part 4)	Anon. (Clarke/Taylor)		
Knock-Out Comic 348 (strip)	The Strange Affair of Dr X (part 5)	Anon. (Clarke/Taylor)		
Knock-Out Comic 349 (strip)	The Strange Affair of Dr X (part 6)	Anon. (Clarke/Taylor)		
Knock-Out Comic 350 (strip)	The Strange Affair of Dr X (part 7)	Anon. (Clarke/Taylor)		
Knock-Out Comic 351 (strip)	The Strange Affair of Dr X (part 8)	Anon. (Clarke/Taylor)		
Knock-Out Comic 352 (strip)	The Strange Affair of Dr X (part 9)	Anon. (Clarke/Taylor)		
Knock-Out Comic 353 (strip)	The Strange Affair of Dr X (part 10)	Anon. (Clarke/Taylor)		
Knock-Out Comic 354 (strip)	The Strange Affair of Dr X (part 11)	Anon. (Clarke/Taylor)		
Knock-Out Comic 355 (strip)	The Strange Affair of Dr X (part 12)	Anon. (Clarke/Taylor)		
Knock-Out Comic 356 (strip)	The Strange Affair of Dr X (part 13)	Anon. (Clarke/Taylor)		
Knock-Out Comic 357 (strip)	The Strange Affair of Dr X (part 14)	Anon. (Clarke/Taylor)		
Knock-Out Fun Book 1945	Sexton Blake and the Mystery of the Torn Chart	Anon. (Unknown/Taylor)		
The Sexton Blake Library (3rd Series) 87	The Loot of France	Anthony Parsons		
The Sexton Blake Library (3rd Series) 88	The Sword of Vengeance	Gilbert Chester (H. H. C. Gibbons)		
The Sexton Blake Library (3rd Series) 89	The Case of the Deserted War Bride	John Hunter		
The Sexton Blake Library (3rd Series) 90	The Riddle of the Gambling Den	Anthony Parsons		
The Sexton Blake Library (3rd Series) 91	The House on the Hill	John Drummond (J. N. Chance)		
The Sexton Blake Library (3rd Series) 92	Under Police Observation	Gilbert Chester (H. H. C. Gibbons)		
The Sexton Blake Library (3rd Series) 93	The Great Airport Racket Mystery	John Hunter		
The Sexton Blake Library (3rd Series) 94	At Sixty M.P.H.	John Drummond (J. N. Chance)		
The Sexton Blake Library (3rd Series) 95	The Tallyman's Fate	Lewis Jackson (Jack Lewis)		
The Sexton Blake Library (3rd Series) 96	The Case of the Stolen Evidence	Anthony Parsons		
The Sexton Blake Library (3rd Series) 97	The Man from Arnhem	Lewis Jackson (Jack Lewis)		
The Sexton Blake Library (3rd Series) 98	The Blackmailed Refugee	Anthony Parsons		
The Sexton Blake Library (3rd Series) 99	The House in the Wood	Gilbert Chester (H. H. C. Gibbons)		
The Sexton Blake Library (3rd Series) 100	The Riddle of the Mummy Case	John Drummond (J. N. Chance)		
The Sexton Blake Library (3rd Series) 101	The Trail of the Five Red Herrings	Lewis Jackson (Jack Lewis)		
The Sexton Blake Library (3rd Series) 102	Sergeant Gray's Crime	John Hunter		
The Sexton Blake Library (3rd Series) 103	The Monta Grandee Diamonds	Stanton Hope		
The Sexton Blake Library (3rd Series) 104	The Case of the Missing Wardress	George E. Rochester		
The Sexton Blake Library (3rd Series) 105	The Case of the Spanish Legatee	Anthony Parsons		
The Sexton Blake Library (3rd Series) 106	The Riddle of the Workman Squire	Lewis Jackson (Jack Lewis)		
The Sexton Blake Library (3rd Series) 107	The Mystery of the Red Chateau	John Hunter		
The Sexton Blake Library (3rd Series) 108	On Compassionate Leave	Lewis Jackson (Jack Lewis)		
The Sexton Blake Library (3rd Series) 109	The Secret of the Sands	Walter Tyrer		
The Sexton Blake Library (3rd Series) 110	The Mystery of the Confiscated Ship	Gilbert Chester (H. H. C. Gibbons)		

== Bibliography ==
- Hodder, Mark. "THE SEXTON BLAKE BIBLIOGRAPHY". BLAKIANA.
